= List of statutory instruments of the United Kingdom, 1997 =

This is a complete list of all 1,840 statutory instruments published in the United Kingdom in the year 1997.

== 1–100 ==
- Education (Recognised Bodies) Order 1997 (S.I. 1997/1)
- Bedfordshire and Hertfordshire Ambulance and Paramedic Service National Health Service Trust (Establishment) Amendment Order (S.I. 1997/2)
- A312 Trunk Road (The Parkway, Hounslow) Red Route (Temporary Prohibition of Traffic) Order 1997 (S.I. 1997/4)
- A4 Trunk Road (Great West Road, Hounslow) Red Route (Temporary Prohibition of Traffic) Order 1997 (S.I. 1997/5)
- A4 Trunk Road (Great West Road, Hounslow) Red Route (Temporary Prohibition of Traffic) (No. 2) Order 1997 (S.I. 1997/6)
- Plant Protection Products (Amendment) Regulations 1997 (S.I. 1997/7)
- Channel Tunnel Rail Link (Qualifying Authorities) Order 1997 (S.I. 1997/8)
- Channel Tunnel Rail Link (Nomination) Order 1997 (S.I. 1997/9)
- Town and Country Planning (Fees for Applications and Deemed Applications) (Scotland) Regulations 1997 (S.I. 1997/10)
- Control of Substances Hazardous to Health (Amendment) Regulations 1997 (S.I. 1997/11)
- Sheffield Development Corporation (Transfer of Property, Rights and Liabilities) Order 1997 (S.I. 1997/12)
- Sheffield Development Corporation (Planning Functions) Order 1997 (S.I. 1997/13)
- Rules of Procedure (Air Force) (Amendment No. 2) Rules 1997 (S.I. 1997/14)
- Police and Criminal Evidence Act 1984 (Application to the Armed Forces) Order 1997 (S.I. 1997/15)
- Criminal Justice and Public Order Act 1994 (Application to the Armed Forces) Order 1997 (S.I. 1997/16)
- Police and Criminal Evidence Act 1984 (Codes of Practice) (Armed Forces) Order 1997 (S.I. 1997/17)
- Rules of Procedure (Army) (Amendment No. 2) Rules 1997 (S.I. 1997/18)
- Merchant Shipping (Carriage of Cargoes) Regulations 1997 (S.I. 1997/19)
- A2 Trunk Road (Greenwich) Red Route (Clearway) Traffic Order 1997 (S.I. 1997/21)
- Water Undertakers (Extension of Byelaws) Order 1997 (S.I. 1997/22)
- Trading Schemes Act 1996 (Commencement) Order 1997 (S.I. 1997/29)
- Trading Schemes Regulations 1997 (S.I. 1997/30)
- Trading Schemes (Exclusion) Regulations 1997 (S.I. 1997/31)
- Financial Services Act 1986 (Restriction of Scope of Act and Meaning of Collective Investment Scheme) Order 1997 (S.I. 1997/32)
- Hill Livestock (Compensatory Allowances) (Amendment) Regulations 1997 (S.I. 1997/33)
- Osteopaths Act 1993 (Commencement No. 1 and Transitional Provision) Order 1997 (S.I. 1997/34)
- Magistrates' Courts (Remands in Custody) (Amendment) Order 1997 (S.I. 1997/35)
- Criminal Procedure and Investigations Act 1996 (Appointed Day No. 2) Order 1997 (S.I. 1997/36)
- Town and Country Planning (Fees for Applications and Deemed Applications) (Amendment) Regulations 1997 (S.I. 1997/37)
- Occupational Pension Schemes (Contracting-out) Transitional Regulations 1997 (S.I. 1997/38)
- Railway Heritage Scheme Order 1997 (S.I. 1997/39)
- Bethlem and Maudsley National Health Service Trust (Transfer of Trust Property) Order 1997 (S.I. 1997/40)
- Severn National Health Service Trust (Transfer of Trust Property) Order 1997 (S.I. 1997/41)
- Betting, Gaming and Lotteries Act 1963 (Variation of Fees) Order 1997 (S.I. 1997/42)
- Lotteries (Prizes and Expenses: Variation and Prescription of Percentage Limits) Order 1997 (S.I. 1997/43)
- Local Housing Authorities (Prescribed Principles for Allocation Schemes) (Wales) Regulations 1997 (S.I. 1997/45)
- Energy Conservation Act 1996 (Commencement No. 3 and Adaptations) Order 1997 (S.I. 1997/47)
- Value Added Tax (Registered Social Landlords) (No. 1) Order 1997 (S.I. 1997/50)
- Value Added Tax (Registered Social Landlords) (No. 2) Order 1997 (S.I. 1997/51)
- Greenwich Healthcare National Health Service Trust (Transfer Of Trust Property) Order 1997 (S.I. 1997/52)
- Oxleas Healthcare National Health Service Trust (Transfer Of Trust Property) Order 1997 (S.I. 1997/53)
- Education (Listed Bodies) Order 1997 (S.I. 1997/54)
- Road Traffic (Permitted Parking Area and Special Parking Area) (County of Buckinghamshire) (High Wycombe Town Centre) Order 1997 (S.I. 1997/56)
- Electronic Lodgement of Tax Returns Order 1997 (S.I. 1997/57)
- Motor Vehicles (Designation of Approved Marks) (Amendment) Regulations 1997 (S.I. 1997/58)
- Food Protection (Emergency Prohibitions) (Radioactivity in Sheep) Partial Revocation Order 1997 (S.I. 1997/62)
- Act of Adjournal (Criminal Procedure Rules Amendment) 1997 (S.I. 1997/63)
- Patents (Supplementary Protection Certificates) Rules 1997 (S.I. 1997/64)
- Income-related Benefits and Jobseeker's Allowance (Miscellaneous Amendments) Regulations 1997 (S.I. 1997/65)
- Housing Act 1996 (Commencement No. 6 and Savings) Order 1997 (S.I. 1997/66)
- Secure Tenancies (Notices) (Amendment) Regulations 1997 (S.I. 1997/71)
- Introductory Tenants (Review) Regulations 1997 (S.I. 1997/72)
- Secure Tenants of Local Housing Authorities (Right to Repair) (Amendment) Regulations 1996 S.I. 1997/73)
- Housing Act 1996 (Consequential Amendments) Order 1997 (S.I. 1997/74)
- Local Government Changes for England (Valuation and Community Charge Tribunals) Regulations 1997 (S.I. 1997/75)
- Betting, Gaming and Lotteries Act 1963 (Variation of Fees) (Scotland) Order 1997 (S.I. 1997/77)
- National Health Service Pension Scheme and Provision of Information and Administrative Expenses etc. (Amendment) Regulations 1997 (S.I. 1997/80)
- Motor Vehicles (Tests) (Amendment) Regulations 1997 (S.I. 1997/81)
- Goods Vehicles (Plating and Testing) (Amendment) Regulations 1997 (S.I. 1997/82)
- Road Vehicles (Prohibition) (Amendment) Regulations 1997 (S.I. 1997/83)
- Public Service Vehicles (Conditions of Fitness, Equipment, Use and Certification) (Amendment) Regulations 1997 (S.I. 1997/84)
- A12 Trunk Road (Redbridge) (No. 1) Red Route Traffic Order 1996 Experimental Variation Order 1997 (S.I. 1997/87)
- A312 Trunk Road (Hounslow) Red Route (Clearway) Traffic Order 1997 (S.I. 1997/88)
- Public Telecommunication System Designation (Videotron Southampton & Eastleigh Limited) Order 1997 (S.I. 1997/90)
- Cumbria College of Art and Design Further Education Corporation (Transfer to the Higher Education Sector) Order 1997 (S.I. 1997/91)
- Education (Fees and Awards) (Scotland) Regulations 1997 (S.I. 1997/93)
- A4 Trunk Road (Great West Road, Hounslow) Red Route (Prescribed Routes) Traffic Order 1997 (S.I. 1997/96)
- Motor Vehicles (Third Party Risks) (Amendment) Regulations 1997 (S.I. 1997/97)

== 101–200 ==
- Local Authorities (Goods and Services) (Public Bodies) Order 1997 (S.I. 1997/101)
- Yorkshire Dales Light Railway Order 1997 (S.I. 1997/102)
- Scottish Enterprise (Aggregate Amount Outstanding) Order 1997 (S.I. 1997/119)
- Non-Domestic Rate (Scotland) Order 1997 (S.I. 1997/120)
- A41 Trunk Road (Camden) Red Route (Bus Lanes) Experimental Traffic Order 1997 (S.I. 1997/123)
- Local Government Act 1988 (Security Work) (Exemption) (Wales) Order 1997 (S.I. 1997/124)
- Local Government Act 1988 (Competition) (Information Technology Services) (Wales) Regulations 1997 (S.I. 1997/125)
- Local Government Act 1988 (Competition) (Legal Services) (Wales) Regulations 1997 (S.I. 1997/126)
- Local Government Act 1988 (Competition) (Construction and Property Services) (Wales) Regulations 1997 (S.I. 1997/127)
- Local Government Act 1988 (Competition) (Supervision of Parking, Management of Vehicles and Security Work) (Wales) Regulations 1997 (S.I. 1997/128)
- Local Government Act 1988 (Competition) (Personnel Services) (Wales) Regulations 1997 (S.I. 1997/129)
- Local Government Act 1988 (Competition) (Financial Services) (Wales) Regulations 1997 (S.I. 1997/130)
- Code of Practice on Equal Pay (Appointed Day) Order 1997 (S.I. 1997/131)
- Finance Act 1996, Schedule 35, (Appointed Day) Order 1997 (S.I. 1997/133)
- Employment Act 1989 (Commencement No. 2) Order 1997 (S.I. 1997/134)
- Health and Safety (Young Persons) Regulations 1997 (S.I. 1997/135)
- Children (Scotland) Act 1995 (Commencement No. 2 and Transitional Provisions) (Amendment) Order 1997 (S.I. 1997/137)
- Local Government Reorganisation (Representation of the People) Regulations 1997 (S.I. 1997/138)
- A205 Trunk Road (Greenwich) Red Route Experimental Traffic Order 1997 (S.I. 1997/139)
- A205 Trunk Road (Greenwich) Red Route Experimental (Banned Turns) Traffic Order 1997 (S.I. 1997/140)
- Milford Port Health Authority (Amendment) Order 1997 (S.I. 1997/143)
- Diseases of Poultry (Amendment) Order 1997 (S.I. 1997/150)
- Dockyard Services (Rosyth) (Designation and Appointed Day) (Revocation) Order 1997 (S.I. 1997/151)
- Dockyard Services (Devonport) (Designation and Appointed Day) (Revocation) Order 1997 (S.I. 1997/152)
- A3 Trunk Road (Malden Way And Tolworth Rise, Kingston upon Thames) (Prescribed Routes) Order 1974 (Variation) Order 1997 (S.I. 1997/153)
- A3 Trunk Road (Roehampton Vale, Wandsworth) (Prescribed Routes) Order 1988 (Variation) Order 1997 (S.I. 1997/154)
- A12 Trunk Road (Colchester Road, Havering) (Prescribed Routes) Order 1997 (S.I. 1997/155)
- City of Gloucester (Electoral Changes) Order 1997 (S.I. 1997/157)
- International Carriage of Dangerous Goods by Road (Fees) (Amendment) Regulations 1997 (S.I. 1997/158)
- Local Government Changes for England (Transport Levying Bodies) Regulations 1997 (S.I. 1997/165)
- Organic Products (Amendment) Regulations 1997 (S.I. 1997/166)
- Broadcasting (Sign Language) Order 1997 (S.I. 1997/167)
- International Organisations (Miscellaneous Exemptions) Order 1997 (S.I. 1997/168)
- Courts Martial (Army) Rules 1997 (S.I. 1997/169)
- Courts Martial (Royal Navy) Rules 1997 (S.I. 1997/170)
- Courts Martial (Royal Air Force) Rules 1997 (S.I. 1997/171)
- Standing Civilian Courts Order 1997 (S.I. 1997/172)
- Criminal Justice Act 1967 (Application to Courts-Martial) (Evidence) Regulations 1997 (S.I. 1997/173)
- Scottish Dental Practice Board Regulations 1997 (S.I. 1997/174)
- Local Government Act 1988 (Competition) (England) Regulations 1997 (S.I. 1997/175)
- Local Government Act 1988 (Defined Activities) (Housing Management and Security Work) (Exemptions) (England) Order 1997 (S.I. 1997/176)
- Court Funds (Amendment) Rules 1997 (S.I. 1997/177)
- Land Registration Fees Order 1997 (S.I. 1997/178)
- Forest of Dean (Parishes and Electoral Changes) Order 1997 (S.I. 1997/179)
- Control of Pesticides (Amendment) Regulations 1997 (S.I. 1997/188)
- Plant Protection Products (Basic Conditions) Regulations 1997 (S.I. 1997/189)
- Leeds Teaching Hospitals Special Trustees (Transfer of Trust Property) Order 1997 (S.I. 1997/190)
- Motor Vehicles (EC Type Approval) (Amendment) Regulations 1997 (S.I. 1997/191)
- Assured Tenancies and Agricultural Occupancies (Forms) Regulations 1997 (S.I. 1997/194)
- Beef (Marketing Payment) (No. 2) (Amendment) Regulations 1997 (S.I. 1997/195)
- Wolverhampton Health Care National Health Service Trust (Transfer of Trust Property) Order 1997 (S.I. 1997/196)
- Local Government Act 1988 (Competition) (Scotland) Regulations 1997 (S.I. 1997/197)
- Local Government Act 1988 (Defined Activities) (Exemptions) (Scotland) Order 1997 (S.I. 1997/198)
- Housing Revenue Account General Fund Contribution Limits (Scotland) Order 1997 (S.I. 1997/199)
- A205 Trunk Road (Upper Richmond Road West) Red Route (Prescribed Route) Traffic Order 1997 (S.I. 1997/200)

== 201–300 ==
- A1 Trunk Road (Haringey) Red Route Traffic Order 1993 Variation Order 1997 (S.I. 1997/201)
- A1 Trunk Road (Islington) Red Route Traffic Order 1993 Variation No. 3 Order 1997 (S.I. 1997/202)
- City of Westminster (A41 Trunk Road) Red Route (Bus Lanes) Experimental Traffic Order 1997 (S.I. 1997/203)
- Local Authorities (Goods and Services) (Public Bodies) (Trunk Roads) (No. 1) Order 1997 (S.I. 1997/204)
- Act of Sedurant (Judicial Factors Rules) (Amendment) 1997 (S.I. 1997/206)
- General Teaching Council for Scotland (Amendment of Constitution) Order 1997 (S.I. 1997/207)
- A41 Trunk Road (Camden) Red Route Experimental (No. 2) Traffic Order 1997 (S.I. 1997/208)
- Western Isles Council (Brevig) Harbour Revision Order 1997 (S.I. 1997/209)
- Consumer Credit (Quotations) (Revocation) Regulations 1997 (S.I. 1997/211)
- Authorised Unit Trusts (Interest Distributions) (Qualifying Investments) Order 1997 (S.I. 1997/212)
- Unit Trust Schemes and Offshore Funds (Non-qualifying Investments Test) Order 1997 (S.I. 1997/213)
- Income Tax (Employments) (Amendment) Regulations 1997 (S.I. 1997/214)
- Local Government Changes for England (Council Tax) (Transitional Reduction) Regulations 1997 (S.I. 1997/215)
- Pensions Act 1995 (Commencement No. 9) Order1997 (S.I. 1997/216)
- Water Supply Byelaws (Scotland) Extension of Period Order 1997 (S.I. 1997/217)
- Local Government Pension Scheme (London Boroughs Children's Regional Planning Committee) Regulations 1997 (S.I. 1997/218)
- Passenger and Goods Vehicles (Recording Equipment) (Approval of Fitters and Workshops) (Fees) (Amendment) Regulations 1997 (S.I. 1997/219)
- Companies Act 1985 (Accounts of Small and Medium-sized Companies and Minor Accounting Amendments) Regulations 1997 (S.I. 1997/220)
- Common Lodging Houses (Repeal) Consequential Provisions Order 1997 (S.I. 1997/221)
- Gas Act 1995 (Rateable Values) (Modification) Order 1997 (S.I. 1997/224)
- Housing Act 1996 (Commencement No. 7 and Savings) Order 1997 (S.I. 1997/225)
- Wildlife and Countryside Act 1981 (Variation of Schedule 9) Order 1997 (S.I. 1997/226)
- Housing (Enforcement Procedures for Houses in Multiple Occupation) Order 1997 (S.I. 1997/227)
- Housing (Recovery of Expenses for Section 352 Notices) Order 1997 (S.I. 1997/228)
- Housing in Multiple Occupation (Fees for Registration Schemes) Order 1997 (S.I. 1997/229)
- Housing (Fire Safety in Houses in Multiple Occupation) Order 1997 (S.I. 1997/230)
- Royal Air Force Terms of Service (Amendment) Regulations 1997 (S.I. 1997/231)
- Local Authorities (Alteration of Requisite Calculations) Regulations 1997 (S.I. 1997/232)
- County Council of the Royal County of Berkshire (River Kennet, Fobney Bridge Reading) Scheme 1996 Confirmation Instrument 1997 (S.I. 1997/233)
- Public Telecommunication System Designation (Telewest Communications (Southport) Limited) Order 1997 (S.I. 1997/234)
- Public Telecommunication System Designation (Lichfield Cable Communications Limited) Order 1997 (S.I. 1997/235)
- Superannuation (Admission to Schedule 1 to the Superannuation Act 1972) Order 1997 (S.I. 1997/236)
- Food Protection (Emergency Prohibitions) (Oil and Chemical Pollution of Fish and Plants) (Partial Revocation) Order 1997 (S.I. 1997/239)
- Electricity (Non-Fossil Fuel Sources) (England and Wales) Order 1997 (S.I. 1997/248)
- Suckler Cow Premium (Amendment) Regulations 1997 (S.I. 1997/249)
- Dairy Produce Quotas (Amendment) Regulations 1997 (S.I. 1997/250)
- Special Waste (Amendment) Regulations 1997 (S.I. 1997/251)
- Occupational Pension Schemes (Independent Trustee) Regulations 1997 (S.I. 1997/252)
- Passenger Transport Executives (Capital Finance) (Amendment) Order 1997 (S.I. 1997/253)
- Superannuation (Admission to Schedule 1 to the Superannuation Act 1972) (No. 2) Order 1997 (S.I. 1997/254)
- Value Added Tax Tribunals (Amendment) Rules 1997 (S.I. 1997/255)
- Motor Vehicles (Driving Licences) (Amendment) Regulations 1997 (S.I. 1997/256)
- Special Waste (Scotland) Regulations 1997 (S.I. 1997/257)
- A205 Trunk Road (Lewisham) Red Route Experimental Traffic Order 1997 (S.I. 1997/258)
- Local Government Reorganisation (Wales) (Council Tax Reduction Scheme) Regulations 1997 (S.I. 1997/261)
- Residuary Body for Wales (9 Swansea Road Llanelli) Order 1997 (S.I. 1997/262)
- Goods Vehicles (Plating and Testing) (Amendment) (No. 2) Regulations 1997 (S.I. 1997/263)
- London Underground (East London Line Extension) Order 1997 (S.I. 1997/264)
- Life Assurance and Other Policies (Keeping of Information and Duties of Insurers) Regulations 1997 (S.I. 1997/265)
- Potato Industry Development Council Order 1997 (S.I. 1997/266)
- Road Traffic (New Drivers) Act 1995 (Commencement) Order 1997 (S.I. 1997/267)
- Continental Shelf (Designation of Areas) Order 1997 (S.I. 1997/268)
- European Communities (Definition of Treaties) (Europe Agreement establishing an Association between the European Communities and their Member States and the Republic of Estonia) Order 1997 (S.I. 1997/269)
- European Communities (Definition of Treaties) (Europe Agreement establishing an Association between the European Communities and their Member States and the Republic of Latvia) Order 1997 (S.I. 1997/270)
- European Communities (Definition of Treaties) (Europe Agreement establishing an Association between the European Communities and their Member States and the Republic of Lithuania) Order 1997 (S.I. 1997/271)
- United Nations Arms Embargoes (Dependent Territories) (Amendment) Order 1997 (S.I. 1997/272)
- United Nations Arms Embargoes (Rwanda) (Amendment) Order 1997 (S.I. 1997/273)
- Construction Contracts (Northern Ireland) Order 1997 (S.I. 1997/274)
- Immigration (Isle of Man) Order 1997 (S.I. 1997/275)
- Road Traffic Regulation (Northern Ireland) Order 1997 (S.I. 1997/276)
- Theft (Amendment) (Northern Ireland) Order 1997 (S.I. 1997/277)
- Territorial Sea Act 1987 (Jersey) Order 1997 (S.I. 1997/278)
- United Nations Arms Embargoes (Somalia, Liberia and Rwanda) (Channel Islands) (Amendment) Order 1997 (S.I. 1997/279)
- United Nations Arms Embargoes (Somalia, Liberia and Rwanda) (Isle of Man) (Amendment) Order 1997 (S.I. 1997/280)
- United Nations (International Tribunals) (Former Yugoslavia and Rwanda) (Guernsey) Order 1997 (S.I. 1997/281)
- United Nations (International Tribunals) (Former Yugoslavia and Rwanda) (Isle of Man) Order 1997 (S.I. 1997/282)
- United Nations (International Tribunals) (Former Yugoslavia and Rwanda) (Jersey) Order 1997 (S.I. 1997/283)
- Wireless Telegraphy (Channel Islands) (Amendment) Order 1997 (S.I. 1997/284)
- Wireless Telegraphy (Isle of Man) (Amendment) Order 1997 (S.I. 1997/285)
- Naval, Military and Air Forces Etc. (Disablement and Death) Service Pensions Amendment Order 1997 (S.I. 1997/286)
- Air Navigation (Second Amendment) Order 1997 (S.I. 1997/287)
- Education (Chief Inspector of Schools in Wales) Order 1997 (S.I. 1997/288)
- Wireless Telegraphy (Television Licence Fees) Regulations 1997 (S.I. 1997/290)
- Act of Sederunt (Child Care and Maintenance Rules) 1997 (S.I. 1997/291)
- Sheffield Development Corporation (Area and Constitution) Order 1997 (S.I. 1997/292)
- Education (Transfer of Functions Relating to Grant-maintained Schools) Order 1997 (S.I. 1997/294)

== 301–400 ==
- Civil Jurisdiction and Judgements Act 1982 (Interim Relief) Order 1997 (S.I. 1997/302)
- Armed Forces Act 1996 (Commencement No. 2) Order 1997 (S.I. 1997/304)
- Reserve Forces Act 1996 (Commencement No. 1) Order 1997 (S.I. 1997/305)
- Reserve Forces Act 1996 (Transitional, Consequential and Saving Provisions) Regulations 1997 (S.I. 1997/306)
- Reserve Forces (Call-out and Recall) (Exemptions Etc.) Regulations 1997 (S.I. 1997/307)
- Reserve Forces (Provision of Information by Persons Liable to be Recalled) Regulations 1997 (S.I. 1997/308)
- Reserve Forces (Call-out and Recall) (Financial Assistance) Regulations 1997 (S.I. 1997/309)
- Importation of Bees Order 1997 (S.I. 1997/310)
- Teachers (Compensation for Redundancy and Premature Retirement) Regulations 1997 (S.I. 1997/311)
- Teachers' Superannuation (Amendment) Regulations 1997 (S.I. 1997/312)
- Public Telecommunication System Designation (Birmingham Cable Limited) Order 1997 (S.I. 1997/313)
- Public Telecommunications System Designation (HSCo Limited) Order 1997 (S.I. 1997/314)
- Public Telecommunication System Designation (Telewest Communications Fylde and Wyre Limited) Order 1997 (S.I. 1997/315)
- Independent Qualified Conveyancers (Scotland) Regulations 1997 (S.I. 1997/316)
- Executry Practitioners (Scotland) Regulations 1997 (S.I. 1997/317)
- Local Government (Consequential Provisions) (Scotland) Order 1997 (S.I. 1997/318)
- Local Authorities (Capital Finance) Regulations 1997 (S.I. 1997/319)
- Hovercraft (Fees) Regulations 1997 (S.I. 1997/320)
- Registration of Homeopathic Veterinary Medicinal Products (Fees) Regulations 1997 (S.I. 1997/321)
- Registration of Homoeopathic Veterinary Medicinal Products Regulations 1997 (S.I. 1997/322)
- Export of Goods (Control) (Amendment) Order 1997 (S.I. 1997/323)
- Dual-Use and Related Goods (Export Control) (Amendment) Regulations 1997 (S.I. 1997/324)
- Llanelli Harbour Revision Order 1997 (S.I. 1997/325)
- Health Promotion Authority for Wales Constitution (Amendment) Order 1997 (S.I. 1997/326)
- Health Promotion Authority for Wales Regulations 1997 (S.I. 1997/327)
- Housing (Change of Landlord) (Payment of Disposal Cost by Instalments) (Amendment) Regulations 1997 (S.I. 1997/328)
- Local Government Pension Scheme (Internal Dispute Resolution Procedure) Regulations 1997 (S.I. 1997/329)
- Countryside Premium Scheme (Scotland) Regulations 1997 (S.I. 1997/330)
- New Town (Cumbernauld) (Transfer of Property, Rights and Liabilities) Order 1997 (S.I. 1997/341)
- New Town (Livingston) (Transfer of Property, Rights and Liabilities) Order 1997 (S.I. 1997/342)
- New Town (Irvine) (Transfer of Property, Rights and Liabilities) Order 1997 (S.I. 1997/343)
- Merchant Shipping (Disqualification of Holder of Seaman's Certificates) Regulations 1997 (S.I. 1997/346)
- Merchant Shipping (Section 63 Inquiries) Rules 1997 (S.I. 1997/347)
- "Merchant Shipping (Training and Certification) Regulation 1997 (S.I. 1997/348 (See also S.I. 1997/1911))". opsi.gov.uk.
- Social Security (Disability Living Allowance) Amendment Regulations 1997 (S.I. 1997/349)
- Housing Act 1996 (Commencement No. 8) Order 1997 (S.I. 1997/350)
- Waste Management (Miscellaneous Provisions) Regulations 1997 (S.I. 1997/351)
- A205 Trunk Road (Westhorne Avenue, Greenwich) (Temporary Prohibition of Traffic) Order 1997 (S.I. 1997/353)
- University Hospital Birmingham National Health Service Trust (Transfer of Trust Property) Order 1997 (S.I. 1997/354)
- Kent and Canterbury Hospitals National Health Service Trust (Transfers of Trust Property) Order 1997 (S.I. 1997/355)
- Non-Domestic Rating (Demand Notices) (Wales) (Amendment) Regulations 1997 (S.I. 1997/356)
- Council Tax (Demand Notices) (Wales) (Transitional Provisions) Regulations 1997 (S.I. 1997/357)
- Occupational and Personal Pension Schemes (Contracting-out etc.: Review of Determinations) Regulations 1997 (S.I. 1997/358)
- Civil Courts (Amendment) Order 1997 (S.I. 1997/361)
- Water Services Charges (Billing and Collection) (Scotland) Order 1997 (S.I. 1997/362)
- Domestic Sewerage Charges (Reduction) (Scotland) Regulations 1997 (S.I. 1997/363)
- Scottish Qualifications Authority (Transfer Date) (Scotland) Order 1997 (S.I. 1997/364)
- Education (Scotland) Act 1996 (Commencement No. 2) Order 1997 (S.I. 1997/365)
- Town and Country Planning (General Permitted Development) (Amendment) Order 1997 (S.I. 1997/366)
- Jobseeker's Allowance (Amendment) Regulations 1997 (S.I. 1997/367)
- Education (Teachers) (Amendment) Regulations 1997 (S.I. 1997/368)
- Income Tax (Charge to Tax) (Payments out of Surplus Funds) (Relevant Rate) Order 1997 (S.I. 1997/369)
- Register of Occupational and Personal Pension Schemes 1997 (S.I. 1997/371)
- Secure Tenancies (Notices) (Amendment No. 2) Regulations 1997 (S.I. 1997/377)
- Act of Sedurant (Lands Valuation Appeal Court) 1997 (S.I. 1997/378)
- Act of Sedurant (Registration Appeal Court) 1997 (S.I. 1997/379)
- Local Authorities (Capital Finance) (Rate of Discount for 1997/98) Regulations 1997 (S.I. 1997/381)
- Plant Breeders' Rights (Fees) (Amendment) Regulations 1997 (S.I. 1997/382)
- Seeds (National Lists of Varieties) (Fees) (Amendment) Regulations 1997 (S.I. 1997/383)
- Road Traffic Offenders (Additional Offences and Prescribed Devices) Order 1997 (S.I. 1997/384)
- Bovine Products (Production and Despatch) Regulations 1997 (S.I. 1997/389)
- Education (Grants for Education Support and Training) (Wales) Regulations 1997 (S.I. 1997/390)
- Self-Governing Schools etc. (Scotland) Act 1989 (Commencement No. 3) Order 1997 (S.I. 1997/391)
- Council Tax (Administration and Enforcement) (Amendment) Regulations 1997 (S.I. 1997/393)
- Council Tax and Non-Domestic Rating (Demand Notices) (England) (Amendment) Regulations 1997 (S.I. 1997/394)
- North and Mid Hampshire Health Authority (Transfers of Trust Property) Order 1997 (S.I. 1997/395)
- Public Record Office (Fees) Regulations 1997 (S.I. 1997/400)

== 401–500 ==
- Road Vehicles (Registration and Licensing) (Amendment) Regulations 1997 (S.I. 1997/401)
- Criminal Appeal Act 1995 (Commencement No. 4 and Transitional Provisions) Order 1997 (S.I. 1997/402)
- Economic Regulation of Airports (Expenses of the Monopolies and Mergers Commission) Regulations 1997 (S.I. 1997/403)
- Black Country Mental Health National Health Service Trust (Transfer of Trust Property) Order 1997 (S.I. 1997/404)
- Lloyd's Underwriters (Double Taxation Relief) Regulations 1997 (S.I. 1997/405)
- Local Government Act 1988 (Defined Activities (Exemption) (Tonbridge and Malling Borough Council) Order 1997 (S.I. 1997/406)
- Industrial Training Levy (Construction Board) Order 1997 (S.I. 1997/407)
- Industrial Training Levy (Engineering Construction Board) Order 1997 (S.I. 1997/408)
- Public Telecommunication System Designation (Telewest Communications plc) Order 1997 (S.I. 1997/409)
- Rules of the Supreme Court (Amendment) 1997 (S.I. 1997/415)
- Civil Legal Aid (General) (Amendment) Regulations 1997 (S.I. 1997/416)
- Weald of Kent Community National Health Service Trust Dissolution Order 1997 (S.I. 1997/417)
- Maidstone Priority Care National Health Service Trust Dissolution Order 1997 (S.I. 1997/418)
- Invicta Community Care National Health Service Trust (Establishment) Order 1997 (S.I. 1997/419)
- Town and Country Planning (Determination of Appeals by Appointed Persons) (Prescribed Classes) Regulations 1997 (S.I. 1997/420)
- South East Water Limited (Extension of Byelaws) Order 1997 (S.I. 1997/421)
- Education (Mandatory Awards) Regulations 1997 (S.I. 1997/431)
- London Borough of Islington (Trunk Roads) Red Route (Bus Lanes) Traffic Order 1997 (S.I. 1997/445)
- City of Westminster (Trunk Roads) Red Route (Bus Lanes) Traffic Order 1997 (S.I. 1997/446)
- Northampton Community Healthcare National Health Service Trust (Transfer of Trust Property) Order 1997 (S.I. 1997/447)
- Princess Alexandra Hospital National Health Service Trust (Transfer of Trust Property) Order 1997 (S.I. 1997/448)
- London Borough of Haringey (Trunk Roads) Red Route (Bus Lanes) Traffic Order 1997 (S.I. 1997/449)
- London Borough of Enfield (Trunk Roads) Red Route (Bus Lanes) Traffic Order 1997 (S.I. 1997/450)
- Infant Formula and Follow-on Formula (Amendment) Regulations 1997 (S.I. 1997/451)
- Non-Domestic Rates (Levying) (Scotland) Regulations 1997 (S.I. 1997/452)
- Birmingham Heartlands and Solihull (Teaching) National Health Service Trust (Transfer of Trust Property) Order 1997 (S.I. 1997/453)
- Social Security (Miscellaneous Amendments) Regulations 1997 (S.I. 1997/454)
- Local Government Act 1988 (Defined Activities) (Exemption) (Lichfield District Council) Order 1997 (S.I. 1997/455)
- Wiltshire County Council (Borough of Thamesdown) (Staff Transfer) Order 1997 (S.I. 1997/456)
- Guaranteed Minimum Pensions Increase Order 1997 (S.I. 1997/457)
- Dorset County Council (Boroughs of Poole and Bournemouth) (Staff Transfer) Order 1997 (S.I. 1997/458)
- Derbyshire County Council (City of Derby) (Staff Transfer) Order 1997 (S.I. 1997/459)
- Durham County Council (Borough of Darlington) (Staff Transfer) Order 1997 (S.I. 1997/460)
- East Sussex County Council (Boroughs of Brighton and Hove) (Staff Transfer) Order 1997 (S.I. 1997/461)
- London Borough of Camden (Trunk Roads) Red Route (Bus Lanes) Traffic Order 1997 (S.I. 1997/463)
- A10 Trunk Road (Haringey) Red Route Traffic Order 1997 (S.I. 1997/464)
- A13 Trunk Road (Newham) Red Route Traffic Order 1997 (S.I. 1997/465)
- A13 Trunk Road (Tower Hamlets) Red Route Traffic Order 1997 (S.I. 1997/466)
- A41 Trunk Road (Barnet) Red Route Traffic Order 1997 (S.I. 1997/467)
- Hampshire County Council (Cities of Portsmouth and Southampton) (Staff Transfer) Order 1997 (S.I. 1997/468)
- Staffordshire County Council (City of Stoke-on-Trent) (Staff Transfer) Order 1997 (S.I. 1997/469)
- Personal Pension Schemes (Appropriate Schemes) Regulations 1997 (S.I. 1997/470)
- Friendly Societies (Modification of the Corporation Tax Acts) (Amendment) Regulations 1997 (S.I. 1997/471)
- Friendly Societies (Taxation of Transfers of Business) (Amendment) Regulations 1997 (S.I. 1997/472)
- Friendly Societies (Modification of the Corporation Tax Acts) Regulations 1997 (S.I. 1997/473)
- Friendly Societies (Provisional Repayments for Exempt Business) (Amendment) Regulations 1997 (S.I. 1997/474)
- Friendly Societies (Gilt-edged Securities) (Periodic Accounting for Tax on Interest) (Amendment) Regulations 1997 (S.I. 1997/475)
- Leicestershire County Council (City of Leicester and District of Rutland) (Staff Transfer) Order 1997 (S.I. 1997/476)
- Injuries in War (Shore Employments) Compensation (Amendment) Scheme 1997 (S.I. 1997/477)
- Bedfordshire County Council (Borough of Luton) (Staff Transfer) Order 1997 (S.I. 1997/478)
- Buckinghamshire County Council (Borough of Milton Keynes) (Staff Transfer) Order 1997 (S.I. 1997/479)
- Personal Pension Schemes (Transfer Payments) (Amendment) Regulations 1997 (S.I. 1997/480)
- Insurance Companies (Overseas Life Assurance Business) (Compliance) (Amendment) Regulations 1997 (S.I. 1997/481)
- Charities (Iveagh Bequest, Kenwood) Order 1997 (S.I. 1997/482)
- Allocation of Housing (Procedure) Regulations 1997 (S.I. 1997/483)
- Sugar Beet (Research and Education) Order 1997 (S.I. 1997/484)
- National Assistance (Assessment of Resources) (Amendment) Regulations 1997 (S.I. 1997/485)
- National Assistance (Sums for Personal Requirements) Regulations 1997 (S.I. 1997/486)
- Level Crossings Regulations 1997 (S.I. 1997/487)
- East Sussex (Coroners) Order 1997 (S.I. 1997/488)
- Hampshire (Coroners) Order 1997 (S.I. 1997/489)
- Leicestershire (Coroners) Order 1997 (S.I. 1997/490)
- BBC Home Service Transfer Scheme (Capital Allowances) Order 1997 (S.I. 1997/491)
- Staffordshire (Coroners) Order 1997 (S.I. 1997/492)
- Wiltshire (Coroners) Order 1997 (S.I. 1997/493)
- Bedfordshire (Coroners) Order 1997 (S.I. 1997/494)
- Buckinghamshire (Coroners) Order 1997 (S.I. 1997/495)
- Derbyshire (Coroners) Order 1997 (S.I. 1997/496)
- Dorset (Coroners) Order 1997 (S.I. 1997/497)
- Durham (Coroners) Order 1997 (S.I. 1997/498)

== 501–600 ==
- Professions Supplementary to Medicine (Prosthetists and Orthotists Board) Order of Council 1997 (S.I. 1997/504)
- Merchant Shipping (Prevention of Pollution) (Limits) Regulations 1997 (S.I. 1997/506)
- Value Added Tax (Finance) Order 1997 (S.I. 1997/510)
- Personal Equity Plan (Amendment) Regulations 1997 (S.I. 1997/511)
- Registration of Births, Still-births, Deaths and Marriages (Prescription of Forms) (Scotland) Amendment Regulations 1997 (S.I. 1997/512)
- South Park Sixth Form College, Middlesbrough (Dissolution) Order 1997 (S.I. 1997/513)
- Education (Grants for Education Support and Training) (England) Regulations 1997 (S.I. 1997/514)
- Education (Funding for Teacher Training) Designation Order 1997 (S.I. 1997/515)
- National Health Service (Existing Liabilities Scheme) (Amendment) Regulations 1997 (S.I. 1997/526)
- National Health Service (Clinical Negligence Scheme) (Amendment) Regulations 1997 (S.I. 1997/527)
- Local Government Act 1988 (Direct Service Organisations) (Accounts etc.) (Extension) (Wales) Order 1997 (S.I. 1997/528)
- Merchant Shipping (Minimum Standards of Safety Communications) Regulations 1997 (S.I. 1997/529)
- Road Vehicles (Construction and Use) (Amendment) Regulations 1997 (S.I. 1997/530)
- Town and Country Planning (Development Plan) (Amendment) Regulations 1997 (S.I. 1997/531)
- Local Government Act 1988 (Defined Activities) (Exemptions) (London Boroughs of Newham and Southwark) Order 1997 (S.I. 1997/532)
- Local Government Act 1988 (Defined Activities) (Exemptions) (London Borough of Brent) Order 1997 (S.I. 1997/533)
- Customs Reviews and Appeals (Tariff and Origin) Regulations 1997 (S.I. 1997/534)
- Section 19 Minibus (Designated Bodies) (Amendment) Order 1997 (S.I. 1997/535)
- Disability Discrimination (Abolition of District Advisory Committees) Order 1997 (S.I. 1997/536)
- Returning Officers (Parliamentary Constituencies) (England) (Amendment) Order 1997 (S.I. 1997/537)
- Residuary Body for Wales (Dyffryn House and Gardens) Order 1997 (S.I. 1997/540)
- Lancashire County Council (Westgate Link Road, Burnley) (The New Barracks Canal Bridge) Scheme 1996 Confirmation Instrument 1997 (S.I. 1997/541)
- Common Agricultural Policy (Wine) (Amendment) Regulations 1997 (S.I. 1997/542)
- Social Security Benefits Up-rating Order 1997 (S.I. 1997/543)
- Social Security (Contributions) (Re-rating and National Insurance Fund Payments) Order 1997 (S.I. 1997/544)
- Social Security (Contributions) Amendment Regulations 1997 (S.I. 1997/545)
- Social Security (Incapacity for Work) (General) Amendment Regulations 1997 (S.I. 1997/546)
- Control of Pollution (Silage, Slurry and Agricultural Fuel Oil) (Amendment) Regulations 1997 (S.I. 1997/547)
- A30 Trunk Road (Hounslow and Hillingdon) Red Route (Clearway) Traffic Order 1996 Variation Order 1997 (S.I. 1997/548)
- A316 Trunk Road (Hounslow) Red Route (Clearway) Traffic Order 1995 Variation Order 1997 (S.I. 1997/549)
- A4 Trunk Road (Hounslow) Red Route (Clearway) Traffic Order 1996 Experimental Variation Order 1997 (S.I. 1997/550)
- Railway Safety (Miscellaneous Provisions) Regulations 1997 (S.I. 1997/553)
- A41 Trunk Road (Barnet) Red Route (Clearway) (No. 2) Traffic Order 1996 Variation Order 1997 (S.I. 1997/554)
- A205 Trunk Road (Lewisham) Red Route (Bus Lanes) Experimental Traffic Order 1997 (S.I. 1997/555)
- National Health Service (Dental Charges) Amendment Regulations 1997 (S.I. 1997/558)
- National Health Service (Charges for Drugs and Appliances) Amendment Regulations 1997 (S.I. 1997/559)
- Local Government Act 1988 (Defined Activities) (Exemptions) (England) Order 1997 (S.I. 1997/560)
- Local Government (Direct Labour Organisations) and Local Government Act 1988 (Competition) (Miscellaneous Amendment) (England) Regulations 1997 (S.I. 1997/561)
- Merchant Shipping (Light Dues) Regulations 1997 (S.I. 1997/562)
- Social Security (Jobseeker's Allowance and Mariners' Benefits) (Miscellaneous Amendments) Regulations 1997 (S.I. 1997/563)
- Motor Vehicles (Type Approval and Approval Marks) (Fees) Regulations 1997 (S.I. 1997/564)
- Vehicle Excise Duty (Immobilisation, Removal and Disposal of Vehicles) (Amendment) Regulations 1997 (S.I. 1997/565)
- National Police Records (Recordable Offences) (Amendment) Regulations 1997 S.I. 1997/566)
- Pesticides (Maximum Residue Levels in Crops, Food and Feeding Stuffs) (Amendment) Regulations 1997 (S.I. 1997/567)
- Rural Development Grants (Agriculture) (Wales) (Amendment) Regulations 1997 (S.I. 1997/568)
- Housing (Rights to Acquire) (Discount) (Wales) Order 1997 (S.I. 1997/569)
- Company Accounts (Disclosure of Directors' Emoluments) Regulations 1997 (S.I. 1997/570)
- Companies Act (Directors' Report) (Statement of Payment Practice Regulations 1997 (S.I. 1997/571)
- Education (Individual Pupils' Achievements) (Information) (Wales) Regulations 1997 (S.I. 1997/573)
- Statutory Maternity Pay (Compensation of Employers) Amendment Regulations 1997 (S.I. 1997/574)
- Social Security (Contributions) Amendment (No. 2) Regulations 1997 (S.I. 1997/575)
- Social Security Benefits Up-rating Regulations 1997 (S.I. 1997/576)
- Social Security (Industrial Injuries) (Dependency) (Permitted Earnings Limits) Order 1997 (S.I. 1997/577)
- Local Government Pension Scheme (Amendment) Regulations 1997 (S.I. 1997/578)
- Courts-Martial and Standing Civilian Courts (Army and Royal Air Force) (Additional Powers on Trial of Civilians) Regulations 1997 (S.I. 1997/579)
- Courts Martial Appeal (Amendment) Rules 1997 (S.I. 1997/580)
- Pontefract Hospitals National Health Service Trust Dissolution Order 1997 (S.I. 1997/581)
- Pinderfields and Pontefract Hospitals National Health Service Trust (Establishment) Order 1997 (S.I. 1997/582)
- Pinderfields Hospitals National Health Service Trust Dissolution Order 1997 (S.I. 1997/583)
- Housing Benefit (General) Amendment Regulations 1997 (S.I. 1997/584)
- National Health Service (Dental Charges) (Scotland) Amendment Regulations 1997 (S.I. 1997/585)
- Council Tax (Discounts) (Scotland) Amendment Order 1997 (S.I. 1997/586)
- Council Tax (Discounts) (Scotland) Amendment Regulations 1997 (S.I. 1997/587)
- Local Authorities (Members' Allowances) (Amendment) Regulations 1997 (S.I. 1997/589)
- A43 Trunk Road (Stamford Road, Weldon and Detrunking) Order 1997 (S.I. 1997/590)
- A21 Trunk Road (Vauxhall Junction Slip Roads) (Trunking ) Order 1997 (S.I. 1997/591)
- Housing Act 1996 (Commencement No. 9) Order 1997 (S.I. 1997/596)
- Education (Areas to which Pupils and Students Belong) (Amendment) Regulations 1997 (S.I. 1997/597)
- Local Government Pension Scheme (Transfers from the National Health Service Pension Scheme for England and Wales) Regulations 1997 (S.I. 1997/598)
- Education (Grant-maintained and Grant-maintained Special Schools) (Finance) (Wales) Regulations 1997 (S.I. 1997/599)

== 601–700 ==
- Seeds (Miscellaneous Amendments) Regulations 1997 (S.I. 1997/616)
- Specified Bovine Material Order 1997 (S.I. 1997/617)
- Housing Act 1996 (Commencement No. 10 and Transitional Provisions) Order 1997 (S.I. 1997/618)
- Housing (Right to Acquire) Regulations 1997 (S.I. 1997/619)
- Housing (Right to Acquire or Enfranchise) (Designated Rural Areas in the West Midlands) Order 1997 (S.I. 1997/620)
- Housing (Right to Acquire or Enfranchise) (Designated Rural Areas in the South West) Order 1997 (S.I. 1997/621)
- Housing (Right to Acquire or Enfranchise) (Designated Rural Areas in the North West and Merseyside) Order 1997 (S.I. 1997/622)
- Housing (Right to Acquire or Enfranchise) (Designated Rural Areas in the East) Order 1997 (S.I. 1997/623)
- Housing (Right to Acquire or Enfranchise) (Designated Rural Areas in the North East) Order 1997 (S.I. 1997/624)
- Housing (Right to Acquire or Enfranchise) (Designated Rural Areas in the South East) Order 1997 (S.I. 1997/625)
- Housing (Right to Acquire) (Discount) Order 1997 (S.I. 1997/626)
- Housing Act 1996 (Consequential Amendments) (No. 2) Order 1997 (S.I. 1997/627)
- Homelessness (Persons subject to Immigration Control) (Amendment) Order 1997 (S.I. 1997/628)
- Electricity and Pipe-line Works (Assessment of Environmental Effects) (Amendment) Regulations 1997 (S.I. 1997/629)
- Measuring Instruments (EEC Requirements) (Fees) (Amendment) Regulations 1997 (S.I. 1997/630)
- Allocation of Housing and Homelessness (Amendment) Regulations 1997 (S.I. 1997/631)
- Street Litter Control Notices (Amendment) Order 1997 (S.I. 1997/632)
- Litter Control Areas (Amendment) Order 1997 (S.I. 1997/633)
- Pensions Increase (Review) Order 1997 (S.I. 1997/634)
- Vocational Training (Public Financial Assistance and Disentitlement to Tax Relief) (Amendment) Regulations 1997 (S.I. 1997/635)
- Divorce etc. (Pensions) (Amendment) Regulations 1997 (S.I. 1997/636)
- Family Proceedings (Amendment) Rules 1997 (S.I. 1997/637)
- Medicines (Medicated Animal Feeding Stuffs) (Amendment) Regulations 1997 (S.I. 1997/638)
- Animals (Third Country Imports) (Charges) Regulations 1997 (S.I. 1997/639)
- Leasehold Reform (Notices) Regulations 1997 (S.I. 1997/640)
- New Town (Irvine) Dissolution Order 1997 (S.I. 1997/641)
- New Town (Livingston) Dissolution Order 1997 (S.I. 1997/642)
- New Town (Cumbernauld) Dissolution Order 1997 (S.I. 1997/643)
- Child Maintenance Bonus (Northern Ireland Reciprocal Arrangements) Regulations 1997 (S.I. 1997/645)
- National Health Service (Injury Benefits) Amendment Regulations 1997 (S.I. 1997/646)
- Merchant Shipping (Ro-Ro Passenger Ship Survivability) Regulations 1997 (S.I. 1997/647)
- Producer Responsibility Obligations (Packaging Waste) Regulations 1997 (S.I. 1997/648)
- Adoption Agencies and Children (Arrangements for Placement and Reviews) (Miscellaneous Amendments) Regulations 1997 (S.I. 1997/649)
- Motor Cars (Driving Instruction) (Amendment) Regulations 1997 (S.I. 1997/650)
- Financial Assistance for Environmental Purposes Order 1997 (S.I. 1997/651)
- National Health Service Trusts (Originating Capital Debt) Order 1997 (S.I. 1997/652)
- Insurance (Fees) Regulations 1997 (S.I. 1997/653)
- Good Laboratory Practice Regulations 1997 (S.I. 1997/654)
- Plant Health (Fees) (Forestry) (Great Britain) (Amendment) Regulations 1997 (S.I. 1997/655)
- Council Tax (Chargeable Dwellings, Exempt Dwellings and Discount Disregards) Amendment Order 1997 (S.I. 1997/656)
- Council Tax (Additional Provisions for Discount Disregards) Amendment Regulations 1997 (S.I. 1997/657)
- Wine and Made-wine (Amendment) Regulations 1997 (S.I. 1997/658)
- Cider and Perry (Amendment) Regulations 1997 (S.I. 1997/659)
- Capital Allowances (Corresponding Northern Ireland Grants) Order 1997 (S.I. 1997/660)
- Vocational Training (Tax Relief) (Amendment) Regulations 1997 (S.I. 1997/661)
- Pensions (Polish Forces) Scheme (Extension) Order 1997 (S.I. 1997/662)
- Occupational Pension Schemes (Prohibition of Trustees) Regulations 1997 (S.I. 1997/663)
- Pensions Act 1995 (Commencement No. 10) Order 1997 (S.I. 1997/664)
- Occupational Pension Schemes (Pensions Compensation Provisions) Regulations 1997 (S.I. 1997/665)
- Occupational and Personal Pension Schemes (Levy) Regulations 1997 (S.I. 1997/666)
- Civil Aviation (Navigation Services Charges) (Second Amendment) Regulations 1997 (S.I. 1997/667)
- Vehicle Inspectorate Trading Fund (Appropriation of Additional Assets) Order 1997 (S.I. 1997/668)
- Motor Vehicles (Driving Licences) (Amendment) (No. 2) Regulations 1997 (S.I. 1997/669)
- Party Wall etc. Act 1996 (Commencement) Order 1997 (S.I. 1997/670)
- Party Wall etc. Act 1996 (Repeal of Local Enactments) Order 1997 (S.I. 1997/671)
- Local Government Staff Commission (Scotland) (Winding Up) Order 1997 (S.I. 1997/672)
- Council Tax (Dwellings) (Scotland) Regulations 1997 (S.I. 1997/673)
- Local Government Superannuation (Scotland) Amendment Regulations 1997 (S.I. 1997/674)
- Teachers (Compensation for Premature Retirement and Redundancy) (Scotland) Amendment Regulations 1997 (S.I. 1997/675)
- Teachers' Superannuation (Scotland) Amendment Regulations 1997 (S.I. 1997/676)
- Certification Officer (Amendment of Fees) Regulations 1997 (S.I. 1997/677)
- Education (Grant) (Amendment) Regulations 1997 (S.I. 1997/678)
- Local Government Changes for England (Education) (Miscellaneous Provisions) Order 1997 (S.I. 1997/679)
- Education (Amount to Follow Permanently Excluded Pupil) Regulations 1997 (S.I. 1997/680)
- Criminal Procedure and Investigations Act 1996 (Appointed Day No. 3) Order 1997 (S.I. 1997/682)
- Criminal Procedure and Investigations Act 1996 (Commencement) (Section 65 and Schedules 1 and 2) Order 1997 (S.I. 1997/683)
- Criminal Procedure and Investigations Act 1996 (Defence Disclosure Time Limits) Regulations 1997 (S.I. 1997/684)
- Reform and Housing (Excluded Tenancies) (Designated Rural Areas) (Wales) Order 1997 (S.I. 1997/685)
- Insurance (Lloyd's) Regulations 1997 (S.I. 1997/686)
- Sheriff Court Fees Order 1997 (S.I. 1997/687)
- Court of Session etc. Fees Order 1997 (S.I. 1997/688)
- Civil Legal Aid (Scotland) (Fees) Amendment Regulations 1997 (S.I. 1997/689)
- Legal Aid (Scotland) (Children) Regulations 1997 (S.I. 1997/690)
- Children (Scotland) Act 1995 etc. (Revocations and Savings) (Scotland) Regulations 1997 (S.I. 1997/691)
- Children's Hearings (Scotland) Rules 1986 etc. (Revocations) (Scotland) Rules 1997 (S.I. 1997/692)
- Community Care (Direct Payments) (Scotland) Regulations 1997 (S.I. 1997/693)
- Medical Devices Fees (Amendment) Regulations 1997 (S.I. 1997/694)
- Common Police Services (Scotland) Order 1997 (S.I. 1997/695)
- National Health Service (Pharmaceutical Services) (Scotland) Amendment Regulations 1997 (S.I. 1997/696)
- National Health Service (Charges for Drugs and Appliances) (Scotland) Amendment Regulations 1997 (S.I. 1997/697)
- Crown Court (Criminal Procedure and Investigations Act 1996) (Disclosure) Rules 1997 (S.I. 1997/698)
- Crown Court (Criminal Procedures and Investigations Act 1996) (Confidentiality) Rules 1997 (S.I. 1997/699)
- Crown Court (Advance Notice of Expert Evidence) (Amendment) Rules 1997 (S.I. 1997/700)

== 701–800 ==
- Crown Court (Amendment) Rules 1997 (S.I. 1997/701)
- Criminal Appeal (Amendment) Rules 1997 (S.I. 1997/702)
- Magistrates' Courts (Criminal Procedure and Investigations Act 1996) (Disclosure) Rules 1997 (S.I. 1997/703)
- Magistrates' Courts (Criminal Procedure and Investigations Act 1996) (Confidentiality) Rules 1997 (S.I. 1997/704)
- Magistrates' Courts (Advance Notice of Expert Evidence) Rules 1997 (S.I. 1997/705)
- Magistrates' Courts (Amendment) Rules 1997 (S.I. 1997/706)
- Magistrates' Courts (Forms) (Amendment) Rules 1997 (S.I. 1997/707)
- Magistrates' Courts (Notices of Transfer) (Amendment) Rules 1997 (S.I. 1997/708)
- Magistrates' Courts (Notice of Transfer) (Children's Evidence) (Amendment) Rules 1997 (S.I. 1997/709)
- Justices' Clerks (Amendment) Rules 1997 (S.I. 1997/710)
- Indictments (Procedure) (Amendment) Rules 1997 (S.I. 1997/711)
- Electricity Generating Stations and Overhead Lines and Pipe-lines (Inquiries Procedure) (Amendment) Rules 1997 (S.I. 1997/712)
- Land Registration (Conduct of Business) Regulations 1997 (S.I. 1997/713)
- Reporters (Conduct of Proceedings before the Sheriff) (Scotland) Regulations 1997 (S.I. 1997/714)
- Grants for Pre-school Education (Scotland) Amendment Regulations 1997 (S.I. 1997/715)
- Registration of Births, Deaths, Marriages and Divorces (Fees) (Scotland) Regulations 1997 (S.I. 1997/716)
- Registration of Births, Deaths and Marriages (Fees) (Scotland) Order 1997 (S.I. 1997/717)
- Legal Aid in Contempt of Court Proceedings (Scotland) (Fees) Amendment Regulations 1997 (S.I. 1997/718)
- Criminal Legal Aid (Scotland) (Fees) Amendment Regulations 1997 (S.I. 1997/719)
- Local Government (Amendment of Regulations for Compensation on Reorganisation (Scotland) Regulations 1997 (S.I. 1997/720)
- Police Grant (Scotland) Order 1997 (S.I. 1997/721)
- Rural Diversification Programme (Scotland) Amendment Regulations 1997 (S.I. 1997/722)
- Food Premises (Registration) Amendment 1997 (S.I. 1997/723)
- Pensions Compensation Board (Determinations and Review Procedure) Regulations 1997 (S.I. 1997/724)
- Combined Probation Areas (Cleveland — Teesside) Order 1997 (S.I. 1997/725)
- Advice and Assistance (Scotland) Amendment Regulations 1997 (S.I. 1997/726)
- Civil Legal Aid (Scotland) Amendment Regulations 1997 (S.I. 1997/727)
- "Council Tax (Exempt Dwellings) (Scotland) Order 1997 (S.I. 1997/728 (This SI has been corrected by S.I. 1998/561))". opsi.gov.uk.
- Reporters (Appeals against Dismissal) (Scotland) Regulations 1997 (S.I. 1997/729)
- National Health Service (General Medical Services) Amendment Regulations 1997 (S.I. 1997/730)
- Workmen's Compensation (Supplementation) (Amendment) Scheme 1997 (S.I. 1997/731)
- Local Government Residual Body (England) (Amendment) Order 1997 (S.I. 1997/732)
- Dairy Produce Quotas Regulations 1997 (S.I. 1997/733)
- Community Care (Direct Payments) Regulations 1997 (S.I. 1997/734)
- Offshore Installations (Safety Zones) Order 1997 (S.I. 1997/735)
- Severn Trent Water Limited (Extension of Byelaws) Order 1997 (S.I. 1997/736)
- Criminal Justice Act 1987 (Notice of Transfer) (Amendment) Regulations 1997 (S.I. 1997/737)
- Criminal Justice Act 1991 (Notice of Transfer) (Amendment) Regulations 1997 (S.I. 1997/738)
- Prosecution of Offences (Revocation) Regulations 1997 (S.I. 1997/739)
- Building Societies (General Charge and Fees) Regulations 1997 (S.I. 1997/740)
- Friendly Societies (General Charge and Fees) Regulations 1997 (S.I. 1997/741)
- Industrial and Provident Societies (Credit Unions) (Amendment of Fees) Regulations 1997 (S.I. 1997/742)
- Industrial and Provident Societies (Amendment of Fees) Regulations 1997 (S.I. 1997/743)
- Children (Scotland) Act 1995 (Commencement No. 3) (Amendment and Transitional Provisions) Order 1997 (S.I. 1997/744)
- Divorce etc. (Pensions) (Scotland) Amendment Regulations 1997 (S.I. 1997/745)
- United Kingdom Central Council for Nursing, Midwifery and Health Visiting (Electoral Scheme) Variation Order 1997 (S.I. 1997/746)
- National Health Service (Fund-holding Practices) Amendment Regulations 1997 (S.I. 1997/747)
- National Health Service (Travelling Expenses and Remission of Charges) Amendment Regulations 1997 (S.I. 1997/748)
- Town and Country Planning (General Development Procedure) (Scotland) Amendment Order 1997 (S.I. 1997/749)
- Town and Country Planning Appeals (Determination by Appointed Person) (Inquiries Procedure) (Scotland) Rules 1997 (S.I. 1997/750)
- Legal Advice and Assistance (Amendment) Regulations 1997 (S.I. 1997/751)
- Legal Aid in Criminal and Care Proceedings (General) (Amendment) Regulations 1997 (S.I. 1997/752)
- Civil Legal Aid (Assessment of Resources) (Amendment) Regulations 1997 (S.I. 1997/753)
- Legal Aid in Criminal and Care Proceedings (Costs) (Amendment) Regulations 1997 (S.I. 1997/754)
- Education (School Teachers' Pay and Conditions) Order 1997 (S.I. 1997/755)
- Community Care (Direct Payments) Act 1996 (Commencement) Order 1997 (S.I. 1997/756)
- Enzootic Bovine Leukosis Order 1997 (S.I. 1997/757)
- Brucellosis Order 1997 (S.I. 1997/758)
- Isles of Scilly (Direct Payments Act) Order 1997 (S.I. 1997/759)
- Treasure Act 1996 (Commencement No. 1) Order 1997 (S.I. 1997/760)
- City of Manchester (Egerton Street Service Bridge Scheme) 1994 Confirmation Instrument 1997 (S.I. 1997/761)
- City of Manchester (Egerton Street West Bridge Scheme) 1994 Confirmation Instrument 1997 (S.I. 1997/762)
- A127 Trunk Road (M25 To Rayleigh Section and Slip Roads) (Detrunking) Order 1997 (S.I. 1997/763)
- A570 Trunk Road (Southport–Pinfold) (40 Miles Per Hour Speed Limit) Order 1997 (S.I. 1997/773)
- Parliamentary Elections (Returning Officer's Charges) (Northern Ireland) Order 1997 (S.I. 1997/774)
- Borough of Thurrock (Electoral Changes) Order 1997 (S.I. 1997/775)
- District of the Medway Towns (Parishes and Electoral Changes) Order 1997 (S.I. 1997/776)
- City of Peterborough (Parishes and Electoral Changes) Order 1997 (S.I. 1997/777)
- Rent Officers (Housing Renewal Grants Functions) Order 1997 (S.I. 1997/778)
- Borough of Halton (Electoral Changes) Order 1997 (S.I. 1997/779)
- District of The Wrekin (Parishes and Electoral Changes) Order 1997 (S.I. 1997/780)
- Borough of Warrington (Parishes and Electoral Changes) Order 1997 (S.I. 1997/781)
- Borough of Blackburn (Parishes and Electoral Changes) Order 1997 (S.I. 1997/782)
- Borough of Blackpool (Electoral Changes) Order 1997 (S.I. 1997/783)
- Occupational Pension Schemes (Discharge of Liability) Regulations 1997 (S.I. 1997/784)
- Occupational Pension Schemes (Assignment, Forfeiture, Bankruptcy etc.) Regulations 1997 (S.I. 1997/785)
- Personal and Occupational Pension Schemes (Miscellaneous Amendments) Regulations 1997 (S.I. 1997/786)
- County Court Fees (Amendment) Order 1997 (S.I. 1997/787)
- Family Proceedings Fees (Amendment) Order 1997 (S.I. 1997/788)
- Young Offender Institution (Amendment) Rules 1997 (S.I. 1997/789)
- Home Energy Efficiency Scheme Regulations 1997 (S.I. 1997/790)
- Jobseeker's Allowance (Workskill Courses) Pilot Regulations 1997 (S.I. 1997/791)
- Social Security (Social Fund and Claims and Payments) (Miscellaneous Amendments) Regulations 1997 (S.I. 1997/792)
- Social Security (Miscellaneous Amendments) (No. 2) Regulations 1997 (S.I. 1997/793)
- Occupational Pensions Regulatory Authority (Determinations and Review Procedure) Regulations 1997 (S.I. 1997/794)
- Act of Sedurant (Rules of the Court of Session Amendment No. 1) (Part I Orders) 1997 (S.I. 1997/795)
- Town and Country Planning (Inquiries Procedure) (Scotland) Rules 1997 (S.I. 1997/796)
- Homelessness (Isles of Scilly) Order 1997 (S.I. 1997/797)
- Reserve Forces Appeal Tribunals Rules 1997 (S.I. 1997/798)
- Electricity (Non-Fossil Fuel Sources) (Scotland) Order 1997 (S.I. 1997/799)

== 801–900 ==
- Mental Health (Hospital, Guardianship and Consent to Treatment) Amendment Regulations 1997 (S.I. 1997/801)
- Child Support Commissioners (Procedure) (Amendment) Regulations 1997 (S.I. 1997/802)
- Energy Information (Washing Machines) (Amendment) Regulations 1997 (S.I. 1997/803)
- Medicines Control Agency Trading Fund (Variation) Order 1997 (S.I. 1997/805)
- Family Credit and Disability Allowance (General) Amendment Regulations 1997 (S.I. 1997/806)
- Prevention of Terrorism (Temporary Provisions) Act 1989 (Continuance) Order 1997 (S.I. 1997/807)
- Combined Probation Areas (Lincolnshire) Order 1997 (S.I. 1997/808)
- Local Authorities (Goods and Services) (Public Bodies) (Greater London Enterprise Limited) Order 1997 (S.I. 1997/809)
- Social Security (Industrial Injuries) (Miscellaneous Amendments) Regulations 1997 (S.I. 1997/810)
- War Pensions (Mercantile Marine) (Amendment) Scheme 1997 (S.I. 1997/811)
- Personal Injuries (Civilians) Amendment Scheme 1997 (S.I. 1997/812)
- Bovine Hides Regulations 1997 (S.I. 1997/813)
- Sweeteners in Food (Amendment) Regulations 1997 (S.I. 1997/814)
- Motor Vehicle Tyres (Safety) (Amendment) Regulations 1997 (S.I. 1997/815)
- Financial Services Act 1986 (Corporate Debt Exemption) Order 1997 (S.I. 1997/816)
- Banking Act 1987 (Exempt Transactions ) Regulations 1997 (S.I. 1997/817)
- National Health Service (Optical Charges and Payments) Regulations 1997 (S.I. 1997/818)
- Occupational Pension Schemes (Reference Scheme and Miscellaneous Amendments) Regulations 1997 (S.I. 1997/819)
- Social Security (Contributions) Amendment (No. 3) Regulations 1997 (S.I. 1997/820)
- Channel Tunnel Rail Link (Planning Appeals) Regulations 1997 (S.I. 1997/821)
- Channel Tunnel Rail Link (Fees for Requests for Planning Approval) Regulations 1997 (S.I. 1997/822)
- Workmen's Compensation (Supplementation) (Amendment) (No. 2) Scheme 1997 (S.I. 1997/823)
- Pneumoconiosis, Byssinosis and Miscellaneous Diseases Benefit (Amendment) Scheme 1997 (S.I. 1997/824)
- Gas (Extent of Domestic Supply Licences) Order 1997 (S.I. 1997/826)
- Social Security and Child Support (Miscellaneous Amendments) Regulations 1997 (S.I. 1997/827)
- Farm Woodland (Amendment) Scheme 1997 (S.I. 1997/828)
- Farm Woodland Premium Scheme 1997 (S.I. 1997/829)
- Loch Ewe, Isle of Ewe, Wester Ross, Scallops Several Fishery Order 1997 (S.I. 1997/830)
- Lifts Regulations 1997 (S.I. 1997/831)
- West Cheshire National Health Service Trust Dissolution Order 1997 (S.I. 1997/832)
- Wirral and West Cheshire Community National Health Service Trust (Establishment) Order 1997 (S.I. 1997/833)
- Wirral Community Healthcare National Health Service Trust Dissolution Order 1997 (S.I. 1997/834)
- Calderdale Healthcare National Health Service Trust (Establishment) Amendment Order 1997 (S.I. 1997/835)
- Worcester Royal Infirmary National Health Service Trust (Establishment) Amendment Order 1997 (S.I. 1997/836)
- Carlisle Hospitals National Health Service Trust (Establishment) Amendment Order 1997 (S.I. 1997/837)
- Caribbean Development Bank (Further Payments) Order 1997 (S.I. 1997/838)
- African Development Fund (Seventh Replenishment) Order 1997 (S.I. 1997/839)
- International Development Association (Interim Trust Fund) Order 1997 (S.I. 1997/840)
- Civil Procedure Act 1997 (Commencement No. 1) Order 1997 (S.I. 1997/841)
- A406 London North Circular Trunk Road (East London River Crossing (A13 to A2)) Orders 1988 and 1991, Revocation Order 1997 (S.I. 1997/842)
- Registration of Births and Deaths (Amendment) Regulations 1997 (S.I. 1997/844)
- Local Government Act 1988 (Defined Activities) (Exemption) (Rushcliffe Borough Council) Order 1997 (S.I. 1997/845)
- Motor Vehicles (Driving Licences) (Amendment) (No. 3) Regulations 1997 (S.I. 1997/846)
- M4 Motorway (Heathrow Airport Spur Road) (Bus Lane) Regulations 1997 (S.I. 1997/847)
- Local Authorities (Capital Finance) (Amendment) Regulations 1997 (S.I. 1997/848)
- Local Authorities (Goods and Services) (Public Bodies) (Trunk Roads) (Amendment) Order 1997 (S.I. 1997/849)
- Local Authorities (Goods and Services) (Public Bodies) (Trunk Roads) (No. 2) Order 1997 (S.I. 1997/850)
- Superannuation (Admission to Schedule 1 to the Superannuation Act 1972) (No. 3) Order 1997 (S.I. 1997/851)
- Housing Benefit and Council Tax Benefit (General) Amendment Regulations 1997 (S.I. 1997/852)
- Act of Sederunt (Rules of the Court of Session Amendment No. 2) (Adoption Applications) 1997 (S.I. 1997/853)
- Act of Sederunt (Rules of the Court of Session Amendment No. 3) (Human Fertilisation and Embryology) 1997 (S.I. 1997/854)
- Medicines (Bal Jivan Chamcho Prohibition) (No. 2) Amendment Order 1997 (S.I. 1997/856)
- Welfare Food (Amendment) Regulations 1997 (S.I. 1997/857)
- Town and Country Planning (General Development Procedure) (Amendment) Order 1997 (S.I. 1997/858)
- Amusement Machine Licence Duty (Amendment) Regulations 1997 (S.I. 1997/859)
- Education (Inner London Education Authority) (Property Transfer) (Modification and Amendment) Order 1997 (S.I. 1997/860)
- House of Commons Disqualification Order 1997 (S.I. 1997/861)
- Local Authorities (Armorial Bearings) Order 1997 (S.I. 1997/862)
- European Communities (Definition of Treaties) (Euro-Mediterranean Agreement establishing an Association between the European Communities and their Member States and the State of Israel) Order 1997 (S.I. 1997/863)
- Falkland Islands Constitution (Amendment) Order 1997 (S.I. 1997/864)
- Appropriation (Northern Ireland) Order 1997 (S.I. 1997/865)
- Education (Northern Ireland) Order 1997 (S.I. 1997/866)
- Local Elections (Northern Ireland) (Amendment) Order 1997 (S.I. 1997/867)
- Local Elections (Variation of Limits of Candidates' Election Expenses) (Northern Ireland) Order 1997 (S.I. 1997/868)
- Race Relations (Northern Ireland) Order 1997 (S.I. 1997/869)
- European Convention on Cinematographic Co-production (Amendment) Order 1997 (S.I. 1997/870)
- Social Security (Jamaica) Order 1997 (S.I. 1997/871)
- Housing (Prescribed Forms) (Amendment) Regulations 1997 (S.I. 1997/872)
- Driving Standards Agency Trading Fund Order 1997 (S.I. 1997/873)
- European Parliamentary Elections (Amentment) Regulations 1997 (S.I. 1997/874)
- Derwen National Health Service Trust (Dissolution) Order 1997 (S.I. 1997/875)
- Pembrokeshire and Derwen National Health Service Trust (Establishment) Order 1997 (S.I. 1997/876)
- Pembrokeshire National Health Service Trust (Dissolution) Order 1997 (S.I. 1997/877)
- Water Undertakers (Extension of Byelaws) Order 1997 (S.I. 1997/878)
- Representation of the People (Variation of Limits of Candidates' Election Expenses) Order 1997 (S.I. 1997/879)
- Representation of the People (Amendment) Regulations 1997 (S.I. 1997/880)
- Air Navigation (General) (Amendment) Regulations 1997 (S.I. 1997/881)
- Criminal Justice and Public Order Act 1994 (Commencement No. 11 and Transitional Provision) Order 1997 (S.I. 1997/882)
- Sea Fishing (Enforcement of Community Quota Measures) Order 1997 (S.I. 1997/883)
- Plant Protection Products (Fees) (Amendment) Regulations 1997 (S.I. 1997/884)
- Public Telecommunication System Designation (ACC Long Distance UK Ltd) Order 1997 (S.I. 1997/886)
- Public Telecommunication System Designation (AT&T Communications (UK) Ltd) Order 1997 (S.I. 1997/887)
- Public Telecommunication System Designation (CableTel (UK) Ltd) Order 1997 (S.I. 1997/888)
- Public Telecommunication System Designation (COLT Telecommunications) Order 1997 (S.I. 1997/889)
- Public Telecommunication System Designation (Communicorp (UK) Ltd) Order 1997 (S.I. 1997/890)
- Public Telecommunication System Designation (Concert Communications Company) Order 1997 (S.I. 1997/891)
- Public Telecommunication System Designation (Convergence Ventures Ltd) Order 1997 (S.I. 1997/892)
- Public Telecommunication System Designation (Energis Communications Ltd) Order 1997 (S.I. 1997/893)
- Public Telecommunication System Designation (Esat Telecommunications (UK) Ltd) Order 1997 (S.I. 1997/894)
- Public Telecommunication System Designation (Esprit Telecom UK Ltd) Order 1997 (S.I. 1997/895)
- Public Telecommunication System Designation (Eurotunnel) Order 1997 (S.I. 1997/896)
- Public Telecommunication System Designation (Facilicom International (UK) Ltd) Order 1997 (S.I. 1997/897)
- Public Telecommunication System Designation (Frontel Newco Ltd) Order 1997 (S.I. 1997/898)
- Public Telecommunication System Designation (Global One Communications Holding Ltd) Order 1997 (S.I. 1997/899)
- Public Telecommunication System Designation (Hermes Europe Railtel B.V.) Order 1997 (S.I. 1997/900)

== 901–1000 ==
- Public Telecommunication System Designation (Spacetel International Ltd) Order 1997 (S.I. 1997/901)
- Public Telecommunication System Designation (ScottishPower Telecommunications Ltd) Order 1997 (S.I. 1997/902)
- Public Telecommunication System Designation (RSL Communications Ltd) Order 1997 (S.I. 1997/903)
- Public Telecommunication System Designation (Racal Telecommunications Ltd) Order 1997 (S.I. 1997/904)
- Public Telecommunication System Designation (Primus Telecommunications Ltd) Order 1997 (S.I. 1997/905)
- Public Telecommunication System Designation (MCI Telecommunications Ltd) Order 1997 (S.I. 1997/906)
- Public Telecommunication System Designation (National Transcommunications Ltd) Order 1997 (S.I. 1997/907)
- Public Telecommunication System Designation (MFS Communications Ltd) Order 1997 (S.I. 1997/908)
- Public Telecommunication System Designation (L D I Communications Ltd) Order 1997 (S.I. 1997/909)
- Public Telecommunication System Designation (Pacific Gateway Exchange (UK) Ltd) Order 1997 (S.I. 1997/910)
- Public Telecommunication System Designation (Interoute Networks Ltd) Order 1997 (S.I. 1997/911)
- Public Telecommunication System Designation (Incom (UK) Ltd) Order 1997 (S.I. 1997/912)
- Public Telecommunication System Designation (ITG (UK) Ltd) Order 1997 (S.I. 1997/913)
- Public Telecommunication System Designation (IXNET UK Ltd) Order 1997 (S.I. 1997/914)
- Public Telecommunication System Designation (Net. Net Ltd) Order 1997 (S.I. 1997/915)
- Public Telecommunication System Designation (Advanced Business Services Ltd) Order 1997 (S.I. 1997/916)
- Public Telecommunication System Designation (Star Europe Ltd) Order 1997 (S.I. 1997/917)
- Public Telecommunication System Designation (TeleBermuda International (UK) Ltd) Order 1997 (S.I. 1997/918)
- Public Telecommunication System Designation (Telecom New Zealand Ltd) Order 1997 (S.I. 1997/919)
- Public Telecommunication System Designation (Teleglobe International (UK) Ltd) Order 1997 (S.I. 1997/920)
- Public Telecommunication System Designation (TMI TeleMedia International Ltd) Order 1997 (S.I. 1997/921)
- Public Telecommunication System Designation (Teleport London International Ltd) Order 1997 (S.I. 1997/922)
- Public Telecommunication System Designation (Telewest Communications plc) (No. 2) Order 1997 (S.I. 1997/923)
- Public Telecommunication System Designation (Telia UK Ltd) Order 1997 (S.I. 1997/924)
- Public Telecommunication System Designation (Telstra (UK) Ltd) Order 1997 (S.I. 1997/925)
- Public Telecommunication System Designation (Torch Communications Ltd) Order 1997 (S.I. 1997/926)
- Public Telecommunication System Designation (Unisource Holding (UK) Ltd) Order 1997 (S.I. 1997/927)
- Public Telecommunication System Designation (Videotron No. 2 Ltd) Order 1997 (S.I. 1997/928)
- Public Telecommunication System Designation (Vodafone Ltd) Order 1997 (S.I. 1997/929)
- Public Telecommunication System Designation (Worldcom International Inc) Order 1997 (S.I. 1997/930)
- Third Country Fishing (Enforcement) Order 1997 (S.I. 1997/931)
- Jobseeker's Allowance (Members of the Forces) (Northern Ireland) Regulations 1997 (S.I. 1997/932)
- Queen Elizabeth II Conference Centre Trading Fund Order 1997 (S.I. 1997/933)
- Local Government Act 1988 (Defined Activities) (Housing Management) (Exemptions) (Wales) Order 1997 (S.I. 1997/934)
- Local Government Act 1988 (Competition) (Housing Management) (Wales) Regulations 1997 (S.I. 1997/935)
- Companies Act 1985 (Audit Exemption) (Amendment) Regulations 1997 (S.I. 1997/936)
- Gas (Calculation of Thermal Energy) (Amendment) Regulations 1997 (S.I. 1997/937)
- Local Government Finance (Scotland) Order 1997 (S.I. 1997/938)
- Revenue Support Grant (Scotland) Order 1997 (S.I. 1997/939)
- Housing Support Grant (Scotland) Order 1997 (S.I. 1997/940)
- Deregulation (Gaming on Sunday in Scotland) Order 1997 (S.I. 1997/941)
- Gaming Clubs (Hours and Charges) (Scotland) Amendment Regulations 1997 (S.I. 1997/942)
- National Health Service (General Medical Services) (Scotland) Amendment Regulations 1997 (S.I. 1997/943)
- Income Support (General) (Standard Interest Rate Amendment) Regulations 1997 (S.I. 1997/944)
- Housing (Right to Buy) (Priority of Charges) Order 1997 (S.I. 1997/945)
- Occupational Pension Schemes (Age-related Payments) Regulations 1997 (S.I. 1997/946)
- Deregulation (Betting Licensing) Order 1997 (S.I. 1997/947)
- Ipswich Port Authority Transfer Scheme 1996 Confirmation Order 1997 (S.I. 1997/948)
- Courses for Drink-Drive Offenders (Experimental Period) Order 1997 (S.I. 1997/949)
- Deregulation (Casinos) Order 1997 (S.I. 1997/950)
- Local Government Pension Scheme (Provision of Information, Administrative Expenses and Restitution) Regulations 1997 (S.I. 1997/954)
- Social Security (Adjudication) and Commissioners Procedure and Child Support Commissioners (Procedure) Amendment Regulations 1997 (S.I. 1997/955)
- Education (New Grant-maintained Schools) (Finance) Regulations 1997 (S.I. 1997/956)
- Deregulation (Employment in Bars) Order 1997 (S.I. 1997/957)
- Fire Services (Appointments and Promotion) (Amendment) Regulations 1997 (S.I. 1997/959)
- Non-Domestic Rating (Chargeable Amounts for Small Hereditaments) Amendment Regulations 1997 (S.I. 1997/960)
- British Gas plc (Rateable Values) (Amendment) Order 1997 (S.I. 1997/961)
- Contracting Out (functions of the Registrar General in relation to authorising re-registration of births) Order 1997 (S.I. 1997/962)
- Financial Services Act 1986 (Investment Advertisements) (Exemptions) Order 1997 (S.I. 1997/963)
- Charities (Dormant Accounts) (Scotland) Amendment Regulations 1997 (S.I. 1997/964)
- Grants for Improvement of School Security (Scotland) Regulations 1997 (S.I. 1997/965)
- Friendly Societies (Insurance Business) (Amendment) Regulations 1997 (S.I. 1997/966)
- Representation of the People (Northern Ireland) (Amendment) Regulations 1997 (S.I. 1997/967)
- Sheep Scab Order 1997 (S.I. 1997/968)
- European Parliamentary Elections (Northern Ireland) (Amendment) Regulations 1997 (S.I. 1997/969)
- Environmentally Sensitive Areas (Cambrian Mountains) Designation (Amendment) Order 1997 (S.I. 1997/970)
- Environmentally Sensitive Areas (Cambrian Mountains — Extension) Designation (Amendment) Order 1997 (S.I. 1997/971)
- Environmentally Sensitive Areas (Lleyn Peninsula) Designation (Amendment) Order 1997 (S.I. 1997/972)
- Environmentally Sensitive Areas (Clwydian Range) Designation (Amendment) Order 1997 (S.I. 1997/973)
- Environmentally Sensitive Areas (Preseli) Designation (Amendment) Order 1997 (S.I. 1997/974)
- Environmentally Sensitive Areas (Ynys Môn) Designation (Amendment) Order 1997 (S.I. 1997/975)
- Environmentally Sensitive Areas (Radnor) Designation (Amendment) Order 1997 (S.I. 1997/976)
- Housing Renewal Grants (Amendment) Regulations 1997 (S.I. 1997/977)
- Housing Renewal Grants (Prescribed Form and Particulars) (Amendment) Regulations 1997 (S.I. 1997/978)
- Representation of the People (Scotland) Amendment Regulations 1997 (S.I. 1997/979)
- National Health Service (Indicative Amounts) Regulations 1997 (S.I. 1997/980)
- National Health Service (General Medical Services) Amendment (No. 2) Regulations 1997 (S.I. 1997/981)
- Jobseeker's Allowance (Contract for Work) Regulations 1997 (S.I. 1997/982)
- Jobseeker's Allowance (Project Work Pilot Scheme) Regulations 1997 (S.I. 1997/983)
- Jobseeker's Allowance (Project Work Pilot Scheme) (No. 2) Regulations 1997 (S.I. 1997/984)
- Public Works Loans (Fees) (Amendment) Regulations 1997 (S.I. 1997/985)
- Deregulation (Validity of Civil Preliminaries to Marriage) Order 1997 (S.I. 1997/986)
- Stock Lending and Manufactured Payments (Revocations and Amendments) Regulations 1997 (S.I. 1997/987)
- Income Tax (Manufactured Overseas Dividends) (Amendment) Regulations 1997 (S.I. 1997/988)
- Electricity (Class Exemptions from the Requirement for a Licence) Order 1997 (S.I. 1997/989)
- Nitrate Sensitive Areas (Amendment) Regulations 1997 (S.I. 1997/990)
- Finance Act 1997, Schedule 10 (Appointed Day) Order 1997 (S.I. 1997/991)
- Manufactured Interest (Tax) Regulations 1997 (S.I. 1997/992)
- Manufactured Dividends (Tax) Regulations 1997 (S.I. 1997/993)
- Free Zone (Port of Sheerness) (Substitution of Responsible Authority) Order 1997 (S.I. 1997/994)
- Education (School Inspection) (No. 2) (Amendment) Regulations 1997 (S.I. 1997/995)
- Education (Grant-maintained and Grant-maintained Special Schools) (Finance) Regulations 1997 (S.I. 1997/996)
- Legal Advice and Assistance (Scope) (Amendment) Regulations 1997 (S.I. 1997/997)
- Legal Aid (Functions) Order 1997 (S.I. 1997/998)
- Local Authorities (Direct Labour Organisations) (Competition) (Wales) Regulations 1997 (S.I. 1997/999)
- Rent Officers (Additional Functions) (Amendment) Order 1997 (S.I. 1997/1000)

== 1001–1100 ==
- Misuse of Drugs (Supply to Addicts) Regulations 1997 (S.I. 1997/1001)
- Kingston and District Community National Health Service Trust (Establishment) Amendment Order 1997 (S.I. 1997/1002)
- Rent Officers (Additional Functions) (Scotland) Amendment Order 1997 (S.I. 1997/1003)
- Housing Benefit and Council Tax Benefit (Subsidy) Order 1997 (S.I. 1997/1004)
- Broadcasting Act 1996 (Commencement No. 2) Order 1997 (S.I. 1997/1005)
- Wireless Telegraphy (Licence Charges) (Amendment) Regulaltions 1997 (S.I. 1997/1006)
- Dual-Use and Related Goods (Export Control) (Amendment No. 2) Regulations 1997 (S.I. 1997/1007)
- Export of Goods (Control) (Amendment No. 2) Order 1997 (S.I. 1997/1008)
- Social Security (Incapacity for Work and Severe Disablement Allowance) Amendment Regulations 1997 (S.I. 1997/1009)
- Legal Aid in Criminal and Care Proceedings (Costs) (Amendment) (No. 2) Regulations 1997 (S.I. 1997/1010)
- London Priority Route (Amendment) Order 1997 (S.I. 1997/1011)
- National Health Service (Travelling Expenses and Remission of Charges) (Scotland) Amendment Regulations 1997 (S.I. 1997/1012)
- National Health Service (Optical Charges and Payments) (Scotland) Amendment Regulations 1997 (S.I. 1997/1013)
- National Health Service (Fund-Holding Practices) (Scotland) Regulations 1997 (S.I. 1997/1014)
- Finance Act 1996, section 197, (Appointed Day) Order 1997 (S.I. 1997/1015)
- Air Passenger Duty and Other Indirect Taxes (Interest Rate) Regulations 1997 (S.I. 1997/1016)
- Criminal Procedure and Investigations Act 1996 (Appointed Day No. 4) Order 1997 (S.I. 1997/1019)
- Criminal Procedure and Investigations Act 1996 (Code of Practice) (No. 2) Order 1997 (S.I. 1997/1033)
- Parliamentary Elections (Returning Officers' Charges) Order 1997 (S.I. 1997/1034)
- Social Security (Contributions) Amendment (No. 4) Regulations 1997 (S.I. 1997/1045)
- Northern Ireland (Entry to Negotiations, etc.) Act 1996 (Cessation of Section 3) Order 1997 (S.I. 1997/1046)
- British Gas plc. (Rateable Values) (Scotland) Amendment Order 1997 (S.I. 1997/1048)
- Education Authority Bursaries and Students' Allowances (Scotland) Amendment Regulations 1997 (S.I. 1997/1049)
- Act of Sederunt (Rules of the Court of Session Amendment No. 4) (Miscellaneous) 1997 (S.I. 1997/1050)
- Criminal Justice Act 1987 (Preparatory Hearings) Rules 1997 (S.I. 1997/1051)
- Criminal Procedure and Investigations Act 1996 (Preparatory Hearings) Rules 1997 (S.I. 1997/1052)
- Criminal Procedure and Investigations Act 1996 (Preparatory Hearings) (Interlocutory Appeals) Rules 1997 (S.I. 1997/1053)
- Crown Court (Criminal Procedure and Investigations Act 1996) (Tainted Acquittals) Rules 1997 (S.I. 1997/1054)
- Magistrates' Courts (Criminal Procedure and Investigations Act 1996) (Tainted Acquittals) Rules 1997 (S.I. 1997/1055)
- Family Proceedings (Amendment No. 2) Rules 1997 (S.I. 1997/1056)
- Combined Probation Areas (West Midlands) Order 1997 (S.I. 1997/1059)
- Data Protection (Regulation of Financial Services etc.) (Subject Access Exemption) (Amendment) Order 1997 (S.I. 1997/1060)
- Licensed Betting Offices (Amendment) Regulations 1997 (S.I. 1997/1071)
- Gaming (Records of Cheques and Debit Card Payments) Regulations 1997 (S.I. 1997/1072)
- Deregulation (Football Pools) Order 1997 (S.I. 1997/1073)
- Deregulation (Betting and Bingo Advertising etc.) Order 1997 (S.I. 1997/1074)
- Deregulation (Casinos and Bingo Clubs: Debit Cards) Order 1997 (S.I. 1997/1075)
- Firearms (Amendment) Act 1997 (Commencement) (No. 1) Order 1997 (S.I. 1997/1076)
- Family Law Act 1996 (Commencement No. 1) Order 1997 (S.I. 1997/1077)
- Legal Aid (Mediation in Family Matters) Regulations 1997 (S.I. 1997/1078)
- Civil Legal Aid (General) (Amendment No. 2) Regulations 1997 (S.I. 1997/1079)
- Family Proceedings Fees (Amendment) (No. 2) Order 1997 (S.I. 1997/1080)
- Timeshare Regulations 1997 (S.I. 1997/1081)
- Merchant Shipping and Maritime Security Act 1997 (Commencement No. 1) Order 1997 (S.I. 1997/1082)
- Essex and Herts Community National Health Service Trust (Transfer of Trust Property) Order 1997 (S.I. 1997/1083)
- Reporters (Conduct of Proceedings before the Sheriff) (Scotland) (Amendment) Regulations 1997 (S.I. 1997/1084)
- Civil Courts (Amendment) (No. 2) Order 1997 (S.I. 1997/1085)
- Value Added Tax (Amendment) Regulations 1997 (S.I. 1997/1086)
- Sheffield Development Corporation (Dissolution) Order 1997 (S.I. 1997/1091)
- Local Government Act 1988 (Defined Activities) (Exemption) (Daventry District Council) Order 1997 (S.I. 1997/1092)
- Dairy Produce Quotas (Amendment) (Time Limits) Regulations 1997 (S.I. 1997/1093)
- Licensed Betting Offices (Scotland) Amendment Regulations 1997 (S.I. 1997/1095)
- Road Vehicles (Construction and Use) (Amendment) (No. 2) Regulations 1997 (S.I. 1997/1096)
- Local Government and Rating Act 1997 (Commencement No. 1) Order 1997 (S.I. 1997/1097)
- New Drivers (Appeals Procedure) Regulations 1997 (S.I. 1997/1098)

== 1101–1200 ==
- Town and Country Planning (Compensation for Restrictions on Mineral Working and Mineral Waste Depositing) Regulations 1997 (S.I. 1997/1111)
- Civil Legal Aid (Financial Conditions) (Scotland) Regulations 1997 (S.I. 1997/1112)
- Advice and Assistance (Financial Conditions) (Scotland) Regulations 1997 (S.I. 1997/1113)
- Northern Ireland (Emergency and Prevention of Terrorism Provisions) (Continuance) Order 1997 (S.I. 1997/1114)
- West of Scotland Water Authority (Dervaig-River Bellart) Water Order 1997 (S.I. 1997/1115)
- London Cab Order 1997 (S.I. 1997/1116)
- Social Security Revaluation of Earnings Factors Order 1997 (S.I. 1997/1117)
- Act of Sederunt (Fees of Shorthand Writers in the Sheriff Court) (Amendment) 1997 (S.I. 1997/1118)
- Professions Supplementary to Medicine (Arts Therapists Board) Order of Council 1997 (S.I. 1997/1121)
- A40 Trunk Road (Western Avenue, Ealing) (Prescribed Routes) Order 1997 (S.I. 1997/1122)
- Deregulation (Occasional Permissions) Order 1997 (S.I. 1997/1133)
- Crown Agents Act 1995 (Appointed Day) Order 1997 (S.I. 1997/1139)
- Crown Agents Act 1995 (Successor Company) Order 1997 (S.I. 1997/1140)
- Deregulation (Provision of School Action Plans) Order 1997 (S.I. 1997/1142)
- Local Government Superannuation (Scottish Environment Protection Agency) (Scotland) Regulations 1997 (S.I. 1997/1143)
- Plant Health (Great Britain) (Amendment) Order 1997 (S.I. 1997/1145)
- Integrated Administration and Control System (Amendment) Regulations 1997 (S.I. 1997/1148)
- Foreign Satellite Service Proscription Order 1997 (S.I. 1997/1150)
- Dangerous Dogs (Amendment) Act 1997 (Commencement) Order 1997 (S.I. 1997/1151)
- Dangerous Dogs (Fees) Order 1997 (S.I. 1997/1152)
- Education Act 1997 (Commencement No. 1) Order 1997 (S.I. 1997/1153)
- Open-ended Investment Companies (Tax) Regulations 1997 (S.I. 1997/1154)
- Exchange Gains and Losses (Insurance Companies) (Amendment) Regulations 1997 (S.I. 1997/1155)
- Stamp Duty and Stamp Duty Reserve Tax (Open-ended Investment Companies) Regulations 1997 (S.I. 1997/1156)
- Insurance Premium Tax (Amendment) Regulations 1997 (S.I. 1997/1157)
- Income Tax (Schedule 22 to the Finance Act 1995) (Prescribed Amounts) Regulations 1997 (S.I. 1997/1158)
- Police and Criminal Evidence Act 1984 (Codes of Practice No. 4) Order 1997 (S.I. 1997/1159)
- Hedgerows Regulations 1997 (S.I. 1997/1160)
- Worcester College of Agriculture (Dissolution) Order 1997 (S.I. 1997/1168)
- Southampton University Hospitals National Health Service Trust (Transfer of Trust Property) Order 1997 (S.I. 1997/1171)
- Southampton Community Health Services National Health Service Trust (Transfer of Trust Property) Order 1997 (S.I. 1997/1172)
- South and West Devon Health Authority (Transfers of Trust Property) Order 1997 (S.I. 1997/1173)
- European Communities (Designation) Order 1997 (S.I. 1997/1174)
- Iraq and Kuwait (United Nations Sanctions) (Dependent Territories) (Amendment) Order 1997 (S.I. 1997/1175)
- Brazil (Extradition) Order 1997 (S.I. 1997/1176)
- Health Services (Primary Care) (Northern Ireland) Order 1997 (S.I. 1997/1177)
- Hong Kong (Extradition) Order 1997 (S.I. 1997/1178)
- Property (Northern Ireland) Order 1997 (S.I. 1997/1179)
- Protection from Harassment (Northern Ireland) Order 1997 (S.I. 1997/1180)
- Public Order (Amendment) (Northern Ireland) Order 1997 (S.I. 1997/1181)
- Social Security Administration (Fraud) (Northern Ireland) Order 1997 (S.I. 1997/1182)
- Social Security (Recovery of Benefits) (Northern Ireland) Order 1997 (S.I. 1997/1183)
- Deregulation (Non-Fossil Fuel) Order 1997 (S.I. 1997/1185)
- South Lincolnshire Community and Mental Health Services National Health Service Trust (Establishment) Amendment Order 1997 (S.I. 1997/1186)
- Deregulation (Public Health Acts Amendment Act 1907) Order 1997 (S.I. 1997/1187)
- County Council of the Royal County of Berkshire A329(M) Special Road Variation Scheme 1996 Confirmation Instrument 1997 (S.I. 1997/1188)
- Act of Sederunt (Legal Aid Rules) (Children) (Amendment) 1997 (S.I. 1997/1194)

== 1201–1300 ==
- A41 Trunk Road (Barnet) Red Route (No. 2) Traffic Order 1997 (S.I. 1997/1210)
- A23 Trunk Road (Croydon) Red Route Traffic Order 1997 (S.I. 1997/1211)
- Offshore Installations (Safety Zones) (No. 2) Order 1997 (S.I. 1997/1220)
- A41 Trunk Road (Baker Street, Westminster) Red Route (Prohibited Turn) Traffic Order 1997 (S.I. 1997/1222)
- A406 Trunk Road (Brent) Red Route Traffic Order 1997 (S.I. 1997/1223)
- A406 Trunk Road (Brent) Red Route (Prohibited Turn) Traffic Order 1997 (S.I. 1997/1224)
- Glan Hafren National Health Service Trust (Establishment) Amendment Order 1997 (S.I. 1997/1225)
- A46 Trunk Road (Newark To Lincoln Improvement) (Brough Bypass) (Detrunking) Order 1997 (S.I. 1997/1236)
- A46 Trunk Road (Newark to Lincoln Improvement) (Brough Bypass) Order 1997 (S.I. 1997/1237)
- A41 Trunk Road (Barnet) Red Route Traffic Order 1997 Variation Order 1997 (S.I. 1997/1257)
- Act of Sedurant (Rules of the Court of Session Amendment No. 5) (Transcripts of Evidence and Attendance Fees for Shorthand Writers etc.) 1997 (S.I. 1997/1260)
- Act of Sedurant (Fees of Shorthand Writers in the Sheriff Court) (Amendment No. 2) 1997 (S.I. 1997/1265)
- Greater Manchester (Light Rapid Transit System) (Airport Extension) Order 1997 (S.I. 1997/1266)
- European Parliamentary (United Kingdom Representatives) Pensions (Amendment) Order 1997 (S.I. 1997/1291)
- M6 Birmingham to Carlisle Motorway (At Haighton) Connecting Roads Scheme 1997 (S.I. 1997/1292)
- M6 Birmingham To Carlisle Motorway (at Haighton) Special Roads Scheme 1997 Transfer Order 1997 (S.I. 1997/1293)

== 1301–1400 ==
- Finance Act 1997, Schedule 6, Paragraph 7, (Appointed Day) Order 1997 (S.I. 1997/1305)
- Southern Sea Fisheries District (Constitution of Committee and Expenses) (Variation) Order 1997 (S.I. 1997/1306)
- Building Societies Act 1997 (Commencement No. 1) Order 1997 (S.I. 1997/1307)
- Wiltshire Health Authority (Transfers of Trust Property) Order 1997 (S.I. 1997/1308)
- Companies Overseas Branch Registers (Hong Kong) Order 1997 (S.I. 1997/1313)
- Consular Fees Order 1997 (S.I. 1997/1314)
- Medical (Professional Performance) Act 1995 (Commencement No. 3) Order 1997 (S.I. 1997/1315)
- Criminal Justice Act 1988 (Designated Countries and Territories) (Amendment) Order 1997 (S.I. 1997/1316)
- Criminal Justice (International Co-operation) Act 1990 (Enforcement of Overseas Forfeiture Orders) (Amendment) Order 1997 (S.I. 1997/1317)
- Drug Trafficking Act 1994 (Designated Countries and Territories) (Amendment) Order 1997 (S.I. 1997/1318)
- European Convention on Cinematographic Co-production (Amendment) (No. 2) Order 1997 (S.I. 1997/1319)
- "Merchant Shipping (Safe Manning, Hours of Work and Watchkeeping) Regulations 1997 (S.I. 1997/1320 (See also S.I. 1997/1911))". opsi.gov.uk.
- Flood Prevention and Land Drainage (Scotland) Act 1997 (Commencement) Order 1997 (S.I. 1997/1322)
- Leicestershire Ambulance and Paramedic Service National Health Service Trust (Establishment) Amendment Order 1997 (S.I. 1997/1325)
- Gloucestershire Health Authority (Transfers of Trust Property) Order 1997 (S.I. 1997/1326)
- British Nationality (Fees) (Amendment) Regulations 1997 (S.I. 1997/1328)
- Stock Transfer (Gilt-Edged Securities) (CGO Service) (Amendment) Regulations 1997 (S.I. 1997/1329)
- A501 Trunk Road (Euston Road, Camden and Westminster) Red Route (Prescribed Route and Prohibited Turn) Traffic Order 1997 (S.I. 1997/1330)
- Surface Waters (Fishlife) (Classification) Regulations 1997 (S.I. 1997/1331)
- Surface Waters (Shellfish) (Classification) Regulations 1997 (S.I. 1997/1332)
- Listed Events (Prescribed Multiplier) Order 1997 (S.I. 1997/1333)
- Hong Kong Economic and Trade Office (Exemptions and Reliefs) Order 1997 (S.I. 1997/1334)
- Novel Foods and Novel Food Ingredients Regulations 1997 (S.I. 1997/1335)
- Novel Foods and Novel Food Ingredients (Fees) Regulations 1997 (S.I. 1997/1336)
- Home-Grown Cereals Authority (Rate of Levy) Order 1997 (S.I. 1997/1337)
- Road Vehicles (Construction and Use) (Amendment) (No. 3) Regulations 1997 (S.I. 1997/1340)
- Merchant Shipping (Mandatory Ships' Routeing) Regulations 1997 (S.I. 1997/1341)
- Road Traffic (Special Parking Area) (London Borough of Croydon) Order 1997 (S.I. 1997/1342)
- Medicines (Registered Homeopathic Veterinary Medicinal Products) (General Sale List) Order 1997 (S.I. 1997/1349)
- Medicines (Pharmacy and General Sale — Exemption) (Amendment) Order 1997 (S.I. 1997/1350)
- BBC World Service Transfer Scheme (Capital Allowances) Order 1997 (S.I. 1997/1354)
- Anglian Regional Flood Defence Committee Order 1997 (S.I. 1997/1359)
- Northumbria Regional Flood Defence Committee Order 1997 (S.I. 1997/1360)
- Severn-Trent Regional Flood Defence Committee Order 1997 (S.I. 1997/1361)
- Southern Regional Flood Defence Committee Order 1997 (S.I. 1997/1362)
- Thames Regional Flood Defence Committee Order 1997 (S.I. 1997/1363)
- Wessex Regional Flood Defence Committee Order 1997 (S.I. 1997/1364)
- Motor Vehicles (Type Approval for Goods Vehicles) (Great Britain) (Amendment) Regulations 1997 (S.I. 1997/1365)
- Motor Vehicles (Approval) (Amendment) Regulations 1997 (S.I. 1997/1366)
- Motor Vehicles (Type Approval) (Great Britain) (Amendment) Regulations 1997 (S.I. 1997/1367)
- Education (Individual Pupils' Achievements) (Information) Regulations 1997 (S.I. 1997/1368)
- Road Traffic (Special Parking Area) (City of Westminster) (Amendment) Order 1997 (S.I. 1997/1369)
- Social Security Act 1990 (Commencement No.6) Order 1997 (S.I. 1997/1370)
- Control of Trade in Endangered Species (Enforcement) Regulations 1997 (S.I. 1997/1372)
- Local Government Superannuation (Scotland) Amendment (No. 2) Regulations 1997 (S.I. 1997/1373)
- Solihull Healthcare National Health Service Trust (Transfer of Trust Property) Order 1997 (S.I. 1997/1375)
- Horizon National Health Service Trust (Establishment) Amendment Order 1997 (S.I. 1997/1376)
- Police Act 1997 (Commencement No. 1 and Transitional Provisions) Order 1997 (S.I. 1997/1377)
- Atomic Weapons Establishment Act 1991 Amendment Order 1997 (S.I. 1997/1396)
- Education (Funding for Teacher Training) Designation (No. 2) Order 1997 (S.I. 1997/1399)
- West Yorkshire Metropolitan Ambulance Service National Health Service Trust (Establishment) Amendment Order 1997 (S.I. 1997/1400)

== 1401–1500 ==
- Portsmouth Health Care National Health Service Trust (Transfer of Trust Property) Order 1997 (S.I. 1997/1401)
- Immigration (Exemption from Control) (Amendment) Order 1997 (S.I. 1997/1402)
- Northern Ireland (Emergency Provisions) Act 1996 (Amendment) Order 1997 (S.I. 1997/1403)
- Register of Occupational and Personal Pension Schemes (Amendment) Regulations 1997 (S.I. 1997/1405)
- Northern Ireland (Entry to Negotiations, etc.) Act 1996 (Revival of Section 3) Order 1997 (S.I. 1997/1410)
- Antarctic Act 1994 (Commencement) Order 1997 (SI 1997/1411)
- Miscellaneous Food Additives (Amendment) Regulations 1997 (S.I. 1997/1413)
- Eggs (Marketing Standards) (Amendment) Regulations 1997 (S.I. 1997/1414)
- Seeds (Fees) (Amendment) Regulations 1997 (S.I. 1997/1415)
- Protection from Harassment Act 1997 (Commencement) (No. 1) Order 1997 (S.I. 1997/1418)
- Local Government Act 1988 (Defined Activities) (Exemption) (Dacorum Borough Council) Order 1997 (S.I. 1997/1420)
- Control of Trade in Endangered Species (Fees) Regulations 1997 (S.I. 1997/1421)
- Building Societies Act 1997 (Commencement No. 2) Order 1997 (S.I. 1997/1427)
- Hydrographic Office Trading Fund (Variation) Order 1997 (S.I. 1997/1428)
- Police Pensions (Amendment) Regulations 1997 (S.I. 1997/1429)
- Transfer of Crofting Estates (Scotland) Act 1997 Commencement Order 1997 (S.I. 1997/1430)
- Distress for Customs and Excise Duties and Other Indirect Taxes Regulations 1997 (S.I. 1997/1431)
- Finance Act 1997, sections 52 and 53, (Appointed Day) Order 1997 (S.I. 1997/1432)
- Finance Act 1997 (Repeal of Distress and Diligence enactments) (Appointed Day) Order 1997 (S.I. 1997/1433)
- National Health Service Superannuation Scheme (Scotland) Amendment Regulations 1997 (S.I. 1997/1434)
- Local Government Superannuation (Scotland) Amendment (No. 3) Regulations 1997 (S.I. 1997/1435)
- Local Government Act 1988 (Competition) (Scotland) Amendment Regulations 1997 (S.I. 1997/1436)
- Fire Services (Appointments and Promotion) (Scotland) Amendment Regulations 1997 (S.I. 1997/1437)
- Local Government (Exemption from Competition) (Scotland) Amendment Order 1997 (S.I. 1997/1438)
- Local Government, Planning and Land Act 1980 (Competition) (Scotland) Amendment Regulations 1997 (S.I. 1997/1439)
- Environmentally Sensitive Areas (The Broads) Designation Order 1997 (S.I. 1997/1440)
- Environmentally Sensitive Areas (Pennine Dales) Designation Order 1997 (S.I. 1997/1441)
- Environmentally Sensitive Areas (Somerset Levels and Moors) Designation Order 1997 (S.I. 1997/1442)
- Environmentally Sensitive Areas (South Downs) Designation Order 1997 (S.I. 1997/1443)
- Environmentally Sensitive Areas (West Penwith) Designation Order 1997 (S.I. 1997/1444)
- Environmentally Sensitive Areas (Breckland) Designation (Amendment) Order 1997 (S.I. 1997/1445)
- Environmentally Sensitive Areas (Clun) Designation (Amendment) Order 1997 (S.I. 1997/1446)
- Environmentally Sensitive Areas (North Peak) Designation (Amendment) Order 1997 (S.I. 1997/1447)
- Environmentally Sensitive Areas (Suffolk River Valleys) Designation (Amendment) Order 1997 (S.I. 1997/1448)
- Environmentally Sensitive Areas (Test Valley) Designation (Amendment) Order 1997 (S.I. 1997/1449)
- Environmentally Sensitive Areas (Avon Valley) Designation (Amendment) Order 1997 (S.I. 1997/1450)
- Environmentally Sensitive Areas (Exmoor) Designation (Amendment) Order 1997 (S.I. 1997/1451)
- Environmentally Sensitive Areas (Lake District) Designation (Amendment) Order 1997 (S.I. 1997/1452)
- Environmentally Sensitive Areas (North Kent Marshes) Designation (Amendment) Order 1997 (S.I. 1997/1453)
- Environmentally Sensitive Areas (South Wessex Downs) Designation (Amendment) Order 1997 (S.I. 1997/1454)
- Environmentally Sensitive Areas (South West Peak) Designation (Amendment) Order 1997 (S.I. 1997/1455)
- Environmentally Sensitive Areas (England) Designation Orders (Revocation of Specified Provisions) Regulations 1997 (S.I. 1997/1456)
- Agriculture Act 1986 (Amendment) Regulations 1997 (S.I. 1997/1457)
- Road Vehicles (Construction and Use) (Amendment) (No. 4) Regulations 1997 (S.I. 1997/1458)
- Motor Vehicles (Approval) (Fees) Regulations 1997 (S.I. 1997/1459)
- Chemicals (Hazard Information and Packaging for Supply) (Amendment) Regulations 1997 (S.I. 1997/1460)
- Education Act 1997 (Commencement No. 2 and Transitional Provisions) Order 1997 (S.I. 1997/1468)
- Registration of Overseas Births and Deaths (Amendment) Regulations 1997 (S.I. 1997/1466)
- Medicines (Products for Animal Use — Fees) Regulations 1997 (S.I. 1997/1469)
- Lerwick Harbour Revision Order 1997 (S.I. 1997/1472)
- National Health Service (General Medical Services) (Scotland) Amendment (No. 2) Regulations 1997 (S.I. 1997/1473)
- Seed Potatoes (Amendment) Regulations 1997 (S.I. 1997/1474)
- Welfare of Animals (Transport) Order 1997 (S.I. 1997/1480)
- Food Protection (Emergency Prohibitions) (Oil and Chemical Pollution of Fish and Plants) (Partial Revocation No. 2) Order 1997 (S.I. 1997/1481)
- Leicestershire Ambulance and Paramedic Service National Health Service Trust (Establishment) Amendment (No. 2) Order 1997 (S.I. 1997/1482)
- Horizon National Health Service Trust (Establishment) Amendment (No. 2) Order 1997 (S.I. 1997/1483)
- Legal Aid in Criminal and Care Proceedings (Costs) (Amendment) (No. 3) Regulations 1997 (S.I. 1997/1484)
- Legal Aid in Criminal and Care Proceedings (General) (Amendment) (No. 2) Regulations 1997 (S.I. 1997/1485)
- Education (Individual Performance Information) (Identification of Individual Pupils) Regulations 1997 (S.I. 1997/1489)
- Protection from Harassment Act 1997 (Commencement) (No. 2) Order 1997 (S.I. 1997/1498)
- Contaminants in Food Regulations 1997 (S.I. 1997/1499)
- Solicitor General's Salary Order 1997 (S.I. 1997/1500)

== 1501–1600 ==
- Motor Vehicles (EC Type Approval) (Amendment) (No. 2) Regulations 1997 (S.I. 1997/1501)
- Motor Vehicles (Type Approval) (Great Britain) (Amendment) (No. 2) Regulations 1997 (S.I. 1997/1502)
- A312 Trunk Road (The Parkway, Hounslow) Red Route (Prescribed Route) Traffic Order 1997 (S.I. 1997/1503)
- Criminal Procedure and Investigations Act 1996 (Appointed Day No. 5) Order 1997 (S.I. 1997/1504)
- Road Works (Registers, Notices, Directions and Designations) (Scotland) Amendment Regulations 1997 (S.I. 1997/1505)
- A4 Trunk Road (Hillingdon and Hounslow) Red Route Traffic Order 1997 (S.I. 1997/1507)
- Merchant Shipping (Crew Accommodation) Regulations 1997 (S.I. 1997/1508)
- Merchant Shipping (Cargo Ship Construction) Regulations 1997 (S.I. 1997/1509)
- Merchant Shipping (Tonnage) Regulations 1997 (S.I. 1997/1510)
- Merchant Shipping (Official Log Books for Merchant Ships and Fishing Vessels) (Amendment) Regulations 1997 (S.I. 1997/1511)
- A406 Trunk Road (Barnet) Red Route (Clearway) Traffic Order 1996 Variation Order 1997 (S.I. 1997/1513)
- A41 Trunk Road (Camden) Red Route Experimental (No.2) Traffic Order 1997 Variation Order 1997 (S.I. 1997/1514)
- A406 Trunk Road (Hanger Lane, Ealing) Red Route (Prohibited Turns) Experimental Traffic Order 1997 (S.I. 1997/1515)
- Value Added Tax (Reverse Charge) (Anti-avoidance) Order 1997 (S.I. 1997/1523)
- Value Added Tax (Place of Supply of Services) (Amendment) Order 1997 (S.I. 1997/1524)
- Value Added Tax (Amendment) (No. 2) Regulations 1997 (S.I. 1997/1525)
- Act of Adjournal (Criminal Procedure Rules Amendment No.2) (Non-harassment order) 1997 (S.I. 1997/1526)
- Act of Sederunt (Rules of the Court of Session Amendment No.6 ) (Actions of harassment) 1997 (S.I. 1997/1527)
- Protection of Wrecks (Designation) Order 1997 (S.I. 1997/1528)
- General Medical Council (Professional Performance) Rules Order of Council 1997 (S.I. 1997/1529)
- Unichem Limited (Allotment of Shares) Revocation S.I. 1997/1530)
- Railways (Heathrow Express Temporary Network) (Exemptions) Order 1997 (S.I. 1997/1531)
- North Yorkshire (Coroners' Districts) Order 1997 (S.I. 1997/1532)
- Registration of Births and Deaths (Amendment No. 2) Regulations 1997 (S.I. 1997/1533)
- Land Registration (District Registries) Order 1997 (S.I. 1997/1534)
- Firearms (Amendment) Act 1997 (Commencement) (No. 2) Order 1997 (S.I. 1997/1535)
- Firearms (Amendment) Act 1997 (Commencement) (No. 2) (Amendment) Order 1997 (S.I. 1997/1536)
- Firearms (Amendment) Act 1997 (Firearms of Historic Interest) Order 1997 (S.I. 1997/1537)
- Firearms (Amendment) Act 1997 (Transitional Provisions and Savings) Regulations 1997 (S.I. 1997/1538)
- Merchant Shipping and Maritime Security Act 1997 (Commencement No. 2) Order 1997 (S.I. 1997/1539)
- Fertilisers (Amendment) Regulations 1997 (S.I. 1997/1543)
- Road Vehicles (Construction and Use) (Amendment) (No. 5) Regulations 1997 (S.I. 1997/1544)
- A21 Trunk Road (Morleys Interchange Slip Roads) (Trunking) Order 1997 (S.I. 1997/1545)
- Food Protection (Emergency Prohibitions) (Paralytic Shellfish Poisoning) Order 1997 (S.I. 1997/1565)
- Hong Kong (Colonial Probates Act) Order 1997 (S.I. 1997/1572)
- Potato Marketing Board (Residuary Functions) Regulations 1997 (S.I. 1997/1573)
- Public Lending Right Scheme 1982 (Commencement of Variations) Order 1997 (S.I. 1997/1576)
- Social Security Administration (Fraud) Act 1997 (Commencement No. 1) Order 1997 (S.I. 1997/1577)
- Bermuda (Territorial Sea) (Amendment) Order 1997 (S.I. 1997/1578)
- Transfer of Prisoners (Isle of Man) – Order 1997 (S.I. 1997/1579)
- Road Traffic Act 1991 (Commencement No.13) (Scotland) Order 1997 (S.I. 1997/1580)
- Crime (Sentences) Act 1997 (Commencement) (No. 1) Order 1997 (S.I. 1997/1581)
- Water (Prevention of Pollution) (Code of Practice) (Scotland) Order 1997 (S.I. 1997/1584)
- Police Act 1997 (Provisions in relation to the NCIS Service Authority) (No. 1) Order 1997 (S.I. 1997/1585)
- British Coal Corporation (Change of Quorum) Regulations 1997 (S.I. 1997/1588)

== 1601–1700 ==
- Finance Act 1997, Section 110, (Appointed Day) Order 1997 (S.I. 1997/1603)
- Horserace Betting Levy (Bookmakers' Committee) Regulations 1997 (S.I. 1997/1604)
- A41 Trunk Road (Camden) Red Route Experimental (No. 2) Traffic Order 1997 Variation (No. 2) Order 1997 (S.I. 1997/1607)
- A406 Trunk Road (Barnet) Red Route Traffic Order 1997 (S.I. 1997/1608)
- International Monetary Fund (Limit on Lending) Order 1997 (S.I. 1997/1611)
- Local Government Pension Scheme Regulations 1997 (S.I. 1997/1612)
- Local Government Pension Scheme (Transitional Provisions) Regulations 1997 (S.I. 1997/1613)
- Value Added Tax (Amendment) (No.3) Regulations 1997 (S.I. 1997/1614)
- Value Added Tax (Cars) (Amendment) Order 1997 (S.I. 1997/1615)
- Value Added Tax (Special Provisions) (Amendment) Order 1997 (S.I. 1997/1616)
- Avon Health Authority (Transfers of Trust Property) Order 1997 (S.I. 1997/1618)
- North and East Devon Health Authority (Transfer of Trust Property) Order 1997 (S.I. 1997/1619)
- Worcestershire Community Healthcare National Health Service Trust (Transfer of Trust Property) Order 1997 (S.I. 1997/1620)
- Housing (Change of Landlord) (Payment of Disposal Cost by Instalments) (Amendment) (No. 2) Regulations 1997 (S.I. 1997/1621)
- Education Act 1996 (Commencement No. 2 and Appointed Day) Order 1997 (S.I. 1997/1623)
- Energy Information (Combined Washer-driers) Regulations 1997 (S.I. 1997/1624)
- Education (Disability Statements for Local Education Authorities) (England) Regulations 1997 (S.I. 1997/1625)
- Environment Act 1995 (Commencement No. 9 and Transitional Provisions) Order 1997 (S.I. 1997/1626)
- Insurance Premium Tax (Taxable Insurance Contracts) Order 1997 (S.I. 1997/1627)
- Value Added Tax (Increase of Registration Limits) Order 1997 (S.I. 1997/1628)
- Third Country Fishing (Enforcement) (Amendment) Order 1997 (S.I. 1997/1629)
- Fishing Boats (Specified Countries) Designation (Variation) Order 1997 (S.I. 1997/1630)
- Local Authorities Etc. (Allowances) (Scotland) Amendment Regulations 1997 (S.I. 1997/1631)
- A12 Trunk Road (Redbridge) Red Route Traffic Order 1996 Variation Order 1997 (S.I. 1997/1632)
- Education (School Performance Information) (Wales) Regulations 1997 (S.I. 1997/1633)
- Grants for School Education (Early Intervention and Alternatives to Exclusion) (Scotland) Regulations 1997 (S.I. 1997/1638)
- Royal Parks and Other Open Spaces Regulations 1997 (S.I. 1997/1639)
- St Mary's Music School (Aided Places) Amendment Regulations 1997 (S.I. 1997/1640)
- Education (Assisted Places) (Scotland) Amendment Regulations 1997 (S.I. 1997/1641)
- Contracting Out (Functions in relation to the provision of Guardians Ad Litem and Reporting Officers Panels) Order 1997 (S.I. 1997/1652)
- Civil Aviation (Route Charges for Navigation Services) (Third Amendment) Regulations 1997 (S.I. 1997/1653)
- Recreation Grounds (Revocation of Parish Council Byelaws) Order 1997 (S.I. 1997/1654)
- Offshore Installations (Safety Zones) (No. 3) Order 1997 (S.I. 1997/1655)
- Guardians Ad Litem and Reporting Officers (Panels) (Amendment) Regulations 1997 (S.I. 1997/1662)
- Local Government Act 1988 (Defined Activities) (Exemption) (Craven, Kerrier and Mid-Devon District Councils and Middlesbrough Borough Council) Order 1997 (S.I. 1997/1666)
- Social Security (Miscellaneous Amendments) (No. 3) Regulations 1997 (S.I. 1997/1671)
- Architects Act 1997 (Commencement) Order 1997 (S.I. 1997/1672)
- International Carriage of Perishable Foodstuffs (Amendment) Regulations 1997 (S.I. 1997/1673)
- Merchant Shipping (Compensation to Seamen — War Damage to Effects) (Revocation) Scheme 1997 (S.I. 1997/1674)
- Education (Student Loans) Regulations 1997 (S.I. 1997/1675)
- Safety of Sports Grounds (Designation) Order 1997 (S.I. 1997/1676)
- Football Spectators (Seating) Order 1997 (S.I. 1997/1677)
- National Health Service (Fund-holding Practices) Amendment (No. 2) Regulations 1997 (S.I. 1997/1678)
- Motor Vehicles (Tests) (Amendment) (No.2) Regulations 1997 (S.I. 1997/1679)
- Registration of Births, Deaths, Marriages and Divorces (Fees) (Scotland) Amendment Regulations 1997 (S.I. 1997/1680)
- Taxes (Interest Rate) (Amendment) Regulations 1997 (S.I. 1997/1681)
- Satellite Television Service Regulations 1997 (S.I. 1997/1682)
- Judicial Pensions (Miscellaneous) (Amendment) Regulations 1997 (S.I. 1997/1687)
- Golden Valley Railway Order 1997 (S.I. 1997/1688)
- Northern Ireland Act 1974 (Interim Period Extension) Order 1997 (S.I. 1997/1690)
- Pneumoconiosis etc. (Workers' Compensation) (Payment of Claims) Amendment Regulations 1997 (S.I. 1997/1691)
- Firearms (Museums) Order 1997 (S.I. 1997/1692)
- Education (Mandatory Awards) (Amendment) Regulations 1997 (S.I. 1997/1693)
- Dual-Use and Related Goods (Export Control) (Amendment No. 3) Regulations 1997 (S.I. 1997/1694)
- Noise Act 1996 (Commencement No. 2) Order 1997 (S.I. 1997/1695)
- Police Act 1997 (Commencement No. 2) Order 1997 (S.I. 1997/1696)
- Local Authorities (Direct Labour Organisations) (Competition) (Wales) (Amendment) Regulations 1997 (S.I. 1997/1697)
- Local Government Act 1988 (Defined Activities) (Exemptions) (Wales) (Amendment) Order 1997 (S.I. 1997/1698)
- Local Government Act 1988 (Competition) (Wales) Regulations 1997 (S.I. 1997/1699)
- Local Government Act 1988 (Defined Activities) (Works Contracts) (Exemptions) (Wales) Order 1997 (S.I. 1997/1700)

== 1701–1800 ==
- Local Government Act 1988 (Defined Activities) (Housing Management) (Exemptions) (Wales) (Amendment) Order 1997 (S.I. 1997/1701)
- Local Government Act 1988 (Direct Service Organisations) (Accounts etc.) (Extension) (Wales) (Amendment) Order 1997 (S.I. 1997/1702)
- Government Stock (Amendment) Regulations 1997 (S.I. 1997/1709)
- Land Registration Fees (No. 2) Order 1997 (S.I. 1997/1710)
- Charities (The Peabody Donation Fund) Order 1997 (S.I. 1997/1711)
- Crime and Punishment (Scotland) Act 1997 (Commencement and Transitional Provisions) Order 1997 (S.I. 1997/1712)
- Confined Spaces Regulations 1997 (S.I. 1997/1713)
- Betting and Gaming Duties Act 1981 (Bingo Prize Limit) Order 1997 (S.I. 1997/1714)
- Open-ended Investment Companies (Tax) (Amendment) Regulations 1997 (S.I. 1997/1715)
- Personal Equity Plan (Amendment No. 2) Regulations 1997 (S.I. 1997/1716)
- Protection of Wrecks (Designation No. 2) Order 1997 (S.I. 1997/1717)
- Protection of Wrecks (Designation No. 3) Order 1997 (S.I. 1997/1718)
- Return of Cultural Objects (Amendment) Regulations 1997 (S.I. 1997/1719)
- Act of Sederunt (Rules of the Court of Session Amendment No. 7) (Judicial Factors) 1997 (S.I. 1997/1720)
- Liquor Licensing (Fees) (Scotland) Order 1997 (S.I. 1997/1721)
- Nurses, Midwives and Health Visitors (Supervisors of Midwives) Amendment Rules Approval Order 1997 (S.I. 1997/1723)
- James Paget Hospital National Health Service Trust (Change of Name) Order 1997 (S.I. 1997/1724)
- Confiscation of Alcohol (Young Persons) Act 1997 (Commencement) Order 1997 (S.I. 1997/1725)
- Council Tax Limitation (England) (Maximum Amounts) Order 1997 (S.I. 1997/1726)
- Medicines (Stilbenes and Thyrostatic Substances Prohibition) (Revocation) Order 1997 (S.I. 1997/1727)
- Medicines (Control of Substances for Manufacture) (Revocation) Order 1997 (S.I. 1997/1728)
- Animals and Animal Products (Examination for Residues and Maximum Residue Limits) Regulations 1997 (S.I. 1997/1729)
- Legal Advice and Assistance (Scope) (Amendment) (No. 2) Regulations 1997 (S.I. 1997/1731)
- Contracting Out (Metropolitan Police and Civil Staffs Pensions) Order 1997 (S.I. 1997/1736)
- London Docklands Development Corporation (Alteration of Boundaries) Order 1997 (S.I. 1997/1738)
- Food Protection (Emergency Prohibitions) (Paralytic Shellfish Poisoning) Order 1997 Partial Revocation Order 1997 (S.I. 1997/1739)
- Supply of Beer (Tied Estate) (Amendment) Order 1997 (S.I. 1997/1740)
- Homelessness (Suitability of Accommodation) (Amendment) Order 1997 (S.I. 1997/1741)
- European Communities (Designation) (No. 2) Order 1997 (S.I. 1997/1742)
- European Convention on Cinematographic Co-production (Amendment) (No. 3) Order 1997 (S.I. 1997/1743)
- Secretary of State for Culture, Media and Sport Order 1997 (S.I. 1997/1744)
- Army, Air Force and Naval Discipline Acts (Continuation) Order 1997 (S.I. 1997/1745)
- Air Navigation (Overseas Territories) (Amendment) Order 1997 (S.I. 1997/1746)
- Child Abduction and Custody (Parties to Conventions) (Amendment) Order 1997 (S.I. 1997/1747)
- Environment Protection (Overseas Territories) (Amendment) Order 1997 (S.I. 1997/1748)
- Transfer of Functions (International Development) Order 1997 (S.I. 1997/1749)
- Fishery Limits Order 1997 (S.I. 1997/1750)
- United Nations (International Tribunal) (Rwanda) (Amendment) Order 1997 (S.I. 1997/1751)
- United Nations (International Tribunal) (Former Yugoslavia) (Amendment) Order 1997 (S.I. 1997/1752)
- United Nations (International Tribunals) (Former Yugoslavia and Rwanda) (Dependent Territories) Order 1997 (S.I. 1997/1753)
- Appropriation (No. 2) (Northern Ireland) Order 1997 (S.I. 1997/1754)
- Broadcasting Act 1996 (British Broadcasting Corporation — Transmission Network) (Guernsey) Order 1997 (S.I. 1997/1755)
- Broadcasting Act 1996 (British Broadcasting Corporation — Transmission Network) (Isle of Man) Order 1997 (S.I. 1997/1756)
- Broadcasting Act 1996 (British Broadcasting Corporation-Transmission Network) (Jersey) Order 1997 (S.I. 1997/1757)
- Commissioner for Complaints (Amendment) (Northern Ireland) Order 1997 (S.I. 1997/1758)
- European Convention on Extradition Order 1990 (Amendment) Order 1997 (S.I. 1997/1759)
- Extradition (Aviation Security) Order 1997 (S.I. 1997/1760)
- Extradition (Designated Commonwealth Countries) Order 1991 (Amendment) Order 1997 (S.I. 1997/1761)
- Extradition (Drug Trafficking) Order 1997 (S.I. 1997/1762)
- Extradition (Hijacking) Order 1997 (S.I. 1997/1763)
- Extradition (Internationally Protected Persons) Order 1997 (S.I. 1997/1764)
- Extradition (Protection of Nuclear Material) Order 1997 (S.I. 1997/1765)
- Extradition (Safety of Maritime Navigation) Order 1997 (S.I. 1997/1766)
- Extradition (Taking of Hostages) Order 1997 (S.I. 1997/1767)
- Extradition (Tokyo Convention) Order 1997 S.I. 1997/1768)
- Extradition (Torture) Order 1997 (S.I. 1997/1769)
- Food and Environment Protection Act 1985 (Guernsey) (Amendment) Order 1997 (S.I. 1997/1770)
- Food and Environment Protection Act 1985 (Jersey) (Amendment) Order 1997 (S.I. 1997/1771)
- Further Education (Northern Ireland) Order 1997 (S.I. 1997/1772)
- Merchant Shipping (Salvage Convention) (Jersey) Order 1997 (S.I. 1997/1773)
- Police (Health and Safety) (Northern Ireland) Order 1997 (S.I. 1997/1774)
- Transfer of Prisoners (Isle of Man) (No. 2) Order 1997 (S.I. 1997/1775)
- Transfer of Prisoners (Restricted Transfers) (Channel Islands and Isle of Man) Order 1997 (S.I. 1997/1776)
- Double Taxation Relief (Taxes on Income) (Argentina) Order 1997 (S.I. 1997/1777)
- Social Security (United States of America) Order 1997 (S.I. 1997/1778)
- Visiting Forces (Designation) Order 1997 (S.I. 1997/1779)
- National Health Service (Primary Care) Act 1997 (Commencement No. 1) Order 1997 (S.I. 1997/1780)
- Valuation Timetable (Scotland) Amendment Order 1997 (S.I. 1997/1781)
- Registration of Births, Still-Births and Deaths (Prescription of Errors) (Scotland) Regulations 1997 (S.I. 1997/1782)
- Lotteries (Gaming Board Fees) Order 1997 (S.I. 1997/1783)
- Sports Grounds and Sporting Events (Designation) (Scotland) Amendment Order 1997 (S.I. 1997/1787)
- Act of Adjournal (Criminal Procedure Rules Amendment No. 3) 1997 (S.I. 1997/1788)
- Education (School Teachers' Pay and Conditions) (No. 2) Order 1997 (S.I. 1997/1789)
- Social Security (Lone Parents) (Amendment) Regulations 1997 (S.I. 1997/1790)
- Birmingham Health Authority (Transfers of Trust Property) Order 1997 (S.I. 1997/1791)

== 1801–1900 ==
- Oil Pollution (Compulsory Insurance) Regulations 1997 (S.I. 1997/1820)
- National Health Service (Pilot Schemes: Financial Assistance for Preparatory Work) Regulations 1997 (S.I. 1997/1821)
- A316 Trunk Road (Richmond) Red Route Traffic Order 1997 (S.I. 1997/1824)
- Countryside Stewardship (Amendment)Regulations 1997 (S.I. 1997/1827)
- Gaming Act (Variation of Monetary Limits) Order 1997 (S.I. 1997/1828)
- Firemen's Pensions (Provision of Information) Regulations 1997 (S.I. 1997/1829)
- Prescription Only Medicines (Human Use) Order 1997 (S.I. 1997/1830)
- Medicines (Sale or Supply) (Miscellaneous Provisions) Amendment Regulations 1997 (S.I. 1997/1831)
- Education (School Information) (Wales) Regulations 1997 (S.I. 1997/1832)
- Education (School Inspection) (Wales) (No. 2) (Amendment) Regulations 1997 (S.I. 1997/1833)
- Act of Adjournal (Criminal Procedure Rules Amendment No. 4) 1997 (S.I. 1997/1834)
- Local Authorities (Goods and Services) (Public Bodies) (English Heritage) Order 1997 (S.I. 1997/1835)
- Value Added Tax (Terminal Markets) (Amendment) Order 1997 (S.I. 1997/1836)
- County Court (Amendment) Rules 1997 (S.I. 1997/1837)
- County Court (Forms) (Amendment) Rules 1997 (S.I. 1997/1838)
- Social Security (Attendance Allowance and Disability Living Allowance) (Miscellaneous Amendments) Regulations 1997 (S.I. 1997/1839)
- Fire Precautions (Workplace) Regulations 1997 S.I. 1997/1840)
- Council Tax Benefit (General) Amendment Regulations 1997 (S.I. 1997/1841)
- "Wireless Telegraphy (Control of Interference from Videosenders) Order 1997 (S.I. 1997/1842 (This SI has been amended by S.I. 1998/722))". opsi.gov.uk.
- West Mercia (Police Area and Authority) Order 1997 (S.I. 1997/1844)
- Cheshire (Police Area and Authority) Order 1997 (S.I. 1997/1845)
- Cambridgeshire (Police Area and Authority) Order 1997 (S.I. 1997/1846)
- Essex (Police Area and Authority) Order 1997 (S.I. 1997/1847)
- Thames Valley (Police Authority) Order 1997 (S.I. 1997/1848)
- Devon and Cornwall (Police Area and Authority) Order 1997 (S.I. 1997/1849)
- Nottinghamshire (Police Area and Authority) Order 1997 (S.I. 1997/1850)
- Housing Act 1996 (Commencement No. 11 and Savings) Order 1997 (S.I. 1997/1851)
- Leasehold Valuation Tribunals (Fees) Order 1997 (S.I. 1997/1852)
- Leasehold Valuation Tribunals (Service Charges, Insurance or Appointment of Managers Applications) Order 1997 (S.I. 1997/1853)
- Rent Assessment Committee (England and Wales) (Leasehold Valuation Tribunal) (Amendment) Regulations 1997 (S.I. 1997/1854)
- Lancashire (Police Area and Authority) Order 1997 (S.I. 1997/1855)
- Broadcasting (Technical Services) Order 1997 (S.I. 1997/1856)
- Kent (Police Area and Authority) Order 1997 (S.I. 1997/1857)
- Savings Contracts (Amendment) Regulations 1997 (S.I. 1997/1858)
- Savings Certificates (Amendment) Regulations 1997 (S.I. 1997/1859)
- Savings Certificates (Children's Bonus Bonds) (Amendment) Regulations 1997 (S.I. 1997/1860)
- General Medical Council (Legal Assessors) (Amendment) Rules 1997 (S.I. 1997/1861)
- Premium Savings Bonds (Amendment) Regulations 1997 (S.I. 1997/1862)
- Savings Certificates (Yearly Plan) (Amendment) Regulations 1997 (S.I. 1997/1863)
- National Savings Stock Register (Amendment) Regulations 1997 (S.I. 1997/1864)
- Banking Act 1987 (Exempt Transactions) (Amendment) Regulations 1997 (S.I. 1997/1866)
- Merchant Shipping (Prevention of Pollution: Substances Other than Oil) (Intervention) Order 1997 (S.I. 1997/1869)
- Environmental Assessment (Scotland) Amendment Regulations 1997 (S.I. 1997/1870)
- Town and Country Planning (General Permitted Development) (Scotland) Amendment Order 1997 (S.I. 1997/1871)
- Building Standards (Relaxation by Local Authorities) (Scotland) Regulations 1997 (S.I. 1997/1872)
- Corn Returns Regulations 1997 (S.I. 1997/1873)
- Fish Health Regulations 1997 (S.I. 1997/1881)
- General Medical Council (Registration (Fees) (Amendment) Regulations) Order of Council 1997 (S.I. 1997/1884)
- Wireless Telegraphy (Licence Charges) (Amendment No. 2) Regulations 1997 (S.I. 1997/1885)
- Telecommunications (Voice Telephony) Regulations 1997 (S.I. 1997/1886)
- Trading Schemes (Exclusion) (Amendment) Regulations 1997 (S.I. 1997/1887)
- National Health Service Pension Scheme (Amendment) Regulations 1997 (S.I. 1997/1888)
- Ecclesiastical Judges and Legal Officers(Fees) Order 1997 (S.I. 1997/1889)
- Legal Officers (Annual Fees) Order 1997 (S.I. 1997/1890)
- Parochial Fees Order 1997 (S.I. 1997/1891)
- Family Law Act 1996 (Commencement No. 2) Order 1997 (S.I. 1997/1892)
- Family Proceedings (Amendment No. 3) Rules 1997 (S.I. 1997/1893)
- Family Proceedings Courts (Matrimonial Proceedings etc.) (Amendment) Rules 1997 (S.I. 1997/1894)
- Family Proceedings Courts (Children Act 1989) (Amendment) Rules 1997 (S.I. 1997/1895)
- Family Law Act 1996 (Part IV) (Allocation of Proceedings) Order 1997 (S.I. 1997/1896)
- Children (Allocation of Proceedings) (Amendment) Order 1997 (S.I. 1997/1897)
- Family Law Act 1996 (Modifications of Enactments) Order 1997 (S.I. 1997/1898)
- Family Proceedings Fees (Amendment) (No. 3) Order 1997 (S.I. 1997/1899)
- Genetically Modified Organisms (Deliberate Release and Risk Assessment-Amendment) Regulations 1997 (S.I. 1997/1900)

== 1901–2000 ==
- Cattle Identification (Enforcement) Regulations 1997 (S.I. 1997/1901)
- Allocation of Housing (Reasonable and Additional Preference) Regulations 1997 (S.I. 1997/1902)
- Housing (Prescribed Forms) (Amendment) (No. 2) Regulations 1997 (S.I. 1997/1903)
- Building Regulations (Amendment) Regulations 1997 (S.I. 1997/1904)
- Bovines and Bovine Products (Despatch Prohibition and Production Restriction) Regulations 1997 (S.I. 1997/1905)
- Knives Act 1997 (Commencement) (No. 1) Order 1997 (S.I. 1997/1906)
- Knives (Forfeited Property) Regulations 1997 (S.I. 1997/1907)
- Police (Property) Regulations 1997 (S.I. 1997/1908)
- Jobseeker's Allowance (Workskill Courses) Pilot (No. 2) Regulations 1997 (S.I. 1997/1909)
- Merchant Shipping (Prevention of Oil Pollution) (Amendment) Regulations 1997 (S.I. 1997/1910)
- Merchant Shipping (Training, Certification and Safe Manning) (Amendment) Regulations 1997 (S.I. 1997/1911)
- Police Pensions (Provision of Information) Regulations 1997 (S.I. 1997/1912)
- Local Government Act 1988 (Defined Activities) (Exemption) (Hackney and Southwark London Borough Councils and Liverpool City Council) Order 1997 (S.I. 1997/1913)
- Dartford-Thurrock Crossing Tolls Order 1997 (S.I. 1997/1914)
- Dartford-Thurrock Crossing (Amendment) Regulations 1997 (S.I. 1997/1915)
- National Health Service Superannuation Scheme (Scotland) Amendment (No.2) Regulations 1997 (S.I. 1997/1916)
- Sex Offenders Act 1997 (Commencement) Order 1997 (S.I. 1997/1920)
- Sex Offenders (Certificate of Caution) Order 1997 (S.I. 1997/1921)
- Fishing Vessels (Decommissioning) Scheme 1997 (S.I. 1997/1924)
- Church of England Pensions Regulations 1997 (S.I. 1997/1929)
- Police Act 1997 (Commencement No. 3 and Transitional Provisions) Order 1997 (S.I. 1997/1930)
- Education (National Curriculum) (Assessment Arrangements for the Core Subjects) (Key Stage 1) (England) (Amendment) Order 1997 (S.I. 1997/1931)
- Partnerships (Unrestricted Size) No. 12 Regulations 1997 (S.I. 1997/1937)
- Electronic Fingerprinting etc. Device Approval (Scotland) Order 1997 (S.I. 1997/1939)
- Local Government Act 1988 (Defined Activities) (Exemption) (Christchurch Borough Council) Order 1997 (S.I. 1997/1940)
- Energy Efficiency (Refrigerators and Freezers) Regulations 1997 (S.I. 1997/1941)
- Sea Fishing (Enforcement of Community Conservation Measures) Order 1997 (S.I. 1997/1949)
- Transport and Works (Guided Transport Modes) (Amendment) Order 1997 (S.I. 1997/1951)
- Inverness Harbour Revision Order 1997 (S.I. 1997/1952)
- Cromarty Firth Port Authority Harbour Revision Order 1997 (S.I. 1997/1953)
- Nursery Education (Amendment) Regulations 1997 (S.I. 1997/1954)
- Finance Act 1997, section 7(10), (Appointed Day) Order 1997 (S.I. 1997/1960)
- Plant Passport (Plant Health Fees) (England and Wales) (Amendment) Regulations 1997 (S.I. 1997/1961)
- Agricultural Holdings (Units of Production) Order 1997 (S.I. 1997/1962)
- National Board for Nursing, Midwifery and Health Visiting for England (Constitution and Administration) Amendment Order 1997 (S.I. 1997/1963)
- Land Registration (Matrimonial Home Rights) Rules 1997 (S.I. 1997/1964)
- Lands Tribunal (Amendment) Rules 1997 (S.I. 1997/1965)
- Education (School Inspection) Regulations 1997 (S.I. 1997/1966)
- Education (Grants) (Music, Ballet and Choir Schools) (Amendment) Regulations 1997 (S.I. 1997/1967)
- Education (Assisted Places) Regulations 1997 (S.I. 1997/1968)
- Education (Assisted Places) (Incidental Expenses) Regulations 1997 (S.I. 1997/1969)
- Education (School Leaving Date) Order 1997 (S.I. 1997/1970)
- Education (Fees and Awards) Regulations 1997 (S.I. 1997/1972)
- Housing Benefit (General) Amendment (No. 2) Regulations 1997 (S.I. 1997/1974)
- Housing Benefit (General) Amendment (No. 3) Regulations 1997 (S.I. 1997/1975)
- Protection of Wrecks (SS Castilian) Order 1997 (S.I. 1997/1976)
- Treasure Act 1996 (Commencement No. 2) Order 1997 (S.I. 1997/1977)
- Food Protection (Emergency Prohibitions) (Paralytic Shellfish Poisoning) Order 1997 Revocation Order 1997 (S.I. 1997/1978)
- Accounts Commission for Scotland (Financial Year) Order 1997 (S.I. 1997/1979)
- Local Authority Accounts (Scotland) Amendment Regulations 1997 (S.I. 1997/1980)
- Local Government (Publication of Performance Information) (Scotland) Order 1997 (S.I. 1997/1981)
- Rent Officers (Housing Benefit Functions) Order 1997 (S.I. 1997/1984)
- Legal Aid in Criminal and Care Proceedings (General) (Amendment) (No. 3) Regulations 1997 (S.I. 1997/1985)
- Veal (Marketing Payment) Regulations 1997 (S.I. 1997/1986)
- Anglian Harbours National Health Service Trust Dissolution Order 1997 (S.I. 1997/1987)
- A180 Trunk Road (A180/A1136 Junction Improvement Slip Roads) Order 1997 (S.I. 1997/1988)
- Education (London Residuary Body) (Suspense Account Properties) Order 1997 (S.I. 1997/1990)
- European Bank for Reconstruction and Development (Further Payments to Capital Stock) Order 1997 (S.I. 1997/1991)
- Local Government Changes for England (Lord-Lieutenants and Sheriffs) Order 1997 (S.I. 1997/1992)
- Offshore Electricity and Noise Regulations 1997 (S.I. 1997/1993)
- Rent Officers (Housing Benefit Functions) (Scotland) Order 1997 (S.I. 1997/1995)
- Wireless Telegraphy (Short Range Devices) (Exemption) (Amendment) Regulations 1997 (S.I. 1997/1996)

== 2001–2100 ==
- Housing (Change of Landlord) (Payment of Disposal Cost by Instalments) (Amendment) (No. 3) Regulations 1997 (S.I. 1997/2001)
- A501 Trunk Road (Camden, Islington and Westminster) Red Route Traffic Order 1997 (S.I. 1997/2002)
- A406 Trunk Road (North Circular Road, Ealing) Red Route (Prescribed Routes and Turns) Traffic Order 1997 (S.I. 1997/2003)
- Nursery Education (Amendment) (No. 2) Regulations 1997 (S.I. 1997/2006)
- Prisons and Young Offenders Institutions (Scotland) Amendment Rules 1997 (S.I. 1997/2007)
- Education (Fees and Awards) (Scotland) Amendment Regulations 1997 (S.I. 1997/2008)
- Education (National Curriculum) (Assessment Arrangements for English, Welsh, Mathematics and Science) (Key Stage 2) (Wales) Order 1997 (S.I. 1997/2009)
- Education (National Curriculum) (Key Stage 3 Assessment Arrangements) (Wales) Order 1997 (S.I. 1997/2010)
- Education (National Curriculum) (Assessment Arrangements for English, Welsh, Mathematics and Science) (Key Stage 1) (Wales) Order 1997 (S.I. 1997/2011)
- A205 Trunk Road (Lewisham) Red Route (Cycle Lane) Experimental Traffic Order 1997 (S.I. 1997/2012)
- A406 Trunk Road (North Circular Road, Ealing) Red Route (Prescribed Turns) Traffic Order 1997 (S.I. 1997/2013)
- A205 Trunk Road (Lewisham) Red Route Experimental Traffic Order 1997 (S.I. 1997/2014)
- London North Circular Trunk Road (A406) (East of Finchley High Road, Barnet) (Prohibition Of Use Of Gap In Central Reserve) Order 1997 (S.I. 1997/2023)
- Stonehenge Regulations 1997 (S.I. 1997/2038)
- Lambeth Healthcare National Health Service Trust (Transfer of Trust Property) Order 1997 (S.I. 1997/2041)
- Processed Cereal-based Foods and Baby Foods for Infants and Young Children Regulations 1997 (S.I. 1997/2042)
- Medicines (Products Other Than Veterinary Drugs) (General Sale List) Amendment Order 1997 (S.I. 1997/2043)
- Prescription Only Medicines (Human Use) Amendment Order 1997 (S.I. 1997/2044)
- Medicines (Sale or Supply) (Miscellaneous Provisions) Amendment (No. 2) Regulations 1997 (S.I. 1997/2045)
- Allocation of Housing and Homelessness (Amendment) (No. 2) Regulations 1997 (S.I. 1997/2046)
- Income Support (General) (Standard Interest Rate Amendment) (No. 2) Regulations 1997 (S.I. 1997/2055)
- Social Security Administration (Fraud) Act 1997 (Commencement No. 2) Order 1997 (S.I. 1997/2056)
- Local Government (Compensation for Redundancy) (Amendment) Regulations 1997 (S.I. 1997/2059)
- Education (School Performance Information) (England) (Amendment) Regulations 1997 (S.I. 1997/2060)
- Criminal Law (Consolidation) (Scotland) Act 1995 (Detention by Customs Officers) (Specification of Titles) Order 1997 (S.I. 1997/2062)
- Motor Vehicles (Driving Licences) (Amendment) (No. 4) Regulations 1997 (S.I. 1997/2070)
- Animal By-Products (Identification) (Amendment) Regulations 1997 (S.I. 1997/2073)
- Fresh Meat (Hygiene and Inspection) (Amendment) Regulations 1997 (S.I. 1997/2074)
- Road Traffic (Permitted Parking Area and Special Parking Area ) (County of Kent) (Borough of Maidstone) Order 1997 (S.I. 1997/2078)
- Gaming Act (Variation of Monetary Limits) (No. 2) Order 1997 (S.I. 1997/2079)
- Amusements with Prizes (Variation of Monetary Limits) Order 1997 (S.I. 1997/2080)
- Act of Adjournal (Criminal Procedure Rules Amendment No. 6) 1997 (S.I. 1997/2081)
- Act of Adjournal (Criminal Procedure Rules Amendment No. 5) 1997 (S.I. 1997/2082)
- Social Security (Recovery of Benefits) Act 1997 (Commencement) Order 1997 (S.I. 1997/2085)
- Scottish Seed Potato Development Council (Dissolution) Order 1997 (S.I. 1997/2092)
- Local Authorities (Goods and Services) (Public Bodies) (No. 2) Order 1997 (S.I. 1997/2095)

== 2101–2200 ==
- Northern Ireland Arms Decommissioning Act 1997 (Commencement of Section 7) Order 1997 (S.I. 1997/2111)
- A41 Trunk Road (Camden) (Temporary Prohibition of Traffic) Order 1997 (S.I. 1997/2132)
- A23 Trunk Road (Croydon) Red Route (No. 2) Experimental Traffic Order 1997 (S.I. 1997/2133)
- A23 Trunk Road (Croydon) Red Route (Prohibited Turns) (No. 2) Experimental Traffic Order 1997 (S.I. 1997/2134)
- Wireless Telegraphy (Network User Stations) (Exemption) Regulations 1997 (S.I. 1997/2137)
- Education (Qualifications, Curriculum and Assessment Authority for Wales) (Conferment of Functions) Order 1997 (S.I. 1997/2140)
- Building (Scotland) Amendment Regulations 1997 (S.I. 1997/2157)
- Race Relations (Complaints to Industrial Tribunals) (Armed Forces) Regulations 1997 (S.I. 1997/2161)
- Equal Pay (Complaints to Industrial Tribunals) (Armed Forces) Regulations 1997 (S.I. 1997/2162)
- Sex Discrimination (Complaints to Industrial Tribunals) (Armed Forces) Regulations 1997 (S.I. 1997/2163)
- Armed Forces Act 1996 (Commencement No. 3 and Transitional Provisions) Order 1997 (S.I. 1997/2164)
- Local Government Changes for England (Direct Labour Organisations) (East Riding of Yorkshire District Council) Order 1997 (S.I. 1997/2169)
- County Court (Forms) (Amendment No. 2) Rules 1997 (S.I. 1997/2171)
- Education (Qualifications and Curriculum Authority and Qualifications, Curriculum and Assessment Authority for Wales) (Transfer of Property and Designation of Staff) Order 1997 (S.I. 1997/2172)
- Education (Further Education Institutions Information) (England) (Amendment) Regulations 1997 (S.I. 1997/2173)
- Education (Grants for Education Support and Training) (England) (Amendment) Regulations 1997 (S.I. 1997/2174)
- Education (Grant-Maintained Special Schools) (Amendment) Regulations 1997 (S.I. 1997/2175)
- Education (National Curriculum) (Assessment Arrangements for Key Stages 1, 2 and 3) (England) (Amendment) Order 1997 (S.I. 1997/2176)
- Public Telecommunication System Designation (ACC Long Distance UK Limited) (No. 2) Order 1997 (S.I. 1997/2177)
- Public Telecommunication System Designation (Coventry Cable Limited) Order 1997 (S.I. 1997/2178)
- Public Telecommunication System Designation (Diamond Cable Communications (UK) Limited) Order 1997 (S.I. 1997/2179)
- Public Telecommunication System Designation (Advanced Radio Telecom Limited) Order 1997 (S.I. 1997/2180)
- Public Telecommunication System Designation (RadioTel Systems Limited) Order 1997 (S.I. 1997/2181)
- Foods Intended for Use in Energy Restricted Diets for Weight Reduction Regulations 1997 (S.I. 1997/2182)
- Gaming Duty Regulations 1997 (S.I. 1997/2196)
- Income-related Benefits and Jobseeker's Allowance (Amendment) (No. 2) Regulations 1997 (S.I. 1997/2197)
- Criminal Procedure and Investigations Act 1996 (Appointed Day No. 6) Order 1997 (S.I. 1997/2199)
- Crime (Sentences) Act 1997 (Commencement No. 2 and Transitional Provisions) Order 1997 (S.I. 1997/2200)

== 2201–2300 ==
- Waste Management Licensing (Amendment) Regulations 1997 (S.I. 1997/2203)
- Registration of Marriages (Amendment) Regulations 1997 (S.I. 1997/2204)
- Food Protection (Emergency Prohibitions) (Oil and Chemical Pollution of Fish and Plants) (Revocation) Order 1997 (S.I. 1997/2206)
- Social Security (Recovery of Benefits) Regulations 1997 (S.I. 1997/2205)
- Immigration (Exemption from Control) (Amendment) (No. 2) Order 1997 (S.I. 1997/2207)
- Northern Ireland Arms Decommissioning Act 1997 (Immunities and Privileges) Order 1997 (S.I. 1997/2231)
- Bicester (Tibbett & Britten Consumer Limited Siding) Order 1997 (S.I. 1997/2232)
- Social Security (Recovery of Benefits) (Appeals) Regulations 1997 (S.I. 1997/2237)
- Food (Pistachios from Iran) (Emergency Control) Order 1997 (S.I. 1997/2238)
- "Social Security (Claims and Payments and Adjudication) Amendment Regulations 1997 (S.I. 1997/2239 (This instrument has been revoked and replaced by S.I. 1997/2290))". opsi.gov.uk.
- Charities (Clergy Orphan Corporation) Order 1997 (S.I. 1997/2240)
- Education (Funding for Teacher Training) Designation (No. 3) Order 1997 (S.I. 1997/2258)
- Local Government Act 1988 (Defined Activities) (Exemption) (Brent London Borough Council and Harrogate Borough Council) Order 1997 (S.I. 1997/2259)
- Road Traffic Act 1991 (Commencement No. 14) (Scotland) Order 1997 (S.I. 1997/2260)
- Local Authorities' Variation of Charges at Off-street and Designated Parking Places (Notice Procedure) (Scotland) Regulations 1997 (S.I. 1997/2261)
- Mid-Norfolk Railway Order 1997 (S.I. 1997/2262)
- Portsmouth Health Care National Health Service Trust (Transfer of Trust Property) (No. 2) Order 1997 (S.I. 1997/2276)
- A127 Trunk Road (Southend Arterial Road, Havering) (50 MPH Speed Limit) Order 1997 (S.I. 1997/2281)
- Motor Cycle (EC Type Approval) (Amendment) Regulations 1997 (S.I. 1997/2282)
- National Crime Squad Service Authority (Levying) Order 1997 (S.I. 1997/2283)
- NCIS Service Authority (Levying) Order 1997 (S.I. 1997/2284)
- A1 Trunk Road (Islington) (Temporary Prohibition of Traffic) Order 1997 (S.I. 1997/2285)
- National Health Service (Proposals for Pilot Schemes) and (Miscellaneous Amendments) Regulations 1997 (S.I. 1997/2289)
- Social Security (Claims and Payments and Adjudication) Amendment No. 2 Regulations 1997 (S.I. 1997/2290)
- Local Government Act 1988 (Defined Activities) (Exemption) (Croydon London Borough Council) Order 1997 (S.I. 1997/2291)
- Local Government Act 1988 (Defined Activities) (Exemption) (Oadby and Wigston Borough Council and Havering London Borough Council) Order 1997 (SI 1997/2292)
- Number of Members of Thames Valley Police Authority Order 1997 (S.I. 1997/2293)
- Fireworks (Safety) Regulations 1997 (SI 1997/2294)
- Antarctic Act 1994 (Commencement) (No. 2) Order 1997 (SI 1997/2298)
- A1 Trunk Road (Barnet) Red Route (Clearway) traf|fi|c Order 1996 Variation Order 1997 (SI 1997/2299)
- A1 Trunk Road (Barnet) Red Route Traffic Order 1997 (SI 1997/2300)

== 2301–2400 ==
- A41 Trunk Road (Camden) (Temporary Prohibition of Traffic) (No. 2) Order 1997 (S.I. 1997/2301)
- Building Societies (Designation of Prescribed Regulatory Authorities) Order 1997 (S.I. 1997/2302)
- Road Traffic (Permitted Parking Area and Special Parking Area) (County of Hertfordshire) (Borough of Watford) Order 1997 (S.I. 1997/2304)
- Social Security (Miscellaneous Amendments) (No. 4) Regulations 1997 (S.I. 1997/2305)
- Companies (Membership of Holding Company) (Dealers in Securities) Regulations 1997 (S.I. 1997/2306)
- Children (Protection from Offenders) (Miscellaneous Amendments) Regulations 1997 (S.I. 1997/2308)
- Firemen's Pension Scheme (Amendment) Order 1997 (S.I. 1997/2309)
- Civil Courts (Amendment No. 3) Order 1997 (S.I. 1997/2310)
- Social Fund Cold Weather Payments (General) Amendment Regulations 1997 (S.I. 1997/2311)
- Parole Board (Scotland) Amendment Rules 1997 (S.I. 1997/2317)
- M8 and M9 Special Roads (Newbridge Grade Separation) Speed Limit Regulations 1997 (S.I. 1997/2322)
- Crime and Punishment (Scotland) Act 1997 (Commencement No.2 and Transitional and Consequential Provisions) Order 1997 (S.I. 1997/2323)
- A501 Trunk Road (Camden and Islington) Red Route Traffic Order 1997 (S.I. 1997/2326)
- Housing (Right to Buy) (Priority of Charges) (No. 2) Order 1997 (S.I. 1997/2327)
- Local Government Act 1988 (Defined Activities) (Exemption) (Stockton on Tees Borough Council) Order 1997 (S.I. 1997/2328)
- Procurement of Air Navigation Equipment (Technical Specifications) Regulations 1997 (S.I. 1997/2329)
- Statistical Returns (Carriage of Goods and Passengers by Sea) Regulations 1997 (S.I. 1997/2330)
- Diseases of Animals (Approved Disinfectants) (Amendment) Order 1997 (S.I. 1997/2347)
- Registration of Births, Still-births, Deaths and Marriages (Prescription of Forms) (Scotland) Regulations 1997 (S.I. 1997/2348)
- Marriage (Prescription of Forms) (Scotland) Regulations 1997 (S.I. 1997/2349)
- Curfew Order (Responsible Officer) Order 1997 (S.I. 1997/2351)
- Education Act 1996 (Commencement No. 3) Order 1997 (S.I. 1997/2352)
- Education (Disability Statements for Local Education Authorities) (Wales) Regulations 1997 (S.I. 1997/2353)
- Prevention of Water Pollution (Loch Lomond) (Extension of Period of Byelaws) Order 1997 (S.I. 1997/2354)
- Education (School Performance Information) (England) (Amendment) (No. 2) Regulations 1997 (S.I. 1997/2364)
- Bovine Spongiform Encephalopathy Compensation (Amendment) Order 1997 (S.I. 1997/2365)
- Merchant Shipping (Carriage of Cargoes) (Amendment) Regulations 1997 (S.I. 1997/2366)
- Merchant Shipping (Dangerous Goods and Marine Pollutants) Regulations 1997 (S.I. 1997/2367)
- A4 Trunk Road (Hillingdon) Red Route (Clearway) Traffic Order 1996 Variation Order 1997 (S.I. 1997/2385)
- A406 Trunk Road (Ealing and Hounslow) Red Route Traffic Order 1997 (S.I. 1997/2386)
- Bovine Spongiform Encephalopathy (No. 2) (Amendment) Order 1997 (S.I. 1997/2387)
- Personal Pension Schemes (Establishment of Schemes) Order 1997 (S.I. 1997/2388)
- Airports (Groundhandling) Regulations 1997 (S.I. 1997/2389)
- Police Act 1997 (Commencement No. 4 and Transitional Provisions) Order 1997 (S.I. 1997/2390)
- Police Act 1997 (Provisions in relation to the NCIS Service Authority) (No. 2) Order 1997 (S.I. 1997/2391)
- Finance Act 1997 (Commencement No. 1) Order 1997 (S.I. 1997/2392)
- National Health Service (Travelling Expenses and Remission of Charges) Amendment (No. 2) Regulations 1997 (S.I. 1997/2393)
- Legal Aid in Family Proceedings (Remuneration) (Amendment) Regulations 1997 (S.I. 1997/2394)
- Education (Grants for Education Support and Training) (Wales) (Amendment) Regulations 1997 (S.I. 1997/2395)
- Zebra, Pelican and Puffin Pedestrian Crossings Regulations and General Directions 1997 (S.I. 1997/2400) (This SI has been amended by S.I. 1998/901

== 2401–2500 ==
- A406 Trunk Road (North Circular Road, Hounslow) Red Route (Prescribed Route) Traffic Order 1997 (S.I. 1997/2401)
- A205 Trunk Road (Hounslow) Red Route (Bus Lanes) Traffic Order 1997 (S.I. 1997/2402)
- A30 Trunk Road (Great South West Road, Hounslow) (Temporary Prohibition of Traffic) Order 1997 (S.I. 1997/2403)
- Police Authorities (Standing Orders) Regulations 1997 (S.I. 1997/2416)
- Social Security Administration (Fraud) Act 1997 (Commencement No. 3) Order 1997 (S.I. 1997/2417)
- Magistrates' Courts (Children and Young Persons) (Amendment) Rules 1997 (S.I. 1997/2420)
- Magistrates' Courts (Forms) (Amendment) (No. 2) Rules 1997 (S.I. 1997/2421)
- Gas Act 1986 (Exemption) Order 1997 (S.I. 1997/2427)
- Finance Act 1997 (Stamp Duty and Stamp Duty Reserve Tax) (Appointed Day) Order 1997 (S.I. 1997/2428)
- Stamp Duty and Stamp Duty Reserve Tax (Investment Exchanges and Clearing Houses) Regulations 1997 (S.I. 1997/2429)
- Stamp Duty Reserve Tax (Amendment) Regulations 1997 (S.I. 1997/2430)
- Housing Benefit and Council Tax Benefit (General) Amendment (No. 2) Regulations 1997 (S.I. 1997/2434)
- Housing Benefit (Recovery of Overpayments) Regulations 1997 (S.I. 1997/2435)
- Housing Benefit (Information from Landlords and Agents) Regulations 1997 (S.I. 1997/2436)
- Value Added Tax (Amendment) (No. 4) Regulations 1997 (S.I. 1997/2437)
- Vehicle Excise Duty (Immobilisation, Removal and Disposal of Vehicles) Regulations 1997 (S.I. 1997/2439)
- Education (Individual Performance Information) (Prescribed Bodies and Persons) Regulations 1997 (S.I. 1997/2440)
- Potatoes Originating in The Netherlands Regulations 1997 (S.I. 1997/2441)
- Prescription as "Persons in Need" (Persons subject to Immigration Control) (Scotland) Order 1997 (S.I. 1997/2452)
- Oxleas National Health Service Trust (Transfer of Trust Property) Order 1997 (S.I. 1997/2453)
- A205 Trunk Road (Lewisham) Red Route (Bus Lane) (No.2) Experimental Traffic Order 1997 (S.I. 1997/2454)
- National Health Service (Travelling Expenses and Remission of Charges) (Scotland) Amendment (No. 2) Regulations 1997 (S.I. 1997/2455)
- Local Government Changes for England (Direct Labour Organisations) (County of Leicestershire and District of Rutland) Order 1997 (S.I. 1997/2456)
- National Health Service (Primary Care) Act 1997 (Commencement No. 2) Order 1997 (S.I. 1997/2457)
- Local Government Act 1988 (Defined Activities) (Exemption) (Chichester District Council and Mole Valley District Council) Order 1997 (S.I. 1997/2458)
- Export of Goods (United Nations Sanctions) (Sierra Leone) Order 1997 (S.I. 1997/2464)
- North Tyneside Steam Railway Order 1997 (S.I. 1997/2465)
- Railtrack (Ammanford Level Crossings) Order 1997 (S.I. 1997/2466)
- Local Government Pension Scheme (Burnley and Pendle Transport Company Limited) Regulations 1997 (S.I. 1997/2467)
- National Health Service (General Medical Services) Amendment (No. 3) Regulations 1997 (S.I. 1997/2468)
- National Health Service (Fund-Holding Practices Audit) (Scotland) Regulations 1997 (S.I. 1997/2469)
- Surface Waters (Shellfish) (Classification) (Scotland) Regulations 1997 (S.I. 1997/2470)
- Surface Waters (Fishlife) (Classification) (Scotland) Regulations 1997 (S.I. 1997/2471)
- National Health Service (Optical Charges and Payments) Amendment Regulations 1997 (S.I. 1997/2488)
- A1 Trunk Road (Barnet) Red Route (Clearway) Traffic Order 1997 (S.I. 1997/2489)
- Income Tax (Payments on Account) (Amendment) Regulations 1997 This SI has been made because of a defect in SI 1996 No. 1654 S.I. 1997/2491)
- National Health Service (Optical Charges and Payments) (Scotland) Amendment (No.2) Regulations 1997 (S.I. 1997/2492)
- Offshore Installations (Safety Zones) (No. 4) Order 1997 (S.I. 1997/2498)
- Plant Protection Products (Amendment) (No. 2) Regulations 1997 (S.I. 1997/2499)
- Sheep Annual Premium (Amendment) Regulations 1997 (S.I. 1997/2500)

== 2501–2600 ==
- Licensing (Fees) (Variation) Order 1997 (S.I. 1997/2501)
- Local Government Act 1988 (Defined Activities) (Exemption) (Reigate and Banstead Borough Council, Vale of White Horse District Council and Aylesbury Vale District Council) Order 1997 (S.I. 1997/2502)
- A4 Trunk Road (Great West Road, Hounslow) Red Route (Temporary Prohibition of Traffic) (No.3) Order 1997 (S.I. 1997/2503)
- A4 Trunk Road (Talgarth Road, Hammersmith & Fulham) Red Route (Temporary Prohibition of Traffic) Order 1997 (S.I. 1997/2504)
- Health and Safety (Fees) Regulations 1997 (S.I. 1997/2505)
- Food Protection (Emergency Prohibitions) (Oil and Chemical Pollution of Fish) Order 1997 (S.I. 1997/2509)
- Greater Manchester Ambulance Service National Health Service Trust (Establishment) Amendment Order 1997 (S.I. 1997/2518)
- Act of Sederunt (Judicial Factor Rules) (Amendment No. 2) 1997 (S.I. 1997/2533)
- Caernarfon Railway Light Railway Order 1997 (S.I. 1997/2534)
- A2 Trunk Road (A296 Watling Street Slip Road) (Trunking) Order 1997 (S.I. 1997/2535)
- Protection of Wrecks (Designation No. 4) Order 1997 (S.I. 1997/2536)
- Imported Food Regulations 1997 (S.I. 1997/2537)
- Social Fund Maternity and Funeral Expenses (General) Amendment Regulations 1997 (S.I. 1997/2538)
- Dundee Port Authority (Dissolution) Order 1997 (S.I. 1997/2539)
- Local Government Act 1988 (Defined Activities) (Exemption) (Gloucester City Council and North West Leicestershire District Council) Order 1997 (S.I. 1997/2540)
- Value Added Tax (Payments on Account) (Appeals) Order 1997 (S.I. 1997/2542)
- Financial Services Act 1986 (Extension of Scope of Act) Order 1997 (Approved by Parliament) S.I. 1997/2543)
- Coroners' Records (Fees for Copies) Rules 1997 (S.I. 1997/2544)
- Value Added Tax (Refund of Tax) Order 1997 (S.I. 1997/2558)
- Occupational Pension Schemes (Payments to Employers) Amendment Regulations 1997 (S.I. 1997/2559)
- Surface Waters (Dangerous Substances) (Classification) Regulations 1997 (S.I. 1997/2560)
- Public Telecommunication System Designation (Viatel UK Limited) Order 1997 (S.I. 1997/2561)
- Professions Supplementary to Medicine (Registration Rules) (Amendment) Order of Council 1997 (S.I. 1997/2562)
- European Communities (Designation) (No. 3) Order 1997 (S.I. 1997/2563)
- Education (Inspectors of Schools in England) Order 1997 (S.I. 1997/2564)
- Carriage by Air and Road Act 1979 (Commencement No. 2) Order 1997 (S.I. 1997/2565)
- Merchant Shipping (Liability and Compensation for Oil Pollution Damage) (Transitional Provisions) (Revocation) Order 1997 (S.I. 1997/2566)
- Merchant Shipping (Oil Pollution Preparedness, Response and Cooperation Convention) Order 1997 (S.I. 1997/2567)
- Merchant Shipping (Prevention of Pollution) (Intervention) (Foreign Ships) Order 1997 (S.I. 1997/2568)
- Merchant Shipping (Prevention of Pollution) (Amendment) Order 1997 (S.I. 1997/2569)
- Angola (United Nations Prohibition of Flights) (Dependent Territories) Order 1997 (S.I. 1997/2570)
- Angola (United Nations Prohibition of Flights) Order 1997 (S.I. 1997/2571)
- Angola (United Nations Sanctions) Order 1997 (S.I. 1997/2572)
- Angola (United Nations Sanctions) (Dependent Territories) Order 1997 (S.I. 1997/2573)
- Child Abduction and Custody (Cayman Islands) Order 1997 (S.I. 1997/2574)
- Child Abduction and Custody (Parties to Conventions) (Amendment) (No. 2) Order 1997 (S.I. 1997/2575)
- European Communities (Definition of Treaties) (Framework Cooperation Agreement between the European Community and its Member States and the Republic of Chile) Order 1997 (S.I. 1997/2576)
- European Communities (Definition of Treaties) (Euro-Mediterranean Agreement Establishing an Association between the European Communities and their Member States and the Kingdom of Morocco) Order 1997 (S.I. 1997/2577)
- Merchant Shipping (Liability and Compensation for Oil Pollution Damage) (Transitional Provisions) (Overseas Territories) Order 1997 (S.I. 1997/2578)
- Merchant Shipping (Limitation of Liability for Maritime Claims) (Overseas Territories) Order 1997 (S.I. 1997/2579)
- Merchant Shipping (Oil Pollution) (Anguilla) Order 1997 (S.I. 1997/2580)
- Merchant Shipping (Oil Pollution) (Bermuda) Order 1997 (S.I. 1997/2581)
- Merchant Shipping (Oil Pollution) (British Antarctic Territory) Order 1997 (S.I. 1997/2582)
- Merchant Shipping (Oil Pollution) (British Indian Ocean Territory) Order 1997 (S.I. 1997/2583)
- Merchant Shipping (Oil Pollution) (Falkland Islands) Order 1997 (S.I. 1997/2584)
- Merchant Shipping (Oil Pollution) (Pitcairn) Order 1997 (S.I. 1997/2585)
- Merchant Shipping (Salvage Convention) (Overseas Territories) Order 1997 (S.I. 1997/2586)
- Merchant Shipping (Oil Pollution) (Sovereign Base Areas) Order 1997 (S.I. 1997/2587)
- Merchant Shipping (Oil Pollution) (South Georgia and the South Sandwich Islands) Order 1997 (S.I. 1997/2588)
- Merchant Shipping (Oil Pollution) (Turks and Caicos Islands) Order 1997 (S.I. 1997/2589)
- Merchant Shipping (Oil Pollution) (Virgin Islands) Order 1997 (S.I. 1997/2590)
- State Immunity (Merchant Shipping) Order 1997 (S.I. 1997/2591)
- Sierra Leone (United Nations Sanctions) Order 1997 (S.I. 1997/2592)
- Sierra Leone (United Nations Sanctions) (Dependent Territories) Order 1997 (S.I. 1997/2593)
- Angola (United Nations Sanctions) (Channel Islands) Order 1997 (S.I. 1997/2594)
- Angola (United Nations Sanctions) (Isle of Man) Order 1997 (S.I. 1997/2595)
- European Convention on Extradition Order 1990 (Amendment) (No. 2) Order 1997 (S.I. 1997/2596)
- Health and Personal Social Services (Private Finance) (Northern Ireland) Order 1997 (S.I. 1997/2597)
- Merchant Shipping (Oil Pollution) (Jersey) Order 1997 (S.I. 1997/2598)
- Sierra Leone (United Nations Sanctions) (Channel Islands) Order 1997 (S.I. 1997/2599)
- Sierra Leone (United Nations Sanctions) (Isle of Man) Order 1997 (S.I. 1997/2600)

== 2601–2700 ==
- Reciprocal Enforcement of Judgments (Administration of Justice Act 1920, Part II) (Amendment) Order 1997 (S.I. 1997/2601)
- Civil Jurisdiction and Judgments Act 1982 (Gibraltar) Order 1997 (S.I. 1997/2602)
- European Communities (Definition of Treaties) (Inter-regional Framework Co-operation Agreement between the European Community and its Member States and the Southern Common Market and its Party States) Order 1997 (S.I. 1997/2603)
- Income Support (General) (Standard Interest Rate Amendment) (No. 3) Regulations 1997 (S.I. 1998/2604)
- Nevill Hall and District National Health Service Trust (Establishment) Amendment Order 1997 (S.I. 1997/2605)
- Local Authorities (Armorial Bearings) (No. 2) Order 1997 (S.I. 1997/2618)
- Housing Benefit (Recovery of Overpayments) (No. 2) Regulations 1997 (S.I. 1997/2619)
- National Health Service (Primary Care) Act 1997 (Commencement No. 3) Order 1997 (S.I. 1997/2620)
- City of Stoke-on-Trent Birches Head Road Canal Footbridge Scheme, 1997 Confirmation Instrument 1997 (S.I. 1997/2621)
- Food Protection (Emergency Prohibitions) (Dounreay Nuclear Establishment) Order 1997 (S.I. 1997/2622)
- Combined Probation Areas (Bedfordshire) Order 1997 (S.I. 1997/2623)
- Education (Pupil Registration) (Amendment) Regulations 1997 (S.I. 1997/2624)
- Scottish Examination Board and Scottish Vocational Education Council (Dissolution) (Scotland) Order 1997 (S.I. 1997/2634)
- Gilt Strips (Consequential Amendments) Regulations 1997 (S.I. 1997/2646)
- Legal Aid in Criminal and Care Proceedings (General) (Amendment) (No. 4) Regulations 1997 (S.I. 1997/2647)
- Local Government Act 1988 (Defined Activities) (Exemptions) (Wales) (Amendment) Order 1997 (S.I. 1997/2648)
- Local Government Act 1988 (Competition) (Wales) (No. 2) Regulations 1997 (S.I. 1997/2649)
- Rhondda Health Care National Health Service Trust (Transfer of Trust Property) Order 1997 (S.I. 1997/2651)
- East Glamorgan National Health Service Trust (Transfer of Trust Property) Order 1997 (S.I. 1997/2652)
- Act of Adjournal (Criminal Procedure Rules Amendment No. 7) 1997 (S.I. 1997/2653)
- A316 Trunk Road (Hounslow) Red Route Experimental Traffic Order 1997 (S.I. 1997/2655)
- A316 Trunk Road (Hounslow and Richmond) Red Route (Clearway) Traffic Order 1997 (S.I. 1997/2656)
- A4 Trunk Road (Hounslow and Hammersmith & Fulham) Red Route (Clearway) Traffic Order 1997 (S.I. 1997/2657)
- Smoke Control Areas (Authorised Fuels) (Amendment) Regulations 1997 (S.I. 1997/2658)
- Air Navigation (Dangerous Goods) (Second Amendment) Regulations 1997 (S.I. 1997/2666)
- Judicial Pensions (Requisite Surviving Spouses' Benefits etc.) Order 1997 (S.I. 1997/2667)
- Building Societies Act 1997 (Commencement No. 3) Order 1997 (S.I. 1997/2668)
- Social Security Administration (Fraud) Act 1997 (Commencement No. 4) Order 1997 (S.I. 1997/2669)
- County Court Fees (Amendment) (No. 2) Order 1997 (S.I. 1997/2670)
- Family Proceedings Fees (Amendment) (No. 4) Order 1997 (S.I. 1997/2671)
- Supreme Court Fees (Amendment) Order 1997 (S.I. 1997/2672)
- Food Industry Development Scheme 1997 (S.I. 1997/2673)
- Food Industry Development Scheme (Specification of Activities) Order 1997 (S.I. 1997/2674)
- Coast Protection (Variation of Excluded Waters) Regulations 1997 (S.I. 1997/2675)
- Social Security (National Insurance Number Information: Exemption) Regulations 1997 (S.I. 1997/2676)
- Jobseeker's Allowance (Amendment) (No. 2) Regulations 1997 (S.I. 1997/2677)
- Teacher Training Agency (Additional Functions) Order 1997 (S.I. 1997/2678)
- Education (Teachers) (Amendment) (No. 2) Regulations 1997 (S.I. 1997/2679)
- Criminal Procedure and Investigations Act 1996 (Defence Disclosure Time Limits) Regulations 1997 (S.I. 1997/2680)
- Lloyd's Underwriters (Scottish Limited Partnerships) (Tax) Regulations 1997 (S.I. 1997/2681)
- A501 Trunk Road (Camden) (Temporary Prohibition of Traffic) Order 1997 (S.I. 1997/2682)
- Portsmouth City Council (M275 Northbound Motorway Slip Road) Scheme 1996 Confirmation Instrument 1997 (S.I. 1997/2683)
- Mersey Regional Ambulance Service National Health Service Trust (Establishment) Amendment Order 1997 (S.I. 1997/2690)
- Oxleas National Health Service Trust (Transfer of Trust Property) Amendment Order 1997 (S.I. 1997/2691)
- Act of Sederunt (Rules of the Court of Session Amendment No.8) (Early Disposal of Reclaiming Motions and Appeals) 1997 (S.I. 1997/2692)
- Building Societies (Prescribed Equitable Interests) Order 1997 (S.I. 1997/2693)
- Crime and Punishment (Scotland) Act 1997 (Commencement No. 3) Order 1997 (S.I. 1997/2694)
- Berkshire Fire Services (Combination Scheme) Order 1997 (S.I. 1997/2695)
- Cambridgeshire Fire Services (Combination Scheme) Order 1997 (S.I. 1997/2696)
- Cheshire Fire Services (Combination Scheme) Order 1997 (S.I. 1997/2697)
- Devon Fire Services (Combination Scheme) Order 1997 (S.I. 1997/2698)
- Essex Fire Services (Combination Scheme) Order 1997 (S.I. 1997/2699)
- Hereford and Worcester Fire Services (Combination Scheme) Order 1997 (S.I. 1997/2700)

== 2701–2800 ==
- Kent Fire Services (Combination Scheme) Order 1997 (S.I. 1997/2701)
- Shropshire Fire Services (Combination Scheme) Order 1997 (S.I. 1997/2702)
- SECTION 7 OF THE PETROLEUM (PRODUCTION) ACT 1934 AND SECTION 2(1)(a) OF THE PETROLEUM ACT 1987 (MODIFICATION) REGULATIONS 1997 (S.I. 1997/2703)
- Companies Act 1985 (Insurance Companies Accounts) (Minor Amendments) Regulations 1997 (S.I. 1997/2704)
- Income Tax (Paying and Collecting Agents) (Amendment) Regulations 1997 (S.I. 1997/2705)
- Income Tax (Manufactured Overseas Dividends) (Amendment No. 2) Regulations 1997 (S.I. 1997/2706)
- Taxes (Interest Rate) (Amendment No. 2) Regulations 1997 (S.I. 1997/2707)
- Finance Act 1989, section 178(1), (Appointed Day) Order 1997 (S.I. 1997/2708)
- Education (Individual Pupils' Achievements) (Information) (Wales) (Amendment) Regulations 1997 (S.I. 1997/2709)
- Camus an Lighe, Loch Ceann Traigh, Argyll, Oysters and Scallops Several Fishery Order 1997 (S.I. 1997/2711)
- International Fund for Agricultural Development (Fourth Replenishment) Order 1997 (S.I. 1997/2712)
- Asian Development Bank (Sixth Replenishment of the Asian Development Fund) Order 1997 (S.I. 1997/2713)
- Building Societies (Transfer Resolutions) Order 1997 (S.I. 1997/2714)
- Local Government Act 1988 (Competition) (England) (No. 2) Regulations 1997 (S.I. 1997/2732)
- Local Government Act 1988 (Defined Activities) (Housing Management and Security Work) (Exemptions) (England) (Amendment) Order 1997 (S.I. 1997/2733)
- Local Government Changes for England (Housing Management) (Miscellaneous Amendments) Regulations 1997 (S.I. 1997/2734)
- Food Protection (Emergency Prohibitions) (Oil and Chemical Pollution of Fish) Order 1997 (Partial Revocation) Order 1997 (S.I. 1997/2735)
- City of Westminster (A41 Trunk Road) Red Route (Bus Lanes) Traffic Order 1997 (S.I. 1997/2743)
- Value Added Tax (Drugs, Medicines and Aids for the Handicapped) Order 1997 (S.I. 1997/2744)
- Local Government Act 1988 (Defined Activities) (Exemptions) (Amendment) Order 1997 (S.I. 1997/2746)
- Local Government Act 1988 (Competition) (Revocations) Regulations 1997 (S.I. 1997/2747)
- Local Government Act 1988 (Defined Activities) (Exemptions) (Schools) Order 1997 (S.I. 1997/2748)
- A23 Trunk Road (Croydon) Red Route Traffic Order 1997 Variation Order 1997 (S.I. 1997/2749)
- Mink (Keeping) (Amendment) Regulations 1997 (S.I. 1997/2750)
- Coypus (Special Licence) (Fees) Regulations 1997 (S.I. 1997/2751)
- Local Government and Rating Act 1997 (Commencement No. 2) Order 1997 (S.I. 1997/2752)
- Local Government (Direct Labour Organisations) (Competition) (Amendment) Regulations 1997 (S.I. 1997/2756)
- Sole, Plaice, etc. (Specified Sea Areas) (Prohibition of Fishing) Order 1997 (S.I. 1997/2757)
- Export of Goods (Control) (Amendment No. 3) Order 1997 (S.I. 1997/2758)
- Dual-Use and Related Goods (Export Control) (Amendment No. 4) Regulations 1997 (S.I. 1997/2759)
- Lancashire Fire Services (Combination Scheme) Order 1997 (S.I. 1997/2760)
- Nottinghamshire Fire Services (Combination Scheme) Order 1997 (S.I. 1997/2761)
- Civil Courts (Amendment No. 4) Order 1997 (S.I. 1997/2762)
- Public Bodies (Admission to Meetings) (National Health Service Trusts) Order 1997 (S.I. 1997/2763)
- Relocation Grants Regulations 1997 (S.I. 1997/2764)
- M40 Motorway (Wheatley Service Area Access) Connecting Roads Scheme 1997 (S.I. 1997/2765)
- Social Security Administration (Fraud) Act 1997 (Commencement No. 5) Order 1997 (S.I. 1997/2766)
- South Yorkshire Metropolitan Ambulance and Paramedic Service National Health Service Trust (Establishment) Amendment Order 1997 (S.I. 1997/2767)
- Public Telecommunication System Designation (Atlantic Telecommunications Limited) Order 1997 (S.I. 1997/2768)
- Public Telecommunication System Designation (WORLDxCHANGE Communications Limited) Order 1997 (S.I. 1997/2769)
- Public Telecommunications System Designation (First Telecom plc) Order 1997 (S.I. 1997/2770)
- Public Telecommunication System Designation (American Telemedia Limited) Order 1997 (S.I. 1997/2771)
- Public Telecommunication System Designation (TotalTel International Inc.) Order 1997 (S.I. 1997/2772)
- Education (Assisted Places) (Scotland) Amendment (No.2) Regulations 1997 (S.I. 1997/2773)
- Education (Schools) Act 1997 (Commencement) Order 1997 (S.I. 1997/2774)
- Diving at Work Regulations 1997 (S.I. 1997/2776)
- Industrial Pollution Control (Northern Ireland) Order 1997 (S.I. 1997/2777)
- Waste and Contaminated Land (Northern Ireland) Order 1997 (S.I. 1997/2778)
- Shops (Sunday Trading &c.) (Northern Ireland) Order 1997 (S.I. 1997/2779)
- Civil Jurisdiction and Judgments Act 1982 (Provisional and Protective Measures) (Scotland) Order 1997 (S.I. 1997/2780)
- Transfer of Functions (Insurance) Order 1997 (S.I. 1997/2781)
- A1 Trunk Road (Islington High Street) Red Route (Prohibited Turn) Traffic Order 1997 (S.I. 1997/2782)
- A1 Trunk Road (Islington) Red Route Traffic Order 1993 Variation Order 1997 (S.I. 1997/2783)
- London Borough of Islington (Trunk Roads) Red Route (Bus Lanes) Experimental Traffic Order 1997 (S.I. 1997/2784)
- A4 Trunk Road (Hammersmith & Fulham and Kensington & Chelsea) Red Route Experimental Traffic Order 1997 (S.I. 1997/2785)
- A41 Trunk Road (Camden) (Temporary Prohibition of Traffic) (No. 3) Order 1997 (S.I. 1997/2786)
- National Health Service (Vocational Training) Amendment Regulations 1997 (S.I. 1997/2787)
- Staffordshire Ambulance Service National Health Service Trust (Establishment) Amendment Order 1997 (S.I. 1997/2788)
- Horse Passports Order 1997 (S.I. 1997/2789)
- Grants for School Improvements (Scotland) Regulations 1997 (S.I. 1997/2790)
- Police Cadets (Scotland) Amendment Regulations 1997 (S.I. 1997/2791)
- Non-Domestic Rating (Rural Settlements) (England) Order 1997 (S.I. 1997/2792)
- Income-related Benefits (Miscellaneous Amendments) Regulations 1997 (S.I. 1997/2793)

== 2801–2900 ==
- Social Security (Penalty Notice) Regulations 1997 (S.I. 1997/2813)
- Social Security (National Insurance Number Information: Exemption) (No. 2) Regulations 1997 (S.I. 1997/2814)
- Occupational Pensions (Revaluation) Order 1997 (S.I. 1997/2815)
- Education (School Performance Information) (England) (Amendment) (No. 3) Regulations 1997 (S.I. 1997/2816)
- National Health Service (Vocational Training for General Medical Practice) Regulations 1997 (S.I. 1997/2817)
- Combined Fire Authorities (Protection from Personal Liability) (Wales) Order 1997 (S.I. 1997/2818)
- Combined Fire Authorities (Protection from Personal Liability) (England) Regulations 1997 (S.I. 1997/2819)
- A205 Trunk Road (Perry Vale and Waldram Crescent, Lewisham) Red Route (Prohibited Turns) Traffic Order 1997 (S.I. 1997/2820)
- Public Telecommunication System Designation (Cable Thames Valley Limited) Order 1997 (S.I. 1997/2821)
- Public Telecommunication System Designation (General Telecommunications Limited) Order 1997 (S.I. 1997/2822)
- Public Telecommunication System Designation (Eurobell (Holdings) PLC) Order 1997 (S.I. 1997/2823)
- Act of Sederunt (Fees of Sheriff Officers) 1997 (S.I. 1997/2824)
- Act of Sederunt (Fees of Messengers-at-Arms) 1997 (S.I. 1997/2825)
- Local Government and Rating Act 1997 (Commencement No.3) Order 1997 (S.I. 1997/2826)
- Non-Domestic Rating (Rural Areas and Rateable Value Limits) (Scotland) Order 1997 (S.I. 1997/2827)
- Building Societies (Members' Resolutions) Order 1997 (S.I. 1997/2840)
- Sea Fishing (Enforcement of Community Conservation Measures) (Amendment) Order 1997 (S.I. 1997/2841)
- Local Government Changes for England (Property Transfer) (Humberside) Order 1997 (S.I. 1997/2842)
- Local Government (Contracts) Act 1997 (Commencement No. 1) Order 1997 (S.I. 1997/2843)
- Sheep Annual Premium and Suckler Cow Premium Quotas Regulations 1997 (S.I. 1997/2844)
- Housing Grants, Construction and Regeneration Act 1996 (Commencement No. 3) Order 1997 (S.I. 1997/2846)
- Relocation Grants (Form of Application) Regulations 1997 (S.I. 1997/2847)
- A1 Trunk Road (Haringey) (Temporary Prohibition of Traffic) Order 1997 (S.I. 1997/2848)
- Friendly Societies (Amendment) Regulations 1997 (S.I. 1997/2849)
- A10 Trunk Road (Haringey) (Temporary Prohibition of Traffic) Order 1997 (S.I. 1997/2850)
- Firemen's Pension Scheme (Amendment No. 2) Order 1997 (S.I. 1997/2851)
- Police Pensions (Amendment) (No. 2) Regulations 1997 (S.I. 1997/2852)
- Local Authorities (Contracts) Regulations 1997 (S.I. 1997/2862)
- Social Security Amendment (New Deal) Regulations 1997 (S.I. 1997/2863)
- Statistics of Trade (Customs and Excise) (Amendment) Regulations 1997 (S.I. 1997/2864)
- Insurance Companies (Pension Business) (Transitional Provisions) (Amendment) Regulations 1997 (S.I. 1997/2865)
- Wheeled Child Conveyances (Safety) Regulations 1997 (S.I. 1997/2866)
- Non-Domestic Rating Contributions (Scotland) Amendment Regulations 1997 (S.I. 1997/2867)
- Environmentally Sensitive Areas (Preseli) Designation (Amendment No. 2) Order 1997 (S.I. 1997/2868)
- Building Societies (Prescribed Form of Receipt) Rules 1997 (S.I. 1997/2869)
- Treasury Solicitor (Crown's Nominee) Rules 1997 (S.I. 1997/2870)
- Medicines (Pharmacies) (Applications for Registration and Fees) Amendment Regulations 1997 (S.I. 1997/2876)
- Friendly Societies (Modification of the Corporation Tax Acts) (Amendment No. 2) Regulations 1997 (S.I. 1997/2877)
- Local Government (Contracts) Act 1997 (Commencement No.2) Order 1997 (S.I. 1997/2878)
- Local Authorities (Contracts) (Scotland) Regulations 1997 (S.I. 1997/2879)
- Local Government Property Commission (Scotland) (Winding Up) Order 1997 (S.I. 1997/2880)
- Medicines (Restrictions on the Administration of Veterinary Medicinal Products) Amendment Regulations 1997 (S.I. 1997/2884)
- Non-Domestic Rating (Rural Settlements) (Wales) Order 1997 (S.I. 1997/2885)
- Merchant Shipping (Master's Discretion) Regulations 1997 (S.I. 1997/2886)
- Value Added Tax (Amendment) (No. 5) Regulations 1997 (S.I. 1997/2887)
- Local Government Act 1988 (Defined Activities) (Exemption) (Easington District Council, Epping Forest District Council and London Borough of Merton) Order 1997 (S.I. 1997/2888)
- Local Government Act 1988 (Defined Activities) (Exemption) (Stevenage Borough Council and Three Rivers District Council) Order 1997 (S.I. 1997/2889)
- Sole, Plaice, etc. (Specified Sea Areas) (Prohibition of Fishing) (No. 2) Order 1997 (S.I. 1997/2891)
- Medicines (Veterinary Drugs) (Pharmacy and Merchants' List) (Amendment) Order 1997 (S.I. 1997/2892)
- Charges for Inspections and Controls Regulations 1997 (S.I. 1997/2893)
- Animal By-Products (Amendment) Order 1997 (S.I. 1997/2894)

== 2901–3000 ==
- Transport and Works (Descriptions of Works Interfering with Navigation) (Amendment) Order 1997 (S.I. 1997/2906)
- Plant Health (Great Britain) (Amendment) (No. 2) Order 1997 (S.I. 1997/2907)
- Local Government Act 1988 (Defined Activities) (Exemption) (Bath and North East Somerset District Council) Order 1997 (S.I. 1997/2908)
- Public Telecommunication System Designation (Sussex Cable & Telecoms Limited) Order 1997 (S.I. 1997/2909)
- Public Telecommunication System Designation (Shropshire Cable & Telecoms Limited) Order 1997 (S.I. 1997/2910)
- Insurance Companies (Accounts and Statements) (Amendment) Regulations 1997 (S.I. 1997/2911)
- Civil Aviation (Air Travel Organisers' Licensing) (Second Amendment) Regulations 1997 (S.I. 1997/2912)
- Courses for Drink-Drive Offenders (Designation of Areas) Order 1997 (S.I. 1997/2913)
- Cosmetic Products (Safety) (Amendment) Regulations 1997 (S.I. 1997/2914)
- Motor Vehicles (Driving Licences) (Amendment) (No. 5) Regulations 1997 (S.I. 1997/2915)
- Minibus and Other Section 19 Permit Buses (Amendment) Regulations 1997 (S.I. 1997/2916)
- Community Bus (Amendment) Regulations 1997 (S.I. 1997/2917)
- Education (Particulars of Independent Schools) Regulations 1997 (S.I. 1997/2918)
- Education (Student Loans) (Amendment) Regulations 1997 (S.I. 1997/2919)
- Civil Aviation (Route Charges for Navigation Services) Regulations 1997 (S.I. 1997/2920)
- A205 Trunk Road (Southwark) Red Route (Bus Lanes) Experimental Traffic Order 1997 (S.I. 1997/2921)
- A23 Trunk Road (Lambeth) Red Route Experimental Traffic Order 1997 (S.I. 1997/2922)
- European Specialist Medical Qualifications Amendment Regulations 1997 (S.I. 1997/2928)
- National Health Service (Pilot Schemes — Health Service Bodies) Regulations 1997 (S.I. 1997/2929)
- Telecommunications (Licensing) Regulations 1997 (S.I. 1997/2930)
- Telecommunications (Interconnection) Regulations 1997 (S.I. 1997/2931)
- Telecommunications (Open Network Provision and Leased Lines) Regulations 1997 (S.I. 1997/2932)
- Motor Vehicles (Type Approval) (Great Britain) (Amendment) (No. 3) Regulations 1997 (S.I. 1997/2933)
- Motor Vehicles (Approval) (Amendment) (No. 2) Regulations 1997 (S.I. 1997/2934)
- Road Vehicles (Construction and Use) (Amendment) (No. 6) Regulations 1997 (S.I. 1997/2935)
- Motor Vehicles (Type Approval for Goods Vehicles) (Great Britain) (Amendment) (No. 2) Regulations 1997 (S.I. 1997/2936)
- Civil Aviation (Joint Financing) Regulations 1997 (S.I. 1997/2937)
- Southend Health Care Services National Health Service Trust (Change of Name) Order 1997 (S.I. 1997/2938)
- Registration of Births, Deaths and Marriages (Fees) Order 1997 (S.I. 1997/2939)
- Disqualification from Driving (Prescribed Courts) (Scotland) Order 1997 (S.I. 1997/2940)
- Invergarry-Kyle of Lochalsh Trunk Road (A87) Extension (Skye Bridge Crossing) Toll Order (Variation) Order 1997 (S.I. 1997/2941)
- Removal of Vehicles (Prescribed Charges) (Scotland) Regulations 1997 (S.I. 1997/2942)
- Child Support (Written Agreements) (Scotland) Order 1997 (S.I. 1997/2943)
- Restrictive Trade Practices (Non-notifiable Agreements) (Turnover Threshold) Amendment Order 1997 (S.I. 1997/2944)
- Restrictive Trade Practices (Non-notifiable Agreements) (Sale and Purchase, Share Subscription and Franchise Agreements) Order 1997 (S.I. 1997/2945)
- London Docklands Development Corporation (Planning Functions) Order 1997 (S.I. 1997/2946)
- Severn Bridges Tolls Order 1997 (S.I. 1997/2947)
- Dundee Teaching Hospitals National Health Service Trust (Establishment) Amendment Order 1997 (S.I. 1997/2948)
- Portland Harbour Revision Order 1997 (S.I. 1997/2949)
- A102(M) Motorway (Port Greenwich Development Connecting Roads) Scheme 1997 (S.I. 1997/2950)
- A102 Trunk Road (Port Greenwich Development Slip Roads) Order 1997 (S.I. 1997/2951)
- Local Government Changes for England (Valuation Tribunals) Regulations 1997 (S.I. 1997/2954)
- Beef Bones Regulations 1997 (S.I. 1997/2959)
- Highway Litter Clearance and Cleaning (Transfer of Responsibility) Order 1997 (S.I. 1997/2960)
- Education (Grant) (Amendment) (No. 2) Regulations 1997 (S.I. 1997/2961)
- Merchant Shipping and Fishing Vessels (Health and Safety at Work) Regulations 1997 (S.I. 1997/2962)
- Mackerel (Specified Sea Areas) (Prohibition of Fishing) Order 1997 (S.I. 1997/2963)
- Specified Risk Material Order 1997 (S.I. 1997/2964)
- Specified Risk Material Regulations 1997 (S.I. 1997/2965)
- Antarctic (Guernsey) Regulations 1997 (S.I. 1997/2966)
- Antarctic (Jersey) Regulations 1997 (S.I. 1997/2967)
- Antarctic (Isle of Man) Regulations 1997 (S.I. 1997/2968)
- Arable Area Payments (Amendment) Regulations 1997 (S.I. 1997/2969)
- Secretary of State for the Environment, Transport and the Regions Order 1997 (S.I. 1997/2971)
- European Communities (Definition of Treaties) (European Police Office) Order 1997 (S.I. 1997/2972)
- European Communities (Immunities and Privileges of the European Police Office) Order 1997 (S.I. 1997/2973)
- Falkland Islands Constitution (Amendment) (No. 2) Order 1997 (S.I. 1997/2974)
- OSPAR Commission (Immunities and Privileges) Order 1997 (S.I. 1997/2975)
- Criminal Justice Act 1988 (Designated Countries and Territories) (Amendment) (No. 2) Order 1997 (S.I. 1997/2976)
- Criminal Justice (International Co-operation) Act 1990 (Enforcement of Overseas Forfeiture Orders) (Amendment) (No. 2) Order 1997 (S.I. 1997/2977)
- Deep Sea Mining (Temporary Provisions) Act 1981 (Guernsey) Order 1997 (S.I. 1997/2978)
- Deep Sea Mining (Temporary Provisions) Act 1981 (Jersey) Order 1997 (S.I. 1997/2979)
- Drug Trafficking Act 1994 (Designated Countries and Territories) (Amendment) (No. 2) Order 1997 (S.I. 1997/2980)
- Immigration (European Economic Area) (Amendment) Order 1997 (S.I. 1997/2981)
- Summer Time Order 1997 (S.I. 1997/2982)
- Civil Evidence (Northern Ireland) Order 1997 (S.I. 1997/2983)
- Deregulation (Northern Ireland) Order 1997 (S.I. 1997/2984)
- Double Taxation Relief (Taxes on Income) (Falkland Islands) Order 1997 (S.I. 1997/2985)
- Double Taxation Relief (Taxes on Income) (Lesotho) Order 1997 (S.I. 1997/2986)
- Double Taxation Relief (Taxes on Income) (Malaysia) Order 1997 (S.I. 1997/2987)
- Double Taxation Relief (Taxes on Income) (Singapore) Order 1997 (S.I. 1997/2988)
- Aviation Security (Guernsey) Order 1997 (S.I. 1997/2989)
- National Health Service Trusts (Membership and Procedure) Amendment Regulations 1997 (S.I. 1997/2990)
- National Health Service Trusts (Membership and Procedure) Amendment Regulations 1997 (S.I. 1997/2991)

== 3001–3100 ==
- Teachers' Pensions Regulations 1997 (S.I. 1997/3001)
- Mink Keeping Order 1997 (S.I. 1997/3002)
- Non-Domestic Rating Contributions (Wales) (Amendment) Regulations 1997 (S.I. 1997/3003)
- Crime and Punishment (Scotland) Act 1997 (Commencement No. 4) Order 1997 (S.I. 1997/3004)
- Long Residential Tenancies (Supplemental Forms) Regulations 1997 (S.I. 1997/3005)
- Town and Country Planning General (Amendment) Regulations 1997 (S.I. 1997/3006)
- Rent Assessment Committees (England and Wales) (Amendment) Regulations 1997 (S.I. 1997/3007)
- Long Residential Tenancies (Principal Forms) Regulations 1997 (S.I. 1997/3008)
- Smoke Control Areas (Exempted Fireplaces) Order 1997 (S.I. 1997/3009)
- General Lighthouse Authorities (Beacons: Maritime Differential Correction Systems) Order 1997 (S.I. 1997/3016)
- Non-Domestic Rating (Chargeable Amounts) (Amendment) (No. 2) Regulations 1997 (S.I. 1997/3017)
- Merchant Shipping (Port Waste Reception Facilities) Regulations 1997 (S.I. 1997/3018)
- Channel 4 (Application of Excess Revenues) Order 1997 (S.I. 1997/3019)
- Potato Marketing Scheme (Certification of Revocation) Order 1997 (S.I. 1997/3020)
- National Health Service (Pilot Schemes: Financial Assistance for Preparatory Work) Amendment Regulations 1997 (S.I. 1997/3021)
- Merchant Shipping (ISM Code) (Ro-Ro Passenger Ferries) Regulations 1997 (S.I. 1997/3022)
- Products of Animal Origin (Import and Export) (Amendment) Regulations 1997 (S.I. 1997/3023)
- Financial Services Act 1986 (Miscellaneous Exemptions) Order 1997 (S.I. 1997/3024)
- Road Vehicles (Statutory Off-Road Notification) Regulations 1997 (S.I. 1997/3025)
- Non-Domestic Rating Contributions (England) (Amendment) Regulations 1997 (S.I. 1997/3031)
- Copyright and Rights in Databases Regulations 1997 (S.I. 1997/3032)
- Export of Goods (United Nations Sanctions) (Sierra Leone) (Amendment) Order 1997 (S.I. 1997/3033)
- Social Security (Claims and Payments) Amendment Regulations 1997 (S.I. 1997/3034)
- Non-automatic Weighing Instruments (EEC Requirements) (Amendment) Regulations 1997 (S.I. 1997/3035)
- Land Registration Act 1997 (Commencement) Order 1997 (S.I. 1997/3036)
- Land Registration Rules 1997 (S.I. 1997/3037)
- Personal and Occupational Pension Schemes (Miscellaneous Amendments) (No. 2) Regulations 1997 (S.I. 1997/3038)
- A41 Trunk Road (Camden) (Temporary Prohibition of Traffic) (No. 4) Order 1997 (S.I. 1997/3042)
- Air Quality Regulations 1997 (S.I. 1997/3043)
- Environment Act 1995 (Commencement No. 10) Order 1997 (S.I. 1997/3044)
- A205 Trunk Road (Southwark) Red Route Experimental Traffic Order 1997 (S.I. 1997/3045)
- Food (Pistachios from Iran) (Emergency Control) (Amendment) Order 1997 (S.I. 1997/3046)
- Criminal Procedure and Investigations Act 1996 (Code of Practice) (Northern Ireland) Order 1997 (S.I. 1997/3047)
- Local Government Superannuation (Scotland) Amendment (No.4) Regulations 1997 (S.I. 1997/3048)
- Homeless Persons (Priority Need) (Scotland) Order 1997 (S.I. 1997/3049)
- Wireless Telegraphy Apparatus Approval and Examination Fees Order 1997 (S.I. 1997/3050)
- Electromagnetic Compatibility (Wireless Telegraphy Apparatus) Certification and Examination Fees Regulations 1997 (S.I. 1997/3051)
- Combined Probation Areas (North Wales) Order 1997 (S.I. 1997/3052)
- Traffic Signs (Temporary Obstructions) Regulations 1997 (S.I. 1997/3053)
- Sole, etc. (Specified Sea Areas) (Prohibition of Fishing) Order 1997 (S.I. 1997/3054)
- Conservation (Natural Habitats, &c.) (Amendment) Regulations 1997 (S.I. 1997/3055)
- Road Traffic (Special Parking Area) (London Borough of Bromley) (Amendment) Order 1997 (S.I. 1997/3056)
- Road Traffic (Special Parking Area) (London Borough of Haringey) (Amendment) Order 1997 (S.I. 1997/3057)
- Road Traffic (Vehicle Emissions) (Fixed Penalty) Regulations 1997 (S.I. 1997/3058)
- Act of Sederunt (Rules of the Court of Session Amendment No. 9) (Solicitors and Notaries Public) 1997 (S.I. 1997/3059)
- Town and Country Planning (General Permitted Development) (Scotland) Amendment (No.2) Order 1997 (S.I. 1997/3060)
- Town and Country Planning (Use Classes) (Scotland) Order 1997 (S.I. 1997/3061)
- Specified Risk Material (Amendment) Regulations 1997 (S.I. 1997/3062)
- Vehicle Excise Duty (Immobilisation, Removal and Disposal of Vehicles) (Amendment) Regulations 1997 (S.I. 1997/3063)
- A205 Trunk Road (Lewisham) Red Route Experimental Traffic Order 1997 Variation Order 1997 (S.I. 1997/3066)
- Local Government (Changes for the Registration Service in Berkshire, Cambridgeshire, Cheshire, Devon, Essex, Hereford and Worcester, Kent, Lancashire, Nottinghamshire and Shropshire) Order 1997 (S.I. 1997/3067)
- Antarctic Act 1994 (Commencement) (No. 3) Order 1997 (S.I. 1997/3068)
- Criminal Legal Aid (Scotland) (Prescribed Proceedings) Regulations 1997 (S.I. 1997/3069)
- Advice and Assistance (Assistance by Way of Representation) (Scotland) Regulations 1997 (S.I. 1997/3070)

== 3101–3200 ==
- Merchant Shipping Act 1995 (Appointed Day No. 2) Order 1997 (S.I. 1997/3107)
- Criminal Procedure and Investigations Act 1996 (Appointed Day No. 7) Order 1997 (S.I. 1997/3108)
- Firearms (Amendment) (No. 2) Act 1997 (Commencement) Order 1997 (S.I. 1997/3114)

== See also ==
- List of statutory instruments of the United Kingdom
