= Architectural education in the United Kingdom =

After nearly a century of endeavour and negotiation which had been led by the Royal Institute of British Architects, a statutory Board of Architectural Education was formed under the Architects (Registration) Act 1931 (21 & 22 Geo. 5. c. 33). For the purposes of constituting the Board of Architectural Education the Act included a list of Schools of Architecture in the United Kingdom. The statutory Board was abolished in the 1990s, and when the Architects Act 1997 repealed the 1931 Act the statutory list of Schools of Architecture went with it.

The 1931 act had come to be passed at the end of a century of development in educational provision and in the method of qualifying by examination. The 1997 Act was passed in the period after the United Kingdom had become one of the Member States of the European Economic Community, later named the European Union, an organization which, among other things, has required Member States to remove obstacles to the freedom of movement and establishment in respect of professional practice, employment, trade and business within the territories of the Union.

The method of qualifying by passing an examination which the RIBA had recognized as allowing exemption continued in the period when the 1931 Act was in force, and remained available under the later legislation.

By a further development, from 2007 a Chartered Member of the RIBA may apply for the registration of a Chartered Practice in respect of a business providing architectural services and comprising one or more Chartered Members meeting criteria for, and operating in accordance with, a prescribed scheme.

== Sources ==
The historian will find some source material in the Archive which the RIBA has made accessible at the Victoria and Albert Museum, and in books, periodicals and other publications of the period which have been deposited and retained in the British Architectural Library (of the RIBA). Another contemporaneous source of information, upon which the following is largely based, is provided by two editions of the Encyclopædia Britannica, the eleventh of 1910 and the fourteenth of 1929. These editions contain articles which conveniently indicate how examination, as a method of gaining recognition for the attainment of the specialist knowledge and skill required of a professional practitioner, had grown and had been thought of in the period leading up to the passing of the 1931 Act.

== 19th century background ==
The background to the developments in education and the method of attaining professional qualification had been the unprecedented development of industrial and commercial activity in the United Kingdom and other countries in the course of the nineteenth century. This, and the impact on the working and living conditions of the populations affected, had been making demands for the building of factories, warehouses, offices, educational establishments, hospitals, housing, places of recreation and entertainment and places for religious and other purposes. With that came demands upon architectural practitioners for designs for buildings of all kinds, qualities and standards, for the supervision of the construction of works, and in some cases for making planning schemes for area development or redevelopment, of greater or lesser extent; sometimes collaborating with other branches of the construction professions, notably surveyors, civil engineers and, as the period progressed, structural engineers, and those engaged in mechanical engineering and electrical engineering. The demand for architectural services, in respect of both traditional and newer materials and techniques, was coming from public bodies, commercial and industrial enterprises, private owners or investors, philanthropists, benefactors and others.

== Institutional arrangements ==
As a result, institutional arrangements for architectural education became increasingly systematic, in respect of examinations for formal qualifications, and making qualifications a condition for granting some other form of distinguishing style or title (such as Fellow, Associate or Licentiate of a professional body), or for the right or expectation to be able to practise as an architect, on one's own account or as a partner or as an assistant in another's office.

A leading participant in the development of those institutional arrangements was the society which had been formed in London in the 1830s and had petitioned for, and in 1837 had been granted, a charter of incorporation. This society was later granted the name Royal Institute of British Architects, and is for convenience referred to as the RIBA.

== Qualifying examinations ==
The index of the eleventh edition offers users very little more about architectural education than a few words in an article on Examinations generally, which was attributed in part to Paul George Konody, Art Critic of The Observer and the Daily Mail, formerly Editor of The Artist and Journal of Home Culture, author of the Art of Walter Crane; Velázquez, Life and Work; etc., and in part to Arthur Watson, Secretary in the Academic Department of the University of London. It began with the paragraph:

The term 'examination' (i.e., inspecting, weighing and testing; from Latin examen, the tongue of a balance) is used [in the article which followed] to denote a systematic test of knowledge, and of either special or general capacity or fitness, carried out under the authority of some public body.

There followed eight sections beginning with History and ending with a critical appraisal headed The Object and Efficiency of Examinations, and their Indirect Effects. The second section was on Professional Examinations, followed by others on School-leaving Examinations, mentioning the "accrediting" system in the United States started by the University of Michigan in 1871; Methods of Examination: Written, Oral, Thesis and Practical; Competitive Examinations; The Organization and Conduct of Examinations; and Marking, Classification and Errors of Detail.

== Perspective ==
The section on History began as follows:

The oldest known system of examinations in history is that used by China for the selection of officers for the public service (c.1115 B.C.), and the periodic tests which they undergo after entry (c.2200). The abolition of this system was announced in 1906, and, as a partial substitute, it was decided to hold an annual examination in Peking of Chinese educated abroad.

The majority of examinations in western countries are derived from the university examinations of the middle ages. The first universities of Europe consisted of corporations of teachers and of students analogous to the trade gilds and merchant gilds of the time. In the trade gilds there were apprentices, companions and masters. No one was admitted to mastership until he had served his apprenticeship, nor, as a rule, until he had shown that he could accomplish a piece of work to the satisfaction of the gild.

The object of the universities was to teach; and to the three classes established by the gild correspond roughly to the scholar, the bachelor or pupil-teacher, and the master or doctor (two terms at first equivalent) who, having first served his apprenticeship and passed a definite technical test, had received permission to teach...

After a survey of the development of examination practice in the universities of western Europe up to the early 20c., the next section of professional examinations began with the remark "University examinations for degrees having ceased to be used as technical tests of teaching capacity, new examinations have been devised for this purpose". For examinations in Medicine, the article referred the reader to the article on Medical Education, and this section concluded with a single paragraph headed Other Professions, stating that a system of professional examinations carried on by other professional bodies, in some cases with legal sanction, was developed in England during the nineteenth century; and, in a list of subjects described as "the most important" mentioned "architecture (Royal Institute of British Architects )", along with: accountancy, actuarial work, music, pharmacy, plumbing, surveying, veterinary medicine, technical subjects, e.g. cotton-spinning, dyeing, motor manufacturing, commercial subjects, shorthand and engineering (civil, mechanical and electrical).

== As of 1929 ==
Publication of the fourteenth edition of the Encyclopædia Britannica in 1929 happened shortly before the Board of Architectural Education was constituted under the Act of 1931. In it there was an article three pages long on Architectural Education, attributed to Lionel Bailey Budden, MA, ARIBA, Associate Professor of Architecture in the University of Liverpool. The opening sentence was:

Underlying the system of architectural education at present established in most Western countries is the assumption that architecture is one of the fine arts, and that the prime object of the training which the architect should receive is to equip him as a creative artist in building.

That could be compared with the words of the charter which had been granted to the RIBA in 1837, in which the purpose of the Institute was described as:

... for the general advancement of Civil Architecture, and for promoting and facilitating the acquirement of the knowledge of the various arts and sciences connected therewith; it being an art esteemed and encouraged in all enlightened nations, as tending greatly to promote the domestic convenience of citizens, and the public improvement and embellishment of towns and cities...

When the present supplemental charter was granted in 1971, part of the first charter was revoked but the words quoted were retained.

In the meantime Professor Budden's article of 1929 included the following:

... it is generally agreed that the study of architecture should be preceded by a liberal education. As one of the fine arts, historically associated with the arts of painting and sculpture, and as the background of civilized society, it demands both for its practice and its appreciation some measure of general culture. The tendency today [1929] is, therefore, for schools of architecture in Europe, the British Empire and America to require from candidates for admission evidence of a broad non-technical education... Today architectural education in all countries is in the hands of practising teachers. Direct connection between the instruction given in the school and the experience of actual practice is thereby assured ...

The article then considered: Italy, France, Great Britain and Dominions, Other European Countries, United States, and Mexico. It mentioned that the largest school of architecture in England was that of the Architectural Association (London) and the next that of Liverpool University, and explained the part played by the RIBA:

From its foundation in 1835 the Royal Institute of British Architects has been the supreme controlling authority of the profession throughout the empire. At no time, however, has the RIBA itself undertaken the teaching of architecture. But by setting up, in the latter half of the last century [19c.], a centralized system of examinations when no professional tests existed in the country, it performed a notable service in raising the general level of professional knowledge. Through its board of architectural education it has now delegated to certain approved schools the task of qualifying candidates for admission to the institute, only maintaining its own centralized examinations for students not seeking entry through scholastic channels.

Schools of architecture which were then recognized for exemption from the RIBA final examination (except in the subject of "Professional Practice") were named as:

Robert Gordon's Colleges, Aberdeen; Edinburgh College of Art; Royal Technical College, Glasgow; University of Liverpool; Architectural Association, London; University of London; University of Manchester; McGill University, Montreal; and the University of Sydney.

Schools in certain institutions which were then recognized for exemption from the RIBA intermediate examination were named as:

School of Art, Birmingham; Royal West of England Academy, Bristol; University of Cambridge; Technical College, Cardiff; Leeds College of Arts; Leicester College of Arts and Crafts; Northern Polytechnic, London; Armstrong College, Newcastle-on-Tyne; University of Sheffield; Municipal School of Arts and Crafts, Southend-on-Sea; University of Toronto; and Sir J. J. School of Art, Bombay.

It was mentioned that in both classes the maintenance of the requisite standard was assured by the periodic inspection of the visiting board, appointed by the RIBA board of architectural education, which reported to the institute on the work of the various schools granted or applying for exemption.

The system continued after the statutory Board of Architectural Education had been constituted, in connection with the provision in the Architects (Registration) Act, 1931 making it the duty of the Board to recommend "the recognition of any examinations in architecture the passing of which ought, in the opinion of the Board, to qualify persons for registration" under the Act (subsection 5(2)(a)).

Consonant with Professor Budden's remarks at that time, the objects of the RIBA are declared in its charter to be:

The advancement of architecture and the promotion of the acquirement of the knowledge of the Arts and Sciences connected therewith;

and the next paragraph in the charter expresses the power of the RIBA to grant diplomas, certificates or other forms of recognition.

== Later developments ==
The former division of the membership of the RIBA into the two classes of Fellows and Associates ceased under the supplemental charter and byelaws of 1971, but the method of qualifying by passing an examination which the RIBA has recognized as allowing exemption remains available. To be eligible for election to the now undivided class of Chartered Members a candidate is still required to have undertaken courses of study and passed examinations which have been prescribed or recognized by the Council, or to be able to demonstrate to the satisfaction of the Council having had a proper training in architecture.

As the field in which architecture is practised has continued to change, so has the RIBA Chartered Membership been keeping pace. In recent years a Byelaw was introduced to the effect that practising members are responsible for undertaking continuing professional development, defined in the Byelaws as:

The systematic improvement and broadening of knowledge and skill and the development of personal qualities necessary for the execution of professional and technical duties in the course of a Chartered Member's working life.

A further and more recent development has been the passing of a Byelaw allowing a Chartered Member to apply for the registration of a Chartered Practice, defined in the Byelaws as:

a formally-established business providing architectural services and comprising one or more Chartered Members which meets criteria for, and operates in accordance with, a scheme prescribed by the Council, or a board to which the Council has devolved responsibility.

== Further information ==
Professor Budden's article in the fourteenth edition of the Encyclopædia Britannica (1929) was published shortly before the passing of the Architects (Registration) Act, 1931 of the Architects (Registration) Acts, 1931 to 1938. His School, Liverpool, was one of those listed in the Act for the purpose of constituting the statutory Board of Architectural Education. When he contributed the article he was Associate Professor in Architecture in the Liverpool University School of Architecture, becoming Roscoe Professor from 1933. He retired in 1952. He had entered the School in 1905, graduated BA in 1909 and MA in 1910, teaching there from 1911 and becoming Associate Professor in 1924. He had been University of Liverpool travelling Scholar in Architecture in 1909, and a student at the British School at Athens 1909-1912. He was first an Associate of the Royal Institute of British Architects (ARIBA), later becoming a Fellow (FRIBA). His architectural work included extensions to Liverpool University Students’ Union.

For further details of the development, in that period, of the policy of the RIBA for architectural education and qualification see 'Statutory Registration – chronology of key events' in Architects Registration in the United Kingdom, and for opposition to the system of registration which was proposed and promoted by successive Bills in Parliament see William H. White, Thomas Graham Jackson and John Alfred Gotch.

== See also ==
- Board of Architectural Education
- Schools of Architecture, Architects (Registration) Act, 1931
- A History of Architecture on the Comparative Method. For this standard reference work, first published in 1896, with a major revision for the 6th edition published in 1921, which became a staple for architectural education, see article on Sir Banister Fletcher. Of the 6th edition J. Mordaunt Crook remarked that it concentrated ‘on supplying an epitomised history of world architecture’ such that ‘Fletcher turned a useful handbook into a veritable student’s bible.’
- On the emergence of Town and country planning in the United Kingdom as a topic for architectural education and practice resulting from urban and industrial expansion in 19c., see Raymond Unwin's Warburton lecture, 1912, The Town Extension Plan.
