= Register of Architects =

From 1932 there has been a statutory Register of Architects under legislation of the United Kingdom Parliament originally enacted in 1931. The originating Act contained ancillary provisions for entering an architect’s name in the register and removing a name from it which later legislation has amended. The 1931 Act gave it the name “the Register of Registered Architects”, but by an Act of 1938 the name was changed to “the Register of Architects”.

Entry in the Register has always been upon voluntary application but subject to payment of an annual retention fee, and the legislation has always required the registration body to publish the current version of the Register annually.

The setting up of the Register had been the result of many years of negotiation by the Royal Institute of British Architects (RIBA), the leading professional society for practising architects in the United Kingdom, which had been incorporated by charter granted by William IV in 1837.

Maintenance of the Register of Architects is the responsibility of a body corporate which, from July 1997, has the statutory name "Architects Registration Board". This body is regarded as a non-departmental public body by the United Kingdom Government and it is liable to judicial review in the Administrative Court of the High Court in England.

== Consultation on reform ==
The identity of the Register of Architects itself has continued unchanged, but under later primary legislation (of 1996/1997) some of the administrative or ancillary provisions were abolished, and some were altered having regard, among other things, to the use of data in electronic form in connection with maintenance of the Register and its annual publication. This happened after the Department of the Environment had issued a consultation document with the title “Reform of Architects Registration” in 1994, followed by the government introducing an amending bill in Parliament in 1996.

One of the alterations was that the name which had been given by the originating Act of 1931 to the body constituted as the proprietor and publisher of the Register was changed from the Architects' Registration Council of the United Kingdom (ARCUK) to the Architects Registration Board (ARB), with effect from 21 July 1997.

== Legislation ==
As an aid to statutory interpretation, the following summarises the series of enactments governing the Register from 1931 to 1997. The legislation at the time of the passing of the Architects Act 1997 (19 March) had been the Architects Registration Acts 1931 to 1996, namely,

- the Architects (Registration) Act 1931 (21 & 22 Geo. 5. c. 33);
- the Architects Registration Act 1938;
- Part III of the Housing Grants, Construction and Regeneration Act 1996, including, by section 125(1), the intricate tracery of amendments, transitional provisions and savings listed in Parts II and III of Schedule 2.

The legislation at the time of the passing of the 1996 act (24 July) had been the Architects Registration Acts 1931 to 1969.

When the consolidation act of 1997 which replaced the previous legislation was enacted the name of the proprietary body with the statutory duty to publish the Register of Architects was the Architects’ Registration Council of the United Kingdom. From 21 July 1997 when the 1997 Act took effect, the name of this body has been the Architects Registration Board, but that change of name did not change the identity of the Register of Architects itself, which has been in continuous existence from its inception under the originating Act of 1931.

Amendments to the 1997 Act made in June 2008 by statutory instrument established rules for the recognition of professional qualifications enabling migrants from the European Economic Area or Switzerland to register as architects in the United Kingdom. It also set out provisions for facilitating temporary and occasional professional services cross-border.

== Copies of the Register ==
The Register was first defined as the Register kept in pursuance of the 1931 Act. Hard bound copies of the series of annual versions of the Register, from volume 1 for the year 1933 onwards, are made available for reference to members of the public at the British Architectural Library of the Royal Institute of British Architects, London. Some hiatus on the part of the Board in producing printed copies of the Register in accordance with the legislation and the Board's previous practice has latterly impeded the continuation of the series for reference in that way. The Board's current website offers only a downloadable pdf. format.

The provision of copies of the Register annually was a requirement imposed on the registration body itself under the originating and later legislation. Under present legislation, subsections (1) to (5) of section 3 of the Architects Act 1997 require: _the Board to publish the current version of the Register annually; _a copy of the most recently published version to be provided to any person who requests one on payment of a reasonable charge decided by the Board; and _a copy of the Register purporting to be published by the Board to be evidence (in Scotland, sufficient evidence) of any matter mentioned in it. These provisions can be traced to section 3 of the originating Act of 1931 (21 & 22 Geo. 5. Ch.33)

The importance of such annual versions of the Register being available is seen (inter alia) in connection with the restrictions, and the liability to criminal process for infringement, under sections 20 and 21 of the 1997 Act.

The five subsections of section 3 of the 1997 Act are as follows: (1) The Registrar shall maintain the Register of Architects in which there shall be entered the name of every person entitled to be registered under this Act. (2) The Register shall show the regular business address of each registered person. (3) The Registrar shall make any necessary alterations to the Register and, in particular, shall remove from the Register the name of any registered person who has died or has applied in the prescribed manner requesting the removal of his name. (4) The Board shall publish the current version of the Register annually and a copy of the most recently published version shall be provided to any person who requests one on payment of a reasonable charge decided by the Board. (5) A copy of the Register purporting to be published by the Board shall be evidence (and, in Scotland, sufficient evidence) of any matter mentioned in it.

Section 3 derives from section 5A (which had been inserted in the previous legislation by the Act of 1996, to modify s.3(4) of the originating legislation in connection with the new statutory provision for the Board to appoint a person as 'the Registrar').

== Online facility as service for registered persons ==
There appears to be no provision in the legislation authorising the Board or Registrar to offer to registered persons as such any service, whether for the purpose of claiming a commercially competitive advantage or otherwise. But a communication of May 2012 (issue 34 of ebulletin) addressed to registered persons announced a 'new and enhanced' version of the online Register, stating that by this resource '...every [registered] architect now has their own web page. This offers a number of opportunities for you. You can create a link with your own website so that your clients can see at a glance that you are a genuine, registered architect. By using the online facility to update your own details, you can also add your contact details, including your email and website addresses, to give your clients and potential clients immediate access to your services. The best way to demonstrate your registered status is to use ARB’s logo. You can download this to add to your website, business stationery and signage. The new online Register and downloadable logo create an ideal platform for you to demonstrate your professionalism not only to members of the public but also to your non-registered and possibly unqualified competitors in the marketplace.' The communication ended by expressing the hope that as many registered persons as possible would use this opportunity for increasing their profile with the public.

== Further information ==
See articles listed on the Categories page for further information about:

- Architects (Registration) Acts, 1931 to 1938
- Architects Act 1997
- Architects Registration Board
- Architects Registration in the United Kingdom
- Architects' Registration Council of the United Kingdom
- Architectural education in the United Kingdom (19c-20c)
- Board of Architectural Education
- Housing Grants, Construction and Regeneration Act 1996
- Reform of Architects Registration
- Schools of Architecture, Architects (Registration) Act, 1931
