= Reform of Architects Registration =

"Reform of Architects Registration" was the title of a UK government consultation paper dated 19 July 1994 which was issued by the Department of the Environment. The introduction stated that in October 1993 the Government had announced that the profession and others would be consulted about measures which could be taken to simplify the then arrangements for the registration of architects under the Architects Registration Acts, and that broad agreement on what those measures would be had been reached with the Architects' Registration Council of the United Kingdom (ARCUK) and the Royal Institute of British Architects (RIBA). Eventually, Parliament made certain changes to the Architects Registration Acts which now have effect under the Architects Act 1997.

The consultation paper went on to state that the current proposals for reform stemmed from a request from ARCUK to the Government in 1992 that the Architects Registration Acts should be reviewed; and that a review had been carried out by Mr E J D Warne CB, whose report had been published by HMSO in 1993.

The consultation paper mentioned that the Warne Report had considered the views of architects, architectural bodies and consumers and "agreed with ARCUK" that there were certain weaknesses of its structure: and that the reforms being proposed were aimed at overcoming those weaknesses in a way that would be generally acceptable to the profession and public alike.

The main objective of the reforms was stated to be:

to create a small, focussed and effective registration body which represents the interests of both the profession and the general public,

and its purpose would be to

set criteria for admission to the Register; prevent misuse of the title 'architect'; discipline unprofessional conduct, and set fee levels.

The punctuation in the document, as reproduced above, seemed to indicate a close connection of some kind between setting fee levels and professional conduct. But in the event the setting of fee levels was later abandoned, while, in respect of professional conduct, statutory powers to inflict fines expressly on a par with criminal penalties were given to a body which would have persons who are not themselves members of the profession in the decisive majority, and who would not be acting under the judicial oath of a judge or a magistrate in a court of criminal or civil jurisdiction, or pursuant to the consensual jurisdiction of an arbitrator, and would not necessarily have the appropriate skill and knowledge to be able to act competently and fairly in respect of hazarding an architect's professional reputation. This could have been seen as an objectionable aberration, but that instead a preponderance of political opinion welcomed such an arrangement, regarding it as a pioneering development, may be explained at least in part by observing that the usage "stakeholders" had gained some currency at the time.

Certain issues had been the background to the Warne Report as matters were in the 1990s and had always been, namely, issues concerning the flaws or merits of the case for or against such proposals in theory or in principle or in relation particularly, on the one hand, to the Register of Architects, to restrictions on the use of the word "architect", and to the practice of architecture considered as an art or as a business or as a means of earning a livelihood; and on the other hand, to official accountability, juridical norms and the rule of law: see further, article on Architects Registration in the United Kingdom - background to legislation.

One of the proposals mentioned in the consultation document which were later enacted and are now operative was that ARCUK would remain as a legal entity, but its name would be changed to "Architects Registration Board"; and it was stated that although this change, in itself, would have no impact on the status or role of ARCUK it would suggest a smaller, tighter body and would mark the alterations to ARCUK's functions.

Another of the proposals was that there should be an office of Registrar whose functions would be to maintain the Register and carry out the instructions of the Board; and it was stated that the Registrar would be a named appointee of the Board which would decide whether the Registrar should be an employee or a contractor.

== See also ==
- The Architects (Registration) Acts, 1931 to 1938

Extent and citation of the Acts
Formation and duties of ARCUK
Architects Act 1997
Regulations and rules
Penal restriction.

- Board of Architectural Education

Nomination and appointment
Statutory nomenclature.

- ARCUK, Architects' Registration Council of the United Kingdom

Use of title
Background to legislation, cc19-20

Three aspects
1931 regime
From 1990s
Chronology 1834-1997

The present legislation

Summary of legislative history
The "burdens" and "choices"
Side effects
Membership of the Board
Duties of the Board

"Architecture" and "architectural services"

- Architects Registration Board

Links to the Architects Act 1997
- Main Customs Office (Munich)
