= Directive 2005/36/EC =

Directive 2005/36/EC on the recognition of professional qualifications provides for a system of recognition of professional experience and promotes automatic recognition of professional experience across the European Union (EU). It covers the European Economic Area and has been amended several times.

The qualifications of some professions, such as doctors and architects, have been extensively harmonised; in addition, it offers more general guidelines for other professions, that have not been specifically regulated this directive, or other specific rules. Any form of work that would normally be restricted in a member state to people who had gained a professional qualification in that member state are also open to nationals of the EU (and member states of the European Economic Area) who have gained a similar professional qualification in another member state.

Professions regulated in most or all EU states include:

Accountancy
British-qualified accountants (Chartered Certified Accountant (ACCA) or Chartered Accountant (ACA or CA) or International Accountant (AIA) in the United Kingdom (UK)
Engineering
Chartered Engineer or EUR ING (European Engineer), Incorporated Engineer (UK), corporate membership of a UK professional engineering institution such as Member of the Institution of Engineering and Technology
Teaching
Teachers (qualified teacher status in the UK)
Law
Lawyers (barristers, solicitors and advocates in the UK).

== Architects Regulations 2008 ==
Architects (Recognition of European Qualifications etc and Saving and Transitional Provision) Regulations 2008 (Note: Section 1.)
- Statutory Instrument
- Parliament of the United Kingdom
- Citation: SI 2008/1331

Dates
- Made: 19 May 2008
- Laid before Parliament: 27 May 2008
- Commencement: 20 June 2008
Other legislation
Amends	Architects Act 1997
Made under	European Communities Act 1972

Status: Amended

Text of statute as originally enacted

Text of the Architects (Recognition of European Qualifications etc and Saving and Transitional Provision) Regulations 2008 as in force today (including any amendments) within the United Kingdom, from legislation.gov.uk.

The Architects Act 1997 was amended in 2008 by a statutory instrument made by a minister of the United Kingdom government under the European Communities Act 1972. This was the Architects (Recognition of European Qualifications etc and Saving and Transitional Provision) Regulations 2008 (SI 2008/1331), which came into force on 20 June 2008. An explanatory memorandum was issued with the regulations and a fuller Explanatory Memorandum presented to Parliament.

The Architects Act 1997 had resulted from the policy of allowing certain restrictions to apply (for well over 60 years, in the United Kingdom) to the use of the simple word "architect" in connection with a statutory Register of Architects operated under Westminster primary legislation by which the executant body was renamed as the Architects Registration Board from 1997 (previously the Architects' Registration Council of the United Kingdom). The amendment (under the European Communities Act 1972) has introduced pages of complicated text to a piece of legislation which was otherwise tolerably trim, neat and comprehensible in its consolidated form in the Architects Act 1997. But the amendment has been made pursuant to Directive 2005/36/EC made in 2005 and the treaty obligations binding upon the United Kingdom and other states of the European Union, and in that respect an amendment under the European Directive was inevitable.

=== Non-departmental public body ===
The Architects Registration Board has been assigned the function of the "competent authority" which has to be designated by every European Union state. It has been classed as a "non-departmental public body" in the language being used by government departments. The majority of the Board is appointed by one such government department under the provisions of the Architects Act 1997.

=== Impact ===
In connection with architects registration in the United Kingdom it is likely that as a result of the amendment of 2008 there will be a commensurate need to expand the human and other resources employed for giving effect to the additional activity prescribed for the Architects Registration Board to perform; and that the impact upon the annual fee which the Architects Act 1997 enables the board to demand is unlikely to be favourable to architects in the United Kingdom who, by application or retention, choose to become registrants on what, by the amendment, has become "Part 1" of the register. The general effect on teaching and practice, or on the inter-disciplinary process in the service of the built environment, is uncertain. Independent observers may consider (as had the author of the Warne Report, concerning the reform of architects registration which preceded the amending legislation of 1996) that the public is best served by means of statutory regulations of universal application (such as Building Regulations) on the one hand and arrangements free from the taint of monopoly on the other (for which see the article on the Warne Report and the legislative changes concerning trade descriptions and consumer protection, introduced in May 2008, that are referred to in the article on Architects Registration in the United Kingdom).

== See also ==
- European Chemist
- European Engineer
- European Qualifications Framework
- Homologation
- Incorporated Engineer
