= Schools of Architecture (United Kingdom) =

For the purposes of the statutory Board of Architectural Education, the Schools of Architecture were those listed in the second schedule to the Architects (Registration) Act 1931 (21 & 22 Geo. 5. c. 33). The 1931 act had required the Board of Architectural Education to be appointed annually by the Architects' Registration Council of the United Kingdom (ARCUK) ("the Council"). The board was to be constituted in accordance with the Second Schedule to the Act. This included a list of twenty Schools, from the Liverpool School of Architecture to the School of Architecture of the Architectural Association London.

Changes first enacted as Part III of the Housing Grants, Construction and Regeneration Act 1996 included abolition of the statutory Board of Architectural Education, and renaming the Architects' Registration Council of the United Kingdom (ARCUK) with the name it now has: the Architects Registration Board (ARB). From 1997 this body has been governed by the Architects Act 1997, which makes no mention of the Schools of Architecture.

The Housing Grants, Construction and Regeneration Act 1996 had been passed on 24 July 1996. Its long title shows that it was a piece of departmental omnibus legislation:

An Act to make provision for grants and other assistance for housing purposes and about action in relation to unfit housing; to amend the law relating to construction contracts and architects; to provide grants and other assistance for regeneration and development and in connection with clearance areas; to amend the provisions relating to home energy efficiency schemes; to make provision in connection with the dissolution of urban corporations, housing action trusts and the Commission for New Towns; and for connected purposes.

Part III of the Act relating to architects was repealed and reenacted as part of the Architects Act 1997, which was passed on 19 March 1997 under the Parliamentary rules for consolidating Acts.
