= Lionel Bailey Budden =

English architect

Lionel Bailey Budden FRIBA (1887, West Derby, Liverpool – 21 July 1956, Wirral Peninsula, Cheshire) was an English architect.

Born to William Budden and Elizabeth Adams, Budden attended Merchant Taylors' School, Crosby. From 1933 Budden was Roscoe Professor in Architecture in the Liverpool University School of Architecture. He retired in 1952.

He had entered the School in 1905, graduated BA in 1909 and MA in 1910, taught there from 1911 and became Associate Professor in 1924. It was while he was Associate Professor that he contributed the article on Architectural Education to the fourteenth edition of the Encyclopædia Britannica (1929).

He had been University of Liverpool travelling Scholar in Architecture in 1909, and a student at the British School at Athens 1909-1912. He was first an Associate of the Royal Institute of British Architects (ARIBA), later becoming a Fellow (FRIBA). His architectural work included Birkenhead War Memorial and Liverpool Cenotaph; Liverpool Veterinary Hospital and extensions to Liverpool University Students’ Union.

In 1921 he married Dora Magdalene "Maud" Fraser, later known as the creator of Curly Wee, a comic strip for children which ran in the Liverpool Echo and other newspapers globally between 1937-1967.

Lionel and Maud had a son, the opera scholar Julian Budden.

For his Encyclopædia Britannica article, published shortly before the passing of the Architects (Registration) Act, 1931 see: Architectural education in the United Kingdom (19c-20c). His School, Liverpool, was one of those listed in the Act for the purpose of constituting the statutory Board of Architectural Education.
