= Registration of architects in the United Kingdom =

In the United Kingdom, the Architects Act 1997 imposes restrictions on the use of the name, style or title "architect" in connection with a business or a professional practice, and for that purpose requires a statutory Register of Architects to be maintained. The Architects Registration Board constituted under the Act is responsible for Architects Registration in the United Kingdom and is required to publish the current version of the Register annually. Every person who is entitled to be registered under the Act has the right to be entered in the register. The act consolidated previous enactments originating with the Architects (Registration) Act 1931 (21 & 22 Geo. 5. c. 33) as amended by the Architects Registration Act 1938. It applies to England, Wales, Scotland and Northern Ireland.

Section 2 of the act prescribes that the board shall appoint and regulate the functions ascribed to the Registrar. The Act refers to the Registrar by the masculine pronoun in the singular, but by the usual rules of statutory interpretation, this is not limited to an individual male person.

An amendment under the European Communities Act 1972 came into force on 20 June 2008.

The recurring controversy about whether statutory protection of title serves useful purposes has been intensified by the legislative impact of the EU Directive on Unfair Commercial Practices implemented in May 2008 by two Statutory Instruments under the European Communities Act 1972, namely No 1276 (Trade Descriptions) and No 1277 (Consumer Protection).

For the purposes of the Legislative and Regulatory Reform Act 2006, "regulatory function" is defined in subsection 32(2).

== Use of the title "architect" ==
Under subsection 20(1) of the Architects Act 1997, a person in the United Kingdom may only practise or carry on business under any name, style or title containing the word "architect" if registered. There is no restriction on its use in any other circumstance. The words in the current Act follow those of the 1938 Architects Registration Act under which it was decided that the use of the suffix "FRIBA" in business notepaper constituted an infringement.

By subsection 20(3) corporate bodies, firms or partnerships can carry on business under a name, style or title containing the word "architect" provided that (in broad terms) the architectural business is run by a registered person. However the statutory registration Board may (by rules made under subsection 20(4) – see General Rules, Rule 25) effectively limit the application of subsection 20(3) to those corporate bodies firms or partnerships who have supplied information necessary for determining whether the architectural business is run by a registered person.

The rule-making power under subsection 20(4) appears to be limited to prescribing particular information to be provided to the Board viz. "such information necessary for statutory registration determining whether [subsection 20(3)] applies". The subsection makes no provision for levying any fee.

== Background to legislation ==
=== Up to the 1990s ===
Opinions had been divided for well over a century about the merits of statutory registration of architects in the United Kingdom. The result was that Parliament, as the legislator and guided by the government of the day, has had to maintain a state of benevolent neutrality among the holders of these contending views, consistent with more general public policies for business competition, employment, professional education and so on. In relation to statutory protection of title, three aspects of the field in which architects practise invite examination. In summary:

- The design quality of the built environment: this is essentially a cultural concern which was and remains one of the principal reasons for the formation and continuance of the Royal Institute of British Architects as a chartered body. It has connotations not only for the United Kingdom but world wide. It is beyond the ambit of statutory protection of title.
- The technical sufficiency of buildings: the public interest is secured in the United Kingdom under Building Regulations and other enactments. This too is beyond the statutory protection of the title "architect".
- The business of architectural practice: contracts of engagement for professional services are always between a business entity (whether individual, firm, partnership, or company) and the client, and are governed by the general law, including consumer protection legislation where applicable. Protection of the title 'architect' for business entities is of no practical relevance for securing the performance of architectural services.

In the light of experience since the inception of the Register under the 1931 Act, and more particularly under the Architects Registration Board’s regime from 1997, the recurring question has been whether protection of title serves useful purposes in respect of the three aspects mentioned above. The question of obsolescence has been further intensified by the EU Unfair Commercial Practices Directive, effective from 2007.

Statutory registration had its origin within the architectural profession in the latter part of the nineteenth century. It was then (as now) a matter of controversy. However, by 1905 the RIBA had established a policy to secure satisfactory training of architects by statutory means.

The basis of the policy (on registration) had always been that the profession was governed by voluntary associations of practising architects and that the profession would retain control of registration. This was reflected in the composition of the registration body (the Architects' Registration Council of the United Kingdom – ARCUK) established by the 1931 Act. Shortly after, in the book published on occasion of the Institute's centenary celebration in 1934, in the concluding paragraphs of the chapter on statutory registration., Harry Barnes FRIBA., Chairman of the Registration Committee, wrote:

... I do not conceive the purpose of the Registration Act to be that of protecting the Architectural profession. The interests of the Profession are of course legitimate but are best served by the Architectural Associations in which some 80 per cent of those practising architecture are to be found.

The object of the Registration Act is to ensure to the public that the architects they employ possess capacity and character.

Under the purview of the Board of Architectural Education no one will enjoy the title of 'Registered Architect' without giving evidence of his capacity, and under that of the Discipline Committee no one will retain the title whose character has been weighed in the balance and found wanting.

The Architects' Registration Council of the United Kingdom can never, therefore, on this view be a rival of any Architectural Association and least of all of the Royal Institute of British Architects.

The Architects' Registration Council stands at the gateway of the realm of Architectural practice, but within that realm the affairs of the Architect are best administered by those voluntary Associations to which he has allied himself and over the actions of which he has complete control.

After more than half a century times have changed and a regime of quite another kind has been installed under the 1997 Act.

=== From the 1990s ===
By the 1990s it was almost universally accepted that the time had come to bring the statutory Architects' Registration Council as it then was to an end. Opinion within the profession was divided among those who held that statutory registration should be discontinued altogether and those who held that the registration body should be reconstituted.

In the event the body was reconstituted as the Architects Registration Board (1996/1997 Acts). But it was only after the event that many in the profession came to appreciate the effect of the new requirement that the majority of the Board should be non-architects and appointed by the government, as the following quotation shows:

Crucially, professional control of the Register was taken away by the government's decision which was realised in the 1996/97 Act. This had not been generally expected by those of the membership who before then had been in favour of continuing protection of the title 'architect'. The significance and effect of the change is now becoming more widely understood. (Report of the Royal Institute of British Architects Council's Task Group on the Architects Registration Board, September 2004.)

=== Statutory registration – chronology of key events ===
1834 – The body which was to become the Royal Institute of British Architects (originally known as the Institute of British Architects in London) was formed by Thomas de Grey, 2nd Earl de Grey and several prominent architects. (After the grant of the charter it had become known as the Royal Institute of British Architects in London, eventually dropping the reference to London in 1892.)

1837 – It was granted its royal charter under William IV.

1884 – Society of Architects formed, after a campaign by a group of ARIBA to be allowed to vote on RIBA affairs had been resisted by FRIBA.

1887 – Architects and Engineers Registration Act Committee formed as an independent committee to promote a bill for registration of architects, engineers and surveyors. The bill was withdrawn after chief bodies representing engineers petitioned against it.

1889 and 1891 – Architects Registration Bill Committee put forward bills for registration of architects, which were strongly supported by the Society of Architects but opposed by an independent group of prominent architects and artists.

1892 – Papers published, defining the profession of architecture:

Norman Shaw and T G Jackson (eds.), "Architecture, A Profession or an Art".
William H White, "The Architect and his artists, an essay to assist the public in considering the question is architecture a profession or an art".

1902 – Architects Registration Bill Committee amalgamated with the Society of Architects as a joint Registration Committee.

1905 – RIBA Education Policy was adopted for statutory powers to secure satisfactory training for architects by way of registration of title, by and through the RIBA.

1908 – RIBA Licentiate Class formed, for architects who could show evidence of competence, without exams. On closure in 1913, over 2000 had been accepted.

1924–1959 – RIBA Standing Registration Committee.

1925 – Amalgamation of RIBA and Society of Architects: most of the Society of Architects members transferred to Licentiate class, which was reopened.

1927 – RIBA Registration Committee has draft bill introduced in Parliament, but opposed by the Incorporated Association of Architects and Surveyors and the Faculty of Architects and Surveyors.

1931 – Bill recast and enacted as the Architects (Registration) Act 1931, enabling the Register of Architects to be established under a statutory body called the Architects' Registration Council of the United Kingdom (ARCUK). The Council was to be made up of representatives of all architectural bodies in the United Kingdom in proportion to the numbers of their memberships on the Register, and representatives from government departments and related professional bodies. Under ARCUK, the RIBA system of exams etc. was accepted for registration. (The provisions of the Act constituting the Board of Architectural Education were repealed when ARCUK was reconstituted as ARB in 1996/7.)

1937 – A letter is sent by "the president of the council" [sic] to the Institute of Chartered Surveyors recognizing the fact that there was nothing in the Bill which the council was then promoting (and which subsequently became the Architects Registration Act 1938) to interfere with the activities of registered architects. The letter is mentioned by Lord Goddard, Lord Chief Justice, in the course of his judgment in the Queen's Bench Divisional Court in 1957 allowing the appeal of an architect (Hughes) against a professional misconduct decision of the Discipline Committee of ARCUK (later renamed Architects Registration Board), a case which becomes cited in later cases and in legal text-books as a judicial precedent.

1938 – The Architects Registration Act 1938 changed the protected title from "Registered Architect" to "Architect".

1957 – Resulting from the 1938 legislation, an appeal by an architect against ARCUK is allowed by the High Court in a case which becomes a judicial precedent, Hughes v. Architects' Registration Council of the United Kingdom: "It is not of itself disgraceful to disagree with a majority view and to act accordingly. It is only if a man has bound himself in honour to accept that view and to act according to the code that a deliberate breach of the code for his own profit can be called disgraceful."—Devlin J. (Patrick Devlin, Baron Devlin)

1992 – Government, in response to a request from ARCUK, commissioned review of the Architects Registration Acts by an independent assessor (John Warne).

1993 – Warne Report published – principal recommendation: abolition of protection of title "architect" and disbanding of ARCUK. RIBA Council initially supported this recommendation, but this was resisted by the RIBA membership. As a result RIBA campaigned for the retention of protection of title with a "stream-lined" registration board.

1996 – Part III of Housing Grants, Construction and Regeneration Act 1996, among other things, reconstituted the registration body as the Architects Registration Board (ARB).

1997 – Architects Act 1997, a consolidating act, brought together the provisions of Part III of the 1996 act and previous registration legislation. The Architects Registration Board then established with a majority of appointed lay members and a minority of elected Architect members.

2008 – Amendments made in June 2008 by Statutory Instrument established rules for the recognition of professional qualifications enabling migrants from the European Economic Area or Switzerland to register as architects in the United Kingdom. It also set out provisions for facilitating temporary and occasional professional services cross-border.

== The present legislation ==
=== Summary of legislative history ===
The following analysis of the operative and other parts of the Architects Act 1997 as it was before the amendment of June 2008 pays attention to details which sometimes go unnoticed.

The Act is fairly short. That is partly due to its conciseness, but this quality makes it all the more necessary to remember that the Act must be read as a whole to ascertain the meaning and effect of its various parts. Care is needed not to read into it what is not there (whatever conventional wisdom may have supposed or desired), and not to fail to notice what actually is there. In particular, like many such Acts, it can be better understood by looking at its beginning (Arrangement of Sections and long title) and its end (derivations), as well as the operative part in between.

Its long title is "An Act to consolidate the enactments relating to architects". The Table of Derivations printed at the end lists the enactments which it consolidated; and Schedule 3 lists the originating and two amending Acts which it repealed, namely: the Architects (Registration) Act 1931, the Architects Registration Act 1938 and parts of the Housing Grants, Construction and Regeneration Act 1996.

The unbroken continuity of these enactments is shown by paragraph 19(2)(a) of Schedule 2:

"the Council" means the Architects Registration Council of the United Kingdom established under the 1931 Act, which was renamed as the Board by section 118(1) of the 1996 Act.

The changes made by the 1996 Act to the originating Act as amended can be deduced from the Table of Derivations. This also shows that, for the purpose of the consolidation, certain definitions were inserted in the "Interpretation" section. These included one to make clear that where there is a reference to "unacceptable professional conduct", it has the same meaning as it has in section 14 (not vice versa). In subsection 14(1) the phrase is expanded as: "conduct which falls short of the standard required of a registered person".

=== The "burdens" and "choices" ===
The scheme of the consolidation Act of 1997 is identical with that of the originating Act of 1931, as amended. It is as follows:

It operates by imposing (under Part IV) one kind of burden, backed by threat of penal sanction, on persons carrying on business in the United Kingdom generally, but at the same time giving to one particular group of persons a statutory right to choose instead to submit to another kind of burden, and to another group of persons the statutory right to choose to submit to a third kind of burden.

Here, the first is described as the "general burden"; the other two as the "voluntary burdens"; and the freedom to choose the "statutory choices".

The general burden is a prohibition imposed on all persons, firms, partnerships and bodies corporate carrying on business in the United Kingdom, including architects and Chartered Architects. The prohibition is against practising or carrying on business under the title of "architect", with two exceptions, viz.:

- In the case of an individual, s/he has opted for one of the voluntary burdens and is registered or enrolled under the Act.

- In the case of a business entity (body corporate, firm or partnership) it has opted for the other of the voluntary burdens, in that its business so far as it relates to architecture satisfies the statutory requirement to be under the control, management and supervision of a registered person.

Here, the first of these is described as a "practice volunteer", and the second as a "business volunteer".

The statutory choice is exercisable:

- In the case of a practice volunteer, by applying for registration in the Register of Architects and paying the annual retention fee (under sections 4 to 11), or by enrolling in the statutory list of visiting EEA architects (under section 12).

- In the case of a business volunteer, by complying with the control, management and supervision requirements (of subsection 20(3)).

The voluntary burdens which result from the exercise of the statutory choice are as follows:

- In the case of a registered person, to submit to the regime imposed on registered persons under sections 4 to 11 of Part II (payment of fees and satisfying requirements about qualifications and competence) and Part III – Discipline.

- In the case of a person enrolled in the list of visiting EEA architects, to submit to the regime of section 12 and of Part III – Discipline.

- In the case of a business volunteer, to submit to the regime for control, management and supervision imposed by subsection 20(3) and be liable to supply the Board with information showing compliance.

In consequence:

- any person or business entity is free to supply services of the same kind as a registered person, but may only use the title "architect" in this connection subject to one of the voluntary burdens; and

- a Chartered Architect may only use this title in the course of professional practice if s/he has opted to submit to one of the voluntary burdens, normally as a registered person.

=== Side effects ===
A side effect of the Act is the imposition of burdens on third parties under Part II, namely, Schools of Architecture, but the effect of the changes made by the 1996 Act is that Schools of Architecture have disappeared from the legislation without trace. The result has been a certain amount of wrangling between the Schools, the ARB and the RIBA which is the principal professional body, whose concerns inevitably include architectural education.

Another side effect has been a claim by the ARB to be able to impose on registered persons certain requirements about Professional Indemnity Insurance.

=== The Board and its duties ===
The membership of the Board is the result of one of the changes made by the 1996 Act to the registration body's previous constitution when its name had been the Architects' Registration Council of the United Kingdom. The Act abolished the Board of Architectural Education, renamed the Council as the Board, and made this Board consist predominantly of persons appointed by the Privy Council.

Subsection 3(4) states "The Board shall publish the current version of the Register annually...". Provisions of Part II of the Act prescribe how the Register shall be kept up to date, and who shall be entitled to be registered; other provisions of Parts II and III prescribe for the Board the circumstances, events or conditions when a person's name shall be removed from the Register; and other provisions prescribe for the Board certain ancillary, or derivative and secondary, duties in connection with the Board's primary responsibility for the maintenance and regular publication of the Register of Architects.

Apart from officers, employees and agents of the Board, the Act creates no duties or obligations towards the Board which fall on any one else at all; and nothing in the Act itself creates any obligation which an architect owes to the Board.

=== Not delegated ===
Section 20 of the Architects Act 1997 mentions "architecture" (subsection (3)(b)) and the "services" of a person enrolled under the Act (subsection (5)). These are not defined by the Act, and it is quite obvious that Parliament has not delegated to the Board the power to define them. In practice, as technology and the building process continue to evolve new specialisms, the concept of architecture can be seen as becoming ever more fluid, extensive and comprehensive, and at the same time becoming narrower while ever more ancillary specialities are identified.

== The Board's Professional Conduct Committee ==
Sanctions are available to the Board under Part III of the Act against any person on the register who is found guilty under section 15 of unacceptable professional conduct or serious professional incompetence, or else has been convicted with a criminal offence which has relevance to fitness to practise.

Although a criminal conviction is an objective criterion, no statutory definition is given that defines the level of professional conduct or incompetence that will attract a sanction, judgment in the matter being given to the Board's Professional Conduct Committee, subject to commonsense, reason and judicial review.

The PCC is constituted under the Act, Schedule 1 Part II, as amended. The Committee includes members of the Board, both elected and appointed, as well as persons appointed by the Board and nominees of the President of the Law Society. A bare quorum of the Committee meets for a disciplinary hearing, comprising a nominee of the President of the Law Society (invariably a solicitor), a person from the Register and another not on the Register. PCC members are paid for their service.

== Categorisation ==
The Architects Registration Board is admittedly not a professional body or society in the sense explained in Wikipedia article "British Professional Bodies". The question whether or not it is a "regulatory agency" was publicly considered in 2003. The June 2003 issue of the RIBA Journal included the following:

The words 'regulator' and 'regulation' are not used in the Act and that status is not conferred upon the Board. It could be argued that the Board's assumption of this role is adverse to the public interest... A contrary proposition to the Board's claim is that an essential characteristic of a regulatory body in this context is to have jurisdiction or control over particular functions or activities in the supply of goods or services... whether or not the regulatory method is in conjunction with a system of certificating or licensing (such as applies to solicitors or places of entertainment)... The Board's claim to regulatory status appears to be the result of want of understanding how it can usefully go about fulfilling the services that have been assigned to it by statute for the public benefit ....

In November 2003 the Architects Registration Board published a summary of a barrister's opinion which included the following:

The Board as 'Regulator'. It has been suggested that the Board is not a 'regulator' of the architects' profession... The precise generic description that any individual chooses to give to the collection of statutory duties imposed upon, and the powers available to, the Board under the 1997 Act is in any event irrelevant for the purposes of the questions asked," [by the Board when obtaining this information for its own use] "for they largely involve issues of statutory interpretation which require the legislation to be construed and not given epithets."

== Use of "Chartered Practice" ==
The Royal Institute of British Architects, which is a professional body (see Wikipedia category list British Professional Bodies), operates a voluntary "Chartered Practice" scheme. The use of the title "Chartered Practice" is authorised under Article 4.7 of the RIBA Charter (see reference below). The Institute's website explains that the scheme requires all architectural work of a Chartered Practice to be under the supervision of a Chartered Architect. A directory listing Chartered Practices has been published annually by the Institute from 2007.

== Qualification for registration ==
The standard of qualification is not equal for all persons applying to be included in the Register of Architects.

The Registrar is bound, under section 4 of the Architects Act, to register any person who applies for registration if that person has "such qualifications and has gained such practical experience as may be prescribed".

An alternative route to registration is to satisfy the Board that an equivalent standard of competence has been achieved. A matrix can be applied as follows:

Qualifications	Practical experience	RIBA Part III
Obtained in UK	Obtained in UK	Required
Obtained in UK	Obtained in other EU	Not required
Obtained in other EU	Obtained in UK	Not required
Obtained in other EU	Obtained in other EU	Not required

The disparity arises from the European Directive on Mutual Recognition of Qualifications in Architecture 85/384/EC. (Go to Article 4 of the main text for the required duration of training. The original Directive has been updated.) It is clearly stated in that Directive that "the total length of education and training shall consist of a minimum of either four years of full-time studies at a university or comparable educational establishment or at least six years of study at a university or comparable educational establishment of which at least three must be full time".

As this is a minimum requirement there is nothing to stop a country applying higher standards to those obtaining qualifications and experience within its own jurisdiction. However it is widely held (and expressed in the report of Michael Highton to the RIBA Council) that any challenge to this disparity is likely to succeed on the grounds of irrationality. The report stated:

In our view it is only a matter of time before a UK student, who has been denied registration on the grounds that he or she has not passed the Part 3 examination, yet who has been educated in the UK and achieved two years practical experience in the UK, successfully challenges such a decision on the basis that it is irrational to require a UK based student to possess a higher level of qualification and experience than is required of a non-UK based student or architect.

If the Architects Registration Board reduced the registration requirement to four years full-time study, there is no reason why the RIBA should lower its entry standard.

== Break in annually produced copies of the Register ==
At a time when there had occurred a hiatus in production under the legislation of printed copies of the Register in the annual series from 1933, the Architects Registration Board made a new departure and in 2012 announced an online version of the Register which registered persons were invited to use for demonstrating their professionalism to members of the public and to non-registered competitors.
