= Warne Report =

Government Consultation Paper

The Warne Report was published by the United Kingdom Government in 1993. It was referred to in a government consultation paper on Reform of Architects Registration dated 19 July 1994. Eventually, certain changes to the Architects Registration Acts were enacted in 1996 which now have effect under the Architects Act 1997.

== Overview ==
The Warne Report had been drawn up by (Ernest) John (David) Warne, CB. He had been secretary to the Institute of Chartered Accountants in England and Wales from 1982 to 1990. After graduating BA in the University of London he had entered the Civil Service, and after a series of promotions and transfers (detailed in Who's Who) he had become an Under-Secretary in the Department of Industry, and eventually Deputy Director-General of the Office of Fair Trading, 1979 to 1982. Mr Warne summarised the conclusion of his report as follows:

- "My main recommendation is that the protection of title 'architect' should be abolished and ARCUK disbanded, I believe that this will help modify some of the outmoded distinctions and attitudes which inhibit change within the construction industry. It should also help the efforts being made in the architectural profession to improve the relevance of education and training to the business world in which architects must operate. Although the loss of the monopoly use of the title 'architect' (but not the term 'chartered architect') will be unwelcome to many in the profession, I suggest that time will show that the protection of title has been largely irrelevant to the standing of the architectural profession or to the public interest..."

== See also ==
- The Architects (Registration) Acts, 1931 to 1938.
- Registration of architects in the United Kingdom
