= Architects Registration Board =

Architects Registration Board logo

The Architects Registration Board (ARB) is the statutory body for the registration of architects in the United Kingdom. It operates under the Architects Act 1997 as amended, a consolidating Act. It began under the Architects (Registration) Act 1931 (21 & 22 Geo. 5. c. 33) which gave it the name the Architects' Registration Council of the United Kingdom (ARCUK). It prescribes architectural qualifications, maintains the Register of Architects, issues a code of professional conduct and competence and imposes sanctions if a finding of unacceptable professional conduct or serious professional incompetence is made against an architect. Its main source of income is fees payable under Part II of the Act by persons on their becoming registered or for their retention on the Register. The board is required to pay into the Consolidated Fund of the United Kingdom any sum paid under a penalty order which its Professional Conduct Committee has made under Part III of the Act (in conduct cases). Fines imposed by a magistrates' court (or similar in Scotland or Northern Ireland) under Part IV of the Act (in misuse of title cases) are not payable to the board.

From January 2019 all board members (five architects and six non-architects) are appointed by the Privy Council.

== Registration ==
A registrar, who may be an employee of the board or its contractor, is appointed for the purpose of admitting persons to the register or placing them on the list of visiting EU architects and, in some instances, causing matters concerning conduct and competence to be investigated.

== Prescribing qualifications ==
As the UK "competent authority" for the purpose of Article 46 of the Mutual Recognition of Professional Qualifications Directive 2005/36/EC, the ARB has published its procedures for the prescription of qualifications for persons applying for registration under section 4 of the Architects Act 1997.

In 2022, the ARB proposed radical changes to how architects were trained including scrapping the existing Parts 1 to 3 and switching to a more flexible, ‘outcomes-based’ system. The ARB said its changes "will open up the profession to a wider pool of talent, offering those who might have previously been excluded a new range of routes to qualification and professional practice".

== "Discipline" in the Architects Act 1997 (as amended) ==
The primary meaning of "discipline" traditionally refers to education, with the meaning of a branch of knowledge (as: "in what discipline is his doctorate?"; "teachers should be well trained in their subject"; "anthropology is the study of ...).

In the Architects Act 1997 (as amended) education is referred to in Part II which is headed "Registration etc.", not in Part III which is headed "Discipline". References in Part II are:

"educational establishments" in section 4A(2)(c)(i);
"education and training " in section 6(2A);
"educational bodies" in section 6(3)(b);
"architectural education" in section 6A.
"The Education Fund" is mentioned in SCHEDULE 2 (Section 27, Transitional Provisions).

In Part III of the Architects Act 1997 "Discipline" is being used in one of the secondary meanings, such as:

punish to gain control or enforce obedience: "The teacher disciplined the pupils rather frequently";

the act of punishing: "The offenders deserved the harsh discipline they received"

== Professional Conduct Committee of the ARB ==
The legislation requires there to be a Professional Conduct Committee of the Board (whose remuneration or expenses are decided and paid by the Board as the corporate body). The function of this Committee is to hear and determine allegations against registered persons which have been formally reported or referred to it in accordance with the Architects Act 1997 (as amended) and the Rules which the Board is authorised to make.

The Act states explicitly that failure to comply with the provisions of the code of professional conduct issued by the Board shall not be taken of itself to constitute unacceptable professional conduct. The Act also provides for the publication of a statement exonerating an architect against whom an allegation of unacceptable professional conduct or serious professional incompetence has not been sustained.

== Judicial precedent ==
On an appeal to a divisional court in 1957 concerning a pure breach of the Code of Professional Conduct under the legislation then in force (the architect was practising an estate agent's business as well as his own), when the registration body was constituted under the name the Architects' Registration Council of the United Kingdom, Mr Justice Devlin ruled: "It is not of itself disgraceful to disagree with a majority view and to act accordingly. It is only if a man has bound himself in honour to accept that view and to act according to the code that a deliberate breach of the code for his own profit can be called disgraceful". In the course of giving judgment in this appeal Lord Chief Justice Goddard had mentioned a letter which had been sent in 1937 by "the president of the council" [sic] to the Institute of Chartered Surveyors recognising the fact that there was nothing in a Bill, which the council was then promoting (and which subsequently became the Architects Registration Act, 1938), to interfere with the activities of registered architects.

== The decisive issues concerning the legislation for the Register of Architects ==
Records held by the British Architectural Library show that from the 1890s the motivations for promoting and opposing a registration act had been mixed. But the content of the originating act of 1931 as amended by the act of 1938 shows that the decisive issue at that time was the importance attached to giving to architects the responsibility of superintending or supervising the building works of local authorities (for housing and other projects), rather than to persons professionally qualified only as municipal or other engineers. A significant indicator for this inference is in section 1 (1) of the 1938 act.

By the 1970s that issue had had its day, to be replaced by another which has resulted in the current legislation: the Architects Act 1997 as amended. The issue which emerged in the 1970s developed into the obligation imposed on the United Kingdom and other European governments to comply with European Union Directives concerning the designation of "competent authorities" in connection with the mutual recognition of professional qualifications in favour of equal standards across borders, in furtherance of the single market policy.

== Inspection of the register ==
In connection with the protection of title and the enforcement provisions, the originating and later legislation imposed on the registration body (now the ARB) a requirement to provide copies of the Register annually. Formerly, hard bound copies of all volumes in the annual series, from volume 1 for 1933, were available for inspection by members of the public at the British Architectural Library of the Royal Institute of British Architects, London. Latterly, some hiatus on the part of the Board in producing printed copies of the Register in accordance with the legislation and the Board's previous practice has impeded the continuation of the series for retention (on the part of the British Architectural Library or others) as annual volumes for reference. The current website offers only a downloadable pdf format.

For other more limited purposes and for commercial and similar purposes names of persons currently registered can be searched online at a website maintained by the registration body. The information held on this version of the Register could help members of the public, who wish to find an architect to meet their needs, to locate a practitioner who has registered status and is conveniently situated.

== See also ==
- Architects Registration in the United Kingdom
- NSW Architects Registration Board
- Reform of Architects Registration
- European professional qualification directives
