= Architects Act 1997 =

Act of the Parliament of the United Kingdom

Architects Act 1997 (Note: Section 28(1).)
- Act of Parliament
- Parliament of the United Kingdom
- Long title: An Act to consolidate the enactments relating to architects.
- Citation: 1997 c. 22
- Introduced by: Lord Mackay of Clashfern (Lord Chancellor) (Lords)
- Territorial extent: United Kingdom (Note: Section 28(3).)

Dates
- Royal assent: 19 March 1997
- Commencement: 21 July 1997 (Note: Section 28(2). The Architects Act 1997 (Commencement) Order 1997 (SI 1997/1672).)
Other legislation
Amends	See § Repealed enactments
Repeals/revokes	See § Repealed enactments
Amended by	Architects' Qualifications (EC Recognition) Order 2002; Architects (Professional Conduct Committee) Amendment Order 2004; Architects (Recognition of European Qualifications etc and Saving and Transitional Provision) Regulations 2008; Treaty of Lisbon (Changes in Terminology) Order 2011; Architects (Recognition of European Qualifications) Regulations 2011; Crime and Courts Act 2013; Architects Act 1997 (Amendments etc) Order 2014; Architects Act 1997 (Amendment) Order 2016; Law Derived from the European Union (Wales) Act 2018; Architects Act 1997 (Amendments etc.) Order 2018; Architects Act 1997 (Amendment) (EU Exit) Regulations 2019; Architects Act 1997 (Swiss Qualifications) (Amendment) (EU Exit) Regulations 2019; Professional Qualifications and Services (Amendments and Miscellaneous Provisions) (EU Exit) Regulations 2020; Professional Qualifications Act 2022; Building Safety Act 2022; Architects (Fees, Electronic Communications and Miscellaneous Amendments) Regulations 2022; Architects Act 1997 (Amendment) Regulations 2023; Building Safety Act 2022 (Consequential Amendments and Prescribed Functions) and Architects Act 1997 (Amendment) Regulations 2023

Status: Amended

Text of statute as originally enacted

Revised text of statute as amended

The Architects Act 1997 (c. 22) is an act of the Parliament of the United Kingdom for the keeping and publishing of the statutory Register of Architects by the Architects Registration Board. It has the long title: An Act to consolidate the enactments relating to architects. It consolidated two Acts of the 1930s as later amended both by primary legislation and by Orders in Council implementing the EC directive on architects providing for the recognition of architects qualified in other EC states, and the changes which had been made by Part III of the Housing Grants, Construction and Regeneration Act 1996.

== Passage of the consolidating bill ==
The Architects Act 1997 consolidated the originating and amending acts relating to the registration of architects, namely the Architects Acts 1931-1996 (section 125 of the Housing Grants, Construction and Regeneration Act 1996).

The bill was introduced to the House of Lords on 17 December 1996 by the Lord Chancellor, Lord Mackay of Clashfern, and given its first reading. It received its second reading without call for a debate on 20 January 1997 and was passed to the Joint Committee on Consolidation Bills. On 3 March 1997 it was read for a third time without debate and passed to the House of Commons. The bill was given royal assent on 19 March 1997 and came into force on 21 July 1997.

== Legislative continuity ==
The legislative continuity from the originating act of 1931 to the consolidating act of 1997 is shown by paragraph 19(2)(a) of schedule 2 in the 1997 act:

"the Council" means the Architects' Registration Council of the United Kingdom established under the 1931 Act, which was renamed as the Board by section 118(1) of the 1996 Act.

The Architects Registration Board (ARB) has limited powers to make rules in the manner prescribed by the Architects Act 1997, but not the power to make regulations which had previously been ascribed to the registration body when it was constituted as the Architects' Registration Council of the United Kingdom (ARCUK).

== Provisions ==
The act embodied previous legislation consequent upon EU directives concerning the mutual recognition of professional qualifications in the member states of the European Union and other EEA States, and certain changes which had been made to the previous legislation after the publication of the Warne Report in 1993.

For the purpose of ascertaining the duties and functions which the Architects Registration Board is required to execute and perform under the Architects Act 1997, the constraints on the Board include the requirements judicially applicable in the name of administrative law.

In May 2006 ministerial responsibility for the ARB was transferred from the ODPM to the DCLG (Department for Communities and Local Government). The DCLG website shows that of "four categories" of "non-departmental public bodies" (NDPBs) the ARB was being classified (at the end of May 2007) as one of two "public corporations", the other one being the Audit Commission, a body of entirely different political and legislative origin, function and capacities, so that the two have practically nothing in common. The website there briefly described the ARB as:

The independent statutory regulator of all UK registered architects which has a dual mandate to protect the consumer and to safeguard the reputation of architects.

That appears to have been more a politically advised than a factual statement, in that it lacks congruity with an ordinary or accurate reading of the legislation enacted by Parliament (see further information below "Accuracy of Government Information").

=== Repealed enactments ===
Section 27 of the act repealed 3 enactments and revoked 2 instruments, listed in schedule 3 to the act.

Citation	Short title or title	Extent of repeal or revocation
21 & 22 Geo. 5. c. 33	Architects (Registration) Act 1931	The whole act.
1 & 2 Geo. 6. c. 54	Architects Registration Act 1938	The whole act.
SI 1987/1824	Architects' Qualifications (EEC Recognition) Order 1987	The whole instrument.
SI 1988/2241	Architects' Qualifications (EC Recognition) Order 1988	The whole instrument.
1996 c. 53	Housing Grants, Construction and Regeneration Act 1996	Sections 118 to 125.
1996 c. 53	Housing Grants, Construction and Regeneration Act 1996	In section 148, in subsection (2), the words "Part III (architects)," and, in subsection (3), the words "Part III (architects), and".
1996 c. 53	Housing Grants, Construction and Regeneration Act 1996	Schedule 2.

=== Amendment in 2008 under the European Communities Act 1972 ===
Amendments made in June 2008 by statutory instrument established rules for the recognition of professional qualifications enabling migrants from the European Economic Area or Switzerland to register as architects in the United Kingdom. It also set out provisions for facilitating temporary and occasional professional services cross-border.

== Changes: before and after July 1997 ==
The previous legislation had enabled and required the Register of Architects to be established, maintained and published; and for that purpose there had been a Council, called the Architects' Registration Council of the United Kingdom (ARCUK), which had been established as a body corporate by the originating Act, namely the Architects (Registration) Act, 1931.

The changes embodied in the consolidating Act of 1997 had first been enacted in Part III of the Housing Grants, Construction and Regeneration Act 1996. The changes had been made on the basis of a government consultation document dated 19 July 1994 which the Department of the Environment had issued with the title "Reform of Architects Registration". The consultation document had set out fourteen proposals for reform, stemming from a request from ARCUK to the Government in 1992 that the Architects Registration Acts should be reviewed; and stated that a report on the review which had been carried out had been published by HMSO in 1993. The report had been made by Mr E J D Warne, CB, and is commonly known as "The Warne Report".

The legislation which followed carried the proposed purposes into effect only in part. In the consultation document the purpose of the reformed body was stated to be: setting criteria for admission to the Register; preventing misuse of the title "architect"; and the discipline of unprofessional conduct, and the setting of fee levels. To that end, fourteen proposals had been enumerated. Some were later abandoned; and others substantially altered, whether in the Bill which was presented to Parliament or in its passage through Parliament, including:

- that the reformed Board would be given statutory authority to make regulations consistent with the provisions of the legislation governing architects registration;
- that the reformed Board would publicise a statement of the criteria for disciplinary offences; and
- that in disciplinary cases, there would be a range of non-monetary penalties, and hearings would be before a small statutory committee composed of both architects and non-architects, with a right to appeal to the full Board.

Proposals mentioned in the consultation document which were later enacted and are now operative were:

- that ARCUK would remain as a legal entity, but, with no impact on its role or status, the name would be changed to "Architects Registration Board" (ARB);
- that there should be an office of Registrar whose functions would be to maintain the Register and carry out the instructions of the Board;
- that the Board would be made up of 8 lay members appointed by the Government, and 7 architects elected by registered architects; and
- that the Board of Architectural Education would be abolished, by reason of it being an unwieldy body which would be unnecessary for fulfilling the functions of the reformed Registration Board.

The Table of Derivations, set out at the end of the Act after Schedule 3, by showing the changes which had been made by the 1996 Act to the originating Act of 1931 (as it had by then been amended by the 1938 Act and other legislation), distinguishes them from the provisions which were in the legislation before the 1996 Act, and so were operative in the time of ARCUK and have remained operative from 21 July 1997, when the reconstituting changes took effect.

=== Professional Conduct Committee ===
One of the changes made was replacing the Discipline Committee of ARCUK with a Professional Conduct Committee under Part III of the Act with statutory powers to inflict fines expressly on a par with criminal penalties. Under the Act, the committee was to be a body having persons who were not themselves members of the profession in the decisive majority and who would not necessarily have the appropriate skill and knowledge to be able to act competently and fairly in respect of hazarding an architect's professional reputation or livelihood; nor would members of the committee be acting under the judicial oath of a judge or a magistrate in a court of criminal or civil jurisdiction, or pursuant to the consensual jurisdiction of an arbitrator. As a safeguard of due process in accordance with the rule of law the statutory provisions for constituting the Professional Conduct Committee in Part II of Schedule 1 of the Act (and as later amended) reflect the usual practice for appointing a legally qualified chairman, with appropriate experience, who can be held to have a professional and judicial responsibility for protecting the basic right of any accused person, whose reputation and livelihood could be at stake, to a fair and unprejudiced hearing and trial.

Exoneration

Under the first section of Part III of the Act the Board is required to issue a code "laying down standards of professional conduct and practice expected of registered persons", but the same section states explicitly that failure to comply with the provisions of the code shall not be taken of itself to constitute unacceptable professional conduct. In the case of an architect against whom an allegation of unacceptable professional conduct or serious professional incompetence has not been sustained by the Professional Conduct Committee the Act provides for publication of an exonerating statement.

== Definitions ==
The Table of Derivations also shows that certain definitions which were inserted for the purpose of the consolidation included one to make clear that where there is a reference to "unacceptable professional conduct", it has the same meaning as it has in section 14 (not vice versa): in section 14(1) the phrase is expanded as "conduct which falls short of the standard required of a registered person".

== Interpretation ==
=== Legislative context of Architects Registration ===
Under the legislation, the registration body has been a statutory corporation from its inception, first as a Council of numerous persons nominated mainly by professional bodies under the 1931 Act, and, from July 1997, as a Board of fifteen persons, of which the majority has been appointed by the Privy Council in the manner prescribed by paragraph 3(1) of Schedule 1 of the Act, that is:

...after consultation with the Secretary of State and such other persons or bodies as the Privy Council thinks fit, to represent the interests of users of architectural services and the general public

Members of the general public clearly have an interest to the extent that the legislation makes it a criminal offence to infringe the restrictions placed upon the freedom of individuals (including qualified architects), and of firms and partnerships, and companies and corporations of all kinds, to use the word "architect".

From the 1880s, it has been a moot point whether the effect of such registration and protection of the title "architect" would be to place an undue burden on the profession for too little benefit for the public, or to confer an unfair advantage on the profession, or one section of it, as against competitors. But in more recent decades the statutory Register of Architects and the protection of the title "architect" under the legislation has been affected by the obligation of the Government to secure compliance with obligations in connection with membership of the European Union and the European Economic Area. This has brought in its train questions about the criteria and standards for deciding upon equivalence of professional qualifications in EU and EEA countries, and the legitimate expectations of those who have qualified.

=== Accuracy of UK government information about architects registration ===
In May 2006 the then Prime Minister (Mr Blair) arranged for ministerial responsibility for the Architects Registration Board to be transferred from the then Office of the Deputy Prime Minister (ODPM) to a newly formed Department which was to be called "Communities and Local Government" (DCLG) and to be headed by a Secretary of State (Ruth Kelly), to whom the Prime Minister addressed a letter setting out what was required. This Department's official website published the Prime Minister's letter and stated its vision to be of "prosperous and cohesive communities, offering a safe, healthy and sustainable environment for all".

The website also had a page for describing the Architects Registration Board where it offered a summary of the effect of the legislation, but which had a thread of inaccuracy in three out of four sentences, namely:

- stating that ARB "succeeded" ARCUK, when the legislation had expressly stated that it was the same body but with another name as from July 1997 (See above: Continuity of Legislation);
- stating that it was established to guarantee the professional competence of architects to consumers, when there is nothing in the legislation or otherwise giving ARB either the legal powers or the funds to honour any such guarantee; and
- that all architects must be registered by ARB in order to practise legally in the United Kingdom, when under the legislation (see related articles cited below) an architect, or any other person, is free to perform or supply the services of an architect subject only to the restrictions on the use of the vernacular word "architect" contained in the legislation first enacted by Parliament in the 1938 Act.

== See also ==
- Architects (Registration) Acts, 1931 to 1938
- Architects Registration in the United Kingdom
- Architects Registration Board
- Architects' Registration Council of the United Kingdom
- Housing Grants, Construction and Regeneration Act 1996
- Reform of Architects Registration
