= Chartered architect =

Professional qualification in the UK

A chartered architect in the United Kingdom is a corporate member of one or more of the following architects' professional bodies:

- the Royal Institute of British Architects
- the Royal Society of Ulster Architects
- the Royal Incorporation of Architects in Scotland

To become a corporate member, an architect must have passed, or gained exemption from, RIBA parts I, II and III, which includes at least two years working in practice (a minimum of seven years in total) before being able to apply.
