= Housing Grants, Construction and Regeneration Act 1996 =

Act of the Parliament of the United Kingdom

Housing Grants, Construction and Regeneration Act 1996 (Note: Section 151.)
- Act of Parliament
- Parliament of the United Kingdom
- Long title: An Act to make provision for grants and other assistance for housing purposes and about action in relation to unfit housing; to amend the law relating to construction contracts and architects; to provide grants and other assistance for regeneration and development and in connection with clearance areas; to amend the provisions relating to home energy efficiency schemes; to make provision in connection with the dissolution of urban development corporations, housing action trusts and the Commission for the New Towns; and for connected purposes.
- Citation: 1996 c. 53
- Territorial extent: England and Wales; Scotland (in part); Northern Ireland (in part); (Note: Section 148.)

Dates
- Royal assent: 24 July 1996
- Commencement: Various (Note: Section 150.)
Other legislation
Amends	Criminal Law Act 1977; Criminal Procedure (Consequential Provisions) (Scotland) Act 1995
Amended by	Trusts of Land and Appointment of Trustees Act 1996; Architects Act 1997; Land Registration Act 2002; Commonhold and Leasehold Reform Act 2002; Charities Act 2011; Policing and Crime Act 2017
Relates to	Housing Act 1996

Status: Amended

Text of statute as originally enacted

Text of the Housing Grants, Construction and Regeneration Act 1996 as in force today (including any amendments) within the United Kingdom, from legislation.gov.uk.

The Housing Grants, Construction and Regeneration Act 1996 (c. 53) is an act of the Parliament of the United Kingdom. Its long title shows that it is a piece of omnibus legislation:

An Act to make provision for grants and other assistance for housing purposes and about action in relation to unfit housing; to amend the law relating to construction contracts and architects; to provide grants and other assistance for regeneration and development and in connection with clearance areas; to amend the provisions relating to home energy efficiency schemes; to make provision in connection with the dissolution of urban corporations, housing action trusts and the Commission for New Towns; and for connected purposes.

== Disabled Facilities Grants (DFGs) ==
The act provides legislation for the provision of grant aided adaptations for disabled persons' properties within the UK. This is covered in part 1 Chapter 1. The aim of this part of the act is to allow for provision of adaptations to disabled persons' homes to reduce both the need for people to relocate to facilities which provide full-time care and to reduce the amount of care needed in people's homes. One way this is provided for is in the provision of stairlifts allowing people to continue to have use of bathroom facilities in the upstairs of their homes. Local authorities may carry out the work either through provision of money to the applicant or through an agency service. Where an agency service is offered grant applicants are not obliged to take this up in order to receive a grant. In order for adaptations to be provided, an occupational therapist is usually required to carry out an assessment of the needs of the applicant.

A grant can be used for adaptations to give better freedom of movement into and around the home and/or to provide essential facilities within it. Examples of the work which may be covered by this assistance are:

- widening doors and installing ramps
- providing or improving access to rooms and facilities - for example, by installing a stair lift or providing a downstairs bathroom
- bathroom conversion e.g. providing a level access shower, accessible WC and wash hand basin
- improving or providing a heating system which is suitable for the disabled person's needs
- improving access to and movement around the home to enable you to care for another person who lives in the property, such as a child
- alterations to door widths and ramps
- specialist equipment i.e. baths/ kitchens

The maximum mandatory values of works is £30,000 in England; however the local authority can use discretionary powers released through a later RRO to increase the value of works.

== Construction industry ==
Part 2 of the Housing Grants, Construction and Regeneration Act 1996 relates to payments in the construction industry. This part was later amended by Part 8 of the Local Democracy, Economic Development and Construction Act 2009 (LDEDC Act).

Section 108 provides a right to refer a construction dispute to adjudication.

Under section 109, a construction company with a contract lasting 45 days or more is entitled to interim or stage payments at agreed stages as the work progresses. The frequency of interim payments is to be agreed between the parties and the value of each interim payment will reflect the value of the work completed to date as determined by the project manager or cost consultant and stated in an interim certificate, less an agreed retention percentage.

The official summary of the changes made by the Local Democracy, Economic Development and Construction Act 2009 states that:

- Section 138 substitutes a new power allowing the Secretary of State and Scottish and Welsh Ministers to disapply any or all of the provisions of Part 2;
- Section 139 removes the original limitation of Part 2 to contracts which were in writing;
- Section 140 introduces a provision to facilitate the correction of clerical or typographical errors in an adjudicator's decision;
- Section 141 makes an agreement about the allocation of the costs of adjudication ineffective, so-called "Tolent" clauses, unless certain conditions apply; (Note: A "Tolent" clause in a contract states that the contractual party who issues a dispute notice will bear the adjudication costs of both parties, regardless of the outcome of the adjudication. The reference is to the legal case of Bridgeway Construction v Tolent Construction (2000).)
- Section 142 addresses the issue of making periodic payments under a construction contract conditional upon obligations under another contract, and the issue of making the date a payment becomes due dependent upon the giving of a notice by the payer of the sum the payer proposes to pay;
- Section 143 amends the original provisions relating to the notices which a payer gives of the sum which the payer proposes to pay and introduces provisions relating to the giving of notices by the payee;
- Section 144 introduces (in most cases) a statutory requirement to pay sums specified in these notices;
- Section 145 amends the original provisions relating to a contractor's right to stop working when the contractor has not been paid.

== Architects' registration ==
Part III of the act, relating to architects' registration, has been repealed and was re-enacted as the Architects Act 1997, under the Parliamentary rules for consolidating Acts.

== Housing action trusts ==
Section 144 provided for the disposal of the assets of a housing action trust on its dissolution.
