= Architects (Registration) Acts 1931 to 1938 =

Statutory citation for three acts of the United Kingdom Parliament

Architects (Registration) Act 1931 (Note: Section 1.)
- Act of Parliament
- Parliament of the United Kingdom
- Long title: An Act to provide for the Registration of architects and for purposes connected therewith.
- Citation: 21 & 22 Geo. 5. c. 33
- Territorial extent: England and Wales; Scotland; (Note: Section 58(2)–(3).)

Dates
- Royal assent: 31 July 1931
- Commencement: (Note: 1 January 1931) (Note: Section 58(1).)
- Repealed: 21 July 1997 (Note: The Architects Act 1997 (Commencement) Order 1997 (SI 1997/1672).)
Other legislation
Amended by	Architects (Registration) Act 1934; Charities Act 1960; Architects Registration (Amendment) Act 1969; Statute Law (Repeals) Act 1989
Repealed by	Architects Act 1997
Relates to	Architects Registration Act 1938

Status: Repealed

Text of statute as originally enacted

Revised text of statute as amended

Text of the Architects (Registration) Act 1931 as in force today (including any amendments) within the United Kingdom, from legislation.gov.uk.

Architects (Registration) Act 1934 (Note: Section 3(1).)
- Act of Parliament
- Parliament of the United Kingdom
- Long title: An Act to amend the Architects (Registration) Act, 1931.
- Citation: 24 & 25 Geo. 5. c. 38
- Territorial extent: England and Wales; Scotland; (Note: Section 3(2).)

Dates
- Royal assent: 25 July 1934
- Commencement: 25 July 1934 (Note: The Acts of Parliament (Commencement) Act 1793.)
- Repealed: 25 July 1969
Other legislation
Amends	Architects (Registration) Act 1931
Repealed by	Architects Registration (Amendment) Act 1969

Status: Repealed

Text of statute as originally enacted

Architects Registration Act 1938 (Note: Section 5(1).)
- Act of Parliament
- Parliament of the United Kingdom
- Long title: An Act to restrict the use of the name Architect to Registered Architects and to extend the time within which practising architects may apply for registration.
- Citation: 1 & 2 Geo. 6. c. 54
- Territorial extent: England and Wales; Scotland; (Note: Section 6.)

Dates
- Royal assent: 29 July 1938
- Commencement: 29 July 1938
- Repealed: 21 July 1997
Other legislation
Amended by	Statute Law (Repeals) Act 1989
Repealed by	Architects Act 1997

Status: Repealed

Text of statute as originally enacted

Revised text of statute as amended

Text of the Architects Registration Act 1938 as in force today (including any amendments) within the United Kingdom, from legislation.gov.uk.

The Architects (Registration) Acts, 1931 to 1938 is the statutory citation for three Acts of the United Kingdom Parliament, namely:

- Architects (Registration) Act 1931 (21 & 22 Geo. 5. c. 33);
- Architects (Registration) Act 1934; and
- Architects Registration Act 1938.

These acts have been amended and have been replaced as amended by the Architects Act 1997, with effect from 21 July 1997.

== From ARCUK in 1931 to ARB in 1997 ==
=== Extent and citation of the acts ===
By subsection 18(1), the originating act of 1931 was to come into operation on 1 January 1932, save as otherwise provided in the act; and by subsection 18(2), it was to extend to Northern Ireland only if an Order in Council was made to that effect. On the 1938 act coming into force, the 1931 act was to be construed as one with the Architects (Registration) Act 1934 and the Architects Registration Act 1938; those three acts could be cited together as the Architects (Registration) Acts, 1931 to 1938; and in the 1938 act the expression "principal Act" meant the Architects (Registration) Act, 1931.

=== Formation and duties of ARCUK ===
The Architects (Registration) Acts 1931 to 1938 required the Architects' Registration Council of the United Kingdom (ARCUK) ("the Council") to set up, maintain and publish annually a register, in the manner prescribed by the acts.

By subsection 3(1) of the 1931 act the council was to be a body corporate by the name of the Architects' Registration Council of the United Kingdom, and it was expressed to be established for the purposes of the act.

=== Architects Act 1997 ===
The governing act for the keeping and publication of the Register in the prescribed manner is now the Architects Act 1997. Its long title is:

An Act to consolidate the enactments relating to architects.

Amendments which had been made by Part III of the Housing Grants, Construction and Regeneration Act 1996 included (subsection 118(1)) renaming the Architects' Registration Council of the United Kingdom (ARCUK) as the Architects Registration Board (ARB). The 1996 Act also enacted the abolition of the statutory Board of Architectural Education (subsection 118(2)).

The effect of the 1996 Act was to repeal part of the Architects (Registration) Acts 1931 to 1938 as then amended, and to amend and add to other parts. Those Acts, as amended by the 1996 Act, were then repealed by the consolidation Act of 1997, which thereafter became the governing Act.

Subsection 13(1) of the Architects (Registration) Act 1931 had conferred on the council (ARCUK) a limited power to make regulations to prescribe anything which by the act was specifically required or authorised to be prescribed (such as, the annual retention fee or regulating meetings and procedure of the Council) and "generally for carrying out or facilitating the purposes of the act". But under subsection 13(2) any such regulations would have no force or validity unless previously approved by the Privy Council in the manner prescribed by section 13.

The board now has limited powers under the Architects Act 1997 to make rules in the manner prescribed by the act, but not to make regulations. This has not stopped the board using the word "regulation" in ways which appear to be at some variance with the contemporary usage of Parliament as the legislator, or with the usage of persons or bodies practising in the regulatory field as commonly understood, such as: "regulation of the use of title" and "regulation of all aspects relating to the conduct and discipline of architects".

=== EU directives and qualifications ===
Some risk of conceptual confusion about regulation has resulted from an apparent need to let the native language accommodate terms derived from the habitual idiom of directives and other documents issued by the European Union, formerly known as the European Economic Community, including Directive 85/384/EEC, referred to in the Architects Act 1997 in connection with the recognition of qualifications acquired in an EEA (European Economic Area) state. The directive of 10 June 1985 was headed "on the mutual recognition of diplomas, certificates and other evidence of formal qualifications in architecture, including measures to facilitate the effective exercise of the right of establishment and freedom to provide services".

The legitimate purposes of the European Union include

"the abolition, as between Member States, of obstacles to the free movement of persons and services".

This has been regularly recited in EU directives, such as Directive 2005/36/EC of 7 September 2005 "on recognition of professional qualifications". That abolishing of obstacles has brought in its train a series of directives by which the EEC/EC/EU had been carrying out its functions vis-à-vis member states in connection with the mutual recognition of the qualifications of architects and certain other professions. It was pursuant to those directives that a person from one member state (or certain other states) wishing to practise in another might be required to produce a certificate of qualification; and that in the United Kingdom, the Architects Registration Board has been acting as the "Competent Authority" in respect of architects.

Revised arrangements were introduced in June 2008, pursuant to EU Directive 2005/36/EC. This Directive defines "competent authority" among other things as a body empowered by a Member State specifically to receive the applications and to take the decisions referred to in the Directive; and "regulated profession" as a professional activity one of the modes of pursuit of which is subject by virtue of legislative provision to the possession of specific professional qualifications.

== From grant, 1932 to denial of right, 1942 ==
=== The statutory Register of Architects ===
By subsection 3(3) of the originating act of 1931 the statutory register was to be called the Register of Registered Architects. This was changed to the Register of Architects by subsection 3(3) of the 1938 act, with effect from 1 August 1940. The name the Register of Architects has continued unchanged, and remains so under the Architects Act 1997.

=== "...take and use..." ===
The long title of the 1931 act was:

An Act to provide for the Registration of architects and for purposes connected therewith.

and under section 10 persons who were entitled to apply for registration could thereby claim "to take and use the name or title 'Registered Architect' ", as a statutory right, with effect from 1932. (Note: Accordingly, in H.B.Creswell's Essay in Building Arbitration (Jago v. Swillerton & Toomer Architectural Press) first published in 1931, the witness Groag could be described as "Surveyor and Registered Architect".)

=== Penal restriction ===
That was radically altered by the 1938 act, as its long title indicates:

An Act to restrict the use of the name Architect to Registered Architects and to extend the time within which practising architects may apply for registration.

Among other things, by section 1 of the 1938 act, with effect from 1 August 1940, section 10 of the 1931 act would be replaced by subsection 1(1) of the 1938 act. The effect of this was that, instead of allowing qualified persons to use a statutory title if they chose to apply for it, restrictions on the use of the vernacular word "architect" were introduced which were to apply to all persons, including fully qualified practising members of the Royal Institute of British Architects or other chartered bodies, or societies or associations, of architects; and this innovation was imposed under threat of penalty on prosecution in the magistrates' courts.

=== Recommended abolition ===
When the Warne Report was published in 1993, it was found that its principal recommendation was abolition of protection of the title "architect" and the disbanding of ARCUK. Instead, the Council has been reconstituted and renamed as the Architects Registration Board and now operates under the Architects Act 1997.

== See also ==
- EU "Sectoral Directives"
