= NWSA =

NWSA may refer to:

- News Corp's Nasdaq ticker symbol for Class A stock
  - News Corporation, News Corp's predecessor under the same ticker symbol
- New World School of the Arts, a public high school in Miami, Florida
- National Woman Suffrage Association, of 1869 which became the National American Woman Suffrage Association in 1890
- North Wales Society of Architects, a branch of the Royal Society of Architects in Wales
- Northwest Service Academy, an AmeriCorps program in the Pacific Northwest
- Northwest School of Agriculture, a program at University of Minnesota Crookston
- Northwest School of the Arts, a public high school in Charlotte, North Carolina
- National Water and Sanitation Authority; see Water supply and sanitation in Yemen
- National Women's Studies Association, publishes Feminist Formations
