= Alan Jones (architect) =

Northern Irish architect & academic (born 1964)

Alan Montgomery Jones (born September 1964) is a chartered architect and academic based in Northern Ireland, UK. He studied architecture at Queen's University Belfast, and after working in London, returned to Northern Ireland in 1998 to practise, and to teach at Queen's University Belfast. He jointly led architecture at Queen's for several years, and is currently a professor of architecture in its School of Natural and Built Environment.

Jones served as president of the Royal Society of Ulster Architects from May 2012 to 2014. He was elected as president of the Royal Institute of British Architects (RIBA) for two years from 1 September 2019, the first person from Northern Ireland to hold that office. During his presidency, information relating to him was not adequately protected and controlled by the RIBA, eventually admitted by the RIBA in a June 2025 statement. He served his two-year term as RIBA president, but feeling unable to support a proposal to renew the contract of the RIBA chief executive, Jones resigned as a board member and trustee in July 2021, one month before finishing his presidential term.

Jones has since chaired a group reviewing construction industry resources in the Belfast city region, and advised Northern Ireland's Department for Communities on architecture and built environment policy.

== Education ==
Born in September 1964, Jones was educated at the state-funded D.H. Christie Memorial Primary School (part of The Honourable The Irish Society group of schools), at two state-funded grammar schools, Coleraine Academical Institution and Ballymena Academy, and then, supported by an education grant, at Queen's University Belfast.

== Career ==
Having previously worked with London-based Michael Hopkins and Partners for seven years, and as an associate with David Morley Architects, Jones returned to Northern Ireland in 1998 to take up private practice as founder and principal of Alan Jones Architects (AJA), and to teach in the School of Architecture at Queen's University Belfast.

At AJA, Jones has realised numerous projects, including the stainless steel-clad farmhouse extension at Cranfield (RIBA award), Straidhavern School, his family home in Randalstown (which received the RSUA design award for residential projects, a RIBA award, and was shortlisted for the RIBA Manser Medal), an office for a coffee importer in Belfast (which received a special mention in the Architectural Association of Ireland awards) and the £4.2M Alley Arts and Conference Centre in Strabane, a joint project by Glenn Howells Architects, Birmingham and AJA, which gained an RSUA award in 2008.

Jones / AJA work has featured in newspapers including The Independent and the Sunday Times and in professional journals including RIBA Journal, Architects' Journal, Domus (Milan), Wallpaper*, Architecture Today, Blueprint, Vision (Shanghai), and Hinge (Hong Kong). The Daily Telegraph listed Jones as one of the UK's "top notch architects". His work has also been included in technical publications, including Birkhauser's Fibre Cement: Technology and Design (2006) and the RIBA Guide to Architectural Insitu Concrete (2007).

=== Education and research ===
From 2008 to 2016, as director of education (architecture), Jones jointly managed and led the subject area of architecture at Queen's University. He was appointed a professor in 2019. He has been invited to be a design critic at the schools of architecture in Delft, Robert Gordon University (then Institute), Cambridge, North London, Bath, and Dublin Institute of Technology and University College Dublin. He was a member of the RIBA Education Committee (2001–2012). Through over 100 role models, his "Success through Architecture" project documents the diversity of mainstream practice and the "extended profession" within other areas of business and culture. He was a member of the advisory panel, along with Robin Nicholson and others, for the 2015–2017 AHRC-funded research project "The Value of Architecture and Architects". He has also judged various student education awards, including bronze and silver submissions for the RIBA President’s Awards.

=== Professional governance roles ===
Jones has been a member of the governing council and trustee of the Royal Society of Ulster Architects from 1998 to 2006 and from 2007. He has been an invited judge for RIBA, RSUA and Royal Incorporation of Architects in Scotland awards, including the RIAS Andrew Doolan Award. In May 2012 he became RSUA president for 2012 to 2014. From 2008 to 2016, Jones led architectural education at Queen's University from mid to high rankings in The Guardian league table and first in the 2018 table for added value. He has advised other schools of architecture, and been an external examiner at parts 1 and 2 (Manchester, Dundee and University of Nottingham).

Jones was elected in a national vote to the RIBA Council in 2015. In September 2015 he received unanimous approval of the council to be vice-president of education for 2015–2017 and again for 2017–2018. He also led RIBA efforts to improve social mobility in architecture, producing a report in 2018 and continuing to work in related fields, including on socio-economic aspects of diversity and inclusion, with the Architects Registration Board (2022 report).

=== RIBA president ===
In 2016 Jones was a runner-up in the election for president of the RIBA, with 44% of the final vote. Two years later, in August 2018, Jones was elected as president of the RIBA, with 51.66% of the votes on an 18.97% election turnout, taking office for an expected two-year term from 1 September 2019.

In early 2020, Jones made complaints about RIBA CEO Alan Vallance. Shortly afterwards, on 31 March 2020, Jones announced that he was stepping back temporarily from his leadership role. Architects' Journal columnist Paul Finch observed the RIBA's "secretariat goes into overdrive", and downplayed the matter ("The kerfuffle at Portland Place is a presidential-sized fuss over nothing"); Archinect expected Jones to serve out his full two-year term. On 12 June, Jones said he would resume office on 15 June 2020.

While president, Jones appeared on BBC Two's Christmas University Challenge in December 2020, answering one question – incorrectly – for the Queen's, Belfast team.

In July 2021, just over a month before Jones' presidential term was due to end, he resigned as a RIBA board member and trustee due to ongoing differences with Vallance. Senior figures demanded the body 'come clean' about the issues saying "The RIBA is becoming an increasingly secretive organisation. ... Confidentiality has been weaponised and woe betide anyone who wants to ask difficult questions...."

Jones completed his two-year term on 31 August 2021, and summed up the time:

"Across my two years as RIBA President, by working closely with Council, Board, staff and the wider membership, we have achieved a great deal....We decided to reorientate the profession, to demonstrate our relevance, our value, and present ourselves as part of the solution to some of society’s toughest challenges. We’ve made a solid start and I am particularly proud of the President’s Fact-Finding Mission, a set of long-term goals and short-term plans, that form the ‘Guiding Star’ of RIBA’s 2034 Masterplan to keep the profession and Institute on track."

Jones said: "in terms of [RIBA's] transparency and accountability, there is room for improvement. ... While every institution needs to respect confidentiality and comply with GDPR, these cannot be used as reasons to prevent openness about the running of an organisation". He also confirmed "Over the last 30 years, I've given my all to the RIBA and I will of course continue to give this incredible institute my full support."

In June 2025, after reaching a confidential settlement with Jones, the RIBA issued a statement saying "The RIBA regrets the fact that unauthorised leaks occurred and the harm that this caused Professor Jones and his family". Jones responded: "I am glad to have reached a confidential settlement with RIBA regarding my complaint that information relating to me was not adequately protected and controlled by RIBA.... RIBA is important to our profession.... My commitment and enthusiasm for RIBA continues ..." In September 2026, the RIBA confirmed it had paid £150,000 to settle the dispute with Jones over leaked information.

=== Later career ===
In 2021, Jones became a member of the Construction Industry Council's Strategic Review Advisory Group, and chair of a Belfast City group reviewing construction industry resources to deliver the Belfast City Regional Deal. In 2023, he was a member of an advisory panel on a national spatial development framework for Georgia, and from 2024 to 2026, he was a member of an advisory group appointed by Northern Ireland's Department for Communities to review an architecture and built environment policy for the country.

== Awards and honours ==
For his contributions to practice, education, and the profession, Jones was appointed a Fellow of the RIBA in 2017. In March 2016 he also accepted an Honorary Fellowship from the RIAS. In 2019 he was bestowed with honorary membership of the Royal Architectural Institute of Canada and in 2021 with honorary membership of the American Institute of Architects.

Seven projects he worked on received RIBA awards:

- Schlumberger Cambridge Research Centre, Phase 2 (with Hopkins)
- Queen's Building, Emmanuel College, Cambridge (with Hopkins)
- Indoor Cricket School at Lord's (with David Morley Architects)
- New Shop at Lord's (with David Morley Architects)
- Offices for ECB/TCCB at Lord's (with David Morley Architects)
- Addition to farmhouse (Alan Jones Architects) - RIBA Award 1999
- New House, Randalstown (Alan Jones Architects) - RIBA Award 2007

Two projects were shortlisted for the 1997 Stirling Prize:

- Queen's Building, Emmanuel College, Cambridge (with Hopkins)
- Indoor Cricket School at Lord's (with David Morley Architects)

== Publications ==
=== Books ===
- Toward an architecture: Ulster – Building our own authenticity, with David Brett, Black Square Books, 2008.
- Defining Contemporary Professionalism, co-edited with Rob Hyde, RIBA Publishing, September 2019.

=== Guides ===
- Studying Architecture Well – "a guide to help current and would-be students of architecture in the UK both to do well during their studies and, importantly, to stay well as they cope with the opportunities, stresses and strains of learning", Jenny Russell, Matt Thompson with Alan Jones, RIBA, 2021.
- Practise Architecture Well – "a free guide is to help freshly qualified and early-career architects both to do well during their career and, importantly, to stay well as they cope with the stresses and strains of being a member of the profession", Jenny Russell, Matt Thompson with Alan Jones, RIBA 2021.

Preceded by Norman Hutchinson	RSUA President; 2012–2014	Succeeded by R. Martin Hare
