= Flag of Nottinghamshire =

Flag of English county

Nottinghamshire
- County Flag of Nottinghamshire
- Use: County flag
- Proportion: 3:5
- Adopted: 20 May 2011; 15 years ago
- Design: A white-fimbriated symmetric red cross on a green field, defaced with a white shield charged with a green silhouette of James Woodford's bronze statue of Robin Hood
- Designed by: BBC Radio Nottingham

The flag of Nottinghamshire was registered with the Flag Institute in 2011. The flag includes a white-fimbriated red St George's Cross on a green background, and a green silhouette of James Woodford's bronze statue of Robin Hood on a white shield located close to Nottingham Castle. It is one of the very few flags in the world to feature a fictional character.

The flag was formed as part of a group of finalists in a BBC competition to select a flag for the county, and voted as winner by a countywide poll of the shortlist. It is raised every year in the county hall.

== Design ==
The flag shows a white-fimbriated red St George's cross on a green field, with a white shield in the middle. The white shield has a device of a green silhouette of James Woodford's statue of Robin Hood with a bow and arrow, which in real life is located next to Nottingham castle. Robin Hood's position is supposed to represent Nottingham's central geographical position in England.

The green background is supposed to symbolise the green fields of the county. The flag is in a 3:5 ratio.

=== Colours ===
Scheme	Green	Red	White
Pantone (paper)	364 C	186 C	Safe
HEX	#4A7729	#C8102E	#FFFFFF
CMYK	71.4.100.45	2.100.85.6	0.0.0.0
RGB	74, 119, 41	200, 16, 46	255, 255, 255

== History ==
The flag's central charge is of Robin Hood, a legendary figure of English folklore, who, according to tradition, had his lands seized by the Sheriff of Nottingham. He is thus seen as a heroic figure of the region. The stance he is in, ready to shoot his bow, is more specifically based on the statue by James Woodford, which is located near Nottingham Castle. Several Nottinghamshire-based organisations had previously used a similar design on their emblems and logos, of Robin Hood's silhouette on a shield.

=== 2011 competition ===
Nottinghamshire's flag was registered on May 20th 2011, following its win in a design competition to choose county flag. The contest was organised by BBC Radio Nottingham presenter Andy Whittaker, who had overseen a similar competition to select the flag of Derbyshire.

Local residents Jane Bealby and Mike Gaunt contacted Whittaker to suggest that Nottinghamshire have its own flag. The response to the suggestion was overwhelmingly positive and BBC Nottingham contacted the Flag Institute, the organisation that advices on British vexillogical matters. A panel of judges was formed, which included Alex Farquharson, the director of Nottingham Contemporary, the Flag Institute's Michael Faul, card designer Rachel Church, local businessman Mich Stevenson, graphic designers Jason Holroyd and Simon Dunn, and the two listeners whose contact prompted the competition, Jane Bealby and Mike Gaunt.

Graphic designer Simon Dunn used the submissions including drawings and ideas to create three final designs. Most of the feedback received indicated that the flag should feature a prominent symbol of Nottinghamshire, such as Robin Hood or oak leaves, and crosses and arrows were common suggestions for layout.

The following were the finalists in the judging process:

Design 1

Design 2

Design 3 (winner)

And the final selection was made as the result of a poll which had thousands of respondents. Whittaker said of the result: "The idea came from the people, the designs came from the people and it's now a fantastic flag for the people of Nottinghamshire to fly with pride."

A flag-raising ceremony is held every year, to begin a week of festivities leading up to Nottinghamshire Day on the 25th August.

== Flag of Nottinghamshire County Council ==
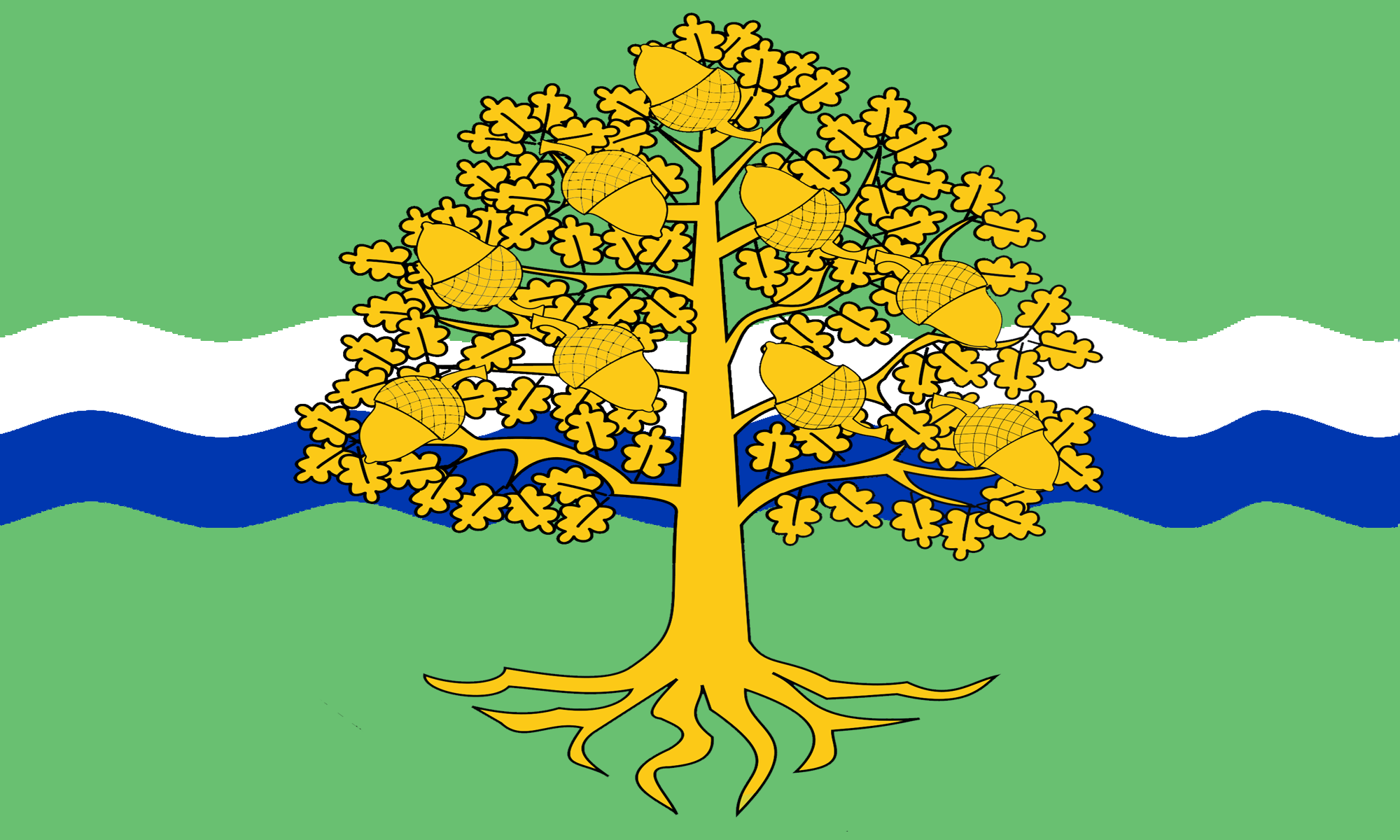
Flag of Nottinghamshire County Council

The Banner of Arms of the Nottinghamshire County Council has a large stylized gold oak tree representing Sherwood Forest defacing a wavy blue and white horizontal wave pattern representing the Trent River that runs across the country.

Prior to the creation of the current flag, this was flown as the standard of Nottinghamshire. Then-secretary of state Eric Pickles suggested in 2011 that the county flags of England be flown outside of the national ministry of Housing's Eland House in Victoria. The deputy leader of Nottinghamshire County Council said:

The people of Nottinghamshire are proud of their cultural heritage and it is delightful to see the historical importance of this county being recognised nationally.
