= Alley Theatre (Strabane) =

Theatre in Strabane, County Tyrone, Northern Ireland, United Kingdom

Coordinates: 54.8276°N 7.4642°W

The Alley Theatre is a theatre in Strabane, County Tyrone, Northern Ireland. The venue hosts an auditorium, art gallery, tourist information centre. A statue, Where Dreams Go (known locally as "Ambrose the Pig") by Martin Heron, is located in its piazza.

Designed by architects Glenn Howells and AJA, the arts complex was officially opened in 2007 by Edwin Poots MLA and Margaret Ritchie MLA. It has hosted various arts festivals, shows and exhibitions. In addition to running arts, music and drama workshops/performances, the Alley hosts three major drama festivals each year, Stagewrite (for primary schools), North West Schools Drama Festival (colleges) and the Strabane Drama Festival, now one of the biggest drama festivals in the North West of Ireland. The Alley has also hosted the North West Music Festival, the largest brass band competition in the North West of Ireland and the Johnny Crampsie Festival, an Irish music festival.

The Alley has won the Green Apple Award for environmental regeneration, Building of the Year 2009 from the Royal Society of Ulster Architects, the Suzy Lamplugh Trust for UK Personal Safety Workplace 2010, the Allianz Arts and Business Award 2009 and the Access Award 2009 for disability access.

Where Dreams Go ("Ambrose the Pig") is situated in the Alley's piazza. An 8 ft bronze pig with Celtic swirls on its body, the statue is situated outside the Alley staring at the sky, and was commissioned to highlight the history of the Alley Theatre site, formerly the cattle and pig market for Strabane in the 18th and 19th century. The site also used to accommodate the various travelling circuses.

In June 2026, theatre announced that it would close until 2027 due to water damage.
