= Dundee Institute of Architects =

Professional body for architects based in Dundee, Scotland

- Abbreviation: DIA
- Formation: 1884
- Type: Professional body
- Purpose: To promote architecture and improve the quality of both our built and natural environments
- Region served: Tayside and North Fife
- Members: c. 350 architects
- Affiliations: RIAS
- Website: Dundee Institute of Architects

Dundee Institute of Architects (DIA) is a professional body for architects and a chapter of the Royal Incorporation of Architects in Scotland (RIAS), based in Dundee. The institute was established by architects in Dundee in 1884, and now represents a much wider geographic area than its name suggests.

== History ==
The Dundee Institute of Architecture, Science and Art was established in 1884 on the proposal of Charles Ower, a specialist in domestic architecture. He suggested that a local organisation be formed along the lines of London's Architectural Association, "to afford facilities for the study of architecture, the applied sciences and the fine arts by means of papers and discussions; sectional meetings, classes for study; prizes; visits to public works and buildings or excursions for sketching; and such other means as the council may determine".

In 1891 the institute became the second architectural society in Scotland to enter into an alliance with the Royal Institute of British Architects, giving recognition to Dundee as the centre for architectural education north of the River Tay.

At the instigation and with the support of the institute, pupilage was initially supplemented by evening classes and by the 1920s, a School of Architecture was established. This was at the local Technical Institute before being moved to the new art college. In the 1930s, the Architect's Institute was involved in discussions concerning the proposed Duncan of Jordanstone College of Art. Once the college was established, the institute provided a representative on the board of governors and also provided teaching staff.

The period after 1945 has been marked by the institute's continued interest in architectural education, providing a liaison between local architectural practices and the School of Architecture at the Duncan of Jordanstone College, University of Dundee.

The chapter celebrated its 125th anniversary in 2009, when it hosted the 2009 RIAS Convention as part of its anniversary celebrations. Its archives, covering the period 1884 to 1995, are held by Archive Services, University of Dundee.

== DIA Awards ==
The DIA Awards are now in their third decade and have undergone a rapid growth, which has also seen a dramatic increase in the quality of the overall submissions. The annual Awards (held in November) are a key part of the strategy to promote architecture via education and engagement with the general public. Past winners have included Frank Gehry, Richard Murphy and Building Design Partnership.

== See also ==
- RIBA
- RIAS
- RSUA
- List of architecture prizes
