= Ben Derbyshire =

British architect

Ben Derbyshire is a British architect. He is the current chair of HTA Design LLP and a former president of the Royal Institute of British Architects.

Derbyshire joined HTA Design in 1976 and has been a co-owner since 1986.

Derbyshire is a Commissioner of Historic England. He serves on their London Advisory Committee, High Streets Heritage Action Zone Board.

Derbyshire is on the governing body of WCCA Worshipful Company of Chartered Architects, a modern livery company of the City of London. WCCA exists to promote architecture in the City of London and the architectural profession globally.

Derbyshire is President of the London Forum of Amenity and Civic Societies which represents the views and interests of over 100 amenity and civic societies in London on issues of Planning, Development Management, Heritage, Transport, Environment, Waterways and Open Spaces that are important for those who work and live in London.

The RIBA is a global professional membership body. Derbyshire oversaw fundamental change in the financing and governance of the institute and the instigation of policies in relation to climate action, professional competence and codes of conduct. In September 2017, he succeeded Jane Duncan as RIBA president, a role he held for two years before being succeeded by Alan Jones. Derbyshire was the RIBA's 76th president.
