= Architectural technologist =

Occupation

The architectural technologist, also known as a building technologist, provides technical building design services and is trained in architectural technology, building technical design and construction.

Architectural technologists apply the science of architecture and typically concentrate on the technology of building, design technology and construction. The training of an architectural technologist concentrates on the ever-increasingly complex technical aspects in a building project, but matters of aesthetics, space, light and circulation are also involved within the technical design, leading the professional to assume decisions which are also non-technical. They can or may negotiate the construction project, and manage the process from conception through to completion, typically focusing on the technical aspects of a building project.

Most architectural technologists are employed in architectural and engineering firms, or with municipal authorities; but many provide independent professional services directly to clients, although restricted by law in some countries. Others work in product development or sales with manufacturers.

In Britain, Ireland, Sweden, Denmark, Hong-Kong (Chartered Architectural Technologist), Canada (Architectural Technologist or Registered Building Technologist), Argentina (M.M.O Maestro Mayor de Obras / Chartered Architecture & Building Science Technologist) and other nations, they have many abilities which are extremely useful in a technological sense to work alongside architects, engineers and other professionals - the training of a technologist provides skills in building and architectural technology. It is an important role in the current building climate. Architectural technologists may be directors or shareholders of an architectural firm (where permitted by the jurisdiction and legal structure). To become an Architectural Technologist, a four-year degree (or equivalent) in Architectural Technology (in Canada normally a three year diploma) is required, which can be followed by a Master's Degree, with structured professional and occupational experience.

== By Country ==
Canada

In the province of Ontario, the Association of Architectural Technologists of Ontario (AATO) was founded in 1969. The Association holds four titles, Architectural Technologist, Registered Building Technologist, Architectural Technician and Registered Building Technician and the French equivalent of each title. The Association recognizes students and has an Internship process for members that incorporates both education and work experience for members. Our membership is involved in all aspects of the construction industry and often form part of the team of professionals on all types of projects.

In the province of Nova Scotia, the Architectural Technologist Association of Nova Scotia (ATANS) traces its origins to 1968 and was formally re-established in 2025. ATANS advocates for the recognition, accreditation, and future regulation of architectural technologists and technicians in the province. The association promotes professional development pathways for students, associate members, and professionals, and supports national accreditation standards.

Architectural Technologists practice independently on Part 9 buildings (housing and small buildings), and support architects, and engineers on larger, more complex Part 3 buildings. Their work in practice includes preparing construction drawings, specifications, permit applications, building code reviews, zoning analysis, and technical design.

=== Ireland ===
In Ireland, the Royal Institute of the Architects of Ireland RIAI declares being the leading professional body for Architectural Technologists in Ireland. The RIAI recognises the professional Architectural Technologist as a technical designer, skilled in the application and integration of construction technologies in the building design process. RIAI Architectural Technologists are recognised as professional partners to Architects in the delivery of exemplary buildings in Ireland and worldwide. However, the Royal Institute of the Architects of Ireland has always prevented its technician members to provide a full architectural service. Many qualified architectural technologists believe that a conflict of interest exists, that the RIAI represents architects and cannot adequately defend the interests of architectural technologists: "The RIAI acts as the Registration Body and Competent Authority for "Architects" in Ireland and only provides support services for Irish AT'".

Another representative body is the Chartered Institute of Architectural Technologists (CIAT). The technologist membership of the RIAI (RIAI tech) is equivalent to the associate membership of CIAT (ACIAT). Chartered members of CIAT (MCIAT) are qualified and recognised to lead a project from inception through to completion. The RIAI and the CIAT were represented within the Building Regulations Advisory Body (BRAB) which advised the Minister for the Environment on matters relating to the Building Regulations. BRAB is no longer active. CIAT is now challenging the Building Control Regulations 2014, which are depriving its members from providing full architectural services in Ireland. The Irish Government appears to have no valid reason to prevent CIAT members from practising in Ireland. The restrictions imposed on members of the CIAT are viewed as anti-competitive and in breach of European Law for free movement of services. The CIAT is awaiting for an opinion from the European Commission on this issue.

=== South Africa ===
In South Africa the profession is by the South African Institute of Architectural Technologists SAIAT. Senior architectural technologists (10 years or more in practice) enjoy the same statute than architects. The South African Institute of Architects (SAIA) explains that: "Architecture can be practiced in one of four categories of registered person, namely professional architect, professional senior architectural technologist, professional technologist or professional draughtsperson. The possibility of progression from one category to the next has been provided for in the Regulations."

=== United Kingdom ===
In the United Kingdom, chartered architectural technologists enjoy the same status as architects. They deliver similar services with a different orientation. The Chartered Institute of Architectural Technologists CIAT regulates the profession. CIAT defines chartered architectural technologists as follow: Chartered Architectural Technologists provide architectural design services and solutions. They are specialists in the science of architecture, building design and construction and form the link between concept and construction. They negotiate the construction project and manage the process from conception through to completion. Chartered Architectural Technologists, MCIAT, may practise on their own account or with fellow Chartered Architectural Technologists, architects, engineers, surveyors and other professionals within the construction industry. As professionals adhering to a Code of Conduct, they are required to obtain and maintain mandatory Professional Indemnity Insurance (PII) if providing services directly to clients. They specify products with reference to the RIBA Product Selector, Architects Standard Catalogue, Barbour Index and trade literature.

== See also ==
- Architect
- Architectural drawing
- Architectural engineering
- Architectural technology
- Building engineer
- Building engineering
- Building services engineering
- Project engineering
- Construction manager
- Construction engineering
- Construction engineer
- Drafter
- Engineering technician
- Engineering technologist
