= Gardyne's Land, Dundee =

Complex of five buildings in the High Street, Dundee, Scotland

Coordinates: 56.4610°N 2.9697°W

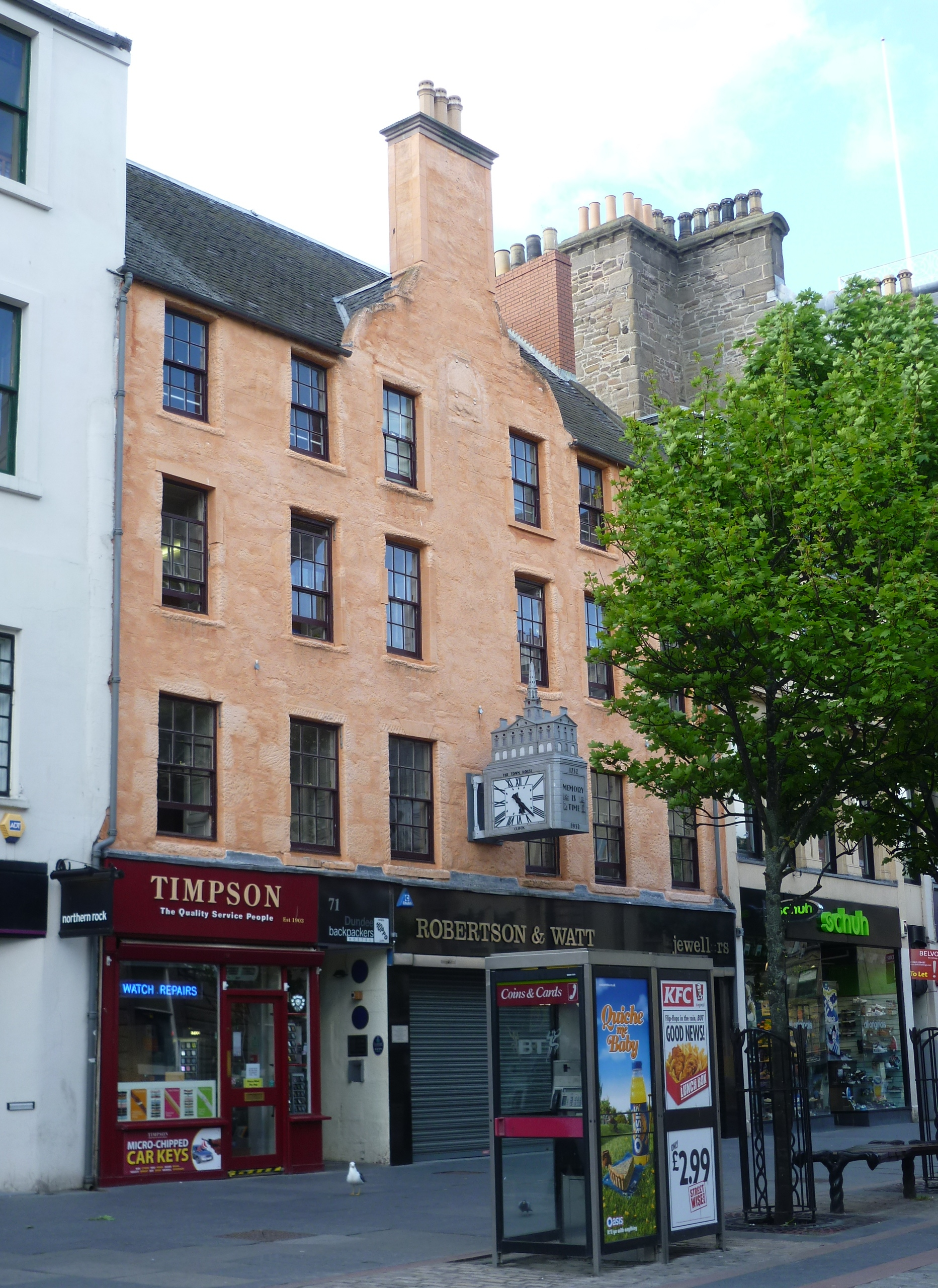
Gardyne's Land

Gardyne's Land is a complex of five historic buildings on the High Street, Dundee, Scotland. They are the oldest domestic buildings in that city.

== Description ==
Gardynes Land consists of an L-plan three-storey merchant's house from around the year 1560; lodgings from around 1640; a tenement from around 1790; a billiard hall from around 1820 and a Victorian retail unit from around 1845. All five Gardynes Land buildings are Category A listed buildings.

Gardynes Land came to the attention of the Tayside Building Preservation Trust in 1995. Between 1997 and 2000, the Trust acquired the buildings and raised funds for their restoration. A first phase of wind and waterproofing works started in 2000. Between 2000 and 2003, a professional team were appointed and plans were first drawn up and approved for converting the complex into a hostel. In April 2005, the Gardynes Land project was handed over to the Dundee City Council.

The Gardyne's Land restoration has received awards from the Dundee Civic Trust, the Dundee Institute of Architects, the Royal Town planning institute, a Scottish award for quality in planning and regeneration and renewal magazine.
