= Ruth Reed =

British architect

Ruth Reed is a British architect and was the first woman to be elected president of the Royal Institute of British Architects (RIBA) 2009–2011. She was brought up in Shrewsbury and now lives in Birmingham.

Reed set up her practice, Reed Architects, in mid-Wales in 1992, specialising in self-build projects. She also worked in teaching and, from 2006, was Director of the Part 3 Postgraduate Diploma in Architectural Practice course at the Birmingham School of Architecture.

She was President of the Royal Society of Architects in Wales (RSAW) from 2003 to 2005. On 1 September 2008 she became president elect of the RIBA, which she described as "a great honour and privilege". She planned to divide her time between her RIBA flat in London and her house in Birmingham. Reed later said she preferred "measured and discreet lobbying" and had voiced the profession's concerns in person to the new government minister, Michael Gove. She ended her presidency by publicly criticising the government's Free Schools strategy.
