= George Grey Wornum =

British architect (1888–1957)

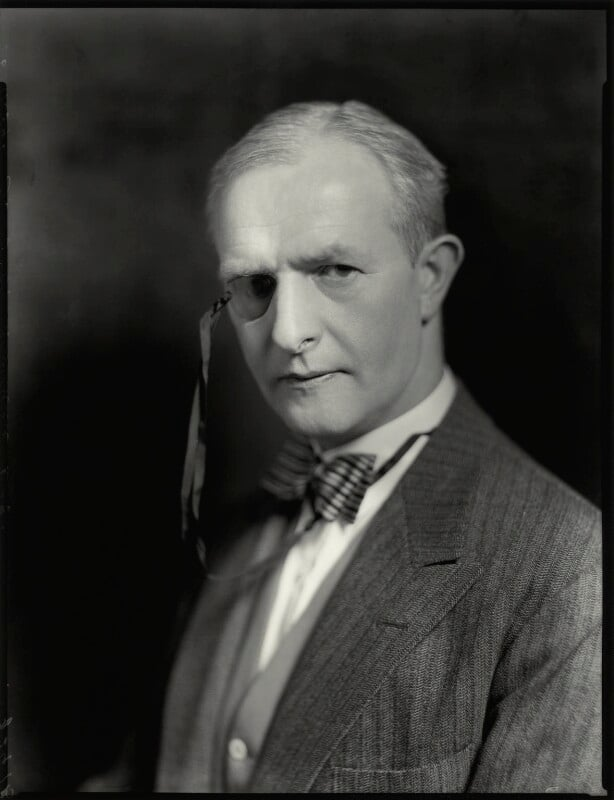
Wornum in 1934, wearing his signature black-rimmed monocle to disguise his missing eye

George Grey Wornum CBE (17 April 1888 – 11 June 1957) was a British architect.

Grey Wornum was born in London and educated at Bradfield College and the Slade School of Art. He studied architecture under the guidance of his uncle, Ralph Selden Wornum. Badly wounded in the First World War he suffered leg injuries and the loss of his right eye, which had no effect on his subsequent achievements as an architect. He married the American designer Miriam Alice Gerstle in 1923. In his later years he spent some time in Bermuda for health reasons. He died in New York City and was named CBE in the Birthday Honours list published two days after his death.

== Achievements ==
Wornum was winner of the Royal Gold Medal for Architecture in 1952.

His notability rests upon his design of the RIBA Building, the Royal Institute of British Architects' Headquarters at 66 Portland Place, London. Wornum's entry was judged the best of 284 in the competition for a new RIBA headquarters. Completed in 1934, the building was opened by King George V and Queen Mary.

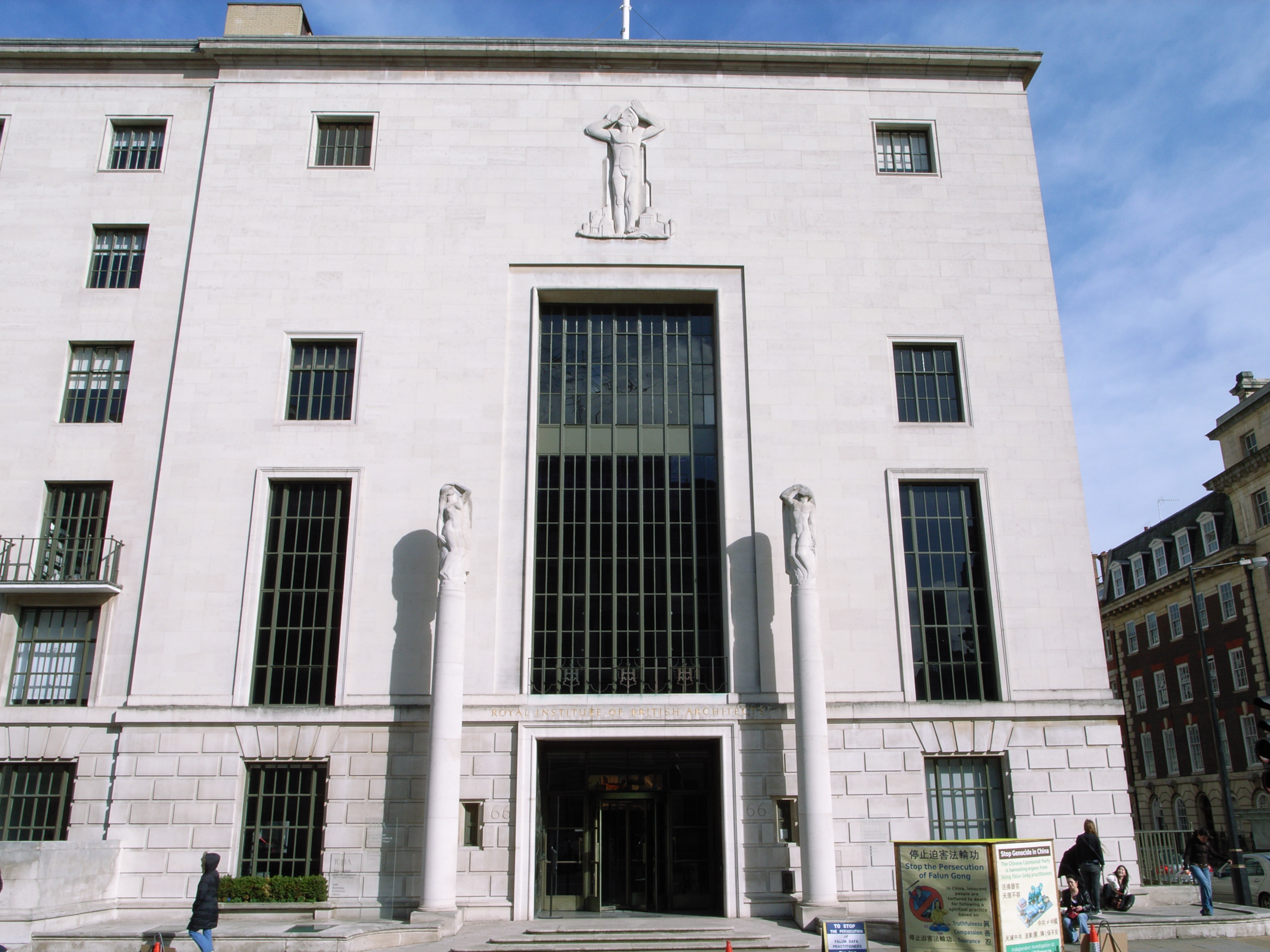
RIBA 66 Portland Place London.

One of his earliest commissions, in 1922, was the redecoration and expansion of "The King's Hall" at the Royal Bath Hotel in Bournemouth, which had been built around the outbreak of World War I and had remained only temporarily decorated pending the return of pre-war conditions.

He supervised the interior decorative designs of the original RMS Queen Elizabeth liner and was responsible for the layout of Parliament Square greatly praised in an article in The Times on 13 November 1952.

His work for Westminster Council included municipal buildings and a simple, stylish design of lamp post, many of which are still in use.

His most notable work outside the UK is the English Girls' College, founded in 1935 and now known as the El Nasr Girls' College in Alexandria, Egypt.

In 1936 he was asked by the Cities of Westminster and London to co-ordinate the street decorations for the coronation of Edward VIII. The planning was disrupted when the new King abdicated. Modifications to the plans were then made for the coronation of King George VI and Queen Elizabeth on the same intended day, 12 May 1937.

In the late 1930s, Wornum designed the Fraser Gardens housing estate in Dorking, Surrey for residents who had been cleared from slum dwellings in the town centre. The development was named after Sir Malcolm Fraser, who had funded the purchase of the land on which it was built.

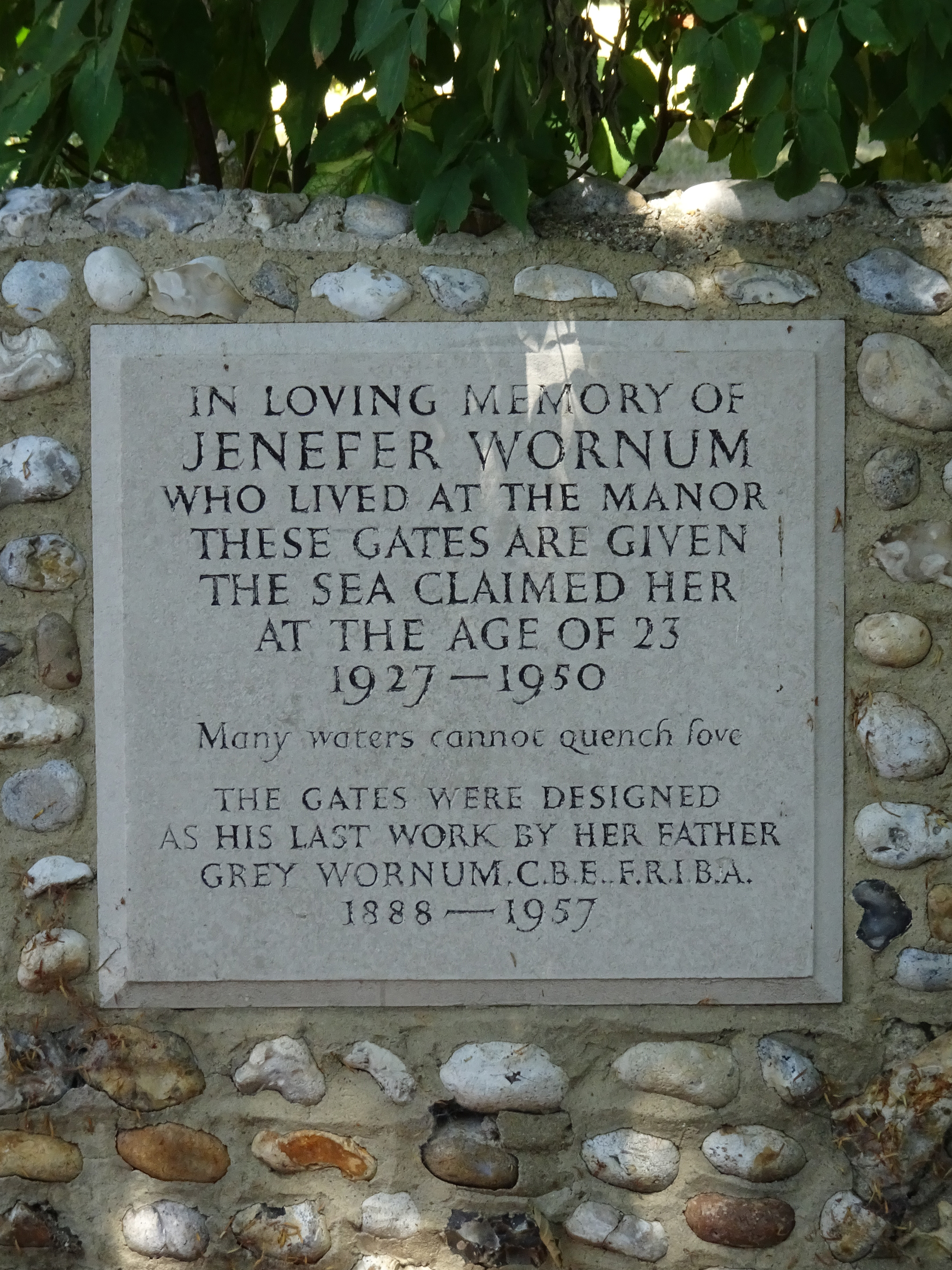
Plaque commemorating Wornum and his daughter

In 1946 he collaborated with John Gloag on "House out of Factory", a book about the practical side of the design, production and construction of pre-fabricated houses in the aftermath of the Second World War.
