= Jane Duncan (architect) =

British architect

Jane Duncan OBE (born 7 July 1953) is a British chartered architect, based in Buckinghamshire.

She was elected in August 2014 as president elect of the Royal Institute of British Architects (RIBA), receiving 52% of the vote and became the 75th president of the RIBA on 1 September 2015; Her term of office finished on September 1, 2017, when Ben Derbyshire took over as president following his election.

Duncan trained at The Bartlett, School of Architecture, University College London in the 1970s.

She is director of Jane Duncan Architects which was established in 1992.
