= James Woodford =

English sculptor (1893–1976)

James Arthur Woodford OBE RA (1893–1976) was an English sculptor. His works include sets of bronze doors for the headquarters of the Royal Institute of British Architects and Norwich City Hall; the Queen's Beasts, originally made for the Coronation in 1953, and later replicated in stone, and the statue of Robin Hood outside Nottingham Castle.

== Life ==
Woodford was born in Nottingham on 25 September 1893. His father was a lace designer, who expected his son to follow him into the trade and was opposed to Woodford pursuing a career as an artist. Notoriously, he even threw his son's early sculptures across the room. Despite his father's opposition, Woodford had started studying at the Nottingham School of Art, although his education was curtailed when he enlisted in the Sherwood Foresters during the First World War. After the war, he continued his training at the Royal College of Art in London, and was Rome Scholar in 1922–25.

Woodford designed the bronze doors of the 1930s extension of the Liverpool Blind School in Hope Street. The doors were later transferred to the new Blind School when it moved to Wavertree, a suburb of Liverpool.

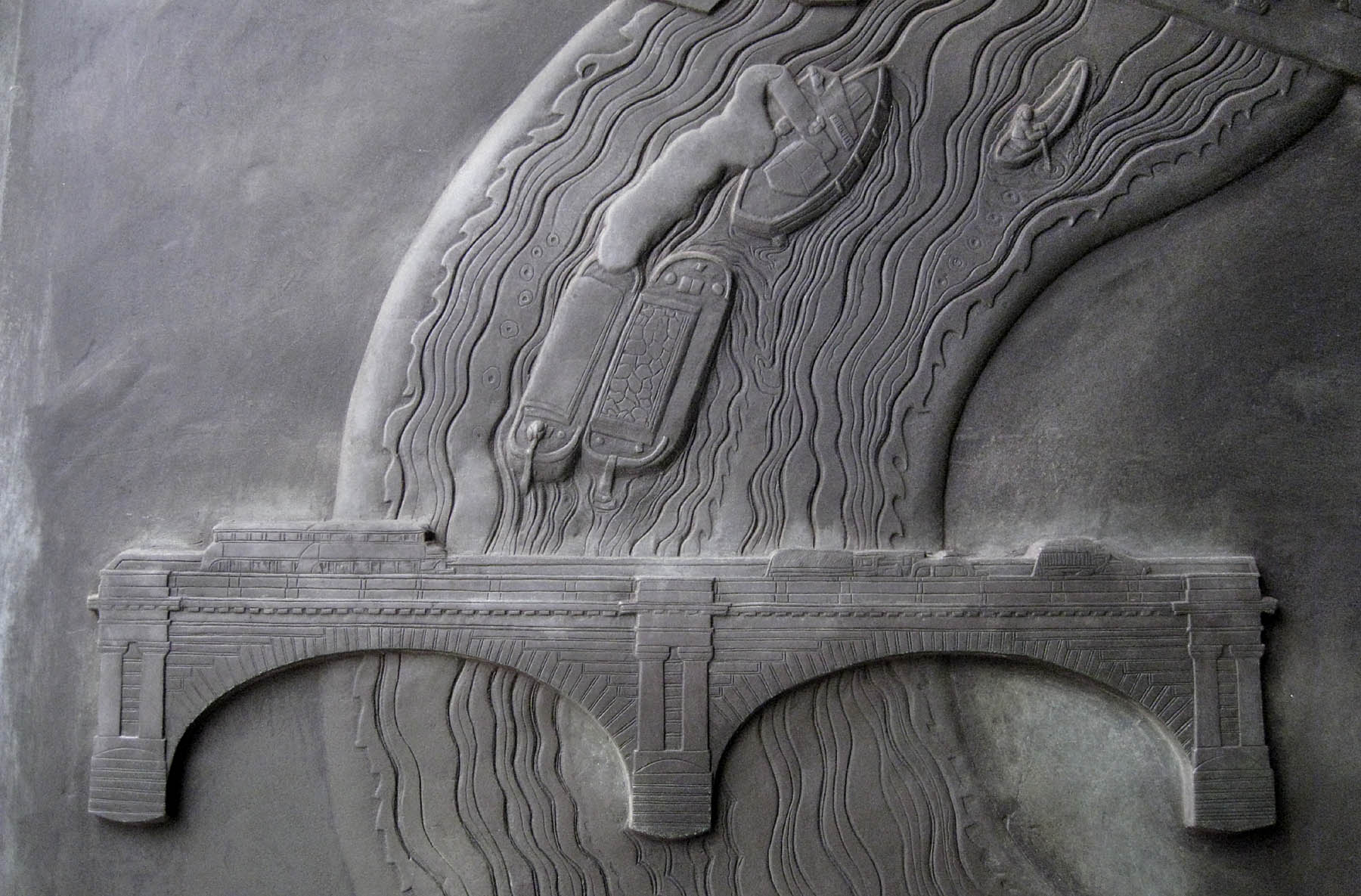
Detail from the doors at 66 Portland Place, London

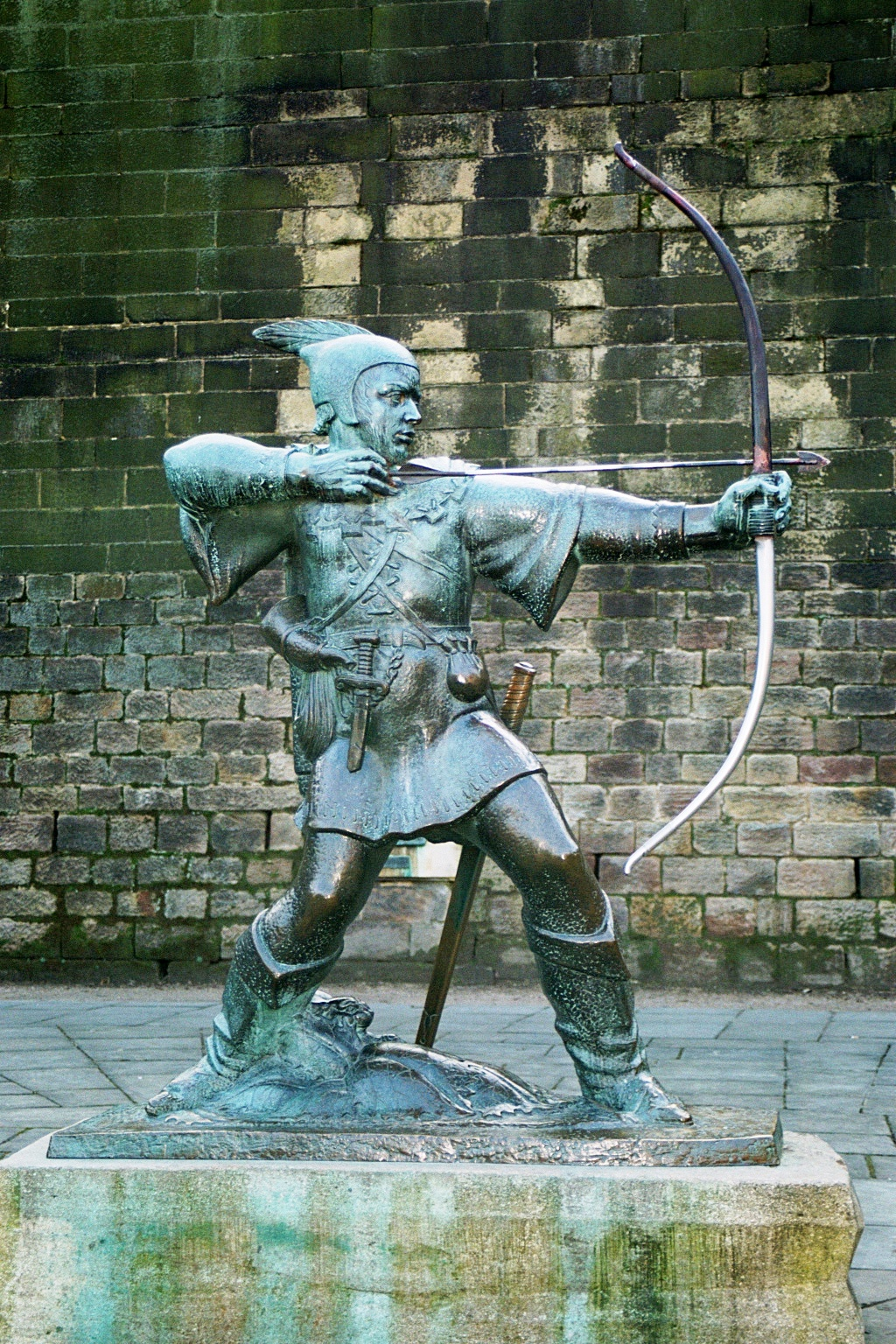
1951 statue of Robin Hood, outside Nottingham Castle

In 1934 Woodford created a monumental pair of doors for the headquarters of the Royal Institute of British Architects at 66 Portland Place, London. They each weigh one-and-a-half tons, the deep relief designs showing the River Thames and various London buildings. He also made figures on the exterior columns, interior ceiling plaster reliefs depicting the main periods of English architecture and various building trades and crafts, and stone window-pieces depicting building through the ages. Four years later he made a set of 18 sculptured roundels for the six bronze doors of Norwich City Hall, depicting the history of the city and manual trades practised there.

He created the sculpture of Ceres, the Roman goddess of agriculture and grain crops, that sits above the portal of The Corn Exchange, Brighton, which was installed in 1934.

Woodford did some decorative work for the liner RMS Queen Mary, carving wooden screens and designing bronze uplighters for the cabin class smoking room. Another commission around this time was for the facade of the fashionably decorated Good Intent restaurant in Chelsea, where he carved large wooden reliefs of a mermaid and two seahorses.

During World War II, Woodford served as a camouflage officer with the Air Ministry. After the war he created a small number of war memorials, most notably for the Court of Honour of the British Medical Association building in Tavistock Square.

For the coronation ceremony of Queen Elizabeth II in 1953, Woodford made a set of ten plaster sculptures of the Queen's Beasts, each 6 feet (1.8 m) tall to be placed at the entrance of Westminster Abbey. He went on to make a set of Portland stone replicas which an anonymous donor presented to Kew Gardens in 1956. They now stand on the Palm House Terrace, while the originals were donated to the collection of the Canadian Museum of History in Gatineau, Quebec, where they remain to this day.

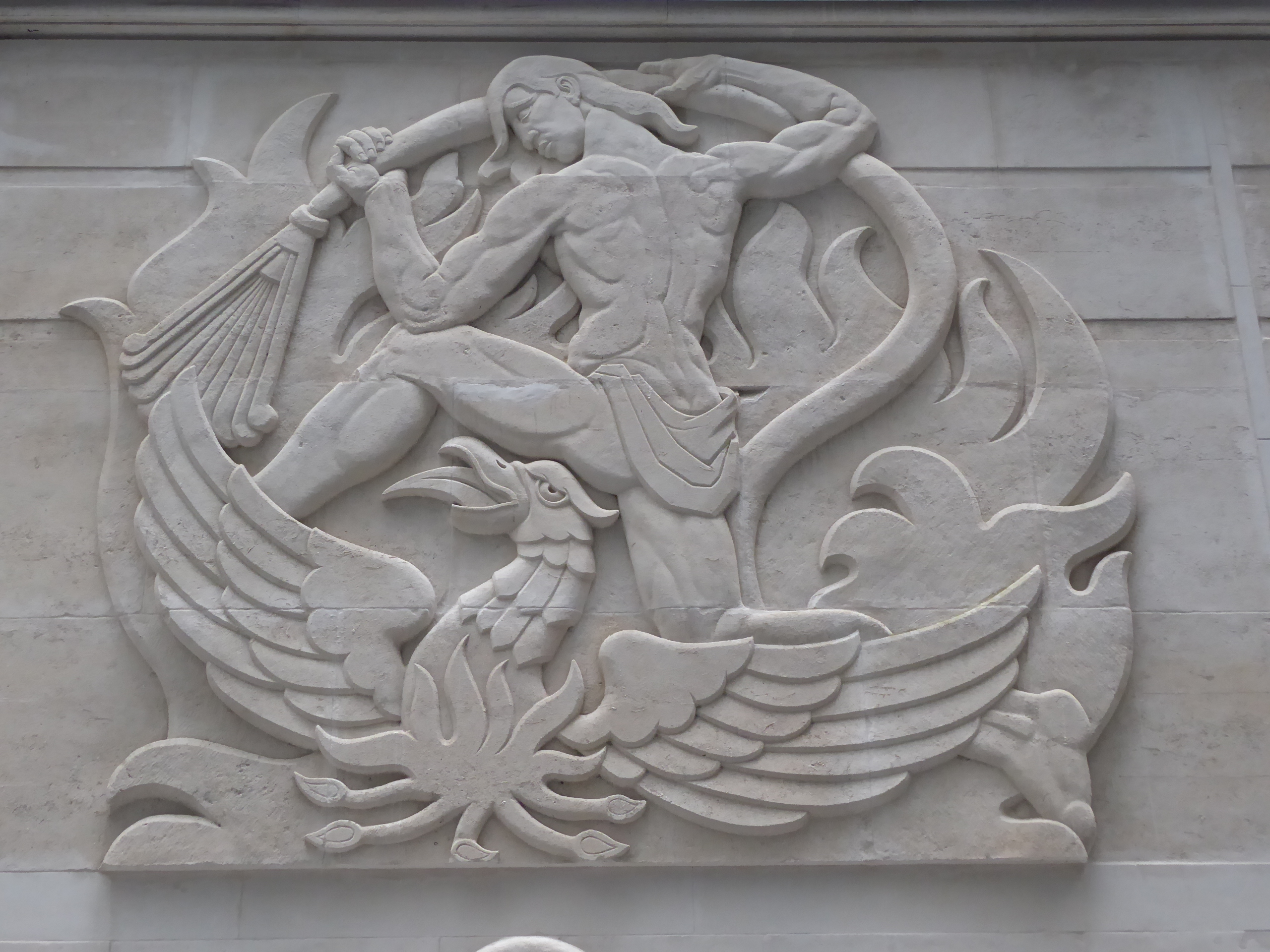
'Fire' James Woodford ‘The Four Elements’ 1952, stone reliefs

In the 1950s Woodford made a set of reliefs representing the four elements for the Lloyds building in Lime Street in the City of London. They were placed very high up; Arthur Byron in London's Statues (1981) describes them as "barely visible." Following the demolition of the building they were installed on a wall at street level as part of the landscaping of the Willis Building on the same site.

In 1951 he made the group of bronze statues of Robin Hood and his Merry Men that stand near the gates of Nottingham Castle. The group is now Grade II listed as part of the historic setting of the castle. In 1962 he modelled a new version of the royal coat of arms for use on major public buildings such as courts and embassies for the Ministry of Public Buildings; the Times said it was "more shapely than the old design, and displays the Lion and Unicorn with greater vigour".

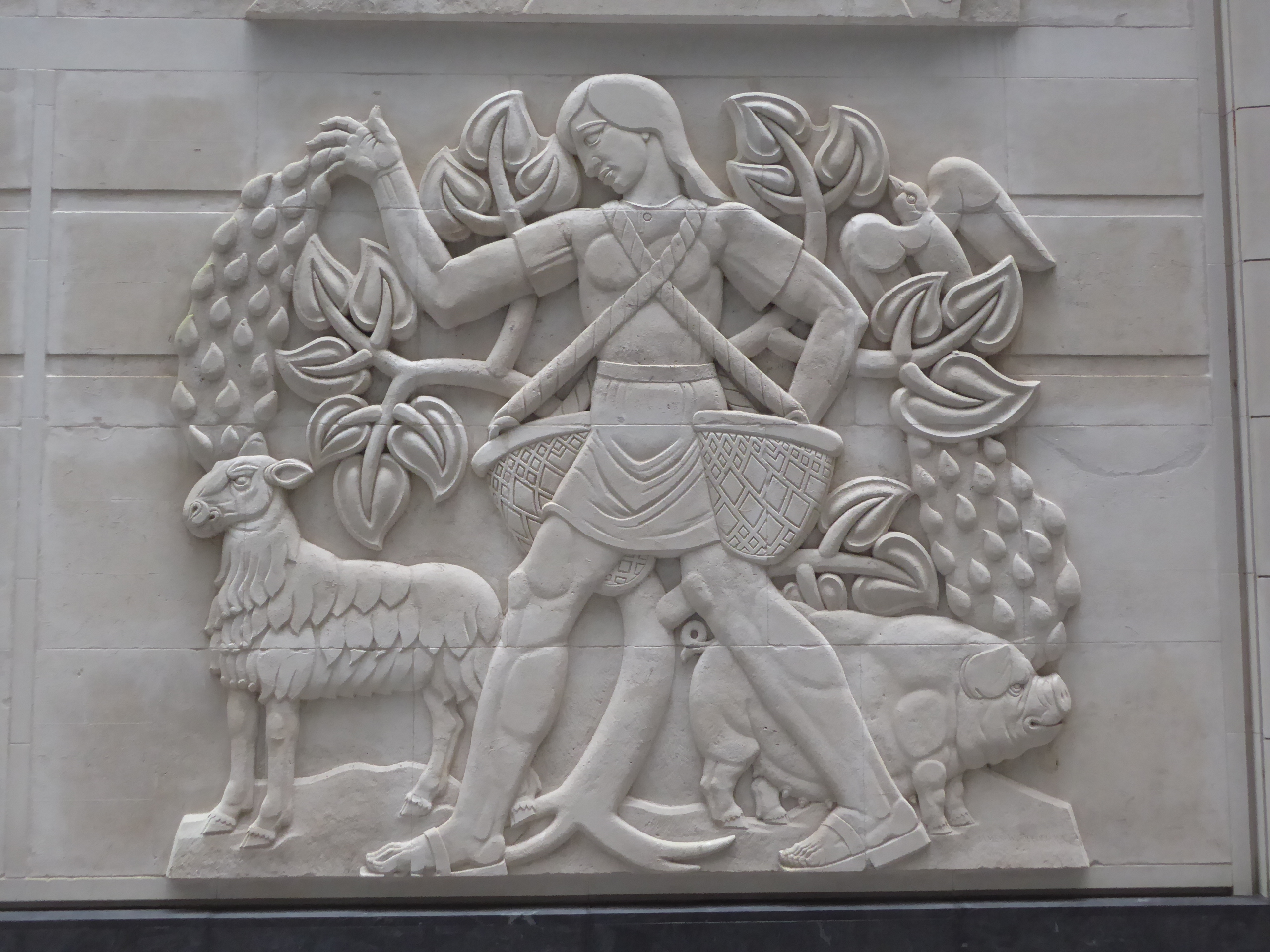
'Earth' James Woodford ‘The Four Elements’ 1952, stone reliefs

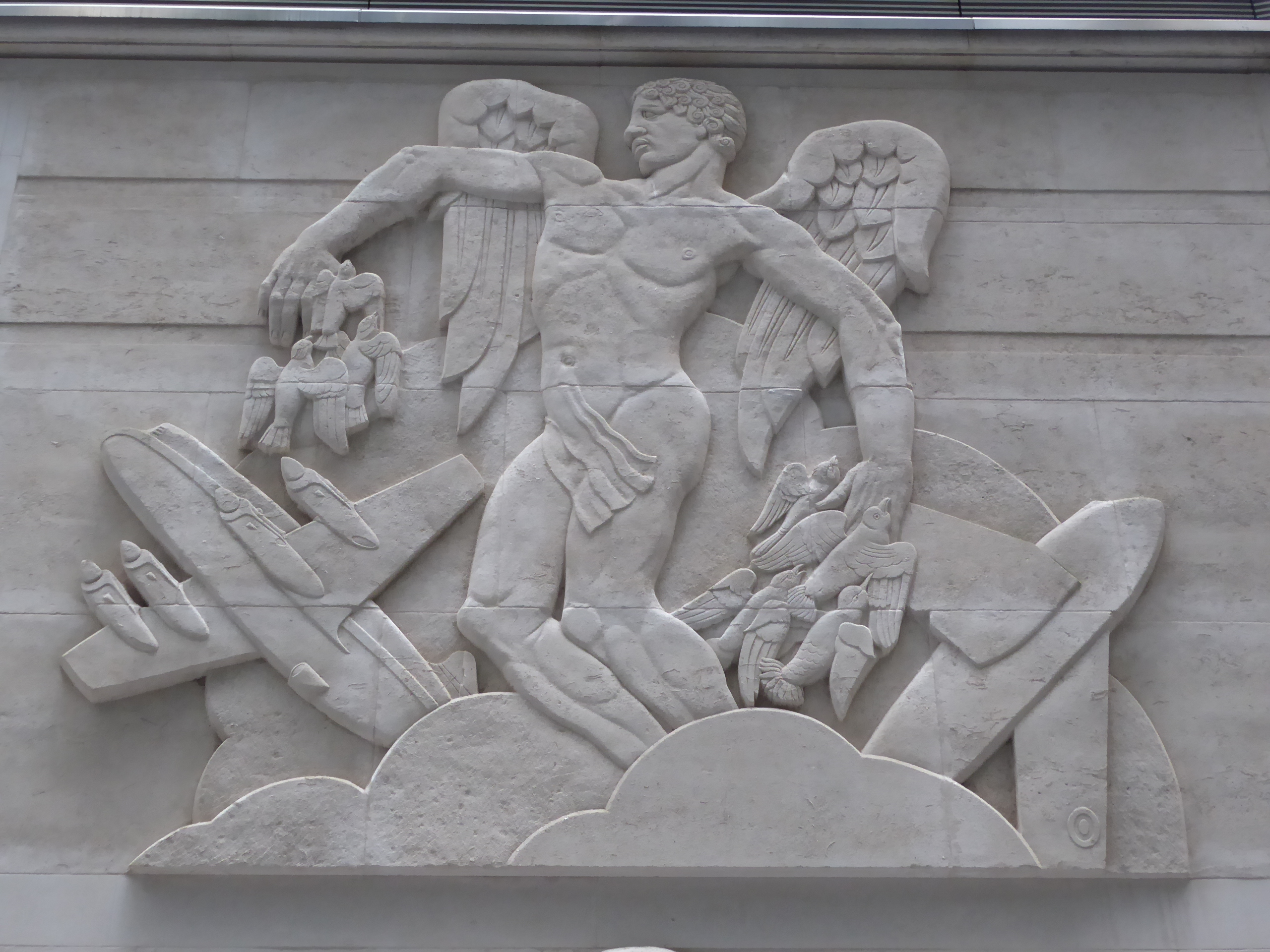
'Air' James Woodford 'The Four Elements' 1952, stone reliefs

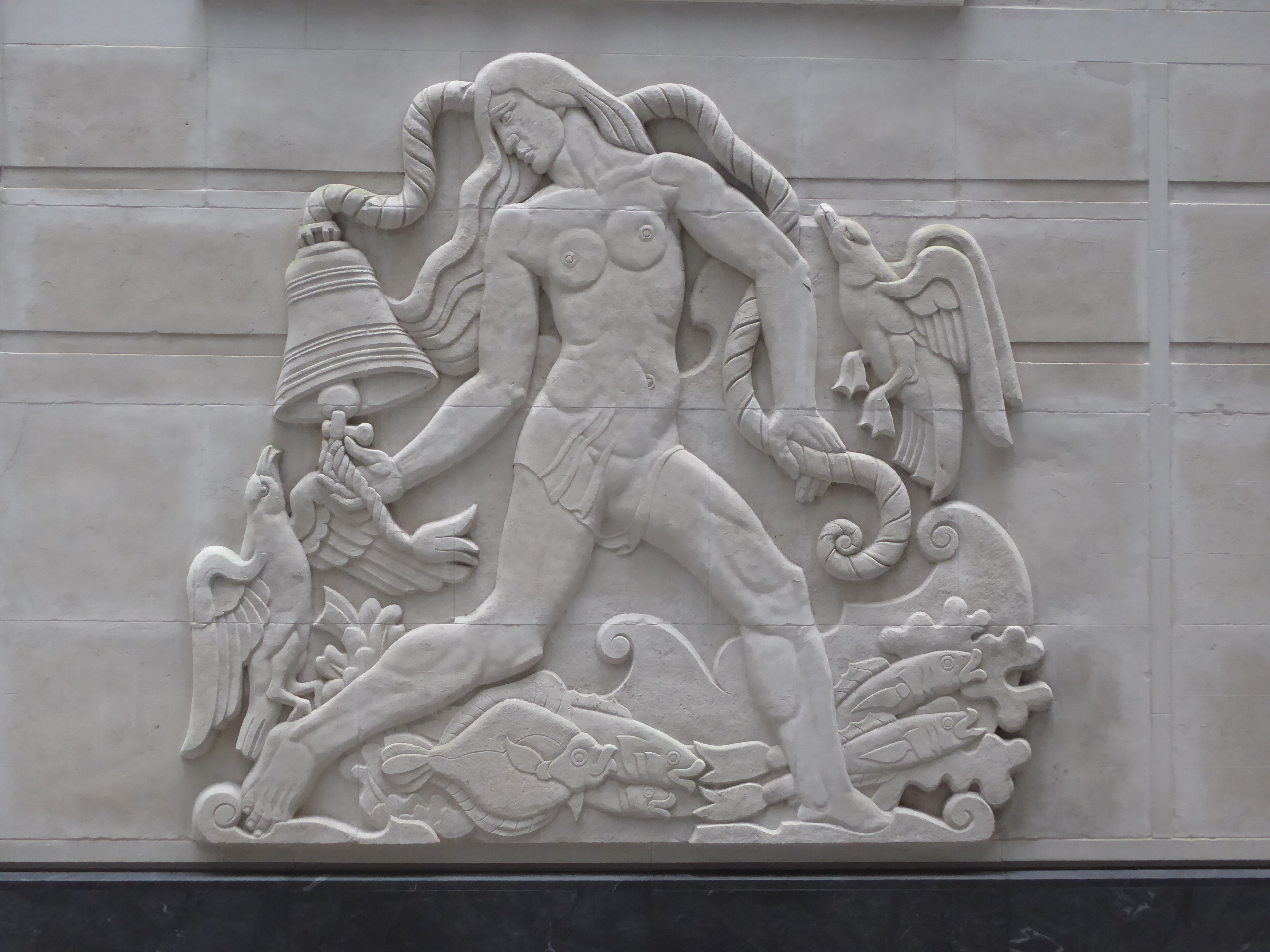
'Water' James Woodford 'The Four Elements' 1952, stone reliefs

He was elected an Associate of the Royal Academy on 2 March 1937 and a full Academician on 27 April 1945, and appointed OBE in the 1953 Coronation Honours. He moved in the early 1970s from Chiswick, west London to Twickenham, where he died on 8 November 1976.
