= North Wales Society of Architects =

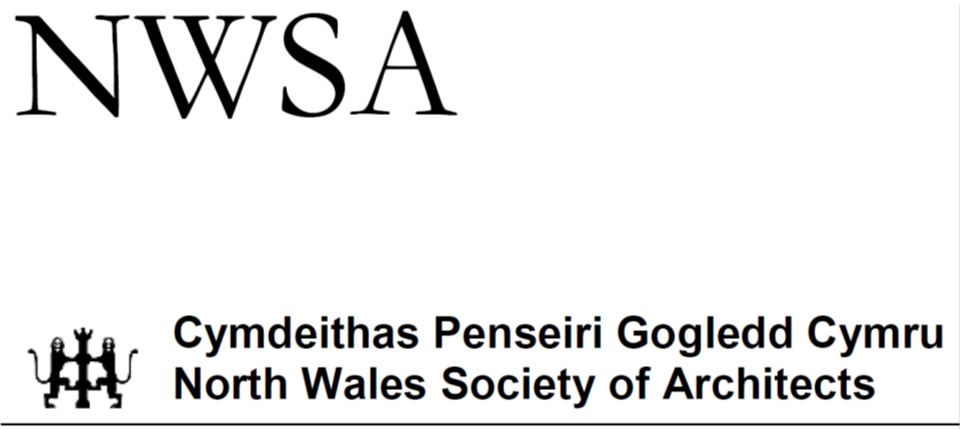
- Abbreviation: NWSA
- Formation: 1928
- Type: Professional body
- Region served: North Wales
- President: David Hughes
- Hon. Secretary: Derwyn Owen
- Hon. Treasurer: Andrew Kelly
- Main organ: NWSA Council
- Affiliations: RSAW, RIBA

The North Wales Society of Architects (NWSA; Welsh: Cymdeithas Penseiri Gogledd Cymru; formerly the North Wales Architectural Society) is one of four branches of the Royal Society of Architects in Wales (RSAW). It was established in 1928 as an independent organisation, becoming a branch of the newly formed Society of Architects in Wales (as the RSAW was initially styled) in 1970 upon the restructuring of the Royal Institute of British Architects (RIBA).

The Society champions better buildings, communities and the environment through architecture and its members. As of 2014 it represented over 120 chartered architects in the region.

The RSAW is the Wales region of the RIBA. RSAW was granted Royal status by the Privy Council in 1994. The society are also members of the Architects Benevolent Society and provide advice for members in the North Wales area.

== Events & publications ==
The Society is noted as being a particularly active branch of the RIBA and organises an annual series of well-attended building visits and lectures, usually held from early autumn through to late spring. In line with NWSA's ethos of promoting architecture to a wider audience, these events are open to non-members and all with an interest in design and architecture.

Visits have included the 2014 Stirling Prize-winning Everyman Theatre, Liverpool, Copper Kingdom, Amlwch, recipient of the RSAW Building of the Year 2014 and Cefn Castell, Criccieth, RSAW Small Project of the Year, 2015.

The society has previously jointly produced the journal, Architecture Wales, with their South Wales counterpart, and as the Chester & North Wales Architectural Society.

== Governance ==
The Society is governed by its elected Council. Councillors are elected for a three-year term at the Society's Annual General Meetings and can serve a maximum of two consecutive terms. Council meets every two months and is led by the Society's President, who serves a maximum two-year term. There is no maximum term for the Society's Honorary Secretary and Honorary Treasurer offices.

== Design Consultation ==
NWSA offers a design review panel to provide impartial expert advice on the quality of designs submitted to local authority Planning Departments across North Wales.

== Regalia ==
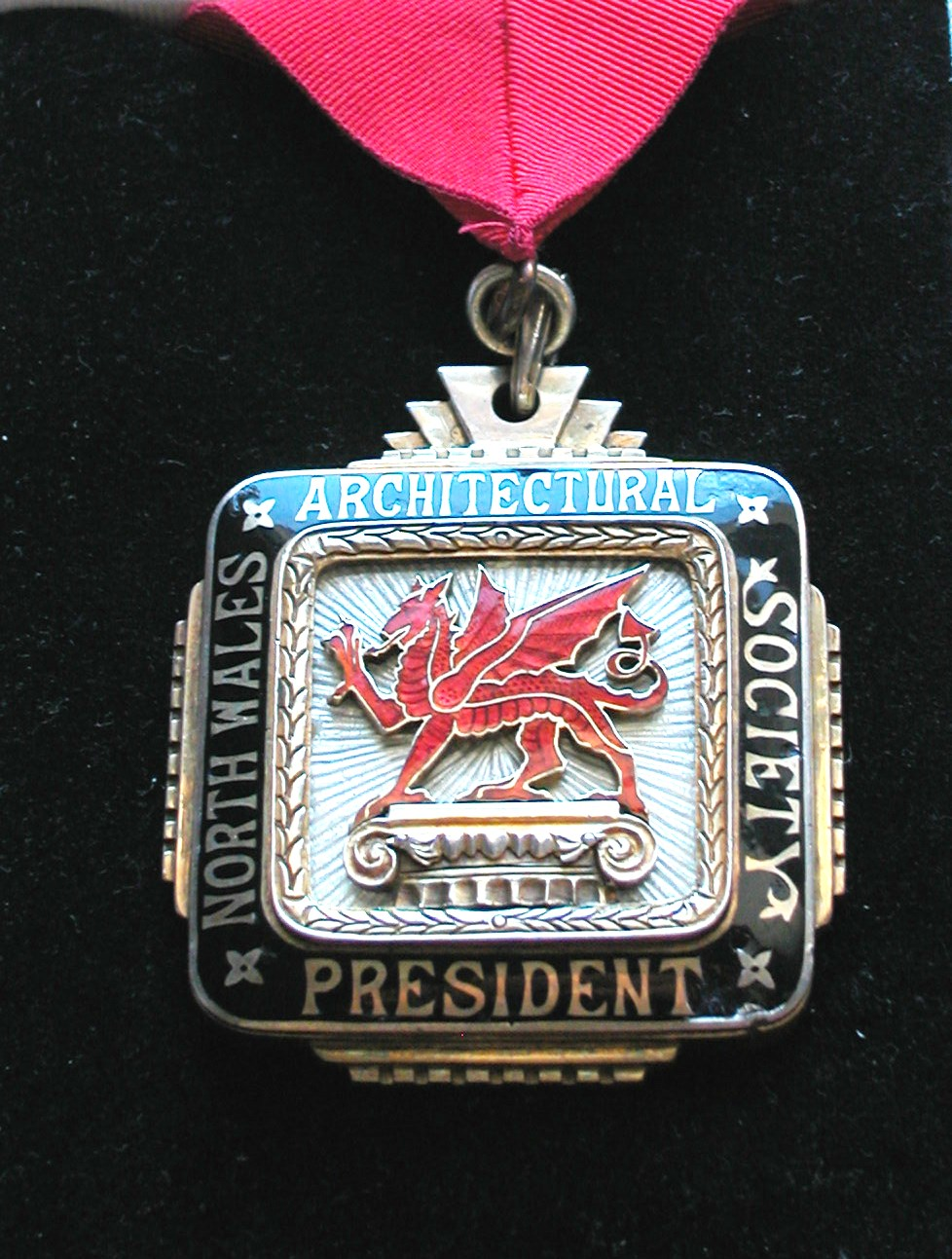
North Wales Society of Architects Presidential Chain of Office

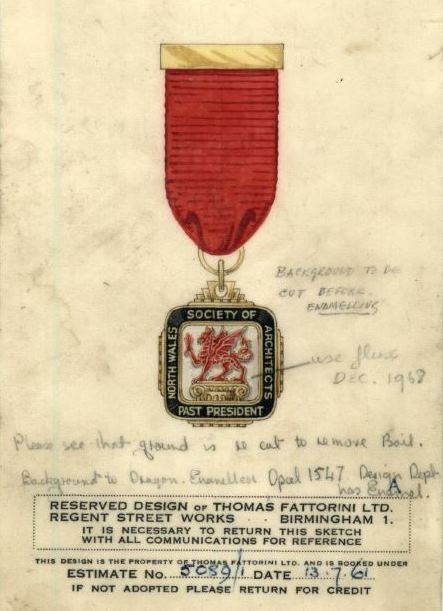
NWSA Past President's Medal

The Society's Presidential Chain of Office was designed in 1954 by Fattorini and Sons of Birmingham of hallmarked sterling silver finished in polished hard gold plate and vitreous enamelled in three colours. Between 1961 and 1994 the Society presented a Past President Medal, similarly designed and produced by Fattorini. This custom was reinstated in 2017.

== Presidents ==
As of February 2024, the Society has been served by 46 presidents in its 97-year history, amongst them many celebrated luminaries of the profession.

Whilst there are inconsistencies in the years in office quoted below, due to Annual General Meetings being held at various times throughout the year, with the exception of the Second World War Presidents have served a single fixed two-year term.

Current President David G Hughes is the first two-time holder of the office.

For consistency and in the interests of historical accuracy, the dates shown are therefore taken directly from the Chain of Office.

- G A Humphreys 1928–1931
- Harold Hughes 1932–1933
- L W Burnett 1934–1935
- R Hall 1936–1937
- Herbert Luck North 1938–1939
- Sidney Colwyn Foulkes 1939–1944
- F A Roberts 1945–1946
- Perceval Mitchell Padmore 1946–1947
- R Parker 1948–1949
- N F Shanks 1950–1951
- L Moseley 1952–1953
- D Hall 1954–1955
- F C Roberts 1956–1957
- N S Johnston 1958–1959
- Antony Clark 1960–1961
- B T Howells 1962–1963
- Stewart Powell Bowen 1964–1965
- Gwilym Parry Davies 1966–1967
- T Summers Davies 1968–1969
- Elizabeth Foulkes 1969–1970
- Eric Langford Lewis 1971–1972
- Frank Dann 1973–1974
- I ap Thomas 1975–1977
- R B Thomas 1977–1979
- R John Howard 1979–1981
- M H Roberts 1981–1983
- Robin Wolley 1983–1985
- Vernon Hughes 1985–1987
- W D (`Gwilym') Evans 1987–1989
- Jonathan W Knox 1989–1991
- Peter G Birkhead 1991–1993
- Richard Pritchard 1993–1995
- Phillip Eyton-Jones 1995–1997
- C P (`Skip') Belton 1997–1999
- Michael E Lavers 1999–2001
- Peter Stonebridge 2001–2003
- Diane Williams 2003–2005
- Mark E French 2005–2008
- Simon P Venables 2008–2011
- J Barrie M Williams 2011–2013
- David G Hughes 2013–2015
- Robert E Gray-Williams 2015–2017
- Barry Hellen 2017–2019
- Derwyn Owen 2019–2021
- Leonie Wainwright 2021–2023
- David G Hughes 2023–

== Honorary Secretaries ==
This list is incomplete; you can help by expanding it.

- G. Parry Davies ?-1964
- Kenneth W. Favell 1965-?

John Williams 1979-1985

- Keith Harwood 1985-?
- Ian T Thomas 1997
- Mark E French ? – 2014
- Leonie Wainwright 2014 – 2016
- Derwyn Owen 2016 – 2018
- Gethin Jones 2018 – 2022
- Derwyn Owen 2023 – 2025
- Mari Evans 2025 -

== Honorary Treasurers ==
This list is incomplete; you can help by expanding it.

- R John Howard 1978
- W D (`Gwilym') Evans 1984
- C P (`Skip') Belton 1994
- J Barrie M Williams 1997 – 2011
- Andrew Kelly 2011 –
