= Royal Incorporation of Architects in Scotland =

Professional association in City of Edinburgh, Scotland

Royal Incorporation of Architects in Scotland logo

The Royal Incorporation of Architects in Scotland (RIAS) is the professional body for architects in Scotland.

== History ==
Previously the (lapsed) Architectural Institute of Scotland, it was re-founded in 1916 as the Incorporation of Architects in Scotland by architect Robert Rowand Anderson (1834–1921) from his sick bed. Anderson donated his Georgian townhouse in Edinburgh to be used as its home, where the organisation still remains. It was given its first Royal charter in 1922, followed by a second in 1929.

Past presidents include leading Scottish architects such as John Keppie, Robert Lorimer, James Dunbar-Nasmith and Jack Coia.

In 2017, a hundred leading Scottish architects demanded a major shake-up of the organisation, describing it as "self-satisfied" and "bunkered" and calling for it be more transparent, inclusive and accountable over its decision-making. Around the same time, a complaint had been made to Police Scotland concerning Neil Baxter, the RIAS's secretary and treasurer since 2008. Baxter left the RIAS in November 2017. A subsequent inquiry by the Office of the Scottish Charity Regulator (OSCR) into the RIAS's governance found that the Incorporation's trustees had failed to adequately oversee Baxter's activities between 2008 and 2017; it found he had "facilitated the misuse of the charity's assets" leading to "clear financial damage and loss, as well as reputational damage, to the charity". The OSCR, however, also noted that governance improvements had since been implemented by the RIAS.

In June 2024 Karen Anderson, founder of Anderson Bell Christie and a former chair of Architecture and Design Scotland, became president.

== Organisation ==
The Incorporation is an independent body representing architects working in Scotland although it consults regularly with the Royal Institute of British Architects (RIBA) and the Architects Registration Board regarding UK-wide professional issues. It lobbies Scottish Ministers and the Scottish Government directly on relevant issues including building safety, environmental legislation, and design standards.

The Incorporation is run by an elected National Council comprising representatives of individual chapters and nationally elected members. The National Council is supported by a range of specialist committees and working groups including:

- Finance and Audit
- Governance
- Professional Practice
- Contracts and Appointments
- Conservation
- Planning
- Sustainability
- Education

The RIAS comprises six chapters across Scotland:

- Aberdeen Society of Architects (ASA)
- Dundee Institute of Architects (DIA)
- Edinburgh Architectural Association (EAA)
- Glasgow Institute of Architects (GIA)
- Inverness Architectural Association (IAA)
- Stirling Society of Architects (SSA)

Membership is available to anyone registered as an architect who lives and works in Scotland.

The Incorporation offers accreditation in specialist fields including historic building conservation and environmental sustainability.

== RIAS Award for Architecture ==
The RIAS award was founded in 2002 by the architect Andrew Doolan, whose work included the Point Hotel in Edinburgh. The award is given to the best new building in Scotland, as judged by a jury of assessors. The value of the prize is £25,000, making it the largest prize for architecture in the UK. Initially the prize money came from Doolan, but following his death in 2004 there were doubts as to whether the award could continue. The responsibility now lies with his mother Mrs Margaret Doolan who now patronises the award and from 2005 the award has been renamed the "RIAS Andrew Doolan Award for Architecture" in his memory. Winners have included: the Enric Miralles' Scottish Parliament building; Bennetts Associates' University of Edinburgh Informatics Forum; and Reiach & Hall's Pier Arts Centre in Orkney. The Maggie's Centres in Dundee, Kirkcaldy and Inverness have all been nominated, with the one in Inverness by Page\Park Architects winning the award in 2006.

== Fellows of the RIAS ==
For notable elected Fellows of the Royal Incorporation of Architects in Scotland (FRIAS) see Category:Fellows of the Royal Incorporation of Architects in Scotland.

== RIAS Publishing ==
RIAS publications include a series of architectural guides covering Scotland aimed at the general reader. Although smaller in size and more limited in scope, the aims are similar to Nikolaus Pevsner's eponymous series of Architectural Guides to England, Scotland, Wales and Ireland. Some volumes were published under RIAS's imprint, The Rutland Press. Others were co-published with Mainstream Publishing. Several volumes (marked *) have been updated as new editions, but not all volumes are currently in print.

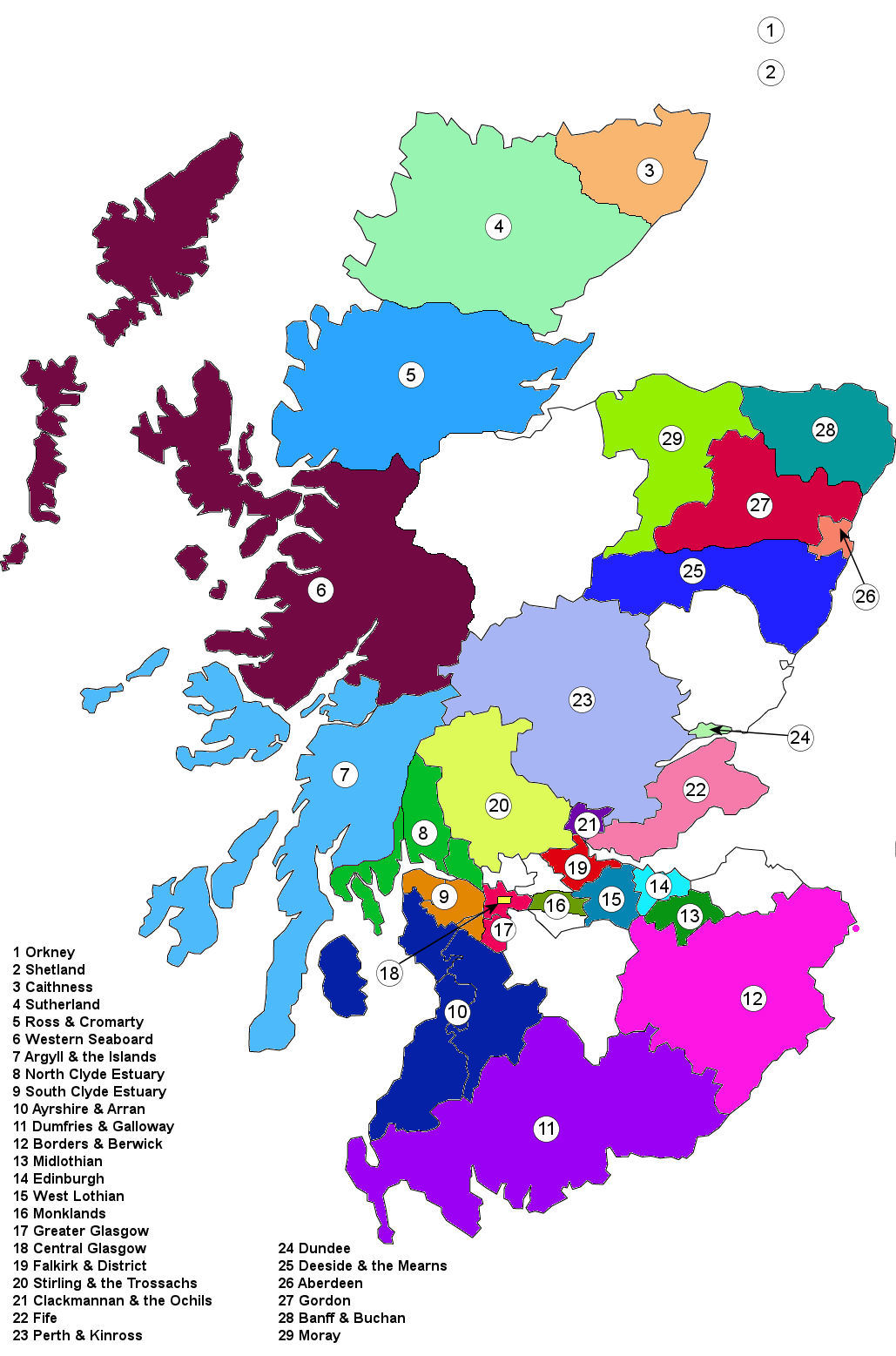
Map showing coverage of the RIAS Guidebooks as of April 2014

- Aberdeen* (W.A. Brogden) (2012)
- Aberdeenshire: Donside & Strathbogie* [previously published as Gordon] (Ian Shepherd) (2006)
- Argyll and the Islands [including Islay, Jura, Mull, Iona, Coll, Tiree, Colonsay, Gigha but excluding Coastal Cowal] (Frank Arneil Walker) (2003)
- Ayrshire & Arran (Rob Close) (1992)
- Banff & Buchan (Charles McKean) (1990)
- Borders and Berwick [including the former Borough of Berwick-upon-Tweed in England, excluding Wooler] (Charles A Strang) (1994)
- Caithness (Elizabeth Beaton) (1996)
- Clackmannan & The Ochils* (Adam Swan) (2001)
- Deeside & The Mearns (Jane Geddes) (2001)
- Dumfries & Galloway (John Hume) (2000)
- Dundee* (Charles McKean and David Walker) (1993)
- Edinburgh* (Charles McKean) (1992)
- Falkirk and District (Richard Jaques) (2000)
- The Kingdom of Fife* (Glen Pride) (1999)
- Central Glasgow* [The city north of the Clyde, from the Botanic Gardens to the Cathedral] (Charles McKean, David Walker and Frank Arneil Walker) (1993)
- Greater Glasgow [including the eastern half of East Renfrewshire] (Sam Small) (2008)
- Midlothian (Jane Thomas) (1995)
- Monklands (Allan Peden) (1992)
- Moray (Charles McKean) (1987)
- North Clyde Estuary [Coastal Cowal, Bute and West Dunbartonshire] (Frank Arneil Walker and Fiona Sinclair) (1992)
- Orkney (Leslie Burgher) (1991)
- Perth & Kinross (Nick Haynes) (2000)
- Ross & Cromarty (Elizabeth Beaton) (1992)
- Shetland (Mike Finnie) (1990)
- South Clyde Estuary [Inverclyde, Renfrewshire and the western half of East Renfrewshire] (Frank Arneil Walker) (1986)
- Stirling & The Trossachs (Charles McKean) (1985)
- Sutherland (Elizabeth Beaton) (1995)
- West Lothian (Richard Jaques and Charles McKean) (1994)
- Western Seaboard [Western Isles, Lochaber, Skye, Rum, Eigg, Canna and Muck] (Mary Miers) (2008)

Forthcoming

- Angus
- East Lothian
- Inverness, Nairn, Badenoch & Strathspey
- Lanarkshire
- Kilsyth, Cumbernauld & the Campsies

== See also ==
- RIBA
- RSUA
- List of architecture prizes
