= Statue of Robin Hood =

Statue in Nottingham, England

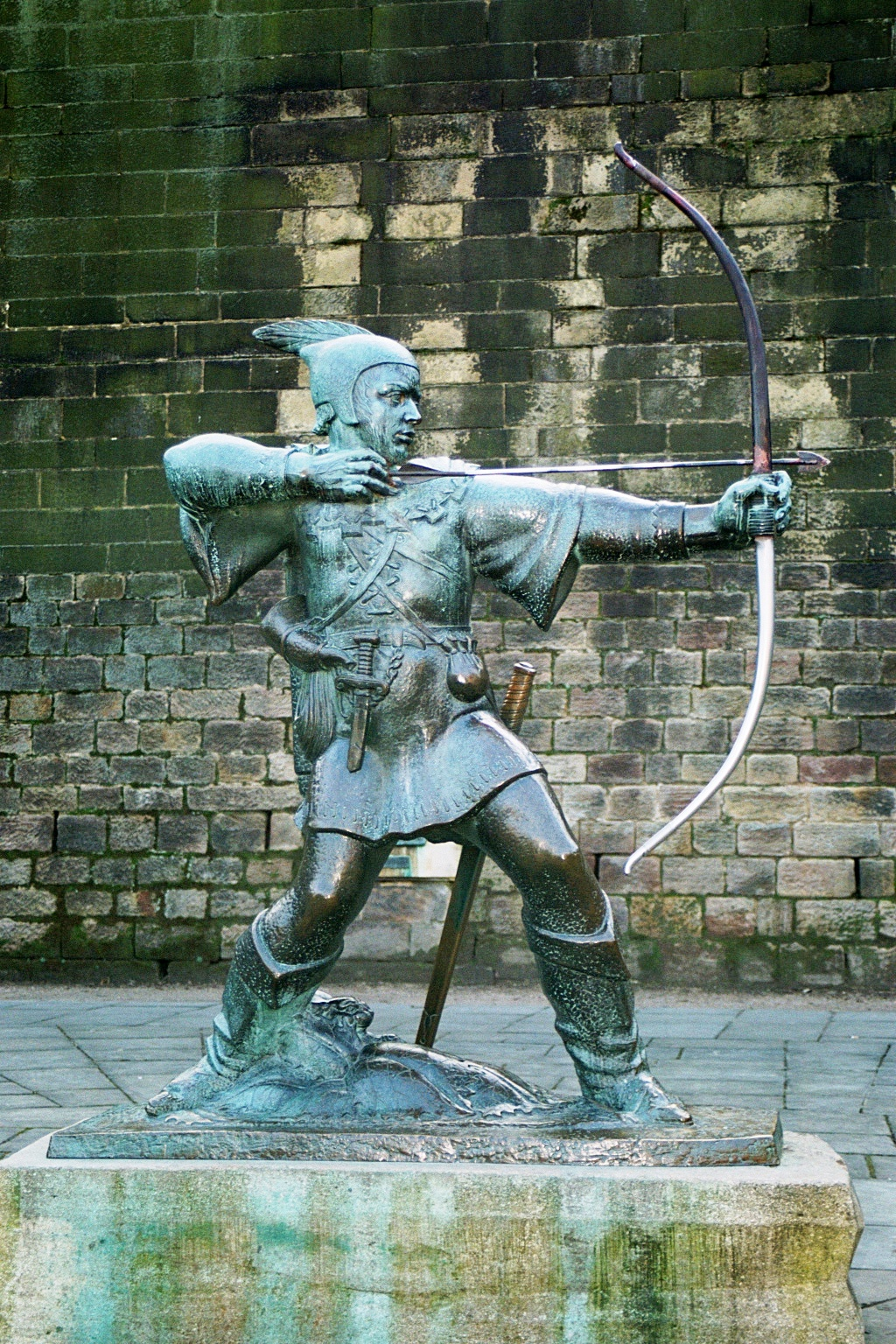
- Artist: James Woodford
- Year: 1952
- Medium: Bronze
- Subject: Robin Hood
- Location: Nottingham, England

Listed Building – Grade II
- Official name: Statues of Robin Hood and his Merry Men
- Designated: 6 November 2018
- Reference no.: 1454561

A statue of Robin Hood is installed at Nottingham Castle, in Nottingham, England. The sculpture was unveiled in 1952 and is the work of James Woodford, who also sculpted The Queen's Beasts.

== Gallery ==
Flag of Nottinghamshire, adopted in 2011, which includes a silhouette of the statue

Another design considered for the flag of Nottinghamshire in 2011, also featuring a silhouette of the statue
