= 66 Portland Place =

Coordinates: 51°31′16.3″N 0°8′42.2″W

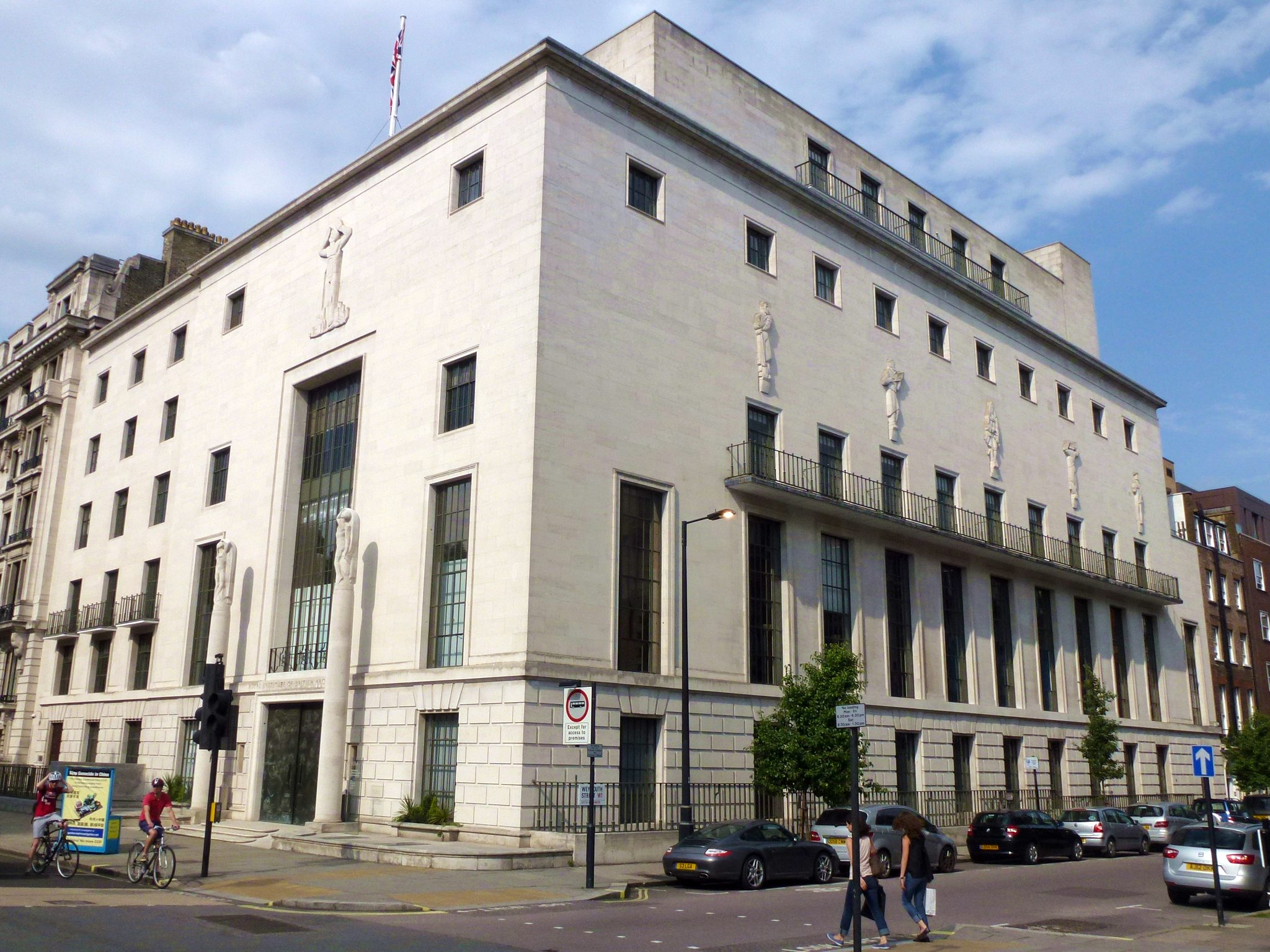
- Interactive map of the 66 Portland Place area

General information
- Architectural style: Art Deco, Neoclassical
- Location: Portland Place, London, United Kingdom
- Current tenants: Royal Institute of British Architects
- Construction started: 1932
- Completed: 1934
- Cost: Approx

Design and construction
- Architect: George Grey Wornum

66 Portland Place is an office building in Marylebone in Central London, near the boundary with Fitzrovia. Located on the corner of Portland Place and Weymouth Street, it serves as the headquarters of the Royal Institute of British Architects ("RIBA").

== History ==
RIBA had been housed at 9 Conduit Street from 1859. However, the growth of the institute had necessitated a move to larger quarters, with a competition being announced in 1929 to design a new RIBA building. The commission attracted 284 entries; a high number compared to the comparative modesty of the construction, but perhaps not surprising given the building's future purpose. The winning design was by George Grey Wornum.

Construction began in 1932, with the foundation stone laid on 28 June 1933 by Thomas, Lord Howard de Walden, a noted patron of the arts. The building was officially opened on 8 November 1934 by the then King and Queen, George V and Mary.

On 14 September 1970, thirty-seven years after its construction, the building was listed grade II* (the second highest category in England and Wales).

In 2012 the Royal Institute of British Architects began a feasibility study about amending or moving out of the building. In 2024, the RIBA announced a £85 million refurbishment by Benedetti Architects, with the building due to close from 1 June 2025 for two and a half years.

== Architecture ==
The building is designed primarily in the Art Deco style, blended with late neoclassical (also known as Imperial Neoclassical, after the works of Sir Edwin Lutyens and Sir Herbert Baker). Externally, the Art Deco elements manifest themselves in the bronze doors, architectural motifs, and trans-storey main window. The rustication and bay-regularity exhibit the elements of classicism.
