= Royal Society of Architects in Wales =

RIBA region

The Royal Society of Architects in Wales (RSAW) is the Wales region of the Royal Institute of British Architects (RIBA). The society was granted Royal status by the Privy Council in 1994.

It is based in Cardiff, with four branches throughout Wales; Design Circle (RSAW South), Mid Wales Branch, North Wales Society of Architects and West Wales Branch. In 2007 the Society represented around 800 architects in Wales.

RSAW regularly organises competitions to highlight good architecture in Wales. In 2012 it held a competition entitled ReDesigning the Terrace, with the 12 shortlisted entries displayed at its conference in December 2012.

== Recent presidents ==
- 1977-1979: Dale Owen
- ? Maureen Kelly Owen
- 2003–2005: Ruth Reed
- 2005–2007: Jonathan Adams
- 2007–2009: Gareth Scourfield
- 2009–2011: Pierre Wassenaar
- 2011–2013: Andrew Sutton
- 2013–2015: Dan Benham
- 2015–2017: Robert Firth
- 2017–2019: Carolyn Merrifield
- 2019–2021 : Ryan Stuckey
- 2021–2023 : Gavin Traylor
- 2023–2025: Dan Benham
- 2025–2027: Alan Francis
