= Architecture Today =

British architecture magazine

- Editor: Isabel Allen
- Staff writers: John Ramshaw, Jason Sayer, Ian Volner
- Categories: Architecture
- Frequency: Ten times per year
- Circulation: 12,150 (ABC 2018)
- Publisher: Built Environment & Architectural Media Ltd
- Founded: 1989
- Country: United Kingdom
- Based in: London
- Language: English
- Website: www.architecturetoday.co.uk
- ISSN: 0958-6407

Architecture Today is an independently published British architecture magazine, founded in 1989. Largely comprising in-depth building studies, it is published ten times per annum and is available free-of-charge to Architects Registration Board-registered architects via controlled circulation subscriptions.

The magazine operates both online and in print, running events such as online webinars, CPDs, and in-person panel discussions on all matters concerning the built environment.

The Architecture Today Awards are given to buildings that provide long-term ecological, functional, social and cultural benefits. These awards exclusively consider projects in use for at three or more years.
