= Northwest Service Academy =

Northwest Service Academy (NWSA) was an AmeriCorps program in the Pacific Northwest which focused on environmental service. The program ended in 2010 when the Americorps grant was not renewed. Northwest Service Academy ran from 1994, as an Americorps program in the inaugural year, to 2010.

Northwest Service Academy partnered with more than 250 schools, community-based organizations and government agencies to address significant environmental issues in the states of Alaska, Idaho, Oregon and Washington.

NWSA projects typically addressed critical environmental needs through hands-on environmental restoration, resource conservation, environmental education, environmental stewardship or volunteer programs.

NWSA was located in the Pacific Northwest, one of the most environmentally rich corners of the Earth. The region abounds with natural wonders; from the snow-capped mountains of the Cascades to the rugged Pacific Ocean coast, from the remote outback of the high desert to the mystical waterfalls of the Columbia River Gorge.

== AmeriCorps Positions ==
There are three types of positions in which AmeriCorps members could serve with NWSA: Leaders, Individual Placements, and Field Teams.

A group of Individual Placement members in a team building activity

A NWSA Field Team member does routine tool upkeep.

=== Leaders ===
Leaders played a dynamic role that requires a strong ethic of service, great communication skills, a desire to continually refine their leadership skills and the ability to balance the needs of team members, project sponsors and NWSA. Leaders were responsible for facilitating the creation of a strong and collaborative team, advocating for member needs, assisting NWSA staff with member-based issues, coordinating team meetings and trainings, and ensuring that the team completes all service related paperwork. Stewards and leaders usually served alongside their team, coordinating with sponsors to ensure that the team's service meets the project needs in a safe and effective manner.

=== Individual placements ===
Individual placements were placed with local schools, community-based organizations and government agencies. They were usually placed one per sponsoring organization and serve with that same sponsor for their entire term of service. NWSA projects were developed by project sponsors and selected through a competitive process. IP service activities varied from site to site, and generally focused on one or more of the following areas: restoring watersheds, enhancing public lands, conserving resources, increasing awareness through environmental education, increasing community stewardship and volunteerism, providing educational support, and strengthening communities.

=== Field teams ===
Field teams were made up of 4–10 members and usually include a Leader. Team projects were based on the needs of the communities being served, and often involve collaborating with local watershed groups, government agencies, non-profit organizations, community groups and schools. Field team projects often had a restoration, environmental education or community revitalization focus, and could have involved activities such as wildlife habitat restoration, building riparian fences, trail building and rehabilitation, salmon habitat rehabilitation, planting trees in natural and urban areas, non-native species removal, public education and outreach, and community enhancement projects.

== See also ==
- Sustainability
- Biodiversity
- Ecology
- Conservation movement
