= RIBA Product Selector =

- Language: English
- Subject: Trade directory
- Published: RIBA Enterprises
- Publication place: United Kingdom
- Media type: Print; On-line
- ISBN: 9780907125556
- OCLC: 786209061
- Followed by: NBS Source

RIBA Product Selector was a directory of construction product manufacturers and advisory organisations used by architects and other construction industry professionals to specify building products. The product was retired in July 2020, and how now been replaced by NBS Source.

== Background ==
RIBA Product Selector was a two-volume hardback directory of construction product manufacturers, service providers and advisory organisations for specifying building materials published by the commercial arm of the RIBA, RIBA Enterprises (now known as NBS Enterprises Ltd). It was published on an annual basis and distributed to construction professionals who register. It had an ABC audited circulation for the 2012 edition of 20,077 (Visit www.a.org.uk for further details) and was categorised according to the CI/SfB classification system. It contained approximately 700 structured technical pages of building product information organised according to BS 4940 structure for technical literature.

RIBA Product Selector had a corresponding website which was aimed building products library aimed at UK construction industry professionals looking to research and source products, product catalogues, technical documents and contact information from approximately 10,000 manufacturers, suppliers, distributors and trade associations. It also contained detailed product information linked to the National Building Specification (NBS), as well as case studies and images of key construction products, which it charges manufacturers to list.

In July 2020, RIBA Product Selector was replaced by NBS Source, which merged three of the NBS's flagship products: RIBA Product Selector, NBS Plus and NBS National BIM Library to create a single source for building product information with improved search functionality, structured data and synchronisation to NBS's flagship product for specification writing, NBS Chorus.
