= Royal Institute of British Architects =

UK professional body for architects

- Abbreviation: RIBA
- Formation: 1834; 192 years ago
- Type: Professional membership body
- Legal status: Chartered body corporate and registered charity
- Purpose: Advancement of architecture and promotion of acquiring of knowledge of the arts and sciences connected therewith.
- Headquarters: 66 Portland Place, London, W1 (from 2025, RIBA HQ is temporarily in Tavistock Square)
- Coordinates: 51°31′17″N 0°8′42″W
- Region served: Predominantly UK with increasing global membership
- Members: 29,203 chartered architects (2020)
- Chief Executive: Valerie Vaughan-Dick
- President: Chris Williamson
- Main organ: RIBA Board and RIBA Council
- Staff: 270 (2025)
- Website: riba.org

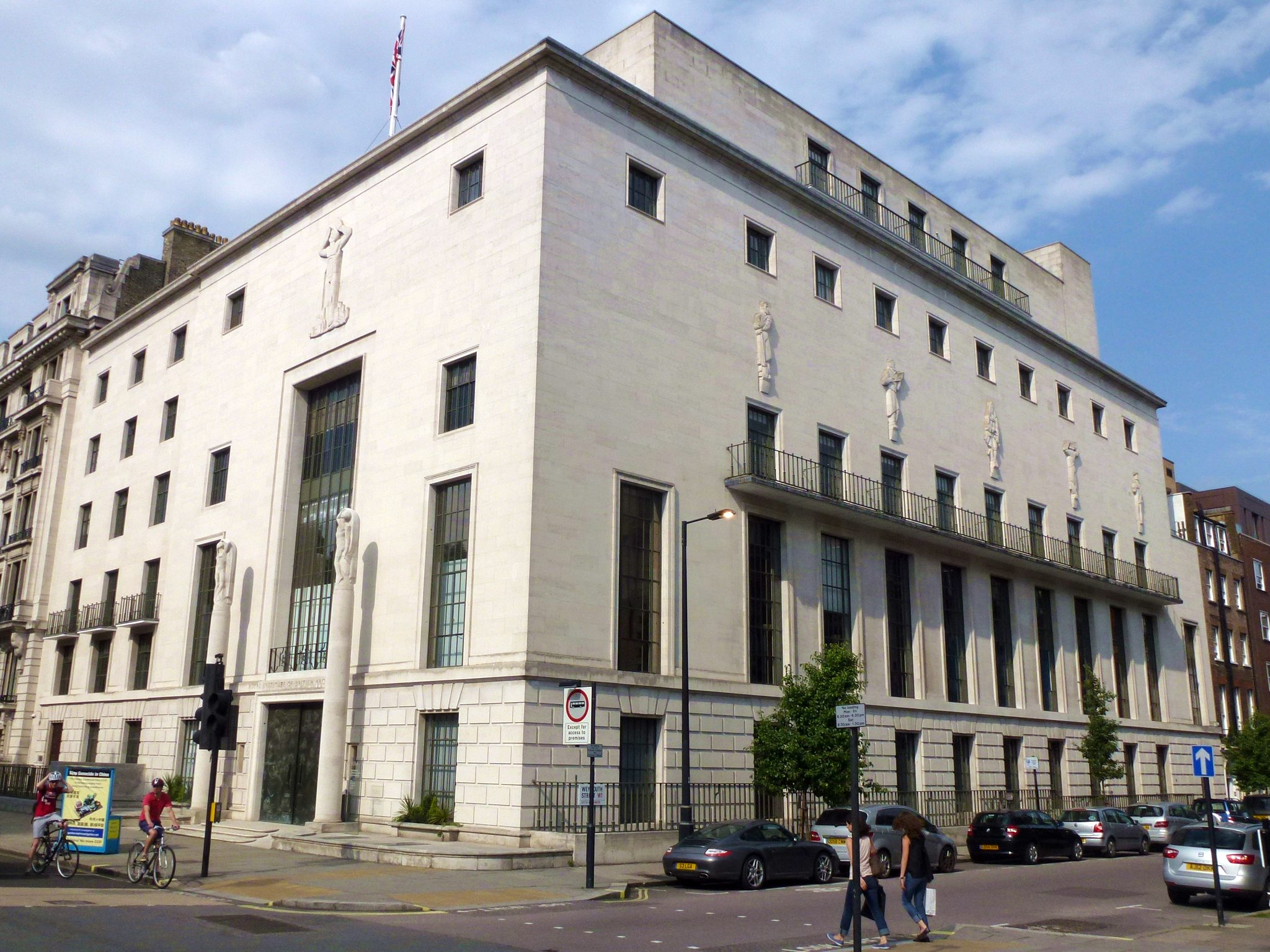
RIBA Headquarters

The Royal Institute of British Architects (RIBA) is a professional body for architects primarily in the United Kingdom, but also internationally, founded for the advancement of architecture under its royal charter granted in 1837, three supplemental charters and a new charter granted in 1971.

Founded as the Institute of British Architects in London in 1834, RIBA has a central London office (temporarily moved from 66 Portland Place from mid-2025 due to building refurbishment work) as well as a network of regional offices. Its members played a leading part in promotion of architectural education in the United Kingdom; the RIBA Library, also established in 1834, is one of the three largest architectural libraries in the world and the largest in Europe. RIBA also played a prominent role in the development of UK architects' registration bodies.

The institute administers some of the oldest architectural awards in the world, including RIBA President's Medals Students Award, the Royal Gold Medal, and the Stirling Prize. It also manages RIBA Competitions, organising architectural and other design-related competitions.

The RIBA was historically a male-dominated body, first admitting women members in 1898, and appointing its first female president in 2009. Sometimes perceived as a London-centric organisation, it has also been accused of lacking transparency.

== History ==
RIBA logo used until 2025

Originally named the Institute of British Architects in London, it was formed in 1834 by several prominent architects, including Decimus Burton, Philip Hardwick, Thomas Allom, William Donthorne, Thomas Leverton Donaldson, William Adams Nicholson, John Buonarotti Papworth, and Thomas de Grey, 2nd Earl de Grey. The latter served as the institute's first president for 25 years until his death in 1859.

After the grant of the royal charter it had become known as the Royal Institute of British Architects in London, eventually dropping the reference to London in 1892. In 1934, it moved to its current headquarters on Portland Place, with the building being opened by King George V and Queen Mary.

=== Royal charter ===
It was granted its Royal charter in 1837 under King William IV. Supplemental charters of 1887, 1909 and 1925 were replaced by a single charter in 1971, and there have been minor amendments since then.

The original charter of 1837 set out the purpose of the Royal Institute to be: '... the general advancement of Civil Architecture, and for promoting and facilitating the acquirement of the knowledge of the various arts and sciences connected therewith...'

The RIBA's operational framework is provided by its byelaws, which are more frequently updated than the charter. Any revisions to the charter or byelaws require the approval of the Privy Council.

The RIBA is a registered charity (number 210566) and has at least twice referred itself to the Charity Commission – over governance issues in 2020, and in 2026 in relation to a potential fraud first reported in 2023.

=== Motto ===
The design of the institute's Mycenaean lions medal and the Latin motto Usui civium, decori urbium has been attributed to Thomas Leverton Donaldson, who had been honorary secretary until 1839. The RIBA Guide to its Archive and History (Angela Mace,1986) records that the first official version of the badge of the Lion Gate at Mycenae was used as a bookplate for the institute's library and publications from 1835 to 1891, when it was redesigned by J. H. Metcalfe. It was again redesigned in 1931 by Eric Gill and in 1960 by Joan Hassall. The description in the 1837 by-laws was: "gules, two lions rampant guardant or, supporting a column marked with lines chevron, proper, all standing on a base of the same; a garter surrounding the whole with the inscription Institute of British Architects, anno salutis MDCCCXXXIV; above a mural crown proper, and beneath the motto Usui civium decori urbium ". The motto is translated "for the use of the people, for the glory of the city".

=== Architectural education ===
In the nineteenth and twentieth centuries the RIBA and its members had a leading part in the promotion of architectural education in the United Kingdom, including the establishment of the Architects' Registration Council of the United Kingdom (ARCUK) and the Board of Architectural Education under the Architects (Registration) Acts, 1931 to 1938. A member of the RIBA, Lionel Bailey Budden, then Associate Professor in the Liverpool University School of Architecture, had contributed the article on Architectural Education published in the fourteenth edition of the Encyclopædia Britannica (1929). His School, Liverpool, was one of the twenty schools named for the purpose of constituting the statutory Board of Architectural Education when the 1931 Act was passed.

Soon after the passing of the 1931 Act, in the book published on the occasion of the institute's centenary celebration in 1934, Harry Barnes, FRIBA, Chairman of the Registration Committee, mentioned that ARCUK could not be a rival of any architectural association, least of all the RIBA, given the way ARCUK was constituted. Barnes commented that the Act's purpose was not protecting the architectural profession, and that the legitimate interests of the profession were best served by the (then) architectural associations in which some 80 per cent of those practising architecture were to be found.

The RIBA Guide to its Archive and History (1986) has a section on the "Statutory registration of architects" with a bibliography extending from a draft bill of 1887 to one of 1969. The Guide's section on "Education" records the setting up in 1904 of the RIBA Board of Architectural Education, and the system by which any school which applied for recognition, whose syllabus was approved by the Board and whose examinations were conducted by an approved external examiner, and whose standard of attainment was guaranteed by periodical inspections by a "Visiting Board" from the BAE, could be placed on the list of "recognized schools" and its successful students could qualify for exemption from RIBA examinations.

The content of the acts, particularly section 1 (1) of the amending act of 1938, shows the importance which was then attached to giving architects the responsibility of superintending or supervising the building works of local authorities (for housing and other projects), rather than persons professionally qualified only as municipal or other engineers. By the 1970s another issue had emerged affecting education for qualification and registration for practice as an architect, due to the obligation imposed on the United Kingdom and other European governments to comply with European Union Directives concerning mutual recognition of professional qualifications in favour of equal standards across borders, in furtherance of the policy for a single market of the European Union. This led to proposals for reconstituting ARCUK. Eventually, in the 1990s, before proceeding, the government issued a consultation paper "Reform of Architects Registration" (1994). The change of name to "Architects Registration Board" was one of the proposals which was later enacted in the Housing Grants, Construction and Regeneration Act 1996 and re-enacted as the Architects Act 1997; another was the abolition of the ARCUK Board of Architectural Education.

RIBA Visiting Boards continue to assess courses for exemption from the RIBA's examinations in architecture. Under arrangements made in 2011 the validation criteria are jointly held by the RIBA and the Architects Registration Board, but unlike the ARB, the RIBA also validates courses outside the UK.

In 2005 the RIBA set up Academy of Urbanism.

In 2019 the RIBA Council voted for the creation of the RIBA Future Architects initiative, an online platform and international network aimed at Part I, Part II and Part III architectural students and graduates. The initiative was championed by student and associates' representatives on Council, after a 2018 campaign highlighting the hardship architectural students faced in their degrees. The initiative is designed to support, inspire and provide a voice as students and graduates transition from study to practice.

=== Design policy ===
The RIBA sees itself as a lobbying organisation acting for architects, "for better buildings, stronger communities, and higher environmental standards". For example, in 2005 in response to concerns that the UK government's Private Finance Initiative did not offer good value for money, RIBA put forward a model known as "Smart PFI", under which a traditionally appointed design team would prepare "example plans" which would be finalised and costed by PFI bidders.

== Structure ==
The RIBA is governed by the RIBA Council, a group of 60 members, elected from among the RIBA membership, the majority of whom are chartered architects.

The RIBA is a member organisation, with 44,000 members. Chartered Members are entitled to call themselves chartered architects and to append the post-nominals RIBA after their name; Student Members are not permitted to do so. Formerly, fellowships of the institute were granted, although no longer; those who continue to hold this title instead add FRIBA. Members gain access to all the institute's services and receive its monthly magazine the RIBA Journal and articles on its website, RIBAJ.com.

=== Designation ===
- ARIBA: Associate of the Royal Institute of British Architects (no longer granted to new members)
- FRIBA: Fellow of the Royal Institute of British Architects (and Hon Fellow – an honorary designation)
- RIBA: Chartered member of the Royal Institute of British Architects
- The institute's president is designated PRIBA, past presidents use PPRIBA

=== Regions ===
The institute also maintains twelve regional groups around the United Kingdom, including two regional offices. The first regional office was the East of England, opened at Cambridge in 1966. Each region encompasses several local architectural groups. In February 2022, the RIBA was criticised for cost-cutting proposals to merge its offices across England into three 'super regions'.

- RIBA East
- RIBA East Midlands
- RIBA London
- RIBA North East
- RIBA North West
- RIBA South
- RIBA South East
- RIBA South West and Wessex
- RIBA West Midlands
- RIBA Yorkshire
- RIAS – Royal Incorporation of Architects in Scotland, Edinburgh
- RSAW – Royal Society of Architects in Wales, Cardiff
- RSUA – Royal Society of Ulster Architects, Belfast

There are also international branches under the RIBA International umbrella, with offices in London, Shanghai and Sharjah (United Arab Emirates). There are four principal membership groups:

- RIBA Americas – includes the RIBA USA Chapter
- RIBA Asia and Australasia
- RIBA Europe
- RIBA Middle East and Africa

=== RIBA Enterprises ===
RIBA Enterprises was the commercial arm of the RIBA, with a registered office in Newcastle upon Tyne, a base at 76 Portland Place in London, and an office in Newark, later sold to allow further investment. It once employed over 250 staff, approximately 180 of whom were based in Newcastle. Its services include RIBA Insight, and RIBA Product Selector. It previously ran RIBA Publishing, RIBA Bookshops (which operates online and at 66 Portland Place), RIBA Appointments and RIBA Journal. These all now operate as part of the RIBA.

RIBA Enterprises also included the Newcastle-based NBS (National Building Specification), which had 130 staff and dealt with building regulations and the Construction Information Service. In June 2018, the RIBA announced it was selling a £31.8 million stake in RIBA Enterprises, to LDC, the private equity arm of Lloyds Bank. In November 2020, NBS was sold to Byggfakta Group, a Sweden-based information services provider. The RIBA received £172 million from the sale of its stake in NBS, some of which was reinvested to provide a reliable income stream for the institute.

The RIBA has been recognised as a business Superbrand since 2008.

== RIBA office, 66 Portland Place ==
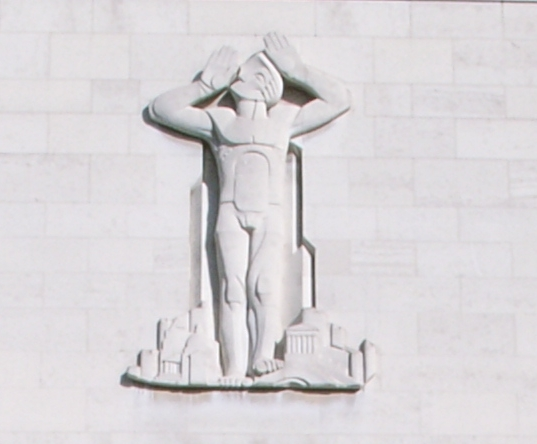
Architectural Aspiration, by Edward Bainbridge, above the main entrance, RIBA, 66 Portland Place, London

RIBA's office has been at 66 Portland Place, London, since 1934 (however, the organisation has temporarily moved out from mid-2025 due to building refurbishment work). This Grade II* listed building was designed by architect George Grey Wornum for the institute and features sculptures by Edward Bainbridge Copnall and James Woodford. The building is open to the public, and includes a library, architectural bookshop, a café, bar, exhibition galleries and lecture theatre. Rooms are hired out for events.

The organisation also owned an adjacent building at 76 Portland Place, a 1950s office building overhauled in 2013, which housed RIBA staff and a members' café. In September 2021, following the COVID-19 pandemic and an £8 million budget deficit in the year ending December 2020, the RIBA announced plans to sell 76 Portland Place and to reduce staff numbers. Chief executive Alan Vallance said 89% of the RIBA's staff only wanted to work two or three days a week from an office, so 76 Portland Place was surplus to requirements. A potential 20 further redundancies were reported on 31 January 2022. The organisation's annual report and accounts for the year ending 31 December 2022 reported a £6.3 million trading deficit (following shortfalls of £8 million in 2021 and £8.2 million in 2020), though the sale of its lease on 76 Portland Place for nearly £12 million had since helped balance its books.

In January 2022, the RIBA announced an architectural competition for RIBA-chartered architectural practices for a £20 million+ "comprehensive refurbishment" of its 66 Portland Place. In 2024, this renovation was budgeted at £85 million. The building will close on 1 June 2025 for two and a half years to enable refurbishment. In March 2025, the RIBA said staff would be temporarily relocated to the Royal College of Physicians' Jerwood Centre during the work, but this decision was withdrawn in May 2025. In August 2025, the RIBA said staff would instead be housed in the central London offices of the British Medical Association in Tavistock Square.

=== British Architectural Library ===
Reading Room, British Architectural Library, RIBA, 66 Portland Place, London

The British Architectural Library, sometimes referred to as the RIBA Library, was established in 1834 upon the founding of the institute with donations from members. Now, with over four million items, it is one of the three largest architectural libraries in the world and the largest in Europe. Some items from the collections are on permanent display at the Victoria and Albert Museum (V&A) in the V&A + RIBA Architecture Gallery and included in temporary exhibitions at the RIBA and across Europe and North America. Its collections include:

- Archives: 1.5 million items made up of architects' personal papers, correspondence, notebooks and diaries.
- Audiovisual materials: Talks held at the RIBA, including talks by winners of the Royal Gold Medal.
- Biographical files: 20,000 biographical files relating to a specific architect or firm. Files contain a mix of nomination papers for membership of the RIBA, obituaries, brochures, articles and letters.
- Books: 150,000 books and 20,000 pamphlets, with the earliest book dating from 1478. Amongst the items is a first edition of Andrea Palladio's I quattro libri dell'architettura from 1570 and John Tallis's Tallis's London street views from 1838 to 1840.
- Drawings: 1 million items are held. These predominantly cover British architects from the Renaissance to the present day, such as Ernő Goldfinger, Charles Holden and Edwin Lutyens. It holds the world's largest collection of drawings by Andrea Palladio.
- Models: Examples come from architects such as Denys Lasdun for his Keeling House and National Theatre, London.
- Periodicals: 2,000 architectural titles collected, with complete sets of Architectural Review, Architects' Journal, and Country Life.
- Photographs: 1.5 million items, including the archive of the Architectural Press. Items date from the 19th century, but with major holdings of 20th-century photographers such as Eric de Maré, John Maltby, John Donat and Henk Snoek.

The overcrowded conditions of the library was one of the reasons why the RIBA moved from 9 Conduit Street (where it had been since 1859) to larger premises at 66 Portland Place in 1934. The library remained open throughout World War II and was able to shelter the archives of Modernist architect Adolf Loos during the war.

The library is based at two public sites: the Reading Room at the RIBA's headquarters, 66 Portland Place, London; and the RIBA Architecture Study Rooms in the Henry Cole Wing of the V&A. The Reading Room, designed by the building's architect George Grey Wornum and his wife Miriam, retains its original 1934 Art Deco interior with open bookshelves, original furniture and double-height central space. The study rooms, opened in 2004, were designed by Wright & Wright Architects. The library is funded entirely by the RIBA but it is open to the public without charge. It operates a free learning programme aimed at students, education groups and families, and an information service for RIBA members and the public through the RIBA Information Centre.

A partnership with the London Archives will see some of the collections and contents of the library transferred temporarily to the London Archives, Clerkenwell, when the library closes in April 2025 for the renovation of 66 Portland Place.

=== V&A + RIBA Architecture Partnership ===
V&A + RIBA Architecture Gallery, Room 128, Victoria and Albert Museum, London

Since 2004, through the V&A + RIBA Architecture Partnership, the RIBA and V&A have worked together to promote the understanding and enjoyment of architecture.

In 2004, the two institutions created the Architecture Gallery (Room 128) at the V&A showing artefacts from the collections of both institutions, this was the first permanent gallery devoted to architecture in the UK. The adjacent Architecture Exhibition Space (Room 128a) is used for temporary displays related to architecture. Both spaces were designed by Gareth Hoskins Architects. At the same time the RIBA Library Drawing and Archives Collections moved from 21 Portman Place to new facilities in the Henry Cole Wing at the V&A. Under the Partnership new study rooms were opened where members of the public could view items from the RIBA and V&A architectural collections under the supervision of curatorial staff. These and the nearby education room were designed by Wright & Wright Architects.

In June 2022, the RIBA announced it would be terminating its partnership with the V&A in 2027, "by mutual agreement", ending the permanent architecture gallery at the museum. Artefacts will be transferred back to the RIBA's existing collections, with some rehoused at the institute's headquarters at 66 Portland Place, set to become a new House of Architecture following a £20 million refurbishment.

In January 2026, the RIBA signed a deal to move the four million items in its historic drawings and archives collection to the National Archives in Kew while plans for a more permanent home were finalised. The RIBA Study Room at the V&A would close in June 2026 while the collection was transferred to Kew, where a new study space will be available from autumn 2027.

== RIBA Awards ==
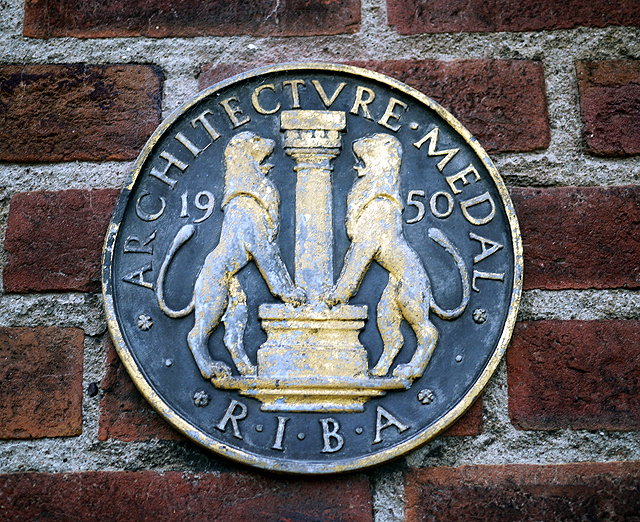
RIBA plaque on Whitla Hall, Queen's University Belfast

The RIBA has been awarding the President's Medals annually since 1836, making them the institute's oldest awards, and possibly the oldest awards worldwide in the field of architecture. The Institute runs many other awards including the Stirling Prize for the best new building of the year; the Royal Gold Medal (first awarded in 1848), which honours a distinguished body of work; the Stephen Lawrence Prize, sponsored by the Marco Goldschmied Foundation, originally for projects with a construction budget of less than £1,000,000, and the President's Awards for Research. The RIBA European Award was inaugurated in 2005 for work in the European Union, outside the UK. The RIBA National Award and the RIBA International Award were established in 2007. Since 1966, the RIBA also judges regional awards which are presented locally in the UK regions (East, East Midlands, London, North East, North West, Northern Ireland, Scotland, South/South East, South West/Wessex, Wales, West Midlands and Yorkshire). Inaugurated in 2001, the Manser Medal was renamed the RIBA House of the Year award in 2014.

== RIBA competitions ==
RIBA Competitions is the Royal Institute of British Architects' unit dedicated to organising architectural and other design-related competitions.

Architectural design competitions are used by an organisation that plans to build a new building or refurbish an existing building. They can be used for buildings, engineering work, structures, landscape design projects or public realm artworks. A competition typically asks for architects and/or designers to submit a design proposal in response to a given Brief. The winning design will then be selected by an independent jury panel of design professionals and client representatives. The independence of the jury is vital to the fair conduct of a competition.

== RIBA Plan of Work ==
The RIBA Plan of Work, first developed in 1963, is a stage-by-stage model considered "the definitive design and process management tool for the UK construction industry". The latest version is the RIBA Plan of Work 2020, which has eight stages, 0 to 7. This version replaced the 2013 version. Previously, the RIBA Outline Plan of Work 2007 used letters for each stage (stages A–L) rather than numbers.

RIBA work plan stages are often referred to in architectural, planning and procurement contexts, for example procurement notices may specify the relevant stages of work for which professional support is required.

== Education ==
In addition to the Architects Registration Board, the RIBA provides accreditation to architecture schools in the UK under a procedure which validates courses at over 50 educational establishments across the UK. It also provides validation to international courses without input from the ARB.

The RIBA has three parts to the education process: Part I which is generally a three-year first degree, a year-out of at least one year work experience in an architectural practice precedes the Part II which is generally a two-year post graduate diploma or masters. A further year out must be taken before the RIBA Part III professional exams can be taken. Overall it takes a minimum of seven years before an architecture student can seek chartered status.

== Criticism ==
=== Lack of representation ===
In common with other professional bodies established in the early 19th century, the RIBA was initially a men-only institution. Thomas Leverton Donaldson, the RIBA's first secretary aimed "To uphold ourselves the character of Architects as men of taste, men of science, men of honour"; this vision of the masculine architect largely excluded women from the architecture profession for decades. More than 60 years after its foundation, the RIBA first admitted women as members in 1898; the first female member was Ethel Charles (1871–1962), followed by her sister Bessie (1869–1932) in 1900. It was then more than 30 years before the RIBA elected its first woman fellow, Gillian Harrison (1898–1974), in 1931, and a further 77 years before the RIBA elected its first female president, Ruth Reed. There is no record of any of the buildings designed by the early women members.

In 1985, when under 5% of chartered architects were women, the Women Architects Forum was established. In 1993 the RIBA established a special interest group, the Women Architects Group; in 1999, renamed Women In Architecture, it became independent of the RIBA, which, in 2000, set up its first equality forum, Architects For Change. This became an umbrella group for Women In Architecture, the Society of Black Architects, student forum Archaos and other groups. In 2017, around 17% of architects were women, up from 8% in 1999. In November 2024, the RIBA commissioned an investigation, to be undertaken by the Fawcett Society, into gender equity in architecture. Women make up 31% of architects, while the average gender pay gap is 16%.

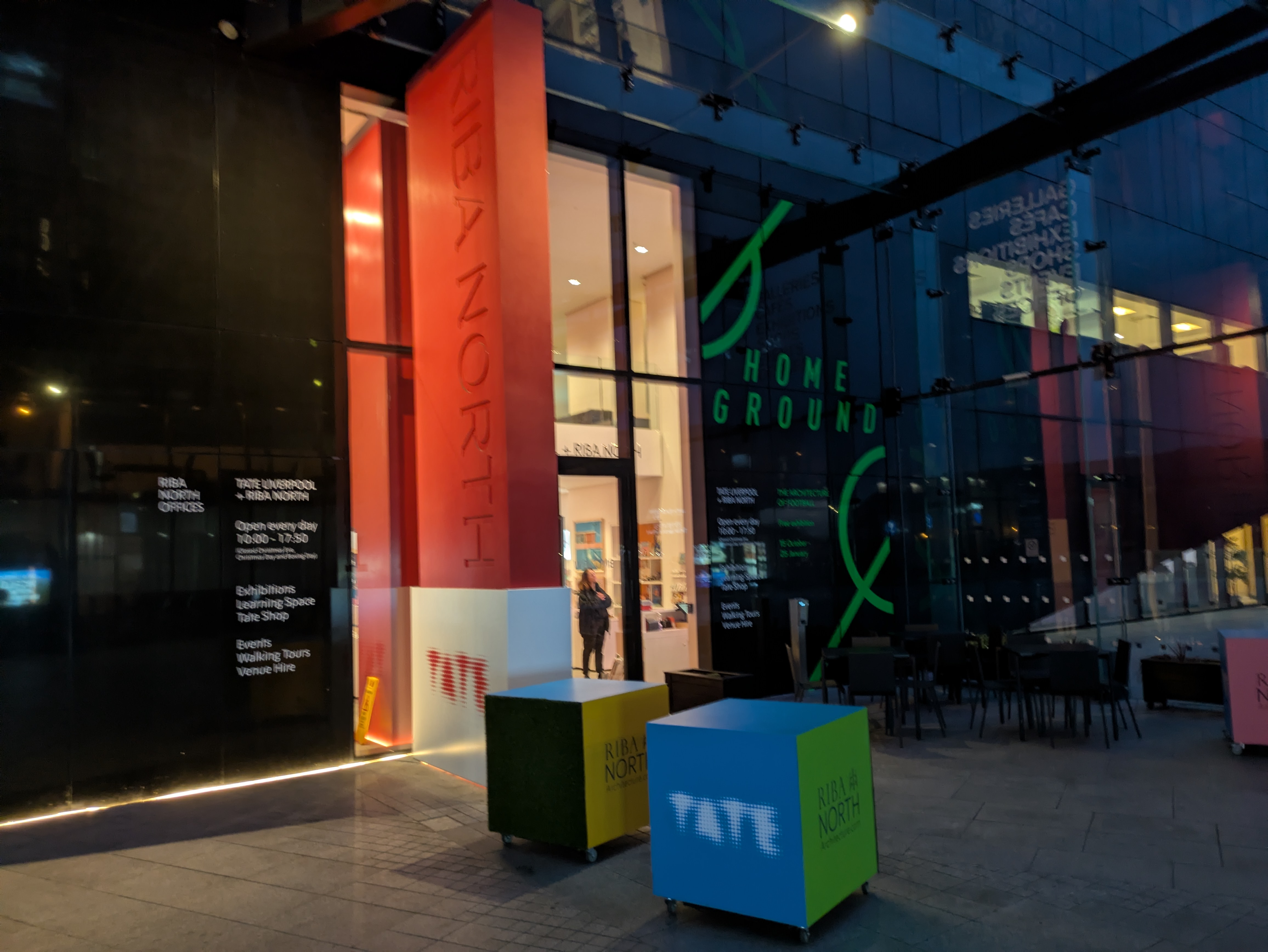
RIBA North, Mann Island, Liverpool opened 2017

The RIBA has been criticised by architects outside southeast England as a London-centric organisation which does not reach out to all members in the United Kingdom and beyond. The organisation has also been accused of institutional racism, of having a "deep, systemic disengagement from the membership", of lacking transparency, and being "increasingly irrelevant" to architects.

In March 2022, young architects began a campaign to get the next RIBA president to move beyond "empty slogans and self-serving initiatives" and shake up an institute seen as "out of touch" with the wider profession. The campaign included members of a grassroots organisation, the Future Architects Front (FAF), and the institute's Future Architects Steering Group; their preferred candidate, Muyiwa Oki, was named on 6 May 2022. Days later, the RIBA announced a restriction on new members participating in the elections (starting on 28 June 2022), a rule change described by the FAF as "an outrageous lack of transparency" and "exclusionary tactics". Nonetheless, in August 2022, Oki was elected to be the next RIBA president from September 2023. In 2024, the Just Transition group, which had also supported Oki, put forward another 'change' candidate, Funmbi Adeagbo, to succeed Oki as president in September 2025.

Also in May 2022, a RIBA director, Dian Small, highlighted the lack of diversity at an RIBA awards event, suggesting black architects "were not invited". On 26 May 2022, the RIBA's first director of diversity and inclusion, Marsha Ramroop, left after 13 months with the organisation. In December 2022, the RIBA decided not to "proceed with the development and sale of an equality, diversity and inclusion (EDI) guidance book for practices, originally planned for 2024". The RIBA had commissioned Ramroop to write the book; she said she was "extremely disappointed that RIBA has taken the decision not to go ahead with publishing it."

=== Governance ===
Questions about the RIBA's transparency were also raised by Alan Jones during his presidency (2019–2021). Between 31 March and 15 June 2020, he temporarily stepped back over a matter in his private life, reported by the RIBA as a "serious incident" to the Charity Commission. After an independent investigation, Jones resumed his role as president on 15 June 2020. In July 2021, he stepped down as a RIBA trustee, feeling unable to support a proposal to renew the contract of the RIBA chief executive, Alan Vallance, having made "serious allegations" about Vallance's conduct in February 2020. Senior figures demanded the body 'come clean' about the conflict saying "The RIBA is becoming an increasingly secretive organisation. ... Confidentiality has been weaponised and woe betide anyone who wants to ask difficult questions...." A Council Board Advisory Group was established, with a QC investigating complaints. Jones told Architects' Journal that he had come under pressure from senior RIBA figures to resign, and felt that "in terms of [RIBA's] transparency and accountability, there is room for improvement."

A RIBA council member, Kerr Robertson, was removed as a councillor in October 2022. Described by Architects' Journal as a whistleblower, Robertson had criticised RIBA's board about issues including alleged conflicts of interest, institutional bullying, trustee interference in RIBA election rules changes, and a data breach. In June 2025, after reaching a confidential settlement with Jones, the RIBA issued a statement saying "The RIBA regrets the fact that unauthorised leaks occurred and the harm that this caused Professor Jones and his family". In September 2026, the RIBA confirmed it had paid £150,000 to settle the dispute with Jones.

== Presidents ==
Presidents of the RIBA are elected by RIBA members, serve a two-year term and chair the RIBA Council. The post was created in 1835, shortly after the institute's founding. In 2009, 174 years later, Ruth Reed became the institute's first female president.

The current RIBA president, serving from September 2023 to August 2025, is Muyiwa Oki, who was elected in August 2022 and took office on 1 September 2023.

- 1835–1859 Thomas de Grey, 2nd Earl de Grey
- 1860–1861 Charles Robert Cockerell
- 1861–1863 William Tite
- 1863–1865 Thomas Leverton Donaldson
- 1865–1867 Alexander James Beresford-Hope
- 1867–1870 William Tite (Note: second term)
- 1870–1873 Thomas Henry Wyatt
- 1873–1876 George Gilbert Scott
- 1876–1879 Charles Barry, Jr.
- 1879–1881 John Whichcord Jr.
- 1881–1881 George Edmund Street (Note: died in office)
- 1882–1884 Horace Jones
- 1884–1886 Ewan Christian
- 1886–1887 Edward I'Anson
- 1888–1890 Alfred Waterhouse
- 1891–1894 John Macvicar Anderson
- 1894–1896 Francis Penrose
- 1896–1899 George Aitchison
- 1899–1902 William Emerson
- 1902–1904 Aston Webb
- 1904–1906 John Belcher
- 1906–1908 Thomas Edward Collcutt
- 1908–1910 Ernest George
- 1910–1912 Leonard Stokes
- 1912–1914 Reginald Blomfield
- 1914–1917 Ernest Newton
- 1917–1919 Henry Thomas Hare
- 1919–1921 John William Simpson
- 1922–1923 Paul Waterhouse
- 1923–1925 John Alfred Gotch
- 1925–1927 Edward Guy Dawber
- 1927–1929 Walter Tapper
- 1929–1931 Banister Flight Fletcher
- 1931–1933 Raymond Unwin
- 1933–1935 Giles Gilbert Scott
- 1935–1937 Percy Thomas
- 1937–1939 Harry Stuart Goodhart-Rendel
- 1939–1940 Edwin Stanley Hall
- 1940–1943 William Henry Ansell
- 1943–1946 Sir Percy Thomas
- 1946–1948 Lancelot Keay
- 1948–1950 Michael Waterhouse
- 1950–1952 Andrew Graham Henderson
- 1952–1954 Howard Robertson
- 1954–1956 Charles Herbert Aslin
- 1956–1958 Kenneth Cross
- 1958–1960 Basil Spence
- 1960–1962 William Holford
- 1962–1964 Robert Hogg Matthew
- 1964–1965 Donald Evelyn Edward Gibson
- 1965–1967 Lionel Gordon Baliol Brett
- 1967–1969 Hugh Wilson
- 1969–1971 Peter Faulkner Shepheard
- 1971–1973 Alex Gordon
- 1973–1975 Fred Pooley
- 1975–1977 Eric Lyons
- 1977–1979 Gordon Graham
- 1979–1981 John Brian Jefferson
- 1981–1983 Owen Luder
- 1983–1985 Michael Manser
- 1985–1987 Larry Rolland
- 1987–1989 Rod Hackney
- 1989–1991 Maxwell Hutchinson
- 1991–1993 Richard MacCormac
- 1993–1995 Frank Duffy
- 1995–1997 Owen Luder
- 1997–1999 David Rock
- 1999–2001 Marco Goldschmied
- 2001–2003 Paul Hyett
- 2003–2005 George Ferguson
- 2005–2007 Jack Pringle
- 2007–2009 Sunand Prasad
- 2009–2011 Ruth Reed
- 2011–2013 Angela Brady
- 2013–2015 Stephen Hodder
- 2015–2017 Jane Duncan
- 2017–2019 Ben Derbyshire
- 2019–2021 Alan Jones
- 2021–2023 Simon Allford
- 2023–2025 Muyiwa Oki
- 2025–2027 Chris Williamson

== Secretaries ==
The role of secretary of the RIBA was established in 1871. Between 1835 and 1870, the secretarial duties of the institute fell to honorary secretaries. Recent and current holders of the role are now referred to as chief executive.

- 1871–1878 Charles Eastlake
- 1878–1896 William H. White
- 1897–1907 William John Locke
- 1908–1943 Sir Ian MacAlister
- 1945–1959 Cyril Douglas Spragg
- 1959–1968 Gordon Randolph Ricketts
- 1968–1987 Patrick Harrison
- 1987–1994 Bill Rodgers
- 1994–2000 Alexander Reid
- 2000–2009 Richard Hastilow
- 2009–2016 Harry Rich
- 2016–2022 Alan Vallance
- 2023–present Valerie Vaughan-Dick

== Special Interest Groups ==
=== Traditional Architecture Group ===
The Traditional Architecture Group (TAG) is an officially recognized linked group within the Royal Institute of British Architects. Founded in 2003, TAG was created to support and promote architects, urban designers, and craftspeople practicing traditional, vernacular, and classical architecture in the United Kingdom.

The group seeks to provide a forum for traditional design within the professional framework of the RIBA, advocating for human-scaled urbanism, local building traditions, and the integration of traditional building crafts into contemporary design. TAG also acts as the host organization for the United Kingdom national chapter of the International Network for Traditional Building, Architecture & Urbanism|International Network for Traditional Building, Architecture & Urbanism, INTBAU.

== See also ==
- Architects' Registration Board
- Royal Town Planning Institute
- Chartered Institute of Architectural Technologists
- Chartered Institute of Building
- Construction Industry Council
- Joint Contracts Tribunal
- RIBA Knowledge Communities
- National Amenity Societies
