= Royal Society of Ulster Architects =

Professional body for registered architects in Northern Ireland

The Royal Society of Ulster Architects (RSUA) is the professional body for registered architects in Northern Ireland. It was founded in 1901. Chartered Royal Institute of British Architects (RIBA) members in Northern Ireland are automatically members of the RSUA. RSUA members use the suffix "RSUA" and may also use "RIBA". According to its website it has "over 1000 members".

== Organisation and activities ==
The supreme governing body of the society is its council, which chaired by the president of the RSUA. The society members are entitled to nominate fellow members to the council and to vote in elections. As of 2026, the RSUA president was James Grieve and Ciarán Fox was the RSUA's director.

A majority of council memebers are independently elected architects with some representing interests in Northern Ireland such as student and staff representatives for both Queen's University Belfast and Ulster University.

The society's bookshop, at 2 Mount Charles in Belfast, is the Northern Ireland regional branch of the RIBA bookshop.

It is involved in architectural education and awards scholarships to Northern Ireland-based students of architecture. The society also awards the annual RSUA Silver Medal and RSUA Bronze Medal, which are similar to the RIBA President's Medals Students Awards.

One of the RSUA's key events is their Building Inspiration Lecture, sponsored by Arup, previously given by Níall McLaughlin Architects (2006), Urban Splash (2024), Daniel Libeskind (2019) and Snohetta (2016).

== PLACE ==
PLACE Architecture & Built Environment Centre was a part of the RSUA from 2004 until 2019. It was formed in 2004 by the society in partnership with Belfast City Council and the Arts Council of Northern Ireland. It closed in August 2019.

== Perspective magazine ==
The society issues a journal, Perspective, on a bi-monthly basis. In effect this publication is not so much a journal as it is a magazine; It features reviews of recently completed buildings in Northern Ireland, together with book reviews and local arts updates. The magazine is based in Belfast. Its content is controlled by an editorial committee dominated by members of the RSUA Council, the central governing body of the society. It has been published by the Ulster Tatler Group since 2001.

== RSUA Design Awards ==
The RSUA Design Awards, which are architectural, artistic and cultural awards, are given annually to recognise the work of architects in Northern Ireland. Among these awards is the Liam MacCormick Prize, awarded to the building judged to be best overall in the relevant year. The RSUA awards are adjudicated by a panel of independent judges.
