= The City Paper =

Newspaper in Nashville, Tennessee, United States

- Type: Weekly newspaper (Friday)
- Format: Tabloid
- Owner: SouthComm Communications
- Founded: November 1, 2000
- Ceased publication: August 9, 2013
- Language: English
- Headquarters: 210 12th Avenue South, Suite 100, Nashville, TN 37203
- Circulation: 78,000
- OCLC number: 45859314
- Website: nashvillecitypaper.com

The City Paper (also known as The Nashville City Paper) was a free, weekly newspaper that served Nashville, Tennessee from November 1, 2000 to August 9, 2013.

== History ==
The City Paper began publication as a daily, Monday through Friday newspaper on November 1, 2000, providing competition to The Tennessean, which was the only daily in town after the Nashville Banner closed in 1998. The City Paper started with a daily circulation of about 40,000 copies and was delivered free of charge to homes in the Nashville Metropolitan area. Within a month, home delivery was cut back to paid subscribers and circulation was cut to 20,000. Initially, The City Paper projected a circulation of 90,000.

On March 2, 2004, City Paper founder Brian Brown announced he was replacing himself as publisher with Tom Larimer, previously of the Daily News Journal in Murfreesboro. A few months later, Larimer resigned and Jim Ezzell was named interim publisher on July 16, 2004. Ezzell, who served on The City Paper’s operating committee for three years, is the chief financial officer of Thompson Machinery Commerce Corp., whose owners would later buy the newspaper.

On June 2, 2006, The City Paper announced that it had hired Albie Del Favero, publisher of the Nashville Scene, as its publisher. For three years, Clint Brewer, former managing editor of the Lebanon Democrat and a past national president of the U.S. Society of Professional Journalists, served as executive editor.

In June 2007, it was estimated that The City Paper reached an average of more than 250,000 unique readers each week, according to a media audit reported in the Nashville Scene. By comparison, the same article reported the A-section of The Tennessean had at that time reached 365,700 readers weekly.

It was announced April 9, 2008, that Nashville-based SouthComm Communications purchased The City Paper. SouthComm—which also owns the Nashville Post, Business Tennessee magazine, and other Nashville-based media products—is owned by the Thompson family of Thompson Machinery Commerce Corp. Members of the Thompson family also retained a significant minority stake in the paper until its closure.

On April 28, 2008, shortly after its acquisition by SouthComm, The City Paper ceased daily publication and began publishing and distributing print editions two days each week (Monday and Thursday) though it continued daily updates to its website. In late 2009, The City Paper further scaled back its publication from twice weekly to once a week on Mondays. The Thursday edition, which covered mainly entertainment and lifestyle news, was merged with the Nashville Scene.

Stephen George, previous editor of LEO Weekly, another SouthComm-owned publication, took over as editor of The City Paper in January 2010.

In 2011, Steve Cavendish replaced Stephen George as editor when George left to work as U.S. Rep Jim Cooper's press secretary and then later for U.S. Rep John Yarmuth in the same capacity. Cavendish remained at the helm until, citing falling advertising revenues and calling it "a very expensive experiment," SouthComm executives ceased its publication on August 9, 2013.

The City Paper published its final issue on August 9, 2013. The paper's final cover story was an editorial, a rarity since The City Paper had eliminated its Op/Ed page years before, titled "Why Nashville needs newspapers."
