= Giuseppe Ciribini =

Italian engineer and professor

- Born: 20 January 1913; Milan, Italy
- Died: 24 July 1990 (aged 77); Turin, Italy
- Known for: Scholarship and publications
- Scientific career
- Fields: Architectural technology
- Workplaces: Polytechnic University of Turin, Polytechnic University of Milan
- Doctoral advisor: Giovanni Sacchi
- Doctoral students: Giorgio Ceragioli, Renzo Piano

Giuseppe Ciribini (20 January 1913 – 24 July 1990) was an Italian engineer and professor, considered the father of the discipline of architectural technology in Italy.

== Biography ==
Giuseppe Ciribini was born in Milan on 20 January 1913. He studied engineering at the Polytechnic University of Milan where he graduated in 1936 with a dissertation about Italian rural housing, supervised by Prof. Giuseppe Sacchi. During World War II Ciribini served in the Corps of Engineers of the Regia Aeronautica (Italian Royal Air Force).

In 1948, after the war, Ciribini became professor of Elementi costruttivi (literally: building elements) in Milan. Later he moved to the Polytechnic University of Turin where, from 1966 on, he taught architectural technology. Besides Turin e Milan he also gave lectures in several others universities as in Venice, Ulm, São Paulo, Porto Alegre and Algiers.

In addition to his academic activity, Ciribini conducted significant professional activity as a researcher and manager of several public institutions and committees. Among the most relevant of these was the direction of some projects held by the Consiglio Nazionale delle Ricerche, his cooperation with the Ente nazionale italiano di unificazione (the Italian representative organisation in ISO) and with the CEN). From 1955 to 1961 he directed the Comitato Italiano per la produttività edilizia (Italian committee for productivity in the construction industry), sponsored by the European Coal and Steel Community.

In politics he was a member of Democrazia Cristiana and, from 1960 to 1965, he sat as a representative of this party in the city council of Milan.

On 11 September 1989, Ciribini was appointed professor emeritus. He died in Turin on 24 July 1990.

A well-known student of Ciribini is Renzo Piano, whose dissertation Modulazione e coordinamento modulare (Modulation and modular coordination) was supervised by Ciribini in 1966. From the academic activity of Ciribini in Turin grew two different trains of thought: one was guided by Lorenzo Matteoli and widely assumed a performance concept approach, while the second, led by Giorgio Ceragioli, applied architectural technology to border-line building contexts as third world slums and self-building.

== Bibliography ==
- La casa rustica nelle valli del Rosa, Volume 1, Giuseppe Ciribini, Centro nazionale universitario di studi alpini, 1943
- Organizzazione tecnica: impianto e meccanismi dei cantieri per l'edilizia, Giuseppe Ciribini, Marzorati, 1952
- Tensostrutture, Giuseppe Ciribini, UISAA, 1960
- Metodi e strumenti logici per la progettazione architettonica, Giuseppe Ciribini, Polytechnic University of Turin, Faculty of Architecture, Istituto di elementi costruttivi, 1973, Turin.
- Introduzione alla tecnologia del design: metodi e strumenti logici per la progettazione dell'ambiente costruito, Giuseppe Ciribini, Franco Angeli, 1979 - ISBN 88-204-1528-3
- Tecnologia della costruzione, Giuseppe Ciribini, La Nuova Italia Scientifica, Roma, 1992
- Tecnologia e progetto: argomenti di cultura tecnologica della progettazione, Giuseppe Ciribini, Celid, 1995 - ISBN 88-7661-080-4

== Awards and decorations ==
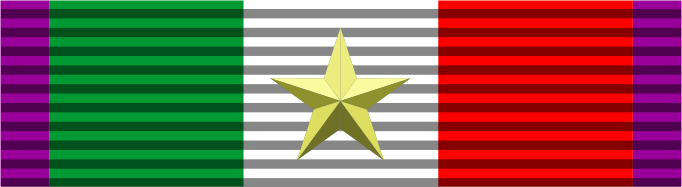
Commander of the Order of Merit of the Italian Republic – awarded 1964
Gold Medal of the Italian Order of Merit for Culture and Art – awarded on 2 June 1984

== See also ==
- Architectural technology
