= Custom Builder =

Trade publication with headquarters in Chicago, Illinois, United States

- Type: business magazine
- Format: Online magazine
- Owner: Endeavor Business Media
- Founded: 1991
- Language: English
- Headquarters: Nashville
- ISSN: 0895-2493

Custom Builder is a trade publication owned by Endeavor Business Media.

== History and profile ==
Established in 1991, the magazine was started with the name Luxury Home Builder and was originally published bimonthly. The magazine was part of Reed Business Information. From January 2006, a seventh issue in April was added to their editorial calendar. Its sister magazine is Professional Builder.

In 2010 Reed Business Information closed the magazine. It was relaunched by MB Media LLC headed Tony Mancini and Rick Blesi the same year.
