= Self-construction (disambiguation) =

One's self-construction is one's cognitive and affective representation of one's own identity.

Self-construction may also refer to:

- Self-construction, the practice of creating one's own individual house
- Self-construction (cosmology), a concept in theoretical physics
- Self-construction (systems theory), the process by which a disordered system of components forms an organized structure by interactions among the components themselves

== See also ==
- Autopoiesis, the self-maintaining chemistry of living cells
- Self-replication
