= Giorgio Ceragioli =

Italian engineer and academic (1930–2008)

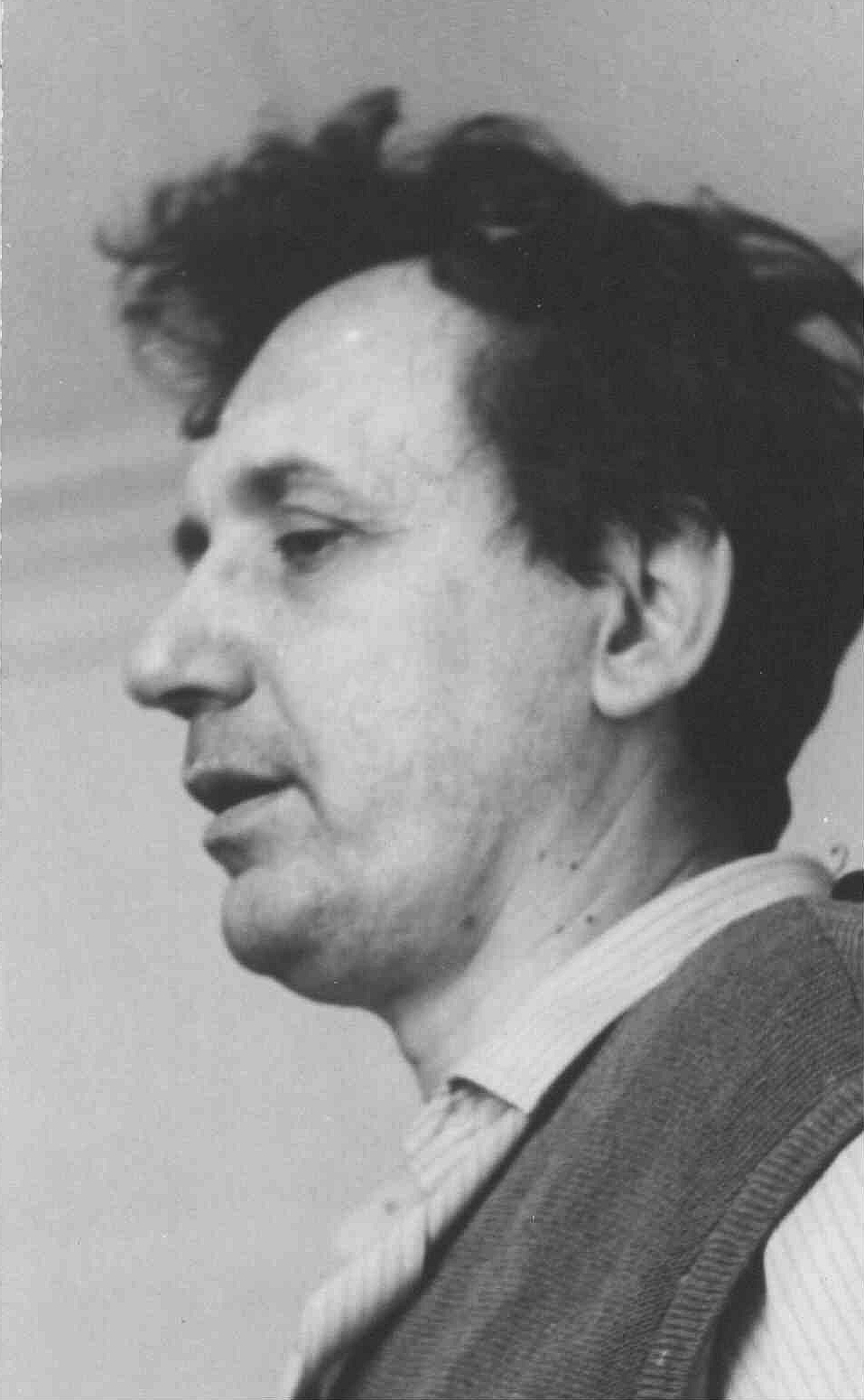
- Born: June 24, 1930; Turin, Italy
- Died: July 17, 2008 (aged 78); Turin, Italy
- Known for: Scholarship and publications
- Scientific career
- Fields: Appropriate technology, international development, Third World, self-building
- Workplaces: Polytechnic University of Turin, Assefa
- Doctoral advisor: Prof. Giuseppe Ciribini

Giorgio Ceragioli (June 24, 1930 – July 17, 2008) was an Italian engineer, professor and a leader in the pro-Third World movement in Italy.

== Biography ==
Giorgio Ceragioli was born in Turin the 24 June 1930. His grandfather was a well known Italian artist also named Giorgio and his father Mario worked as engineer for Turin's municipality. He studied civil engineering at the local university where, after a period of independent professional work as engineer, he became professor of Technology of Architecture. In his youth he volunteered for the local branch of the Society of Saint Vincent de Paul. Later he became a leader of the Azione Cattolica where he supported his pro-Third-world vision establishing the Centro Cattolico Torinese contro la fame nel mondo and organising the first Quaresima di Fraternità. This meant that all money collected by the Catholic Church during the Lent, instead of being used locally, was devoted to projects in the developing countries. His activity led him to travel a lot; he visited India several times getting in touch with the Sarvodaya movement established by Vinoba Bhave. Back in Italy he launched with Giovanni Ermiglia Assefa (Association for Sarva Seva Farms), a still widespread NGO which economically supports Sarvodaya activities in India and also aims to promote Gandhi's principles across Italy.

During the years Assefa provided thousands of lower class Indian farmers with the means necessary to start the cultivation of the land voluntarily given by landowners to Bhoodan movement (or Land Gift Movement). This kind of action has been particularly strong in the state of Tamil Nadu and Andhra Pradesh; Assefa also supports primary education and women's self-organisation. In December 1968 he also established Movimento Sviluppo e Pace, a humanitarian non-religious NGO implementing projects for sustainable development in poor countries

As a university professor his main fields of interest were self-build and appropriate technology, to which he devoted the main part of his educational and scientific activity. In 1988 he established the Scuola di specializzazione in Tecnologia, architettura e città nei PVS, an international post-graduate school of the Polytechnic University of Turin dealing with habitat problems of developing countries. He was director of the school until 1996, when he had to retire due to Parkinson's disease. In 2003 the school was turned into the Centro di ricerca e di documentazione in Tecnologia, architettura e città nei Paesi in via di sviluppo.

After his death was established for his memory the Comitato Giorgio Ceragioli, a committee which managed a fellowship endowment devoted to support dissertations or research projects about habitat in developing countries. Also the Università del dialogo (literally University of dialog), an interdisciplinary school held by SERMIG of Torino, is dedicated to Giorgio Ceragioli (together with the Vietnamese catholic cardinal Nguyễn Văn Thuận).

== Selected bibliography ==
- (in Italian) L'edilizia popolare nel Sud-est asiatico : analisi di problemi e orientamenti, Torino grafica, 1965, Turin.
- (in French) Habitations pour tous dans les pays en voie de développement (with N. Comoglio Maritano), Cicsene, 1973, Turin.
- Low cost housing in developing countries : technological proposals and regulations, with N. Comoglio Maritano and G. Cattai, Cicsene, 1978, Turin.
- (in Italian) Industrializzazione edilizia : elementi per un glossario problematico (with G.Canavesio), Levrotto e Bella, 1980, Turin.
- (in Italian) Problemi normativi e autocostruzione (with N. Comoglio Maritano and G. Capetti), C.L.U.T., 1985, Turin.
- Technological hybridization, with N. Comoglio Maritano, Cepam, 1987, São Paulo.
- (in Italian) Glossario progettuale di tecnologie edilizie per PVS (with G. Cattai and N. Comoglio Maritano), CICSENE-LVIA, 1988, Turin.
- (in Italian) La valutazione interdisciplinare dell'edilizia nei PVS: problemi temutivi e difficolta (with other authors), C.L.U.T., 1988, Turin.
- (in Italian) Pensieri leggendo « Vinoba on Gandhi » sulla difesa popolare nonviolenta, in Verso una difesa popolare nonviolenta per l'Italia?, CEDAM, 1988, Padua.
- (in Italian) Tecnologia dell'architettura (with N.Comoglio Maritano), C.L.U.T., 1989, Turin.
- (in Italian) Per una identificazione e definizione del progetto Habitat (with G. Cattai and N. Comoglio Maritano), CICSENE–ICEPS, 1990, Turin – Rome.
- Adaptable Technologies, typologies and evaluations for low-cost housing in the Megalopolis of developing countries (with N. Comoglio Maritano), MG, 1995, Belo Horizonte.
- (in Italian) Sviluppo e società a confini aperti. Scritti di Giorgio Ceragioli, L'Harmattan Italia, 1998 (editor: Massimo Foti).
- (in Italian) Dare un'anima al futuro. Note per un umanesimo tecnologico, Edizioni MILLE, 2002, Turin.
- (in Italian) I Giobbetti - una saga familiare, Priuli e Verlucca, 2011, Scarmagno (editor: Massimo Foti).
- (in Italian) Creativi e responsabili, Edizioni MILLE, 2016, Turin (editor: Massimo Foti).
