= E. Thomas Wood =

American journalist

E. Thomas Wood (born October 9, 1963) is an American journalist, historian and freelance writer. From 2005 until 2011, he worked as a reporter for NashvillePost.com, a local business and political news website in Nashville, Tennessee, and related publications.

In the 1990s, Wood regularly contributed to The New York Times from Nashville and other locations (including Romania, where he lectured at universities in 1997), and to The Wall Street Journal. He was the founding editor of Bank Director magazine and served as editor and publisher of Nashville Life and Business Nashville magazines. He was a business reporter and interim business editor at The Tennessean in the early 1990s. Since 2012, he has worked as a staff marketing writer for the global law firm Pillsbury Winthrop Shaw Pittman LLP.

He has been a member since 1998 of the state-chartered Tennessee Holocaust Commission and since 2018 of the Metropolitan Nashville Historical Commission.

A native of Nashville, Wood is a graduate of that city's Montgomery Bell Academy (having attended Riverside Military Academy in seventh grade, 1976–77) and Vanderbilt University. He holds a Master's degree in European Studies from Pembroke College, Cambridge.

== Works ==
- Karski: How One Man Tried to Stop the Holocaust, New York: John Wiley and Sons, 1994. ISBN 0-471-14573-4.
- Nashville: An American Self-Portrait (co-editor), Nashville: Beaten Biscuit Press, 2001. ISBN 0-9706702-1-4.
- Profiles in Tenacity: A Century of Stories from Nashville School of Law, Beckon Books, 2010. ISBN 978-1-935442-05-9.
- 'The Suspect: A Memoir (introduction; consultant on companion documentary Indelible: The Case Against Jeffrey Womack), Nashville: Eveready Press, 2012. ISBN 0-9858365-04.
- H.G. Hill Company: A Family Tradition in Three Centuries, Nashville: Grandin Hood Publishers, 2020. ISBN 978-1-73393-0444.
