= Giovanni Ermiglia =

Italian activist

- Born: 24 June 1905; Sanremo, Italy
- Died: 14 January 2004 (aged 98); Sanremo, Italy
- Occupations: teacher and nonviolent activist.

Giovanni Ermiglia (24 June 1905 – 14 January 2004) was a nonviolent Italian activist who founded non-profit organization O.N.G. ASSEFA.

== Biography ==
=== Education and early career ===
Giovanni Ermiglia obtained his high-school diploma from the Liceo Classico Cassini in Sanremo, in the Ligurian region of Italy. He received a degree in jurisprudence from the University of Genova and also received a philosophy qualification from the university of Turin.

While in Piedmont, he spent time with local intellectuals and started dating Lalla Romano, a well known poet, who wrote several poems for him. These works were later collated in Poesie per Giovanni, a book published in 2007 which also included some previously unpublished texts.

Back in Liguria, Ermiglia left aside his forensic work to become a philosophy teacher. In the late 1960s, he took part in the debate on the role of monasticism in Western society. This followed the publication of Thomas Merton's essay The contemplative and the atheist where Ermiglia, from an atheist point of view, supported the idea that monks were not compromised with the most questionable aspects of Catholic church temporal power.

=== Charity Work in India and Italy ===
In 1969, during a trip in the Indian state of Tamil Nadu, Ermiglia met Shri J. Loganathan and other activists of the Bhoodan Movement, which was a movement founded during the 1950s by Vinoba Bhave. The Bhoodan Movement aimed to better distribute land ownership through voluntary land donations. Vinoba walked across India for 14 years collecting 4,193,579 acres of land (around 1,700,000 hectares). Unfortunately, much of this land was dry and/or had been long abandoned, and its new users were very poor and unable to afford new crops, limiting the success of his mission.

After his expedition in India, Ermiglia had the idea to collect money in Italy to help some of the peasant families manage their land effectively and efficiently. The action obtained a large and positive audience around Italy leading to the founding of various groups of activists to support the Indian Sarva Seva Farms (which quite literally means "farms at the service of everybody"), with local groups implementing the Bhoodan Movement in a grassroot way. In these first years of activity, Ermiglia was also supported by Movimento Sviluppo e Pace and SERMIG, two NGOs in North West Italy respectively, and led by Giorgio Ceragioli and Ernesto Olivero.

Ermiglia's commitment to Sarva Seva Farms increased and he spent a lot of time in India up to the 1990s. In 1995, the Italian groups of Bhoodan supporters were unified in ASSEFA Italia, a national NGO which was officially recognised by the Ministry of Foreign Affairs in 2002. As well as ASSEFA, Ermiglia sometimes also represented Movimento Sviluppo e Pace in India.

=== Later life and death ===
In his later years, a persistent illness lessened the rate of Ermiglia's activities, which were then left to several friends and collaborators. The work of ASSEFA, which at first was limited to farming Tamil Nadu and South-India, slowly spread through the country and expanded, encompassing other activities such as education, microgranting and improving the situation of women. In 2015, the NGO was providing services to around one million households living in 10,000 villages.

Giovanni Ermiglia died in 2004 in his hometown of Sanremo. In his will he left his estate to the Livia Rubino e Giovanni Ermiglia foundation, established in order to continue his legacy.

== Awards ==
- Premio Artigiano della pace (Artisan of Peace award, granted by the SERMIG) – 1984.
- Defender of Peace award – Madurai – 1986.
- Cittadino Benemerito di Sanremo (Distinguished citizen of Sanremo, granted by the comune of Sanremo) – 1997.
- UNICEF Italia plaque at Premio internazionale Genova per lo sviluppo dei popoli (International award for people's development) – 1988.
- Peace Builders award (granted by the Indian Government) – 2001.
