= Atlanta (magazine) =

American monthly general-interest magazine

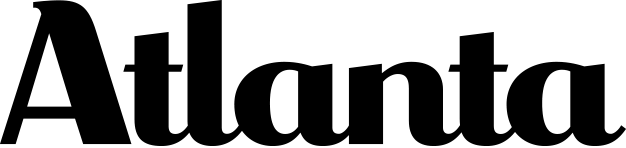

- November 2017 cover of Atlanta
- Editor-in-chief: Betsy Riley
- Categories: Regional
- Frequency: Monthly
- Publisher: Sean McGinnis
- Total circulation: 68,280 (December 2013)
- First issue: May 1961
- Company: Hour Media Group, LLC
- Country: United States
- Based in: Atlanta, Georgia
- Language: English
- Website: atlantamagazine.com
- ISSN: 0004-6701
- OCLC: 50679936

Atlanta is a monthly general-interest magazine based in Atlanta, Georgia, and owned by Hour Media Group, LLC. Its staff has featured notable writers such as Hollis Gillespie, Anne Rivers Siddons, and William Diehl, and it has included contributions from Pat Conroy, Rebecca Burns, Terry Kay, and Melissa Fay Greene. It is a member of the City and Regional Magazine Association (CRMA). Atlanta also publishes the travel magazine Southbound.

== History ==
The Atlanta Chamber of Commerce founded the magazine "City Builder" in 1916 which ran until 1960. It was succeeded by Atlanta, founded in 1961 under the editorship of Jim Townsend. It was sold in 1970, and changed hands several times over the next two decades. Metrocorp bought the magazine in 1987, and in 1989 sold it to American Express for an estimated $8 million. Emmis Publishing, a subsidiary of Emmis Communications, bought the magazine from American Express in August 1993. Atlanta won the National Magazine Awards' feature writing award in 2008.

Since 2005, the magazine has also been hosting an annual Awards segment commemorating the success of Atlanta. The "Best of Atlanta" award shines a light on the best Cityscape, Restaurant, Poet, Oral Pleasures amongst other categories from Atlanta. On March 1, 2017, Emmis Publishing announced that it has sold four of its magazines, including Atlanta, to Hour Media Group, LLC for $6.5 million.
