= Lalla Romano =

Italian writer (1906–2001)

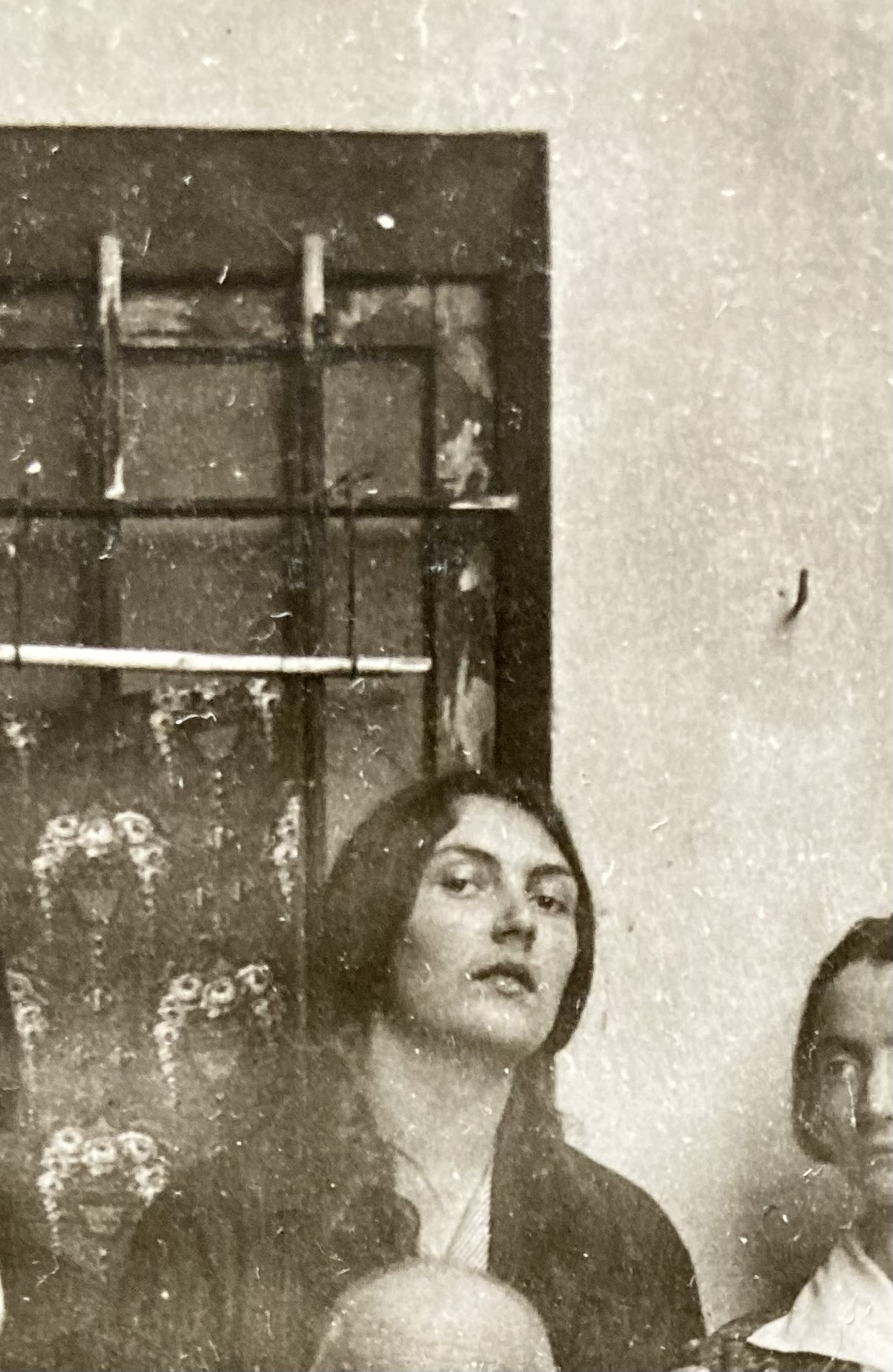
- Born: Graziella Romano; 11 November 1906; Demonte
- Died: 26 June 2001 (aged 94); Milan
- Writing career
- Language: Italian
- Genres: novelist, poet, and journalist

Graziella "Lalla" Romano (11 November 1906 in Demonte – 26 June 2001 in Milan) was an Italian novelist, poet, artist and journalist.

== Life and work ==
Romano was born as Graziella Romano in Demonte in 1906 to a noteworthy Piedmontese family. Her great-uncle was the mathematician and glottologist Giuseppe Peano. Romano was originally interested in painting. She attended the University of Turin, where she studied with art historian Lionello Venturi before Cesare Pavese piqued her interest in writing. She graduated with a degree in literature and then worked as a librarian and teacher. In those years she started dating Giovanni Ermiglia, a philosophy student from Sanremo, and wrote several poems dedicated to him, which were later collected together with other previous unpublished texts in Poesie per Giovanni (2007). During World War II she joined with the Resistance. After the war, she became noted for writings that drew on personal and family experiences.

== Legacy ==
Romano continued to paint throughout her life. In 2009, a retrospective of her paintings was held in Aosta. Her former house in Milan has been converted into a museum to preserve her work.

== Partial bibliography ==
=== Novels ===
- Le metamorfosi, Turin, 1951;
- Maria, Turin, 1953;
- Tetto Murato, Turin, 1957; translated by Brian Robert Moore as A Silence Shared, 2023 (Runner-up for the 2024 John Florio Prize, shortlisted for the 2023 Warwick Prize for Women in Translation, and winner of the PEN Grant for the English Translation of Italian Literature)
- Diario di Grecia, Padua, 1960;
- L'uomo che parlava solo, Turin, 1961;
- La penombra che abbiamo attraversato, Turin, 1964;
- Le parole tra noi leggere, Turin, 1969; (winner of the Strega Prize)
- L'ospite, Turin, 1973;
- Una giovinezza inventata, Turin, 1979;
- Inseparabile, Turin, 1981;
- Nei mari estremi, Turin, 1987; translated by Brian Robert Moore as In Farthest Seas, 2025
- Un sogno del Nord, Turin, 1989.

=== Poetry ===
- Fiore, Turin, 1941;
- L'autunno, Milan, 1955;
- Giovane è il tempo, Turin, 1974.
- Poesie per Giovanni, Ventimiglia, 2007.

== Sources ==
- Alba della Fazia Amoia (1996). "Lalla Romano: A Narrator of Withdrawal". 20th-century Italian Women Writers: The Feminine Experience. SIU Press. pp. 39–. ISBN 978-0-8093-2027-1.
- Katharina M. Wilson (1991). "Lalla Romano". An Encyclopedia of Continental Women Writers. Taylor & Francis. pp. 1061–. ISBN 978-0-8240-8547-6.
