= IndustryWeek =

American trade publication

IndustryWeek Magazine
- Type: Business magazine
- Format: Online magazine
- Owner: Endeavor Business Media
- Editor: Robert Schoenberger
- Founded: 1970
- Language: English
- Headquarters: Cleveland, Ohio, USA
- ISSN: 0039-0895
- Website: www.industryweek.com

IndustryWeek (IW) is an online American trade publication founded in 1882 as Iron Review, changing its name to IW in 1970. It focuses largely on mechanical manufacturing operations, leadership, technology and supply chain coverage.

== Content ==
IndustryWeek is owned by Endeavor Business Media, a business-to-business (B2B) service that produces print, e-media, research, and in-person products. Its editorial offices are in Cleveland, Ohio, and its editor-in-chief is Robert Schoenberger.

IndustryWeek provides manufacturing executives with insights on and analysis of trends, news, operational knowledge, and research, as well as facilitating peer-to-peer conversation among the global manufacturing management community.

== History ==
The magazine was founded as Iron Review in 1882; it became Iron Trade Review in 1888; and Steel, "The Metalworking Management Weekly" in 1930. In January 1970, the publication changed its name and focus again, this time to IndustryWeek. Between 1970 and 2000, its tagline and publication frequency changed several times, finally settling to a monthly format in 2001.
