= Business Nashville =

- Format: Print and online
- Publisher: Eagle Communications, Inc. (acquired by NashvillePost.com in 2001)
- Country: USA
- Based in: Nashville, Tennessee
- Language: English

Business Nashville Magazine, a regional glossy, was published monthly with a local circulation of about 16,000 until it was acquired by NashvillePost.com in 2001. In 2003, it began publishing as Business Tennessee. The publication focused on business and political happenings in Tennessee with a circulation of near 40,000 statewide. It was published in both online and traditional formats.
