= Creative Loafing =

Publisher in Atlanta, Georgia, US

- Type: Private
- Industry: Publishing
- Founded: 1972
- Fate: Sold to Ben Eason in February, 2017 by SouthComm Publishing following a brief ownership by hedge fund Atalaya
- Headquarters: Atlanta, Georgia, United States
- Products: Alternative weekly newspapers in Atlanta.
- Owner: Deborah and Chick Eason (1972–2000); Ben Eason (2000–2009); Atalaya Capital Management (2009–2012); SouthComm (2012–2017); Ben Eason (2017–current)
- Website: creativeloafing.com

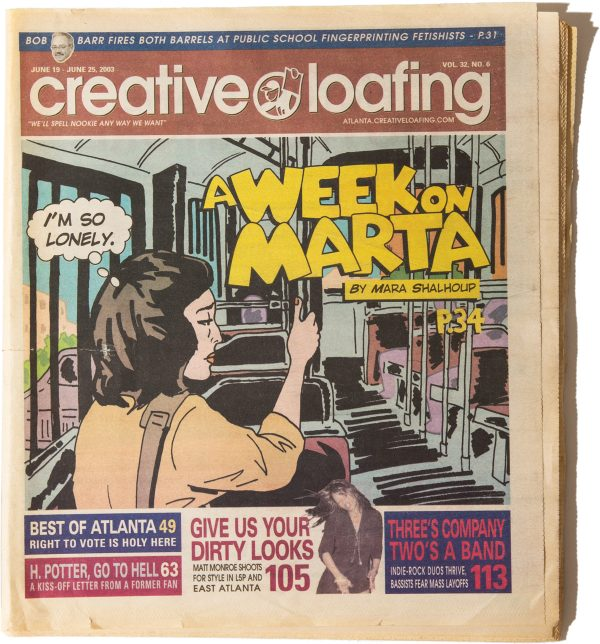
Early 2000s Creative Loafing paper

Creative Loafing is an Atlanta-based publisher of an arts and culture news and events newspaper/magazine. The company historically published a weekly publication that once had a 160,000 weekly circulation. While Creative Loafing is no longer publishing a newspaper, it continues to be Atlanta's primary calendar of cultural events. The company has historically been a part of the alternative weekly newspapers association in the United States.

Creative Loafing began as a family-owned business in 1972 by Deborah and Chick Eason, expanding to other cities in the Southern United States in the late 1980s and 1990s. In 2007 it doubled its circulation with the purchase of the Chicago Reader and Washington City Paper; the $40 million debt it incurred, along with a Great Recession, forced the company into bankruptcy one year later. The parent company, Creative Loafing, Inc. was dissolved and Atalaya sold off the Chicago Reader. In 2012, SouthComm purchased all of the properties and then sold off each of the papers to other publishers in 2018.

The Atlanta Creative Loafing launched the career of many writers and has been an institution in Atlanta's cultural scene. The Parrotheads of Jimmy Buffett fame were launched from an ad in Creative Loafing in the 1990s. Best-selling author and American humorist Hollis Gillespie by debuting her weekly column "Moodswing," which first appeared in 2001 and ran for eight years. Jill Rhodes, the ex-wife of Sean Hannity, was the managing editor of the newspaper 1993–1996 until their move to New York City, which commenced Sean Hannity's television career. Mara Shaloup won a Clarion Award for her work breaking the Black Mafia story in 2006. Investigative reporter and CL Editor CB Hackworth's piece on racial segregation brought Oprah Winfrey to Forsyth County to confront overt racism in 1987.

== Holdings ==
Creative Loafing, LLC is the name of the Publishing Company that owns Creative Loafing. Creative Loafing, LLC purchased the assets of Creative Loafing Atlanta from SouthComm in February 2017, which put the paper back into the Eason family's hands.

- Creative Loafing (Atlanta) of Atlanta, Georgia, sold in July 2012 to SouthComm Communications
- Chicago Reader of Chicago, Illinois, sold in May 2012 to Wrapports
- Creative Loafing Charlotte of Charlotte, North Carolina, sold in October 2011 to SouthComm, sold in August 2014 to Womack Newspapers
- Creative Loafing Sarasota of Sarasota, Florida, sold in December 2010 to the Sarasota Herald-Tribune, merged into Ticket
- Creative Loafing Tampa of Tampa, Florida, sold in October 2011 to SouthComm
- Washington City Paper of Washington, D.C., sold in July 2012 to SouthComm
- Creative Loafing filed for bankruptcy protection in 2008 during the crash. At the time it declared bankruptcy, Creative Loafing owned six alternative weeklies and was the nation's 2nd largest publisher of alternative weeklies behind the Village Voice Company.

Other newspapers the company published over its 40-year history included:

- Creative Loafing Greenville of Greenville, South Carolina, sold in 2001 to Debby Eason, renamed MetroBEAT, folded in 2005
- Creative Loafing Savannah of Savannah, Georgia, sold in 2001 to Debby Eason, merged into Connect Savannah
- Gwinnett Loaf in north suburban Atlanta, Georgia, closed in April 2001
- The Scene nightlife weekly of Atlanta, Georgia, closed in March 2001
- The Spectator of Raleigh-Durham, North Carolina, 1997–2002, sold to Independent Weekly
- Topside Loaf in north suburban Atlanta, Georgia, closed in April 2001

== History ==
=== Early years in Atlanta ===
Deborah Eason, a photographer for Delta Air Lines, and Elton "Chick" Eason, a math professor at Georgia State University, founded Creative Loafing Atlanta in 1972 after the couple attended a 25-attendee Georgia State University lecture by a visiting Russian scholar. This, and other poorly attended events, convinced them to start Creative Loafing Atlanta to inform the public about all of the city's cultural happenings—festivals, concerts, Wicca meetings. They originally began publishing it from the basement of their home in the Morningside neighborhood of Atlanta. After a trial run of a monthly magazine called P-s-s-t . . . A Guide to Creative Loafing in Atlanta, the Easons decided to launch a weekly free publication titled simply Creative Loafing. The four-person editorial staff operated out of the living and dining rooms of the Easons' Morningside home; the darkroom was in the basement. The print run of the first edition—all of eight pages—was 12,000 copies.

=== Expansion in the South ===
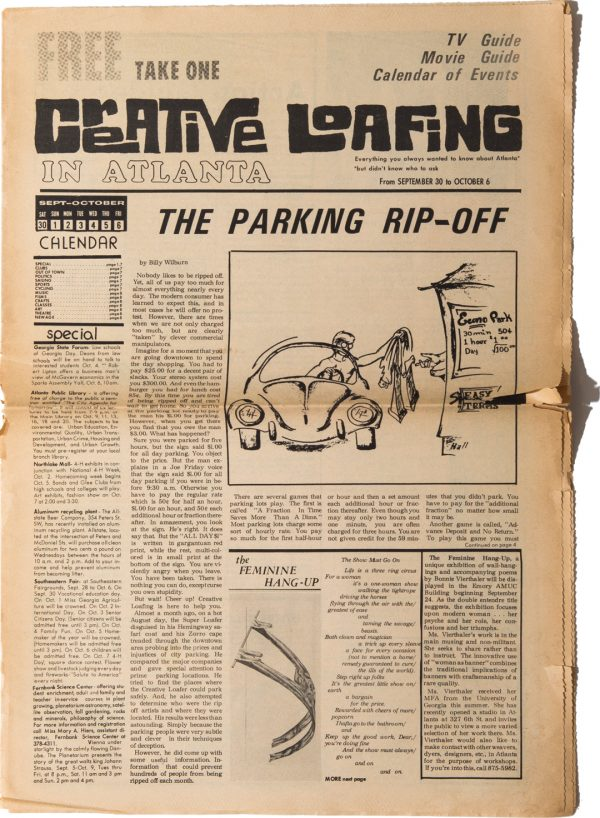
Early 1970s copy of Creative Loafing

Creative Loafing was not the first alternative weekly Atlanta had seen, but over the years, its size and ambitions crowded out competitors—The Great Speckled Bird; Poets, Artists & Madmen; The Sunday Paper. After a decade and a half in Atlanta, the Easons established new Creative Loafing weeklies in March 1987 in Charlotte, North Carolina, and in 1988 in Tampa, Florida. Other expansions or acquisitions included newspapers in Greenville, South Carolina; Raleigh, North Carolina; and Savannah, Georgia. The company also expanded its footprint in the Atlanta area, starting two community weeklies, Gwinnett Loaf and Topside Loaf, covering the suburbs north of the city in Cobb, Gwinnett, southern Forsyth and northern Fulton counties. Bowing to reader complaints about racy advertisements in Creative Loafing Atlanta, the Easons established a separate Atlanta publication, The Scene, for nightlife listings. These three Atlanta-area publications would later be folded back into Creative Loafing Atlanta in 2001.

By July 2007, Creative Loafing became a mini-empire with four papers in three states and purchased two heralded alt-weeklies—the Chicago Reader and the Washington City Paper—and The Straight Dope, a longtime Reader-syndicated column by Cecil Adams.

=== Sale to Eason Children ===
Ben Eason, son of Deborah and Elton, purchased the Tampa paper from his parents in 1994 and changed its name to the Weekly Planet. In 1998 he expanded the paper and launched a second Weekly Planet in Sarasota, Florida.

Two years later, in September 2000, he and his two sisters led a group of investors to purchase a controlling interest in the entire Creative Loafing chain, and subsequently brought the Planet papers into the fold. After a false start during which the May 31, 2006, edition of Tampa's Planet was prematurely published with a Creative Loafing banner, the Tampa paper officially reverted to its former name and the Sarasota paper became Creative Loafing Sarasota.

Shortly after the sale, Debby Eason purchased Creative Loafing's Greenville and Savannah properties back from her children. The Greenville paper was renamed MetroBEAT, while Creative Loafing Savannah was merged into Connect Savannah.

=== Partnership with Cox ===
To help finance the 2000 deal transferring ownership to Ben Eason's group, media conglomerate Cox Enterprises purchased a 25% minority share of the company for approximately US$5 million. In the process, Cox executives filled two seats on Creative Loafing's eight-member board. An uneasy four-year relationship between the two companies followed, as Cox also owned Atlanta's only daily, The Atlanta Journal-Constitution, as well as television and radio outlets in the Atlanta area. After the Journal-Constitution in April 2003 quietly launched its own free entertainment weekly named Access Atlanta, in direct competition with Creative Loafing, the Easons and Creative Loafing board members voted to censure the two Cox executives for unethical conduct, and by June 2004 both companies agreed to allow the chain to repurchase its shares from Cox.

=== Chicago and Washington ===
On July 24, 2007, Creative Loafing announced the purchase of the Washington City Paper and the Chicago Reader, along with the Reader's properties The Straight Dope and the SDMB, the associated Internet message board.

In order to accomplish the acquisitions, the company borrowed $40 million. The ensuing economic slump hurt ad sales, and CL Inc. filed for Chapter 11 bankruptcy protection on September 29, 2008.

In a bankruptcy auction on August 25, 2009, Atalaya Capital Management of New York City, emerged as the new owner, paying $5 million (it was also CL's largest creditor, owed $30 million before the bankruptcy). The Easons had put in a bid of $2.3 million, and with the change in ownership, Ben Eason was removed as CEO.

=== Dissolution ===
Over the next two years, 2010–2011, Atalaya sold Creative Loafing's remaining mid-market papers. The first to be sold was Creative Loafing Sarasota, which was shuttered in December 2010, with its brand sold for an undisclosed sum to The New York Times Company, then-publisher of the competing Sarasota Herald-Tribune. The Herald-Tribune published its own free weekly product under the Creative Loafing name for some time after the sale.

In October 2011, Creative Loafing Charlotte and Creative Loafing Tampa were sold to SouthComm Inc., a publisher of alternative weeklies based in Nashville, Tennessee. Creative Loafing's three largest newspapers continued under Atalaya's ownership for one more year. In May 2012, the Chicago Reader was sold to Wrapports, publisher of the competing Chicago Sun-Times, in a deal reported at $3 million. Two months later, on July 3, Creative Loafing Atlanta and the Washington City Paper were sold to SouthComm Communications for an undisclosed sum, and CL Inc. ceased to exist.

In 2016, the Charlotte Creative Loafing was sold to Womack Publishing of North Carolina. In 2018, the Creative Loafing Charlotte was sold again and ceased publishing a print version. In 2017, Ben Eason re-purchased Creative Loafing Atlanta and it then went from weekly to monthly print publication. In 2018, Creative Loafing Tampa was sold to a group from Ohio. That same Creative Loafing Charlotte went online-only. In 2022, Creative Loafing Atlanta went online-only.
