= Self-build =

Practice of creating one's own individual house

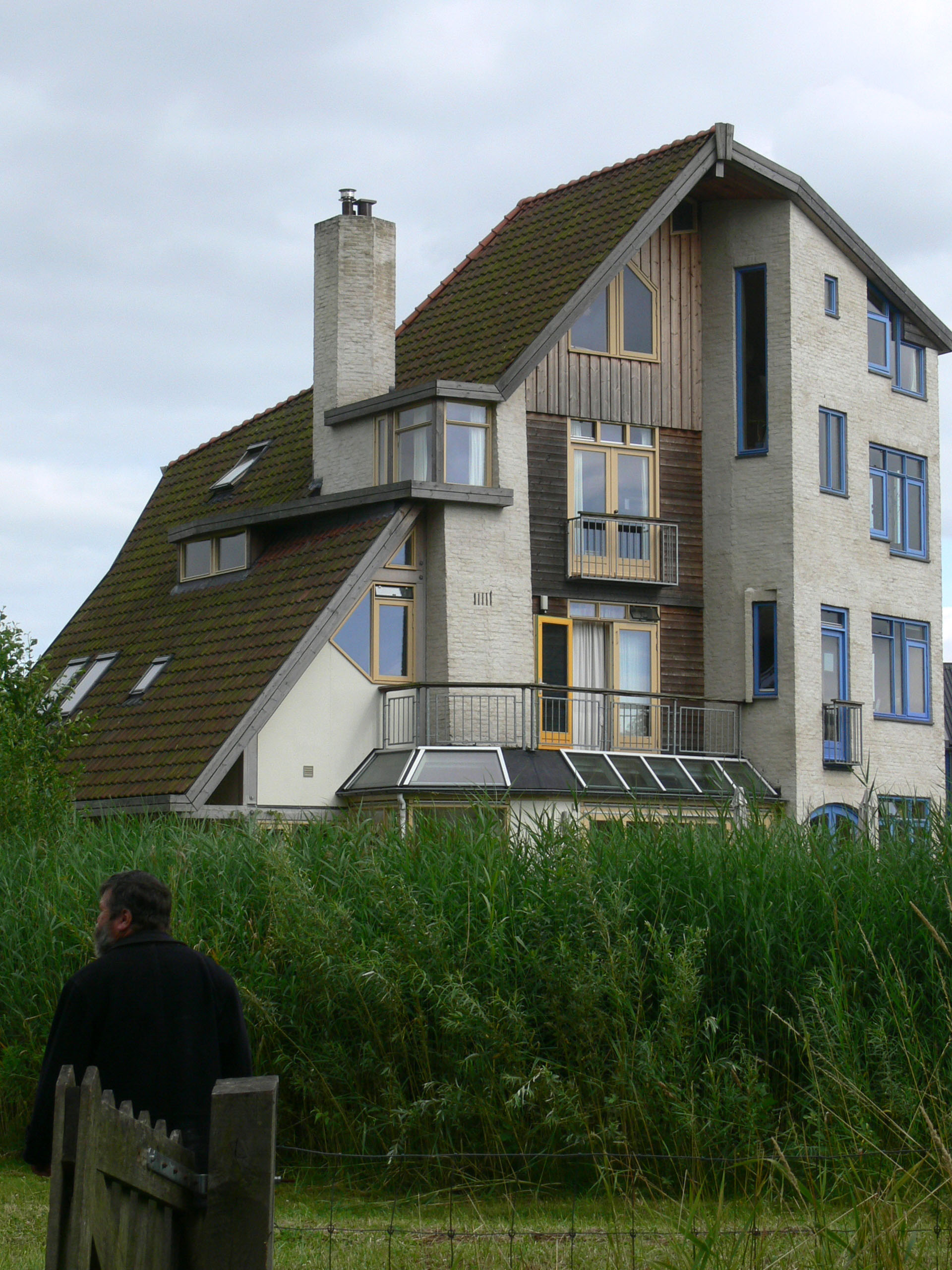
Self-build house (EVA Lanxmeer, Nederland)

Self-build is the process of creating an individual home or building through a variety of methods. The self-builder's input into this process varies from doing the actual construction, also known as DIY, to contracting certain works to an architect or building package company.

== Motivation ==
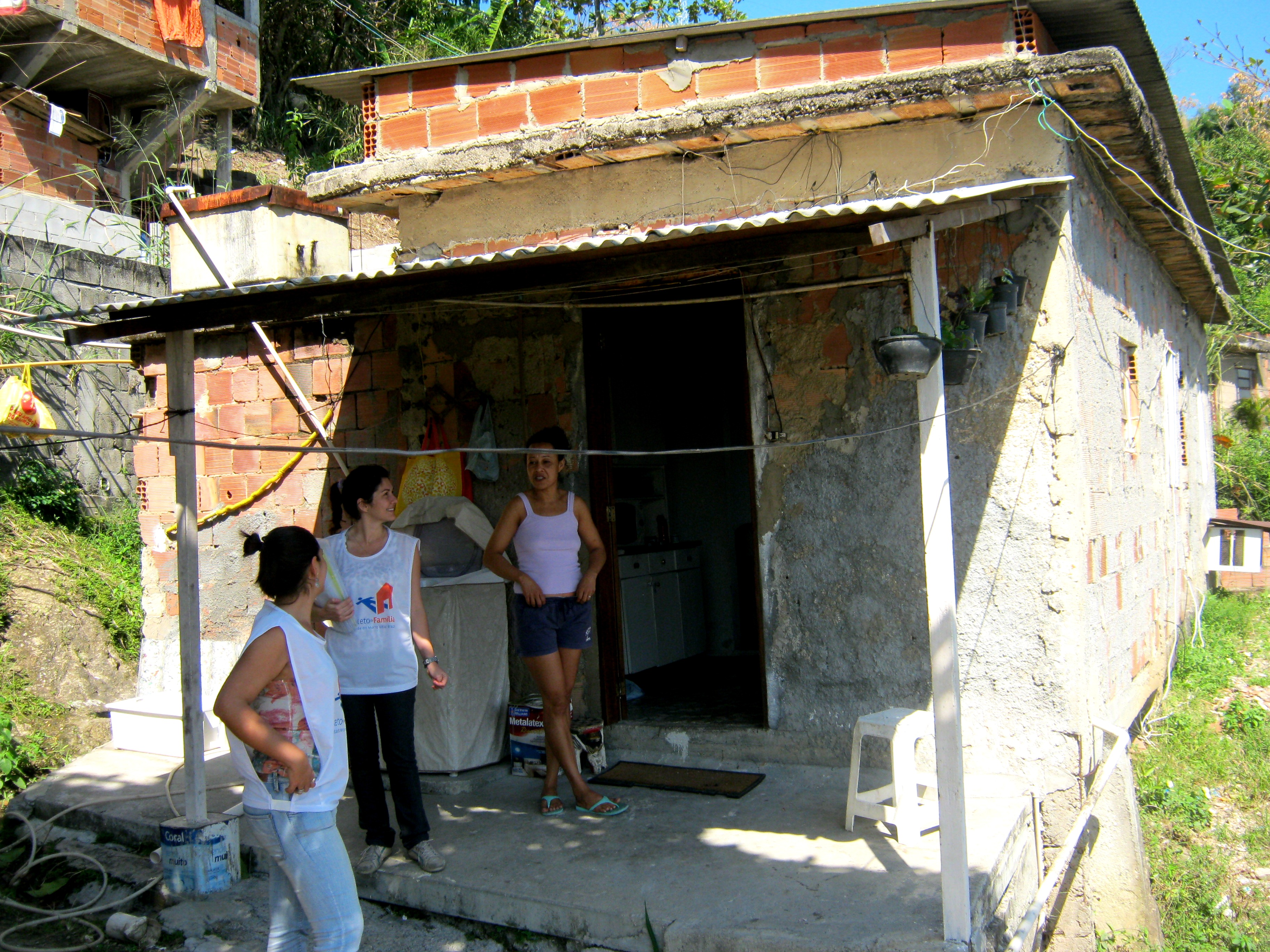
Social workers visiting a self-made renovation project of low-cost housing (Brazil)

People do self-build for many reasons. One common reason, especially in poorer countries, is that they may not be able to afford such housing on the open market. Another motivation can be the wish to create something tailored to their family's requirements and/or lifestyle.

== Methods ==
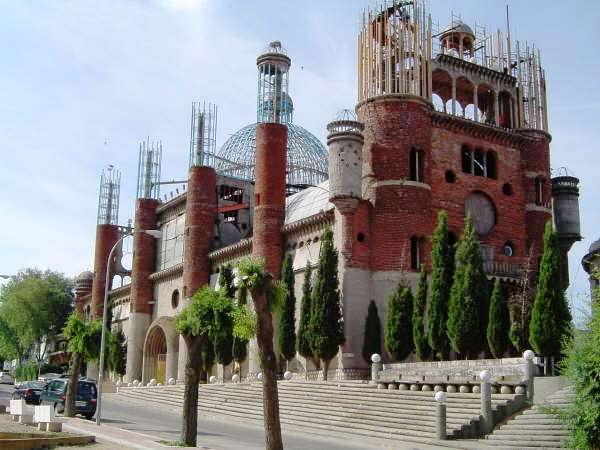
Cathedral of Justo Gallego Martínez, self-built over 40 years without formal architecture training(Mejorada del Campo, Spain).

Self-builders create their homes through a variety of methods, and seldom build it entirely themselves. In rich countries, many of them hire an architect to design the home, and a builder to construct it. Others use so-called 'package' companies to handle the entire project. Many others find themselves managing building sites and dealing directly with planners, tradespeople and materials suppliers.

== Extent ==
Self-build in its wider meaning is an ordinary practice in many developing countries. It is also common among certain religious communities like the Church of Jesus Christ of Latter-day Saints (LDS Church) or subcultures such as 'hippies'. Usually ecovillages are realised through self-building techniques. In most developed countries self-build is regulated by the public administration, while in developing countries self-build is sometimes supported by NGOs or international organisations like, for instance, United Nations Volunteers.

=== Ghana ===
In 2010 the World Bank estimated that self-build housing (also described as self-help or self-provided housing) was supplying more than 95% of Ghana's total housing stock, and that it was contributing around 300 billion USDs per annum to the national economy. Self-build is not just practised by poorer households but also by middle-income citizens. Most of Ghana's post-colonial governments, such as Nkrumah's, have been implementing state-run housing schemes because their socialist-oriented agendas sought to discourage self-help housing in order to constrain private ownership by individuals or families. In 2009, the Government of Ghana, in its Draft National Shelter Policy, recognized the importance of self-help and self-build housing and other non-conventional approaches to housing, even if not as a priority.

=== Italy ===
In Italy self-build has been, for some decades after World War II, a common practice among the lower class, widely used in squatting areas like the Borgate Romane (Rome) or the suburbs in the north of Naples and around Palermo. Nowadays self-build is rather used as a partial support to house building where the construction of the structural parts (foundation, walls, roof ....) is committed to professionals companies. Another application field for self-build in Italy is the support to disadvantaged ethnic groups like Sinti. In some middle-sized cities like Ravenna and Padua masonry classes and build materials were offered to people living in gypsies equipped areas in order to help them to improve their huts. In the early 1980s self-build also entered the Italian university programmes: in the architecture faculty of Politecnico di Torino Giorgio Ceragioli introduced in his course of Architectural technology the Laboratorio tecnologico di autocostruzione (Latec), a laboratory where students were allowed to practice several self-build techniques.

=== Mexico ===
In Mexico a very rapid urbanization occurred between 1940s and 1970s, attracting much migration from rural areas. During this period government programmes were not able to ensure enough housing and also the private production was unattractive due to the low wages of a large part of the population. It is estimated that even after the creation of two national housing funds, FONHAPO and INFONAVIT, just 1/5 of the effective demand was satisfied. In this difficult situation, many irregular settlements developed, and some researcher and politician started to sustain that supporting and improving self-build processes rather to fight them was a possible solution to the popular housing issue. So during 1970s public policy started to support low-income self-builder offering them services, core units and in some cases land-ownership regularization. These schemes were criticised by orthodox Marxists, persuaded that ensuring proper housing to people was a government duty and that lack of houses was a structural product of capitalism. Anyway, self-built accommodation became the most common form of housing and, in Mexico City area, it increased from 14% in 1952 to 60% in 1990. Later on, the public policy priority shifted from house production to enhancement of real-estate market, local infrastructures and improvement of existing houses.

=== United Kingdom ===
The term 'self build' is specifically used in the UK and Ireland when an individual obtains a building plot and then builds their own home on that plot. The term doesn't necessarily refer to completing the work yourself - more usually, self-build is defined as the act of 'commissioning' a bespoke home.

It's estimated that there are between 10,000 and 20,000 self builds in the UK every year. This is less than 10% of all the homes built annually but may constitute as much as 1 in 3 new detached homes built in the UK. Over the years, self-builders have been at the forefront of advances in-house design and technology, being responsible for the dramatic uptake in recent years in eco-features such as solar power and heat pumps; underfloor heating; open plan design and smart home technology. These are features that take many years to filter through to commercial housing developments. There is also an increasing drive for people to self-build overseas, either as investments, holiday homes, retirement homes or relocation.

Individual houses can take all forms from the traditional to the radically modern, and the term is also used to refer to people who create individual homes out of old buildings.

==== Current Issues ====
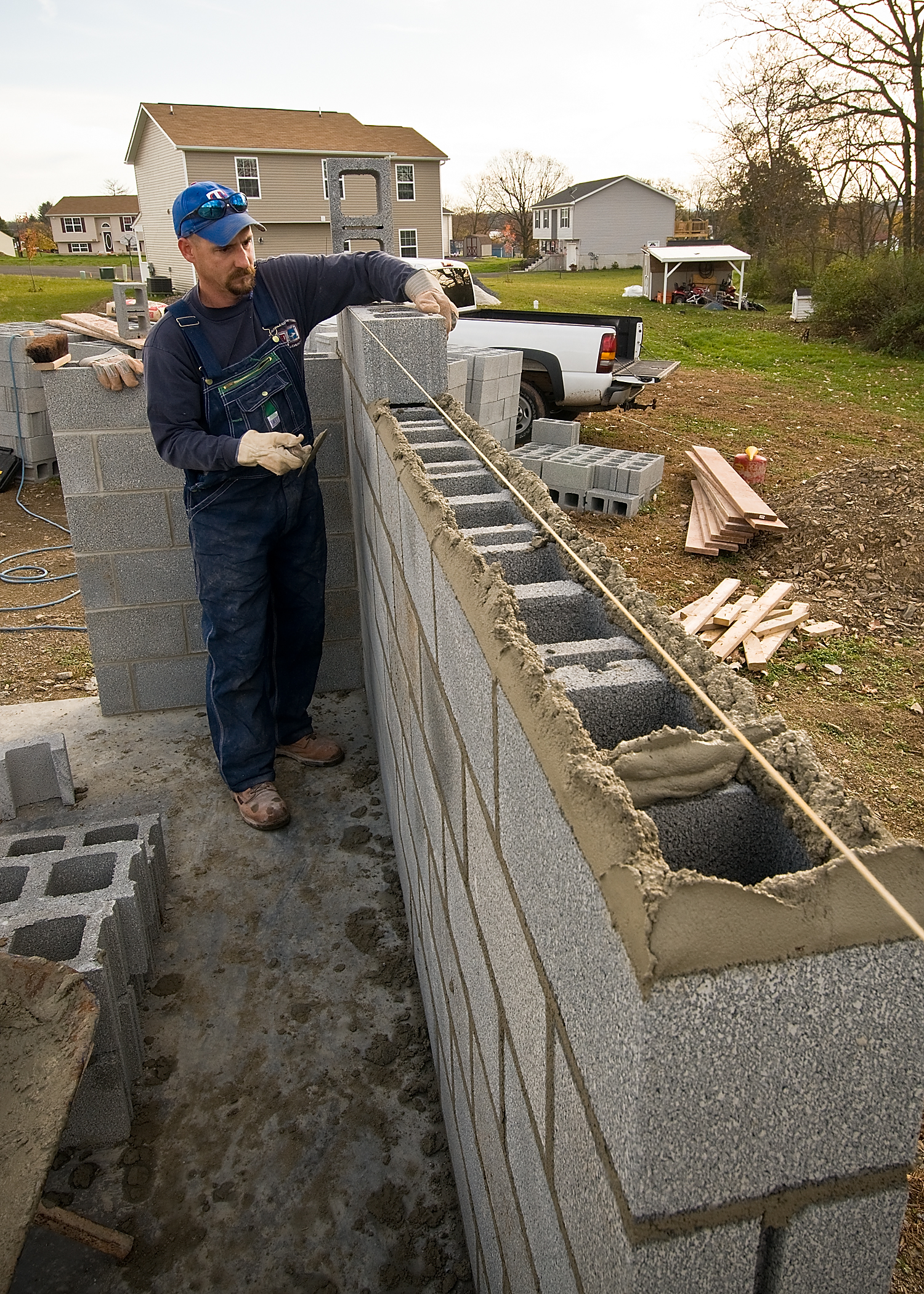
Self-build housing in Pennsylvania.

The main impediment to the UK self-build market is the shortage of building plots available to the self-builder, high land prices and the restrictive planning regime. in 2008 the National Self Build Association (NaSBA) was established to order to put pressure on relevant bodies, including the Government, to remedy this situation. The founding members of NaSBA are Bath and District Self Build Association, Build It magazine, BuildStore, Potton/Kingspan, Architecture Verte and Ecomotive. The Association changed its name to the National Custom & Self Build Association (NaCSBA) in July 2014 – borne out of a desire to officially welcome the custom build community.

Since 2016, local authorities in England are required to maintain a register of people and groups who want to build their own home.

== See also ==
- Green building
- Walter Segal
- Custom Builder

== Books ==
- Broome, Jon (2007). The Green Self-Build Book: How to design and build your own eco-home. Foxhole, Dartington, Totnes, Devon: Green Books. ISBN 978-1-903998-73-1.
- Pollan, Michael (1997). A Place of My Own: The Education of an Amateur Builder. New York: Random House. ISBN 978-0-679-41532-9.
