= Hollis Gillespie =

Author and columnist

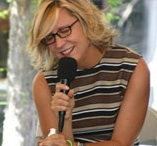
Hollis Gillespie, Atlanta author and humor columnist

Hollis Gillespie is a humor columnist, writer and comedian based in Atlanta, Georgia. She wrote for Atlanta's Creative Loafing weekly for eight years until October 2008. In 2004, Writers Digest named Hollis Gillespie a "Breakout Author of the Year." Other accolades include the "Best Columnist" (2001, 2002, 2005, 2006, 2007, 2008, 2009) and "Best Local Author" (2004, 2005, 2006, 2008, 2009) honors in the Creative Loafing "Best of Atlanta" Readers Survey. Atlanta magazine awarded her "Best 'Tell-All'" in 2006. In 2012, the Magazine Association of the Southeast granted a MAGS award to Hollis Gillespie for "Editorial Excellence."

Gillespie currently writes the "Ugly American" column for Paste Magazine and appears as a travel expert for NBC's Today Show, NBC's 11Alive, and as an on-air commentator for the WGCL-TV Atlanta CBS News Channel 46. From 2007–2014, she wrote the back-page column for Atlanta (magazine). and a commentator on NPR's All Things Considered. She is the author of the books Bleachy-Haired Honky Bitch, Confessions of a Recovering Slut, and Trailer Trashed. Upon publication of her first book, Hollis Gillespie appeared as a guest on The Tonight Show with Jay Leno. Jay Leno called her "a very funny lady." The rights to her first book, Bleachy-Haired Honky Bitch, were optioned by both Sony Pictures and Paramount. She has collaborated on film projects with Laura Dern, (star of HBO's Enlightened), Mitch Hurwitz (creator of Arrested Development), Amy Sherman Palladino (creator of Gilmore Girls), Bill Haber (producer of Rizzoli and Isles) and Sheri Elwood (creator of Call Me Fitz). In addition, she runs the Shocking Real Life Learning Center, which offers classes on social media, book writing, publishing, animation, film and television script writing. She is represented by the Creative Artists Agency in Los Angeles.

Hollis Gillespie is also a former flight attendant at Delta, where she was a qualified foreign-language interpreter in English, German and Spanish. Her fifth book, a YA fiction novel, was published in 2015. The title is We Will be Crashing Shortly.

== Published works ==
- My Dubious Efforts Toward Upward Mobility
- Confessions of a Recovering Slut: And Other Love Stories
- Bleachy-Haired Honky Bitch: Tales from a Bad Neighborhood
- Unaccompanied Minor.
