= Professional Builder =

American trade magazine

- Type: Business magazine
- Format: Paper and online magazine
- Owner(s): Endeavor Business Media
- Founded: 1936; 89 years ago
- Language: English
- ISSN: 1072-0561
- Website: www.probuilder.com

Professional Builder is a trade publication and website focused on residential and light construction.

It is published monthly with two additional issues in the fall (usually mid September or October) and December. The fall issue is called the Builder's Own Issue, which provides a look at the homes that builders build for themselves and the products they have chosen. The December issue focuses on the International Builders' Show, which previews products from the event. It also awards "Builder of the Year".

== History ==
The magazine was launched in 1936 as Practical Builder.

It was acquired by Cahner's, a division of RELX. It was based in Des Plaines, Illinois and then Newton, Massachusetts and then Oak Brook, Illinois.

In April 2010, the magazine was closed.

In May 2010, it was acquired by MB Media. In July 2010, MB Media formed a partnership with Scranton Gillette Communications to operate the magazine.

In August 2024, it was acquired by Endeavor Business Media.

== Awards and recognition ==
In 2007, the Professional Builder Show Village 07 – Across Generations received the Integrated Marketing Award for best total integrated program from the Media Industry Newsletter.
