= Movimento Sviluppo e Pace =

Humanitarian organization

Movimento sviluppo e pace
- Abbreviation: MSP
- Formation: 27 December 1968
- Founder: Giorgio Ceragioli, Giovanni Giovannini
- Founded at: Turin
- Legal status: NGO; Nonprofit organization
- Leader: Piergiorgio Gilli
- Main organ: President
- Website: https://www.msptorino.org/

Movimento Sviluppo e Pace lit. 'Movement Development and Peace') is a humanitarian NGO that implements projects for sustainable development in poor countries. It was founded by Giorgio Ceragioli and Giovanni Giovannini in 1968 in Turin (Italy).

== History ==
Giorgio Ceragioli, Giovanni Giovannini (a journalist who was later president of La Stampa and ANSA) and the other founders of Movimento sviluppo e pace aimed to promote cooperation among people for a sustainable self-development in the poorest countries of the world, focused on the real needs of the concerned populations. Giovannini was the first president of the NGO and Ceragioli its first director. The new NGO was different from similar associations of the time because it was independent from religious beliefs and political memberships, and in spite of the Cold War climate was able to brig together Catholic and Marxist volunteers.

In 1982 Sviluppo e ace was recognised as partner NGO from the Italian Ministry of Foreign Affairs. In 1998 it also had recognised a status of Nonprofit organization and, on 19 March 1999, was named Ente morale.

MSP nowadays supports projects mainly based on local human resources at any hierarchy level, and only in a few cases employs abroad Italian staff on long-duration basis. The members of the NGO mainly visit the partner organizations in order to offer them advice and counsel about new projects and monitoring the ongoing ones. MSP also sustains creation and growth of local NGOs. One of the most important actions of this kind has been, in cooperation with ASSEFA Italia, the support given in India to the Association for Sarva Seva Farms, connected to the Gandhian movement of Sarvodaya.

== Geographic focus ==
- Projects and activities in Italy:
  - Centro di documentazione sul Terzo mondo (CDTM) – established in 1968, between 1970 and 1993 published the magazine Terzo Mondo Informazioni. It runs a public library with a video archive. It also distributes photographic exhibitions and multimedia products about the countries in which MSP operates;
  - MSP organises and manages classes devoted to public librarians, teachers and 2nd generations immigrants on international solidarity issues;
  - MSP takes part and/or supports ethical banking, sustainable tourism and business ethics projects as well as human rights and common goods campaigns;
  - following a request of the government of the Republic of Cabo Verde MSP fulfills since 1976 the role of consul with jurisdiction on Piedmont; the consulate office is located in the NGO headquarters in Turin.;
  - the NGO offers some services to refugees and new immigrants.
- Projects and activities in the Global South: MSP operates (or operated in the past) in
  - Asia – Bangladesh, Philippines, India, Lebanon;
  - America Latina – Argentina, Bolivia, Brazil, Chile, Colombia, Ecuador, Guatemala, Haiti, Peru, Mexico;
  - Africa – Benin, Burkina Faso, Cameroon, Cabo Verde, Chad, Democratic Republic of the Congo, Ivory Coast, Ethiopia, Kenya, Madagascar, Mali, Mozambique, Central African Republic, Nigeria, Rwanda, Senegal, Niger, Tanzania, Togo, Tunisia.

== Funding and grant making ==
The organization is mainly sponsored by private donors (90.68% of its budget).
