= EndeavorB2B =

American business-to-business media company

- Founded: December 2017; 8 years ago
- Founder: Chris Ferrell
- Headquarters location: Nashville, Tennessee
- Key people: Chris Ferrell (CEO)
- Publication types: Magazines, newsletters, books, maps, directories, databases
- Official website: www.endeavorbusinessmedia.com

EndeavorB2B (previously known as Endeavor Business Media), headquartered in Nashville, Tennessee, publishes trade publications and related websites and hosts related events.

== History ==
The company was founded by Chris Ferrell, former CEO of SouthComm Communications, and others in December 2017.

In January 2018, Endeavor acquired the Process Flow Network from Grand View Media.

In June 2018, it acquired the remaining assets of SouthComm Communications.

In November 2019, the company acquired 20 former PennWell brands from UK-based Clarion Events and Informa Intelligence's industry/infrastructure and transportation divisions.

In April 2021, the company acquired and relaunched the LightSpec West trade show.

In March 2022, the company acquired BUILDINGS and Interior+sources magazines.

In April 2022, the company acquired New South Research. It also acquired Construction Business Media, Architectural Products and Architectural SSL magazine publisher.

In May 2022, the company acquired Putman Media, which owns Chemical Processing, Control, Control Design, Food Processing, Pharma Manufacturing, Plant Services, Smart Industry, and The Journal.

In August 2024, the company acquired Professional Builder, ProRemodeler, and Building Design+Construction as well as several related trade shows: Pro Builder Show Village, the Women in Residential + Commercial Construction Conference, and Pro+Connect, all from Scranton Gillette Communications.

The company rebranded to EndeavorB2B in 2025.

== Awards and recognition ==
In 2022, the company ranked 1784th on the Inc. 5000.

== Publications ==
The following is a list of brands of Endeavor Business Media:

- Architectural Products
- Architectural SSL
- Aviation Pros
- Building Design+Construction
- Chemical Processing
- Contractor
- Control
- Control Design
- EC&M
- Electronic Design
- Firehouse Magazine
- Food Processing
- Healthcare Innovation
- IndustryWeek
- Offshore
- Oil & Gas Journal
- Pharma Manufacturing
- Plant Services
- Professional Builder
- ProRemodeler
- SecurityInfoWatch.com
- Smart Industry
- The Journal
