= Nashville Scene =

Newspaper in Nashville, Tennessee

- Type: Alternative weekly
- Format: Tabloid
- Owner: Freeman Webb Company
- Publisher: Mike Smith
- Editor: D. Patrick Rodgers
- Founded: 1989
- Headquarters: 210 12th Ave. South, Ste. 100; Nashville, TN 37203; US
- Circulation: 38,000
- OCLC number: 1035130202
- Website: nashvillescene.com

Nashville Scene is an alternative newsweekly in Nashville, Tennessee. It was founded in 1989, became a part of Village Voice Media in 1999, and later joined the ranks of sixteen other publications after a merger of Village Voice Media with New Times Media early in 2006. The paper was acquired by SouthComm Communications in 2009. Since May 2018, it has been owned by the Freeman Webb Company. The publication mainly reports and opines on music, arts, entertainment, and local and state politics in Nashville.

== The City Press ==
In 1989, Ed Richey, Gordon Inman, and Chuck Snyder sold Nashville Scene to Albie Del Favero and group of investors.

In 1989, after years as a national newspaper sales representative based in New York, Albie Delfavero recognized the need of his hometown, Nashville, to have an alternative weekly paper. The "alternative paper" format made news in cities across the country, especially on the east coast. The industry itself made news, took journalistic risk, provided arts criticism, schedules, and "happenings", and did not mince words re local and national politics.

Delfavero enlisted Bruce Dobie, political reporter for Nashville's soon to be "late" daily, The Nashville Banner, to become editor. The both of them, with an array of investors, bought the "Scene" from Inman and transformed it from a driveway throw-away to a long respected voice in Nashville's civic, arts, and political community.

On 26 July 1996, the paper's editor, Bruce Dobie, and its publisher, Albie Del Favero, bought Nashville Scene for $2.5 million.

In 1999 "The City Press", as their corporation was dubbed in 1989, merged with The Village Voice.

== Village Voice Media ==
In 1999, Del Favero and Dobie formed a group of investors and purchased Stern Publishing, then-owner of the Village Voice and five other alternative newsweeklies across the nation. They named the new corporation Village Voice Media. Village Voice publisher David Schneiderman, also one of the investors, became chief executive officer of the new venture.

In late 2004, both Del Favero and Dobie resigned their positions as publisher and editor of the Scene. The editor role was taken on by the Scene's then-news editor Liz Garrigan. Chris Ferrell was hired by Village Voice Media to assume the role of publisher at the beginning of 2005. In January 2006, Village Voice Media was acquired by New Times Media and kept the Village Voice Media name.

On September 27, 2007, Ferrell announced his resignation as publisher of the Nashville Scene and, two weeks later, was replaced by long-time Scene retail sales account executive Mike Smith, who took the title of associate publisher in line with the post-merger title structuring of Village Voice Media.

On May 6, 2008, Garrigan announced her resignation as editor on the Nashville Scene blog Pith in the Wind. She characterized her departure as "anticlimactic" and "not a protest resignation, a corporate cost-cutting measure or a veiled firing." She added that she had imposed a five-year expiration date for herself as editor, and would be cutting that short because she felt she had accomplished what she set out to accomplish. Garrigan's last day as Scene editor was slated for June 30, 2008.

== SouthComm Communications ==
On August 19, 2009, former Nashville Scene publisher Ferrell announced that his Nashville-based media company, SouthComm Communications, was acquiring Nashville Scene from Village Voice Media. SouthComm was formed in late 2007 and spent much of its first two years acquiring media properties in Alpharetta, Ga., Nashville, Tenn., and Louisville, Ky. Southcomm also owned the Nashville Post. Kotz was not retained as editor when the paper was purchased by SouthComm. Jim Ridley, who served as senior writer under Garrigan and managing editor under Kotz, was named editor. His tenure began with the September 3, 2009 issue.

On May 7, 2015, news editor Steve Cavendish announced that Daryl Cagle would contribute a weekly cartoon called "Metropolitan Planning Commission Funnies," focusing on city planning issues like umbilical houses, downtown cranes, Music Row demolitions and pop-up subdivisions. "Nashville is growing like a weed, and though officials talk about planning, they really just approve every stupid proposal." Cagle wrote on his blog.

On April 9, 2016, Scene editor-in-chief Jim Ridley died at the age of 50 after suffering a cardiac event while at work. He had been with the paper as its film critic since 1989.

Former news editor Steve Cavendish came back as the Scene's editor in July 2016. SouthComm enacted editorial layoffs a year later, and Cavendish was among those cut. Longtime staffer D. Patrick Rodgers — who previously served as music editor and managing editor — was named the Scene's editor in November 2017.

== Freeman Webb Company ==
In May 2018, the Nashville Scene and the Nashville Post were purchased by the Freeman Webb Company, a company co-founded by Bill Freeman and Jimmy Webb which owns and manages "more than 16,000 apartment units and 1 million square feet of office space" in Tennessee, Alabama, Missouri, Georgia and Mississippi.

== Freedom of the press ==
In 2024 Vanderbilt University police arrested a Nashville Scene reporter, who was released just hours later after a judge found no probable cause for his arrest. The Nashville district attorney additionally stated that he wouldn't charge a reporter for doing their job.
