= SouthComm Communications =

- Industry: Mass media
- Founded: 2007 in Nashville, Tennessee, United States
- Fate: acquired by Endeavor Business Media
- Headquarters: Nashville, United States
- Owner: Solidus
- Website: www.southcomm.com

SouthComm Communications was a media company that owned a number of alternative newspapers and other news sources in the United States such as the Nashville Scene and the Washington City Paper. It was based in Nashville, Tennessee. In 2018, the trade magazines owned by SouthComm were sold to Endeavor Business Media.

== History ==
SouthComm was formed in late 2007 and spent much of its first two years acquiring media properties in Alpharetta, Georgia, Nashville, Tennessee, and Louisville, Kentucky.

In 2011 and 2012, SouthComm bought a number of publications from Creative Loafing including the Washington City Paper in Washington, DC, Creative Loafing (Atlanta), Creative Loafing Charlotte of Charlotte, North Carolina, and Creative Loafing Tampa of Tampa, Florida. Womack Newspapers bought Creative Loafing Charlotte in 2014. Also in 2014, SouthComm acquired the trade publisher Cygnus Business Media.

In 2017 and 2018, the company began to sell their alternative newspapers to focus on their business to business magazines.

In 2017, Creative Loafing Atlanta was bought by Ben Eason, the son of Creative Loafing founders Debbie and Elton Eason. On December 21, 2017, it was announced that D.C.-area venture capitalist Mark Ein would buy the Washington City Paper. Also in December 2017, according to reports, The Pitch was sold to a local owner. In 2017 The Pitch was sold to Stephanie Carey and Adam Carey. Creative Loafing Tampa was sold to Euclid Media Group in 2018. In May 2018, real estate company Freeman Webb acquired the Nashville Scene and Nashville Post. In June 2018, the trade magazines owned by SouthComm were sold to Endeavor Business Media, which was started by SouthComm founder Chris Ferrell.
