= Editorial calendar =

An editorial calendar, or publishing schedule, is used by bloggers, publishers, businesses, and groups to control publication of content across different media, for example, newspaper, magazine, blog, email newsletters, and social media outlets.

Publishers also extract some of their editorial calendar data and make the data publicly available to attract advertisers. Public relations professionals also use these abbreviated editorial calendars to try to place stories for their clients. However, the primary purpose of editorial calendars is to control the publication of content to ensure regular appearance of content that interests readers and advertisers.

Traditional print publishers have used editorial calendars in some form for centuries to manage the publication of books, magazines, and newspapers. The internet has dramatically increased the number of publishers, who also need to organize content and ensure content is published at regular intervals.

Editorial calendars are used to define and control the process of creating content, from idea through writing and publication. An individual or small business might have this publishing process:

1. Brainstorm content ideas to publish, where to publish, and when to publish
2. Write each piece of content based on the publication schedule
3. Edit each piece of content
4. Publish each piece of content

A larger group might have this publishing process:

1. Brainstorm content ideas to publish, where to publish, and when to publish; include backup content items for each piece of content; include dates to determine whether to delay or kill each content item (for example, if a writer becomes ill or an interview subject is unavailable)
2. Assign each piece of content based on the publication schedule
3. Write each piece of content
4. Review the first draft of each piece of content
5. Give "go" or "no go" decision based on first draft edit and other criteria (then adjust the publishing schedule as needed)
6. If you go, finish writing each piece of content and submit draft content to the layout team, so they can plan their work
7. Perform final edit, copy edit, fact checking, and rewrites as needed
8. Submit piece of content for review by legal team
9. Make changes if or as needed based on legal input
10. Submit piece of content formally to layout team for their creation of artwork to be included with the published content
11. Post content on a development or test server and make final changes if needed
12. Publish content on the production server or other media

Whether the publishing process is simple or complex, the movement is forward and iterative. Publishers encounter and cross a number of hurdles before a piece of content appears in print, on a website or blog, or in a social media outlet like Twitter or Facebook.

The details included and tracked in an editorial calendar depend upon the steps involved in publishing content for a publication, as well as what is useful to track. Too little or too much data make editorial calendars difficult to maintain and use. Some amount of tweaking of editorial calendar elements, while using the calendar to publish content, is required before they can be truly useful.

== Content creation process ==
In addition to the editorial process, each type of content has its own creation process that an editorial calendar must accommodate. The steps and effort to conduct, write, and publish an interview are different from those needed to publish an editorial. Understanding the different creation processes involved helps to set realistic dates in an editorial calendar.

Content ideas usually are created through brainstorming, based on current events, and other sources. Publications often group story ideas to be published on specific days of the week, for example, an environmental news site might publish research articles on Mondays and interviews with industry leaders on Thursdays. Grouping content helps train readers to return at regular intervals and makes it easier to organize advertising around these themes.

== Tools ==
Tools used to create an editorial calendar vary from paper to standalone tracking software integrated into publishing tools. There are at least four types of technology used to create an editorial calendar:

- Pieces of paper and a file folder
- A paper calendar or online calendar (for example, Google Calendar)
- A spreadsheet or online spreadsheet (for example, Excel or Google Docs)
- Editorial process tracking software in publishing software

Each of these technologies has its strengths and weaknesses. Most editorial calendars are spreadsheets or can be exported as a spreadsheet for review. The spreadsheet has tabs that reflect the publishing process, for example, a tab for story ideas, a tab for stories currently being written and edited, and a tab for published stories. There might be additional tabs to track editorial style decisions and scheduled changes to the blog that might impact publishing. Within each spreadsheet tab, there might be columns to track the name of the published piece, the assigned author, the publication destination, micro content (for example, subheadings and HTML alt and title tags to be used in links to the piece of content) and other useful information to track.

Some editorial calendars also track the responses to each piece of content, for example, the number of tweets, Facebook likes, and links to the content from third party websites. This performance data allows the publisher to identify content that appeals most to their readers and larger audience. These results, in turn, can be used to generate new story ideas and, if appropriate, attract advertisers.

== Structure and elements ==
Whether the publisher uses a paper calendar, a spreadsheet, or software integrated with their publishing tool, the calendar usually tracks publishing activities grouped into these sections:

- Story ideas
- Content production calendar
- Published content
- Glossary of terms or style decisions

Content then moves from one section to the next, from story idea to published content. The glossary and style decisions section contains details editors and authors need to ensure the publication retains a consistent style and tone. If a spreadsheet is used for an editorial calendar, each section would be a tab. If paper is used to track publication, a page for each section in a file folder with notes about style decisions and glossary might work.

Within each section of an editorial calendar, these elements might be tracked:

- Story title
- Author
- Publication date
- Media outlet (e.g. blog, print magazine, or email newsletter)
- Theme (or section)
- Priority
- Status (e.g. active or inactive)

There also might be columns to check off whether or not micro-content has been created, for example, story blurbs, subheadings, and search optimized descriptions for HTML links and tags. Or there might be columns to check off whether or not a legal review has been passed, images have been created for the story, or other parts of the actual publishing process.
