= NashvillePost.com =

Online news agency in Nashville, Tennessee, United States

- Type: Online newspaper
- Owner: F.W. Publishing
- Founded: 2000
- Headquarters: Nashville, Tennessee
- Website: nashvillepost.com

NashvillePost.com is an online news service covering business, politics and sports in the Nashville metropolitan area. It is locally owned and available by subscription.

NashvillePost.com competes with other daily news media in the Middle Tennessee area by pledging to offer a truly local approach to business, political and sports coverage, and does not offer the level of non-local coverage found in Gannett-owned daily newspaper The Tennessean, the weekly Nashville Business Journal (owned by the American City Business Journals chain) and other media outlets operated by out-of-town corporations. Its journalists report on Nashville-area business, politics and sports.

Bill Carey and David A. Fox conceived NashvillePost.com in 1999 and began publishing early in 2000; both were former business reporters for The Tennessean.

== History ==
Carey and Fox secured venture capital funding from Solidus Co., a locally owned company whose other investments include The Documentary Channel, small-town newspaper owner American Hometown Publishing Inc., stock market analysis firm New Constructs LLC and publicly held restaurant chain J. Alexander's Inc. Carey left NashvillePost.com at the end of 2000.

In 2001, NashvillePost.com acquired the monthly magazine Business Nashville, which was renamed as Nashville Post magazine and later reconceived, with a statewide focus, as Business Tennessee. In 2005, NashvillePost.com ceased publishing online as Fox departed to work with a hedge fund and run for a position on Nashville's school board, to which he was elected in August 2006. After three months, however, Solidus decided to revive the online service under a new operating team consisting of former Tennessean business journalist Richard Lawson, former political operative Ken Whitehouse, journalist/author E. Thomas Wood and the first full-time publisher at NashvillePost.com, Todd Staff.

In 2006, the new team rolled out a revamped website while breaking numerous business and political stories that attracted local attention. The news service brought a lawsuit against the Tennessee Lottery over its refusal to release records related to the firing of a senior executive following allegations of sexual harassment, and in May 2006, a Nashville judge ordered the state-sponsored lottery to turn over the documents.

Between May 2006 and May 2007, monthly pageviews at NashvillePost.com rose by more than 80 percent, according to statistics published by the news service.

On January 15, 2008, NashvillePost.com announced that it had been acquired during a significant acquisition spree by SouthComm, Inc., a regional niche media company created and majority-owned by Solidus Co. At that point, Geert De Lombaerde was named NashvillePost.com editor. In mid-2008, SouthComm acquired The City Paper (a topical daily paper that was founded in late 2000 and would cease operations in August 2013 after a nearly 13-year run). In late 2009, SouthComm acquired Nashville Scene, the city's alternative weekly.

After the SouthComm acquisition, NashvillePost.com received a second facelift and launched a daughter product called Post Politics devoted to up-to-the-minute coverage of local, state, and occasionally national politics and one called Post Business that aggregated locally relevant business news.

In March 2010,Nashville Post Magazine was relaunched with a circulation of 15,000 copies. The magazine continues to be published quarterly.

In October 2011, the Post and De Lombaerde named William Williams (a member of the original staff of The City Paper) managing editor. Prior to that point, Williams had contributed to the Post (both in a freelance capacity and via The City Paper) since late 2008. Of note, and as of mid-2021, De Lombaerde and Williams (who met in 2006) offered a combined 42-plus years of experience as members of the Nashville print media community, with the former focusing on banking and finance, economic development and publicly traded companies reporting and the latter upon real estate, transportation, retail and food-and-beverage industry coverage.

In 2013, then-City Paper Sports Editor David Boclair joined the Post, giving the publication a full sports coverage thrust.

From 2013 to mid-2018, the Post continued to evolve, with various younger journalists teaming with the veteran trio of De Lombaerde, Williams and Boclair to cover health care, government and technology, among other sectors.

In May 2018, the Nashville Scene and the Nashville Post were purchased by the Freeman Webb Publishing, a company co-founded by Bill Freeman and Jimmy Webb. FWP is a sister company to Freeman Webb Co., a real estate firm that owns and manages "more than 16,000 apartment units and 1 million square feet of office space" in Tennessee, Alabama, Missouri, Georgia and Mississippi.

In August 2019, Boclair left the Post to work for Sports Illustrated.

In April 2020, FWP President Frank Daniels named veteran Post employee Heather Cantrell Mullins as publisher. The evolution of Mullins' job dates to 2005, when she joined The City Paper as a sales and marketing rep.

De Lombaerde, after a 13.5-year run at editor, left the Post at the end of August 2021 to pursue work with a trade/specialty publications company, with state government and legal sector reporter Stephen Elliott assuming the role of interim editor.

By September 2021, the Post consisted of, in addition to Williams and Elliott, art director Christie Passarello, health care and technology reporter Kara Hartnett, Metro Government reporter Cedric Dent Jr., general assignment reporter Kathryn Rickmeyer, sports reporter Michael Gallagher and Gary Minnis (subscriptions, subscriber relations and magazine distribution).

In April 2023, the Post replaced Gallagher with veteran local sports journalist John Glennon, a former Tennessean reporter. As of mid-2023, the editorial team included, in addition to Glennon, the aforementioned Elliott and Williams, health care reporter Hannah Herner and art director Mary Louise Meadors (who replaced Passarello, with the latter having changed roles at FWP). Nicolle Praino was added as a reporter in mid-2023.

In February 2024, Elliott stepped down as Post editor to take a position with the Nashville Banner.

In summer 2024, Kevin Spain (a former USA Today editor of NBA coverage) was named Post editor.
