= Architectural technology =

Application of technology to the design and architecture of buildings

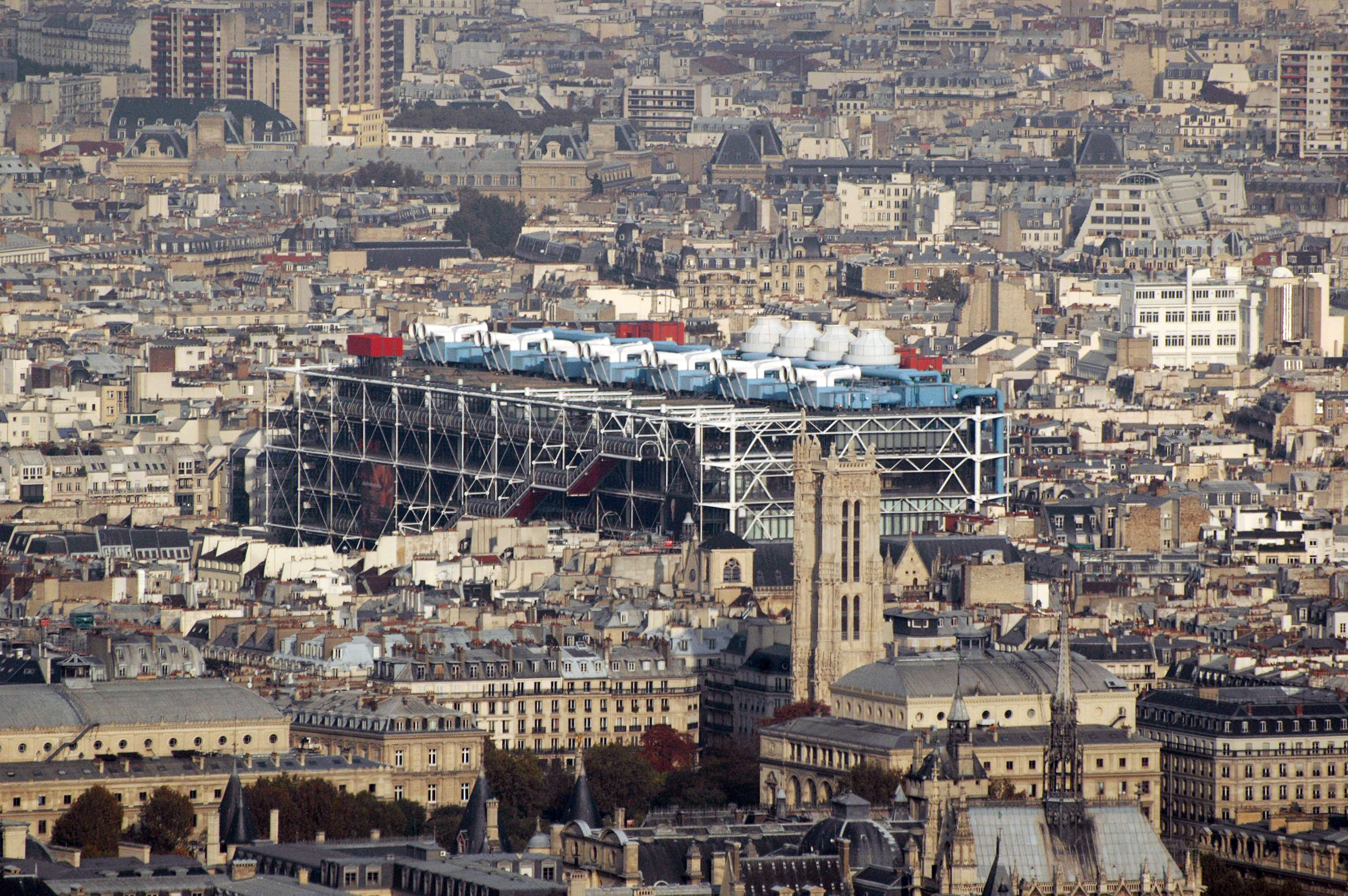
Pompidou centre in Paris

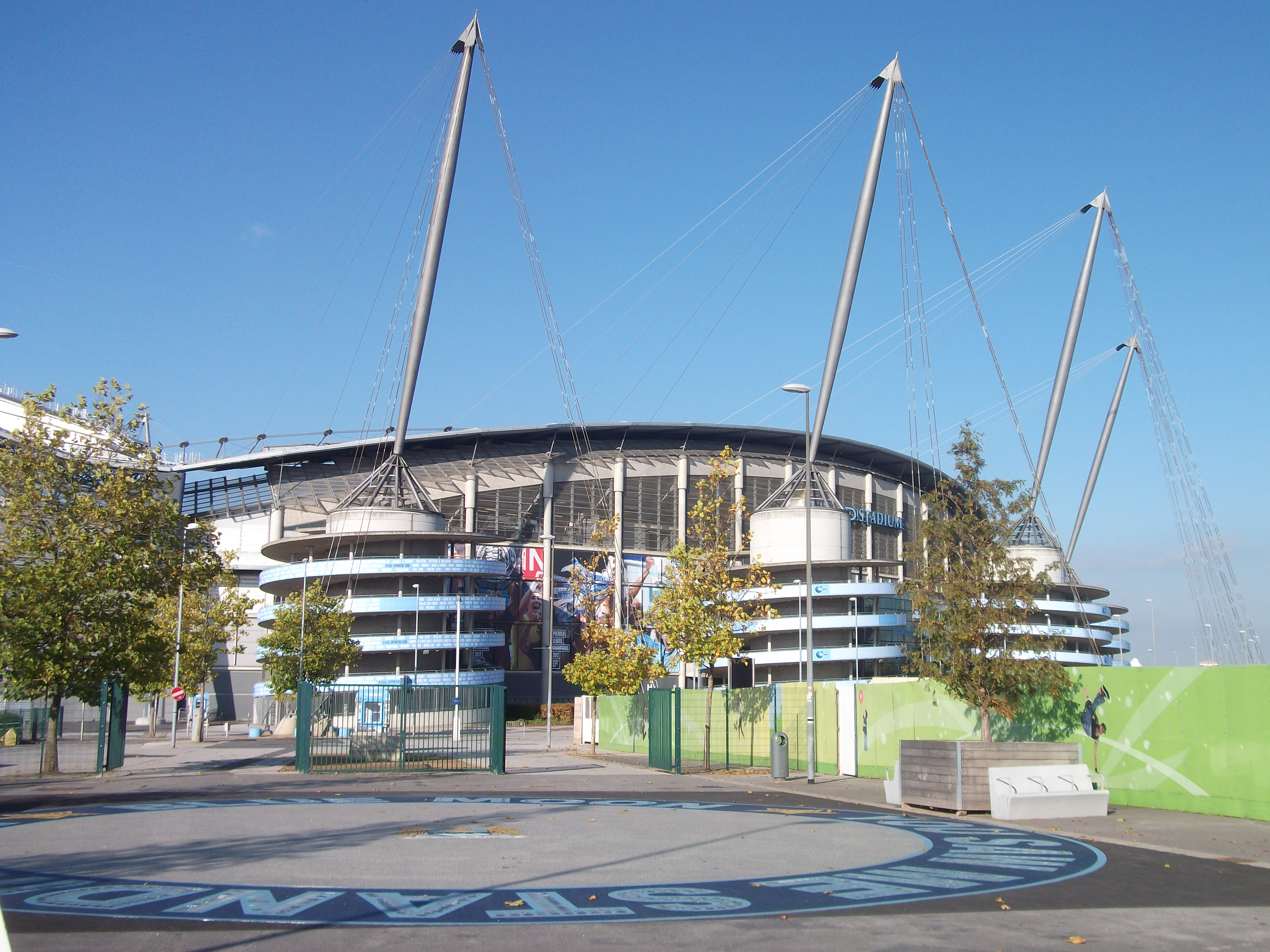
City of Manchester Stadium

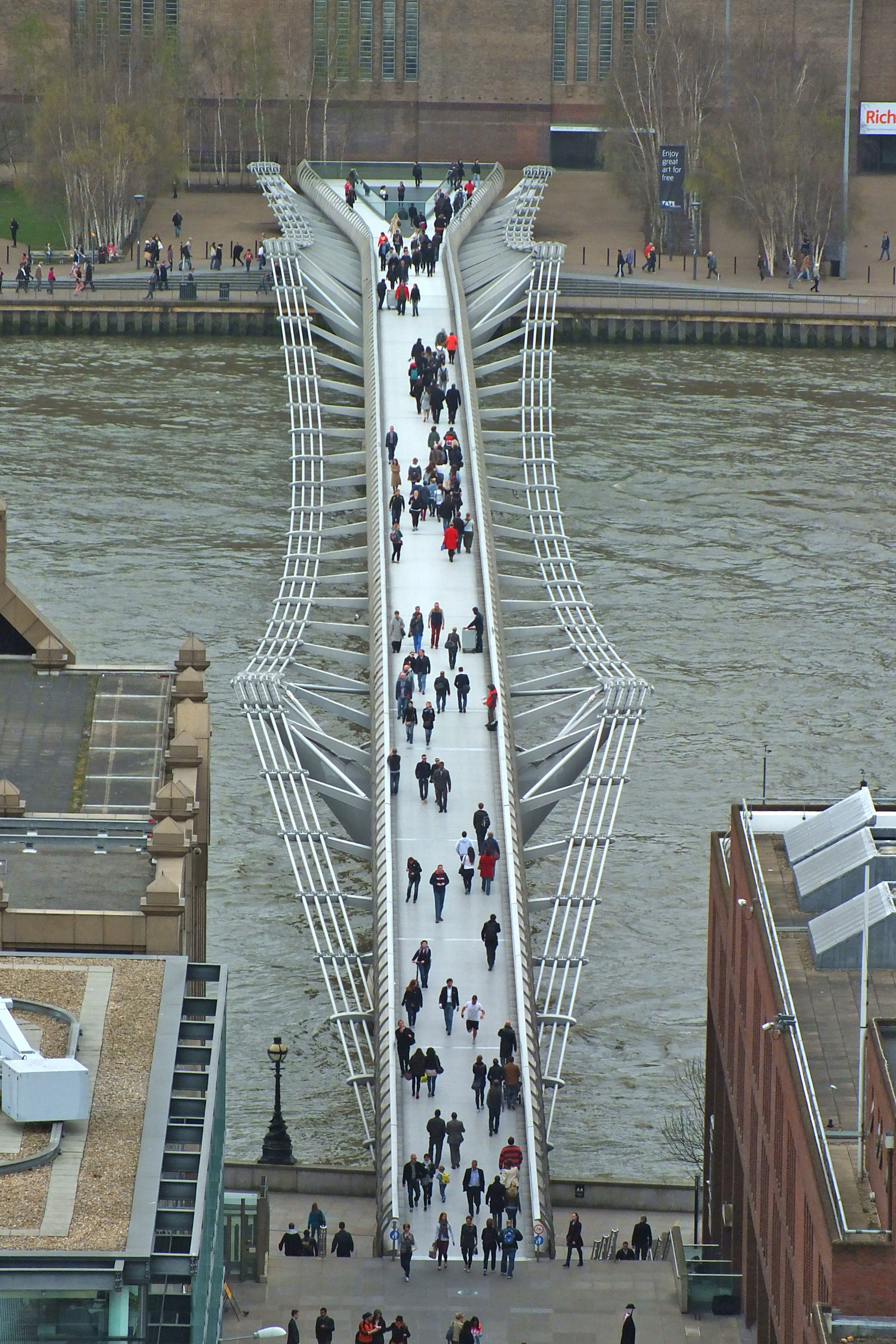
Millennium Bridge, London

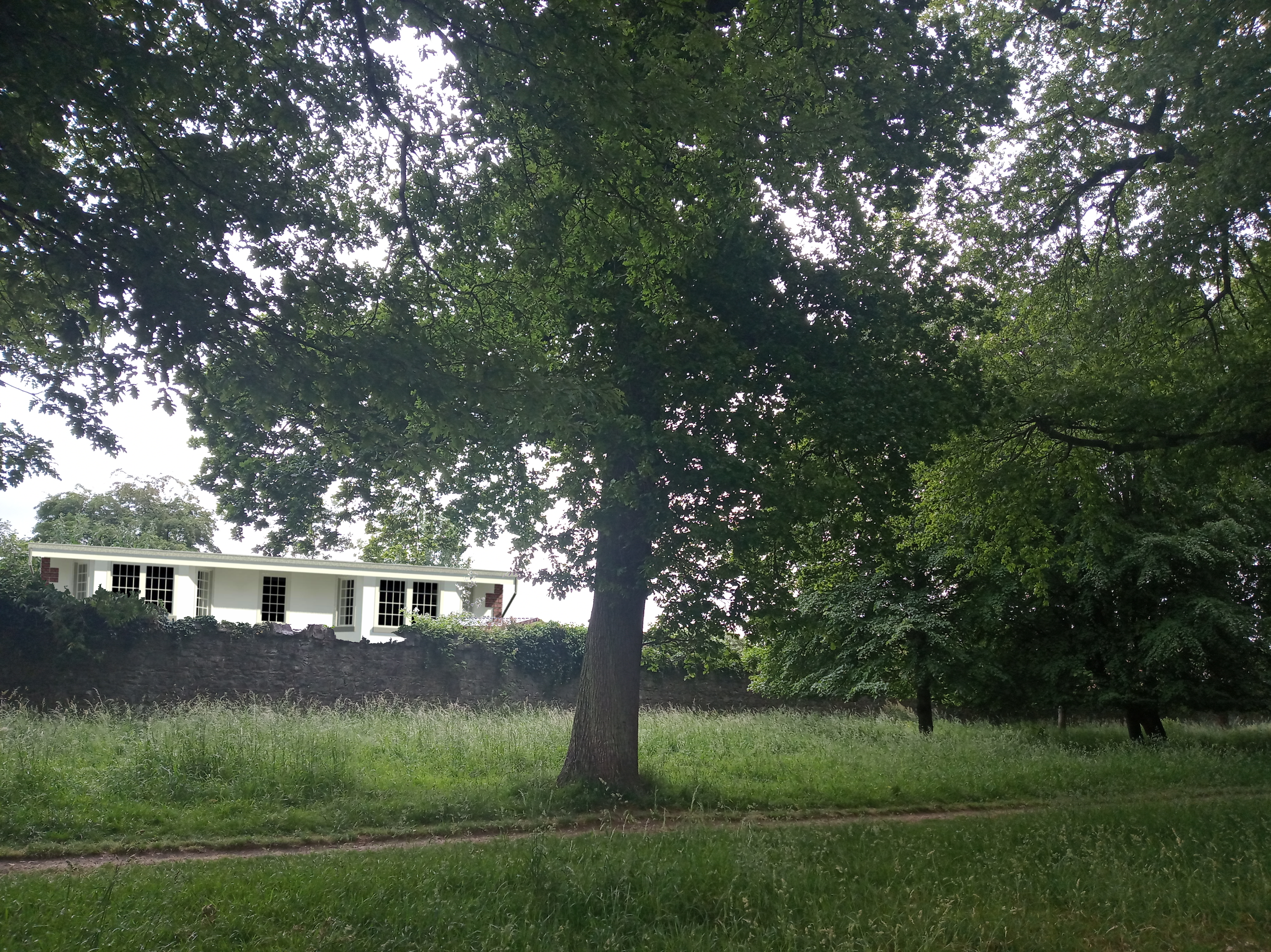
Architectural Photo-montage

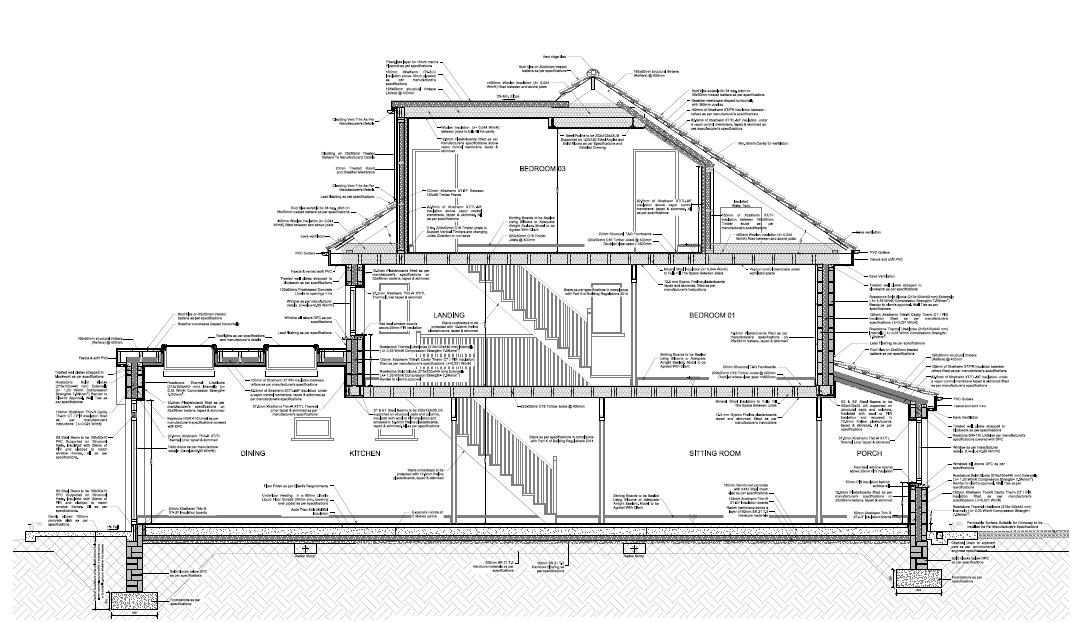
Architectural Drawing

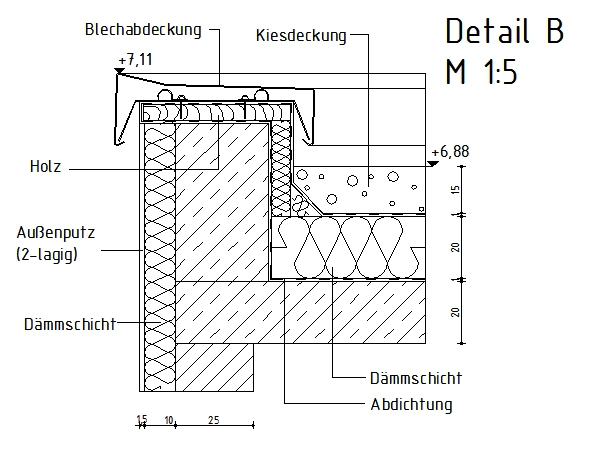
Detail Drawing

Architectural technology, or building technology, is the application of technology to the design of buildings. It is a component of architecture and building engineering and is sometimes viewed as a distinct discipline or sub-category. New materials and technologies generated new design challenges and construction methods throughout the evolution of building, especially since the advent of industrialisation in the 19th century. Architectural technology is related to the different elements of a building and their interactions; it is closely aligned with advances in building science.

Architectural technology can be summarised as the "technical design and expertise used in the application and integration of construction technologies in the building design process." or as "The ability to analyse, synthesise and evaluate building design factors in order to produce efficient and effective technical design solutions which satisfy performance, production and procurement criteria."

== History ==
Many specialists and professionals consider Vitruvius' theories as the foundations of architectural technology. Vitruvius's attempt to classify building types, styles, materials and construction methods influenced the creation of many disciplines such as civil engineering, structural engineering, architectural technology and other practices which, now and since the 19th century, form a conceptual framework for architectural design. According to Stephen Emmitt, "The relationship between building technology and design can be traced back to the Enlightenment and the industrial revolution, a period when advances in technology and science were seen as the way forward, and times of solid faith in progress... As technologies multiply in number and complexity the building profession has started to fragment."

Until the twentieth century, the materials used for building were limited to brick, stone, timber and steel to form structures, slate and tiles for roof coverings, lead and sometimes copper for waterproofing details and decorative roofing effects. The Romans used concrete, but it was virtually unknown as a building material until the invention of reinforced concrete in 1849. Modern construction is much more complex, with walls, floors and roofs all built up from many elements to include structure, insulation and waterproofing often as separate layers or elements.

== Architectural technology in practice ==
Architectural technology is a discipline that spans architecture, building science and engineering. It is informed by both practical constraints, and building regulations, as well as standards relating to safety, environmental performance, fire resistance, etc. It is practiced by architects, architectural technologists, structural engineers, architectural/building engineers and others who develop the design/concept into a buildable reality. Specialist manufacturers who develop products used to construct buildings, are also involved in the discipline.

In practice, architectural technology is developed, understood and integrated into a building by producing architectural drawings and schedules. Computer technology is now used on all but the simplest building types. During the twentieth century, the use of computer aided design (CAD) became mainstream, allowing for highly accurate drawings that can be shared electronically, so that for example the architectural plans can be used as the basis for designing electrical and air handling services. As the design develops, that information can be shared with the whole design team. That process is currently taken to a logical conclusion with Building Information Modeling (BIM), which uses a three dimensional model of the building, created with input from all the disciplines to build up an integrated design.

== See also ==
- Architect
- Architectural design
- Architectural engineering
- Architectural technologist
- Architecture
- Building control
- Building materials
- Building regulations
- Building science
- Building standards
- Chartered Institute of Architectural Technologists
- Engineering
- Environmental technologies applied to architecture
- Project Management
- Technology
