= Professional qualifications in the United Kingdom =

Professional qualifications in the United Kingdom are titles or awards granted by professional bodies. Many British professional qualifications were subject to the European directives on professional qualifications and are (following Brexit) covered by amended versions of those regulations as enacted in British law. Most, but not all, professional qualifications are 'Chartered' qualifications, and follow on from having been admitted to a degree (or having an equivalent qualification). The term "professional qualification" can also be used to refer to higher-level vocational qualifications in "professional" roles.

== Regulation and levels ==
There are four forms of regulated profession in the UK, with respect to the European directives on professional qualifications: professions regulated by law or public authority; professions regulated by professional bodies incorporated by royal charter; professions regulated under Regulation 35; and the seven sectoral professions with harmonised training requirements across the European Union. The European directives are given force of law in the UK via regulations issued by the Secretary of State under the European Communities Act 1972; the most recent regulations are The European Union (Recognition of Professional Qualifications) Regulations 2015.

The Gatsby Charitable Foundation has been supporting the development of professional qualifications for technicians, such as the Science Council's Registered Science Technician (RSciTech), the Engineering Council's Engineering Technician (EngTech) and ICT Technician (ICTTech), and the British Computer Society's Registered IT Technician (RITTech). Analysis by the Foundation identifies three levels of professional qualification on a "registration ladder" in science and engineering: technician registration, requiring Advanced Apprenticeships, A Levels, BTEC nationals, or similar awards at levels 3–4 on the Qualifications and Credit Framework (now replaced by the Regulated Qualifications Framework); intermediate qualifications such as Incorporated Engineer (IEng) and Registered Scientist (RSci) requiring Higher Apprenticeships, Higher National Diplomas, foundation degrees, bachelor's degrees, or similar awards at levels 5–6; and chartered statuses such as CEng, CSci, CPhys, CChem, etc. that require master's degrees or similar qualifications at level 7 or above.

The European directives specify five levels of professional qualification in the general system, labelled a to e and approximately defined by their required academic training as:

1. Attestation of competence
2. Education at secondary level
3. Education for at least one year at post-secondary level
4. Bachelor's degree
5. Master's degree

On this scale, ICTTech, EngTech and other technician qualifications equate to level c, IEng equates to level d, and CEng, CSci, etc. equate to level e. Although chartered statuses in science and engineering are placed at level e, in some fields chartered statuses, while remaining terminal professional qualifications in that field, are at level d (e.g. CMgr).

== Professional qualifications requiring an attestation of competence ==
These professions are government regulated and involve reserved activities rather than a reserved title. Some of these are devolved matters that are not uniformly regulated across the UK. In most cases, the competent authority for these is a government department or agency.

Generic title	Profession	Competent authority	Region
Airport fire officer / airport firefighter	Airport fire fighter	Civil Aviation Authority	UK
Diver	Diver	Health and Safety Executive, Offshore Policy Division	UK
Driving instructor	Approved driving instructor	Driver and Vehicle Standards Agency	GB
Driving instructor	Approved driving instructor department of environment for N.I.	Driver and Vehicle Testing Agency (NI)	NI
Driving instructor	Certified instructor (motor cycles) (in Great Britain)	Driver and Vehicle Standards Agency	GB
Registered Gas Engineer	Registered Gas Engineer	Capita Gas Registration and Ancillary Services Ltd	UK
Road/Street Works professions	Road/Street Works Supervisor	Street Works Qualifications Register	England & Wales
Road/Street Works professions	Road/street works operative	Street Works Qualifications Register	England & Wales
Security guard/Warden	Cash & Valuables in Transit Operative	Security Industry Authority	UK
Security guard/Warden	Close Protection Operative	Security Industry Authority	UK
Security guard/Warden	Door Supervisor	Security Industry Authority	UK
Security guard/Warden	Public Surveillance Operative	Security Industry Authority	UK
Security guard/Warden	Security Guard	Security Industry Authority	UK
Security guard/Warden	Vehicle Immobiliser (Northern Ireland)	Security Industry Authority	NI
Social worker	Childminder	Ofsted	England

== Professional qualifications requiring education at secondary level ==
These professional qualifications are mostly, as in the previous category, government regulated with reserved activities, although some are through licensing of use of a reserved title.

Professions with reserved activities:

Generic title	Profession	Competent authority	Region
Airport fire officer / airport firefighter	Airport fire officer	Civil Aviation Authority	UK
Mining electrician	Mines electrician	Health and Safety Executive	UK
Mining mechanic	Mines mechanic	Health and Safety Executive	UK

Professions with protected titles under a licensing system:

Generic title	Profession	Reserved titles	Licensing body	Region
Dental assistant/ Dental Nurse	Dental Nurse	Dental nurse, dental surgery assistant	General Dental Council	UK

== Professional qualifications requiring education for at least one year at post-secondary level ==
These qualifications now begin to include those which have protected titles without reserve of activities, normally granted by professional bodies under their royal charter rather than by statutory or regulatory bodies. Titles granted by professional bodies are often accompanied by postnominal letters.

=== Regulated by law or public authority ===
Professions with reserved activities or protected functions:

Generic title	Profession	Competent authority	Region
Boatmaster	Licensed boatmaster	Department for Transport	UK
Chief engineer class I fishing vessel	Chief engineer class 1 fishing vessel	Maritime & Coastguard Agency	UK
Chief engineer class I fishing vessel	Chief Engineer Class 2 - Fishing Vessels	Maritime & Coastguard Agency	UK
Conveyancer	Executry Practitioner	Law Society of Scotland	Scotland
Conveyancer	Qualified Conveyancer	Law Society of Scotland	Scotland
Deck officer class I fishing vessel	Deck Officer Class 1 - Fishing Vessels	Maritime & Coastguard Agency	UK
Deck officer class II fishing vessel	Deck Officer Class 2 Fishing Vessel	Maritime & Coastguard Agency	UK
Deck officer class III fishing vessel	Deck Officer Class 3 - Fishing Vessels	Maritime & Coastguard Agency	UK
Insolvency practitioner	Insolvency practitioner	Insolvency Service/Insolvency Service (NI)	UK
Inspector of weights and measures	Inspector of Weights & Measures in Northern Ireland	Department of Economic Development	NI
Inspector of weights and measures	Inspector of weights and measures	Department for Business, Energy and Industrial Strategy	GB
Lawyer/Barrister/Solicitor	Costs Lawyer	Costs Lawyer Standards Board	England & Wales
Mining engineer	Mines electrical engineer	Health and Safety Executive	UK
Mining engineer	Mines mechanical engineer	Health and Safety Executive	UK
Mining supervisor/deputy	Mine deputy	Health and Safety Executive	UK
Patent Agent / Trademark agent	Registered Trademark Attorney	Institute of Trade Mark Attorneys	UK
Patent Agent / Trademark agent	Registered trademark agent	Institute of Trade Mark Attorneys	UK
Professions in the field of waste management and disposal	Waste disposal manager (NI)	Waste Management Industry Training and Advisory Board	NI
Second level nurse	Nurse Admitted to Sub-Part 2 of the Register maintained by the Nursing & Midwifery Council	Nursing and Midwifery Council	UK
Specialised teachers, not elsewhere classified	Teacher in Further Education (England & Wales)	Wales Assembly Government/Institute for Learning	England & Wales
Veterinary nurse	Registered veterinary nurse	Royal College of Veterinary Surgeons	UK

Professions with protected titles under a licensing system:

Generic title	Profession	Reserved titles	Licensing body	Region
Dental hygienist	Dental hygienist	Dental hygienist	General Dental Council	UK
Dental technician	Clinical dental technician	Clinical dental technician, clinical dental technologist, denturist	General Dental Council	UK
Dental technician	Dental Technician	Dental technician, dental technologist	General Dental Council	UK
Dental therapist	Dental therapist	Dental therapist	General Dental Council	UK
Pharmaceutical technician/Pharmaceutical assistant	Pharmacy technician	Pharmacy technician	General Pharmaceutical Council	GB
Blacksmith, Farrier, Forging, Stamping, Pressing	Farrier	Farrier	Farriers Registration Council	UK

Professions with protected titles without reserve of activities:

Generic title	Protected title	Regulatory body	Region
Conveyancer	Licensed conveyancer	Council for Licensed Conveyancers	UK
Dental therapist	Orthodontic Therapist	General Dental Council	UK

=== Regulated by professional bodies under royal charter ===
Professions with protected titles without reserve of activities:

Generic title	Protected title	Postnominal letters	Professional body	Region
Colourist	Licentiate of the Society of Dyers and Colourists	LSDC	Society of Dyers and Colourists	UK
Dance teacher	Licentiate of the Royal Academy of Dance	LRAD	Royal Academy of Dance	UK
Dance teacher	Registered Teacher of the Royal Academy of Dance	RTRAD	Royal Academy of Dance	UK
Engineering Technician	Engineering technician	EngTech	Engineering Council	UK
Engineering Technician	ICT Technician	ICTTech	Engineering Council	UK
Marketing consultant	Associate Member of The Chartered Institute of Marketing	ACIM	Chartered Institute of Marketing	UK
Meteorologist	Registered Meteorologist	RMet	Royal Meteorological Society	UK
Surveyor	Associate Member of Royal Institution of Chartered Surveyors	ARICS	Royal Institution of Chartered Surveyors	UK
Textile expert	Licentiate of the Textile Institute	LTI	Textile Institute	UK

== Professional qualifications requiring bachelor's degree level education ==
Many of these are protected titles without reserve of activities, regulated by professional bodies acting under a royal charter. This includes a large number of chartered statuses, which are terminal professional qualifications in that field.

=== Regulated by law or public authority ===
Professions with reserved activities:

Generic title	Profession	Competent authority	Region
Actuary	Actuary	Institute and Faculty of Actuaries	UK
Headmaster/School Director	Principal of a further education institution in England	Department for Education	England
Mining manager	Mine manager	Health and Safety Executive	UK
Mining surveyor	Mine surveyor	Health and Safety Executive	UK
Nurse	Nurses admitted to Sub-Part 1 of the Register maintained by the Nursing & Midwifery Council	Nursing and Midwifery Council	UK
Patent Attorney/Trademark Attorney	Patent Attorney	Chartered Institute of Patent Attorneys	UK
Primary school teacher	School Teacher in State maintained schools (Primary)	National College for Teaching and Leadership/General Teaching Council for Scotland/General Teaching Council for Wales/General Teaching Council for Northern Ireland	Wales
Secondary school teacher	School teacher in State maintained schools (secondary)	National College for Teaching and Leadership/General Teaching Council for Scotland/General Teaching Council for Wales/General Teaching Council for Northern Ireland	UK

Professions with reserved activities and protected titles:

Generic title	Protected title	Competent authority	Region
Hearing aid dispenser	Hearing aid dispenser	Health and Care Professions Council	UK
Optician (Dispensing optician)	Dispensing optician	General Optical Council	UK

Professions with protected titles under a licensing system:

Generic title	Protected title	Licensing body	Region
Social worker	Social Worker	Care Council for Wales/Scottish Social Services Council/Northern Ireland Social Care Council	Wales, Scotland and NI

Professions with protected titles without reserve of activities:

Generic title	Protected title	Regulatory body	Region
Chiropodist (podiatrist)	Chiropodist, Podiatrist	Health and Care Professions Council	UK
Dietitian	Dietitian	Health and Care Professions Council	UK
Lawyer	Advocate/Barrister/Solicitor	Faculty of Advocates/Bar Council/Solicitors Regulation Authority	Scotland/England and Wales
Medical/Biomedical laboratory technician	Biomedical Scientist	Health and Care Professions Council	UK
Occupational therapist	Occupational therapist	Health and Care Professions Council	UK
Orthoptist	Orthoptist	Health and Care Professions Council	UK
Paramedic	Paramedic	Health and Care Professions Council	UK
Physiotherapist	Physiotherapist	Health and Care Professions Council	UK
Prosthetist/Orthotist	Prosthetist, Orthotist	Health and Care Professions Council	UK
Radiographer	Radiographer	Health and Care Professions Council	UK
Social worker	Social Worker	Social Work England	England
Speech and language therapist	Speech and language therapist, Speech therapist	Health and Care Professions Council	UK
Surgical assistant	Operating Department Practitioner	Health and Care Professions Council	UK

=== Regulated by professional bodies under royal charter ===
Professions with reserved activities and protected titles:

Generic title	Protected title	Postnominal letters	Professional body	Region
Environmental health officer	Environmental Health Practitioner	Chartered Institute of Environmental Health	MCIEH/FCIEH	UK

Professions with protected titles without reserve of activities:

Generic title	Protected title	Postnominal letters	Professional body	Region
Accountant/Tax advisor	Chartered Tax Advisor	CTA	Chartered Institute of Taxation	UK
Accountant/Tax advisor	Chartered Management Accountant	ACMA/FCMA	Chartered Institute of Management Accountants	UK
Auditor/Accountant	Chartered Certified Accountant	ACCA/FCCA	Association of Chartered Certified Accountants	UK
Auditor/Accountant	Chartered Accountant	ACA	Institute of Chartered Accountants in England and Wales/Institute of Chartered Accountants in Ireland	UK
Auditor/Accountant	Chartered Accountant	CA	Institute of Chartered Accountants of Scotland	UK
Banker	Member of the Chartered Institute of Bankers in Scotland (Chartered Banker)	MCIBS	Chartered Institute of Bankers in Scotland	GB
Banker	Fellow/Associate of the London Institute of Banking and Finance	FLIBF/ALIBF	Walbrook Institute London	UK
Biologist	Chartered Biologist	CBiol	Society of Biology	UK
Building engineer	Associate of the Chartered Institute of Building	ACIB	Chartered Institute of Building	UK
Building engineer	Chartered Builder	MCIOB	Chartered Institute of Building	UK
Building Surveyor	Chartered Building Surveyor	MRICS/FRICS	Royal Institution of Chartered Surveyors	UK
Chartered Secretary	Chartered Secretary	ACIS	Institute of Chartered Secretaries and Administrators	UK
Colourist	Associateship of Society of Dyers and Colourists	ASDC	Society of Dyers and Colourists	UK
Colourist	Chartered Colourist	CCol	Society of Dyers and Colourists	UK
Electrical and computer (technology) engineer	Member of the Institution of Engineering and Technology	MIET	Institution of Engineering and Technology	UK
Engineer	Incorporated Engineer	IEng	Engineering Council	UK
Environmental engineer	Chartered Wastes Manager	MCIWM	Chartered Institution of Wastes Management	UK
Environmental health officer	Environmental Health Officer	MCIEH/FCIEH	Chartered Institute of Environmental Health	England & Wales
Forester	Chartered Forester	MICFor/FICFor	Institute of Chartered Foresters	UK
Geographer	Chartered Geographer	CGeog	Royal Geographical Society	UK
Health and Safety Officer	Chartered Safety and Health Practitioner	CMIOSH/CFIOSH	Institution of Occupational Safety and Health	UK
Housing expert	CIH Chartered Member	CIHCM	Chartered Institute of Housing	UK
Information systems professional	Chartered IT Professional	CITP	British Computer Society	UK
Insurance and reinsurance intermediaries	Chartered Insurance Broker	ACII	Chartered Insurance Institute	UK
Insurance and reinsurance intermediaries	Chartered Insurance Practitioner	ACII	Chartered Insurance Institute	UK
Insurance underwriter	Chartered Financial Planner	AFPS	Chartered Insurance Institute	UK
Insurance underwriter	Chartered Insurer (insurance underwriting)	ACII	Chartered Insurance Institute	UK
Land Surveyor	Chartered Land Surveyor	MRICS/FRICS	Royal Institution of Chartered Surveyors	UK
Legal Executive	Chartered Legal Executive	FCILEx	Chartered Institute of Legal Executives	UK
Librarian	Chartered Institute of Library & Information Professionals	CILIP	Chartered Institute of Library and Information Professionals	UK
Loss adjuster	Chartered Loss Adjuster	ACLA	Chartered Institute of Loss Adjusters	UK
Manager (not elsewhere classified)	Chartered Manager	CMgr	Chartered Management Institute	UK
Marketing consultant	Chartered Marketer	CMktr	Chartered Institute of Marketing	UK
Marketing consultant	Member of The Chartered Institute of Marketing	MCIM	Chartered Institute of Marketing	UK
Mathematical applications expert	Chartered Mathematician	CMath	Institute of Mathematics and its Applications	UK
Mathematical applications expert	Chartered Statistician	CStat	Royal Statistical Society	UK
Measurement and control technologist	Chartered Measurement and Control Technologist	MInstMC	Institute of Measurement and Control	UK
Mechanical engineer	Chartered Mechanical Engineer -Member of the Institution of Mechanical Engineers	C.Eng, MIMechE	Institution of Mechanical Engineers	UK
Meteorologist	Chartered Meteorologist	CMet	Royal Meteorological Society	UK
Minerals surveyor	Chartered Minerals Surveyor	MRICS/FRICS	Royal Institution of Chartered Surveyors	UK
Mining and metallurgy expert	Member of the Institute of Materials Minerals and Mining	MIMMM	Institute of Materials, Minerals and Mining	UK
Public finance accountant	Chartered Public finance accountant	CPFA	Chartered Institute of Public Finance and Accountancy	UK
Quantity surveyor	Chartered Quantity Surveyor	MRICS/FRICS	Royal Institution of Chartered Surveyors	UK
Shipbroker/Shipping Agent	Chartered Shipbroker	FICS	Institute of Chartered Shipbrokers	UK
Surveyor	Chartered Surveyor	MRICS/FRICS	Royal Institution of Chartered Surveyors	UK
Textile expert	Chartered Textile Technologist	CText	Textile Institute	UK
Town planner/Town and Country Planner	Chartered Town Planner	MRTPI	Royal Town Planning Institute	UK
Valuation surveyor	Chartered Valuation Surveyor	MRICS/FRICS	Royal Institution of Chartered Surveyors	UK
Water service manager	Chartered Water and Environment Manager	MCIWEM	Chartered Institution of Water and Environmental Management	UK

== Professional qualifications requiring master's degree level education ==
=== Regulated by law or public authority ===
Professions with reserved activities and protected titles:

Generic title	Protected title	Competent authority	Region
Lawyer/Barrister/Solicitor	Barrister	General Council of the Bar	England and Wales
Lawyer/Barrister/Solicitor	Barrister	Honourable Society of the Inn of Court of Northern Ireland	Northern Ireland
Lawyer/Barrister/Solicitor	Solicitor	Law Society of England and Wales	England and Wales
Lawyer/Barrister/Solicitor	Solicitor	Law Society of Scotland	Scotland
Lawyer/Barrister/Solicitor	Solicitor	Law Society of Northern Ireland	Northern Ireland
Pharmacist	Pharmacist	General Pharmaceutical Council	Great Britain
Pharmacist	Pharmacist	Pharmaceutical Society of Northern Ireland	Northern Ireland
Optometrist (ophthalmic optician)	Optometrist (ophthalmic optician)	General Optical Council	England and Wales

Professions with protected titles without reserve of activities:

Generic title	Protected title	Regulatory body	Region
Arts therapist in the health service	Art Psychotherapist, Art Therapist, Dramatherapist, Music Therapist	Health and Care Professions Council	UK
Chiropractor	Chiropractor	General Chiropractic Council	UK
Medical physicist	Clinical Scientist	Health and Care Professions Council	UK
Osteopath	Osteopath	General Osteopathic Council	UK
Psychologist	Practitioner psychologist	Health and Care Professions Council	UK

=== Regulated by professional bodies under royal charter ===
Professions with reserved activities:

Generic title	Profession	Professional body	Region
Chemist	Analytical chemist	Royal Society of Chemistry	UK

Professions with protected titles without reserve of activities:

Generic title	Protected title	Postnominal letters	Professional body	Region
Aeronautical engineer	Member of Royal Aeronautical Society	MRAeS	Royal Aeronautical Society	UK
Architectural Technologist	Chartered Architectural Technologist	MCIAT	Chartered Institute of Architectural Technologists	UK
Building Engineer	Chartered Building Services Engineer	MCIBSE	Chartered Institution of Building Services Engineers	UK
Chemical Engineer	Chartered Chemical Engineer	MIChemE	Institution of Chemical Engineers	UK
Chemist	Chartered Chemist	CChem	Royal Society of Chemistry	UK
Civil Engineer	Chartered Civil Engineer, Member of ICE	MICE	Institution of Civil Engineers	UK
Civil Engineer	Chartered Structural Engineer	MIStructE	Institution of Structural Engineers	UK
Chartered Scientist	Chartered Scientist	CSci	Science Council	UK
Energy Engineer	Chartered Energy Engineer	MEI/FEI	Energy Institute	UK
Engineer	Chartered Engineer	CEng	Engineering Council	UK
Environmental health officer	Chartered Environmental Health Officer	Ch EHO	Royal Environmental Health Institute of Scotland	UK
Environmental health officer	Environmental Health Officer	EHO	Royal Environmental Health Institute of Scotland	UK
Gas Engineer	Chartered Gas Engineer	MIGEM	Institution of Gas Engineers and Managers	UK
Geologist	Chartered Geologist	CGeol	Geological Society	UK
Landscape architect/designer	Member of the Landscape Institute	CMLI	Landscape Institute	UK
Marine engineer	Chartered Marine Engineer	CMarEng	Institute of Marine Engineering, Science and Technology	UK
Naval architect	Member of the Royal Institution of Naval Architects	MRINA	Royal Institution of Naval Architects	England
Petroleum industry - production and processing of fuels and lubricants	Chartered Petroleum Engineer	MEI/FEI	Energy Institute	UK
Physicist	Chartered Physicist	CPhys	Institute of Physics	UK

== Professional qualifications for which the level of education is not applicable ==
=== Regulated by law or public authority ===
Professions with reserved activities:

Generic title	Profession	Competent authority	Region
Notary public	Notary Public	Master of the Faculties	England and Wales

=== Regulated by professional bodies under royal charter ===
Professions with reserved activities:

Generic title	Profession	Postnominal letters	Professional body	Region
Arbitrator	Associate of the Chartered Institute of Arbitrators	ACIArb	Chartered Institute of Arbitrators	UK

Professions with protected titles without reserve of activities:

Generic title	Protected title	Postnominal letters	Professional or regulatory body	Region
Arbitrator	Member of the Chartered Institute of Arbitrators	MCIArb	Chartered Institute of Arbitrators	UK
Arbitrator	Chartered Arbitrator	FCIArb	Chartered Institute of Arbitrators	UK

== Professional qualifications in sectoral professions ==
The "sectoral professions" are ones which are regulated in every EU country and where training and education requirements have been harmonised. There is therefore no explicit training level associated with the qualifications in the regulations as the educational requirements do not vary between countries and do not need to be compared. All of these are regulated by law or public authority, not by professional bodies.

Profession	Competent authority	Region
Architect	Architects Registration Board	UK
Dental Practitioner	General Dental Council	UK
Doctor with basic training	General Medical Council	UK
Doctor: Specialist doctor	General Medical Council	UK
Doctor: General Practitioner	General Medical Council	UK
Nurse and midwife	Nursing and Midwifery Council	UK
Pharmacist	General Pharmaceutical Council	GB
Pharmacist	Pharmaceutical Society of Northern Ireland	NI
Veterinary Surgeon	Royal College of Veterinary Surgeons	UK

== Professional qualifications not included in the European directives ==
Not all chartered titles are included in the European directives on professional qualifications, but all UK chartered titles, and some lower-level titles, are issued by a professional body under the authority of a royal charter and are thus recognised professional qualifications (these should not be confused with membership levels within an organisation). These qualifications are sometimes associated with professions that are included in the directives as regulated under law or by public authority (e.g. architecture or psychology).

Non-chartered titles:

Professional	Postnominal letters	Professional body
Registered Environmental Technician	REnvTech	Society for the Environment
Registered IT Technician	RITTech	British Computer Society
Registered Science Technician	RSciTech	Science Council
Registered Scientist	RSci	Science Council
Registered Marine Technologist	RMarTech	IMarEST

Chartered titles:

Professional	Postnominal letters	Professional body
Chartered Arboriculturalist	MICFor	Institute of Chartered Foresters
Chartered Architect	RIBA	Royal Institute of British Architects
Chartered Designer	MCSD & FCSD	Chartered Society of Designers
Chartered Director	CDir	Institute of Directors
Chartered Environmentalist	CEnv	Society for the Environment
Chartered Ergonomist and Human Factors Specialist	CErgHF	Chartered Institute of Ergonomics and Human Factors
Chartered Horticulturist	CHort	Chartered Institute of Horticulture
Chartered Internal Auditor	CMIIA/CFIIA	Chartered Institute of Internal Auditors
Chartered Linguist	CL	Chartered Institute of Linguists
Chartered Mathematics Teacher	CMathTeach	Institute of Mathematics and its Applications
Chartered Member/Fellow of the Chartered Institute of Professional Development	Chartered MCIPD/Chartered FCIPD	Chartered Institute of Professional Development
Chartered Member/Fellow of the Chartered Institute for Securities and Investment	Chartered MCISI/Chartered FCISI	Chartered Institute for Securities and Investment
Chartered Member/Fellow of the Institute of Logistics and Transport	CMILT/FCILT	Chartered Institute of Logistics and Transport
Chartered Patent Attorney/Agent	CPA	Chartered Institute of Patent Attorneys
Chartered Physiotherapist	MCSP	Chartered Society of Physiotherapy
Chartered Procurement and Supply Professional	MCIPS/FCIPS	Chartered Institute of Procurement & Supply
Chartered Psychologist	CPsychol	British Psychological Society
Chartered Public Relations Practitioner	Chart.PR	Chartered Institute of Public Relations
Chartered Quality Professionals	CQP	Chartered Quality Institute
Chartered Radiation Protection Professional	CRadP	Society for Radiological Protection
Chartered Science Teacher	CSciTeach	Science Council
Chartered Security Professional	CSyP	Chartered Security Professionals Registration Authority
Chartered Teacher of English	CTE	English Association
Chartered Wealth Manager	Chartered MCISI/Chartered FCISI	Chartered Institute for Securities and Investment
