= List of professional associations in the United Kingdom =

The following is a list of notable professional bodies in the United Kingdom. Many of these bodies also act as learned societies for the academic disciplines underlying their professions. The UK government has a list of professional associations approved for tax purposes (this includes some non-UK-based associations, which are not included here). There is a separate list of regulators in the United Kingdom for bodies that are regulators rather than professional associations.

== Chartered ==
The following professional bodies are incorporated by royal charter:

=== A–B ===
- Association of Chartered Certified Accountants (ACCA)
- Association of Corporate Treasurers (ACT)
- Association for Project Management (APM)
- Association for Science Education (ASE)
- British Computer Society (BCS)
- British Psychological Society (BPS)
- British Society of Gastroenterology (BSG)

=== C–D ===
- Chartered Institute of Management Accountants (CIMA)
- Chartered Association of Building Engineers (CABE)
- Chartered Governance Institute (CGI)
- Chartered Institute for Archaeologists (CIFA)
- Chartered Institute for Securities and Investment (CISI)
- Chartered Institute of Arbitrators (CIArb)
- Chartered Institute of Architectural Technologists (CIAT)
- Chartered Banker Institute
- Chartered Institute of Brewers & Distillers (CIBD)
- Chartered Institute of Building (CIOB)
- Chartered Institute of Credit Management (CICM)
- Chartered Institute of Ecology and Environmental Management (CIEEM)
- Chartered Institute of Environmental Health (CIEH)
- Chartered Institute of Fundraising (CIof)
- Chartered Institute of Horticulture (CIoH)
- Chartered Institute of Housing (CIH)
- Chartered Institute of Internal Auditors (IIA)
- Chartered Institute of Journalists
- Chartered Institute of Legal Executives (CILEX)
- Chartered Institute of Library and Information Professionals (CILIP)
- Chartered Institute of Linguists (CIOL)
- Chartered Institute of Logistics and Transport (CILT)
- Chartered Institute of Loss Adjusters (CILA)
- Chartered Institute of Marketing (CIM)
- Chartered Institute for the Management of Sport and Physical Activity (CIMSPA)
- Chartered Institute of Patent Attorneys (CIPA)
- Chartered Institute of Payroll Professionals (CIPP)
- Chartered Institute of Personnel and Development (CIPD)
- Chartered Institute of Plumbing and Heating Engineering (CIPHE)
- Chartered Institute of Procurement & Supply (CIPS)
- Chartered Institute of Public Finance and Accountancy (CIPFA)
- Chartered Institute of Public Relations (CIPR)
- Chartered Institution of Railway Operators (CIRO)
- Chartered Institute of Taxation (CIOT)
- Chartered Institute of Trade Mark Attorneys (CITMA)
- Chartered Institution of Building Services Engineers (CIBSE)
- Chartered Institution of Civil Engineering Surveyors (CICES)
- Chartered Institution of Highways and Transportation (CIHT)
- Chartered Institution of Wastes Management (CIWM)
- Chartered Institution of Water and Environmental Management (CIWEM)
- Chartered Insurance Institute (CII)
- Chartered Management Institute (CMI)
- Chartered Quality Institute (CQI)
- Chartered Society of Designers (CSD)
- Chartered Society of Physiotherapy (CSP)
- Chartered Trading Standards Institute (CTSI)
- College of Optometrists (CoO)
- College of Paramedics (CoP)
- The Chartered College of Teaching (CCT)

=== E–H ===
- Energy Institute (EI)
- English Association (EA)
- Geological Society of London

=== I–J ===
- Institute and Faculty of Actuaries (IFoA)
- Institute of Chartered Accountants in England & Wales (ICAEW)
- Institute of Chartered Accountants in Ireland (ICAI, operates in Northern Ireland)
- Institute of Chartered Accountants of Scotland (ICAS)
- Institute of Chartered Foresters (ICF)
- Institute of Chartered Shipbrokers (ICS)
- Institute of Conservation (Icon)
- Institute of Directors (IoD)
- Institute of Health and Social Care Management (IHSCM)
- Institute of Marine Engineering, Science and Technology (IMarEST)
- Institute of Materials, Minerals and Mining (IOM3)
- Institute of Mathematics and its Applications (IMA)
- Institute of Measurement and Control (InstMC)
- Institute of Physics (IoP)
- Institute of Practitioners in Advertising (IPA)
- Institute of Refrigeration (InstR)
- Institution of Chemical Engineers (IChemE)
- Institution of Civil Engineers (ICE)
- Institution of Engineering and Technology (IET)
- Institution of Engineering Designers (IED)
- Institution of Mechanical Engineers (IMechE)
- Institution of Occupational Safety and Health (IOSH)
- Institution of Royal Engineers (InstRE)
- Institution of Structural Engineers (IStructE)

=== K–P ===
- Landscape Institute (LI)
- The Law Society (LS)
- Law Society of Northern Ireland
- Linnean Society of London (LS)

=== Q–Z ===
- Royal Aeronautical Society (RAeS)
- Royal Agricultural Society of England (RASE)
- Royal Anthropological Institute (RAI)
- Royal Asiatic Society (RAS)
- Royal Astronomical Society (RAS)
- Royal College of Anaesthetists
- Royal College of General Practitioners (RCGP)
- Royal College of Nursing (RCN)
- Royal College of Obstetricians and Gynaecologists (RCOG)
- Royal College of Organists (RCO)
- Royal College of Paediatrics and Child Health (RCPCH)
- Royal College of Physicians and Surgeons of Glasgow
- Royal College of Physicians of Edinburgh
- Royal College of Physicians of London
- Royal College of Psychiatrists
- Royal College of Radiologists (RCR)
- Royal College of Speech and Language Therapists (RCSLT)
- Royal College of Surgeons of England
- Royal College of Surgeons of Edinburgh
- Royal College of Veterinary Surgeons (RCVS)
- Royal Economic Society (RES)
- Royal Geographical Society (RGS-IBG)
- Royal Historical Society (RHS)
- Royal Incorporation of Architects in Scotland (RIAS)
- Royal Institute of British Architects (RIBA)
- Royal Institute of Navigation (RIN)
- Royal Institution of Chartered Surveyors (RICS)
- Royal Institution of Naval Architects (RINA)
- Royal Meteorological Society (RMetS)
- Royal Microscopical Society (RMS)
- Royal Pharmaceutical Society (RPS)
- Royal Photographic Society (RPS)
- Royal Society for Public Health (RSPH)
- Royal Society of Biology (RSB)
- Royal Society of Chemistry (RSC)
- Royal Society of Medicine (RSM)
- Royal Statistical Society (RSS)
- Royal Town Planning Institute (RTPI)
- Society for Radiological Protection (SRP)
- Society of Dyers and Colourists (SDC)
- The Textile Institute (TEXI)
- UK Cyber Security Council (UK CSC, CSP)

== Non-chartered ==
=== A ===
- The Academy of Experts (TAE)
- Arboricultural Association (AA)
- Archives and Records Association (ARA)
- Association for the Education and Guardianship of International Students (AEGIS)
- Association of Accounting Technicians (AAT)
- Association of British Theatre Technicians (ABTT)
- Association of Chief Executives of Voluntary Organisations (ACEVO)
- Association of Taxation Technicians (ATT)
- Association of University Administrators (AUA)

=== B–G ===
- British and International Golf Greenkeepers Association (BIGGA)
- British Association for Counselling and Psychotherapy (BACP)
- British Association of Social Workers (BASW)
- British Guild of Travel Writers (BGTW)
- British Occupational Hygiene Society (BOHS)
- Institute of Osteopathy (BOA)
- British Pest Control Association (BPCA)
- College of Paramedics (CoP)
- Direct Marketing Association (DMA)
- Faculty of Advocates
- Freshwater Biological Association (FBA)
- General Council of the Bar (Bar Council)

=== H–I ===
- Immigration Law Practitioners Association (ILPA)
- Independent Society of Musicians (ISM)
- Information and Records Management Society (IRMS)
- The Inns of Court, comprising Gray's Inn, Lincoln's Inn, Inner Temple, and Middle Temple
- Insolvency Practitioners Association (IPA)
- Institute for the Management of Information Systems (IMIS)
- Institute of Acoustics
- Institute of Administrative Management (IAM)
- Institute of Biomedical Science (IBMS)
- Institute of Certified Bookkeepers (ICB)
- Institute of Commercial Management (ICM)
- Institute of Corporate Responsibility and Sustainability (ICRS)
- Institute of Economic Development (IED)
- Institute of Environmental Management and Assessment (IEMA)
- Institute of Employability Professionals (IEP)
- Institute of Financial Accountants (IFA)
- Institute of Fisheries Management (IFM)
- Institute of Food Science and Technology (IFST)
- Institute of Groundsmanship (IOG)
- Institute of Information Security Professionals (IISP)
- Institute of Leadership (IoL)
- Institute of Professional Sound (IPS)
- Institute of Science and Technology (IST)
- Institute of Scientific and Technical Communicators (ISTC)
- Institute of Tourist Guiding (ITG)
- Institute of Transport Administration (IoTA)
- Institute of Water (IWater)
- Institute of Workplace and Facilities Management (IWFM)
- Institution of Agricultural Engineers (IAgrE)
- Institution of Analysts and Programmers (IAP)
- Institution of Environmental Sciences (IES)
- Institution of Fire Engineers (IFE)
- Institution of Railway Signal Engineers (IRSE)
- International Association of Hydrogeologists (IAH)
- International Institute of Risk and Safety Management (IIRSM)
- International Society of Typographic Designers (ISTD)
- Institute of Financial Accountants (IFA)

=== J–Z ===
- London Institute of Banking & Finance (LIBF)
- Museums Association (MA)
- Nuclear Institute (NI)
- Operational Research Society (ORS)
- Palaeontological Association (PalAss)
- Professional Publishers Association (PPA)
- Royal Society of Ulster Architects (RSUA)
- Security Institute (SyI)
- Society of British and International Interior Design (SBID)
- Society of Indexers (SI)
- Society and College of Radiographers (SCoR)
- Society of Trust and Estate Practitioners (STEP)
- United Kingdom Council for Psychotherapy (UKCP)

== See also ==
- List of organisations in the United Kingdom with a royal charter
- List of regulators in the United Kingdom
- Livery company
