= List of organisations in the United Kingdom with a royal charter =

List of organisations in the United Kingdom with a royal charter is an incomplete list of organisations based in the United Kingdom that have received a royal charter from an English, Scottish, or British monarch.

There are over 900 bodies which have a UK royal charter. and a list of these is published by the Privy Council Office.

Organisations are listed with the year(s) the charter was granted. This may not be the same as the year the organisation was founded. Organisations may also have charters renewed or regranted, so multiple dates may be shown.

== Alphabetical list ==
=== A ===
- Aberystwyth University (1889)
- Air Training Corps
- Arts Council England
- Association of Chartered Certified Accountants
- Association of Corporate Treasurers
- Association for Project Management
- Aston University (1966)

=== B ===
- Ballyclare May Fair (1756)
- Bank of England
- Bangor University (1885)
- Bath Royal Literary and Scientific Institution
- BBC (1927, 1937, 1947, 1952, 1964, 1981, 1997, 2007, 2017)
- Belfast Royal Academy
- Bridewell Royal Hospital alias King Edward's School, Witley
- Bridge House Estates (1282)
- British and Foreign Bible Society
- British Army
- British Computer Society (1984)
- British Film Institute (1983)
- British Institute of Radiology
- British Occupational Hygiene Society
- British Psychological Society
- British Standards Institution
- British Red Cross (1908)
- Bristol Society of Merchant Venturers

=== C ===
- Cardiff University (1884)
- Carnegie Trust for the Universities of Scotland (1902, revised 1978)
- Carnegie United Kingdom Trust (1917)
- Chamber of Shipping
- Chartered Association of Building Engineers (CABE)
- Chartered Institute of Arbitrators
- Chartered Institute for Securities & Investment
- Chartered Institute of Bankers in Scotland
- Chartered Institute of Building
- Chartered Institute of Editing and Proofreading
- Chartered Institute of Environmental Health
- The Chartered Institute of Ergonomics and Human Factors
- Chartered Institute of Fundraising
- Chartered Institute of Housing
- Chartered Institute of Internal Auditors
- Chartered Institute of Legal Executives
- Chartered Institute of Library and Information Professionals
- Chartered Institute of Linguists
- Chartered Institute of Logistics and Transport
- Chartered Institute of Loss Adjusters
- Chartered Institute of Management Accountants
- Chartered Institute for the Management of Sport and Physical Activity (2011/2012)
- Chartered Institute of Marketing
- Chartered Institute of Patent Attorneys
- Chartered Institute of Personnel and Development
- Chartered Institute of Plumbing and Heating Engineering
- Chartered Institute of Procurement & Supply
- Chartered Institute of Public Finance and Accountancy
- Chartered Institute of Public Relations
- Chartered Institute of Securities and Investment
- Chartered Institute of Taxation
- Chartered Institute of Trade Mark Attorneys
- Chartered Institute of Wastes Management
- Chartered Institution of Water and Environmental Management
- Chartered Institution of Building Services Engineers (CIBSE) (2003)
- Chartered Institution of Civil Engineering Surveyors (CICES)
- Chartered Institution of Railway Operators
- Chartered Insurance Institute
- Chartered Management Institute
- Chartered Quality Institute
- Chartered Society of Designers
- Chartered Society of Physiotherapy (1920)
- Chartered Trading Standards Institute
- Christ College, Brecon
- Christ's Hospital
- City and Guilds of London Institute
- City, University of London
- Clifton College
- Colchester Royal Grammar School
- College of Arms
- College of Emergency Medicine
- College of Optometrists
- Confederation of British Industry
- Crafts Council
- Cranfield University

=== D ===
- Duchy of Cornwall (1337)

=== E ===
- Edinburgh Napier University
- Edinburgh Royal Choral Union
- Educational Institute of Scotland
- Engineering Council
- English Speaking Union
- English Sports Council

=== F ===
- Faculty of Actuaries
- French Protestant Church of London (1550)
- FRDP International

=== G ===
- Geological Society
- Goldsmiths College

=== H ===
- Heriot-Watt University
- Heythrop College, University of London
- Highgate School (1565)
- High School of Dundee (1859)
- Historic Royal Palaces (1998)
- The Honourable Company of Air Pilots
- Homerton College, University of Cambridge

=== I ===
- Ifs School of Finance
- Imperial College London (1907)
- Institute and Faculty of Actuaries
- Institute of Chartered Accountants in England and Wales
- Institute of Chartered Accountants in Ireland (1888)
- Institute of Chartered Accountants of Scotland (1854)
- Institute of Chartered Foresters
- Institute of Chartered Secretaries and Administrators
- Institute of Chartered Shipbrokers
- Institution of Engineers (India)
- Institute of Directors
- Institute of Mathematics and its Applications (1990)
- Institute of Physics
- Institution of Chemical Engineers
- Institution of Civil Engineers
- Institution of Engineering and Technology; formerly:
  - Institution of Electrical Engineers
  - Institution of Incorporated Engineers
- Institution of Engineering Designers
- Institute of Marine Engineering, Science and Technology
- Institution of Mechanical Engineers
- Institution of Occupational Safety and Health (2003)
- Institution of Royal Engineers
- Institution of Structural Engineers
- Ipswich School (1566)

=== J ===
- The Jockey Club

=== K ===
- Keele University (1962)
- Khalsa Aid (1999)
- King James's School, Almondbury (1608)
- King's Ely (1541)
- King's College London (1829)
- King Edward VII's Hospital for Officers (1930)

=== L ===
- Lancaster University (1964)
- Landscape Institute (2008)
- Law Society (1845)
- Legal Education Foundation (1975), formerly the College of Law
- Liverpool John Moores University
- London Library (1933, 1968, 2004)
- London Mathematical Society (1965)
- Loughborough University (1966)

=== M ===
- The Marine Society
- Museums and Galleries Commission (1987)
- Maidstone Grammar School
- Marylebone Cricket Club (2012)

=== N ===
- National Churches Trust
- National Society for the Prevention of Cruelty to Children (NSPCC) (1895)
- National Rifle Association (1894)
- North of England Institute of Mining and Mechanical Engineers (1876)
- Norwich School (1547)
- National Citizen Service (2017)

=== O ===
- The Open University (1969)
- The Officers' Association (1921)

=== P ===
- P&O (1840)
- Police Roll of Honour Trust (2018)
- Portora Royal School
- The Prince's Trust

=== Q ===
- Queen's University of Belfast (1908)
- Queen Mary and Westfield College, University of London

=== R ===
- Recognition Panel
- Rossall School
- Royal Academy
- Royal Academy of Dance
- Royal Academy of Dramatic Art
- Royal Academy of Engineering
- Royal Academy of Music
- Royal Aero Club
- Royal Aeronautical Society
- Royal African Society
- Royal Agricultural University
- Royal Agricultural Society of England
- Royal Aircraft Establishment
- Royal Air Force
- The Royal and Ancient Golf Club of St Andrews
- Royal Armouries
- Royal Asiatic Society
- Royal Association for Deaf people
- Royal Association for Disability and Rehabilitation
- Royal Association of British Dairy Farmers
- Royal Astronomical Society
- Royal Astronomical Society of Canada
- Royal Australasian College of Surgeons
- Royal Automobile Club
- Royal Ballet
- Royal Bank of Scotland
- Royal Bath and West of England Society
- Royal Belfast Academical Institution
- Royal Belfast Golf Club
- Royal Birmingham Society of Artists
- Royal Botanic Garden Edinburgh
- Royal Botanic Gardens, Kew
- Royal British Nurses' Association
- Royal British Society of Sculptors
- Royal Caledonian Curling Club
- Royal Central School of Speech and Drama
- Royal Chester Rowing Club
- Royal Choral Society
- Royal College of Anaesthetists
- Royal College of Art
- Royal College of Emergency Medicine
- Royal College of General Practitioners
- Royal College of Midwives
- Royal College of Music
- Royal College of Nursing
- Royal College of Obstetricians and Gynaecologists
- Royal College of Ophthalmologists
- Royal College of Organists
- Royal College of Pathologists
- Royal College of Paediatrics and Child Health
- Royal College of Physicians and Surgeons of Glasgow
- Royal College of Physicians of Edinburgh
- Royal College of Physicians of London
- Royal College of Psychiatrists
- Royal College of Radiologists
- Royal College of Science
- Royal College of Surgeons of Edinburgh
- Royal College of Surgeons of England
- Royal College of Surgeons in Ireland
- Royal College of Veterinary Surgeons
- Royal Commonwealth Society
- Royal Commonwealth Society for the Blind
- Royal Cornhill Hospital
- Royal (Dick) School of Veterinary Studies
- Royal Economic Society
- Royal Engineers
- Royal Entomological Society
- Royal Free Hospital
- Royal Fleet Auxiliary
- Royal Flying Corps
- Royal Forestry Society
- Royal Geographical Society (1859)
- Royal Grammar School, Guildford
- Royal Grammar School, High Wycombe
- Royal Greenwich Observatory
- Royal Harbour, Ramsgate
- Royal Hibernian Military School
- Royal High School, Edinburgh
- Royal Highland and Agricultural Society of Scotland
- Royal Historical Society
- Royal Holloway, University of London
- Royal Horticultural Society
- Royal Hospital, Chelsea (by Royal Warrant)
- Royal Hospital, Greenwich
- Royal Hospital School
- Royal Institute of British Architects (RIBA)
- Royal Institution of Chartered Surveyors
- Royal Institute of International Affairs (Chatham House)
- Royal Institution of Great Britain (1800)
- Royal Institution of Naval Architects
- Royal Life Saving Society
- Royal Liverpool Philharmonic Orchestra
- Royal Liverpool Seamen's Orphan Institution
- Royal London Society for the Blind
- Royal Marines
- Royal Medical Society of Edinburgh
- Royal Mencap Society
- Royal Meteorological Society
- Royal Microscopical Society
- Royal Military Academy Sandhurst
- Royal Mint
- Royal National Institute of the Blind
- Royal National Institute of the Deaf
- Royal National Lifeboat Institution
- Royal National Mòd
- Royal Navy
- Royal Northern College of Music
- Royal Numismatic Society
- Royal Observatory, Edinburgh
- Royal Opera House
- Royal Ordnance
- Royal Over-Seas League
- Royal Pharmaceutical Society of Great Britain
- Royal Philharmonic Orchestra
- Royal Photographic Society
- Royal Radar Establishment
- Royal Regiment of Artillery
- The Royal School, Armagh
- Royal School Dungannon
- Royal School of Church Music
- Royal School of Military Engineering
- Royal School of Needlework
- Royal Scottish Academy
- Royal Scottish Forestry Society
- Royal Scottish National Orchestra
- Royal Scottish Geographical Society
- Royal Scottish Society of Arts
- Royal Scottish Society of Painters in Watercolour
- Royal Shakespeare Company
- The Royal Society
- Royal Society of Antiquaries of Ireland
- Royal Society of Architects for Wales
- Royal Society of Arts
- Royal Society for Asian Affairs (RSAA)
- Royal Society of British Organists
- Royal Society of Chemistry
- Royal Society of Edinburgh
- Royal Society of Literature
- Royal Society of London
- Royal Society of Marine Artists
- Royal Society of Medicine
- Royal Society of Miniature Painters Sculptors and Gravers
- Royal Society of Portrait Painters
- Royal Society of Wildlife Trusts
- Royal Society for Public Health (RSPH)
- Royal Society for the Prevention of Accidents (RoSPA)
- Royal Society for the Protection of Birds (RSPB)
- Royal Society for the Promotion of Health
- The Royal Society of St George (1963)
- Royal Society of Tropical Medicine and Hygiene
- Royal Society of Ulster Architects
- Royal Star and Garter Home for Disabled Sailors, Soldiers and Airmen
- Royal Statistical Society (1887)
- Royal Town Planning Institute (1959)
- Royal Television Society
- Royal Veterinary College
- Royal Victoria Hospital, Belfast
- Royal Welch Fusiliers
- Royal Welsh College of Music and Drama
- Royal West of England Academy
- Royal Ulster Agricultural Society
- Royal Yachting Association
- Royal Yacht Squadron
- Royal Zoological Society of Scotland

=== S ===
- Science Council (2003)
- Science and Technology Facilities Council
- The Scout Association
- SOAS, University of London
- Society for the Environment
- Society for Radiological Protection
- Society of Advocates in Aberdeen
- Society of Chemical Industry
- Society of Dyers and Colourists (1962)
- Society of Licensed Victuallers (1836)
- Spalding Queen Elizabeth Royal Free Grammar School
- St. Andrew's Ambulance Association (1899)
- St Chad's College Durham (1904)
- St Edmund's College, Cambridge (1998)
- St Peter's College, Oxford (1961)
- St Peter's School, York
- Standard Chartered Bank (1853)
- Sunnyside Royal Hospital

=== T ===
- Technology Strategy Board
- The Textile Institute
- Toc H
- The Tanners Company of Bermondsey
- Trustee Savings Bank

=== U ===
- Universities' China Committee in London (1932)
- University College London
- University of Aberdeen
- University of Bath (1966)
- University of Birmingham (1900)
- University of Bradford (1966)
- University of Bristol (1909)
- University of Buckingham (1983)
- University of Cambridge (1231)
- University of Durham (1837)
- University of Dundee (1967)
- University of Edinburgh (1582)
- University of Essex
- University of Exeter
- University of Glasgow (1451)
- University of Hull
- University of Keele
- University of Kent
- University of Leeds
- University of Leicester (1957)
- University of Liverpool
- University of London
- University of Manchester
- University of Nottingham
- University of Oxford (1248)
- University of Reading
- University of Salford
- University of Sheffield
- University of Southampton (1952)
- University of St Andrews
- University of Stirling
- University of Strathclyde
- University of Surrey
- University of Sussex
- University of Ulster
- University of Wales Swansea
- University of Wales: Trinity Saint David
- University of Warwick (1965)
- University of West of Scotland (2007)
- University of York (1963)

=== V ===
- Venerable Order of Saint John (1888)

=== W ===
- Wellington College
- West India Committee
- Wilson's School
- Worshipful Company of Basketmakers
- Worshipful Company of Chartered Secretaries and Administrators
- Worshipful Company of Curriers
- Worshipful Company of Firefighters (2013)
- Worshipful Company of Glass Sellers (1664)
- Worshipful Company of Haberdashers
- Worshipful Company of Information Technologists (2010)
- Worshipful Company of Joiners and Ceilers
- Worshipful Company of Mercers
- Worshipful Company of Scriveners
- Worshipful Society of Apothecaries (1617)

== See also ==
- List of Canadian organizations with royal patronage
- List of organisations based in the Republic of Ireland with royal patronage
- List of professional associations in the United Kingdom
