= Chartered Environmentalist =

UK professional qualification

A Chartered Environmentalist (CEnv) is a professional qualification in the United Kingdom that is awarded by the Society for the Environment through its 24 licensed member organisations (listed below).

Chartered Environmentalists do not come from a single sector. Over the years, over 7,000 professionals have registered as Chartered Environmentalists.

== Licensed Member Bodies ==
- Arboricultural Association (AA)
- Chartered Association of Building Engineers (CABE)
- Chartered Institute of Architectural Technologists (CIAT)
- Chartered Institute of Building (CIOB)
- Chartered Institute of Ecology and Environmental Management (CIEEM)
- Chartered Institution of Wastes Management (CIWM)
- Chartered Institution of Water and Environmental Management (CIWEM)
- Energy Institute (EI)
- Institute of Agricultural Managers (IAgrM)
- Institute of Chartered Foresters (ICF)
- Institution of Engineering Designers (IED)
- Institute of Environmental Management and Assessment (IEMA)
- Institute of Fisheries Management (IFM)
- Institute of Materials, Minerals and Mining (IOM3)
- Institution of Agricultural Engineers (IAgrE)
- Institution of Chemical Engineers (IChemE)
- Institution of Civil Engineers (ICE)
- Institution of Environmental Sciences (IES)
- Institution of Mechanical Engineers (IMechE)
- Institute of Water (IWater)
- Royal Institution of Chartered Surveyors (RICS)
- Royal Society of Chemistry (RSC)
- Society of Environmental Engineers (SEE)
- Society of Operations Engineers (SOE)

== See also ==
- Chartered Engineer
- Chartered Scientist
