= Society for the Environment =

The Society for the Environment (SocEnv) is an umbrella body for environmental organisations in the UK. Its primary function is the licensing of its member institutions to confer chartered status on sustainability and environmental professionals worldwide. It was established in response to the need to encourage the highest levels of professionalism in the field of sustainability.

The Society aspires to be the co-ordinating body for professionals working in sustainability and environmental matters and a pre-eminent champion of a sustainable environment. The Society aims to achieve this by nurturing and harnessing the combined resources, knowledge, and achievements of the professional and learned bodies which are its members.

"The Society for the Environment has a key role to play in co-ordinating and representing the views of the environmental professions on how best to meet the challenges of climate change, and of development within environmental limits" - Jonathon Porritt, former chair of the Sustainable Development Commission and notable environmentalist.

Each of the member institutions retains its unique identity and remain a centre of excellence within its field. SocEnv attained Royal Chartered status on 6 May 2004 and issued the first licenses to enable the award of Chartered Environmentalist in September 2004.

== Becoming a Chartered Environmentalist ==
To become a Chartered Environmentalist an individual must be a member of one of the Member Institutions and demonstrate (through qualifications and experience) competence, knowledge and engagement in sustainable environmental management and development.

== The Constituent Bodies ==
The constituent and associate bodies represent over 400,000 environmental practitioners drawn from a wide range of professions, each with a track record of pre-eminence in its particular field and of particular achievements. The Society provides an independent forum for debate. Where there is no consensus, it will publish a range of views. The society actively promotes innovation and inspiration in tackling the environmental problems that exist across the globe.

The current constituent bodies are:

- Arboricultural Association (AA)
- Chartered Association of Building Engineers (CABE)
- Chartered Institute of Architectural Technologists (CIAT)
- Chartered Institute of Building (CIOB)
- Chartered Institute of Ecology and Environmental Management (CIEEM)
- Chartered Institution of Wastes Management (CIWM)
- Chartered Institution of Water and Environmental Management (CIWEM)
- Energy Institute (EI)
- Institute of Agricultural Management (IAgrM)
- Institute of Chartered Foresters (ICF)
- Institute of Environmental Management and Assessment (IEMA)
- Institute of Fisheries Management (IFM)
- Institute of Materials, Minerals & Mining (IOM3)
- Institute of Water (IWater)
- Institution of Agricultural Engineers (IAgrE)
- Institution of Chemical Engineers (IChemE)
- Institution of Civil Engineers (ICE)
- Institution of Engineering Designers (IED)
- Institution of Environmental Sciences (IES)
- Institution of Mechanical Engineers (IMechE)
- Nuclear Institute (NI)
- Royal Institution of Chartered Surveyors (RICS)
- Royal Society of Chemistry (RCS)
- Society of Operations Engineers (SOE)
