= CQP =

CQP can refer to:

- Constant QP, a rate control mode of the x265 software codec
- Cheniere Energy Partners LP, a natural gas business partner of GAIL, by NYSE stock code
- Professional Qualification Center, an organization located in El Jadida, Morocco
- Cape Flattery Airport, an airport in Cape Flattery, Queensland, Australia, by IATA code; see List of airports in Australia#Queensland
- Chartered Quality Professionals, a professional qualification in the UK; see Professional qualifications in the United Kingdom#Professional qualifications not included in the European directives
