= Mark Gray (photographer) =

Australian photographer

- Born: 20 February 1981 (age 45)
- Education: Swinburne University of Technology
- Known for: Photography
- Website: www.markgray.com.au

Mark Gray (born 20 February 1981) is an Australian photographer, famous for his panoramic landscape photographs, both in Australia and world-wide. He uses natural light to capture vibrant colours.

== Life and work ==
Gray was born in Melbourne, Australia to parents of Latvian, English and Irish heritage. In his teens he painted graffiti along railway lines and vacant walls in Melbourne. His graffiti informed his knowledge of colour, composition and artistic technique.

After completing a diploma in multimedia at Swinburne University of Technology in Wantirna at the age of 19, Gray started full-time work as a junior web designer, and continued in this for seven years.

In 2005, Gray established his first business, Australian Landscapes, later changing its name to Mark Gray Fine Art Landscape Photography. The first Mark Gray Gallery was established in 2011 in New South Wales’ seaside town of Merimbula. One year later, a second gallery was opened in Mornington, Victoria. He also conducts workshops in photography in Australia and elsewhere.

On 4 April 2012, Gray’s photographs, "Craig’s Hut" and "Reef Dreaming", appeared on Nine Network’s Mornings, program to showcase Australia’s top five views, which were voted by a panel of judges from Australian Traveller Magazine.

Gray uses natural light in his photographs. He revisits the same location, sometimes up to 20 times, in order to capture favourable light. Some of his photographs have taken years to capture – his photograph of "Craig’s Hut" took three years of repeated visits to Victoria's Mt. Stirling before he found what he was looking for.

== Honors and awards (selected) ==
- CIWEM’s Environmental Photographer of the Year, ‘Reef Dreaming’ finalist, 2010
- International Aperture Awards, winner of two silver awards and one bronze award, 2010
- EPSON International Panoramic Awards, winner of five bronze awards, 2010
- International Loupe Awards – Medium Format, winner of three silver awards and five bronze awards, 2011
- International Loupe Awards, winner of one silver award and five bronze awards, 2011
- EPSON International Panoramic Awards, winner of two silver awards and six bronze awards, 2011
- EPSON International Panoramic Awards, winner of gold award for ‘Reef Dreaming’, winner of one silver award and 13 bronze awards, 2012
- IPA, honourable mentions, 2012
- CAA, winner of three silver awards and five bronze awards, 2012
- International Loupe Awards, winner of two silver awards and 26 bronze awards, 2012
- EPSON International Panoramic Awards, winner of seven bronze awards, 2014
- International Garden Photographer of the Year, ‘Mystic Forest’, first place and category winner, 2014
- FMP Excellence in Business Awards, Mark Gray Gallery, finalist and winner, 2014IPA, ‘Shadowland’, honourable mention, 2014
