= Chartered Institute of Horticulture =

British professional association

- Abbreviation: CIH
- Formation: 1984
- Professional title: Chartered Horticulturist (CHort)
- Headquarters: BGA House, Nottingham Road, Louth, Lincolnshire, LN11 0WB
- Website: www.horticulture.org.uk
- Formerly called: Institute of Horticulture

The Chartered Institute of Horticulture (CIH) is a British professional association for horticulture.

Horticulture is not a regulated profession in the United Kingdom. However, professionals can seek Chartership to become a "Chartered Horticulturist". This is a protected title overseen by the CIH.

== History ==
The Horticultural Education Association, founded in 1905, was absorbed into the Institute of Horticulture in 1984.

The Institute of Horticulture received a royal charter on 21 July 2014.

== See also ==
- List of professional associations in the United Kingdom
- Royal Horticultural Society
