= Institute of Water =

Professional association for the water industry in the UK

The Institute of Water is the main professional association for the water industry in the UK.

== History ==
It was founded in 1945 as the Association of Water Distribution Officers. It was incorporated on 12 October 1954. It became the Institution of Water Officers in 1990, then the current name in 2010.

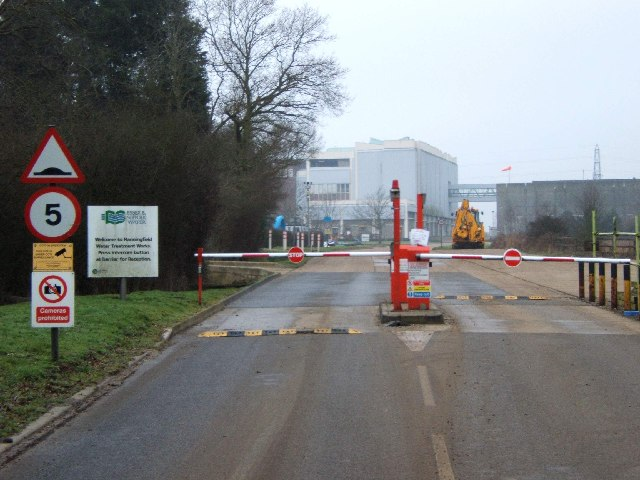
Hanningfield Waterworks at Hanningfield Reservoir in South Hanningfield, Essex, off the A130, in February 2006

== Function ==
=== Accreditation ===
It maintains a register of engineers in the British water industry, being affiliated to the Engineering Council to register Chartered Engineer (CEng) since 1998, Incorporated Engineer (IEng) and Engineering Technician (EngTech) since 1973. It is affiliated to the Society for the Environment since 2004. It is also affiliated with the Science Council to award Registered Science Technician (RSciTech), Registered Scientist (RSci), and Chartered Scientist (CSci).

== Structure ==
It is situated on Team Valley Trading Estate in the Metropolitan Borough of Gateshead, west of the River Team. It has been in North East England since 1975, and in Gateshead since 1998.

== See also ==
- Chartered Institution of Water and Environmental Management, situated in the London Borough of Camden
- List of professional associations in the United Kingdom
- Natural Environment Research Council
