= Chartered Institute for Securities & Investment =

UK professional association for the financial planning industry

- Logo of the CISI
- Abbreviation: CISI
- Formation: February 12, 1992; 34 years ago
- Legal status: Chartered Certified body, Registered Charity
- Headquarters: 20 Fenchurch Street; London, EC3
- Region served: 100 countries
- Products: Membership and Professional Qualifications for the financial services profession
- Members: 50,000
- Leader: Chief Executive - Tracy Vegro OBE
- Staff: 180
- Website: www.cisi.org

The Chartered Institute for Securities & Investment (CISI) is a professional body for members of the financial and investment profession. It offers qualifications and resources for professional development, as well as setting standards of conduct and ethics for those in the industry.

== History ==
The CISI was formed in 1992 as the Securities Institute by the members of the London Stock Exchange. It changed its name to the Securities and Investment Institute in November 2004 and then the Chartered Institute for Securities & Investment when it was granted a Royal Charter in October 2009. In November 2015, the Institute of Financial Planning merged with the CISI. In 2017, CISI, the Chartered Insurance Institute and the Chartered Institute of Bankers in Scotland formed the Chartered Body Alliance.

It is headquartered in London and has offices in Sri Lanka, India, United Arab Emirates, Ireland, and Kenya.

== Services ==
The institute offers qualifications, training and professional membership. It holds the UK licence to award the Certified Financial Planner (CFP) designation. Amongst the qualifications offered is the Diploma in Capital Markets which covers the areas of securities, investment, compliance, derivatives, corporate finance and operations. It is aimed at practitioners working in wholesale securities markets. Obtaining the CISI Diploma entitles candidates to join the CISI at MCSI Membership level.

Other qualifications offered include the Corporate Finance Qualification (CF), in conjunction with ICAEW, and the Chartered Wealth Manager Qualification (CWM). The CISI also offers a Continuing Professional Development (CPD) scheme to members. CISI produces publications and workbooks, runs conferences and seminars and in-house training courses.

== Link with other bodies ==
- MIPA/FIPA members of the Institute of Public Accountants are recognised by the Chartered Institute for Securities & Investment (CISI) for admission to CISI's full membership (MCSI). Full membership of the CISI.
- Chartered Body Alliance: An Alliance between CISI, Chartered Insurance Institute and Chartered Banker Institute formed in 2017.

== See also ==
- List of professional associations in the United Kingdom
- List of organisations in the United Kingdom with a royal charter
