= Chartered Institution of Wastes Management =

UK professional body

The Chartered Institution of Wastes Management (CIWM) is a professional body for the waste management industry, representing several individuals across the United Kingdom, Ireland and overseas. Based in Northampton, it has ten regional centres throughout England, Scotland, Wales, Northern Ireland and the Republic of Ireland, and is a member of the Society for the Environment. It awards the title of Chartered Waste Manager to qualifying members.

The objectives of the CIWM are to advance the scientific, technical and practical aspects of wastes and resource management for the safeguarding of the natural environment, to promote education, training, and research in wastes and resource management, and the dissemination of knowledge of the topic; and to strive to achieve and maintain the highest standards of best practice, technical competence and conduct by all its members.

The organisation was first established as the Association of Cleansing Superintendents of Great Britain on 25 June 1898, with waste managers from northern and Scottish cities, and was incorporated as the Institute of Cleansing Superintendents in 1908. It became the Institute of Public Cleansing in 1928, until 1981 when it was renamed to the Institute of Wastes Management. It was awarded a Royal Charter of Incorporation by Queen Elizabeth on 1 March 2002, and adopted its current name.

CIWM publishes the quarterly magazine 'Circular' and the quarterly Municipal Vehicle Operator, and holds an annual joint conference with the Environmental Services Association in London.

== Digital waste tracking ==
In October 2026, the UK government introduced mandatory digital waste tracking for all permitted and licensed waste receiving sites in England, Wales, and Northern Ireland, with Scotland following in January 2027. The programme, established under Section 58 of the Environment Act 2021, replaces paper-based waste transfer notes and consignment notes with a single digital system for recording waste movements across all four UK nations.

The system requires operators to record waste types, quantities, and destinations electronically through the Digital Waste Tracking Service, either via API integration or spreadsheet upload. The Environment Agency estimated that waste crime costs the UK economy approximately £1 billion per year, and that the previous paper-based system provided regulators with almost no real-time visibility of waste movements.

Phase 1 applies to approximately 12,000 permitted waste receiving facilities. Phase 2, scheduled for October 2027, will extend the requirement to registered waste carriers, brokers, dealers, and exporters. Non-compliance can result in civil penalties of up to £5,000 per incident and fines of up to £50,000 for duty of care failures under the Environmental Protection Act 1990.

== See also ==
- Chartered Institution of Water and Environmental Management
- List of organisations in the United Kingdom with a royal charter
- List of professional associations in the United Kingdom
