= Chartered Institute of Patent Attorneys =

British professional body

The Chartered Institute of Patent Attorneys (CIPA) is the British professional body of patent attorneys.

== History ==
The Chartered Institute of Patent Attorneys (CIPA) was founded in 1882 as the Chartered Institute of Patent Agents and incorporated by Royal Charter in 1891. CIPA changed its name in June 2006.

== Objects and function ==
CIPA is named in the Legal Services Act 2007 as the Approved Regulator for the patent attorney profession in the UK. Under the Legal Services Act, CIPA has to separate its regulatory activities from its representative work as the professional body for patent attorneys. In 2010, CIPA and the Chartered Institute of Trade Mark Attorneys (CITMA) set up the Intellectual Property Regulation Board (IPReg) to undertake jointly the regulation of the patent attorney and trade mark attorney professions.

CIPA maintains the statutory Register of Patent Attorneys on behalf of the Department for Business, Energy and Industrial Strategy reporting to the comptroller-general of patents, trade marks and designs at the UK Intellectual Property Office.

== Notable members ==
- Sharon Bowles, British MEP
- Walter de Havilland (Foreign Member, 1909–1942)

== See also ==
- British professional bodies
- Intellectual property organization
- List of topics related to the United Kingdom
- UK Intellectual Property Office
