= Environmental Services Association =

Professional organisation in the United Kingdom

The Environmental Services Association (ESA) is a professional organisation in the United Kingdom representing the UK's waste and secondary resources industry. The ESA's members include the major waste management companies in the UK and is open to all organisations involved in the management of wastes.

== Foundation ==
The organisation was founded in 1968 by waste industry leaders including the following:

- Tony Morgan, Purle Bros Ltd.
- Don Pannell, A A Pannell Ltd.
- Malcolm Wood, Leigh Interests Ltd.
- Colin Drinkwater, W W Drinkwater Ltd.
- Anthony Shutes, Hales Containers Ltd.
- Richard Biffa, Biffa Waste Services Ltd.
- Tony Smith, Waste Management Ltd.
- Sam Hemmings, S Hemmings Bristol Ltd.
- Harold Mould, Cleansing Service Group Ltd.

The current Executive Director is Jacob Hayler, who was appointed to the role in 2015.

== See also ==
- North London Waste Authority
