= British Osteopathic Association =

- Abbreviation: BOA
- Successor: Institute of Osteopathy
- Formation: 1998
- Dissolved: 2014
- Type: Professional association
- Main organ: Council
- Website: osteopathy.org

The British Osteopathic Association (BOA) was an independent organisation representing osteopaths. In July 2014, the BOA became the Institute of Osteopathy, with a focus on improving public health and patient care.
