= Institution of Environmental Sciences =

UK professional body

- Founded: 1972
- Founder: Julian Snow, Baron Burntwood
- Type: Professional body
- Purpose: Environmental Science
- Region served: Worldwide
- Method: Education, advice, support, CPD
- President: Julie Hill
- Key people: Adam Donnan (CEO) Bernard Devereux (Chair)
- Website: www.the-ies.org

The Institution of Environmental Sciences (IES) is a professional association and registered charity in the United Kingdom. The organisation promotes environmental protection and conservation, and performs related education and meta-analysis of scientific research. IES is a constituent body of both the Society for the Environment (SocEnv), and the Science Council and trains environmental technicians, chartered environmentalist and chartered scientist qualifications. The IES provides administration for two other organisations in the UK: the Community for Environmental Disciplines in Higher Education which accredit university programmes, and for the Institute of Air Quality Management.

The IES maintains the environmental SCIENTIST journal, sent quarterly to members and available open access three-months after publication. Articles are written by experts and professionals working in the environmental field. IES also publishes reports on issues in the environmental science sector and provides guidance for professionals working in environmental science.

== History ==
The Institution of Environmental Sciences was founded as a result of an initiative by Dr John Rose during a series of meetings held during 1971-1972 at the Royal Society in London and chaired by Lord Burntwood.

== See also ==
- List of environmental journals
