= British Pest Control Association =

British Pest Control Association (BPCA) is a not-for-profit organisation and trade association representing over 750 organisations and more than 3500 individuals with a professional interest in the eradication of public health pests without risk to third parties, non-target species or the environment. Member criteria are strict, and include adequate insurance, professional qualifications, CPD and adherence to Codes of Practice.

BPCA provides a wide range of benefits and services to members including technical advice and support, sample documentation, and appearance on the Association's directory.

Only full servicing and consultant BPCA members appear in the web-based search or via the telephone service centre based in Derby, where BPCA is administered.

As of 2024, the current president of the BPCA is Chris Cagienard.

== Pests in the United Kingdom ==
There are thought to be around 120 million rats in the United Kingdom; some figures estimate around 81 million brown rats (Rattus norvegicus).

== Training ==
BPCA offers a number of training courses and exams working in partnership with The Royal Society for Public Health (RSPH). The primary qualification for pest technicians is currently known as the Level 2 Award in Pest Management.

== PestEx ==
PestEx is BPCA's biennial exhibition for the industry and its customers. It is a two-day event featuring industry relevant exhibitors and seminars. In 2017, there were over 2500 attendees.

== PestAware (Blog) ==
PestAware blogs are published once a month by BPCA and its members on different aspects of pest control.

== Professional Pest Controller PPC (magazine) ==
A paper and electronic magazine aimed at those working in the pest control industry and focusing on technical, commercial, customer service advice in addition to the latest news, events and updates regarding professional pest management.

== See also ==
- List of mammals of Great Britain
