= Institution of Agricultural Engineers =

- Abbreviation: IAgrE
- Formation: 1938
- Legal status: Not-for-profit organisation
- Purpose: Represents professional Agricultural Engineers in the UK
- Location: The Bullock Building, University Way, Cranfield, Bedfordshire, MK43 0GH
- Region served: UK
- Members: Agricultural Engineers
- Chief Executive Officer: Charles Nicklin CEng MIAgrE MIMechE
- Main organ: IAgrE Council
- Affiliations: European Society of Agricultural Engineers
- Website: IAgrE

The Institution of Agricultural Engineers (IAgrE) is a British professional engineering institution founded in 1938. It is licensed by the Engineering Council to assess candidates for inclusion on its Register of professional Engineers and Technicians.

== Function ==
The IAgrE is the professional body for engineers, scientists, technologists and managers in agricultural and allied landbased industries, including forestry, food engineering and technology, amenity, renewable energy, horticulture and the environment.

As a founding Constituent Body (CB) of the Society for the Environment, IAgrE also assesses suitably qualified and experienced candidates for registration as Chartered Environmentalists (CEnv).

== See also ==
- Chartered Engineer
- Chartered Environmentalist
- Incorporated Engineer
- Engineering Technician

IAgrE also runs two technician accreditation schemes for the sector:

- Landbased Technician Accreditation (LTA) scheme for field equipment (on behalf of the Agricultural Engineers Association) (AEA)
- Landbased Technician Accreditation Scheme (LTAMEA) for the Milking Equipment Association (MEA)
