= Institute of Environmental Management and Assessment =

The Institute of Sustainability and Environmental Professionals (ISEP) formerly known as the Institute of Environmental Management and Assessment (IEMA) is the global membership body for sustainability and environmental practitioners, with over 20,000 members.

Members receive updates on current environmental law and legislation, and the group organises over 100 regional events on environmental topics to communicate current best practice guidance. It also publishes Transform magazine six times a year, best practice workbooks on individual sustainability and environmental themes, and organises national conferences that feature international experts and opinion.

ISEP membership aims to ensure that candidates are knowledgeable, competent and highly trained. Environmental jobs are listed on ISEP's website at isepjobs.org. Organisations are challenged to operate in an environmentally considerate fashion, and the UK Government's agenda on climate change and a low carbon and resource efficient economy has meant that ISEP is consulted on major issues, with ISEP involving its members in a majority of these consultations.

ISEP is a constituent body of the Society for the Environment (SocEnv), which enables ISEP members to progress to Chartered Environmentalist status.

ISEP is the Competent Body in the UK for the European Union's Eco-Management and Audit Scheme (EMAS). ISEP also promotes the Acorn Scheme (BS 8555), the phased approach to the ISO 14001 environmental management system.

ISEP also approves training course providers to deliver sustainability and environmental training. There are currently over 80 ISEP-approved training providers.

== Transform ==
Transform (formerly known as "The Environmentalist") is a magazine for sustainability and environmental professionals, published six times per year by the Institute of Sustainability and Environmental Professionals in the UK. Topics include news, policy, environmental law, best practice and institute news. It is sent free of charge to members of ISEP.
