= Chartered (professional) =

Professional designation indicating deep expertise

A chartered professional is a person who has gained a specific level of skill or competence in a particular field of work, which has been recognised by the award of a formal credential by a relevant professional organization. Chartered status is considered a mark of professional competency, and is awarded mainly by chartered professional bodies and learned societies. It is common in Britain but is also used in Ireland, the United States and the Commonwealth, and has been adopted by organisations around the world.

Chartered status originates from royal charters issued to professional bodies in the UK by the British Monarch, although such is the prestige and credibility of a chartered designation that some non-UK organisations have taken to issuing chartered designations without Royal or Parliamentary approval. In the UK, chartered titles may still only be awarded by institutions that have been incorporated under royal charter, with the permission of the Privy Council. The standards for chartered titles in the UK are set between the professional bodies and relevant government departments, and cannot be changed without government permission. Some chartered statuses in Ireland are regulated professional titles under European professional qualification directives, as were many in the UK until Brexit.

The full title used differs from profession to profession and is normally of the form "Chartered Profession", for example, Chartered Engineer and Chartered Accountant.

== Standing and usage ==
Chartered status is generally considered a terminal qualification in a particular profession. In some fields professional bodies also offer lower level qualifications, such as Incorporated Engineer (IEng), Engineering Technician (EngTech) or Registered Scientist (RSci). The status is not the same as the senior membership grade of Fellow in many professional institutes and learned societies, which is usually a measure of achievement or standing in a profession rather than a professional qualification based on assessment of competencies.

Chartered status is a form of accreditation, with there being a grant of a protected title but no requirement to be chartered in order to practice a profession (making it distinct from licensing). In the UK and other countries that follow its model, the professional bodies overseeing chartered statuses have a duty to act in the public interest, rather than in the interests of their members, ensuring that chartered professionals must meet ethical standards of behaviour. As a status, rather than simply a qualification, a chartered title may be removed for failure to adhere to codes of conduct, or lost through non-renewal. Someone who has lost the status may no longer describe themselves as chartered.

Many chartered statuses require initial academic preparation, and the guidance provided by the Privy Council in the UK states that "the usual expectation is qualification to master's level or above". After completion of academic training, it is normal to have to complete Initial Professional Development (IPD), which may include professional courses and examinations, to gain the competencies necessary for chartered status. Many chartered statuses also have a requirement that holders undertake Continuing Professional Development (CPD) to maintain and update their competencies, with some requiring evidence of CPD at regular intervals to renew the status, and "a robust Continuous Professional Development regime" is expected by the Privy Council. In the UK, the Privy Council has stated that its policy is "that the criteria for individual Chartered Status should be broadly similar across the professions". They also caution that "Individual Chartered designations that are not approved by The Sovereign in Council, or the Privy Council are not recognised by the UK Government and no assurance can be given that such designations meet the same high standards as authorised designations". There is also an expectation that professional bodies granted power to award individual chartered statuses should have a complaints procedure and a disciplinary procedure in place.

In the UK, chartered professional titles may only be trademarked if issued by a body holding a royal charter and which has permission under its charter to grant that title. Chartered professional titles are normally only permitted to be registered as collective trade marks. Guidance provided by the United Kingdom Intellectual Property Office is that the use of the word "chartered" in a trademark by a non-chartered organisation "would mislead the public into believing that the association and its members have chartered status".

In the US, "chartered" is considered a descriptive term, thus trademarks using "chartered" along with a descriptive title for the profession may only be registered on the principal register if they can be demonstrated to have acquired distinctiveness through exclusive usage in trade for at least five years. Alternatively, they may be registered on the supplemental register.

== International use ==
The two best known chartered statuses are probably Chartered Engineer and Chartered Accountant, along with their derivatives. Examples of their use outside of the UK include Chartered Engineer (CEng) in Ireland (granted in 1969 by the Oireachtas), India and Singapore; Chartered Professional Engineer (CPEng) in Australia and New Zealand (under the Chartered Professional Engineers of New Zealand Act 2002); ASEAN Chartered Professional Engineer (ACPE) in participating ASEAN member states by the ASEAN Chartered Professional Engineer Coordinating Committee; Chartered Accountant in Australia, India, Ireland, New Zealand, Pakistan, Singapore, South Africa and Zambia; and Chartered Professional Accountant in Canada. Chartered Engineer (or a derivative) is also used in the official translation of titles from Austria, Croatia, the Czech Republic, Iceland and Slovakia, while Chartered Accountant (or a derivative) is used in the official translation of titles from Austria, France, Hungary, Iceland, and Romania.

In the US Chartered qualifications are offered by private education providers such as The American College of Financial Services and the Global Academy of Finance & Management (formerly the American Academy of Financial Management). Unlike chartered qualifications in most countries, these are not issued under a royal/government charter or legislation. The UK Intellectual Property Office refused a trademark application for the US Chartered Financial Analyst qualification on the grounds that it was not granted by a body with a royal charter and therefore had the potential to be deceptive.

== Historical development ==
While the concept of royal charters dates back to the eleventh century, the idea of someone being a chartered professional only dates to the 19th century. The first chartered professionals were accountants in Scotland. The Society of Accountants in Edinburgh (now part of the Institute of Chartered Accountants of Scotland) was founded in 1853 and the title Chartered Accountant was in use by 1855. The title spread to England and Wales with the granting of a charter to the Institute of Chartered Accountants in England and Wales in 1880 and to Ireland with the chartering of the Institute of Chartered Accountants in Ireland in 1888.

The next professionals to adopt the title were Chartered Surveyors in 1903 and Chartered Directors in 1906. These were followed between the wars by Chartered Civil Engineers (1923), Chartered Electrical Engineers (1924), Chartered Architects (1924) Chartered Textile Technologists (1925) and Chartered Mechanical Engineers (1930). Coverage of the grant to the Institution of Civil Engineers made it clear that the title Chartered Civil Engineer was intended to act as a form of occupational closure:

While the unregulated use of the appellation "Civil Engineer" has deprived that title of professional significance, the designation of corporate membership of the Institution ("M.Inst.C.E." or "Assoc. M.Inst.C.E.") is recognised as an authoritative mark of professional competence. Nevertheless, the mere designation of membership of a Society has not, in recent years, been found to convey that definite idea of professional status to which the public is accustomed. The introduction of the title "Chartered Civil Engineer" therefore marks an important stage in the long history of the Institution.

— "Institution of Civil Engineers". The Yorkshire Post. 2 January 1924 – via British Newspaper Archive.

In the Commonwealth, the title Chartered Accountant was adopted by Acts of Parliament in Canada in 1902 and in South Africa in 1927. It spread to Australia in 1928 with the granting of a royal charter to the Institute of Chartered Accountants in Australia (now part of Chartered Accountants Australia and New Zealand). The Institute of Chartered Accountants of India was established by Act of Parliament in 1949 and the Institute of Chartered Accountants of Pakistan by Act of Parliament in 1961.

Development in the US began in 1927 with the establishment of the American College of Life Underwriters (now The American College of Financial Services) offering the Chartered Life Underwriter designation. This marked not only the first use of a chartered title in the US but also the first use without government permission by either Charter or Act of Parliament. This was a sharp contrast to the situation in the Commonwealth, where accountants in South Africa and Australia had been engaged in a decades-long struggle to gain the right to use a chartered title that came to fruition at about the same time. The CLU was followed, after many years of preparatory work, by the incorporation of the Institute of Chartered Financial Analysts (now the CFA Institute) in 1962 and the creation of the Chartered Financial Analyst designation in 1963.

With the engineering profession in the UK fractured into many different professional institutions, the 13 chartered engineering institutions formed the Engineering Institutes Joint Council in 1962, which was chartered as the Council of Engineering Institutions in 1965 and introduced the title of Chartered Engineer with the designatory letters CEng. This marked the introduction of separate post-nominals for chartered status, which had previously been (and still is in many institutions) marked by the same post-nominals as membership. The CEng spread to Ireland a few years later in 1969. Following the introduction of the CEng, many scientific professional bodies also gained the right to award chartered status, such as Chartered Chemist (1975), Chartered Biologist (1979), Chartered Physicist (1985) and Chartered Geologist (1990). This expansion was driven less by occupational closure than a desire to demonstrate professional equality with the engineers.

When the European Communities (Recognition of Professional Qualifications) Regulations were introduced in the UK in 1991, they featured 40 chartered statuses, including five forms of Chartered Surveyor from the Royal Institution of Chartered Surveyors, Chartered Accountants from three different bodies, and two titles from the Chartered Insurance Institute. The 2015 version of the regulations, from 2015, listed 71 chartered statuses, including 20 varieties of Chartered Surveyor. As of 2025, The UK Privy Council list of approved chartered titles includes over 120 titles.

The 21st century has seen moves to increase professionalism. The Chartered Physicist status, for example, has, since 2001, required a master's degree to fulfill the academic preparation and is no longer awarded automatically to all corporate members of the Institute of Physics, and since 2012 has required evidence of CPD to be presented to renew the status every 3 years. Similarly Chartered Engineers in the UK have needed a master's degree since 2012, and in Ireland since 2013. The Chartered Scientist title, introduced in 2004, required a master's degree and annual re-validation through evidence of CPD from the start.

== Titles ==
Not an exhaustive list:

=== United Kingdom ===
The following titles have been approved by the Privy Council.

- Chartered Accountant (CA/ACA/FCA)
- Chartered Actuary (Fellow/Associate) (FIA/FIA C.Act/FFA/FFA C.Act/AIA/AIA C.Act/AFA/AFA C.Act)
- Chartered Adjudicator (C.Adj)
- Chartered Arbitrator (FCIArb)
- Chartered Arboriculturist/Chartered Forester (MICFor)
- Chartered Architect (RIBA/RIAS/FRIAS)
- Chartered Architectural Technologist (MCIAT)
- Chartered Banker (MCIBS)
- Chartered Biologist (CBiol)
- Chartered Builder (MCIOB/FCIOB) (Note: Members of the Chartered Institute of Building may choose to be Chartered Builders or Chartered Construction Managers)
- Chartered Building Engineer (CBuildE)
- Chartered Building Services Engineer (MCIBSE)
- Chartered Certified Accountant (ACCA/FCCA)
- Chartered Chemical Engineer (MIChemE)
- Chartered Chemist (CChem)
- Chartered Civil Engineer (MICE)
- Chartered Colourist (CCol)
- Chartered Construction Manager (MCIOB/FCIOB)
- Chartered Cyber Security Professional (ChCSP)
- Chartered Designer (MCSD)
- Chartered Director (CDir)
- Chartered Educational Assessor (CEA)
- Chartered Electrical Engineer (MIET/FIET) (Note: No longer granted but may still be used by members of the Institution of Engineering and Technology awarded the title prior to 6 June 2002)
- Chartered Energy Engineer/Chartered Petroleum Engineer/Chartered Energy Manager (MEI/FEI)
- Chartered Engineer (CEng)
- Chartered Environmental Health Officer (Ch EHO)
- Chartered Environmental Health Practitioner (CEnvH)
- Chartered Environmentalist (CEnv)
- Chartered Ergonomist and Human Factors Specialist (CErgHF)
- Chartered Financial Planner (AFPS)
- Chartered Gas Engineer (MIGEM)
- Chartered Geographer (CGeog)
- Chartered Geologist (CGeol)
- Chartered Governance Professional (FCG/FCIS/ACG/ACIS), one of the two designations awarded by the Chartered Governance Institute.
- Chartered Horticulturist (CHort)
- Chartered Insurer/Chartered Insurance Practitioner/Chartered Insurance Broker/Chartered Insurance Risk Manager/Chartered Insurance Underwriting Agent (ACII/FCII)
- Chartered IT Professional (CITP)
- Chartered Landscape Architect (FLI/CMLI)
- Chartered Legal Executive/Chartered Legal Executive Advocate (FCILEx)
- Chartered Fellow/Member of the Chartered Institute of Library and Information Professionals (FCLIP/MCLIP)
- Chartered Linguist (CL)
- Chartered Fellow/Member of the Chartered Institute of Logistics and Transport (FCILT/CMILT)
- Chartered Loss Adjuster (CLA)
- Chartered Management Accountant (ACMA/FCMA)
- Chartered Fellow/Member of the Chartered Institute for the Management of Sport and Physical Activity (FCIMSPA (chartered)/MCIMSPA (chartered))
- Chartered Fellow/Member of the Institute of Internal Auditors (CFIIA/CMIIA)
- Chartered Management Consultant (ChMC)
- Chartered Member/Fellow of the Chartered Institute for the Management of Sport and Physical Activity (FCIMSPA (chartered)/MCIMSPA (chartered))
- Chartered Member of the Institute of Internal Auditors (CMIIA)
- Chartered Manager (CMgr)
- Chartered Marine Engineer/Chartered Marine Scientist/Chartered Marine Technologist (CMarEng)
- Chartered Marketer (CMktr)
- Chartered Master Mariner (CMMar)
- Chartered Mathematician (CMath)
- Chartered Mathematics Teacher (CMathTeach)
- Chartered Mechanical Engineer (MIMechE/FIMechE) (Note: If corporate members before 10 July 2003)
- Chartered Measurement and Control Technologist (MInstMC)
- Chartered Meteorologist (CMet)
- Chartered Occupational Hygienist (CMFOH/CFFOH)
- Chartered Patent Attorney (CPA)
- Chartered Fellow/Member of the Chartered Institute of Personnel and Development (FCIPD/MCIPD)
- Chartered Photographer (CPhot)
- Chartered Physicist (CPhys)
- Chartered Physiotherapist (MCSP (UK)/MISCP (Ireland))
- Chartered Procurement and Supply Professional (MCIPS/FCIPS)
- Chartered Project Management Professional (CPMP)
- Chartered Property Casualty Underwriter (CPCU)
- Chartered Psychologist (CPsychol)
- Chartered Public Finance Accountant (CIPFA)
- Chartered Public Relations Practitioner (Chart.PR)
- Chartered Quality Professional (CQP MCQI/CQP FCQI)
- Chartered Radiation Protection Professional (CRadP)
- Chartered Real Estate Consultant
- Chartered Safety and Health Professional (CMIOSH/CFIOSH) (Note: The Occupational Safety and Health Consultants Register (OSHCR) regards 'CMIOSH' as an equal to Fellows (FIIRSM))
- Chartered Scientist (CSci)
- Chartered Science Teacher (CSciTeach)
- Chartered Secretary (FCG/FCIS/ACG/ACIS)
- Chartered Fellow/Member of the Chartered Institute for Securities and Investment (Chartered FCISI/Chartered MCISI)
- Chartered Fellow/Member of the Chartered Institute for Securities and Investment (Chartered FCISI/Chartered MCISI)
- Chartered Wealth Manager of the Chartered Institute for Securities & Investment
- Chartered Fellow (Financial Planning) of the Chartered Institute for Securities & Investment (Chartered FCSI (Financial Planning))
- Chartered Security Professional (CSyP)
- Chartered Shipbroker (MICS)
- Chartered Statistician (CStat)
- Chartered Structural Engineer (AIStructE/MIStructE/FIStructE)
- Chartered Surveyor (MRICS or FRICS)
  - Also Chartered Arts and Antiques Surveyor; Chartered Building Surveyor; Chartered Building Control Surveyor; Chartered Civil Engineering Surveyor; Chartered Commercial Property Surveyor; Chartered Construction Surveyor; Chartered Engineering Surveyor; Chartered Environmental Surveyor; Chartered Facilities Management Surveyor; Chartered Forestry Surveyor; Chartered Hydrographic Surveyor; Chartered Land Surveyor; Chartered Machinery Valuation Surveyor; Chartered Management Consultancy Surveyor; Chartered Minerals Surveyor; Chartered Planning and Development Surveyor; Chartered Project Management Surveyor; Chartered Quantity Surveyor; Chartered Valuation Surveyor.
- Chartered Tax Adviser (CTA)
- Chartered Teacher of English (CTE)
- Chartered Technological Product Designer CTPD)
- Chartered Textile Technologist (CText)
- Chartered Town Planner (MRTPI)
- Chartered Trading Standards Practitioner (CTSP)
- Chartered Transport Planning Professional (CTPP)
- Chartered Waste Manager (MCIWM)
- Chartered Water and Environment Manager (C.WEM)

=== United States ===
- Chartered Advisor in Philanthropy (CAP)
- Chartered Advisor for Senior Living (CASL)
- Chartered Alternative Investment Analyst (CAIA)
- Chartered Business Consultant
- Chartered Enterprise Risk Analyst
- Chartered Federal Employee Benefits Consultant
- Chartered Financial Analyst (CFA)
- Chartered Financial Consultant
- Chartered Financial Consultant (ChFC)
- Chartered Health Care Consultant (ChHC)
- Chartered Leadership Fellow (CLF)
- Chartered Life Underwriter (CLU)
- Chartered Market Technician (CMT)
- Chartered Mutual Fund Counselor (CMFC)
- Chartered Realty Investor
- Chartered Senior Financial Planner
- Chartered Special Needs Consultant
- Chartered Wealth Advisor

=== Australia ===
- Chartered Accountant
- Chartered Building Professional (MAIB/FAIB/LFAIB)
- Chartered Professional Engineer (CPEng)
- Chartered Tax Adviser (CTA)

=== Canada ===
- Chartered Administrator (C.Adm.)/
- Chartered Appraiser/Chartered Assessor
- Chartered Business Valuator (CBV)
- Chartered Investment Manager (CIM)
- Chartered Professional Accountant (CPA)

=== Other countries ===
- ASEAN Chartered Professional Engineer (ACPE)
- Chartered Administrator (ACIA) (Nigeria)
- Chartered Accountant (India, Ireland, New Zealand, Pakistan, Singapore, South Africa and Zambia)
- Chartered Development Finance Analyst (CDFA) (South Africa)
- Chartered Engineer (CEng) (Ireland, India and Singapore)
- Chartered Professional in Islamic Finance (CPIF) (Malaysia)
- Chartered Professional Engineer (CPEng) (New Zealand)
