= Chartered Institute of Internal Auditors =

UK professional body

- Abbreviation: Chartered IIA
- Formation: 1948; 78 years ago (chartered in 2010; 16 years ago)
- Legal status: Not-for-profit organisation
- Purpose: Internal audit and governance in the United Kingdom and Ireland
- Location(s): Alliance House, Caxton Street London, SW1H 0QS; England, United Kingdom
- Region served: United Kingdom and Ireland
- Members: 10,000
- Chief Executive: Anne Kiem
- Main organ: Chartered IIA Council
- Affiliations: Institute of Internal Auditors
- Website: charterediia.org

The Chartered Institute of Internal Auditors was founded in 1948 and attained its Royal Charter in 2010. It represents internal auditors in the United Kingdom and Ireland, and is affiliated to the United States-based Global Institute of Internal Auditors. It is also a member of the European Confederation of Institutes of Internal Auditors (ECIIA), and is the only professional membership body in the UK dedicated to Internal Audit.

The Chartered IIA works closely with the Global Institute of Internal Auditors based in Orlando, Florida, and support the International Professional Practices Framework (IPPF) and are bound by a code of ethics.

The Chartered IIA currently have approximately 10,000 members and work very closely with some of the biggest private companies, Central Government, and local councils.

== Career Pathway ==
The Chartered Institute of Internal Auditors is a respected and influential professional body in the UK and Ireland, the only to the profession of internal audit. The Chartered IIA also support compliance, risk management and associated business areas.

In 2020, the Chartered IIA launched the Internal Audit Practitioner programme, and in 2022, a brand new syllabus. The bulk of the Chartered IIA's students are working towards the Certified Internal Audit designation.

The Chartered IIA offers two apprenticeships: Internal Audit Practitioner (Level 4) and Internal Audit Professional (Level 7).

The Chartered IIA distinguishes between two membership classes: Certified Professional members hold the CIA designation, and Chartered Professional members hold CMIIA. Members are required to undertake Continuing Professional Education to maintain their designation. Non-qualified individuals can also join the Chartered IIA as affiliate members.

The Certified Internal Auditor (CIA) is focused on the various aspects of internal audit, while Chartered Internal Audit focusses on the leadership skills required to head up an internal audit function. To successfully apply for the CIA, students must hold a degree. Non-graduates can study the CIA by first completing the Internal Audit Practitioner programme.

== See also ==
- List of professional associations in the United Kingdom
