= Institute of Marine Engineering, Science and Technology =

UK professoinal organization

Institute of Marine Engineering, Science & Technology
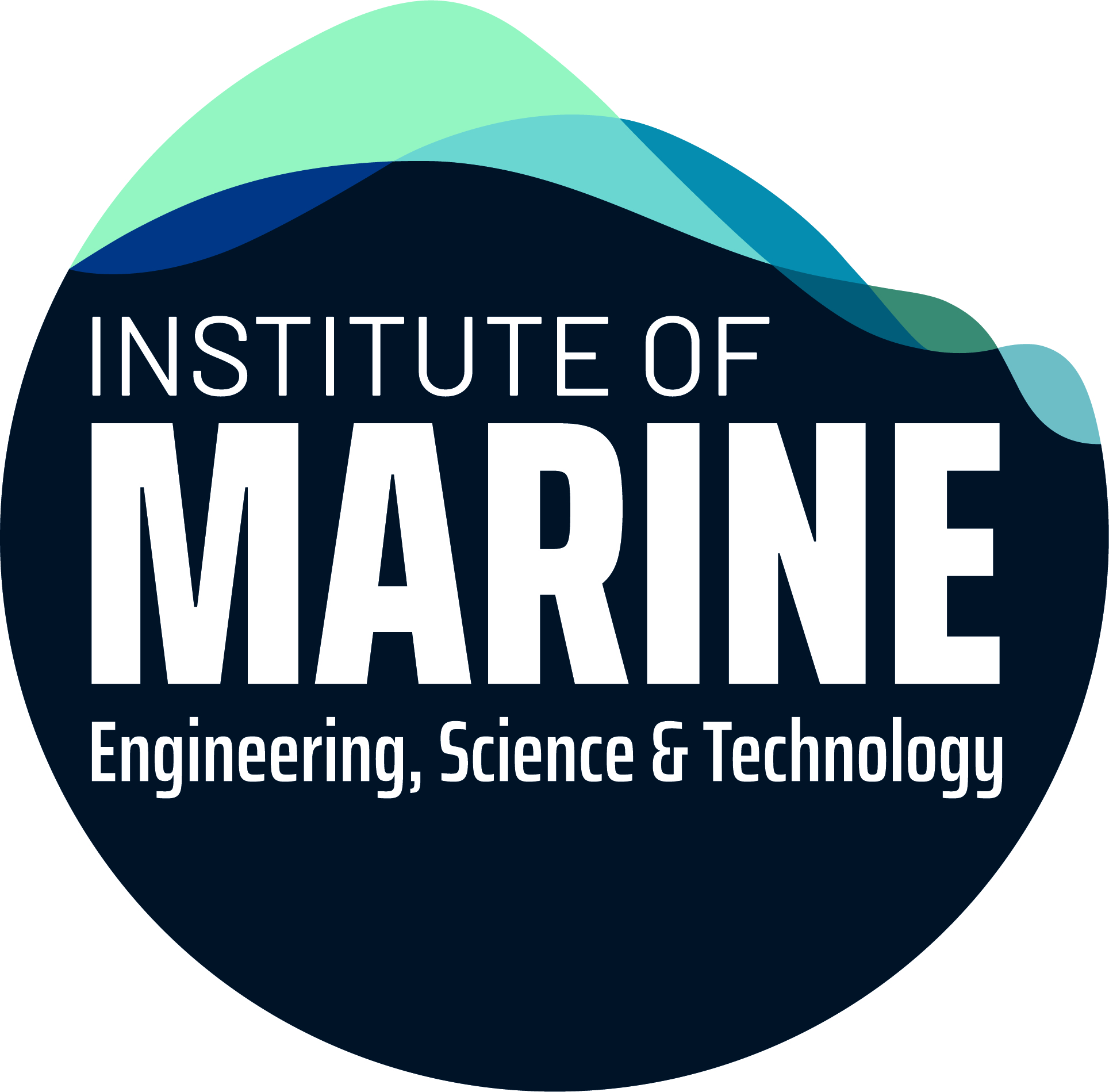
- Abbreviation: IMarEST
- Formation: 1888
- Type: Learned society, Professional association and Chartered body
- Purpose: A world where marine resources and activities are sustained, managed and developed for the benefit of humanity
- Headquarters: London, SW1; United Kingdom
- Members: 21,000+ individual members and students
- Chief Executive Officer: Chris Goldsworthy
- President: Yves De Leeneer
- President Elect: Professor Stephen de Mora
- Website: www.imarest.org
- Formerly called: Institute of Marine Engineers

The Institute of Marine Engineering, Science and Technology (IMarEST) is the international membership body and learned society for marine professionals operating in the spheres of marine engineering, science, or technology. It has registered charity status in the UK. It has a worldwide membership of over 12,000 individuals based in over 128 countries. The institute is a member of the UK Science Council and a licensed body of the Engineering Council UK.

== Overview ==
The Institute of Marine Engineering, Science and Technology was the international membership body and learned society for professionals operating in the spheres of marine engineering, science, or technology.

The Institute envisions "a world where marine resources and activities are sustained, managed and developed for the benefit of humanity."

The mission of the institute is described as "to work within the global marine community to promote the scientific development of marine engineering, science and technology, providing opportunities for the exchange of ideas and practices and upholding the status, standards and knowledge of marine professionals worldwide."

IMarEST is also a publisher of books, periodicals, journals and papers related to marine engineering, science and technology, and organises meetings, events and conferences related to these themes. The institute is also the home of the Guild of Benevolence of the IMarEST, which continues the work of the fund founded for the families of the engineers of the Titanic, and which today provides help and funds for those seafarers and others who find themselves in hard times.

== History ==
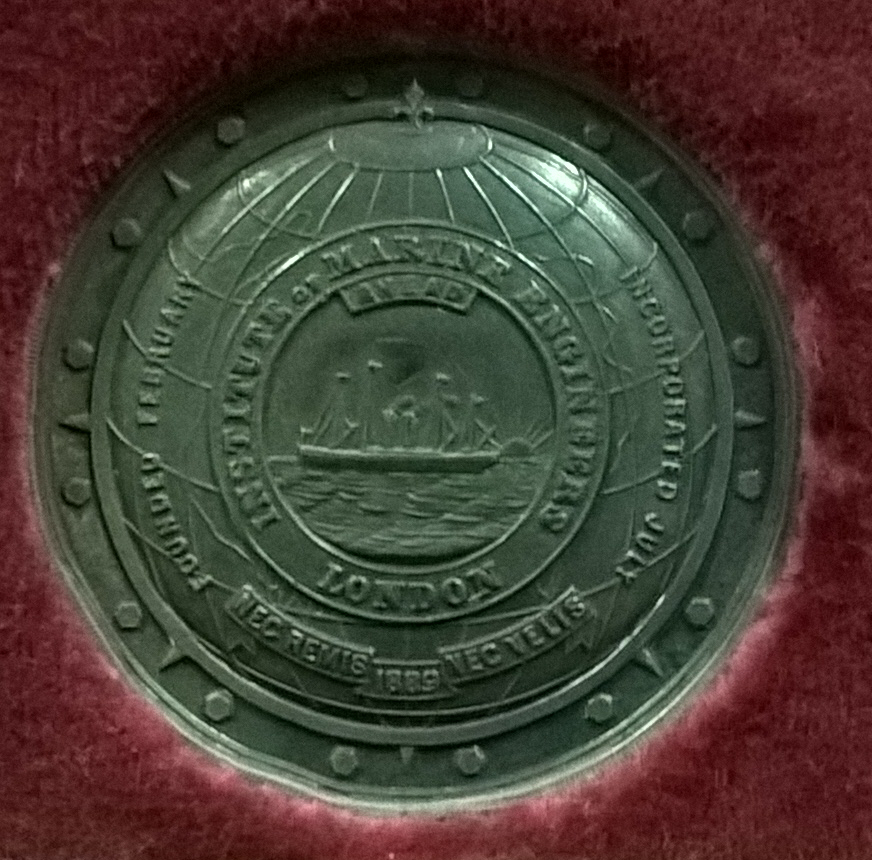
Medal awarded to Robert Hadfield 1928

The Institute of Marine Engineers had its headquarters at 88 Minories in the City of London. It changed its name to the IMarEST in 1999. It has since moved to a location in Westminster.

Since January 2024, its Chief Executive has been Chris Goldsworthy.

=== Secretary/Chief Executive ===
- James Adamson, Secretary, 1889–1931
- Bernard Charles Curling, Secretary, 1930–1951
- J. Stuart Robinson, Secretary, 1951–1987
- Jolyon Slogget, Secretary, 1986–1999
- Keith Read, Secretary, 1999–2009
- Marcus Jones, Secretary, 2009–2011
- David Loosley, CEO, 2011–2020
- Gwynne Lewis, CEO, 2020–2024
- Chris Goldsworthy, CEO, 2024 -

== IMarEST topics ==
=== International standing ===
The IMarEST has special consultative status with the Economic and Social Council of the United Nations (ECOSOC) and is a nominated and licensed body of the Engineering Council (UK), a member of the Science Council and has links with many other maritime organisations worldwide.

The IMarEST's international dimension is reinforced by the activities of its divisions and branches located across the globe:

- European Division – 25 branches
- ANZSPAC (Australia, New Zealand & South Pacific) Division – 9 branches
- Middle East Division – 5 branches
- South East Asia Division – 3 branches
- Americas Division – 3 branches
- North East Asia Division – 2 branches

These branches provide a local focus to activities, networks, conferences, meetings and events, and for developing and maintaining links and partnerships with people and organisations in key regions in the marine world.

=== Members ===
The IMarEST has different categories of membership for those who are seeking professional recognition (Corporate Membership), for those who are currently studying or just starting out in their careers or those who simply have a general interest in the IMarEST, its work, its members, events, publications or facilities (non-Corporate Membership).

IMarEST members include those working in:

- Commercial Shipping
- Fishing, Aquaculture & Biotechnology
- Ship design, construction, maintenance & decommission
- Marine Finance, Insurance & Risk
- Ports & Harbours
- Marine Law, Governance & Regulation
- Defence and Naval Engineering
- Marine Renewables
- Marine Engineering Systems & Equipment
- Marine Safety & Security
- Power & Propulsion
- Oceanography, Climatology & Marine Meteorology
- Coast & Ocean Mapping & Hydrography
- Natural Hazards
- Navigation & Communication
- Offshore Oil & Gas
- Marine Environment & Pollution
- Underwater Technology & Operations
- Coastal & Shelf Seas
- Marine Leisure
- Marine Surveyors

...plus additional marine science, engineering and technology disciplines and applications.

=== Corporate membership categories ===
IMarEST have defined three types of membership categories:

- Fellow : Fellows are those who qualify for the category of Member and have demonstrated to the satisfaction of Council a level of knowledge and understanding, competence and commitment involving superior responsibility for the conceptual design, management or the execution of important work in a marine related profession, and have given a commitment to abide by the institute's Code of Professional Conduct.
- Member : Members are those who qualify for the category of Associate Member and have demonstrated to the satisfaction of Council that they have achieved a position of professional standing having normally been professionally engaged in the marine sector for a period of five years that includes significant responsibility and have given a commitment to abide by the institute's Code of Professional Conduct
- Associate Member : Associate Members those demonstrating to the satisfaction of Council that they have achieved a position as a technician, or are professionally engaged in Initial Professional Development or occupy an occupational role in the marine sector, and have given a commitment to abide by the institute's Code of Professional Conduct

And two types of non-corporate membership categories:

- Affiliate : Affiliates may either be those with an interest in, or who may contribute to, the activities of the Institute or; persons who, in the opinion of Council, can contribute to, or wish to have access to, the technical services of the institute, being resident in a recognised overseas territory and also members of a professional society with which the institute has a reciprocal arrangement.
- Student : Student members are those enrolled on a programme of further or higher education accredited or recognised by the IMarEST.

=== Registration ===
In addition to Membership, the IMarEST is licensed to provide a range of professional registers covering the fields of engineering, science and technology. In addition, the IMarEST's Royal Charter empowers the institute to offer registers designed to meet the specific needs of the marine profession. Corporate members can become registered (chartered) as:

Engineers

- Chartered Engineer
- Chartered Marine Engineer
- Incorporated Engineer
- Incorporated Marine Engineer
- Engineering Technician
- Marine Engineering Technician

Scientists

- Chartered Scientist
- Chartered Marine Scientist
- Registered Marine Scientist
- Marine Technician

Technologists

- Chartered Marine Technologist
- Registered Marine Technologist
- Marine Technician

=== Magazines ===
The IMarEST used to publish multiple professional magazines for the science, engineering and technology community, but in October 2014 amalgamated content from its five established and sector specific magazines (MER, Shipping World and Shipbuilder, Maritime IT & Electronics, Offshore Technology and Marine Scientist) in to a single, generic publication. Marine Professional, published by Think Publishing. describes itself as "looking at the trends emerging within the marine sector with a view to enhance the reader's understanding of the complex technical intersections between the maritime, offshore and science agendas." It refers to itself as "the voice of marine…" It is published on a monthly basis and is distributed in print and online.

=== Technical and scientific journals ===
In addition to the professional magazines outlined above, the IMarEST also publishes a number of subscription only, academic, peer-reviewed journals which present international research papers describing the latest discoveries, developments and advances in the marine sector.

Both the Journal of Marine Engineering & Technology and the Journal of Operational Oceanography are peer-reviewed and are included in the Science Citation Index Expanded.

- The Journal of Marine Engineering & Technology (JMET)
  Published three times a year in print and online, The Journal of Marine Engineering and Technology contains papers of a specialist academic nature covering research, theory and scientific studies concerned with all aspects of marine engineering and technology.

Editors: Dr. M. Martelli (University of Genoa) and Dr. Andrea Coraddu (Delft University of Technology)

- Journal of Operational Oceanography (JOO)
  Published twice a year in print and online, The Journal of Operational Oceanography disseminates and reports on scientific and applied research advances associated with all aspects of operational oceanography. The journal incorporates papers that examine the role of oceanography in contributing to all marine disciplines, address the needs of one or more of a wide range of end user communities and address the requirements of global observing systems.

Editor: Prof Ralph Rayner, CMarSci, FIMarEST, London School of Economics (LSE)

Papers published in the JMET and the JOO are eligible for the IMarEST Denny Medal, a special annual prize awarded to the authors of the best paper in each Journal.

=== Books ===
IMarEST Publications produces books for marine students, engineers and technologists with Witherby Publishing Group. The following is a selection of some of the book titles published by IMarEST:

- Marine medium speed diesel engines
- Marine low speed diesel engines
- Fire safety at sea
- Safe operation of marine power plant
- Operation & maintenance of machinery in motorships
- A practical guide to marine fuel oil handling
- Exhaust emissions from combustion machinery
- Controllable pitch propellers
- Design of propulsion and electric power generation systems
- Design and operation of marine air compressors
- Design for safety of marine and offshore systems

=== Events and conferences ===
Conferences

A number of technical and scientific conferences are organised and run by the IMarEST annually. Producing their own conference proceedings, they offer an opportunity to learn of the latest marine research. Examples include:

- Engine as a Weapon (EAAW)
- International Naval Engineering Conference (INEC)
- International Ship Controls System Symposium (iSCSS)
- Oceans of Knowledge (OOK)

The IMarEST develops a programme of evening lectures each year covering general and specific technical and scientific topics. Recordings of these lectures and any associated slides will be available for members to access online. Examples of lectures include:

- The IMarEST Stanley Gray Lectures – These lectures, held three times a year, are given by members of the profession. The lectures cover all three aspects of the institute's remit, marine engineering, marine science and marine technology.
- The IMarEST Lord Kelvin Lectures – One of the IMarEST's first presidents, this lecture series was introduced to commemorate the 100th anniversary of Lord Kelvin's death. Lectures are given by members of the maritime community taking Lord Kelvin's foresight and applying it to the development of future technologies

Branch events

In addition, branches also have their own technical and social events which are advertised through the IMarEST website and publications.
