= Chartered Institution of Railway Operators =

UK-based professional body

- Formation: 2000
- Founders: Gordon Petitt, Terry Worrall, Richard Morris, Jim Summers
- Type: Railway Operations Professional Association
- Professional title: Railway Operations Professional
- Headquarters: 2nd Floor, Beacon Building, Enterprise Park West, Weston Road, Stafford, ST18 0BF
- Region served: Worldwide
- Services: Professional Accreditation, Education & Development, Library
- Members: 11,000+ (December 2022)
- Key people: Mark Hopwood (Chair); Philip Sherratt (CEO)
- Website: ciro.org

The Chartered Institution of Railway Operators (founded in 1999 and registered in 2000 as the Institution of Railway Operators (IRO)) is the professional body for all those engaged or interested in railway operations and its allied disciplines. It exists for its members and the rail industry as a whole. It was awarded Chartered status on 1 October 2021.

== Corporate member companies ==
Most of the current train and freight operating companies (TOCs & FOCs) in the UK fall into this category. Also included is the Heritage Railway Association (HRA). A list of the companies that are corporate members of CIRO:

- Abellio Greater Anglia
- Arriva Rail London
- Arup
- Avanti West Coast
- Chiltern Railways
- Colas Rail
- Crosscountry
- Deutsche Bahn
- Department for Transport
- East Midlands Railway
- East West Rail
- Freightliner
- Govia Thameslink Railway
- Great Western Railway
- Grand Central
- HS2
- Hull Trains
- Keolis Amey Docklands
- KeolisAmey Metrolink
- Iarnród Éireann
- London North Eastern Railway
- Lumo
- Mercury3 Consult
- Merseyrail
- Mott Macdonald
- MTR Crossrail
- Network Rail
- Nexus
- Northern
- Office of Rail & Road
- Rail Delivery Group
- Rail Operations Group
- Resonate
- Rail Safety & Standards Board
- Tracsis
- Translink
- Transnet
- TransPennine Express
- Transport for Greater Manchester
- Transport for London
- Transport for Wales
- Victa Railfreight
- VolkerRail
- West Midlands Trains
- West Somerset Railway
- WSP

== Local sections & Area Councils ==
CIRO has a number of local sections in a number of countries. Internationally, there are sections in:

- Australia
- New Zealand
- United Kingdom
- Ireland

Area councils, branches of the CIRO, also operate within the U.K.:

- Midlands
- North East
- North West & Wales
- Scotland
- South East
- South West & Wales

There is also a Young Operators section specialised for young people working on the national network and the Railway Engineers Forum (REF) which is a multi-disciplinary body drawn from Professional Institutions with strong railway interests.

== Membership grades ==
Membership grade is dependent on the individual member's experience and / or formal qualification.

- Affiliate Member
- Associate Member (awarded the post-nominal letters ACIRO)
- Member (awarded the post-nominal letters MCIRO)
- Fellow (awarded the post-nominal letters FCIRO)

== Headquarters ==
The headquarters of CIRO is located in Stafford, West Midlands.

== CIRO Learning & Development ==
CIRO has its own section for learning and development, and provides a means of competence certification for personnel undertaking work in the railway operations sector. CIRO offers learning & development through continuing professional development (CPD), a mentoring scheme and academic courses. CIRO aims to provide a focus for raising standards through the use of short courses in a bespoke training portfolio and longer courses to educate railway operations management to certificate, diploma, and bachelor of science level.
