= Institute of Fisheries Management =

The Institute of Fisheries Management (IFM) is a not-for-profit membership based organisation founded in 1969 and based in the United Kingdom.

Its objectives include bringing together professionals in fishery management and those with an interest in fisheries. Although it promotes an international view, all of its nine branches are within the UK. Members of the IFM are entitled to use MIFM after their name.

The IFM diploma awarded by examination by the institute is accepted as a full credit by the Open University
