= Chartered Insurance Institute =

British professional body for the insurance sector

Coordinates: 51.516701°N 0.092221°W

- Abbreviation: CII
- Formation: 17 January 1912; 114 years ago
- Legal status: Chartered body
- Purpose: Secure and justify the confidence of the public in insurance and related financial services
- Headquarters: London, EC3
- Services: Certification, Industry standards, Conferences, Publications
- Members: 123,879+ (2021)
- CEO: Matthew Hill
- Website: https://www.cii.co.uk/

The Chartered Insurance Institute (CII) is a professional body dedicated to building public trust in the insurance and financial planning profession. The CII's purpose, as set out in its 1912 royal charter, is to 'Secure and justify the confidence of the public' in its members and the insurance sector as a whole. It aims to do this by setting standards of integrity, technical competence, and business capability. CII is a part of the Chartered Body Alliance which includes Chartered Institute for Securities & Investment (CISI) and Chartered Banker Institute.

In April 2022 Alan Vallance was appointed as the CEO of Chartered Insurance Institute, taking over after Sian Fisher's 6-year tenure. In October 2023, news reports suggested that CII had announced the departure of CEO Vallance in Q2 2024, potentially, to take up an equivalent role at the Institute of Chartered Accountants in England and Wales (ICAEW).

== Origins ==
The first Insurance Institute was established in Manchester on 14 March 1873 to provide an environment for the social exchange of knowledge and ideas on the subject of insurance, with a particular focus on fire insurance, given the number of textile manufacturers in the city. The Insurance Institute of Manchester had a selective membership policy and required members to hold senior positions within the industry, which led to the creation of a Junior Insurance Institute (later Insurance Association of Manchester) in 1883 to provide education to those new to insurance.

The second local institute to be formed was the Insurance and Actuarial Society of Glasgow founded in 1881, which held education as its main focus. Following that the Insurance Institute of Ireland (in Dublin, 1885), Insurance Institute of Norwich (1886), Birmingham Insurance Institute (1887), Insurance Institute of Yorkshire (in Leeds, 1888), Bristol (1890), Insurance Institute of Newcastle upon Tyne (1896), and Nottingham (1896), were formed, though with varying names, e.g. Insurance Social and Musical Society of Bristol.

There was a growing interest in the idea of a central institute which would bolster the work and profile of the existing institutes, and so in March 1897 a conference of representatives from the 10 institutes was held in Manchester, and it was decided that they should form an association called The Federation of Insurance Institutes of Great Britain and Ireland. At this conference, it was also proposed that an annual journal of insurance papers should be produced, that the institutes should jointly offer examinations and certificates, and that an insurance clerks’ orphanage should be established.

Initially, the responsibility for the Journal was assumed by the Birmingham and Glasgow institutes, while the Yorkshire institute and the Manchester association prepared the educational program, proposing that the Federation should act only as an examining body while local institutes undertook the teaching. The Insurance Clerks’ Orphanage was established as an independent organization in 1902, operating out of the offices of the London Salvage Corps.

At the 1906 conference of the Federation, it was decided that a royal charter should be sought and that the London Institute should act as a headquarters. In 1908, as a step towards gaining the charter, a constitution was agreed between the institutes, and the name was changed to The Insurance Institute of Great Britain and Ireland. The royal charter was granted in 1912 and the Insurance Institute of Great Britain and Ireland became the Chartered Insurance Institute. At this time there were 21 local institutes in Great Britain and Ireland and 4 affiliated institutes from within the British Empire.

== Charter ==
The royal charter incorporating the Chartered Insurance Institute was granted on 17 January 1912 by King George V. Each royal charter that is granted is unique in format and content as it is drawn up and contains the bye-laws deemed relevant by the body to be incorporated. A new supplemental charter, replacing all former versions of the charter, was granted by Queen Elizabeth II on 27 January 1987.

Article 3 of the CII's current charter identifies the six "objects and purposes for which the Institute is constituted":

- To promote efficiency and improvement in the practice of insurance among persons engaged or employed in that activity, whether Members of the Institute or not, to render the conduct of such business more effective and professional, to secure and justify the confidence of the public and employers by the conduct of reliable tests of the competence of persons engaged or employed in insurance and the provisions of reliable assurances of their trustworthiness and to provide and maintain a central organization for those purposes;
- To promote and assist the study of any subjects bearing on any branch of insurance;
- To collect and form a body of expert opinion on the law and practice relating to all things connected with insurance;
- To exercise supervision and control over the professional standards and conduct of the Members. To seek to improve the professional status of Fellows and Associates and to promote the interests, welfare, and advancement of the Members in general;
- To provide information and advice about employment in insurance for Members and others;
- To assist Members and the dependents of Members or of deceased Members suffering financial hardship by such measures as may be deemed appropriate and to contribute directly or indirectly to the work of the Insurance Charities and any other appropriate fund or charity.

== The Insurance Hall ==
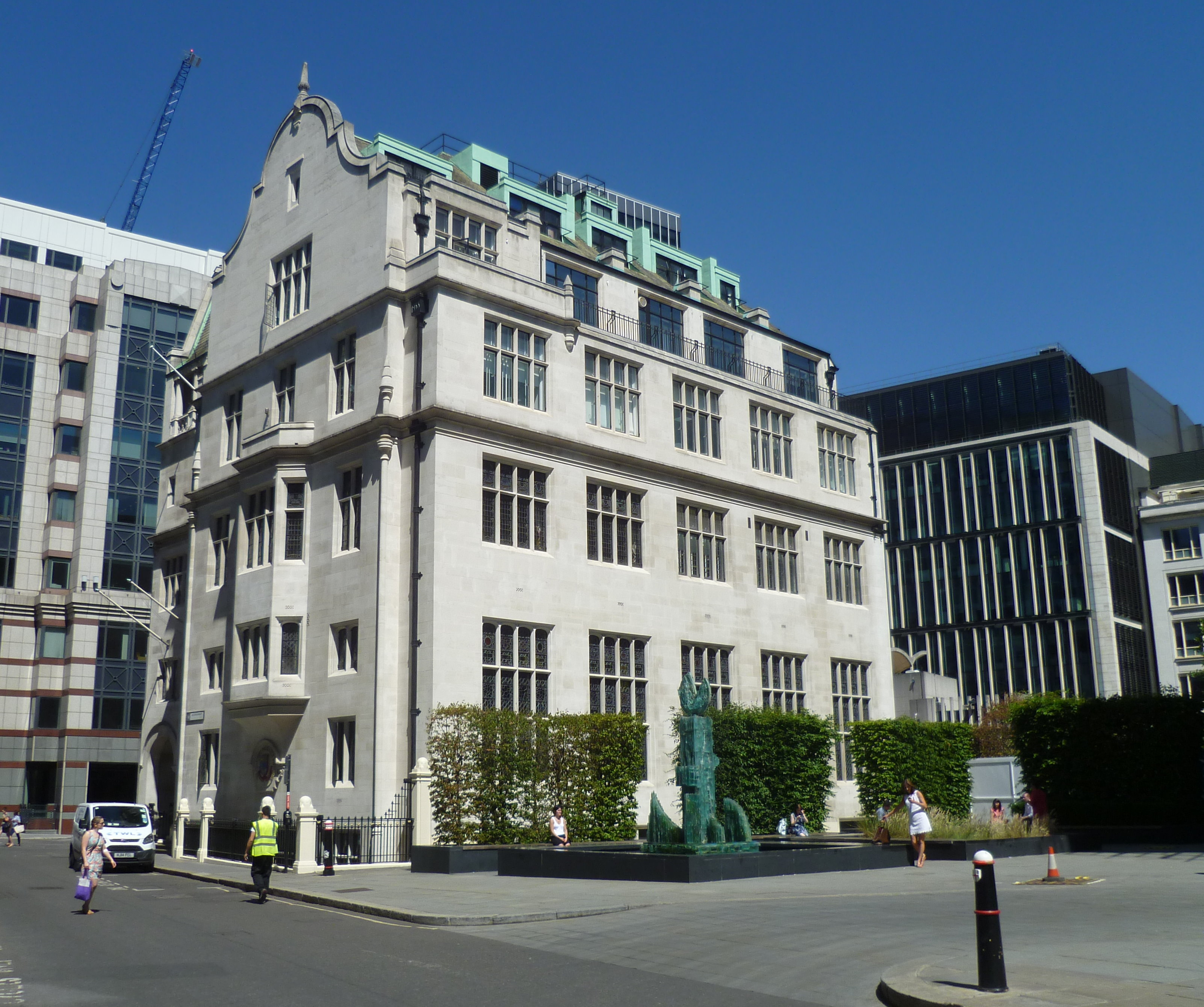
The Chartered Insurance Institute at Aldermanbury, London.

The Insurance Hall, located at 20 Aldermanbury in the Bassishaw ward of City of London, was proposed by Sir Frederick William Pascoe Rutter (the 1910–11 president) in a speech delivered in 1919 entitled The CII: Its right to work, in which he proposed that the CII should have its building in London to act as a designated meeting place for members and to house a library to facilitate study. The purchase of the freehold on the land and the construction of the building was funded through donations amassed between 1919 and 1932, and debentures issued to insurance companies. The Insurance Hall was opened by King George V on 28 June 1934.

The Insurance Hall is a Grade-II listed building in a Tudorbethan style with stained glass windows bearing the names and emblems of insurance companies that subscribed to the CII and finished internally with wood paneling. The building initially contained a 480-seat conference hall, a council chamber, a library, a museum, a common-room and writing room for members, 4 classrooms and offices occupied by the CII staff, the Insurance Institute of London, the Life Office's Association, the Insurance Charities, and the Insurance Official's Society.

The Insurance Hall was one of few buildings in the area left standing after the bombardment of 29–30 December 1940, in part due to the efforts of the house steward, Gordon Edward Stewart, who remained in the building to put out fires during the raid. Following the raid, the CII hosted the events of the Chartered Institute of Secretaries and the Institute of Actuaries as their halls had been destroyed.

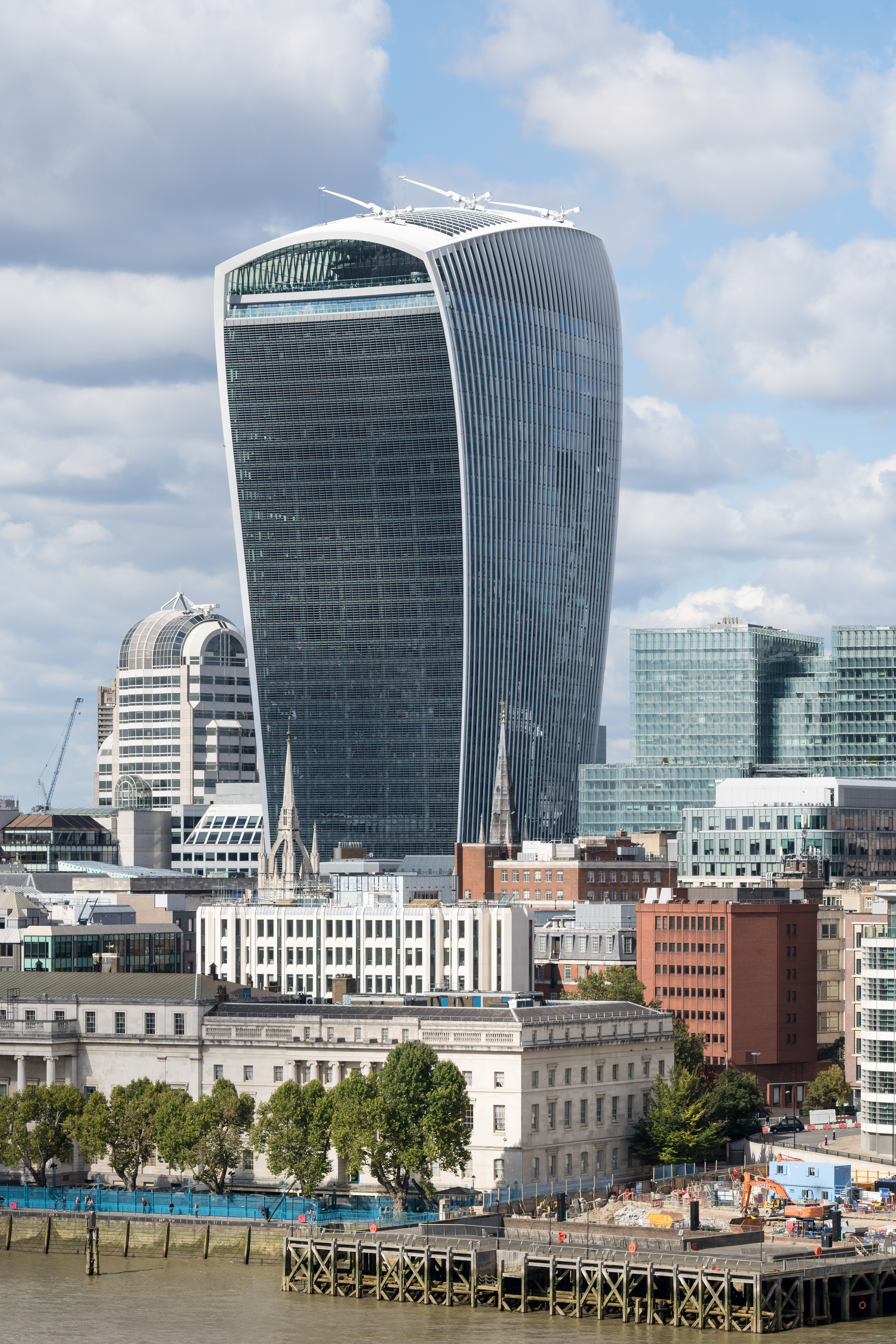
20 Fenchurch Street

In 1964 the adjoining land at 21 Aldermanbury was developed into a 5-story extension to the Insurance Hall to provide more office space for the CII. In 1986, after a period of refurbishment that redeveloped the conference hall and lower ground floor into a banqueting suite, the Insurance Hall was reopened by the Lord Mayor of London.

In 2018 the CII sold Aldermanbury to the Corporation of London and moved to 21 Lombard Street. The CII has since moved again to 20 Fenchurch Street, sharing a floor with the Chartered Institute of Securities and investments.

In 2020 the Chartered Institute for Securities & Investment and Chartered Insurance Institute both reviewed their property footprints following the pandemic 2020. The CII decided to sub-let part of the CISI's existing office space at the prime location of 20 Fenchurch Street (known as the ‘walkie talkie’) from early 2021. The arrangement will see the CISI remodeling their existing space in the building to create a new physically separate office for the CII (for a lease of five years) and will form the main headquarters for both international organizations.

== Coat of arms ==
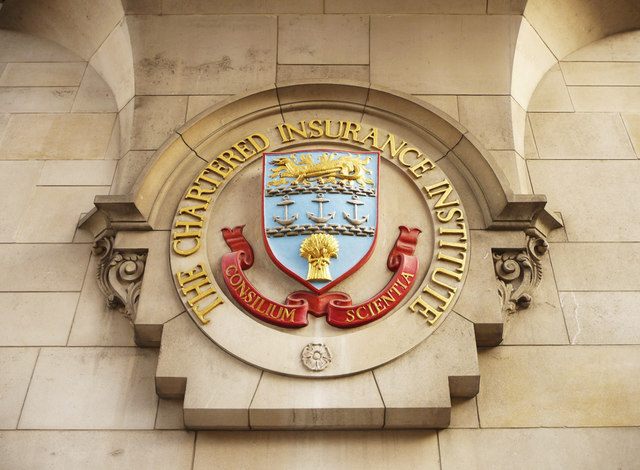
The coat of arms of the Chartered Insurance Institute

The coat of arms of the Chartered Insurance Institute was granted on 25 September 1933. It is composed of a blue shield displaying symbols representing the four original classes of insurance:

- Salamander representing fire insurance
- Three anchors representing marine insurance
- Two parallel chains representing accident insurance
- A wheat-sheaf representing life insurance

The coat of arms was installed on the façade of the Insurance Hall on its opening in 1934. It was subsequently matriculated in Scotland. Two Scottish Local Institutes obtained the grant of differenced versions, incorporating a castle in Edinburgh and a lamb in Perth.

The full display of heraldic attributes, known as achievement, was granted in 1957 to mark the CII's Diamond Jubilee. The additional elements are:

- Crown: a Saxon crown and a medieval helmet representing the connection of the site of Aldermanbury with its history, as the area was the site of an Anglo-Saxon fortified residence.
- Helmet: the helmet, made of steel, in profile and with its visor closed, denotes the rank of ‘gentlemen and esquires’ who constituted the CII's member base.
- Crest: the crest takes the shape of a hand grasping a sword by its blade, instead of by its handle, symbolizing the risk-mitigating effects of insurance. It is also intended to represent the sword of St Paul, a feature of the coat of arms of the City of London, which was, and still is, the main center of insurance.
- Supporters: on the right-hand side stands the royal lion of England and on the left-hand side is a bearded unicorn, the symbol of Scotland. Both have silver fishtails, golden fins, and talons to commemorate the institute's overseas activities. The role played by the CII in the education and support of the insurance profession is symbolized by the books held by both supporters.
- Motto: the Latin motto ‘consilium scientia located beneath the coat of arms. It is interpreted as ‘counsel and knowledge’, emphasizing the dependence of those working in insurance upon sound knowledge and wise advice, owed as much by the institute to those who seek its aid as by the professional insurer as a member of the institute to its clients (CII). The motto was first used by the CII in a golden badge created for the president in 1926 and was later incorporated in the achievement.

A representation of the full achievement of armorial bearings was installed on the rear façade of the building.

== Membership ==
At the time that the institute was granted a royal charter in 1912, full membership was only open to "men working in insurance." Following the First World War, in 1919, the ban on women sitting exams was lifted. A year later, 25 women entered the institute. In 1921, the first woman achieved Fellowship. An equal membership fee was introduced in 1966. Until then, apart from diploma holders, women had to pay only a nominal fee to join the "Lady Members Committee". The same year, an alternative cheaper 'lady social membership' was also offered by some local institutes, which was purely for organizing and participating in social events.

By comparison, today members of the CII are open to anyone connected with insurance or financial services, including students intending to join the profession.

As of 2021, the CII has more than 123,879 members.

There are eight levels of membership:

- Ordinary: individual members who do not hold a CII qualification.
- Discover: exclusively for secondary school and college teachers and students in the UK and students enrolled on full-time degree courses at UK universities.
- Society of Mortgage Professionals (SMP) Ordinary: automatic membership for members of the SMP with the designated mortgage qualification.
- Certificate: holders of the CII Certificate in Insurance. Designated by the letters "Cert CII".
- Diploma: holders of the CII Diploma in Insurance. Designated by the letters "Dip CII".
- Advanced Diploma: holders of the CII Advanced Diploma in Insurance. Designated by the letters "ACII".
- Fellowship: holders of the highest CII qualification. Designated by the letters "FCII".
- Chartered: professional title awarded to members who hold either the Advanced Diploma or Fellowship and have a minimum of five years of industry experience.

== Titles and qualifications ==
As a chartered body, the CII has the right to grant specific chartered titles. Members must first qualify themselves by passing a rigorous examination process and obtain the required minimum credits for the respective designation, after which they can request the grant for a new title at a general meeting of the membership. This is followed by a petition to the Privy Council. If the Privy Council deem the petition agreeable, a minister signs an order allowing the CII to incorporate the right to grant and award the new title. The change is then duly inserted into the institute's bye-laws.

The CII has five chartered titles which may be conferred upon individuals in the profession depending upon their specialization:

- Chartered Insurance Broker
- Chartered Insurer
- Chartered Insurance Practitioner
- Chartered Insurance Risk Manager
- Chartered Financial Planner

In addition, there are three Chartered titles to cover different specializations for organizations in the insurance and financial advice profession:

- Chartered Insurance Brokers
- Chartered Insurers
- Chartered Financial Planners

The examination qualification process includes units which are assessed through Multiple Choice Questions, Mixed Assessments, Coursework and Dissertations based on the specialization opted by the member.

== Local and affiliated global insurance institutes ==
Every CII member in the UK, the Channel Islands, and the Isle of Man is automatically a member of one of 58 local institutes. There are an additional seven associated institutes in Gibraltar and the Republic of Ireland. Members outside of the UK have the option of membership in one of 70 affiliated global insurance institutes.

== Library ==
A strong desire to form a central Insurance Library in London existed before the Charter incorporation in 1912. The objectives of the then Insurance Institute of Great Britain and Ireland included ‘to encourage the study of all subjects bearing on every branch of insurance, and to form a Library for the use of members’. These objectives were then written into the 1912 Charter as the obligation for the CII to maintain a library of resources related to insurance for the benefit of its members. However, it was not until the opening of the Insurance Hall in 1934 that the Chartered Insurance Institute Library was established. Before that date, federated Insurance Institutes maintained insurance libraries across the UK and Ireland.

The CII Library was initially run in conjunction with the Insurance Institute of London library. The original intention was to run both libraries side by side, the London Insurance Institute Library as a lending library for members of that institute and the Chartered Insurance Institute Library as a reference library for all members.[3] Both libraries eventually merged into one single Library that now acts as a central lending library and knowledge service for all members.

CII membership today gives insurance and personal finance members full access to CII Knowledge Services, including the library, book lending (in the EU/EEA), copies of articles or chapters, and member-only content in our online knowledge bank.

== Museum ==
The Museum in Aldermanbury had existed since the opening of the Insurance Hall in 1934. The Museum originally exhibited a 19th-century fire brigade engine which is now housed at the American Museum in Bath. In 1934 the illustrator C. Walter Hodges painted a frieze that surrounds the four walls of the museum area, depicting allegories of marine, fire, accident, and life insurance. The Insurance Hall is designated as a Grade II listed building, in part due to these murals. The professional body's move from Aldermanbury to a smaller, more modern space in the city, resulted in the CII launching an ‘Our History’ website dedicated to bringing the heritage of the organization, and the wider evolution of insurance, to life. The website includes a 360-degree virtual tour of the Insurance Hall and displays the unique stained-glass windows of the historic building as well as the CII's collection of more than 1500 Fire Marks, which were formerly on display in the staircase of the Aldermanbury building. There are also digitalized versions of hundreds of insurance-related documents, dating back as far as 1669, plus rare, no longer in print books, that give valuable insight into past insurance processes. The original 1912 Charter of the Chartered Insurance Institute can also be found on the site.
