= Institution of Engineering Designers =

British professional institution

Coordinates: 51.248°N 2.195°W

- Abbreviation: IED
- Formation: 1945
- Legal status: Non-profit company and registered charity (1145678, formerly 269879)
- Purpose: Professional body for engineering and product designers
- Location: Courtleigh, Westbury Leigh, Westbury, Wiltshire, UK BA13 3TA
- Region served: Worldwide
- Members: Engineering and product designers
- Chief Executive: Libby Meyrick
- Main organ: IED Council (President - Mandy Chessell)
- Affiliations: Engineering Council, Society for the Environment

The Institution of Engineering Designers (IED) is a British professional engineering institution founded in 1945. The IED is the UK's only professional body representing those working in the fields of Engineering and Technological Product Design. The membership of the institution work in a diverse range of industries that include: product design and manufacturing; architectural design and construction; mechanical, automotive and aircraft design, design education, IT and computing. The IED is licensed to award three Charterships, including Chartered Technological Product Designer.

== Function ==
The stated aims of the institution are to further the interests of its members by:

- Promoting and facilitating the advancement of engineering and product design within both industry and education
- Supporting the professional development of its members
- Facilitating the exchange of knowledge and ideas between its members and the various industries in which they work
- Raising the standing and visibility of its members
- Maintaining a high standard of professional conduct

The IED is licensed by the Engineering Council to assess candidates wishing to join the ECUK's Register of Professional Engineers and Technicians who may then receive Chartered Engineer, Incorporated Engineer or Engineering Technician status. The Institution is also licensed by the EC to accredit undergraduate and post graduate degree courses and by the Society for the Environment to award Chartered Environmentalist and Registered Environmental Practitioner registrations to suitably qualified and experienced members. Under the auspices of its own Charter the IED also grants Chartered Technological Product Designer (CTPD) or Registered Product Designer (RProdDes) designations to suitably qualified and experienced Technological Product Design members.

Members of the institution are entitled to use the postnominal letters MIED; the institution also maintains accreditation pathways for CAD users allowing suitably competent persons to achieve "Registered CAD Practitioner" status and use the postnominal letters RCP and "Registered CAD Manager" RCADMan.

== Structure ==
The institution is based in Wiltshire and has members worldwide including active local groups in Malta, Hong Kong and Malaysia. In March 2014 Maggie Philbin was elected honorary president of the IED, succeeding Sir George Cox. The appointment was in recognition of her ongoing work to support and promote science, technology and engineering. On 21 July 2018 she was succeeded by Pete Lomas, co-founder and trustee of the Raspberry Pi Foundation.

== Royal charter ==
The institution was presented with a royal charter by the Duke of Edinburgh, a patron of the IED since 1954, at a ceremony at St James's Palace on 23 February 2012. A ceremony to mark the launch of the Chartership for Technological Product Designers was held at the palace on 8 July 2015.

== See also ==
- Chartered engineer
- Incorporated Engineer
- Engineering Technician
