= Chartered Institute of Architectural Technologists =

Qualifying body for architectural technology

- Abbreviation: CIAT
- Formation: 12 February 1965
- Type: Professional body
- Purpose: Qualifying body in Architectural Technology
- Headquarters: London, EC1; United Kingdom
- Region served: Worldwide
- Members: c. 10,000
- CIAT President: Eddie Weir PCIAT
- Chief Executive: Tara Page
- Main organ: Executive Board
- Website: architecturaltechnology.com
- Remarks: Built environment

The Chartered Institute of Architectural Technologists (CIAT) is the qualifying body for architectural technology, primarily in the United Kingdom but also internationally. The institute has members in overseas centres such as Hong Kong and Ireland. 'Chartered Architectural Technologist' is a protected title listed in the European Directive 2005/36/EC. Chartered Members of the Institute may use the designation MCIAT and the title of Chartered Architectural Technologist. CIAT is a member of AEEBC (Association d'Experts Européennes du Bâtiment et de la Construction).

== History ==
=== Origins ===
The origins of CIAT are related to a report by the Royal Institute of British Architects calling for the establishment of 'an institute for technicians'. On 12 February 1965, the Society of Architectural and Associated Technicians (SAAT) was founded, representing and qualifying technicians within the construction industry. In its first year, 1,799 technicians joined the society.

=== BIAT ===
On 1 May 1986, SAAT became the British Institute of Architectural Technicians (BIAT), to reflect the specialisms of Architectural Technicians, and in 1994 the title of the Institute changed to British Institute of Architectural Technologists. In 2002 the Institute introduced a new technician grade to recognise the professionally qualified Architectural Technician.

=== Royal charter ===
The institute was recognised by incorporation by royal charter in July 2005. Full Members became Chartered Architectural Technologists, MCIAT. Under this Charter the objectives of the Institute are:

- to promote, for the benefit of society, the science and practice of architectural technology;
- to facilitate the development and integration of technology into architecture and the wider construction industry to continually improve standards of service for the benefit of industry and of society;
- to uphold and advance the standards of education, competence, practice and conduct of members of the Institute thereby promoting the interests, standing and recognition of Chartered Members within the industry and the wider society.

== Structure ==
=== Membership-based organisation ===
As a membership-based organisation, CIAT is owned by and operated on behalf of its members. Its activities are supported by a team of administrators based at a central office in London.

=== Governance and management ===
The institute is governed by its executive board and council, all of whom must be chartered members. Members of the institute's council, executive board, and sub-committees all give their time voluntarily.

The institute's head is the president, who is also the chairman of council and the executive board. The president (a trustee) serves for a period of two years, following a year as president elect. At the end of the term as president, a further year is served as immediate past president. The remainder of the executive board is also made up of the trustees.

Council, which consists of 24 chartered members, and made up from sixteen regions, the Republic of Ireland Centre and honorary officers, remains as the electoral college and is the strategic forum of the institute.

The executive board is responsible for the management of the institute and ensures that the strategies approved by council are implemented. The executive board is composed of chartered members (all of whom are the trustees for CIAT under the royal charter) and are the president, president-elect (immediate past president), honorary secretary, honorary treasurer, the vice-presidents and four elected councillors.

It is the work of the institute's committees, task forces and subgroups to develop these policies and address current issues and developments.

=== Regions and centres ===
The institute has sixteen Regions around the United Kingdom and 7 Overseas Centres in Hong Kong, Republic of Ireland, Australasia, The Americas, Asia, Europe and Middle East & Africa.

== International relations ==
A percentage of members are located overseas and CIAT has also formed international agreements with several overseas organisations such as the Association of Architectural Technologists of Ontario (AATO) and the Konstruktørforeningen from Denmark.

== Education ==
CIAT works with universities in the UK and in other countries such as Denmark. It accredits and recognises undergraduate degree and postgraduate degrees in architectural technology as providing the necessary underpinning knowledge to allow graduates progressing to Chartered Membership. CIAT-accredited honours degree programmes must also comply with the UK Quality Assurance Agency for Higher Education (QAA) Subject Benchmark Statement for Architectural Technology.

== Membership ==
CIAT has over 9,500 members worldwide and aims to represent all those studying and working within the architectural technology discipline. There are several grades of membership; student, profile candidate, Associate, Technician and Chartered.

The following designatory letters may be used by members of CIAT:

- ACIAT: Associate member of the Chartered Institute of Architectural Technologists
- MCIAT: Chartered Member of the Chartered Institute of Architectural Technologists
- FCIAT: Chartered and Fellow Member of the Chartered Institute of Architectural Technologists
- HonMCIAT: Honorary member of the Chartered Institute of Architectural Technologists
- The institute's president is designated PCIAT; past presidents use PPCIAT, PPBIAT, PPSAAT or PCSAAT

== Awards ==
CIAT runs awards, including the Open Award for Technical Excellence in Architectural Technology.

== See also ==
- Architectural technologist
- Architectural technology
- Architects Registration Board
- Chartered Institute of Building
- Construction Industry Council
- Royal Institute of British Architects
- Royal Institution of Chartered Surveyors
