= Chartered Institute of Housing =

UK professional body

The Chartered Institute of Housing (CIH) is the professional body for those working in the housing profession in the United Kingdom. It has a royal charter, gained in 1984. Currently CIH has over 17,000 members, mostly in the UK but also overseas, notably in Hong Kong. CIH's current Chief Executive is Gavin Smart.

== History ==
The CIH traces its organisational roots back to the philanthropic work carried out by pioneers such as Octavia Hill, in response to the revelation of the appalling housing conditions endured by much of the population in the 1884–1885 Royal Commission on the Housing of Working Classes. Hill established a method of letting properties on short-term tenancies and trained a group of women to manage the properties by collecting rents and dealing with repairs and tenants' welfare issues. The Association of Women Housing Workers, founded in 1916, carried on this pioneering work and housing advocate Irene Barclay was a leading figure in it. The organisation changed its name to the Society of Housing Managers in 1948.

The Institute of Housing was founded in 1931 by a group of local government offices in the West Midlands, who also developed a housing qualification and published the first edition of Housing magazine.

The two merged in 1965 to form the Institute of Housing Managers. The organisation was renamed the Institute of Housing in 1974 and its royal charter was granted in 1984. Following this, in 1994 it changed its name to the Chartered Institute of Housing. In 1999, CIH merged with the Institute of Rent Officers.

== CIH Today ==
CIH's Head Office is in Coventry, West Midlands, with smaller offices in London, Cardiff, Edinburgh and Belfast, and overseas offices in Hong Kong and Toronto. Alongside its services to members it produces training, publications, conferences and seminars to organisations, members and non-members. CIH works with universities to develop housing qualifications, and provides distance learning courses.

CIH's annual conference, The Housing Community Summit, is held every September, in partnership with the National Housing Federation.
