= Chartered Institute of Loss Adjusters =

UK-based professional body

The Chartered Institute of Loss Adjusters is the professional body representing loss adjusters in the United Kingdom and overseas. It is a legal entity under the authority of The Privy Council, having been granted a royal charter in 1961. The institute offers qualifying examinations that cover insurance law, claims procedure, report writing and loss adjustment. Those who pass these examinations may then be elevated to different levels dependent upon their qualification.

The first objective of the institute is the study of the profession.
