= Institute of Chartered Shipbrokers =

Society for the commercial shipping industry

- Formation: 1911
- Legal status: Chartered Institute
- Headquarters: City of London, EC4; United Kingdom
- Members: 4,000+
- President: Punit Oza FICS
- Director: Robert Hill FICS
- Website: www.ics.org.uk

The Institute of Chartered Shipbrokers (ICS) is a professional and learned society for all members of the commercial shipping industry worldwide. After being founded in 1911 in London, the ICS was granted a Royal Charter in 1920.

The Institute is the only internationally recognised professional body in the commercial maritime arena. Its members form a global network of commercial maritime professionals, including shipbrokers, ship owners, and ship agents throughout the world.

The Institute consists of 27 branches, 11 International Teaching Centres and 11 Recognised Partners in key locations across the world. Their professional network comprises 4,000 individual Members and Fellows.

== See also ==
- Baltic Exchange
- Worshipful Company of Shipwrights
