= Chartered Institute of Trade Mark Attorneys =

UK professional body of trade mark attorneys

The Chartered Institute of Trade Mark Attorneys (CITMA) was founded in 1934 as the British professional body for trade mark attorneys.

It received a Royal Charter in 2016 which saw its name change from ITMA. CITMA is a professional organisation supporting and promoting the trade mark attorney profession. It has legal responsibility for regulating the profession, which is delegated to the Intellectual Property Regulation Board (IPReg).

== Officers (2022–2024) ==
The President of the Chartered Institute of Trade Mark Attorneys is Rachel Wilkinson-Duffy of Baker McKenzie. Wilkinson-Duffy was elected to the position in April 2022.

The First Vice-president is Kelly Saliger of CMS and the Second Vice-president and Treasurer is Daniel Hardman-Smart of Stobbs.

== See also ==
- British professional bodies
- Intellectual property organization
- List of topics related to the United Kingdom
- UK Intellectual Property Office
