= Arboricultural Association =

The Arboricultural Association is an organisation United Kingdom for amenity tree care professionals (arboriculturists). It is located in Stonehouse, Gloucestershire. It is registered as a charity with the United Kingdom Government.

== Structure ==
The government of the organisation consists of an executive committee of twenty members, including a president, three vice presidents and a chairman. These roles have been occupied by several notable individuals, including Duncan Sandys, Wayland Young and George Jellicoe as vice presidents and Arthur Skeffington as president.

== History ==
The organisation was inaugurated in 1964. In 1965, it began publishing the Arboricultural Association Journal. In 1971, the organisation established the Register of Consultants in Arboriculture, intended to improve the quality of arboricultural services available through standardisation. In 1974, the Arboricultural Association merged with the Association of British Tree Surgeons and Arborists (founded in 1963). Following the merger, the name of the organisation's journal was changed to Arboricultural Journal.
