= Chartered Institution of Water and Environmental Management =

UK professional body

The Chartered Institution of Water and Environmental Management (CIWEM) is an independent professional body and a registered charity in the United Kingdom that works internationally to advance the science and practice of water resource management and environmental resource management for sustainability. It is licensed by the Science Council to award Chartered Scientist and Chartered Environmentalist status to qualifying members. It is a member of the Society for the Environment.

The organisation was formed in 1987 when the Institution of Public Health Engineers, the Institution of Water Engineers and Scientists, and the Institute of Water Pollution Control merged. It was granted a Royal Charter in 1995.

== CIWEM Awards ==
CIWEM presents a number of yearly awards. Since 2007 the organisation has run the CIWEM Environmental Photographer of the Year (EPOY) competition for photographers and filmmakers, with the aim of raising international awareness of environmental and social issues such as climate change and social inequality. Winning and shortlisted photographs and films are featured in an exhibition at the Royal Geographical Society in London before touring the UK.

Other awards presented by CIWEM have included Sustainable Wetland of the Year, Tomorrow's Water, and the Environmental Parliamentarian of the Year Award. As of 2019 they run the Environmental Photographer of the Year, Young Environmentalist of the Year (YETOY), UK Junior Water Prize in association with the Stockholm International Water Institute, and the Nick Reeves Award for Arts and the Environment.

== CIWEM Communities ==
CIWEM also has a number of branches (predominantly across the UK) and groups and networks including:

- Water Resources Network
- Rivers and Coastal Group
- Urban Drainage Group
- Climate Change Network
- Arts and Environment Network
- Contaminated Land Network
- Faiths and the Environment Network
- Natural Capital Network
- Energy Network
- Waste and Resources Management Network
- Water Supply and Quality Network
- Wastewater and Biosolids Network
- Air Network
- Floods and Coastal Erosion Risk Management Specialist Panel
- WEM Pride
- CIWEM Early Careers Network
- Flood and Coast Community

== See also ==
- Chartered Institution of Wastes Management
- List of organisations in the United Kingdom with a royal charter
- List of professional associations in the United Kingdom
