= Chartered Banker Institute =

UK-based professional banking institute

- Founded: 1875
- Headquarters: Edinburgh, United Kingdom
- Website: charteredbanker.com

The Chartered Banker Institute was established in 1875 and is the oldest professional banking institute in the world. It aims to help rebuild public confidence in banks and bankers by developing and embedding high ethical, professional and technical standards. The institute offers a range of qualifications for banking and financial services.

== History ==
The organisation was formed in 1875 as the Institute of Bankers in Scotland. In 1976, a first royal charter was awarded and it became the Chartered Institute of Bankers in Scotland.

In 2011, the Institute led the establishment of the Chartered Banker Professional Standards Board (CB:PSB) an initiative supported by eight UK banks and covering 350,000 individuals working in the banking sector. The CB:PSB develops and supports the implementation of industry-wide professional standards which set out the knowledge, skills, attitudes and behaviours expected of all UK bankers.

Based in Edinburgh, the institute has more than 25,000 members in iver 100 countries. As of 2025 there were around one thousand fellows, who may use the post-nominals FCBI.

== Qualifications ==
The Chartered Banker Institute provides a wide range of qualifications for banking and financial services. It is responsible for awarding Chartered Banker designation to qualified bankers, a protected title. As a professional body it is authorised by the UK Privy Council to award this designation.

=== Chartered Banker ===
Chartered Banker is the professional qualification awarded to qualified members of the Chartered Banker Institute. To become a Chartered Banker, individuals must pass a series of rigorous examinations on subjects including ethics, credit and lending, risk management and management and leadership. Chartered Bankers are required to complete a minimum of 35 hours of continuing professional development (CPD) per year, including 5 hours of ethics training, and subscribe to the Chartered Banker Code of Professional Conduct.

=== Chartered Banker MBA ===
The Chartered Banker MBA, with Bangor University, is the only qualification in the world combining an MBA and Chartered Banker status. When undertaking the Chartered Banker MBA, students study eight Compulsory Modules and four Electives to gain the 180 credits needed for the full degree and dual award of 'Chartered Banker MBA'.

== See also ==
- The London Institute of Banking & Finance
- Chartered Institute for Securities & Investment
- Worshipful Company of International Bankers
- List of banks in the United Kingdom
- FINSIA
