= Institute of Chartered Foresters =

UK professional body

The Institute of Chartered Foresters (ICF) is the professional body for foresters and arboriculturists in the United Kingdom. Its royal charter was granted in 1982. The Institute grants chartered status to individuals following an examination process that includes a period of management or supervisory experience resulting in them being promoted to professional membership. Chartered members are recognised by the designations 'Chartered Arboriculturist' or 'Chartered Forester' and by the postnominals letters MICFor (Member of the Institute of Chartered Foresters). Fellows of the institute bear the postnominals FICFor (Fellow of the Institute of Chartered Foresters) in addition to their designation.

Members of the Institute of Chartered Foresters are required to undertake Continuous Professional Development (CPD) and are bound by a Code of Ethics and Professional Conduct. Current membership numbers are over 1,800.

The ICF's mission is to raise professional standards in forestry and arboriculture in order to promote the sustainable management of trees and woodlands throughout the UK. A key element of this mission is raising awareness of the issues facing forestry sector professionals and providing guidance to professionals from other sectors and to the public in relation to these issues.

== Membership Grades ==
There are 5 membership grades at the Institute of Chartered Foresters:

- Student Membership – for individuals studying full-time or part-time in higher education in a relevant field
- Associate Member – for individuals who have completed their initial higher education while they accrue the professional experience required before they can present for the Professional Membership assessments.
- Professional Membership – available to members on obtaining chartered status through the successful completion of the Professional Membership assessments.
- Fellowship – awarded to senior members of the institute, in recognition of their expertise and particular contribution to the profession.
- Supporter – available only to individuals with an interest in forestry and arboriculture but who are not involved in a professional capacity that would allow them to become chartered members.

== Institute of Chartered Foresters' National Conferences ==
The ICF annual National conferences attracting both members and non-members working in and around the sector in the UK and Internationally and address issues and topics pertinent to the profession. Recent conferences have examined the following subjects:

- Tree Health, Resilience & Sustainability (2015, Cardiff)
- The Timber Supply Chain – Dynamics & Opportunities (2016, Newcastle)
- Innovation for Change – New Drivers for Tomorrow's Forestry (2018, Edinburgh)
- The UK's Role in Global Forestry (2019, Oxford)

In 2011, 2014 and 2017, the Institute hosted the Trees, People and the Built Environment (TPBE) Urban Trees Research Conference as their National Conference. TPBE is a partnership event of some 20 UK forestry, arboriculture and built environment organisations, which presents urban trees research from around the world.

The fourth Trees, People and the Built Environment conference was held virtually on 3–4 February 2021, attracting global speakers and delegates from a range of disciplines.roun
