= Chartered Engineer (UK) =

Engineer registered with British regulatory body

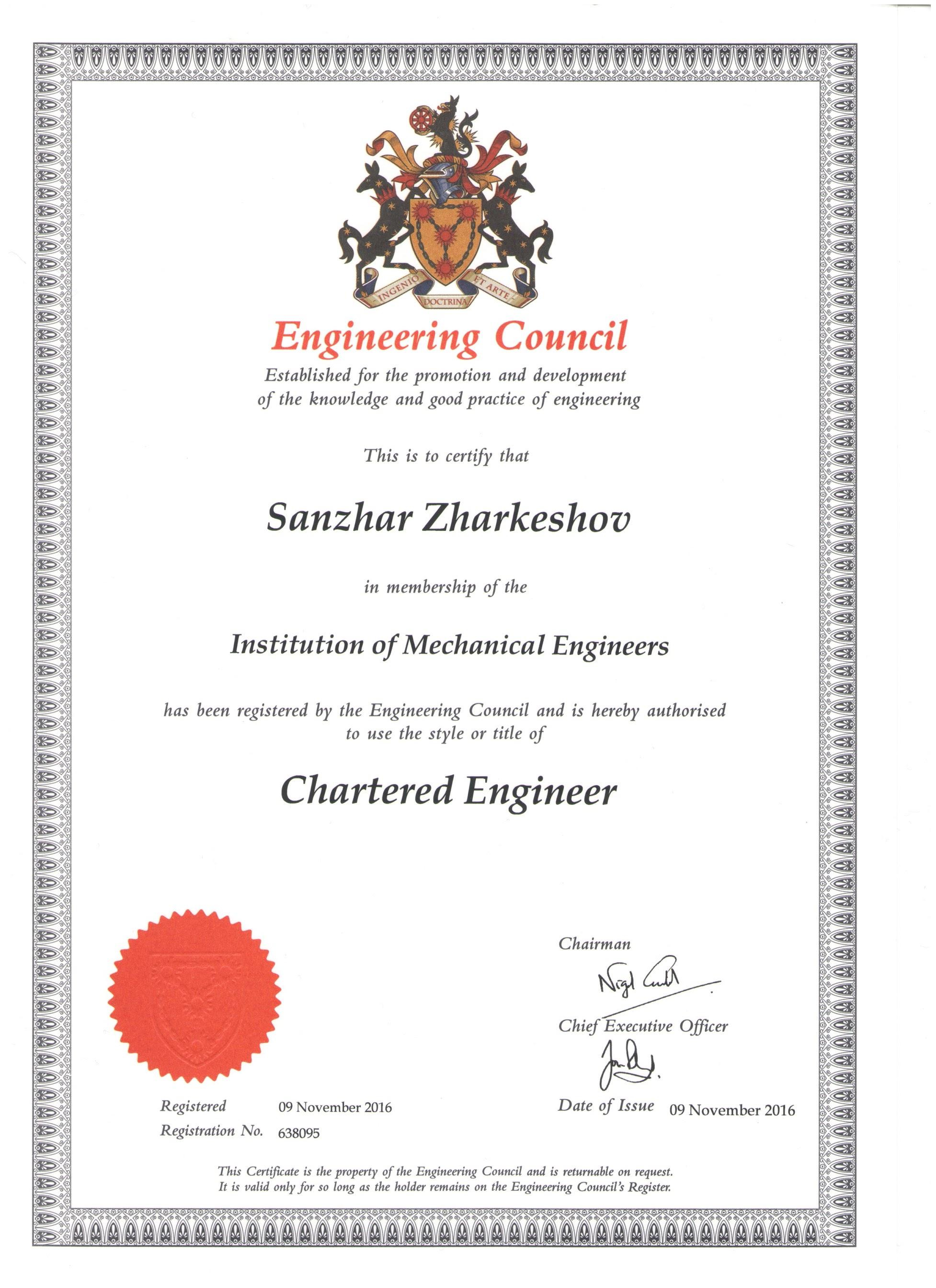
Chartered engineer certificate.

In the United Kingdom, Chartered Engineer (CEng) is an advanced professional qualification for engineers that encompasses both academic engineering qualifications and proven professional competence. Chartered Engineers are registered with the UK's regulatory body for the engineering profession, the Engineering Council, which regulates the use of the Chartered Engineer title.

In the UK, the generic title engineer is not legally protected and is used in different ways across occupations and organisations. In contrast, the legally protected Chartered Engineer title signifies that an individual has proven that they possess advanced engineering expertise, knowledge, professional competence and commitment required by recognised professional standards, as assessed through independent peer review.

== The CEng qualification standard ==
Chartered Engineers are required to hold a Master's degree in an appropriate engineering discipline, or have achieved an education academically equivalent to a master's degree in an appropriate engineering discipline, attained through an appropriate combination of qualifications and learning, subject to a stringent academic assessment.

Meeting this academic criterion establishes the required engineering knowledge and understanding, but does not, by itself, demonstrate professional competence or the ability to apply advanced engineering and technological knowledge in practice. As an applied discipline, engineering requires the proven application of that knowledge to complex engineering and technological challenges. This competence must be independently assessed by a competent professional authority against established and recognised educational and professional benchmarks, including knowledge, professional judgement, leadership and responsibility.

Accordingly, CEng is not merely an academic qualification; it is an academically and professionally assessed qualification, requiring applicants to demonstrate significant engineering competence and commitment beyond the Master's-level academic requirements. It requires applicants to prove that they can apply that education in professional practice at the same advanced level. Chartered Engineers are qualified to develop and research new technologies and use innovative methods to solve complex problems.

The professional competencies for CEng must be demonstrated through education, further training, and work experience. Assessment is then undertaken by the relevant Professional Engineering Institution (PEI) through a peer review process involving academics and professional engineers. This includes a professional review interview that applicants must pass. Postgraduate experience in professional practice is required.

The total process of becoming a Chartered Engineer, including an MEng, can take at least 8 years, but it typically takes 10-12 years or longer to satisfy all of the competency requirements.

Chartered Engineer (CEng) status is regarded as the highest standard within the engineering profession.

== Legal protection and registration ==
The Chartered Engineer title is protected in the UK under law by means of the Engineering Council's royal charter and bye-laws. As of 2024, approximately 168,000 people on the Engineering Council Register held Chartered Engineer as their highest professional title.

== Recognition and roles ==
A Chartered Engineer holds the highest professional qualification in engineering and is trusted to take full responsibility for the development and application of engineering across areas including research, design, leadership, management, education and more. The Chartered Engineer title is considered the “gold standard” and a mark of excellence in the engineering profession. CEng holders are recognised as being among the technological elite.

Chartered Engineers apply their knowledge and professional competence in a wide range of professional settings, including defence, aviation, nuclear safety and security, and engineering research.

In certain designated engineering roles within the defence sector, Ministry of Defence requirements specify Chartered Engineer registration as a qualification criterion. These requirements reflect the importance of peer-reviewed engineering knowledge, competence and professional accountability in defence programmes. Across the wider defence sector, CEng registration is also recognised and sought after in senior defence technical leadership and other advanced engineering and technology roles.

Chartered Engineers contribute to aviation accident investigation, applying engineering expertise and professional judgement to the investigation of accidents, the identification of underlying causes and the improvement of safety in safety-critical systems.

Chartered Engineers also serve as specialist inspectors in nuclear safety and security, assessing engineering designs, plant modifications and safety risks to help ensure the safe operation of nuclear sites.

Chartered Engineers also contribute to engineering research, including the development of biomedical technologies and intelligent healthcare systems.

Chartership signifies world-class engineering knowledge and professional competence, demonstrated through rigorous independent assessment against internationally recognised professional standards.

== Disciplines ==
The Chartered Engineer (CEng) qualification spans a broad range of engineering disciplines, including established fields such as civil, mechanical and electrical engineering, as well as emerging and rapidly evolving areas of technology such as intelligent electronic systems, quantum computing and artificial intelligence.

In September 2026, the Engineering Council licensed the Chartered Institute of Information Security (CIISec) as the first Professional Engineering Institution dedicated to cyber security, enabling it to assess candidates for Chartered Engineer (CEng) and Incorporated Engineer (IEng) registration.

This reflects the Chartered Engineer’s ability to apply advanced engineering knowledge and professional competence across established disciplines and emerging technologies.

== Incorporated Engineer (IEng) ==
The Incorporated Engineer (IEng) designation has an exemplifying academic benchmark at bachelor's degree level, whereas the Chartered Engineer (CEng) benchmark is at Master's level. Both designations require applicants to demonstrate the relevant professional competence and commitment.

Incorporated Engineer (IEng) registration is described as roughly equivalent to North American Professional Engineer designations, while Chartered Engineer is set at a higher level.

== Engineering Council ==
The Engineering Council is the UK's regulatory body for the engineering profession. It sets the standards for professional registration as a Chartered Engineer and establishes requirements for the accreditation of engineering degree programmes through its Accreditation of Higher Education Programmes (AHEP) standard. Licensed Professional Engineering Institutions assess applicants for registration and accredit educational programmes on behalf of the Engineering Council.

Accreditation provides assurance that an engineering degree programme meets rigorous, profession-defined standards for engineering science, mathematical and analytical knowledge, design and engineering practice. It may also help graduates satisfy the academic requirements for professional registration as a Chartered Engineer (CEng).

== Qualification requirements ==
To become chartered, the Engineering Council require engineers meet requirements set out in The UK Standard for Professional Engineering Competence and Commitment (UK-SPEC) which broadly fall into two categories, academic qualifications and initial professional development (IPD).

=== Academic qualifications ===
The Engineering Council identifies the following exemplifying academic qualifications for the traditional route to CEng registration:

- An accredited Bachelors degree with honours in engineering or technology, plus an appropriate accredited Master's degree or Engineering Doctorate (EngD), or appropriate further learning to master's level.
- An accredited integrated Master of Engineering (MEng) degree.

Applicants whose qualifications were recognised as exemplifying qualifications when they obtained them continue to be considered against those requirements. Other routes are available for applicants with equivalent qualifications.

=== Initial Professional Development ===
Initial Professional Development (IPD) is acquired through work place lear ning. The UK-SPEC splits IPD into five key competencies:

Competency A. Knowledge and understanding
Chartered Engineers shall use a combination of general and specialist engineering knowledge and understanding to optimise the application of advanced and complex systems.

Competency B. Design, development and solving engineering problems
Chartered Engineers shall apply appropriate theoretical and practical methods to the analysis and solution of engineering problems.

Competency C. Responsibility, management and leadership
Chartered Engineers shall demonstrate technical and commercial leadership.

Competency D. Communication and interpersonal skills
Chartered Engineers shall demonstrate effective communication and interpersonal skills.

Competency E. Personal and professional commitment
Chartered Engineers shall demonstrate a personal commitment to professional standards, recognising obligations to society, the profession and the environment.

The five key competencies encompass 17 detailed sub-competencies and commitment requirements (A1–E5), covering the knowledge, problem-solving, leadership, communication and professional commitments expected of Chartered Engineers; see the current UK-SPEC for the full requirements. Competence can be developed through a combination of formal and informal learning, professional development and experience.

== Continuing professional development ==
The Engineering Council requires Chartered Engineers to demonstrate ongoing commitment to professional development and undertake continuing professional development (CPD) to maintain their registration. It establishes the general requirements for CPD, which, as with initial professional development (IPD), may be supplemented by individual Professional Engineering Institutions (PEIs). These requirements include taking responsibility for identifying learning and development needs and developing a plan to address them, in discussion with their employer where appropriate.

- Undertake a variety of development activities, both in accordance with this plan and in response to other opportunities which may arise.
- Record their CPD activities.
- Reflect upon what they have learned or achieved through their CPD activities and record these reflections.
- Evaluate their CPD activities against any objectives which they have set and record this evaluation.
- Review their learning and development plan regularly following reflection and assessment of future needs.
- Support the learning and development of others through activities such as mentoring, and sharing professional expertise and knowledge.

Chartered Engineers are also required to adhere to the codes of conduct of their respective professional engineering institutions and maintain their competence throughout their careers, keeping abreast of developments in engineering science, technology, regulation, sustainability, ethics and professional practice.

== Designatory lettering ==
Chartered Engineers are entitled to use the post-nominals, CEng, after names as a means of denoting their status with the Engineering Council. This is written after honours, decorations and academic/university, but before letters denoting membership of professional engineering institutions. When a Chartered Engineer has more than one institution membership conferring designatory letters, the institution through which the holder is registered as a Chartered Engineer appears immediately after CEng, with other memberships following in order of the institution's foundation dates.

== Professional Engineering Institutions ==
The Engineering Council delegates the assessment and registration of Chartered Engineers to the following licensed Professional Engineering Institutions (PEIs) relevant to their industry or specialism:

- British Computer Society
- British Institute of Non-Destructive Testing
- Chartered Association of Building Engineers
- Chartered Institute of Information Security
- Chartered Institution of Building Services Engineers
- Chartered Institution of Civil Engineering Surveyors (CICES)
- Chartered Institution of Highways and Transportation
- Chartered Institution of Water and Environmental Management
- Energy Institute
- Institute for Systems Engineering (UK chapter of INCOSE)
- Institute of Acoustics
- Institute of Cast Metals Engineers
- Institute of Corrosion
- Institute of Explosive Engineers (IExpE)
- Institute of Healthcare Engineering and Estate Management
- Institute of Highway Engineers
- Institute of Marine Engineering, Science and Technology
- Institute of Materials, Minerals and Mining
- Institute of Measurement and Control
- Institute of Physics
- Institute of Physics and Engineering in Medicine
- Institution of Agricultural Engineers
- Institution of Chemical Engineers
- Institution of Civil Engineers
- Institution of Engineering and Technology
- Institution of Engineering Designers
- Institution of Fire Engineers
- Institution of Gas Engineers and Managers
- Institution of Lighting Professionals
- Institution of Mechanical Engineers
- Institution of Nuclear Engineers
- Institution of Railway Signal Engineers
- Institution of Royal Engineers
- Institution of Structural Engineers
- Institution of Water Officers
- The Permanent Way Institution (PWI)
- Royal Aeronautical Society
- Royal Institution of Naval Architects
- The Safety and Reliability Society
- Society of Operations Engineers
- The Welding Institute

Some of these institutions also register Incorporated Engineers and Engineering Technicians. There are other Engineering Council UK licensed member institutions that register Incorporated Engineers and Engineering Technicians, but do not register Chartered Engineers.

=== Requirements specific to institutions ===
Some Professional Engineering Institutions impose additional requirements on Chartered Engineer applicants, reflecting the demands of particular engineering disciplines and areas of practice. For example, applicants registering through the Nuclear Institute must demonstrate the competencies required for professional registration as well as meet the Institute's Nuclear Professionalism Standard, which sets out the knowledge, skills and behaviours expected of professionals working in the nuclear sector.

The Institution of Structural Engineers (IStructE) applies additional discipline-specific assessment requirements for the Chartered Structural Engineer title. This includes a seven-hour examination. The examination assesses the candidate's ability to develop effective, viable and sustainable structural solutions, including design appraisal, structural calculations, general arrangement drawings, carbon calculations and a method statement for safe construction.

== International equivalence ==
The level of academic education required for registration as a Chartered Engineer in the UK is comparable to that required in many continental European countries where master's-level education is required for registration as a professional engineer. The Washington Accord, signed by the Engineering Council in 1989, recognises the substantial equivalence of the learning outcomes of accredited professional engineering education programmes among signatories. Recognition under the Washington Accord is outcome-based rather than dependent on the length of engineering programmes.

The Chartered Engineer standard is expanding internationally, reflecting its growing recognition and standing within the global engineering profession. Formal recognition and registration arrangements extend beyond the United Kingdom to countries including Ireland, the Netherlands, Spain, Portugal, Italy, the United States and New Zealand.

In the Republic of Ireland, the Chartered Engineer (CEng) title is awarded by Engineers Ireland, which is the sole authority empowered to award the title in the country. The UK Engineering Council and Engineers Ireland have an Admissions Pathways Agreement, signed in 2018, under which their competency-based professional registration assessments are recognised as substantially equivalent, providing a streamlined route for recognition of professionally registered Chartered Engineers between the United Kingdom and Ireland.

In the Netherlands, the UK Engineering Council and the Royal Netherlands Society of Engineers (KIVI) have an Admissions Pathways Agreement, signed in 2023, which provides for mutual recognition and transfer of professional registration. UK Chartered Engineers (CEng) and Incorporated Engineers (IEng) may apply for registration in the Netherlands through the agreement, and corresponding KIVI registrations may be transferred to the UK.

Chartered Engineers may apply for registration as a European Engineer through ENGINEERS EUROPE, subject to an academic and professional assessment against the EUR ING SPEC. The assessment considers engineering education, training and professional experience. Successful applicants may use the pre-nominal designation EUR ING.

== Regulatory requirements ==
Many engineering tasks covered by UK legislation specify chartership as a requirement of the persons undertaking them. For example The Road Tunnel Safety Regulations 2007 require that for inspections "The person appointed as the inspection entity must be a Chartered Engineer or headed by a Chartered Engineer". Others require Chartered Engineers be registered with a particular institution, for example The Energy Efficiency (Private Rented Property) (England and Wales) Regulations 2015 require assessments be carried out by a "chartered engineer...who is registered by the Institution of Civil Engineers".

== History ==
In the 19th century engineering as a profession was becoming prolific and various disciplines (principally civil, mechanical and electrical) organised to form institutions to further the interests of their members and the industry as a whole. At this time, each institution began to implement entry examinations for membership to ensure a minimum standard of competence of their members. In the Institution of Mechanical Engineers (IMechE), for example, candidates for associate membership would be expected to sit a general knowledge paper, a three-hour paper on applied mathematics, a three-hour paper on physics and chemistry and two three-hour papers elected from the following list: materials, steam engines, internal combustion engines, hydraulics, “electrotechnics”, the theory of machines, machine design and metallurgy. Membership of an engineering institution quickly became a mark of quality and would give employers confidence in the competency of its members. Various institutions sought royal charters to formalise their position and the members became engineers by charter, or 'chartered engineers' for that institutions discipline. The first was in 1828 when the Institute of Civil Engineers was awarded its royal charter (awarding Chartered Civil Engineer). On 22 April 1930 King George V signed the IMechE's royal charter allowing members to refer to themselves as Chartered Mechanical Engineers. By the mid-1950s, a significant demand for a central body to set the standards for education and training and to represent the wider profession had arisen. This led to the creation of the Joint Council of Engineering Institutions, established in 1964, that was later known as the Council of Engineering Institutions (CEI). This body was empowered to imbue the title of Chartered Engineer to elected members of PEIs, despite attempts in the 1970s to replace the title with REng (Registered Engineer).

== See also ==
- Chartered Chemist
- Chartered Environmentalist
- Chartered IT Professional
- Chartered Physicist
- Chartered Mathematician
- Chartered Scientist
- European Engineer (EUR ING)
- Institution of Engineers of Ireland
- Dutch Professional Titles
- Irish Professional Titles
- Master of Engineering
- Master of Science in Engineering
- Professional Engineer
- SQEP
