= Society of Environmental Engineers =

British professional engineering institution

The Society of Environmental Engineers (SEE) was a British professional engineering institution founded in 1959, which ceased operations in 2019. It was licensed by the Engineering Council UK to assess candidates for inclusion on ECUK's Register of Professional Engineers and Technicians at CEng, IEng and Eng Tech levels. It was also licensed by the Society for the Environment (SocEnv) to assess candidates for CEnv. The Society's Membership Journal "Environmental Engineering" was published six times a year by the Society's partner Concorde Publishing Ltd, along with the journal's digital and online editions. Members also received other technology focused supplements including Test House Directory. Members of SEE were invited to transfer membership to the Society of Operations Engineers, free of charge, in 2019.

Sir Reginald Harland was president of the society from 1974 to 1977.

== See also ==
- Chartered engineer
- Incorporated engineer
- Engineering technician
