= Finniston Report =

The Finniston Report (also known as The Report of the Committee of Inquiry into the Engineering Profession or by its title Engineering Our Future) was a report into the engineering profession in the United Kingdom, commissioned in 1977 by the Labour government. Led by Monty Finniston it investigated how well the professional institutions were serving their members and whether it was desirable to introduce statutory regulation of the industry. It recommended abolition of the Council of Engineering Institutions (CEI), the establishment of a statutory Engineering Authority to regulate the profession, and the introduction of engineer's degrees. After its publication in 1980 the then-Conservative government decided against statutory regulation but replaced the CEI with the Engineering Council (EC). The EC would later restrict admission to the status of chartered engineer to those with engineer's degrees. The EC's 2000 Hamilton Report stated that the Finniston Report had been unfairly labeled as dirigiste and that it had actually recommended little direct legislative control over the profession.

== Background ==
The report had been commissioned by the Department of Trade and Industry (DTI) of the 1974–79 Labour government. The government recognised the level of dissatisfaction in the engineering industry with the Council of Engineering Institutions (CEI) and asked industrialist Monty Finniston to recommend changes. Finniston's terms included reviewing the extent that the CEI and the professional institutions were meeting the needs of engineers and technicians and the role the institutions played in educating and regulating their members. He was also asked to consider whether it was advantageous to introduce statutory regulation and licensing of engineers and whether any of the measures used by other countries were suitable for application in the UK. There was a concern over an anticipated shortage of engineers for the industry, particularly at the high-tech end, to be worsened by a demographic decline in the number of 18-year-olds by the early 1980s.

Finniston's committee comprised 17 members. It had originally intended to canvass opinion by visiting 100 of the country's engineering firms, but eventually only managed 33; the opinions did not form part of the report as they were gathered in confidential conditions. It visited Canada, the United States, Japan, France, West Germany, Denmark, Sweden and the Netherlands to determine the international approach, and in each country found that the status of engineers was higher than that in the United Kingdom. It also found that in each of these countries the state was involved in the registration of engineers, with only the UK leaving the matter entirely in the hands of private institutions.

Owing to dissent between members of the committee and the volume of evidence considered, the report was delivered to the DTI seven months late on 16 November 1979. It was published in January 1980 by Margaret Thatcher's government.

== Recommendations ==
Finniston stated that the CEI was failing to promote engineering or to influence national policy. The CEI itself was devoid of a central purpose as its four largest members - the Institution of Civil Engineers (ICE), Institution of Mechanical Engineers (IMechE), Institution of Chemical Engineers (IChemE) and the Institution of Electrical Engineers (IEE) – could not agree on a driving policy. Some of its members complained that the CEI was slow to implement change, with many decisions requiring unanimous consent from all 16 members.

Finniston proposed radical changes: the abolition of the CEI and its replacement by a new statutory Engineering Authority (EA). This would assume responsibility for regulating membership and admission from the individual institutions. Membership grades were to be matched to the education level of members with grades corresponding to higher national certificate, bachelor's degree and master's degree levels. The report criticised the depth and breadth of education provided by the British universities, when compared with those of Western Europe. Finniston recommended the introduction of specific engineer's degree courses (MEng and BEng) to be used as a foundation for future chartered status.

== Reception ==
The government decided not to implement Finniston's recommendation and chose to retain the independence of the institutions through self-regulation of membership. After discussion and negotiation with the institutions, it was decided to establish the Engineering Council as an overseeing body under a royal charter (not governed by parliamentary legislation as a statutory body would have been). This position was opposed by Finniston.

The CEI rejected the findings of the report and instead recommended that three new bodies be established: one to register engineers in a similar manner to the General Medical Council; one to promote the profession and seek a change in the nation's attitude to engineering; and a third to act as the voice of the profession in influencing national policy. The four main institutions were initially supportive of Finniston's recommendation to establish the EA, although the ICE later reconsidered its position stating that civil engineering was best left outside of any common approach to engineering education and regulation. The Institution of Metallurgists supported the Finniston recommendations as did the Confederation of British Industry and the Engineering Employers Federation. The Institution of Plant Engineers welcomed increased co-operation between the engineering institutions but wanted to maintain self-regulation. The Institution of Industrial Managers supported mergers between engineering institutions suggesting that it could be combined with the Institution of Plant Engineers, the Institution of Production Engineers and the Institute of Management Services.

== Legacy ==
Following its establishment, the Engineering Council implemented common systems for record continuing professional development across the engineering institutions, and the aligning of codes of professional practice. This brought engineering in line with accountants, town planners and surveyors which were the only professions at the time to require formal recording of CPD. Finniston also recommended the implementation schemes to increase the number of engineering and science students and attract more women and young people into the profession. This included the Women into Science and Engineering Campaign (WISE), established in 1984 under the leadership of Beryl Platt, Baroness Platt of Writtle, as a recommendation of the Finniston Report. The Finniston Report found that only 56% of respondents rated engineering or science as a "good" career choice for a woman, by 2000 this had increased to 72%.

In 1992 the Engineering Council restricted chartered engineer status to those applicants who held BEng or MEng degrees. A level of mistrust arose between the council and the institutions over their lack of say in its governance. Over the following years the profession became more fragmented with more than 40 institutions representing the profession. However, there is evidence that the industry has become more accessible, is perceived as more desirable and that salaries have increased in certain sectors.

The report was the last in this aspect of the profession until the Engineering Council's 2000 Hamilton Report. In this paper Sir James Hamilton found that the Finniston Report had been unfairly labeled as dirigiste, and that Finniston had actually recommended little legislative control of the profession. The 2013 Professor John Perkins' Review of Engineering Skills was a similar review into the state of the engineering profession in the United Kingdom.
