= European Young Engineers =

Non-profit organization under the World Federation of Engineering Associates

European Young Engineers MTÜ
- Founded: 1994
- Type: Nonprofit Organization
- Purpose: Engineering
- Location: Estonia
- Region served: Europe
- Website: http://www.eyengineers.eu/

The European Young Engineers (EYE) is a European non-profit organisation, listed in the register of Engineering associations of the World Federation of Engineering Associations.

== History ==
Young members of the European engineers’ organisations created a pan-European platform and founded the European Young Engineers (EYE) in 1994. During the following years several engineering associations in Europe were invited to join.

EYE became an organisation consisting of more than 23 associations and representing approximately more than 250.000 young engineers in Europe. EYE started to offer its member organisations and their students and young engineers the access to a Europe-wide network by linking the engineering associations.

EYE offers a member-hosted conference. Between these events, the community stays in contact via their website.

In 2007 the European Young Engineers signed a Memorandum of Cooperation with FEANI.

== List of member organisations ==
Country	Name of organization	Acronym
Belgium	i.e.-net ingenieursvereniging vzw	IE-NET
Bosnia-Herzegowina	Studentski elektrotehnički klub i servis Sarajevu (Student Association of Electrotechnics of the University of Sarajevo)	STELEKS
Bulgaria	ФЕДЕРАЦИЯ НА НАУЧНО-ТЕХНИЧЕСКИТЕ СЪЮЗИ В БЪЛГАРИЯ (Federation of the Scientific Engineering Unions in Bulgaria)	FNTS
Croatia	European Young Engineers Croatia	EYE-HR
Czech Republic	European Young Engineers Czech Republic	EYE-CZ
Denmark	Ingeniørforeningen i Danmark (Danish Society of Engineers)	IDA
Finland	Insinööriliitto (Union of Professional Engineers in Finland)	IL
France	Bureau National des Eleves Ingenieurs (National Bureau of Engineering)	BNEI
France	Association Francaise des Femmes Ingenieurs (French Association of Female Engineers)	FI
Germany	Verein Deutscher Ingenieure	VDI
Ireland	Engineers Ireland	EI
Luxembourg	Association Nationale des Etudiants Ingenieurs Luxembourgeois (Union of Luxembourg Engineering Students)	ANEIL
Malta	University Engineering Students Association	UESA
Netherlands	Koninklijk Instituut Van Ingenieurs (Royal Institute of Engineers in the Netherlands)	KIVI
Norway	Norges største organisasjon for ingeniører og teknologer (Norwegian Society of Engineers and Technologists)	NITO
Portugal	Ordem dos Engenheiros	OE
Republic of Macedonia	Engineering Institute of Macedonia	EIM
Spain	Consejo General de la Ingeniería Técnica Industrial de España	COGITI
Sweden	Sveriges Ingenjörer	SI
United Kingdom	Association for Consultancy and Engineering	ACE
United Kingdom	Young Railway Professionals	YRP
United Kingdom	European Young Engineers United Kingdom	EYE-UK
