= JMI-Edison =

Guam company

JMI-Edison is a Guam company that began in 1978. It was first called JMI Electrical & Air Conditioning, an electrical and air conditioning contracting company.

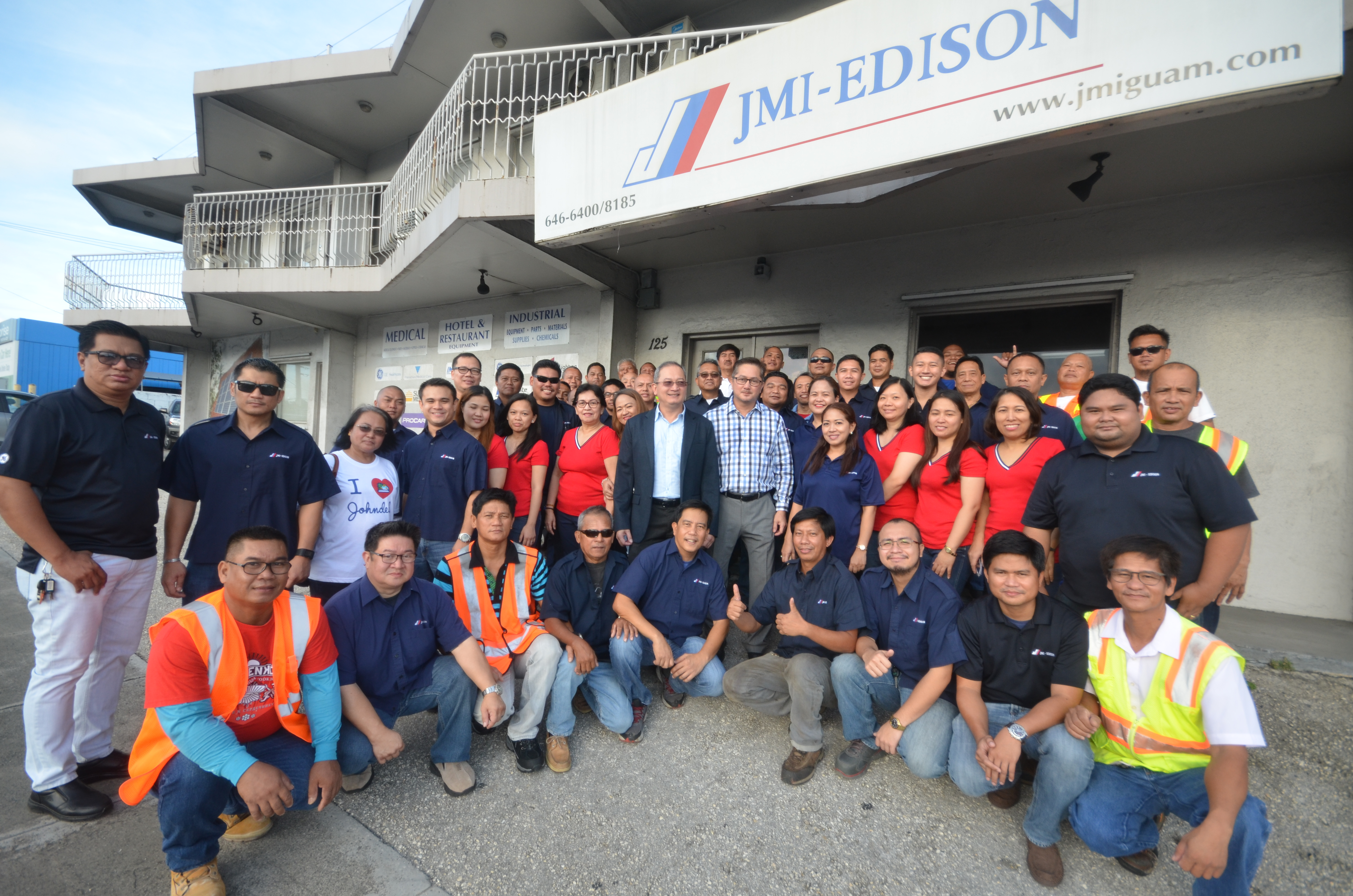
JMI-Edison company group photo shot in December 2017.

In 1979, the company expanded and added to the family, JMI Motor & Bearing Supply. It was to address the island's increasing demand for new equipment including electric motors, generators, pumps and transformers.

Founder John M. Ilao grew the company from a one-man operation to a multimillion-dollar business it is today.

The two companies became one corporate entity as JohnDel International, Inc. (Jll) in September 1986. John M. Ilao passed on his legacy to his son Ed Ilao, holds a master's degree in electrical engineering and a Registered Professional Engineer. Ed, along with his brother John R. Ilao continues to lead JMI-Edison and JohnDel International.
