= Power engineer =

Power engineer may refer to:

- Power engineering, a subfield of electrical engineering that deals with the generation, transmission, distribution and utilization of electric power
- Stationary engineer, operates industrial machinery and equipment that provide energy in various forms
