= Norman Percy Allen =

British metallurgist (1903–1972)

Norman Percy Allen CB FRS
- Born: 5 June 1903; Wrexham, Wales
- Died: 23 February 1972 (aged 68)
- Education: Sheffield University
- Known for: Metallography
- Awards: CB (1966)
- Scientific career
- Fields: Metallurgy
- Institutions: Swansea University College; University of Birmingham; Mond Nickel Company; National Physical Laboratory
- Academic advisors: Cecil Henry Desch

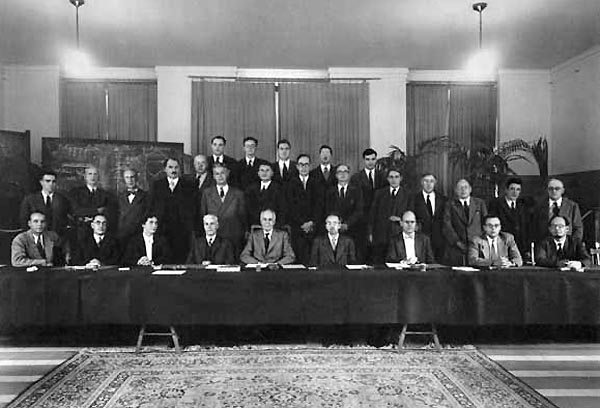
Solvay Conference on Physics in Brussels 1951. Left to right, sitting: Crussaro, Allen, Cauchois, Borelius, Bragg, Møller, Sietz, Hollomon, Frank; middle row: Gerhart Rathenau, Koster, Erik Rudberg, Flamache, Goche, Groven, Orowan, Burgers, Shockley, Guinier, C.S. Smith, Dehlinger, Laval, Henriot; top row: Gaspart, Lomer, Cottrell, Homes, Curien

Norman Percy Allen CB FRS (5 June 1903 – 23 February 1972) was a British metallurgist.

== Early life ==
He was born in Wrexham, North Wales, the son of accountant Sidney Edward Allen and educated at Burton-on-Trent Boys' Grammar School and Sheffield University, where he obtained an honours degree in metallurgy.

== Career ==
He stayed on at Sheffield to carry out research into copper die-casting alloys, but in 1925 moved to Swansea University to work for three years on the porosity of copper and copper alloys, moving again in 1929 to Birmingham University to continue the work. He was awarded a D.Sc. by Birmingham University in 1934.

In 1933 he left the university to join Mond Nickel Company at their Birmingham research laboratory under Dr Leonard Bessemer Pfeil, where he stayed until 1945. During that time he worked on the development of highly alloyed nickel base materials Nimonic having high strength and high oxidation resistance at elevated temperatures which served a key role in the use of such alloys in the new jet engines.

In 1945, he joined the National Physical Laboratory (NPL) as Superintendent of the Metallurgy Division, where he stayed until his retirement in 1969. A major project there concerned the development of superconductors, their manufacture, use and ongoing development. Other projects involved the development of physical methods of analysis such as spectrographic analysis, chromatography, colorimetry, X-ray fluorescence and absorption spectrometry. In 1966 he was appointed deputy director of the NPL.

== Honours and awards ==
He was elected a Fellow of the Royal Society in 1956 and elected President of the Institution of Metallurgists for 1961/62. He was invested as a Companion of the Order of the Bath (CB) in the 1966 Birthday Honours.

== Private life ==
He died in 1972. He had married in 1929 Olive Williams, with whom he had 2 sons and a daughter,
