= Danish Society of Engineers =

Society organisation

IDA
- The Danish Society of Engineers
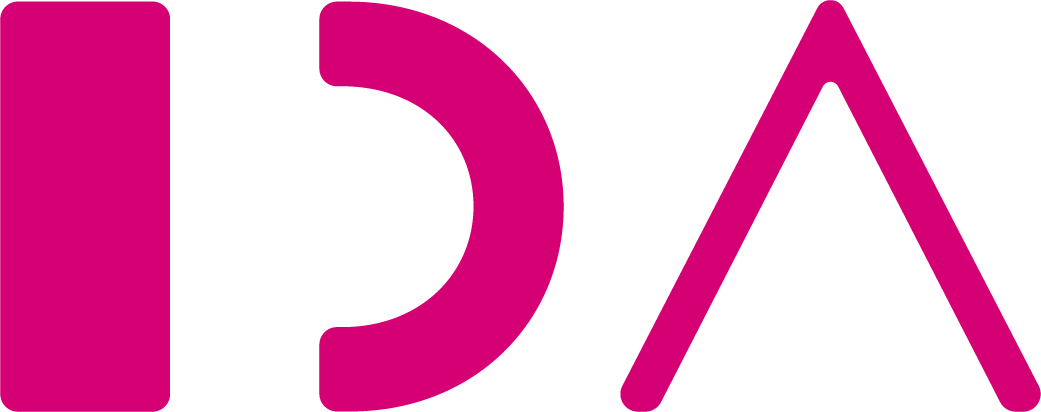
- Formation: 1 January 1995
- Type: Trade union
- Location: Copenhagen, Denmark
- Members: Over 180,000 members
- Chairperson: Laura Klitgaard
- Website: http://english.ida.dk

IDA, The Danish Society of Engineers, (Danish: Ingeniørforeningen) is a Danish trade union and interest group for highly educated professionals with a background in technology, science or IT. It has the abbreviation IDA (Ingeniørforeningen i Danmark). IDA's headquarters are in Copenhagen, Denmark.

As of 2026, IDA has over 180,000 members. IDA's main objectives are "To gather Danish engineers and other eligible candidates to look after the interests of the engineerial profession" and "To assert the significance of technical and scientific education and research to society."

IDA organises both employees, managers and the self-employed, and offers advice and feedback on, for example, matters relating to career, job search, salary, legal issues and working environment.

As an association, IDA connects members based on their professional specialties e.g. IT, construction, environment or management. Members can also meet for personal development events or for social-cultural offers. IDA hosts around 3000 annual events throughout Denmark. Many of the events are organised by volunteer IDA members.

== Denmark's Best Trade Union 2021, 2022 and 2023 ==
IDA was named the best trade union in Denmark in 2021, 2022 and again in 2023 in the "Industry Index Trade Unions 2021, 22, 23” from Loyalty Group. In the survey, IDA scored highest on both member satisfaction and member loyalty.

== IDA’s members ==
Highly educated STEM professionals make up the majority of IDA members.

Number of members as of 2022, 2012 and 2002:

| Year | Members |
|---|---|
| 2022 | 147,208 |
| 2012 | 86,386 |
| 2002 | 61,136 |

Unlike many unions, IDA organises both employees, managers (around 12%) and the self-employed (around 4%) and provides advice tailored to the different roles and work situations of members in each category.

=== International members ===
IDA has 10,400 (7%) English-speaking members who have either been recruited to Denmark for their professional skills and education, or who have completed their education in Denmark and chosen to settle there.

IDA supports non-Danish members in their transition to the Danish labour market by providing them with information on Danish workplace culture and the role of trade unions in Denmark. IDA provides the same advice to non-Danish-speaking members on legal matters, careers and working life, for example, as to Danish members.

IDA also organises a wide range of events in English.

=== Young professionals ===
In 2011 IDA established IDA Young Professionals (Danish: Yngre Fagligt Forum), a network for young professionals in Denmark. The network is active in the international umbrella organization European Young Engineers where it also represents young engineers from Denmark in the Council Meetings.

== Requirements for membership ==
A wide range of university programmes in the fields of STEM are qualifying for becoming a member of IDA. It is also possible to join IDA with other university degrees as a professional in an IT, engineering or technology company, for example in consultancies, financial institutions and many start-ups.

In addition, IDA membership is open to those without a degree who work in one of the three areas (digitisation, technology and science) at such a high level that their skills are equivalent to a long university degree.

== IDA's history ==
The Danish Society of Engineers, IDA, was founded on 1 January 1995 by a merger between the two former engineering associations Danish Engineers Association, founded 1892 and The Engineers' Association (Danish: Ingeniør-Sammenslutningen), founded 1937. The two engineers' associations differed mainly in the type of engineers they admitted and thus in the positions they held.

The Danish Engineers' Association, DIF, was founded in 1892 as an association for graduates of the Polytechnic Institute (which later became DTU). In 1933, the title "Master of Engineering" was introduced for graduates with an engineering degree of at least 5 years.

The Engineers' Association, I-S originally consisted of 3 graduate associations for constructor and BSc graduates. These graduates typically had a shorter education compared to their colleagues from the Polytechnic, and they often had a more technical or craft-oriented background.

The two associations worked closely together on several issues and slowly worked towards a merger. In 1975, the two associations' membership magazines were merged to form Ingeniøren, and in 1976 the merger was put to a vote in the two associations. But the members of DIF were not ready for a merger.

It took 18 years before the members of both associations finally voted in favour of a merger. The year after the vote in 1995, the merger was a reality.

=== Chairpersons through the years ===
- Laura Klitgaard, Master of Engineering in Architecture, 2022
- Aske Nydam Guldberg, Master of Engineering in circular economy (Acting Chairperson until 2023)
- Thomas Damkjær Petersen, Master of Engineering, 2016-2022
- Frida Frost, Master of Engineering, 2010-2016
- Lars Bytoft, Bachelor of Engineering, 2004-2010
- Per Ole Front, Master of Engineering, 1999-2004
- Ole Schiøth, Master of Engineering, 1995-1999

== Organisation ==
IDA works in three different areas simultaneously:

- As a trade union: IDA's purpose is to ensure a good working life for its members, to train and retrain as many as possible to meet the needs of the labour market, and to provide advice on legal and career-related issues.
- As a political interest group: IDA seeks to influence Danish politicians, the business community and other stakeholders to put knowledge and education first and base decisions on expert knowledge.
- As a business: IDA Insurance and IDA Conference are independent companies that are part of IDA Group operate alongside the Danish Society of Engineers, IDA.

=== IDA as a trade union ===
A number of IDA branches have direct contact with members and assist them across a wide range of concerns and challenges related to their work life.

- IDA helps the professional groups it represents to organise in the workplace, trains union representatives and assists in negotiations between employee organisations and employers.
- IDA's legal department reads employment contracts for new recruits, negotiates resignations for terminated members and takes responsibility if a dispute between parties goes to court.
- IDA's career counsellors helps members organise their working lives to best suit the individual.
- IDA's occupational health and safety consultants assist both members and companies employing IDA members in ensuring healthy working conditions and practices for employees.
- IDA Learning collects and compiles courses and continuing education in the fields in which IDA members work.
- 73 volunteer-based technical networks are organised through IDA. The technical networks are made up of volunteer members who share a common professional interest and come into contact with other professionals in their field via IDA. The networks gather both for social events and professional conferences.
- While still a student, one can join IDA and get access to low-cost insurance, social and professional networking events, online job search workshops and exam guides and tutoring.

==== Member democracy ====
The IDA Board of Representatives is the supreme authority of the association. The Board of Representatives consists of 65 persons elected by the voting members of the Association. Graduate members elect 61 persons to the Board of Representatives and student members elect 4 persons to the Board of Representatives.

Elections to the Board of Representatives are held every 3 years. The Board of Representatives elects an executive committee, which is responsible to the Board of Representatives for the management of the association. The Executive Committee is elected for a period of 3 years. The members of the executive committee can be re-elected only once. The Board of Representatives shall also elect a Chairperson for a term of three years. Re-election is possible once.

IDA is also the setting for a wide range of regional network all of which are run by active members on voluntary boards.

=== IDA as a political interest group ===
The political work of IDA is an extension of the work of the Board of Representatives. While the Board of Representatives sets the direction for the work of the IDA, the staff of the IDA Policy Department is responsible for implementing the decisions.

== IDA Group ==
IDA also has a number of wholly or partly owned subsidiaries related to IDA's core businesses.

- IDA Insurance- IDA Insurance is an insurance mediator offering insurance to members.
- IDA Conference - IDA Conference is a conference centre located in the IDA headquarters in Copenhagen and offers facilities for meetings and conferences. It services both IDA's many professional groups and external companies and private persons hosting conferences, meetings, concerts, Christmas parties or private celebrations.
- Teknologiens Mediehus A/S - IDA is also the major shareholder (5 million DKK) in the weekly magazine Ingeniøren, published by the media company Teknologiens mediehus. Teknologiens mediehus publishes both the general technology news magazine Ingeniøren and ing.dk, the IT media Version2.dk, PRO media - a number of niche media and the job portal Jobfinder.dk.
- IEF - The IEF is an abbreviation of the Engineers' Further Education Fund. The IEF works to promote the professional competences and social understanding of engineers and graduates.
- Mannaz - Mannaz is an international company that develops the skills of managers, project leaders and knowledge workers
- AKA Akademikernes A-kasse - IDA does not run its own unemployment fund, but works closely with other academic organisations on the unemployment insurance fund AKA - Akademikernes A-kasse. IDA is represented on the AKA Board.
- P+ and ISP - pension funds - IDA recommends that members take out a pension in either P+ or ISP. IDA is represented on the boards of both pension funds.

== Danish and international organisations ==
IDA represents its members in a number of Danish and international organisations

=== At a national level ===
IDA belongs to The Danish Confederation of Professional Associations (Akademikerne).

Internationally

FEANI - a federation of national engineering organisations from 29 European countries.

ANE - the Association of Nordic Engineers.
