= Standish Masterman =

English chemist, rocket expert (1912–1994)

Standish Masterman (1912–1994) was an English research chemist, a rocket fuel and ballistic missile expert of World War II. Falling under suspicion because of past connections with the Communist Party of Great Britain in 1954, he was awarded an OBE in 1963.

== Background ==
William Fairless Masterman (1840–1927), whose middle name was originally Fairles, was the paternal grandfather of Standish Masterman. Noted as an evangelical Christian and benefactor, he resided at Mayfield Lodge, Christ Church Road, Folkestone. The elder of the two sons of John Masterman of Walworth Castle, he married in 1874, in Dublin as her second husband, Sophia Mary Macnamara née Hartrick, third daughter of Standish Hartrick of New Ross, County Wexford.

John Standish Masterman (died 1967) was the only son of William Fairless Masterman, and the father of Standish Masterman. He married in 1911 Phyllis Gordon, daughter of John Gordon of Folkestone. A officer of the West Kent Militia with rank of Captain, in 1910 he was the Folkestone secretary of the National Service League. During World War I he worked for the Red Cross. He had a temporary British Army rank of Captain from the end of 1916 as a recruiting officer.

== Early life ==
Masterman was awarded a B.Sc. degree at University College, London in 1934. He published in 1937 a paper on reaction kinetics and Walden inversion with Edward David Hughes and Christopher Kelk Ingold. He gained a Ph.D. in 1938. A series of collaborative papers ensued, to 1940.

In August 1938 Masterman took part in a Daily Express trial of civilian gas masks. In September of that year he gave a Left Book Club talk on air raid shelters in Bingley, criticising the current government plans for provision. He acted as treasurer for the Association of Scientific Workers.

== World War II ==
During World War II, after his 1940 marriage, Masterman and his wife were evacuated from London to Swansea. There they knew Dylan Thomas, an acquaintance renewed in 1950, in the USA.

In 1944 Masterman was sent on a mission of reconnaissance in relation to the testing of the V-2 rocket by the Germans. To get to occupied Poland, he went by Iran and the USSR. He was one of two civilians in a British team led by Colonel Terence Sanders, with Arthur Merriman and others. The British had contact with local Polish agents who helped in the recovery of spent rockets.The search in the Debica region was active for about a month from 26 August. There was competition from a Soviet team, working to acquire rocket technology for Pyotr I Fyodorov, and a smaller American team including Stephen Joseph Zand was also present.

== Later life ==
With inherited money, Masterman had bought a lease on 7 Hanover Terrace, in a John Nash development on London's Regent's Park. Wallis Simpson had lived there during the Abdication Crisis of 1936–7, on a lease from the Crown Commissioners. After the war, Anthony Michaelis, a friend of Masterman from the 1930s, lived in the basement flat when he returned from Australia at a low ebb.

For some time, Masterman worked at the Chemical Research and Development Establishment of the Ministry of Supply. It was situated at Sutton Oak, and closed in 1954. In September of that year newspapers carried a story stating that Masterman, with his agreement, had been moved to non-secret government work. It followed his disclosure in a security questionnaire that he had been a Communist Party member, leaving in 1944.

Subsequently Masterman worked in the Ministry of Power where in 1963 he was Senior Principal Scientific Officer, at the time of his award of the OBE. During the period 1960 to 1962 he was head of the gasification project in the Ministry. He described the design of a fixed bed gasifier in a 1962 paper with his Ministry colleague William Alexander Peet.

== Family ==
In 1940 Masterman married the artist and illustrator Rhoda Glass, known as Dodie Masterman. They had a son Fairless, born in 1953.

Standish Masterman was a first cousin once removed of the artist Archibald Standish Hartrick. The Hartrick name is associated with German immigrants in south-east Ireland from the Electoral Palatinate.
