= IISP =

IISP or variant may refer to:

- Institute of Information Security Professionals, an organization for advancing the professionalism of information security practitioners
- Citation IISP, business jet
- Gulfstream IISP, business jet
