= John Perkins (chemical engineer) =

Academic, engineering scientist and government adviser

John Douglas Perkins (born 18 March 1950) is a retired academic, engineering scientist, and government adviser. He held professorships at Imperial College London and the University of Sydney, served as President of the Institution of Chemical Engineers and was Chief Scientific Adviser to the Department for Business, Innovation and Skills.

== Career ==
Born on 18 March 1950, Perkins was educated at Imperial College London, graduating with a first-class Bachelor of Science degree in chemical engineering in 1971; he was awarded the Hinchley Memorial Medal. He then spent two years studying for a PhD at Imperial, supported by a studentship from Salters' Institute of Industrial Chemistry, before becoming a demonstrator in chemical engineering at the University of Cambridge. In 1977, his PhD was awarded, and in the same year, he returned to Imperial as a lecturer. He was promoted to a senior lectureship in 1983 and then moved to the University of Sydney in 1985, where for three years he was ICI Professor of Systems Engineering. He then returned to Imperial once more, as Professor of Chemical Engineering in 1988; in 2000, he was promoted to a named chair, the Courtaulds Professorship in Chemical Engineering; he was principal of the Faculty of Engineering from 2001 to 2004. While at Imperial, he was one of a number of people responsible for the start-up and spinning out of PSE Ltd and ParOS. In 2004, he moved to the University of Manchester, where he was Vice President and Dean of Engineering and Physical Sciences from 2004 to 2009; Manchester then made him an honorary professor on retirement. Between 2012 and 2015, Perkins was the Chief Scientific Adviser to the United Kingdom government's Department for Business, Innovation and Skills and authored the Perkins Review of engineering skills. He has since been a director of JP2 Consulting.

Perkins's research relates to process systems engineering.

== Honours and awards ==
Perkins was appointed a Commander of the Order of the British Empire in the 2007 New Year Honours. He is a Fellow of: the Institution of Chemical Engineers (since 1986), the Institute of Mathematics and its Applications (since 1993), the Royal Academy of Engineering (since 1993), the City and Guilds of London Institute (since 1996), the Royal Society of Arts (since 2004), and the Institute of Engineering and Technology (since 2015). He was President of the Institution of Chemical Engineers for the 2000–01 year, and was Vice-President of the Royal Academy of Engineering from 2007 to 2010.

Academic offices
Preceded by Geoffrey Hewitt	Courtaulds Professor of Chemical Engineering, Imperial College London; 1999–2004	Unknown
Preceded by New position.	Principal, Faculty of Engineering; Imperial College London; 2001–2004	Succeeded by Julia King, Baroness Brown of Cambridge
Other offices
Preceded by John Harris Robinson	President, Institution of Chemical Engineers; 2000–2001	Succeeded by Graham Lawson
