= Institution of Metallurgists =

British professional association

The Institution of Metallurgists was a British professional association for metallurgists, largely involved in the iron and steel industry.

== History ==
It was founded in 1945. The inaugural meeting was held on 28 November 1945; the organization was formed by the Iron and Steel Institute and the Institute of Metals.

The International Iron and Steel Institute was formed in 1967, which is now the World Steel Association. by the late 1960s the Institution had around 10,000 metallurgists.

It was involved in the formation of the Association of Professional Scientists and Technologists (APST) in 1971, which was formed as a result of the Industrial Relations Act 1971.

=== Education ===
In September 1965, Ordinary National Certificates in science were introduced, in consultation with the Institution, the Royal Institute of Chemistry, the Institute of Physics, the Physical Society, the Institute of Biology, and the Mathematical Association.

In January 1969, these same set of institutions set up the Council of Science and Technology Institutes (CSTI), which ended up as the Science Council in 2003.

=== Royal Charter ===
It was given a Royal Charter in 1975. In 1977 it became the sixteenth constituent of the •Council of Engineering Institutions, which became the Engineering Council in 1981.

=== Merger ===
It merged with the Metals Society to become Institute of Metals on 1 January 1985.

== Structure ==
In the 1960s it was headquartered at 17 Belgrave Square in the City of Westminster. In the 1970s it moved to Northway House on the A1000 (High Road) in north London.

== Registrar-Secretaries ==
- Arthur Merriman 1946–57
- Terry Marsden 1976–81

== Presidents ==
Source: The Institute of Materials, Minerals and Mining

- 1945-46 Dr Harold Moore CBE
- 1945-47 Dr John Watson Jenkin
- 1945-48 Dr Maurice Cook CBE
- 1945-49 Eric Winearls Colbeck
- 1951-52 Dr Colin James Smithells
- 1952-53 Prof. Hugh O'Neill
- 1953-54 Dr Leonard Bessemer Pfeil OBE FRS
- 1954-55 William Barr OBE
- 1955-56 Dr Frank Charles Thompson
- 1956-57 Dr George Leo Bailey CBE
- 1957-58 James Mitchell CBE
- 1958-59 William Edward Ballard
- 1959-60 Alfred John Murphy CBE (Vice-Chancellor of Cranfield Institute of Technology, 1969)
- 1960-61 William Edward Bardgett
- 1961-62 Dr Norman Percy Allen CB FRS
- 1962-63 Dr Edward George West OBE
- 1963-64 Dr Leslie Northcott CBE
- 1964-65 Dr Leonard Rotherham CBE FRS
- 1965-66 Dr Ivor Jenkins CBE
- 1966-67 Dr John Geoffrey Ball
- 1967-68 Dr Henton Morrogh CBE FRS FREng
- 1968-69 Dr William Albert Baker
- 1969-70 Dr Arthur Henry Sully OBE
- 1970-72 Dr Arthur George Quarrell
- 1972-73 Alan Prince
- 1973-74 Dr Donald Charles Moore
- 1974-75 Dr Walter Eric Duckworth FInstP
- 1975-76 Sir Harold Montague Finniston FRS FRSE
- 1976-77 Dr Alfred James Kennedy CBE
- 1977-78 Prof. Robert William Kerr Honeycombe
- 1978-79 Ernest James Bradbury
- 1979-80 Dr Roy Woodward Nichols
- 1980-81 Dr Jack Nutting
- 1981-82 Peter Thomas Houldcroft
- 1982-83 Dr James Ernest Hughes
- 1983-84 Dr Robert Sandford Barnes
- 1985 the Institution merged with the Metals Society to become the Institute of Metals

== See also ==
- Institution of Mining and Metallurgy
- Institute of Metallurgical Technicians
