= Bureau of Engineer Surveyors =

British professional organisation

The Bureau of Engineering Surveyors is the professional sector of the Society of Operations Engineers (SOE) for Engineer Surveyors, but also allied professionals in building services and engineering safety. It was founded in 1965 and merged with other societies to form the SOE in 2000. Its members check machinery and fixed plant for safety, and for meeting legal requirements.
