= Puerto Rico Professional College of Engineers and Land Surveyors =

Professional College of Engineers and Land Surveyors of Puerto Rico
- Established: May 15, 1938; 88 years ago
- Type: Engineering and surveying professional association
- Headquarters: 500 Calle Antolin Nin, San Juan, Puerto Rico
- Region served: Puerto Rico and the U.S.
- Members: 11500
- Key people: Agrim. Carlos Fournier Morales, President
- Website: www.ciapr.org

The Professional College of Engineers and Land Surveyors of Puerto Rico —Spanish: Colegio de Ingenieros y Agrimensores de Puerto Rico (CIAPR)— is the association mandated by law that groups all professionals that call, present, or represent themselves as "engineers" or "land surveyors" in Puerto Rico. (Note: CIAPR "In order to be called, presented or represented as an engineer, architect or land surveyor in Puerto Rico, you have to be [...] a member of the CIAPR.") As with many other countries, the profession of engineering and land surveying is both regulated and licensed in Puerto Rico; while another entity, namely the Puerto Rico Examining Board of Engineers and Land Surveyors, regulates the profession and emits its corresponding licenses, the Puerto Rico Annotated Codes and Act 173 of 1988 requires that all licensed engineers and land surveyors in Puerto Rico be members of the College. The quasi-public nonprofit corporation was established on May 15, 1938, through Act 319 of 1938, to bring together professionals with the right to practice engineering, architecture, and surveying in Puerto Rico.

The primary mission of the Professional College is to promote the protection and development of engineering and surveying, fostering ethics and excellence in professional practice for the benefit of the public and the people of Puerto Rico.

== Organizational structure ==
The general assembly, which is composed of all members of the college, is the highest organ of organizational power.

The Professional College is composed primarily of its governing board, which in turn is composed of the President, two vice presidents elected by the members of the Professional College in a meetings held in the general assembly each year, and delegates who are the presidents of chapters and institutes elected by their chapters and institutes' members registered for their assemblies each year.

There's an executive committee who are composed by President, 1st and 2nd vicepresident, Treasurer, secretary, and an auditor. The committee is responsible for urgent executive actions when the board is not in session, with the previous consent of the board.

The professional college institutes are semi-autonomous bodies that represent various professional bodies, the government board, or the public.

In addition to these agencies, the Professional College has approximately twenty permanent and ad hoc committees, each designated for specific projects. The college also has an independent disciplinary tribunal that is used in cases of violations of professional conduct or ethics or disputes between colleges.

== Former presidents of CIAPR ==
The following have served as presidents of the CIAPR:

- 1938-1940 Engineer / Architect Etienne Totti-Torres - First President of CIAAPR, Worcester Polytechnic Institute.
- 1940-1942 Eng. Manuel Font Jimenez - Civil Engineer and Health, Massachusetts Institute of Technology
- 1942-1944 Eng. Juan G. Figueroa - Civil Engineer, CAAM.
- 1944-1946 Eng. Arturo Romaguera - Mechanical Engineer, Cornell University.
- 1946-1948 Eng. Gustavo E. Padilla - Civil Engineer, lawyer, appraiser and artist, CAAM, University of Michigan.
- 1948-1950 Eng. Orlando R. Mendez - Civil Engineer, University of Michigan.
- 1950-1952 Eng. Cesar Cordero-Davila, Civil Engineer, CAAM, Adjutant General of the PR National Guard
- 1952-1953 Eng. Gustavo E. Padilla - Civil Engineer and lawyer, University of Michigan.
- 1953-1955 Eng. Salvador V. Caro Costa - Civil and Mechanical Engineer, CAAM.
- 1955-1957 Eng. Jose Luis Capacete - Civil Engineer, Dayton and Illinois Institute of Technology
- 1957-1959 Eng. Rafael V. Urrutia García - Civil Engineer, CAAM Executive Director Electricity Authority.
- 1959-1960 Eng. Gustavo E. Padilla - Civil Engineer and lawyer, University of Michigan.
- 1960-1962 Eng. Rafael Doménech - Civil Engineer, CAAM.
- 1962-1964 Arch. Horacio Diaz - Architect, Tulane University.
- 1964-1966 Eng. Antonio Cajigas Flames - Civil Engineer and lawyer, CAAM.
- 1966-1968 Eng. Manuel A. Kortright - Civil Engineer and lawyer, CAAM.
- 1968-1970 Eng. Victor Manuel García Saldaña - Electrical engineer, CAAM, electrical and mechanical engineering consultant.
- 1970-1972 Eng. Dennis W. Hernandez-Santiago - Civil Engineer, CAAM and MIT, Secretary of Transportation and Public Works.
- 1972-1974 Eng. Rafael Lopez Vega -Electrical Engineer, CAAM
- 1974-1976 Eng. Jose Francisco Quinonez-Soto - Civil Engineer, CAAM.
- 1976-1978 Eng. Rafael Davila-Siaca - Civil Engineer, CAAM, Univ. of Illinois.
- 1978-1980 Eng. Joseph E. Custodio Planel - Mechanical Engineer, CAAM.
- 1980-1982 Eng. Jose A. Ojeda Ortiz - Civil Engineer, CAAM.
- 1982-1984 Eng. Gilberto Delgado Toledo - Mechanical Engineer, CAAM.
- 1984-1985 Eng. Patria G. Custodio Planel - Industrial Engineer, CAAM, Chairwoman of the PR Planning Board.
- 1985-1987 Eng. Enrique Ruiz Miranda - Civil Engineer, CAAM.
- 1987-1988 Eng. Alberto Sanchez Brignoni - Electrical Engineer, CAAM.
- 1988-1989 Eng. Jairo Lascarro PhD - Mechanical Engineer, CAAM, Drexel University, University of Miami.
- 1989-1990 Eng. Samuel Rosario Santos - Mechanical Engineer, CAAM., 1989-May 1990
- 1990-1992 Eng. Michael A. Roa Vargas - Civil Engineer, CAAM.
- 1992-1994 Eng. Jose Ramiro Rodriguez - Chemical Engineer, CAAM
- 1994-1996 Eng. José M. Izquierdo-Encarnación - Civil Engineer, CAAM, Secretary of Transportation and Public Works, Secretary of State of Puerto Rico.
- 1996-1998 Eng. Elliot Merced Montanes - Civil Engineer and lawyer, CAAM.
- 1998-2000 Eng. Orlando Guihurt Slim - Mechanical Engineer, CAAM.
- 2000-2002 Eng. Ivan Nicolau-Nin - Chemical Engineer, CAAM.
- 2002-2004 Surveyor Israel Otero Rosario - Surveyor, Member of the Puerto Rico House of Representatives
- 2004-2006 Eng. Robert L. Rexach Cintron - Civil Engineer, University of Massachusetts.
- 2006-2007 Eng. John A. Pérez González - Chemical Engineer, CAAM.
- 2007-2008 Eng. Antonio E. Medina Delgado - Mechanical Engineer, CAAM.
- 2009-2011 Eng. Miguel A. Torres Diaz, MEM - Civil Engineer, Master in Engineering Management, Universidad Politecnica de PR

== Institutes ==
The CIAPR has eight Institutes:

- Institute of Surveyors.
- Institute of Environmental Engineers.
- Institute of Civil Engineers.
- Institute of Computer Engineers.
- Institute of Electrical Engineers.
- Institute of Industrial Engineers.
- Institute of Mechanical Engineers.
- Institute of Chemical Engineers.

== Chapters ==
The CIAPR has eleven Regional Chapters:

- Aguadilla Chapter
- Arecibo Chapter
- Bayamon Chapter
- Carolina Chapter
- Guayama Chapter
- Humacao Chapter
- Ponce Chapter
- San Juan Chapter
- Mainland Chapter (Headquarters in Florida)
