= Professor John Perkins' Review of Engineering Skills =

Professor John Perkins' Review of Engineering Skills, also known as the Perkins Review, was a 2013 report commissioned by the Department for Business, Innovation and Skills (BIS) on engineering training and the skills shortage in the United Kingdom. Principally authored by the Chief Scientific Adviser to the BIS (Professor John Perkins), it made key recommendations for improving the training of British engineers and encouraging more entrants into the profession. Key aspects it highlighted included the gender gap, with ten times more men employed in the profession than women, and the current reliance on foreign engineers.

== The report ==
The report was commissioned by the Department for Business, Innovation and Skills (BIS) under the Cameron–Clegg coalition government and took two years to prepare. The principal author of the report was Professor John Perkins, the chief scientific adviser to BIS, and it was published in November 2013. Perkins' contract expired the next year and he left the BIS. A 1980 paper, the Finniston Report made a similar review of the state of the engineering profession in the United Kingdom.

== Findings ==
Perkins stated that an engineering skills shortage was hampering the country's recovery from the Great Recession. There was a "substantial demand for engineers" and an undersupply which meant that 73% of manufacturing companies had reported a difficulty in filling engineering roles since 2010. More than half of the occupations listed in the British government's tier 2 shortage occupations list are in engineering with a further 20% for allied scientific or technical roles.

The report showed that there was a failure to attract girls into the profession. It stated that only 35% of 11–14 year-old girls would consider a career in engineering and only 24% of their parents would consider it a suitable career for their daughters. This fed through into the older age groups – at further education level only around 15% of applicants for undergraduate engineering courses are women and only one in ten of British engineering professionals are female, the lowest proportion in any country of the European Union. Perkins stated that there was a lack of female role models from within the profession. In press interviews accompanying the release of the report business secretary Vince Cable stated that "half of all state schools don't have a single girl doing physics".

Perkins showed that the profession was relying on immigrants to make up the skills deficit. The report stated that in some sectors such as oil and gas or aerospace immigrants accounted for 20% of professional engineering roles and that 32% of students studying engineering and technology in the UK were from overseas.

The Perkins report made 22 key recommendations for the government to address the skills shortage. This included working to promote the industry to girls, increasing the uptake of A-level physics, recruiting more physics teachers and introducing new vocational qualifications for 16-19 year olds. He also urged the professional engineering institutions to work to promote the sector to young people.

== Impact ==
Upon his retirement Perkins expressed confidence that the government had implemented measures to address the skills shortage. This included providing additional university funding for STEM courses, to fund engineering research and to construct teaching facilities. He also highlighted work done by practising engineers in schools and colleges to promote the subject. As part of the response to the Perkins Review business secretary Vince Cable announced £49 million of funding for improvements to engineering education. This included funding for the new Manufacturing Technology Centre in Coventry, schemes to encourage children to consider engineering as a career and for initiatives to encourage former engineers to return to the industry. The funding was monitored as part of the government's Employer Ownership Fund.

A further £2.8 million of funding, as part of the Improving Engineering Careers scheme, was announced in March 2015 to help six companies implement the objectives of the Perkins Review. The companies, which included the Nissan plant in Sunderland, would match the government funding and implement schemes to train more British engineers and offer more job positions. The government will introduce the first T Levels, a new technical qualification for 17-18 year olds from 2020.

The review was welcomed by many of the engineering institutions including the Institution of Engineering and Technology, the Institution of Mechanical Engineers and the Nuclear Institute – many of whom highlighted their existing schemes to encourage women and young people into the industry. One key outcome from the report was support for the Tomorrow's Engineers programme, a national initiative to give every 11- to 14-year-old hand-on experience with a local engineering firm. A year on from the report the programme had reached 50,000 school pupils in more than 1,200 schools. Girls who participated in the programme were 50% more likely to see engineering as an attractive career choice.

Shortly after its publication the report was debated by the British House of Commons in a Westminster Hall debate on 10 December 2013. Conservative MP Peter Luff advocated targeting campaigns at age groups even younger than the 11-year-olds proposed in Perkins' report, citing research from the National Foundation for Educational Research that intervention at primary school age was most effective – an opinion echoed by Meg Munn. Andrew Miller advocated a more joined up system of apprenticeships as a means of meeting the Perkins objectives. David Mowat called for greater visibility of engineers in the media and noted that, unlike in Britain, in Europe engineers were held in higher regard – on a par with doctors. He also noted that salaries were an issue with many engineering graduates entering other high-paid professions such as accountancy instead.

Perkins carried out his own review on actions taken in the year following the publication of the report. He noted the improvement in the standing of the profession brought about by the government funding of the Tomorrow's Engineers programme and the successful introduction of a "Tomorrow's Engineers Week". He also welcomed the actions taken by 200 engineering companies to open up new entry-level engineering positions and to implement their own schemes to attract young people and women into the profession. There was also an improvement recognised in the education sector with steps taken to fund scholarships to attract high-quality STEM candidates into the teaching profession but noted that there had been no progress in improving the uptake of A-level physics amongst female students. At further education level it was noted that applications for engineering courses had increased by 6.1% over the previous year and recognised an increase of £385 million in government funding of science and engineering courses.
