= Institution of Engineers =

Institution of Engineers may refer to

- Hong Kong Institution of Engineers
- Institution of Engineering and Technology, Britain
- Institution of Engineers, Bangladesh
- Institution of Engineers (India)
- Institution of Engineers of Ireland
- Institution of Engineers and Shipbuilders in Scotland
- Institution of Engineers, Sri Lanka
- Zimbabwe Institution of Engineers
