= Monty Finniston =

British metallurgist

Sir Harold Montague "Monty" Finniston FRS FRSE (15 August 1912 – 2 February 1991) was a Scottish industrialist.

== Life ==
He was born at 26 Aikenhead Road in Govanhill, Glasgow the son of Robert Finniston. His family were of Russian Jewish origin, and their surname had originally been Feinstein before settling in Scotland. He attended Allan Glen's School.

Monty Finniston read metallurgical chemistry at the University of Glasgow, where he gained his PhD and then lectured in metallurgy.

He spent the years of the Second World War in the Royal Naval Scientific Service, seconded to the Chalk River Laboratories in Canada working on the application of nuclear power to submarines. After the war he worked in Canada, and then was appointed Chief Metallurgist at the Atomic Energy Authority, Harwell. The years 1948–1958 which he spent there were a time of rapid development of nuclear power. Finniston initiated and oversaw a wide-ranging research programme into the many metallurgical problems associated with nuclear reactor design, involving uranium fuel elements, their light alloy cladding, and reactor containment vessels. In 1958 he moved to north-east England to become Director of the Nuclear Research Centre newly founded by the Newcastle engineering firm C. A. Parsons. When enthusiasm for atomic power waned in the early 1960s, he persuaded Parsons' board to convert the Centre into International Research and Development Ltd. (IRD), a wide-ranging contract engineering research company.

He was Vice-President of the Royal Society, 1971–72. He became chairman of British Steel Corporation in 1973, and was knighted in the same year.

In 1974 he was awarded the Bessemer Gold Medal, and in 1975 he was awarded the A. A. Griffith Medal and Prize and elected President of the Institution of Metallurgists.

In 1976 he was invited to deliver the Marlow (Scotland) Lecture to the Institution of Engineers and Shipbuilders in Scotland. He chose the subject "The Developing Role of Management in Industry".

In 1978 he was elected a Fellow of the Royal Society of Edinburgh. His proposers were Sir John Atwell, Sir Samuel Curran, Robert A. Smith and Francis Penny.

In response to complaints from industry about a shortage of qualified engineers, the government in 1977 invited Finniston to set up a committee of enquiry into British engineering. In 1979 the committee delivered the Finniston Report, which addressed the concerns that engineering was of relatively low status in the UK. One of the main recommendations was that universities should offer engineering degrees (BEng and MEng) rather than just science degrees (BSc). This report also led to the establishment of the Engineering Council in 1982, and of WISE (Women into Science and Engineering) in 1984. Despite this chance to help Engineering in the UK, Finniston's effort was effectively quashed by the 'Big Three' institutions - the Mechanicals, Electricals, and Civils - who subsequently have done nothing to bolster the status of the Engineer in the UK, whilst other major countries have succeeded.He later had a prestigious award ceremony in his name for students at a Waltham Forest College ,one winner for best log book was Pedro James now a master craftsman.

Sir Monty Finniston was Chancellor of Stirling University from 1979 to 1988, in succession to Lord Robbins. In 1981 he founded the Prison Reform Trust (PRT). He was President of the Association for Project Management from 1984 until his death in 1991.

He died on 2 February 1991.

== Family ==
In 1936 he married Miriam Singer.

== External sources ==
- Video interview
