= Society of Operations Engineers =

Professional organisations in United Kingdom

The Society of Operations Engineers (SOE) is an engineering professional organization in the United Kingdom, formed by the merger of following three bodies in 2000: Institute of Road Transport Engineers (IRTE), Institution of Plant Engineers (IPlantE), and Bureau of Engineer Surveyors (BES). In 2019, members of the Society of Environmental Engineers were invited to join SOE as SEE ceased operations.

== Professional accreditation ==
The SOE is an Institution Member of Engineering Council, its members with at Member (MSOE) and Fellow (FSOE) may be nominated for registration at Engineering Technician (EngTech), Incorporated Engineer (IEng) and Chartered Engineer (CEng) levels.
