= Arthur Merriman =

- Born: 25 November 1892; Manchester, Lancashire
- Died: 4 November 1972 (aged 79); Streatham, London
- Military career
- Allegiance: United Kingdom
- Branch: British Army
- Service years: 1917–1919; 1941–1945
- Rank: Lieutenant Colonel
- Units: Royal Army Ordnance Corps; Royal Engineers
- Conflicts: First World War; Second World War: The Blitz
- Awards: George Cross; Officer of the Order of the British Empire; Legion of Honour (France)
- Other work: Government scientist, metallurgist, Deputy Lieutenant of London

Arthur Douglas Merriman, GC, OBE, DL, FRSE (25 November 1892 – 2 November 1972) was a government scientist with the Ministry of Supply, a British Army officer, and a recipient of the George Cross.

== Early life and career ==
Merriman was born in Manchester in 1892. On 22 July 1917, during the First World War, he received a temporary commission as a second lieutenant in the Royal Army Ordnance Corps, and was confirmed in his rank and promoted to temporary lieutenant on 3 November. He entered France as an acting captain on 3 April 1918 (promoted 2 July). He was decorated with the Legion d'honneur, and relinquished his commission on 25 September 1919, leaving the army as a captain. In the 1930s he was a teacher in Wallsend, before becoming Secretary of the Faculty of Architects and Surveyors, in March 1938. They later awarded him an honorary fellowship, shortly before the events for which he was awarded the George Cross.

== Second World War ==
With the outbreak of the Second World War, he returned to ordnance work as a civilian government scientist, defusing German bombs around the United Kingdom, under the cover occupation of an inspector of air raid shelters. In 1940 the Luftwaffe were continually bombing London as part of the Blitz. When a bomb dropped on Regent Street on 11 September 1940, Merriman proceeded to remove most of the explosive from the bomb. When it did detonate, it caused minimal damage and for his actions he was awarded the George Cross on 3 December 1940. The George Cross is the highest award for bravery that can be awarded to civilians in the United Kingdom.

Merriman's George Cross citation appeared in the London Gazette on 3 December 1940:

The King has been graciously pleased to approve the award of the George Cross to:- Arthur Douglas Merriman, Part-time Experimental Officer, Directorate of Scientific Research, Ministry of Supply. For conspicuous bravery in connection with bomb disposal.

On 1 January 1941 he was commissioned as a second lieutenant and given the acting rank of lieutenant colonel. His war-substantive rank was increased to lieutenant with effect from 1 January 1942, and later that year to major. On 6 January 1944 he was named an Officer of the Order of the British Empire for "gallant and distinguished services in the Middle East". He was Scientific Adviser to the Commander-in-Chief Middle East.

== Later life ==
In 1946 he became Registrar-Secretary of the Institution of Metallurgists, a post he held until 1957. On 12 December 1955 he was appointed a Deputy Lieutenant for the County of London. In 1967 he became Master of the Worshipful Company of Tin Plate Workers. He was awarded an Honorary Doctorate by the University of Surrey in 1969. He died in 1972.

On 27 June 2013 The Daily Telegraph reported that Merriman's George Cross had been put up for auction by his grandson, with an estimate of £60,000.
