= Stationary engineer =

Operates industrial machinery and equipment that provide energy in various forms

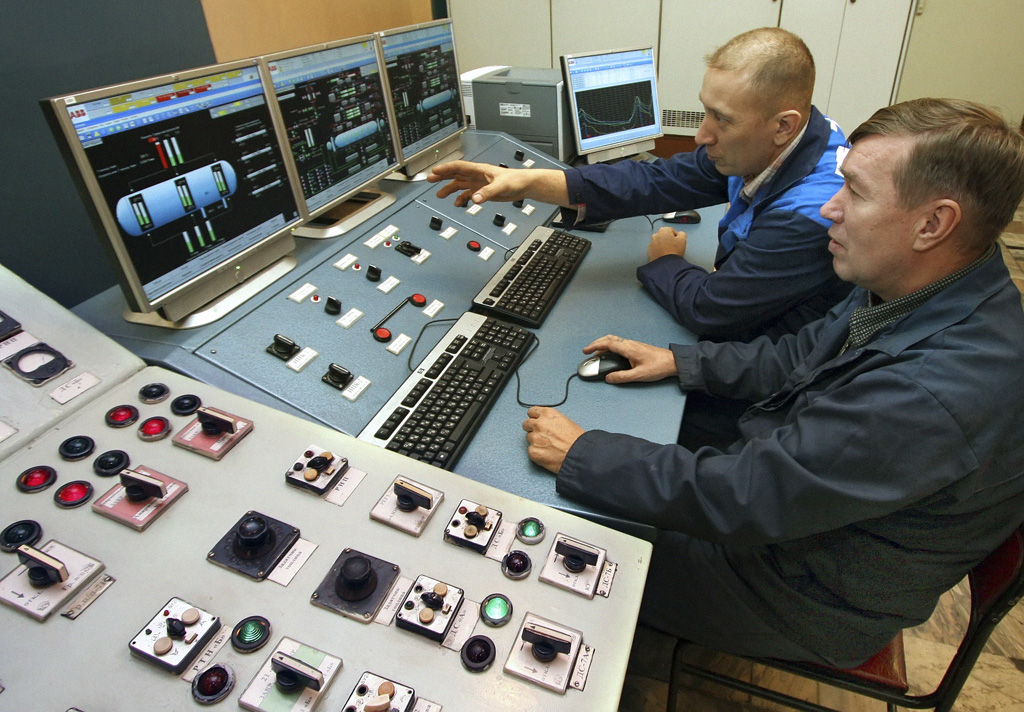
Operators controlling various equipment within a control room

A stationary engineer (also called an operating engineer, power engineer or process operator) is a technically trained professional who operates, troubleshoots and oversees industrial machinery and equipment that provide and utilize energy in various forms.

The title "power engineer" may also refer to an engineer whose work involves power engineering, a subset of electrical engineering concerned with power systems.

Stationary engineers are responsible for the safe operation and maintenance of a wide range of equipment including boilers, steam turbines, gas turbines, gas compressors, generators, motors, air conditioning systems, heat exchangers, heat recovery steam generators (HRSGs) that may be directly fired (duct burners) or indirectly fired (gas turbine exhaust heat collectors), hot water generators, and refrigeration machinery in addition to its associated auxiliary equipment (air compressors, natural gas compressors, electrical switchgear, pumps, etc.).

Stationary engineers are trained in many areas, including mechanical, thermal, chemical, electrical, metallurgy, instrumentation, and a wide range of safety skills. They typically work in factories, office buildings, hospitals, warehouses, power generation plants, industrial facilities, and residential and commercial buildings.

The use of the title "stationary engineer" predates other engineering designations and is not to be confused with professional engineer, a title typically given to design engineers in their given field. The job of today's engineer has been greatly changed by computers and automation as well as the replacement of steam engines on ships and trains. Workers have adapted to the challenges of the changing job market.

Today, stationary engineers are required to be significantly more involved with the technical aspect of the job, as many plants and buildings are updated with increasingly more automated systems of control valves and distributed control systems.

== History ==
The profession of stationary engineering emerged during the Industrial Revolution with the development of steam-powered pumps by Thomas Savery and Thomas Newcomen which were used to draw water from mines, and the industrial steam engines perfected by James Watt. Railroad engineers operated early steam locomotives and continue to operate trains today, as well as marine engineers, who operated the boilers on steamships. The certification and classification of stationary engineers was developed in order to reduce incidents of boiler explosions in the late 19th century. Notable individuals who worked as stationary engineers include George Stephenson, William Faulkner, and Henry Ford.

== Regulation ==
=== United States ===
In the United States power engineers are governed solely by their individual states, or by their specific municipalities. Several States, such as Maine have opted to align with Canada's guidelines regarding power engineering education, but this is not common. In the United States, stationary engineers must be licensed in several cities and states. The New York City Department of Buildings requires a Stationary Engineer's License to practice in the City of New York; to obtain the license one must pass a written and practical exam and have at least five years' experience working directly under a licensed stationary engineer, or one year if in possession of a Bachelor of Science degree in mechanical engineering. Holders of the Stationary Engineer's License primarily work in large power generation facilities, such as cogeneration power plants, peaking units, and large central heating and refrigeration plants (CHRPs). For the State of California, Stationary Engineers are the State of California Military Department's sole source of Airfield Lighting and Repair.

=== Canada ===
In Canada, power engineers are regulated by their respective jurisdictions, named below. Each province has a safety authority that is granted power through "enabling acts" and overseen by the Canadian Standards Association. Examinations and licensing in all 10 provinces and three territories are regulated by the Standardization of Power Engineers Examinations Committee (SOPEEC) who receives recommendations by the Interprovincial Power Engineering Curriculum Committee (IPECC).

==== Jurisdictional authorities ====
- Alberta Boilers Safety Association (ABSA)
- Technical Safety British Columbia (TSBC)
- Office of The Fire Commissioner
- Government of New Brunswick
- Government of Newfoundland and Labrador
- Northwest Territories
- Nova Scotia
- Nunavut
- Technical Standards and Safety Authority (TSSA)
- Government of Prince Edward Island
- Régie du bâtiment du Québec and Emploi-Québec (RBQ, EQ)
- Technical Safety Authority of Saskatchewan
- Yukon
