= Regulation and licensure in engineering =

Regulation and licensure in engineering is established by various jurisdictions of the world to encourage life, public welfare, safety, well-being, the environment and other interests of the general public and to define the licensure process through which an engineer becomes licensed to practice engineering and to provide professional services and products to the public.

As with many other professions and activities, engineering is often a restricted activity. Relatedly, jurisdictions that license according to particular engineering discipline define the boundaries of each discipline carefully so that practitioners understand what they are competent to do.

A licensed engineer takes legal responsibility for engineering work, product or projects (typically via a seal or stamp on the relevant design documentation) as far as the local engineering legislation is concerned. Regulations require that only a licensed engineer can sign, seal or stamp technical documentation such as reports, plans, engineering drawings and calculations for study estimate or valuation or carry out design analysis, repair, servicing, maintenance or supervision of engineering work, process or project. In cases where public safety, property or welfare is concerned, licensed engineers are trusted by the government and the public to perform the task in a competent manner. In various parts of the world, licensed engineers may use a protected title such as professional engineer, chartered engineer, or simply engineer.

== Legislative intent ==
It is illegal for a practicing engineer to jeopardize public safety in any way. This means that an engineer must adhere to the highest level of technical and moral conduct reasonable or suffer litigation if an engineering system fails causing harm to the public, including maintenance technicians. Breaches of engineering law are often sufficient grounds for enforcement measures, which may include the suspension or loss of license and financial penalties. They may also include imprisonment, should gross negligence be shown to have been a factor in loss of human life.

An engineering licence provides the public with the assurance that qualified persons are doing or overseeing engineering work. An unlicensed worker or manager has no specific liability, as this is borne by the employer through tort law or engineering legislation, and there is no regulatory authority to enforce acceptable engineering practice in relation to the work.

In cases of gross negligence, an engineering firm may not be considered vicariously liable for an individual engineer's offence.

== Licensure and regulation ==
Becoming a licensed engineer is a process that varies around the world but generally requires a four-year engineering degree and four years of engineering experience. In some regions, use of the term "engineer" is regulated, in others it is not. Where engineering is a regulated profession, there are specific procedures and requirements for obtaining a registration, charter or license to practice engineering. These are obtained from the government or a charter-granting authority acting on its behalf and engineers are subject to regulation by these bodies. In addition to licensure, there are voluntary certification programs for various disciplines which involve examinations accredited by the Council of Engineering and Scientific Specialty Boards.

Due to occupational closure, licensed engineers enjoy significant influence over their regulation. They are often the authors of the pertinent codes of ethics used by some of these organizations. Engineers in private practice most often find themselves in traditional professional-client relationships in their practice. Engineers employed in government service and government-run industry are on the other side of that relationship. Despite the different focus, engineers in industry and private practice face similar ethical issues and reach similar conclusions. One American engineering society, the National Society of Professional Engineers, has sought to extend a single professional license and code of ethics for all engineers, regardless of practice area or employment sector.

== Asia ==
=== People's Republic of China ===
China has two parallel systems for evaluating professional engineers, one as part of the "Professional Title" and the other as part of the "Occupation Qualification".

Under the "Professional Title" system, engineers are divided into Assistant Engineer, Engineer, and Senior Engineer. Professional titles are awarded based on educational background, work experience, performance, participation in training programs, and awards received.

Under the "Occupation Qualification" system, engineers are classified by their specific profession, such as "Registered Architect," "Registered Structural Engineer," "Registered Civil Engineer," "Registered Electrical Engineer," "Registered Public Equipment Engineer," etc. To obtain a registered engineer title, in addition to having a certain amount of work experience in a specific profession, one must pass a series of specific exams organized by the government.

Registered engineers must pass two levels of rigorous exams. Whether design documents or drawings need to be signed by registered engineers depends on provinces or cities.

To qualify, candidates must complete two levels of exams. The first level is an 8-hour close-book basic knowledge exam, covering courses of undergraduate engineering degrees. After passing this exam, participants can take the second-level professional exam the following year. This professional exam is divided into multiple disciplines, such as structural, architectural, electrical, and mechanical. It tests candidates' ability to understand and apply relevant codes and standards. The exam is conducted over a weekend, with each day featuring a 6-hour session. The first day's exam focuses on code requirements, while the second day's exam involves questions about actual engineering cases, requiring references to equations and performing calculations.

=== South Korea ===
In South Korea, engineering credentials are primarily structured through the national technical qualification system under the National Technical Qualifications Act, which classifies technical qualifications into five grades: professional engineer, master craftsman, engineer, industrial engineer, and craftsman. Within this hierarchy, the professional engineer (기술사, gisulsa) is the grade most analogous to a professional engineering licence in other jurisdictions, because it is separately governed by the Professional Engineers Act, which defines professional engineers' duties, permits the establishment of registered professional engineer offices, and requires registered practitioners to sign and seal designs and reports prepared in the course of practice.

Unlike jurisdictions that rely on a single broad P.E. title, South Korea divides the professional engineer grade into a large number of field-specific categories. Q-Net lists 84 professional engineer categories overall, including information-technology fields such as Professional Engineer Information Management and Professional Engineer Computer System Application.

Eligibility is experience-based and examination-centered. According to Q-Net, candidates typically qualify for the professional engineer examination through combinations of lower-tier qualifications, academic credentials, and substantial work experience; the examination process itself consists of a written examination followed by an interview. This differs from some U.S. licensure models, in which state boards or NCEES records may require professional references as part of the licensing process.

The examinations are also selective. For example, Q-Net reports that in 2024 the written-examination pass rate was 3.4% for Professional Engineer Information Management and 13.0% for Professional Engineer Computer System Application; the corresponding interview pass rates were 76.7% and 71.4%, respectively.

=== Iran ===
In Iran, registration or licensure of professional engineers and engineering practice is governed by Ministry of Science, Research and Technology (Iran). For standardization, FE and PE exams are written and graded by a central organization, the National Organization for Examination and Training (NOET) which is known as Sanjesh in Persian.

Requirements for licensing are as follows:

Graduate from accredited four-year college or university program with a degree in engineering (e.g., Bachelor of Engineering, Bachelor of Science in Engineering. Complete a standard Fundamentals of Engineering (FE) written examination, which tests applicants on breadth of understanding of basic engineering principles and, optionally, some elements of an engineering speciality. Accumulate a certain amount of engineering experience requirement is at least four years. Complete a written Principles and Practice in Engineering (PE) examination, which tests the applicant's knowledge and skills in their chosen engineering discipline (civil, electrical, industrial, mechanical, computer, etc.), as well as engineering ethics.

=== Pakistan ===
In Pakistan, engineering education and profession is regulated by the Pakistan Engineering Council (PEC) via PEC Act 1976. PEC is a federal government organization. Any person with an engineering degree (BE/BS/BSc Engineering) from PEC accredited universities/institutes is legally allowed to register with the Pakistan Engineering Council (PEC) as a Registered engineer (RE). Previously, every engineering graduate registered with the PEC and at least five years of relevant work experience was eligible for the title of professional engineer (PE) without any exam. To improve the quality of engineering profession, this two-tier system has been enhanced via PEC CPD Bye-Laws 2008. This system was realistically implemented starting 10 July 2010. Graduate engineers now enroll and practice as registered engineer (RE) in their general discipline of work. After at least five years of relevant work experience and accumulation of at least 17 CPD (Continued Professional Development) points, they may attempt the Engineering Practice Examination (EPE) conducted by the PEC. EPE is held by PEC biennially in major cities across the country. Those who pass the EPE are given the prestigious title of professional engineer (PE) in their specialized discipline of work.

To improve the quality of engineering services, engineers with professional engineer (PE) status are also required to engage in CPD activities in order to be able to retain their PE license. CPD points are awarded for various developmental activities such as formal education (e.g. Postgraduate diploma, master or PhD), on-job experience, participating in conferences/workshops as audience, speaker or organizer, publications in technical journals, part-time teaching activities, serving as guest lecturer (other than full-time teaching) and serving as external examiner for master/PhD thesis.

For CPD points system, upper limit of points has also been implemented to prevent abuse of the system and encourage balanced participation in various CPD activities. In case of on-job work experience which is the primary engagement of engineering profession, one CPD point is awarded for 400 hours of work. Upper limit of 2 credit points per year has been established for on-job work experience. Rewarding only 800 hours (~4 months full-time) of work per year has many benefits including inherent tolerance for bouts of unemployment, in-built allowance for sickness/disease/injury, discouraging workaholism, enabling full-time engineering teachers to gain relevant field experience with reduced time commitment (e.g. part-time consulting engagement) and encouraging participation in other CPD activities which further the engineering profession (e.g. guest lectures, publishing research, authoring a book and social work for engineers under recognized engineers' associations).

To avoid confusion, PEC CPD Bye-Laws 2008 introduced the legal term "registered person". Registered person is a term distinct from registered engineer (RE). It is a blanket term used for all persons enrolled with PEC in any capacity – whether as registered engineers (RE) or professional engineers (PE).

Mobility

In Pakistan, engineering is regulated at the federal level. Engineers recognized as registered engineer (RE) or professional engineer with PEC need not go through further process once they move to another province or territory within Pakistan. For structural engineers, registration with local building authority may be a further requirement depending upon the jurisdiction and local building code.

Washington Accord: Pakistan gained Observer status in Washington Accord in 2009, Provisional member in 2010 and became Full signatory on 21 June 2017. Pakistan was the 19th signatory ever to achieve this status.

IPEA & IntPE: Through clause 13 (h) of PEC CPD Bye-laws 2008, PEC was unilaterally honoring the Engineers Mobility Forum (EMF)/International Professional Engineers Agreement (IPEA) since 10 July 2010. An engineer already registered as a professional engineer with EMF/IPEA would be exempt from EPE & CPD points requirement and will be awarded professional engineer (PE) title on submission of application. On 29 June 2018, International Engineering Alliance (IEA) bestowed on PEC the authority to award IPE (IntPE) status to qualifying candidates. PEC developed the application framework and, since September 2020, began accepting applications through a dedicated IPEA portal on the PEC website.

=== Sri Lanka ===
In Sri Lanka, the title "engineer" is not regulated. However, as per the Engineering Council Act No 4 of 2017, all engineering practitioners in Sri Lanka needs to be registered with the engineering council to practice. Failing to do so would result in an offence and can be convicted by a summary trial before a Magistrate with imprisonment period not exceeding one year and/or a fine not exceeding one hundred thousand rupees.

== Europe ==
The designation European Engineer (EUR ING) is an international professional qualification and title for engineers in many European countries. The certificate for this is granted after successful application to a national member of Engineers Europe (previously named the European Federation of National Engineering Associations (FEANI)), an association of over 350 national engineering organisations from 33 countries (as of 2025).

=== Austria ===
Austria's nationally-based seat requirements for architects and engineers were criticised by the European Commission in 2016, as the Commission believed the requirements were not consistent with the EU's Services Directive of 2006.

=== Germany ===
The use of the job title engineer (Ingenieur in German) was not regulated until the 8th of July 1965. It was estimated that at this point there were 105 000 Engineers with academic degrees, 225 000 engineers with an academy or engineering school degree, and 30 000 self-styled engineers. Self-styled engineers could apply for an exception to continue to use the job title or had to cease to use the title within a certain time frame.

From that point on the typical ways to be allowed to use the job title engineer were to obtain the academic title of a diploma engineer Diplom-Ingenieur (abbreviated Dipl.-Ing.) or doctor engineer (Phd, Dr.-Ing.) from an academic institutions, or to obtain a graduated engineer title (Ingenieur (grad.)) from an engineering school or engineering academy. Earlier graduates from engineering schools or academies could continue to use the title or in some cases could change their title to Ingenieur (grad.). Mining schools were granting some engineer titles, too.

In the 1970s Germany converted its engineering schools and academies into universities of applied sciences and founded new such universities. With this change the Ingenieur (grad.) was no longer granted. Instead universities of applied sciences awarded the academic title of diploma engineer Diplom-Ingenieur, too. Over time, and depending on the actual state of the infighting between universities and universities of applied sciences, universities of applied sciences granted the title with a suffix Diplom-Ingenieur (FH).

Around the same time the federal states (Bundesländer) established their own engineer laws, because in Germany education is a matter of regulation for the federal states, not the federal government. These laws are all very similar and describe who is allowed to use the job title of an engineer.

Today (2023) the number of engineers with the academic title Diplom-Ingenieur, with or without a suffix, is on the decline. Germany adopted the Bologna Process and changed to a bachelor/master system with the respective academic titles. Only very few universities still provide diploma degree courses and grant an academic title with the word engineer (Ingenieur) in the title. For a doctorate the Dr.-Ing. is still awarded.

However, the use of the term Ingenieur continues to be protected even after the implementation of the bologna process. This also applies to translations and abbreviations. The group of people allowed to use the job title was actually widened. Typically since 2013 the engineer laws of the states allow persons who completed scientific or engineering studies of at least three years (e.g. bachelor, or the older diploma studies) at a German academic institution to use engineer as a job title. Also a lot of grandfather cases are covered, like engineers with a Ingenieur (grad.) title.

Further, the laws of the states contain provisions for the authorities to grant persons who obtained their engineering degree or title from a foreign institution or otherwise the right to use the job title. With special provisions for EU member states.

The state laws typically regard the unauthorized use of the job title engineer as a misdemeanor. § 132a of the criminal code of Germany makes the unauthorized use of an academic degree title a criminal offense punishable by up to one year of imprisonment or a fine.

==== Engineering chambers ====
Engineers offering certain engineering services need to be a member of an engineering chamber (Ingenieurkammer) by law. This is most commonly the case for freelance consulting (Beratender Ingenieur) activities in construction, but can also be required for other engineering work. Voluntary membership is also possible.

Engineering chambers are self-governing and provide services for their members.

==== Techniker ====
"State-certified engineer" (German: staatlich geprüfter Techniker) is a European Union qualification for a professional engineering technologist (not to be confused with an engineering technician or "Dipl.-Ing").

The certificate is granted to engineering technologists upon successful completion of a technical college and it is also granted by an international organization with headquarters in Germany, the "BVT", Federal Association of Higher Professions for Technology, Economy and Design (Bundesverband höherer Berufe der Technik, Wirtschaft und Gestaltung e.V.).

Techniker certificates have been grouped on the same level as academic bachelor's degrees in national (DFQ) and European Qualifications Framework (EFQ).

A member of the BVT is entitled to use the initials "BVT" after his name. To achieve this qualification, it is required to complete a 42-month apprenticeship program, a minimum 2,400 hour college diploma in engineering or technology, two years of relevant experience and pass the state examination. The academic requirement to be a state-certified engineer is a degree equivalent to level 6 on EQF = bachelor on the European Qualification Framework. A bachelor's (honours) degree in engineering or engineering technology from an accredited university is also equated to level 6 on EQF. A state-certified engineer is not required to complete a university degree. Before Jan. 31, 2012, a state-certified engineer certificate usually qualified the holder to proceed to bachelor's level education at a university of applied science. In the past, this led to wide and controversial discussions between bachelor's and master's degrees engineers and state-certified engineers.

Today, this is on the same level as a bachelor's degree. One can continue to study to a master's degree level to achieve SCE qualification. The academic requirements for qualification are similar to incorporated engineer qualification/registration by EC UK. State-certified engineers now assist engineers with only a diploma or master's degree. They are also holding full engineering positions as systems engineers, integration engineers, test engineers, QA engineers, etc.

State-certified engineer, business manager and designer levels are now a level 6–Bachelor on DQF and EQF, as of Jan. 31, 2012. The following top representatives and agents institutions were involved: federal government (Federal Ministry for Education and Research, Federal Ministry of Economics and Technology), standing conference and economic ministerial meeting of countries, the Confederation of German Employers' Associations, German Chambers of Industry and Commerce, German Trade Union Federation and the Federal Institute for Vocational Application. They agreed on a common position on the implementation of the EQF, as a German qualifications framework (DQR).

=== United Kingdom ===
"In general there is no restriction on the right to practise as an engineer in the UK. However there are a small number of areas of work, generally safety related, which are reserved by statute, regulations or industry standards to licensed or otherwise approved persons." The title "engineer" is not regulated, but certain engineering titles are. There is no system for licensing, but registers are held of qualified persons. The Engineering Council is the UK regulatory body for its engineering profession. It holds the national registers of 235,000 engineers registered as EngTech (engineering technicians), ICTTech (information and communications technology technicians), IEng (incorporated engineers) and CEng (chartered engineers). These titles are fully protected under law by means of the Engineering Council's royal charter and bylaws. In order to protect these titles, action is taken through the courts against their unauthorized use.

To receive designation as a CEng, it is required to have approved education (typically to Master's level) and also demonstrate significant technical and commercial leadership and management competencies.

A chartered engineer is entitled to register through Engineers Europe (formerly FEANI) as a European Engineer and use the pre-nominal designation EUR ING.

== North America ==
=== Canada ===
The practice of engineering in Canada is highly regulated under a system of licensing administered by a self regulated engineering association in each province. In Canada the designation "professional engineer" and "engineer" (including titles containing the word engineer and abbreviations such as P.Eng.) can only be used by licensed engineers and the practice of engineering is protected in law in all provinces. The regulation and licensing of engineers is done through each province's own engineering association which was created by acts passed by that province's legislature. There is also Engineers Canada which regulates undergraduate programs for engineering. The process for registration is generally as follows:

1. Qualify academically by one of two equally valid methods:
  1. Graduate with a degree from an accredited program in engineering or applied science, accredited by the Canadian Engineering Accreditation Board (CEAB).
  2. Graduate from a non-CEAB program with a minimum of two years education in engineering or a related study area plus the completion of a technical examination program.
2. Complete an engineer-in-training (EIT) or engineering internship program under the direction of a professional engineer. With the exception of Quebec, this is a minimum four-year program.
3. Review of work experience by the association.
4. Pass a professional practice exam, on engineering law the content and format of which differs by province. Many provinces require the National Professional Practice Examination (NPPE), which includes a significant component on ethics and professional practice; however, applicants with an accredited engineering degree who passed an ethics course may be exempt from this exam.

Professional engineers are not licensed in a specific discipline but are bound by their respective provincial engineering legislation (e.g. in Ontario: Professional Engineers Act R.R.O. 1990, Regulation 941, Section 72) from practicing beyond their training and experience. Breaches of the code are often sufficient grounds for enforcement measures, which may include the suspension or loss of license and financial penalties. It could also result in serving time jail, should negligence be shown to have played a part in any incident that causes loss of human life.

Engineers are not tested on technical knowledge during the licensing process if their education was accredited by the CEAB. Accreditation of schools and their accredited degree granting status are monitored and controlled. This accreditation process is governed by Engineers Canada through their active group CEAB.

The accreditation process is continuous and enforced through regular accreditation reviews of each school. These reviews typically include the review of the school's curriculum (including marked final exams and assignments), interviews of current students, extracurricular activities and teaching staff as well additional areas the visiting board may feel need addressing. The specific areas considered are curriculum content, program environment and general criteria. The associations are granted both an exclusive right to title and an exclusive right to practice. A professional engineer is legally required to be licensed in most provinces. The level of enforcement varies depending on the specific industry but often a complaint needs to be filed for regulatory action to commence.

The professional engineer's license is only valid in the province of delivery. There are, however, agreements between the associations to ease mobility. In 2009, professional engineers Ontario led an initiative to develop a national engineering licensing framework.

The term "engineer" is often used loosely in some Canadian industry sectors to describe people working in the field of engineering technology—not professional engineering—as engineering technologists or engineering technicians and trades names such as stationary engineer. For example, the Canadian Coast Guard and the Canadian Navy often calls its technicians "marine engineers," "power engineers" and "military engineers" internally, but not in the public domain. The term "locomotive engineer" has been an integral part of the Canadian railroad since its inception. "Stationary engineering" is a trade whose technicians operate heavy machinery and equipment that provide heat, light, climate control and power.

=== United States ===
In the United States, registration or licensure of professional engineers and engineering practice is governed by the individual states. Each registration or license is valid only in the state where it is granted. Some licensed engineers maintain licenses in more than one state. Comity, also known as reciprocity, between states allows engineers who are licensed or registered in one state to obtain a license in another state without meeting the ordinary rigorous proof of qualification by testing. This is accomplished by the second state recognizing the validity of the first state's licensing or registration process.

==== History ====
Licensure in the United States began in the State of Wyoming when lawyers, notaries and others without engineering education were making poor quality submissions to the state for permission to use state water for irrigation. Clarence Johnson, the Wyoming state engineer, presented a bill in 1907 to the state legislature that required registration for anyone presenting themselves as an engineer or land surveyor and created a board of examiners. Charles Bellamy, a 52-year-old engineer and mineral surveyor then became the first licensed professional engineer in the United States. After enactment, Johnson would wryly write about the effect of the law, saying, "A most astonishing change took place within a few months in the character of maps and plans filed with the applications for permits." Louisiana, followed by Florida and Illinois, would become the next states to require licensure. Montana became the last state to legislate the licensing in 1947, except Hawaii.

==== Requirements ====
Requirements for licensing vary, but generally are as follows:

1. Graduate from an Accreditation Board for Engineering and Technology (ABET)-accredited four-year college or university program with a degree in engineering (e.g., Bachelor of Engineering, Bachelor of Science in engineering, Master of Science in engineering, Master of Engineering) or in some states, graduate from an ABET-accredited four-year college or university program with a degree in engineering technology. Most states require that a program be accredited by the Engineering Accreditation Commission (EAC) of ABET to satisfy this education component of licensure, however, some states also accept programs accredited by the Engineering Technology Accreditation Commission (ETAC) of ABET.
2. Complete a standard Fundamentals of Engineering (FE) written examination, which tests applicants on breadth of understanding of basic engineering principles and, optionally, some elements of an engineering speciality. Completion of the first two steps typically qualifies applicants for certification in the United States as an engineer in training (EIT), sometimes also called an engineer intern (EI).
3. Accumulate a certain amount of engineering experience: in most states the requirement is four years, but it is lower in some. For engineering technology graduates, the required number of years may be higher.
4. Complete a written Principles and Practice in Engineering (PE) examination, which tests the applicant's knowledge and skills in their chosen engineering discipline (civil, electrical, industrial, mechanical, etc.), as well as engineering ethics.

For standardization, FE and PE exams are written and graded by a central organization, the National Council of Examiners for Engineering and Surveying (NCEES). However, each state's board of professional engineers individually sets the requirements to take the exams, as well as the passing score. For example, applicants in some states must provide professional references from several PEs before they can take the PE exam. There is a fairly large range in exam pass rates for FE and PE exams, but the pass rate for repeat test takers is significantly lower.

All 50 states and the District of Columbia have engineering boards that are represented on the NCEES, which administers both the FE and PE examinations.

Degree requirements in the United States are evolving. Effective January 1, 2020, the NCEES model will require additional credits beyond a Bachelor of Science in Engineering degree. NCEES is developing the types of creditable activities that will satisfy the additional educational requirement. This has received some support from civil engineers.

As of 2023, it is still possible for an individual to bypass Steps No. 2 and 4. In Texas, for example, FE exam waivers are still available to individuals with several years of creditable experience.

In a few states, it is still possible for an individual to bypass Step No. 1 and apply to take the registration examinations—as long as a PE sponsors the applicant—because work experience can be substituted for academic experience. The requirement for years of experience may also vary. For example, in California it is possible to take a PE examination with only two years of experience after a Bachelor of Science in Engineering degree or one year of experience after a Master of Engineering. In other states candidates may take one of the PE exams directly through NCEES, in some cases immediately after graduation, but they still must wait until obtaining the required experience before obtaining a license. Some states also have state-specific examinations. California requires two additional exams in land surveying and earthquake engineering for civil engineering candidates and many states have exams based on their individual laws and ethics requirements.

Some states issue generic professional engineering licenses. Others, known as "discipline states", issue licenses for specific disciplines of engineering, such as civil engineering, mechanical engineering, nuclear engineering, electrical engineering and chemical engineering. However, in all cases engineers are ethically required to limit their practice to their area of competency, which is usually a small portion of a discipline. While licensing boards do not often enforce this limitation, it can be a factor in negligence lawsuits. In a few states, licensed civil engineers may also perform land survey work.

In addition to the person's license, most states require that firms providing engineering services are authorized to do so. For instance, the state of Florida requires businesses offering engineering services to be registered with the state and have a Florida licensed professional engineer qualify the business.

Civil engineers account for a large portion of licensed professional engineers. In Texas, for example, about 37 percent of licenses are for civil engineers, with civil engineering exams making up more than half of the exams taken. Many of the remainder are mechanical, electrical and structural engineers. However, some engineers in other fields obtain licenses for the ability to serve as professional witnesses in courts, before government committees or just for prestige—even though they may never actually sign and seal design documents.

Areas that include much of mechanical, aerospace and chemical engineering may be specifically exempted from regulation under an "industrial exemption". The industrial exemption varies from state to state. An industrial exemption covers engineers who design products such as automobiles that are sold (or have the potential to be sold) outside the state where they are produced, as well as the equipment used to produce the product. Structures subject to building codes are not covered by an industrial exemption, though small residential buildings often do not require an engineer's seal. In some jurisdictions, the role of architects and structural engineers overlap. In general, the primary professional responsible for designing habitable buildings is an architect. The architect signs and seals design plans for buildings and other structures that humans may occupy. A structural engineer is contracted to provide technical structural design ensuring the stability and safety of the overall structure, however, no states currently allow engineers the ability to perform professional architecture without also being licensed as an architect.

Many private companies employ non-degree workers in technical positions with engineering titles such as "test engineer" or "field engineer". At the company's discretion, as long as the company does not offer engineering services directly to the public or other businesses, such positions may not require an engineering license.

However, it is important to make a distinction between a "graduate engineer" and a "professional engineer". A "graduate engineer" is anyone holding a degree in engineering from an accredited four-year university program, but is not licensed to practice or offer services to the public. Unlicensed engineers usually work as employees for a company or as professors in engineering colleges, where they are governed under the industrial exemption clause.

== Designations ==
Letters after or before a person's name (post-nominal or pre-nominal letters) are commonly used to denote the holder of an engineering license in various jurisdictions:

=== Africa ===
- Ing. in Ghana (for engineers holding a BSc or higher with relevant engineering experience) and a registered member of the Ghana Institute of Engineers (GhIE)
- Pr Eng or Pr Ing is used as a post-nominal in South Africa (for engineers holding a BEng, BSc.Eng. or B.Ing. with relevant experience). Pr.Cert.Eng., standing for professional certificated engineer is used as a post-nominal for engineers who have registered with the Engineering Council of South Africa after passing the Engineers Certificate of Competence Examinations.
- R.Eng. standing for registered engineer in Kenya (holders of five years of post-secondary engineering education and four years of work experience).
- Eng. is used for engineers holding the Bachelor of Science, Bachelor of Engineering (or higher) with relevant engineering experience in Egypt and must be a member in the Egyptian Syndicate of Engineers.
- Engr is used as a pre-nominal in Nigeria (for holders of bachelor or higher degree in engineering with relevant experience and having successfully passed the Nigerian Society of Engineers (NSE) Professional Exams and fulfill other NSE and Council for Regulation of Engineering in Nigeria (COREN) requirements)"
- REng or CEng is used as post-nominal for registered engineers in Nigeria after fulfilling both NSE and COREN requirements.
- Eng is used as a pre-nominal in Uganda for registered engineers. In Uganda, a registered engineer must as a prerequisite be a member of the Uganda Institution of professional engineers (UIPE) and must have a Bachelor of Science (or higher) in engineering together with relevant engineering experience that must be documented, supported by two registered engineers and defended by the applicant in an interview with the Engineers' Registration Board (ERB), which has the power to confirm designation as a registered engineer. Annual fees must be paid to the ERB by all registered engineers.

=== Australia and New Zealand ===
- RPEng stands for Registered Professional Engineer of Professionals Australia. Assessed by Professionals Australia.
- CPEng stands for Chartered Professional Engineer. Assessed by Engineers Australia and Engineering New Zealand.
- NER stands for National Engineering Register, administered by Engineers Australia.
- RPEQ stands for Registered Professional Engineer of Queensland and is required by all engineers within Queensland, and any engineers doing work for Queensland. It is subject to CPD requirements to maintain status. Administered by the Board of Professional Engineers of Queensland.
- RPEV (Registered Professional Engineer of Victoria ) awarded by BLA (Business Licensing Authority) and evaluated by AusIMM (The Australasian Institute of Mining and Metallurgy) and CIBSE (Chartered Institution of Building Services Engineers).
- Graduate Engineer is an official designation under Australian Legislation (Professional Employees Award 2010) that covers graduated engineering students of a suitable engineering course.
- Professional Engineer and Experienced Engineer are official designations under Australian Legislation (Professional Employees Award 2010) for engineers that carry out professional engineering duties and; are a member of Engineers Australia; or are a graduate engineer with 4 years experience with professional engineering duties; or are who have not graduated from a university course, but are an engineer with five years experience carrying out professional engineering duties as would be the case for autodidactic and industry-trained engineers.

=== Asia ===
- Mohandess Payeh 1 and Mohandess Payeh 2 are titles used respectively for professional engineer and engineer-in-training in Iran.
- Ir is used as a pre-nominal in Hong Kong, Malaysia and Indonesia.
- Er is used as a pre-nominal in Singapore and P.E./P.Eng. ( professional engineer ) are used as post-nominal designations.
- P.E.Jp. as a pre-nominal in Japan.
- Engr. or engineer is allowed before your name only if you have membership in IEB, in Bangladesh.
- R.E. and P.E. are used as post-nominal designations for engineers in Pakistan registered with the Pakistan Engineering Council (PEC) after completing a four years Bachelor of Engineering/Bachelor of Science in Engineering degree. R.E. (registered engineer) and P.E. (professional engineer)
- Mohandes is used as a pre-nominal in Arab countries like Iraq, Syria and Lebanon.
- Eng. or .م as a pre-nominal in Jordan (for engineers holding a university degree in engineering after five years of studies).
- Engr. or engineer is used as a pre-nominal in the Philippines for individuals passing the government regulated professional licensure examination, which is only given for certain fields of engineering.
- CEng (Sri Lanka) is used in Sri Lanka as a post-nominal abbreviation by corporate members of the Institution of Engineers, Sri Lanka (IESL).
- IEng. The term incorporated engineers is offered by the Institution of Incorporated Engineers, Sri Lanka.
- CEng (India) is used as post-nominal abbreviation in India by those who are registered as a chartered engineer with Institution of Engineers (India).
- Er is used before their name by chartered engineers who hold the IE [India] designation, in India.
- אינג is used in Israel mostly by master's degree civil engineers.

=== Europe ===
- EUR ING (European Engineer) in Europe, used as a pre-nominal (similar to Dr or Prof.) after being suitably registered in their own country and then accepted by Engineers Europe.
- Ing. (ingeniero) in Spain, used as a pre-nominal, for the engineers who have the equivalent to a master's degree as they studied five or six courses in an engineering superior school. There also exists an ingeniero técnico (I.T.), who is a professional that holds a degree and has taken a minimum of three courses in an official engineering college. Both types of engineers have full competency in their respective professional field of engineering, the difference being that the three-year engineers have competence only in their specialty (mechanical, electrical, chemical, etc.) and the "engineering superior school" engineers have wider competences. The Bologna process changes this structure. The degree will require four courses and the superior engineering school engineers will equal the ones that hold a master's in engineering.
- Eng. (Engenheiro) in Portugal, used as a pre-nominal. An engenheiro is a full chartered professional in engineering who was awarded a master's degree (second study cycle according to the Bologna process system) by an accredited engineering school. In Portugal there is also the engenheiro técnico who is a professional with a bachelor's degree (first study cycle) in engineering or engineering sciences. Accredited master's degrees in engineering are regulated and certified by the Ordem dos Engenheiros (Order of Engineers) and every professional full chartered engineer is registered at the Ordem.
- In Finland, regulation affects only academic degrees. In academic education, the degree of diplomi-insinööri (dipl. ins. or DI), officially translated "Master of Science (Technology)", is awarded by universities and universities of technology and is preceded by an intermediate bachelor's degree (tekniikan kandidaatti) or equivalent studies. In vocational education, the degrees insinööri and ylempi insinööri (amk) are awarded by polytechnics.
- In Germany the Dipl.-Ing. pre-nominal (from Diplom-Ingenieur, engineer diploma) is awarded by the educational ministries of the federal states after completing an academic engineering education according to the German engineer's law. The pre-nominals Ing. grad. (graduierter Ingenieur, graduate engineer) and Obering. (Oberingenieur, supervisor engineer) are no longer awarded.
- State-certified Engineer BVT is the authorized translation (by the German Federal Government) of staatlich geprüfter Techniker.
- Ir. is used as a pre-nominal in the Netherlands (for engineers holding a master's degree from a university) or Ing. (for engineers holding a bachelor's degree from a professional school).
- Ir. is used as a pre-nominal in Belgium (for civil engineers holding a master's degree in engineering/bio-engineering sciences from a university) or Ing. (for industrial engineers holding a master's degree in applied engineering, formerly from university colleges; from 2013 these formations are integrated in the universities).
- Ing. in Italy used as a pre-nominal (for engineers holding a master's degree ) or Ing.jr. (for engineers holding a bachelor's degree). A state exam is required. Registration is with the Consiglio Nazionale degli Ingegneri.
- Siv. Ing. (sivilingeniør, Master of Science) and ing. (høyskoleingeniør, Bachelor of Science) in Norway. The title is used by persons holding degrees from accredited engineering colleges and universities.
- CEng (chartered engineer) and IEng (incorporated engineer) post-nominals are used in the UK and Ireland. UK and Irish engineers may also carry post-nominal letters specific to their specialist engineering institute, such as MIET (Member of the Institution of Engineering and Technology). In the UK these are recognized as regulated qualifications and titles.
- Civ. Ing. in Sweden (for engineers holding a master's degree in engineering, Master of Engineering, Master of Science in Engineering) and högskoleingenjör in Sweden (for engineers holding a Bachelor of Science degree).
- Cand.polyt. in Denmark (for engineers holding a master's degree in engineering, Master of Engineering, Master of Science in engineering).
- Ing. in Romania, used as a pre-nominal (similar to Dr. or Prof.).
- Ing. for engineers holding a master's degree in Czech Republic and Slovak republic, used as a pre-nominal.
- inż. and mgr. inż. in Poland for engineers with a bachelor's degree (inżynier, engineer) and a master's degree (magister inżynier, master engineer) respectively. The master's degree can be obtained in two years post-graduate education or formerly (until full adaptation of the Bologna process by universities) or through an integrated five-year Bachelor of Science/Master of Science program. Some (particularly in the US) mistakenly believe that mgr. inż. is some kind of separate degree, while in fact these are two degrees, regardless of how they were obtained. The degree in general includes license to practice, although some regulation may require additional registration to perform specific tasks.
- маг. инж. (master engineer) is as a pre-nominal in Bulgaria for engineers holding a master's degree) or инж. for engineers holding a bachelor's degree.
- Inġ. in Malta for engineers holding a university degree and at least three years of experience.
- BVT in Germany (for engineers holding three-and-a-half years of certified apprenticeship, followed by a minimum of a 2,400-hour degree and a minimum of two years of approved relevant experience, members of the federal Association of Higher Professionals for Technology, Economy and Design).
- Müh. or 'Mühendis is the title used in Turkey by someone holding a four-year degree from an accredited engineering university.
- Διπλωματούχος Μηχανικός (diploma owner in engineering) or Διπλ. Μηχ. is used in Greece as the title of someone holding a five-year degree from a public engineering university. This distinguished them from engineers having four years of studies in a Greek Technical Educational Institute.

=== Latin America ===
- Ing. is used as a pre-nominal in most Spanish speaking countries, including: Argentina, Bolivia, Colombia, Dominican Republic, Ecuador, El Salvador, Honduras, Mexico, Peru, Uruguay and Venezuela.
- In Chile, customary practice consists in placing the post-nominal term ingeniero civil plus the specialty area, such as ingeniero civil eléctrico.
- Eng. (engenheiro) is used in Brazil, or post-nominal terms specifying a specialty such as: engenheiro civil.
- R.Eng registered engineer in Trinidad and Tobago, as accredited by the Board of Engineering of Trinidad and Tobago.

=== North America ===
- PE or P.E. is used in the United States. Individual states grant PE registration, which can sometimes be endorsed by other states.
- SE or S.E. is used by some U.S. jurisdictions that license engineers in specific disciplines to designate individuals as professional structural engineers.
- P.Eng. is used in Canada, including the province of Quebec. This is a regulated title, and requires licensing.
- Eng. (French: ing.) is used in Quebec (professional engineers in Quebec may use either Eng., P.Eng. or ing., which are all equivalent).

== Title usage ==
In many countries, laws exist that limit the use of job titles containing the word "engineer".

=== Canada ===
In Canada it is illegal to practice engineering or use the title "professional engineer" or "engineer", without a license. There are two exceptions—stationary engineer and power engineer. Engineering in Canada is regulated in the public interest by self-governing professional licensing bodies. These bodies were established by Canada's 13 provincial and territorial governments through legislation. The provincial and territorial governments have delegated their constitutional authority to regulate engineers and engineering in Canada to professional licensing bodies that are maintained and governed by the profession, creating a system of self-regulation.

The first law related to professional engineering in Ontario was created in 1922 and allowed for the creation of a voluntary association to oversee registration of engineers. The Act of 1922 was "open", meaning that membership in the association was not mandatory for practising engineers. In Ontario, regulation of engineering practice dates to 1937, when the Professional Engineers Act was amended and the engineering profession was "closed" to non-qualified individuals; that is, licensure was made mandatory for anyone practising professional engineering. The provincial government determined that it would be in the public interest to restrict the practice of engineering to those who were qualified and the right to practice was "closed" to non-engineers as a result of the failures of bridges and buildings, which had been designed by unskilled individuals.

Canadian provinces legally allow engineers to self-regulate their profession. The licensing bodies fulfil this mandate by ensuring standards of engineering practice and education in Canada, by setting standards for admission into the profession, by disciplining engineers who fail to uphold the profession's practice and ethical standards and by preventing the misuse of the title professional engineer by individuals who are not licensed members of the profession. They also take appropriate action to prevent the illegal practice of engineering by unlicensed individuals. Each licensing body's mandate and obligation to undertake this role is laid out in the act that created it. Although each act is slightly different, most also define a scope of practice for engineers and specifically restrict the use of the title professional engineer to individuals who have been licensed by the engineering licensing body in the province or territory where the act applies.

The use of the term engineer was an issue between professional bodies, the IT industry and the security industry, where companies or associations may issue certifications or titles with the word engineer as part of that title (such as security engineer or Microsoft Certified Systems Engineer). Microsoft has since changed the title to "Microsoft Certified IT Professional". Several licensing bodies for professional engineering contend that only licensed professional engineers are legally allowed to use the title engineer. The IT industry, on the other hand, counters that:

1. These title holders never presented themselves as professional engineers
2. Provincial laws, other than in Quebec and Ontario, regulate only the use of term professional engineer and not any title with the word engineer; in Quebec and Ontario, the term engineer is protected by both the Engineers Act and by Section 32 of the Professional Code
3. The IT industry has used the term engineer since the dawn of the computing industry in the 60s.

Court rulings regarding the usage of the term engineer have been mixed. For example, after complaints were lodged by the Canadian Council of Professional Engineers, a court in Quebec fined Microsoft Canada $1,000 for misusing the "engineer" title by referring to MCSE graduates as engineers. Conversely an Alberta court dismissed the lawsuit filed by The Association of Professional Engineers, Geologists and Geophysicists of Alberta (APEGGA) against Raymond Merhej for using the title "system engineer," claiming that, 'The respondent's situation is such that it cannot be contended that the public is likely to be deceived, confused or jeopardized by his use of the term...'" APEGGA also lost the appeal to this decision.

The Canadian Information Processing Society, and in particular CIPS Ontario, have attempted to strike a balance between the professional engineering licensing bodies and the IT industry over the use of the term engineer in the software industry, but so far no major agreements or decisions have been announced.

Additional confusion has taken place over similarly-named occupations. One such example is power engineers or stationary engineers. Graduates of a two-year college level power engineering technology program in Nova Scotia may use the title power engineer or stationary engineer. This conflicts with the title often used in the electrical industry for professional engineers who design related equipment and can cause confusion.

=== Europe and Latin America ===
- Regulation and titling of engineers in Europe are handled differently by various countries.
- In Germany and some other European and Latin American countries, the term diploma engineer implies that the person has completed typically one year of academic work beyond the basic Bachelor of Engineering degree and completed a major academic project, similar to a master's thesis. Therefore, a diploma engineer is a university degree and not a professional registration or license. However, in Germany and most other countries where the diploma engineer degree exist, there is no professional registration or license in engineering (with a very limited number of exceptions, such as civil engineering in Germany). For this reason, graduates holding these degrees are generally allowed to use the legally protected title of "engineer" within these countries. In Germany the usage of the term engineer (Ingenieur) as such, not just the Diplom-Ingenieur, is protected by various Länder (states of Germany) laws—because education matters are governed by the legislation of the Länder, not the federal government. Although the details of the laws vary, they all properly restrict the usage of the term. Examples of such laws are listed in the endnotes.
- In France, the title engineer is used liberally and is often attributed based on professional position rather than initial qualification. However, the title ingénieur diplômé (diploma engineer) is reserved for people having followed one of the trainings listed by the Commission des Titres d'Ingénieur (Commission for Engineer Titles). It corresponds to a highly selective master's degree level.
- In Turkey use of the title is limited by several laws to people with an engineering degree from an accredited higher education institution or university. Engineering and architecture professions and related titles are governed by Law No. 3458, which came into effect in 1938. There are also several laws for each of the engineering branches. Usage of the "mühendis" (engineer in Turkish) title by others (even those with much more work experience) is illegal and punishable by law.
- In Chile, the ingeniero (engineer) title is regulated by law, which distinguishes at least three different kinds of professional engineering titles. First, the igeniería de ejecución, which only requires a degree in applied science and a technical degree from a university or a technical institute (usually four years total). Second, ingeniería, which requires a major degree in basic sciences plus a technical degree, both from a university (usually five years total). Third, ingeniería civil, which requires an academic major degree in basic sciences, a minor degree in applied sciences and a technical degree, all from a university (usually six or six and a half years total). In all cases, the term refers to a professional degree conceded by an educational institution, yet it can only be given by certain institutions when all legal requirements are met.
- In Brazil, the title of engenheiro (engineer)—and in Argentina, the title of ingeniero—can only be legally used by someone with a five- or six-year engineering degree. In Argentina most universities have a five- or six-year engineering degree (Around 3,500–4,000 hours of classes or approx. 240–250 credits, where one credit equals 16 contact hours). Both countries concede the degree most commonly through universities and sometimes through certain institutions.
- In Puerto Rico, use of the title ingeniero (engineer) is restricted to those holding an engineer's license registered by the Puerto Rico Professional College of Engineers and Land Surveyors. These people have the right to add the prefix Ing. before their names on resumes, business cards and other communication.

=== United Kingdom ===
There is no restriction on anyone describing themselves as an engineer or working as an engineer in the UK. The word engineer has a broad sense and can refer to multiple different jobs associated with engineering. Specific titles, however, are protected. In addition to professional engineering titles, these include Registered Gas Engineer and Chief Engineer Class 1 [or 2] Fishing Vessel.

The Engineering Council grants the titles Chartered Engineer, Incorporated Engineer, Engineering Technician and Information and Communications Technology Technician under its royal charter. These titles are protected under civil law. The Engineering Council is also the UK member of the International Professional Engineers Agreement and awards the title of International Professional Engineer (UK).

Various engineering institutions grant their own professional titles in addition to those granted by the Engineering Council. These include Chartered Chemical Engineer (Institution of Chemical Engineers), Chartered Mechanical Engineer (Institution of Mechanical Engineers), Chartered Civil Engineer (Institution of Civil Engineers), Chartered Energy Engineer and Chartered Petroleum Engineer (Energy Institute), Chartered Gas Engineer (Institution of Gas Engineers and Managers), Chartered Marine Engineer (Institute of Marine Engineering, Science and Technology), Chartered Structural Engineer (Institution of Structural Engineers), and Member of the Institution of Engineering and Technology (Institution of Engineering and Technology).

=== United States ===
In the United States, the practice of professional engineering is highly regulated and the title "professional engineer" is legally protected, meaning that it is unlawful to use it to offer engineering services to the public unless permission, certification or other official endorsement is specifically granted by that state through a professional engineering license. Also, many states prohibit unlicensed persons from calling themselves an "engineer" or indicating branches or specialties not covered by the licensing acts. Employees of state or federal agencies may also call themselves engineers if that term appears in their official job title. The IEEE's formal position on this is as follows: "The title, engineer and its derivatives should be reserved for those individuals whose education and experience qualify them to practice in a manner that protects public safety. Strict use of the title serves the interest of both the IEEE-USA and the public by providing a recognized designation by which those qualified to practice engineering may be identified."

Every state regulates the practice of engineering to ensure public safety by granting only Professional Engineers (PEs) the authority to sign and seal engineering plans and offer their services to the public. There are additional requirements to include at least one professional engineer within the firm for these types of companies to include the word engineering in the title of the business, although these requirements are not universal.

In the United States an "industrial exemption" allows businesses to employ employees and call them an "engineer", as long as such individuals are under the direct supervision and control of the business entity and function internally related to manufacturing (manufactured parts) related to the business entity or work internally within an exempt organization. Such person does not have the final authority to approve or the ultimate responsibility for, engineering designs, plans or specifications that are to be: (A) incorporated into fixed works, systems or facilities on the property of others; or (B) made available to the public. These individuals are prohibited from representing an ability or willingness to perform engineering services or make an engineering judgment requiring a licensed professional engineer, engage in practice of engineering, offer engineering services directly to the public and/or other businesses; unless the business entity is registered with the state's board of engineering and the practice is carried on/supervised directly only by engineers licensed to engage in the practice of engineering. Examples are sanitation engineer, production engineer, test engineer, network engineer, project engineer, systems engineer and sales engineer. These are often seen in engineering job advertisements online and in news papers. Most of the advertisements and employers do not require licensing because these positions do not pose a direct threat to public health or pose a liability danger.

The US model has generally been only to require the practicing engineers offering engineering services that impact the public welfare, safety or safeguarding of life, health or property to be licensed, while engineers working in private industry without a direct offering of engineering services to the public or other businesses, education and government need not be licensed.

In the United States, use of the title professional engineer is restricted to those holding a professional engineer's license. These people have the right to add the letters PE after their names on resumes, business cards and other communication. However, each state has its own licensing procedure and the license is valid only in the state that granted it. Therefore, many professional engineers maintain licenses in more than one state. Comity, also known as reciprocity, between states allows engineers who are licensed or registered in one state to obtain a license in another state without meeting the ordinary rigorous proof of qualification by testing. This is accomplished by the second state recognizing the validity of the first state's licensing or registration process.

Other uses of the term engineer are legally controlled and protected to varying degrees, dependent on the state and the enforcement of its engineering certification board. The term is frequently applied to fields where practitioners may have no engineering background or the work has no basis in the physical engineering disciplines; for example sanitation engineer.

With regard to the term "software engineer", many states, such as Texas and Florida, have introduced license requirements for such a title that are in line with the requirements for more traditional engineering fields.

== Complaints process ==
Generally engineering regulatory bodies will not launch an investigation without a complaint form being filled out by an individual. The complaint will be the basis of an investigation into professional misconduct, breach of contract or negligence.

== Disciplinary committees ==
California law dictates disciplinary proceedings by the Board for Professional Engineers, Land Surveyors, and Geologists against a licensed engineer who has committed deceit, misrepresentation, negligence, or a contract violation. The Professional Engineers of Ontario have a disciplinary committee that hears complaints of professional misconduct and incompetence. A discipline committee may suspend a certificate of authorization (firm license) for an engineering corporation or an engineering license or issue a fine for violations of local engineering legislation, such as professional misconduct, deceit, misrepresentation, negligence, or violation of a contract.

== Cost engineering ==
The AACE, a professional body for cost engineers, explains why a technical engineering background is not required for their profession with the following statement:

The skills and knowledge required to deal with costs (e.g., cost estimating, planning and scheduling, etc.) are quite different from those required to deal with the physical design dimension. From that difference, the field of cost engineering was born. Cost engineering practitioners work alongside of and are peers with engineers, software analysts, play producers, architects and other creative career fields to handle the cost dimension, but they do not necessarily have the same background. Whether they have technical, operations, finance and accounting or other backgrounds, cost engineering practitioners need to share a common understanding, based on "scientific principles and techniques," with the engineering or other creative career functions.

== See also ==
- American Society of Civil Engineers
- Chartered Physicist
- Civil Engineering Body of Knowledge
- Engineering New Zealand
- Engineers Australia
- FIDIC
- Hong Kong Institution of Engineers
- Institution of Electronics and Telecommunication Engineers
- Institution of Engineers (disambiguation)
- Institution of Mechanical Engineers
- Society of Operations Engineers
