= Engineering Council =

Organisation

- Nickname: EngC
- Formation: 27 November 1981
- Legal status: Registered charity
- Purpose: UK regulatory body for the engineering profession
- Location: London, EC2
- Region served: Worldwide
- Members: Professional engineering institutions (PEIs)
- Chief Executive: Paul Bailey
- Main organ: Board of trustees (chairman - John Chudley)
- Affiliations: EngineeringUK, Enginuity, National Apprenticeship Service, ENGINEERS EUROPE, SEFI
- Website: engc.org.uk

The Engineering Council (formerly Engineering Council UK; colloquially known as EngC) is the UK's regulatory authority for registration of Chartered and Incorporated engineers and engineering technician. The Engineering Council holds the national registers of over 228,000 Engineering Technicians (EngTech), Incorporated Engineers (IEng), Chartered Engineers (CEng) and Information and Communications Technology Technicians (ICTTech). The Engineering Council is also responsible for establishing and upholding globally acknowledged benchmarks of professional competence and ethical conduct, which govern the award and retention of these titles. This guarantees that employers, government bodies, and the broader society, both within the UK and abroad, can place their trust in the expertise, experience, and dedication of engineers and technicians who are professionally registered with the Engineering Council.

== History ==
Professional engineering institutions in the UK began in 1818 with the formation of the Institution of Civil Engineers. The IMechE was formed next in 1847. The IEE (Later Renamed as IET) was formed in 1871. These three are known as the Big Three institutions since together they represent 80% of registered UK engineers.

The Joint Council of Engineering Institutions was formed in 1964, which later became the Council of Engineering Institutions (CEI) in November 1965, which had a royal charter. This provided functions similar to those that the current Engineering Council and EngineeringUK currently carry out, as well as some others. Around this time, 33% of the UK's GDP was in manufacturing, lowering to 29% in the early 1970s.

=== Finniston report ===
A royal commission, from the committee of inquiry into the engineering profession, chaired by Sir Monty Finniston, was set up in 1977. It looked at the formation and registration of engineers, producing the Finniston Report - Engineering our Future in 1980. Engineering institutions thought they may have lost their autonomy. There was also the possibility of statutory licensing (direct government control) of engineers, as other professional practitioners such as doctors and architects, but the work of engineers is more confined to work with other engineering companies, providing a nominal level of inherent professional self-regulation against misconduct. Keith Joseph at the DTI chose not to have a statutory body, but have a royal charter.

From its recommendations, the Engineering Council was established in 1981, watching over 54 separate institutions. It gained a royal charter on 27 November 1981. The first chairman was Sir Kenneth Corfield, followed by Francis Tombs, Baron Tombs in 1985, Sir William Barlow in 1988, Sir John Fairclough in 1991, Dr. Alan Rudge in 1996 and Dr. Robert Hawley in 1999.

It formed the WISE Campaign in 1983 to encourage women to become engineers. In 1996, the diamond logo was replaced by a circle.

== Function ==
Engineering Council is recognised by the British Government as the national representative body of the engineering profession in the United Kingdom, working in partnership with other engineering institutions. The Engineering Council regulates the professions of chartered engineer, incorporated engineer and engineering technician in the UK.

== Professional registration in the UK ==
UK legislation is generally 'permissive' and, as such, the title engineer is not protected by law therefore anyone can call themselves an engineer or professional engineer or registered engineer and many semi-skilled and unskilled trades adopt this title. However the 'professional' titles awarded by the Engineering Council are protected by law. Registration as chartered and incorporated engineers or as engineering technicians is voluntary and candidates are required to demonstrate a high standard of professional competence acquired through education, training and responsible experience in order to register. There are four categories of registration:

- Chartered Engineer (CEng)
- Incorporated Engineer (IEng)
- Engineering Technician (EngTech)
- Information and Communications Technology Technician (ICTTech)

Assessment for registration is typically carried out on Engineering Council's behalf by a licensed member institution.

The Engineering Technician (EngTech) may obtain the Licentiateship (with post nominals LCGI), a City and Guilds award comparable to a level 4 qualification. The Incorporated Engineer (IEng) may obtain the Graduateship (GCGI) in engineering, comparable to a level 6 qualification. The Chartered Engineer (CEng) may obtain the Membership (MCGI) in engineering, comparable to a level 7 qualification.

== Licensed member institutions ==
- British Computer Society
- British Institute of Non-Destructive Testing
- Chartered Association of Building Engineers
- Chartered Institution of Building Services Engineers
- Chartered Institution of Civil Engineering Surveyors
- Chartered Institution of Highways and Transportation
- Chartered Institute of Information Security
- Chartered Institute of Plumbing and Heating Engineering
- Chartered Institution of Water and Environmental Management
- Energy Institute
- Institution of Agricultural Engineers
- Institution of Civil Engineers
- Institution of Chemical Engineers
- Institution of Engineering Designers
- Institution of Engineering and Technology
- Institute of Explosive Engineers (IExpE)
- Institution of Fire Engineers
- Institution of Gas Engineers and Managers
- Institute of Highway Engineers
- Institute of Healthcare Engineering and Estate Management
- Institution of Lighting Professionals
- Institute of Marine Engineering, Science and Technology
- Institution of Mechanical Engineers
- Institute of Measurement and Control
- The Institution of Royal Engineers
- Institute of Acoustics
- Institute of Materials, Minerals and Mining
- Institute of Physics
- Institute of Physics and Engineering in Medicine
- Institution of Railway Signal Engineers
- Institution of Structural Engineers
- Institute of Water
- INCOSE UK
- Nuclear Institute
- Permanent Way Institution
- Royal Aeronautical Society
- Royal Institution of Naval Architects
- The Safety and Reliability Society
- Society of Operations Engineers
- The Welding Institute

== International registration ==
Engineering Council is a "designated authority" under the implementing regulations for Directive 2005/36/EC. It is a member of the European Federation of National Engineering Associations (FEANI). Engineering Council has relationships with many similar organisations worldwide. It has responsibility for the UK sections of two international registers:

- FEANI's register of European Engineers
- The International Register of Professional Engineers (IRPE/IRoPE)

European Engineer registration entitles the holder to use the European-style prefix title EurIng; International Professional Engineer registration entitles the holder to use the suffix IntPE (UK). The qualifications required for international registration are similar to those required for CEng registration.
