= Leonard Bessemer Pfeil =

Leonard Bessemer Pfeil OBE FRS
- Born: 13 March 1898; London, UK
- Died: 16 February 1969 (aged 70)
- Education: Royal School of Mines
- Known for: metallography
- Awards: OBE (1947)
- Scientific career
- Fields: Metallurgy
- Workplaces: Swansea University College; Mond Nickel Company
- Academic advisors: Prof. Sir Harold Carpenter

Leonard Bessemer Pfeil (13 March 1898 – 16 February 1969) was a British metallurgist.

== Early life ==
Leonard Pfeil was born in London, the son of accountant Leopold Pfeil, and educated at St Dunstan's College, Catford and the Royal School of Mines, where he graduated with a BSc in 1921.

== Career ==
Leonard Pfeil was first appointed a Junior Lecturer in Metallurgy in the newly formed Metallurgy Department of the University College of Swansea, where he worked on the metallographic problems of steel and was awarded a D.Sc by the University of London in 1927.

In 1930 he moved to Birmingham to work at the Mond Nickel Company as Assistant Manager of their Research and Development Department. A variety of projects on the use of nickel alloys were suspended during the Second World War in favour of military ones, particularly the development of heat resisting alloys for use in the newly developed gas turbine engines for aircraft. Manufacturing techniques for the successful Nimonic range of nickel alloys were significantly improved.

When the Whittle jet engine was conceived, the need was for a stronger version of the Nimonic alloy then under development (Nimonic 75). Accordingly, Nimonic 80 was developed and the manufacturing difficulties overcome to the point where an experimental jet plane (E28) with a Whittle engine (Power Jets W.2B) could be flown in 1942, easily outperforming conventional piston-engined fighters. Other projects included the development of diffusion membranes for the separation of uranium isotopes. For his wartime contributions he was awarded the OBE in the 1947 New Year Honours.

After the war Pfeil moved to London as manager of Mond's Research and Development Department to continue his work on Nimonic alloys, becoming a director of Henry Wiggin and Co in 1946 and a director of Mond Nickel in 1951. He served on many official and institutional advisory committees and as President of the Institution of Metallurgists for 1953/54 and of the Institute of Metals for 1957. In 1960 he became Vice-Chairman of International Nickel Limited, the United Kingdom branch of the parent firm, holding the post until his retirement in 1963. He was elected a Fellow of the Royal Society in 1951.

Leonard Pfeil died in 1969. He had married Olive Williams in 1929 and had two sons.
