= SQEP =

Acronym for suitably qualified and experienced person

SQEP is an acronym for suitably qualified and experienced person. The term is notably used in the Defense, Aerospace, and Intelligence sectors. SQEP is also in wider usage in engineering, defence, human factors, training and safety-related contexts. In spoken usage, a person can describe themselves as SQEP'd, as in "I'm not SQEP'd for that."

== UK nuclear ==
In the UK nuclear context, it is a standard requirement for licensed sites that "The licensee shall make and implement adequate arrangements to ensure that only suitably qualified and experienced persons perform any duties which may affect the safety of operations on the site or any other duties assigned by or under these conditions or any arrangements required under these conditions.".

In this context the term is not restricted to professionally qualified personnel or to duties requiring significant technical expertise: any means any

It is essential that all personnel whose activities have the potential to impact on nuclear safety are suitably qualified and experienced (SQEP) to carry out their jobs. This includes both those who directly carry out operations and others such as directors, managers, designers, safety case authors etc whose roles, if inadequately conceived or executed, may affect safety in less visible ways – for example, through introducing latent technical or organisational weaknesses.

— Office of Nuclear Regulation

and conversely suitably means suitably, not particularly well: the Office of Nuclear Regulation takes SQEPness to be broadly equivalent to the International Atomic Energy Agency concept of 'competence'

IAEA has defined competence as "the ability to put skills and knowledge into practice in order to perform a job in an effective and efficient manner to an established standard" ONR concurs with this definition, which is widely accepted within the international nuclear community. Other factors contributing to a person's competence include the person's prior experience, aptitudes, attitudes, behaviours, skills and qualifications.

— Office of Nuclear Regulation

=== Duly Authorised Person (DAP) ===
In the context of UK nuclear licensing, the term "duly authorised person" (DAP) was extensively used for trained and experience operational staff, on plant or in control rooms. This may have come from UK power-station practice originating with the CEGB and nuclear operations. SQEP was introduced for those staff who may not have direct responsibility on plant, but whose actions or input could be safety related.
