= Chartered Institute of Information Security =

UK professional body

The Chartered Institute of Information Security
- Formation: 2006
- Type: Not-for-Profit
- Legal status: Limited Company registered in England and Wales
- Purpose: Professional Body
- Headquarters: Evesham, Worcestershire United Kingdom
- Region served: United Kingdom, Worldwide
- Members: 10,000
- Chairman: Luke Beason
- Website: CIISec website

The Chartered Institute of Information Security (CIISec), formerly the Institute of Information Security Professionals (IISP), is an independent, not-for-profit body governed by its members, with the principal objective of advancing the professionalism of information security practitioners and thereby the professionalism of the industry as a whole. The primary aim of the institute is to provide a universally accepted focal point for the information security profession.

== Overview ==
The Chartered Institute of Information Security has a membership representing over 10,000 individuals globally throughout Industry, Academia and Government.

CIISec has offices in Evesham, Worcestershire and Southwark, London. The institute's HQs are based in Evesham, close to the cyber-hubs of Cheltenham and Malvern.

The institute is run by its members and has an elected board of directors with Luke Beason as the chairman.

== Activities ==
One of its main activities is to act as an accreditation authority for the industry. The consortium of CIISec, CREST, and RHUL has been appointed by NCSC as one of the certification bodies for the UK's Certified Cyber Professional (CCP) assured service. The consortium assesses individuals based on the Skills Framework, as part of a certification scheme driven by NCSC, the IA arm of GCHQ.

Full membership of the institute is information security's professional standard and endorses the knowledge, experience and professionalism of an individual in this field. The award of membership levels is competency-based which sets it apart from purely knowledge-based qualifications and is awarded to those professionals who demonstrate breadth and depth of knowledge, and substantial practical experience.

== History ==
Based in London, United Kingdom, the institute was established in 2006 by information security professionals. In 2007, the institute developed the CIISec Skills Framework. This framework describes the range of competencies expected of information security and information assurance (IA) professionals in the effective performance of their roles. It was developed through collaboration between both private and public sector organisations and academics and security leaders.

In 2012, as part of the government's investment in cyber security, the CIISec consortium was appointed by NCSC (formally CESG) to provide certification for UK government information assurance professionals. The CIISec defined a set of information security skills and skill levels and these skill definitions have been supplemented by NCSC to enable certification bodies to make formal assessments, and others to make informal assessments against the IA skill levels.

== See also ==
- British cyber security community

== Sources ==
- "Cloud Expo 2014 presentation from Piers Wilson, Director of the IISP: Equipping security teams to deal with changing technology.", Wednesday 26 February 2014.
- Burke, Claire. " Top tips to stop cyber criminals from targeting your small business ", The Guardian, London, Tuesday 11 March 2014.
- "New Cyber Security Government skills certification from IISP and CREST.", Wednesday 24 October 2012.
- "CREST works with industry influencers to enhance the recognition and professionalism of the technical security industry.", Retrieved on Saturday 15 March 2014.
- "The Times Raconteur Section: What is a security professional? Knowing what good look like.", Wednesday 12 December 2012.
- "e-skills uk and IISP to align professional skills standards in information-security.", Tuesday 6 November 2012.
- "IISP Pulse magazine focus on Validsoft ceo's views."
