= Engineers Europe =

- Founded: 1951
- Type: Professional Organization
- Purpose: Engineering
- Location: Bruxelles, Belgium
- Region served: Europe
- Website: www.engineerseurope.com

Engineers Europe (stylized as ENGINEERS EUROPE), formally FEANI (Fédération Européenne d'Associations Nationales d'Ingénieurs / European Federation of National Engineering Associations) prior to 01 January 2023, is a federation of national professional bodies representing engineering in European countries. Founded in 1951, it aims to promote the recognition, mobility and interests of Europe's engineering profession. Engineers Europe maintains a database of recognised engineering qualifications and also maintains a (non-comprehensive) register of professionally qualified engineers from member countries.

== The Engineers Europe register and European Engineer status ==
Engineers Europe maintains a register of professionally qualified engineers from member countries. Individuals may have their names added to the register through the national member institution of their own country. To register, candidates need to have undergone at least seven years of "formation" including at least three years of engineering education and at least two years of professional engineering experience. (The balance of three years can be made up of any combination of engineering education, training and professional engineering experience.)

Engineers Europe grants engineers whose names are on the Engineers Europe register the title European Engineer and the corresponding "Eur Ing", "EUR ING" prefix. However, European Engineer and the Eur Ing designation are not legally recognised in all countries. The European Commission has acclaimed the register as a good example of a profession's self-regulation, and indicated that member states will find the Engineers Europe register helpful when deciding whether foreign engineers are qualified to practice; the Commission concluded that engineers on the register "should not normally be required to undertake an adaptation period or sit an aptitude test" in order to practice in European countries.

== List of national members ==
Austria	Österreichisches Nationalkomitee der FEANI
Belgium	Comité National Belge de la FEANI (CNB/BNC)
Bulgaria	Federation of Scientific Technical Unions in Bulgaria (FNTS)
Croatia	Croatian Engineering Association (HIS)
Cyprus	FEANI Cyprus National Committee
Czech Republic	Czech Association of Scientific and Technical Societies (CSVTS)
Denmark	Ingeniørforeningen i Danmark (IDA)
Estonia	Estonian Association of Engineers
Finland	The Finnish National Committee for FEANI
France	Ingénieurs et Scientifiques de France (IESF)
Germany	Deutscher Verband Technisch-Wissenschaftlicher Vereine (DVT)
Greece	Technical Chamber of Greece (TEE)
Hungary	Hungarian National Committee for FEANI
Iceland	Association of Chartered Engineers of Iceland
Ireland	Engineers Ireland (EI)
Italy	Consiglio Nazionale Ingegneri (CNI)
Kazakhstan	Kazakhstan Society of Engineering Education (KazSEE)
Luxembourg	Comité National de la FEANI
Malta	Chamber of Engineers
Netherlands	Netherlands National FEANI Committee
North Macedonia	Engineering Institution of Macedonia
Norway	Norwegian Society of Engineers and Technologists(NITO)
Poland	Polish Federation of Engineering Associations
Portugal	Ordem dos Engenheiros
Romania	The General Association of Engineers in Romania (AGIR)
Russia	Russian Union of Scientific and Engineering Associations (RUSEA)
Serbia	The Union of Engineers and Technicians of Serbia (UETS)
Slovakia	Slovak National Committee for FEANI (SNKF)
Slovenia	Slovenian National Committee for FEANI
Spain	Comité Nacional Español de la FEANI
Sweden	Swedish National Committee for FEANI
Switzerland	Schweizer Nationalkomitee für FEANI
Turkey	Union of Chambers of Turkish Engineers and Architects
Ukraine	Union of Scientific and Engineering Association of Ukraine
United Kingdom	Engineering Council
