= List of post-nominal letters (United Kingdom) =

Post-nominal letters are used in the United Kingdom after a person's name in order to indicate their positions, qualifications, memberships, or other status. There are various established orders for giving these, e.g. from the Ministry of Justice, Debrett's, and A & C Black's Titles and Forms of Address, which are generally in close agreement.

== Baronet or Esquire ==
Rank	Post-nominal
Baronet	Bt or Bart
Esquire	Esq (Note: Esquire (or Esq as a suffix) is now commonly used in the UK in place of the prefix Mr in formal address; according to the Dictionary of Genealogy it has no real meaning, while according to Buckingham Palace it is an entitlement of all British-born men.)

== Orders and decorations ==
Office	Post-nominal
Recipient of the Victoria Cross	VC
Recipient of the George Cross	GC
Knight Companion of the Order of the Garter	KG
Lady Companion of the Order of the Garter	LG
Knight of the Order of the Thistle	KT
Lady of the Order of the Thistle	LT
Knight of the Order of Saint Patrick	KP (Note: The Order of Saint Patrick is now dormant.)
Knight/Dame Grand Cross of the Order of the Bath	GCB
Member of the Order of Merit	OM
Knight Grand Commander of the Order of the Star of India	GCSI (Note: The Order of the Star of India is now dormant.)
Knight/Dame Grand Cross of the Order of St Michael and St George	GCMG
Knight Grand Commander of the Order of the Indian Empire	GCIE (Note: The Order of the Indian Empire is now dormant.)
Member of the Order of Victoria and Albert	VA (Note: The Order of Victoria and Albert is now defunct; no appointments have been made since the death of Queen Victoria.)
Member of the Imperial Order of the Crown of India	CI (Note: The Order of the Crown of India is now dormant.)
Knight/Dame Grand Cross of the Royal Victorian Order	GCVO
Knight/Dame Grand Cross of the Order of the British Empire	GBE
Member of the Order of the Companions of Honour	CH
Knight Commander of the Order of the Bath	KCB
Dame Commander of the Order of the Bath	DCB
Knight Commander of the Order of the Star of India	KCSI
Knight Commander of the Order of St Michael and St George	KCMG
Dame Commander of the Order of St Michael and St George	DCMG
Knight Commander of the Order of the Indian Empire	KCIE
Knight Commander of the Royal Victorian Order	KCVO
Dame Commander of the Royal Victorian Order	DCVO
Knight Commander of the Order of the British Empire	KBE
Dame Commander of the Order of the British Empire	DBE
Companion of the Order of the Bath	CB
Companion of the Order of the Star of India	CSI
Companion of the Order of St Michael and St George	CMG
Companion of the Order of the Indian Empire	CIE
Commander of the Royal Victorian Order	CVO
Commander of the Order of the British Empire	CBE
Companion of the Distinguished Service Order	DSO
Lieutenant of the Royal Victorian Order	LVO
Officer of the Order of the British Empire	OBE
Companion of the Imperial Service Order	ISO
Recipient of the Imperial Service Medal	ISM
Member of the Royal Victorian Order	MVO
Member of the Order of the British Empire	MBE
Member of the Indian Order of Merit (Military)	IOM (Note: The Indian Order of Merit is now dormant.)
Recipient of the Conspicuous Gallantry Cross	CGC
Member of the Royal Red Cross	RRC
Recipient of the Distinguished Service Cross	DSC
Recipient of the Military Cross	MC
Recipient of the Distinguished Flying Cross	DFC
Recipient of the Air Force Cross	AFC
Associate of the Royal Red Cross	ARRC
Member of the Order of British India	OBI (Note: The Order of British India is now dormant.)
Recipient of the Distinguished Conduct Medal	DCM
Recipient of the Conspicuous Gallantry Medal	CGM
Recipient of the George Medal	GM
Recipient of the Indian Distinguished Service Medal	IDSM (Note: The Indian Distinguished Service Medal is no longer awarded.)
Recipient of the Distinguished Service Medal	DSM
Recipient of the Military Medal	MM
Recipient of the Distinguished Flying Medal	DFM
Recipient of the Air Force Medal	AFM
Recipient of the Medal for Saving Life at Sea	SGM
Member of the Indian Order of Merit (Civil)	IOM
Recipient of the Colonial Police Medal for Gallantry	CPM
Recipient of the King's Gallantry Medal	KGM
Recipient of the Royal Victorian Medal	RVM
Recipient of the British Empire Medal	BEM
Recipient of the King's Police and Fire Service Medal	KPFSM
Recipient of the King's Police Medal	KPM
Recipient of the King's Fire Service Medal	KFSM
Recipient of the King's Ambulance Service Medal	KAM
Recipient of the King's Volunteer Reserves Medal	KVRM
Recipient of the Colonial Police Medal for Meritorious Service	OTPM (Note: Previously known as the Colonial Police Medal (CPM).)
Recipient of the Army Emergency Reserve Decoration	ERD
Recipient of the Volunteer Officers' Decoration	VD
Recipient of the Territorial Decoration	TD
Recipient of the Ulster Defence Regiment Medal	UD
Recipient of the Efficiency Decoration	ED
Recipient of the Decoration for Officers of the Royal Naval Reserve	RD
Recipient of the Decoration for Officers of the Royal Naval Volunteer Reserve	VRD
Recipient of the Air Efficiency Award	AE
Recipient of the Merchant Navy Medal for Meritorious Service	MNM (Note: Postnominals date from Sep 16 onwards, when it became a state award. Previous awards of the Merchant Navy Medal, awarded from 2005 to 2015, did not attract post-nominal letters. See http://www.merchantnavymedal.org/)
Recipient of the Volunteer Reserves Service Medal, or volunteer reservist with 10 years' service	VR

When listing the honours and awards enjoyed by any person it is not customary to include the Order of St John, as this is a Royal Order of Chivalry and not a State Order, and so confers no precedence. The statutes of the order state (statute 32(2)) The letters specified ... may be used ... but admission or promotion to any Grade of the Order ... shall not confer any rank, style, title, dignity, appellation or social precedence whatsoever.

The Grades of the Order of St John are:

Grade I	Bailiff or Dame Grand Cross	GCStJ
Grade II	Knight or Dame of Justice or Grace	KStJ or DStJ
Grade III (a)	Chaplain	ChStJ
Grade III (b)	Commander (Brother or Sister)	CStJ
Grade IV	Officer (Brother or Sister)	OStJ
Grade V	Member (since 2008); Serving Brother or Serving Sister (before 2008)	MStJ; SBStJ or SSStJ
Grade VI	Esquire (no longer in use as of 2018)	EsqStJ

== Appointments ==
Appointments to The King
Privy Counsellor (Note: The letters "PC" are normally only used to identify members of the Privy Council of the United Kingdom who are peers. The distinction is needed because peers already hold a prefix ("Rt Hon" or higher) even when they are not Privy Counsellors, while the same cannot be said of non-peers. However if the prefix "The Right Honourable" is omitted before a non-peer's name then the post-nominal letters "PC" may be used to identify a person's membership of the Privy Council.)	PC There was also the Privy Council of Northern Ireland (P.C. (N.I.), which ceased to have appointments made in 1972, but there are only 2 members now living – Lord Kilclooney (appointed in 1970) and Robin Baillie. They also use The Right Honourable.
Aide de Camp to His Majesty The King	ADC
Honorary Physician to The King	KHP
Honorary Surgeon to The King	KHS
Honorary Dental Surgeon to The King	KHDS
Honorary Nursing Sister to The King	KHNS
Honorary Chaplain to The King	KHC
Legal positions, etc. (Note: Identified by post-nominal abbreviation only when citing legal reports, in every other circumstance identified by pre-nominal title)
Supreme Court Justice	SCJ
Justice of the High Court	J
Lord Justice of Appeal	LJ
President of the Supreme Court	P
Deputy President of the Supreme Court	DP
Lord Chancellor	LC
Lord Chief Justice	CJ
Master of the Rolls	MR
Chancellor of the High Court	C
Appointments
King's Serjeant	KS (defunct)
Serjeant-at-law	SL (defunct)
King's Counsel	KC (changes to 'QC' when a queen regnant succeeds to the throne, as was the case from 6 February 1952 to the death of Queen Elizabeth II on 8 September 2022)
Justice of the Peace	JP
Deputy Lieutenant	DL
Legislators (Note: Placed here on the Ministry of Justice list but after memberships of learned societies, royal academies and professional bodies by both Debrett's and Black's)
Member of Parliament (Note: "Member of Parliament" is used in the UK and other Commonwealth countries to describe members of the lower house of Parliament only. In the UK, members of the House of Commons are described as Members of Parliament, like in Canada, but members of the House of Lords are not.)	MP
Member of the Scottish Parliament	MSP
Member of the Senedd (Welsh Parliament)	MS – formerly 'AM' (Assembly Member)
Member of the Northern Ireland Assembly ('Member of the Legislative Assembly')	MLA
Member of the House of Keys (Isle of Man)	MHK
Speaker of the House of Keys (Isle of Man)	SHK
Member of the Legislative Council (Isle of Man)	MLC
Member of the London Assembly	AM (Note: When the London Assembly was first established in 2000 there was some debate over its members' post-nominal letters. The most commonly used were "AM", "GLA", "MLA" and "GLAM". GLA is a short form of Greater London Authority, of which the London Assembly is part. A consensus eventually grew around the use of AM.)

== University degrees and academic qualifications ==
These are usually given in ascending order, and may be followed by an abbreviation denoting the awarding Institute. "Hons" or "(Hons)" may be added after bachelor's or integrated master's degrees awarded with honours.

University degrees (Note: The exact post-nominals for degrees vary between courses and between universities, common ones are shown here, ordered according to the Framework for Higher Education Qualifications.)
Foundation degree	e.g. FdA, FdSc
Bachelor's degree	e.g. BA, BSc
Primary qualifications in medicine, dentistry and veterinary science (master's level)	e.g. MB ChB, MB BS, BM BS, BDS, BVSc, BVMS
Integrated master's degree	e.g. MEng, MChem, MPhys, MPharm
Master's degree	e.g. MPhil, MLitt, MRes, MA, MSc
Doctorate	e.g. PhD/DPhil, EdD, DBA, DClinPsy
University abbreviations Optionally given after the degree(s) to which they refer in formal lists. (Only abbreviated forms shown; other institutions use full names [omitting "University of"] in postnominals. Institutions are sometimes given in parentheses.) This refers to the institution granting the degree, not the place of study, e.g. London or Wales for degrees awarded by those federal universities, with the college name (e.g. UCL) only being used for degrees granted using the college's own degree awarding powers.
University of Aberdeen	Aberd or Aberdon
Abertay University, Dundee	Aber Dund
Anglia Ruskin University	Ang Rus
Aston University	Aston
University of the Arts London	Arts Lond
University of Bedfordshire	Bedf
Queen's University Belfast	Belf or QUB
University of Birmingham	Birm, B'ham or Bham
Birmingham City University	Birm City or BCU
University of Bournemouth	Bourne
University of Bradford	Brad
University of Brighton	Brigh
University of Bristol	Bris
Brunel University	Brun
University of Buckingham	Buck
University of Cambridge	Cantab or Camb
Canterbury Christ Church University	Cant Univ
Archbishop of Canterbury	Cantuar or Lambeth
Cardiff University	Card
University of Central Lancashire	Cen Lancs or UCLan
University of Chester	Chest
University of Chichester	Cicest or Chich
Cass Business School	Cass or Cass Lond
City, University of London	City Lond
University of Coventry	Cov
Cranfield University	Cran
University for the Creative Arts	UCA
University of Cumbria	Cumb
De Montfort University	De Mont
University of Dundee	Dund
Durham University	Dunelm or Durh
University of East Anglia	East Ang or UEA
University of East London	East Lond or UEL
University of Edinburgh	Edin
University of Exeter	Exon or Exe
University of Glamorgan (now part of the University of South Wales)	Glam
University of Glasgow	Glas
Glasgow Caledonian University	Glas Cal
University of Gloucestershire	Glouc
University of Greenwich	Greenw
Guildhall School of Music and Drama	GSMD
Heriot-Watt University	H-W
University of Hertfordshire	Herts
University of Huddersfield	Hudd
Imperial College London	Imp or Imp Lond
Institute of Education, London (now part of UCL)	IOE Lond
University of Kent	Cantuar (Note: "Profile: Prof Lance Pettitt BA (Cantaur)[sic] MA PhD (NUI Dublin)". St Mary's University, Twickenham. – according to his CV, Prof. Pettitt earned his BA at Kent) or Kent. (Note: Use of Cantuar for Kent is rare and risks confusion with both Lambeth degrees and the University of Canterbury, NZ. The Latin name for Kent is Cantium (hence Cantiensis) which would give Cant (also used by the University of Canterbury, NZ); the University of Kent was originally the University of Kent at Canterbury.)
King's College London	KCL
Kingston University	KUL
University of Lancaster	Lanc
University of Leeds	Leeds
Leeds Beckett University (formerly Leeds Metropolitan University	LBU (Leeds Met)
University of Leicester	Leic
University of Lincoln	Linc
University of Liverpool	Liv, Lpool or L'pool
Liverpool Hope University	Liv Hope
Liverpool John Moores University	Liv J Moores
University of London	Lond or Londin
London Business School	LBS
London Metropolitan University	Lond Met
London School of Economics and Political Science	LSE
London School of Hygiene and Tropical Medicine	LSHTM
London South Bank University	Lond SB
Loughborough University	Lough or Lboro
University of Manchester	Manc
Manchester Metropolitan University	Manc Met
University of Middlesex	Middx
Newcastle University	Newc or Ncle
University of North London	North Lond
University of Northampton	N'ton
University of Northumbria	N'ria
University of Nottingham	Nott
Nottingham Trent University	Nott Trent
The Open University	Open
University of Oxford	Oxon or Oxf
Oxford Brookes University	Oxf Brookes
University of Plymouth	Plym
University of Portsmouth	Port
Queen Margaret University	Qu Marg or QMU
Queen Mary, University of London	QMUL
University of Reading	R'dg or Rdg
Robert Gordon University	Robt Gor
University of Roehampton	Roeh
Royal Academy of Music	RAM
Royal College of Art	RCA
Royal College of Music	RCM
Royal Holloway, University of London	RHUL
Royal Veterinary College	RVM
University of St Andrews	St And
Salford University	Salf
School of Oriental and African Studies	SOAS
University of Sheffield	Sheff
Sheffield Hallam University	Sheff Hallam
University of Southampton	Soton or S'ton
St George's, University of London	St George's Lond
Southampton Solent University	S'ton Sol
University of Staffordshire	Staffs
University of Stirling	Stir or Sruighlea
University of Strathclyde	Strath
University of Sunderland	Sund
University of Surrey	Sur
University of Sussex	Sus
University of Teesside	Tees
Thames Valley University (now the University of West London)	Thames V
University College London	UCL
Ulster University	Ulster
University of Wales	Wales or Cymru
University of Warwick	Warw
University of the West of England	West Eng or UWE
University of the West of Scotland	West Scot
University of Westminster	Westmin
University of Winchester	Winton or Winc
University of Wolverhampton	Wolv
University of Worcester	Worc
University of York	Ebor or York
University diplomas, certificates, etc. These are not given as postnominals according to Debrett's, however the Oxford University Calendar style guide lists them after degrees.
Postgraduate diploma	PgDip, PgD, PGDCCI, etc.
Postgraduate certificate	PgCert, PgC, PgCLTHE, etc.
Graduate diploma	GradDip, GradD, GDip, etc.
Graduate certificate	GradCert, GradC, GCert, etc.
Higher National Certificate	HNC/HNCert
Higher National Diploma	HND/HNDip
Diploma of Higher Education	DipHE
BTEC Extended Diploma (Ordinary National Diploma)	Dip, OND
Certificate of Higher Education	CertHE
Diploma of Imperial College	DIC
University fellowships and associateships, etc.
Fellow of King's College London	FKC
Associate of King's College	AKC
Associate/Master of the Camborne School of Mines, University of Exeter	ACSM/MCSM
Associate of the University of Hertfordshire	AUH
Associate of the Imperial College School of Medicine, London	AICSM
Associate of the Royal School of Mines, Imperial College London	ARSM
Associate of the Royal College of Science, Imperial College London	ARCS
Associate in Theology	ATh
Licentiate in Theology	LTh
City & Guilds of London Institute
Licentiate of the City & Guilds of London Institute	LCGI
Affiliate of the City & Guilds of London Institute	AfCGI
Graduate of the City & Guilds of London Institute	GCGI
Associate of the City & Guilds of London Institute (Note: Awarded to undergraduates who receive a BEng or MEng degree from a programme within the City and Guilds College-Imperial College London.)	ACGI
City and Guilds Insignia Award in Technology	CGIA
Member of the City & Guilds of London Institute	MCGI
Fellow of the City & Guilds of London Institute	FCGI
Honoris Causa Fellow of the City & Guilds of London Institute	HonFCGI

== Religious institutes and medical qualifications ==
=== Religious institutes ===
Some examples are given here. See the list of Catholic religious institutes for a fuller listing of current Catholic orders (note that this article gives American-style post-nominals with stops; when used in the UK the stops should be omitted).

Christian Brothers	CFC
Oratory of Saint Philip Neri	Cong. Orat.
Canons Regular	CR + Initials of specific Congregation e.g. CRIC
Marist Brothers	FMS
De La Salle Brothers	FSC
Missionary Society of Saint Paul	MSP
Order of Friars Minor	OFM
Order of Friars Minor Capuchin	OFM Cap.
Conventual Franciscans	OFM Conv.
Benedictines	OSB
Order of Preachers ("Dominicans" or "Blackfriars")	OP, OPL (Tertiaries)
Society of the Sacred Heart	RSCJ
Salesians	SDB
Society of Jesus (Jesuits)	SJ
Society of the Sacred Mission	SSM, CSM
Discalced Carmelites	OCD
Anglican Franciscans	SSF or CSF (1st Order), OSC (2nd Order), TSSF (3rd Order), CompSSF (Companions); CFC – Community of Francis and Clare

=== Medical qualifications ===
According to Debrett's, these are placed directly after orders, decorations and medals (i.e. replacing university degrees). Unlike other degrees, medical qualifications are listed in descending order, doctorates first.

Diploma of Child Health	DCH (RCPCH)
Diploma of Legal Medicine	DLM
Doctor of Medicine	DM; MD
Doctor of Surgery	DCh; DS
Doctor of Dental Surgery	DDS
Master of Surgery	MCh; MChir; MS; ChM
Master of Dental Surgery	MDS; MChD
Master of the Art of Obstetrics	MAO
Master of Orthopaedic Surgery	MChOrth
Master of Clinical Psychology	MClinPsychol
Master of Clinical Science	MClSc
Master of Community Health	MCommH
Master of Medicine	MMed
Master of Medical Science	MMedSci; MMS
Master of Public Health	MPH
Bachelor of Medicine	BM; MB
Bachelor of Dental Surgery	BDS; BChD; BDentS
Bachelor of the Art of Obstetrics	BAO
Bachelor of Acupuncture	BAc
Bachelor of Applied Science	BASc
Bachelor of Medical Science	BMedSci
Bachelor of Pharmacy	BPharm
Bachelor of Medicine, Bachelor of Surgery	MB BChir; MB ChB; MB BCh; MB BS; BM BCh; BM BS; BM
Fellow of the Academy of Medical Educators	FAcadMEd
Fellow of the Academy of Operational Medicine	FAOM
Fellow of the Academy of Wilderness Medicine	FAWM
Masters Fellow of the Academy of Wilderness Medicine	MFAWM
Fellow of the Royal College of Paramedics	FCPara
Fellow of the Faculty of Clinical Informatics	FFCI
Fellow of the Faculty of Public Health	FFPH
Fellow of the Faculty of Intensive Care Medicine	FFICM
Member of the Faculty of Remote, Rural and Humanitarian Healthcare (RCSEd)	MFRRHHEd
Fellow of the Faculty of Remote, Rural and Humanitarian Healthcare (RCSEd)	FRRHHEd
Fellow of the Royal College of Anaesthetists	FRCA
Fellow of the Royal College of Emergency Medicine	FRCEM
Fellow of the Royal College of Nursing	FRCN
Fellow of the Royal College of Ophthalmologists	FRCOphth
Fellow of the Royal College of Physicians	FRCP
Fellow of the Royal College of Paediatrics and Child Health	FRCPCH
Fellow of the Royal College of Podiatrists	FRCPodS (Podiatric Surgeon)
(Medical) Fellow of the Royal College of Physicians and Surgeons of Glasgow	FRCP(Glas)
Fellow of the Royal College of Surgeons of England	FRCS
Fellow of the Royal College of Surgeons of Edinburgh	FRCSEd
Fellow of the Royal College of Surgeons of Ireland	FRCSI
(Surgical) Fellow of the Royal College of Physicians and Surgeons of Glasgow	FRCS(Glasg)
Fellow of the Royal College of Obstetricians and Gynaecologists	FRCOG
Fellow of the Royal College of General Practitioners	FRCGP
International Fellow of the Royal College of General Practitioners	FRCGP[INT]
Fellow of the Royal College of Occupational Therapists	FRCOT
Fellow of the Royal College of Physicians of Ireland	FRCPI
Fellow of the Royal College of Pathologists	FRCPath
Fellow of the Royal College of Psychiatrists	FRCPsych
Fellow of the Royal College of Radiologists	FRCR
Fellow in Dental Surgery Royal College of Surgeons	FDS RCS
Fellow in Dental Surgery, Royal College of Surgeons of Edinburgh	FDS RCSEd
Fellow in Dental Surgery, Royal College of Physicians and Surgeons of Glasgow	FDS RCPS(Glas)
Fellow of the Faculty of Intensive Care Medicine	FFICM
Member of the Academy of Medical Educators	MAcadMEd
Member of the Royal College of Emergency Medicine	MRCEM
Member of the Faculty of Dental Surgery, Royal College of Surgeons of England	MFDS RCS
Member of the Faculty of Dental Surgery, Royal College of Physicians and Surgeons of Glasgow	MFDS RCPS(Glasg)
Member of the Faculty of Intensive Care Medicine	MFICM
Member of the Faculty of Public Health	MFPH
Member of the Faculty of Pharmaceutical Medicine	MFPM
Member of the Faculty of Sexual and Reproductive Healthcare	MFSRH
Member of the Joint Dental Faculties, Royal College of Surgeons of England	MJDF(RCS Eng)
Member of the Royal College of Anaesthetists	MRCA
Member of the Royal College of Paramedics	MCPara
Member of the Royal College of Nursing	MRCN
Member of the Royal College of Ophthalmologists	MRCOphth
Member of the Royal College of Physicians	MRCP
Member of the Royal College of Paediatrics and Child Health	MRCPCH
Member of the Royal College of Physicians of Edinburgh	MRCPEd
(Medical) Member of the Royal College of Physicians and Surgeons of Glasgow	MRCP(Glasg)
(Intercollegiate) Member of the Royal Colleges of Physicians of the United Kingdom	MRCP(UK)
Member of the Royal College of Obstetricians and Gynaecologists	MRCOG
(Surgical) Member of the Royal College of Physicians and Surgeons of Glasgow	MRCS(Glasg)
Member of the Royal College of Surgeons of Ireland	MRCSI
Member of the Royal College of General Practitioners	MRCGP
International Member of the Royal College of General Practitioners	MRCGP[INT]
Having passed the MRCGP examinations, (sans current RCGP membership)	MRCGP (year achieved)
Member of the Royal College of Occupational Therapists	MRCOT
Member of the Royal College of Pathologists	MRCPath
Member of the Royal College of Physicians of Ireland	MRCPI
Member of the Royal College of Psychiatrists	MRCPsych
Member of the Royal College of Radiologists	MRCR
Member of the Royal College of Speech and Language Therapists	MRCSLT
Member of the Royal College of Surgeons of England	MRCS
Member of the Royal College of Surgeons of Edinburgh	MRCSEd
Member of the Faculty of Clinical Informatics	MFCI

== Fellowship or membership of learned societies, academies or professional institutions ==
These are generally placed in the order learned societies first, then Royal academicians, then professional institutions. There are two schools of thought as to how these should be ordered within each category: A & C Black's Titles and Forms of Address states that "As a general rule, letters should be shown in the order of the foundation of the societies, etc." Contrary to this, Debrett's consider that within learned societies: "There is no recognised order for placing these letters. In practice, where one society is indisputably of greater importance than another the letters are usually placed in that order." (Note: Debrett's previously added that: "Strictly speaking, [Learned Societies] should be arranged according to date of foundation or incorporation of the societies concerned, but some hold that those with a Royal Charter should take precedence." This has been deleted from the current advice.) Similarly, for professional institutions: "[T]here is no recognised order for placing qualifications awarded by different bodies, a recipient usually places these letters on headed paper, business cards, etc, in order of importance to his particular profession." There is no clear distinction between a learned society and a professional institute. With regard to Royal Academicians, Debrett's says: "Although Royal Academicians come second in this list, it is not suggested that they yield in precedence to fellows of learned societies. In practice, the two lists do not coincide."

Black's notes that where a professional body or society has multiple grades of membership, only the highest is used except in professional correspondence, and that fellowships "election to which is a distinction" (e.g. FRS, RSA, RA, FBA) should be used on all correspondence, whereas initials only indicating support for a society are limited to correspondence on matters of interest to that society. Initials can also be used in professional contexts to indicate expertise. Debrett's also distinguishes between initials issued as an honour, and those available as a subscription, with only the former normally being used in social correspondence. The former include fellowships of "principal learned societies", including, in order of foundation, FRS, FSA, FRSE, FRSL and FBA.

In this table, all societies, institutions, etc. are listed alphabetically by substantive name, (Note: I.e. by what they are a society or institute of or for, e.g. Aeronautical for the Royal Aeronautical Society. Bodies without a substantive name, such as the Royal Society, are listed at the top, ordered by their full names.) rather than attempting to establish an order of precedence.

Some post-nominals (and associated professional titles) are protected as "Professions Regulated by Professional Bodies Incorporated by Royal Charter" under the European professional qualification directives. These are indicated with an asterisk (e.g. CEng*).

Memberships and fellowships of the various medical Royal Colleges are listed post-nominally as medical qualifications (see the previous section) rather than with professional bodies and learned societies.

British Academy
Fellow of the British Academy	FBA
Honorary Fellow of the British Academy	HonFBA
Learned Society of Wales
Fellow of the Learned Society of Wales	FLSW
Royal Academicians
President of the Royal Academy	PRA
Past President of the Royal Academy	PPRA
Royal Academician	RA
Associate of the Royal Academy	ARA
Honorary Royal Academician	HonRA
Royal Academy of Engineering
Fellow of the Royal Academy of Engineering	FREng
Royal Institution of Great Britain
Fellow of the Royal Institution of Great Britain (This membership grade was abolished in 2015.)	FRi
Member of the Royal Institution of Great Britain	MRi
Associate Member of the Royal Institution of Great Britain	AMRi
Royal Irish Academy (Note: While based outside the UK, the RIA is an all-Ireland learned body covering Northern Ireland)
Member of the Royal Irish Academy	MRIA
Royal Scottish Academicians
President of the Royal Scottish Academy	PRSA
Past President of the Royal Scottish Academy	PPRSA
Royal Scottish Academician	RSA
Associate of the Royal Scottish Academy	ARSA
Honorary Royal Scottish Academician	HRSA
The Royal Society
Fellow of the Royal Society	FRS
Honorary Fellow of the Royal Society	HonFRS
President of the Royal Society	PRS (Note: Used only within the society)
Foreign Member of the Royal Society	ForMemRS
Royal Society of Edinburgh
Fellow of the Royal Society of Edinburgh	FRSE
A
Association of Accounting Technicians
Fellow Member of the Association of Accounting Technicians	FMAAT
Member of the Association of Accounting Technicians	MAAT
AAT Bookkeeper	AATQB
Institute of Acoustics (United Kingdom)
Honorary Fellow of the Institute of Acoustics	HonFIOA
Fellow of the Institute of Acoustics	FIOA
Member of the Institute of Acoustics	MIOA
Associate Member of the Institute of Acoustics	AMIOA
Technician Member of the Institute of Acoustics	TechIOA
Institute and Faculty of Actuaries
Honorary Fellow of the Institute and Faculty of Actuaries	HonFIA or HonFFA
Fellow of the Institute and Faculty of Actuaries	FIA* or FFA* (Note: Fellows who were fellows of both the Institute of Actuaries and the Faculty of Actuaries prior to their merger may continue to use both FIA and FFA)
Associate of the Institute and Faculty of Actuaries	AIA* or AFA*
Institute of Administrative Management
Fellow of the Institute of Administrative Management	FInstAM
Member of the Institute of Administrative Management	MInstAM
Associate of the Institute of Administrative Management	AInstAM
The Royal Aeronautical Society
Fellow of the Royal Aeronautical Society	FRAeS*
Companion of the Royal Aeronautical Society	CRAeS
Member of the Royal Aeronautical Society	MRAeS*
Associate Member of the Royal Aeronautical Society	AMRAeS
Associate of the Royal Aeronautical Society	ARAeS
Institution of Agricultural Engineers
Honorary Fellow of the Institution of Agricultural Engineers	HonFIAgrE
Fellow of the Institution of Agricultural Engineers	FIAgrE
Member of the Institution of Agricultural Engineers	MIAgrE
Associate Member of the Institution of Agricultural Engineers	AMIAgrE
Technician of the Institution of Agricultural Engineers	TIAgrE
Affiliate of the Institution of Agricultural Engineers	AIAgrE
Agricultural Law Association
Fellow of the Agricultural Law Association (United Kingdom)	FALA
Central Association of Agricultural Valuers
Fellow of the Central Association of Agricultural Valuers	FAAV
Institution of Analysts and Programmers
Fellow of the Institution of Analysts and Programmers	FIAP
Member of the Institution of Analysts and Programmers	MIAP
Associate Member of the Institution of Analysts and Programmers	AMIAP
Graduate of the Institution of Analysts and Programmers	GradIAP
Royal Anthropological Institute
Fellow of the Royal Anthropological Institute of Great Britain and Ireland	FRAI
Society of Antiquaries of London
Fellow of the Society of Antiquaries of London	FSA
Society of Antiquaries of Scotland
Fellow of the Society of Antiquaries of Scotland	FSAScot
Chartered Institute of Arbitrators
Fellow of the Chartered Institute of Arbitrators	FCIArb*
Member of the Chartered Institute of Arbitrators	MCIArb*
Associate of the Chartered Institute of Arbitrators	ACIArb*
Chartered Institute for Archaeologists
Member of the Chartered Institute for Archaeologists	MCIfA
Associate of the Chartered Institute for Archaeologists	ACIfA
Practitioner of the Chartered Institute for Archaeologists	PCIfA
Architects Registration Board
Registered Architect in the United Kingdom	ARB
Royal Institute of Architects in Scotland
Fellow, Academic Fellow, or Retired Fellow of the Royal Institute of Architects in Scotland	FRIAS
Honorary Fellow of the Royal Institute of Architects in Scotland	Hon FRIAS
Chartered Institute of Architectural Technologists
Chartered Architectural Technologists	MCIAT*
Chartered Architectural Technologists and Fellow of the Chartered Institute of Architectural Technologists	FCIAT
Associate Member of the Chartered Institute of Architectural Technologists	ACIAT
The Royal College of Art
Fellow of the Royal College of Art	FRCA
The Royal Society of Arts
Fellow of the Royal Society of Arts	FRSA
Royal Designer for Industry	RDI
The Royal Scottish Society of Arts
Fellow of the Royal Scottish Society of Arts	FRSSA
Archives and Records Association
Registered Member of the Archives and Records Association	RMARA
Royal Asiatic Society of Great Britain and Ireland
Fellow of the Royal Asiatic Society of Great Britain and Ireland	FRAS (Note: No post-nominals are assigned by the society in its regulations; the use of the post-nominal letters FRAS is however recognized by many reference works.)
Institute of Asset Management
Fellow of the Institute of Asset Management	FIAM
Member of the Institute of Asset Management	MIAM
Royal Astronomical Society
Fellow of the Royal Astronomical Society	FRAS
Institute of Automotive Engineer Assessors
Fellow of the Institute of Automotive Engineer Assessors	F.Inst.I.A.E.A.
Member of the Institute of Automotive Engineer Assessors	M.Inst.I.A.E.A.
Associate Member of the Institute of Automotive Engineer Assessors	A.Inst.I.A.E.A.
B
Society of Bereavement Practitioners
Fellow of The Society of Bereavement Practitioners	FSPB
Accredited Member of The Society of Bereavement Practitioners	MSPB(Acc)
Member of The Society of Bereavement Practitioners	MSPB
Society of British & Commonwealth Entrepreneurs
Honorary Fellow of the Society of British & Commonwealth Entrepreneurs	HonFSBCE
Honorary Member of the Society of British & Commonwealth Entrepreneurs	HonMSBCE
Fellow of the Society of British & Commonwealth Entrepreneurs	FSBCE
Member of the Society of British & Commonwealth Entrepreneurs	MSBCE
Royal Society of Biology
Associate member of the Royal Society of Biology	AMRSB
Member of the Royal Society of Biology	MRSB
Fellow of the Royal Society of Biology	FRSB
Institute of Biomedical Science
Fellow of the Institute of Biomedical Science	FIBMS
Member of the Institute of Biomedical Science	MIBMS
Licentiate of the Institute of Biomedical Science	LIBMS
The Institute of Boarding (Part of the BSA Group)
Supporting Member of The Institute of Boarding	STIOB
Associate Member of The Institute of Boarding	ATIOB
Member of The Institute of Boarding	MTIOB
Fellow/Fellow Emeritus Member of The Institute of Boarding	FTIOB
Royal Institute of British Architects
Past President (Note: Note the President uses the statement "President, RIBA" but does not gain specific post-nominals) of the Royal Institute of British Architects	PPRIBA
Honorary Fellow of the Royal Institute of British Architects	Hon. FRIBA
International Fellow of the Royal Institute of British Architects	Int. FRIBA
Chartered Member of the Royal Institute of British Architects	RIBA
Initials still allowed for use if granted prior to the 1971 charter:
Fellow of the Royal Institute of British Architects	FRIBA
Associate of the Royal Institute of British Architects	ARIBA
Licentiate of the Royal Institute of British Architects	LRIBA
British Occupational Hygiene Society	
Chartered Member of the Faculty of Occupational Hygiene	CMFOH
Licentiate of the Faculty of Occupational Hygiene	LFOH
Associate of the Faculty of Occupational Hygiene	AFOH
Member of the Faculty of Asbestos Assessment and Management	MFAAM
Institute of Builders' Merchants
Fellow of the Institute of Builders' Merchants	FIBM
Member of the Institute of Builders' Merchants	MIBM
Chartered Institute of Building
Fellow of the Chartered Institute of Building	FCIOB
Chartered Member of the Chartered Institute of Building (Chartered Construction Manager or Chartered Builder)	MCIOB*
Initials still allowed for use (until 2025) if granted prior to 1 July 2015:
Associate member of the Chartered Institute of Building	ACIOB*
Incorporated member of the Chartered Institute of Building	ICIOB
Chartered Association of Building Engineers
Fellow of the Chartered Association of Building Engineers	FCABE
Member of the Chartered Association of Building Engineers	MCABE
Associate member of the Chartered Association of Building Engineers	ACABE
Graduate member of the Chartered Association of Building Engineers	GradCABE
Chartered Institution of Building Services Engineers
Fellow of the Chartered Institution of Building Services Engineers	FCIBSE
Member of the Chartered Institution of Building Services Engineers	MCIBSE*
Associate of the Chartered Institution of Building Services Engineers	ACIBSE
Licentiate of the Chartered Institution of Building Services Engineers	LCIBSE
Forum for the Built Environment
Fellow of the Forum for the Built Environment	FFB
Member of the Forum for the Built Environment	MFB
Burgon Society
Fellow of the Burgon Society	FBS
Business Continuity Institute
Fellow of the Business Continuity Institute	FBCI
Associate Fellow of the Business Continuity Institute	AFBCI
Member of the Business Continuity Institute	MBCI
Associate Member of the Business Continuity Institute	AMBCI
C
Institute of Chartered Accountants in England & Wales
Chartered Accountant (Associate of the Institute of Chartered Accountants in England & Wales)	ACA*
Chartered Accountant (Fellow of the Institute of Chartered Accountants in England & Wales)	FCA*
Institute of Chartered Accountants of Scotland
Chartered Accountant (Member of the Institute of Chartered Accountants)	CA*
Association of Chartered Certified Accountants
Chartered Certified Accountant (Fellow of the Association of Chartered Certified Accountants)	FCCA*
Chartered Certified Accountant (Member of the Association of Chartered Certified Accountants)	ACCA*
Institute of Chartered Foresters
Fellow of the Institute of Chartered Foresters	FICFor
Member of the Institute of Chartered Foresters	MICFor*
The Chartered Governance Institute, formerly Institute of Chartered Secretaries and Administrators
Fellow of The Chartered Governance Institute	FCG/FCIS
Associate of The Chartered Governance Institute	ACG/ACIS
Affiliate of The Chartered Governance Institute	CG (Affiliated)/CIS (Affiliated)
Graduate Member of The Chartered Governance Institute	GradCG/GradICSA
Royal Institution of Chartered Surveyors
Fellow of the Royal Institution of Chartered Surveyors	FRICS
Member of the Royal Institution of Chartered Surveyors	MRICS*
Associate of the Royal Institution of Chartered Surveyors	AssocRICS*
Institution of Chemical Engineers
Fellow of the Institution of Chemical Engineers	FIChemE
Member of the Institution of Chemical Engineers	MIChemE*
Associate Member of the Institution of Chemical Engineers	AMIChemE
Royal Society of Chemistry
Fellow of the Royal Society of Chemistry	FRSC
Member of the Royal Society of Chemistry	MRSC
Associate Member of the Royal Society of Chemistry	AMRSC
Royal College of Chiropractors
Members of one of the specialist faculties add the abbreviation for that faculty in parentheses after the post-nominal for their membership level:
Pain Faculty	(Pain)
Animal Faculty	(Animal)
Pregnancy & Paediatrics Faculty	(Paeds)
Sport & Exercise Faculty	(Sport)
Orthopaedics & Rehabilitation Faculty	(Ortho)
Fellow of the Royal College of Chiropractors	FRCC
Member of the Royal College of Chiropractors	MRCC
Licentiate of the Royal College of Chiropractors	LRCC
The Churchill Fellowship
Churchill Fellow	CF
British Society of Cinematographers
Full Member of the British Society of Cinematographers	BSC
Associate Member of the British Society of Cinematographers	Assoc. BSC (Note: May be used in correspondence, etc., but not in screen credits)
Institute for Civil Protection & Emergency Management
Fellow of the Institute for Civil Protection & Emergency Management	FICPEM
Member of the Institute for Civil Protection & Emergency Management	MICPEM
Associate Member of the Institute for Civil Protection & Emergency Management	AMICPEM
Institution of Civil Engineers
Fellow of the Institution of Civil Engineers	FICE
Member of the Institution of Civil Engineers	MICE*
Associate Member of the Institution of Civil Engineers	AMICE
Graduate Member of the Institution of Civil Engineers	GMICE
Chartered Institution of Civil Engineering Surveyors
Fellow of the Chartered Institution of Civil Engineering Surveyors	FCInstCES
Member of the Chartered Institution of Civil Engineering Surveyors	MCInstCES
Technical Member of the Chartered Institution of Civil Engineering Surveyors	TCInstCES
Graduate Member of the Chartered Institution of Civil Engineering Surveyors	GCInstCES
Associate Apprentice of the Chartered Institution of Civil Engineering Surveyors	ACInstCES
Institute of Clinical Research
Registered member of the Institute of Clinical Research	RICR
Professional member of the Institute of Clinical Research	MICR
Fellow of the Institute of Clinical Research	FICR
British Computer Society
Fellow of the British Computer Society	FBCS
Member of the British Computer Society	MBCS
Associate Member of the British Computer Society	AMBCS
Institute of Concrete Technology
Fellow of the Institute of Concrete Technology	FICT
Institute of Consulting
Fellow of the Institute of Consulting	FIC
Member of the Institute of Consulting	MIC
Associate of the Institute of Consulting	AIC
Institute of Continuing Professional Development
Fellow of the Institute of Continuing Professional Development	FInstCPD
Member of the Institute of Continuing Professional Development	MInstCPD
Institute for Continuous Improvement in Public Services
Fellow of the Institute for Continuous Improvement in Public Services	FICiPS
Practitioner of the Institute for Continuous Improvement in Public Services	PICiPS
Member of the Institute for Continuous Improvement in Public Services	MICiPS
Institute of Corporate Responsibility and Sustainability
Fellow of the Institute of Corporate Responsibility and Sustainability	FICRS
Member of the Institute of Corporate Responsibility and Sustainability	MICRS
Associate of the Institute of Corporate Responsibility and Sustainability	AICRS
British Association for Counselling and Psychotherapy
Member of the British Association for Counselling and Psychotherapy	MBACP
Accredited Member of the British Association for Counselling and Psychotherapy	MBACP (Accred.)
Senior Accredited Member of the British Association for Counselling and Psychotherapy	MBACP (Snr Accred.)
Society of Crematorium Organists
Fellow of the Society of Crematorium Organists	FSCO
CREST – The professional body for the technical security industry
Fellow of CREST	FCREST
The Cybernetics Society
Fellow of the Cybernetics Society	FCybS
Member of the Cybernetics Society	MCybS
Honorary Fellow of the Cybernetics Society	HonFCybS
D
Royal United Services Institute for Defence & Security Studies
Fellow of the Royal United Services Institute for Defence & Security Studies	FRUSI
Chartered Society of Designers
Fellow of the Chartered Society of Designers	FCSD
Member of the Chartered Society of Designers	MCSD
British Dietetic Association
Fellow of the British Dietetic Association	FBDA
Member of the British Dietetic Association	MBDA
Institute of Directors
Fellow of the Institute of Directors	FIoD
Member of the Institute of Directors	MIoD
Association of British Dispensing Opticians
Fellow of the Association of British Dispensing Opticians	FBDO
Roll of Distinguished Philatelists
Signatory to the Roll of Distinguished Philatelists	RDP
Society of Dyers and Colourists
Fellow of the Society of Dyers and Colourists	FSDC
Licentiate of the Society of Dyers and Colourists	LSDC*
Associate of the Society of Dyers and Colourists	ASDC
E
Chartered Institute of Ecology and Environmental Management
Fellow of the Chartered Institute of Ecology and Environmental Management	FCIEEM
Member of the Chartered Institute of Ecology and Environmental Management	MCIEEM
Royal Economic Society
Fellow of the Royal Economic Society	FREcon
Educational Institute of Scotland
Fellow of the Educational Institute of Scotland	FEIS
Institution of Electrical Engineers
Fellow of the Institution of Electrical Engineers	FIEE
Member of the Institution of Electrical Engineers	MIEE
British Institute of Embalmers
Member of the British Institute of Embalmers	MBIE
Faculty of Emergency Nursing
Associate of the Faculty of Emergency Nursing	AFEN
Member of the Faculty of Emergency Nursing	MFEN
Fellow of the Faculty of Emergency Nursing	FFEN
Emergency Planning Society
Fellow of the Emergency Planning Society	FEPS
Member of the Emergency Planning Society	MEPS
Associate Member of the Emergency Planning Society	AMEPS
Energy Institute
Associate Member of the Energy Institute	AMEI
Member of the Energy Institute	MEI*
Fellow of the Energy Institute	FEI*
Bureau of Engineer Surveyors
Fellow of the Bureau of Engineer Surveyors	FBES
Member of the Bureau of Engineer Surveyors	MBES
Associate Member of the Bureau of Engineer Surveyors	AMBES
Institution of Engineering and Technology
Honorary Fellow of the Institution of Engineering and Technology	HonFIET
Fellow of the Institution of Engineering and Technology	FIET
Member of the Institution of Engineering and Technology	MIET*
Technician Member of the Institution of Engineering and Technology	TMIET
Institution of Engineering Designers
Fellow of the Institution of Engineering Designers	FIED
Member of the Institution of Engineering Designers	MIED
Associate of the Institution of Engineering Designers	AIED
Institution of Engineers in Scotland
Fellow of the Institution of Engineers in Scotland	FIES
Member of the Institution of Engineers in Scotland	MIES
Royal Entomological Society
Honorary Fellow of the Royal Entomological Society	Hon.FRES
Fellow of the Royal Entomological Society	FRES
Member of the Royal Entomological Society	Mem.RES
Chartered Institute of Environmental Health
Fellow of the Chartered Institute of Environmental Health	FCIEH
Member of the Chartered Institute of Environmental Health	MCIEH
Royal Environmental Health Institute of Scotland
Fellow of the Royal Environmental Health Institute of Scotland	FREHIS
Member of the Royal Environmental Health Institute of Scotland	MREHIS
Institute of Event Management
Fellow of the Institute of Event Management	FIEM
Member of the Institute of Event Management	MIEM
Associate of the Institute of Event Management	AIEM
The Academy of Experts
Associate Member (AMAE) of The Academy of Experts	AMAE
Full Member of The Academy of Experts	MAE
Fellow of The Academy of Experts	FAE
Qualified Dispute Resolver (Mediator)	QDR
Institute of Explosives Engineers
Fellow of the Institute of Explosives Engineers	FIExpE
Member of the Institute of Explosives Engineer	MIExpE
Executive and Personal Assistants' Association	
Affiliate Professional of the Executive and Personal Assistants' Association	APEPAA
Associate of the Executive and Personal Assistants' Association	AEPAA
Member of the Executive and Personal Assistants' Association	MEPAA
Fellow of the Executive and Personal Assistants' Association	FEPAA
F
Worshipful Company of Farriers
Associateship of the Worshipful Company of Farriers	AWCF
Fellowship of the Worshipful Company of Farriers	FWCF
Institute of Financial Accountants
Fellow Tax Adviser	FTA
Associate Financial Accountant	AFA MIPA
Fellow Financial Accountant	FFA FIPA
Associate Tax Adviser	ATA
Intermediate Financial Accountant	IFA AIPA (Note: Where compound post-nominals are used, the second component signifies alignment with membership of the Australian Institute of Public Accountants (with which the IFA is partnered).)
Institution of Fire Engineers
Graduate of the Institution of Fire Engineers	GIFireE
Member of the Institution of Fire Engineers	MIFireE
The Institute of Fire Safety Managers
Fellow of The Institute of Fire Safety Managers	FIFSM
Member of The Institute of Fire Safety Managers	MIFSM
Associate of The Institute of Fire Safety Managers	AIFSM
Technician of The Institute of Fire Safety Managers	TIFSM
Student of The Institute of Fire Safety Managers	SIFSM
Honorary Member of The Institute of Fire Safety Managers	Hon MIFSM
Institute of Food Science & Technology
Fellow of the Institute of Food Science and Technology	FIFST
Member of the Institute of Food Science and Technology	MIFST
The Chartered Society of Forensic Science	
Fellow of the Chartered Society of Forensic Science	FCSFS
Member of the Chartered Society of Forensic Science	MCSFS
Associate of the Chartered Society of Forensic Science	ACSFS
G
Worshipful Company of Gunmakers
Master Gunmaker of the Worshipful Company of Gunmakers	MAsR.G
Institute of Gas Engineers and Managers
Note: Members (except Member Managers) and Fellows must also hold CEng, IEng, or EngTech
Fellow of the Institution of Gas Engineers and Managers	FIGEM
Member of the Institute of Gas Engineers and Managers	MIGEM*
Graduate Member of the Institute of Gas Engineers and Managers	GradIGEM
Gemmological Association of Great Britain (Gem-A)
Foundation in Gemmology Certificate	Cert. GA
Fellow of the Gemmological Association of Great Britain (Diploma in Gemmology)	FGA
Diamond Fellows of the Gemmological Association (Diamond Diploma)	DGA
Royal Geographical Society (with Institute of British Geographers)
Fellow of the Royal Geographical Society	FRGS
Royal Scottish Geographical Society
Fellow of the Royal Scottish Geographical Society	FRSGS
Geological Society of London
Fellow of the Geological Society of London	FGS
Guild of Liturgical Organists
Fellow of the Guild of Liturgical Organists	FGLO
H
College of Health Care Chaplains
Fellow of the College of Health Care Chaplains	FCHCC
British Society of Hearing Aid Audiologists
Fellow of the British Society of Hearing Aid Audiologists	FSHAA
Member of the British Society of Hearing Aid Audiologists	MSHAA
The Heraldry Society
Fellow of The Heraldry Society	FHS
Honorary Fellow of The Heraldry Society	HonFHS
The Heraldry Society's Diploma	DipHS
Higher Education Academy (formerly the Institute for Learning and Teaching in Higher Education)
Associate Fellow of the Higher Education Academy (formerly Associate)	AFHEA (formerly AHEA)
Fellow of the Higher Education Academy	FHEA
Senior Fellow of the Higher Education Academy	SFHEA
Principal Fellow of the Higher Education Academy	PFHEA
National Teaching Fellow of Advance HE	NTF
Member of the Institute for Learning and Teaching in Higher Education	ILTM (superseded by FHEA)
Association of Higher Education Professionals
Fellow of the Association of Higher Education Professionals	FAHEP
Accredited Member of the Association of Higher Education Professionals	AMAHEP
Member of the Association of Higher Education Professionals	MAHEP
Institute of Highway Engineers
Fellow of the Institute of Highway Engineers	FIHE
Member of the Institute of Highway Engineers	MIHE
Associate Member of the Institute of Highway Engineers	AMIHE
Apprentice Member of the Institute of Highway Engineers	APPIHE
Road Safety Auditors Register of the Institute of Highway Engineers	RegRSA (IHE)
Chartered Institution of Highways and Transportation
Fellow of the Chartered Institution of Highways and Transportation	FCIHT
Member of the Chartered Institution of Highways and Transportation	MCIHT
Associate Member of the Chartered Institution of Highways and Transportation	AMCIHT
Historical Association
Fellow of the Historical Association	FHA
Royal Historical Society
Member of the Royal Historical Society	MRHistS
Fellow of the Royal Historical Society	FRHistS
British Horological Institute
Fellow of the British Horological Institute	FBHI
Member of the British Horological Institute	MBHI
Licentiate of the British Horological Institute	LBHI
Institute of Hospitality
Fellow of the Institute of Hospitality	FIH
Member of the Institute of Hospitality	MIH
Associate Member of the Institute of Hospitality	AIH
Chartered Institute of Housing
Fellow of the Chartered Institute of Housing	FCIH (obsolete but allowed if previously granted)
Chartered Institute of Housing Chartered Member	CIH Chartered Member or CIHCM
Member of the Chartered Institute of Housing	CIH Member or CIHM (MCIH* (obsolete))
Associate of the Chartered Institute of Housing	ACIH (obsolete)
I
Chartered Institute of Information Security
Fellow of the Chartered Institute of Information Security	FCIIS
Member of the Chartered Institute of Information Security	MCIIS
Associate of the Chartered Institute of Information Security	ACIIS
Accredited Affiliate of the Chartered Institute of Information Security	AfCIIS
British Institute of Innkeeping
Fellow of the British Institute of Innkeeping	FBII
Member of the British Institute of Innkeeping	MBII
Chartered Insurance Institute
Award Qualified member of the Chartered Insurance Institute	CII (Award)
Certificate Qualified member of the Chartered Insurance Institute	Cert CII
Diploma qualified member of the Chartered Insurance Institute	DipCII
Associate of the Chartered Insurance Institute (Chartered Insurer/Chartered Insurance Practitioner/Chartered Insurance Broker)	ACII*
Fellow of the Chartered Insurance Institute	FCII
Institute of Interim Management
Companion of the Institute of Interim Management	CIIM
Member of the Institute of Interim Management	MIIM
Associate of the Institute of Interim Management	AIIM
Chartered Institute of Internal Auditors
Certified Internal Auditor	CIA
Qualification in Internal Audit Leadership	QIAL
Chartered Internal Auditor	CMIIA
Irish Guild of Organists and Choristers
Fellow of the Irish Guild of Organists and Choristers	FIGOC
Licentiate of the Irish Guild of Organists and Choristers	LIGOC (suspended)
Associate of the Irish Guild of Organists and Choristers	AIGOC
Institute of IT Training
Companion of the Institute of IT Training	CIITT
Fellow of the Institute of IT Training	FIITT
Member of the Institute of IT Training	MIITT
Institute Certified Training Practitioner (Institute of IT Training)	ICTP
Senior Associate Member of the Institute of IT Training	SIITT
Associate Member of the Institute of IT Training	AIITT
Institute of Supply Chain Management
Learner Institute of Supply Chain Management	LSCM
Affiliate Member Institute of Supply Chain Management	AFSCM
Member of the Institute of Supply Chain Management	MSCM
Associate Member Institute of Supply Chain Management	ASCM
Professional Member Institute of Supply Chain Management	PSCM
Expert Member Institute of Supply Chain Management	ESCM
Consultant Member Institute of Supply Chain Management	CSCM
Fellow of Institute of Supply Chain Management	FSCM
J
Chartered Institute of Journalists
Member of the Chartered Institute of Journalists	MCIJ
Fellow of the Chartered Institute of Journalists	FCIJ
K
British Kinematograph, Sound and Television Society
Fellow of the British Kinematograph, Sound and Television Society	FBKS
Member of the British Kinematograph, Sound and Television Society	MBKS
L
Landscape Institute
Fellow of the Landscape Institute	FLI
Chartered Member of the Landscape Institute	CMLI
Institute of Leadership
Fellow of the Institute of Leadership	FIoL
Member of the Institute of Leadership	MIoL
Associate Member of the Institute of Leadership	AMIoL
Affiliate of the Institute of Leadership	AIoL
Institute for Learning
Fellow of the Institute for Learning	FIfL
Member of the Institute for Learning	MIfL
British Institute for Learning and Development
Associate of the British Institute for Learning & Development	ABILD
Member of the British Institute for Learning & Development	MBILD
Fellow of the British Institute for Learning & Development	FBILD
Association for Learning Technology
Certified Member of the Association for Learning Technology	CMALT
Institute of Licensed Trade Stock Auditors
Fellow of the Institute of Licensed Trade Stock Auditors	FILSA
Member of the Institute of Licensed Trade Stock Auditors	MILSA
Chartered Institute of Linguists
Fellow of the Chartered Institute of Linguists	FCIL
Member of the Chartered Institute of Linguists	MCIL
Associate of the Chartered Institute of Linguists	ACIL
Linnean Society of London
Fellow of the Linnean Society of London	FLS
Associate of the Linnean Society of London	ALS
The Royal Society of Literature
Companion of Literature	Clit FRSL
Fellow of the Royal Society of Literature	FRSL
Member of the Royal Society of Literature	RSLM
Society of Local Council Clerks
Principal Member of Society of Local Council Clerks	PSLCC
Fellow of Society of Local Council Clerks	FSLCC
Chartered Institute of Logistics and Transport in the UK
Fellow of The Chartered Institute of Logistics and Transport (UK)	FCILT
Chartered Member of The Chartered Institute of Logistics and Transport (UK)	CMILT
Member of The Chartered Institute of Logistics and Transport (UK)	MILT
Chartered Institute of Library and Information Professionals (CILIP)
Fellow of the Chartered Institute of Library and Information Professionals	FCLIP
Chartered Member of the Chartered Institute of Library and Information Professionals	MCLIP
Associate Member of the Chartered Institute of Library and Information Professionals	ACLIP
M
The Magic Circle
Member of The Magic Circle	MMC
Associate of The Inner Magic Circle	AIMC
Member of The Inner Magic Circle	MIMC
Chartered Institute of Management Accountants
Fellow of the Chartered Institute of Management Accountants	FCMA
Associate of the Chartered Institute of Management Accountants	ACMA*
Chartered Global Management Accountant (Note: Not a Privy Council approved individual chartered designation)	CGMA (Note: Issued jointly with the American Institute of Certified Public Accountants and used alongside FCMA or ACMA by CIMA members)
Chartered Management Institute
Companion of the Chartered Management Institute	CCMI
Fellow of the Chartered Management Institute	FCMI
Member of the Chartered Management Institute	MCMI
Associate member of the Chartered Management Institute	ACMI
Institute of Management Services	
Fellow of the Institute of Management Services	FMS
Member of the Institute of Management Services	MMS
Associate member of the Institute of Management Services	AMS
Chartered Institute of Marketing
Fellow of the Chartered Institute of Marketing	FCIM
Member of the Chartered Institute of Marketing	MCIM*
Associate of the Chartered Institute of Marketing	ACIM
Institute of Marine Engineering Science and Technology
Honorary Fellow of the Institute of Marine Engineering Science and Technology	HonFIMarEST
Fellow of the Institute of Marine Engineering Science and Technology	FIMarEST
Member of the Institute of Marine Engineering Science and Technology	MIMarEST
Associate Member of the Institute of Marine Engineering Science and Technology	AMIMarEST
International Institute of Marine Surveying
Honorary Fellow of the International Institute of Marine Surveying	HonFIIMS
Honorary Member of the International Institute of Marine Surveying	HonMIIMS
Full Member of the International Institute of Marine Surveying	MIIMS
Associate Member of the International Institute of Marine Surveying	AssocIIMS
Technician Member of the International Institute of Marine Surveying	TechIIMS
Institute of Masters of Wine
Member of the Institute of Masters of Wine (Master of Wine)	MW
Institute of Materials, Minerals and Mining
Fellow of the Institute of Materials, Minerals and Mining	FIMMM
Professional Member of the Institute of Materials, Minerals and Mining	MIMMM
Associate Member of the Institute of Materials, Minerals and Mining	AIMMM
Professional Graduate of the Institute of Materials, Minerals and Mining	ProfGradIMMM
Graduate of the Institute of Materials, Minerals and Mining	GradIMMM
Technician Member of the Institute of Materials, Minerals and Mining	TIMMM
Academy for the Mathematical Sciences
Fellow of the Academy for the Mathematical Sciences	FAcadMathSci
Institute of Mathematics and its Applications
Fellow of the Institute of Mathematics and its Applications	FIMA
Member of the Institute of Mathematics and its Applications	MIMA
Associate Member of the Institute of Mathematics and its Applications	AMIMA
The Marine Biological Association
Fellow of the Marine Biological Association	FMBA
Professional Member of the Marine Biological Association	Mem.MBA
Institute of Measurement and Control
Honorary Fellow of the Institute of Measurement and Control	HonFInstMC
Fellow of the Institute of Measurement and Control	FInstMC
Member of the Institute of Measurement and Control	MInstMC*
Technician Member of the Institute of Measurement and Control	TInstMC
Institution of Mechanical Engineers
Fellow of the Institution of Mechanical Engineers	FIMechE
Member of the Institution of Mechanical Engineers	MIMechE
Associate Member of the Institution of Mechanical Engineers	AMIMechE
Academy of Medical Educators
Fellow of the Academy of Medical Educators	FAcadMEd
Member of the Academy of Medical Educators	MAcadMEd
Faculty of Medical Leadership and Management
Member of the Faculty of Medical Leadership and Management of the Academy of Medical Royal Colleges	MFMLM
Academy of Medical Sciences
Fellow of the Academy of Medical Sciences	FMedSci
The Royal Society of Medicine
Fellow of the Royal Society of Medicine	FRSM
Honorary Fellow of the Royal Society of Medicine	HonFRSM
President of the Royal Society of Medicine	PRSM
Past President of the Royal Society of Medicine	PPRSM
Royal Meteorological Society
Fellow of the Royal Meteorological Society	FRMetS
Royal Microscopical Society
Honorary Fellow of the Royal Microscopical Society	HonFRMS
Fellow of the Royal Microscopical Society	FRMS
Institute of the Motor Industry
Fellow of the Institute of the Motor Industry	FIMI
Member of the Institute of the Motor Industry	MIMI
Associate Member of the Institute of the Motor Industry	AMIMI
Licentiate Member of the Institute of the Motor Industry	LIMI
Affiliate Member of the Institute of the Motor Industry	AffIMI
Certified Automotive Engineer of the Institute of the Motor Industry	CAE
Advanced Automotive Engineer of the Institute of the Motor Industry	AAE
Incorporated Society of Musicians
Fellow of the Incorporated Society of Musicians (15 years continuous membership)	FISM
Member of the Incorporated Society of Musicians	MISM
Student Member of the Incorporated Society of Musicians	SMISM
National College of Music
Fellow of the National College of Music	FNCM
N
British Naturalists' Association
Fellow of the British Naturalists' Association (Honoris Causa)	HonFBNA
Fellow of the British Naturalists' Association	FBNA
Registered Member of the British Naturalists' Association	MBNA
Registered Associate Member of the British Naturalists' Association	ABNA
Nautical Institute
Fellow of the Nautical Institute	FNI
Associate Fellow of the Nautical Institute	AFNI
Member of the Nautical Institute	MNI
Associate Member of the Nautical Institute	AMNI
Royal Institution of Naval Architects
Fellow of the Royal Institution of Naval Architects	FRINA
Member of the Royal Institution of Naval Architects	MRINA
Associate Member of the Royal Institution of Naval Architects	AMRINA
Associate of the Royal Institution of Naval Architects	AssocRINA
Royal Institute of Navigation
Fellow of the Royal Institute of Navigation	FRIN
Associate Fellow of the Royal Institute of Navigation	AFRIN
Member of the Royal Institute of Navigation	MRIN
Nuclear Institute
Fellow of the Nuclear Institute	FNucI
Member of the Nuclear Institute	MNucl
Royal Numismatic Society
Fellow of the Royal Numismatic Society	FRNS
Association for Nutrition
Fellow of the Association for Nutrition	FAfN
Registered Nutritionist	RNutr
Registered Associate Nutritionist	ANutr
O
International Institute of Obsolescence Management
Fellow of International Institute of Obsolescence Management	FIIOM
Member of International Institute of Obsolescence Management	MIIOM
Institution of Occupational Safety and Health
Fellow of the Institution of Occupational Safety and Health	CFIOSH
Chartered Member of the Institution of Occupational Safety and Health	CMIOSH
Certified Member of the Institution of Occupational Safety and Health	CertIOSH
Society of Operations Engineers
Fellow of the Society of Operations Engineers	FSOE
Member of the Society of Operations Engineers	MSOE
Associate Member of the Society of Operations Engineers	AMSOE
The Operational Research Society
Fellow of The OR Society	FORS
Associate Fellow of The OR Society	AFORS
Associate of The OR Society	AORS
Candidate Associate of The OR Society	CandORS
Royal College of Organists
Colleague of the Royal College of Organists	CRCO
Associate of the Royal College of Organists	ARCO
Fellow of the Royal College of Organists	FRCO
P
Royal Society of Painter-Printmakers
Fellow of the Royal Society of Painter-Printmakers	RE
Associate of the Royal Society of Painter-Printmakers	ARE
President of the Royal Society of Painter-Printmakers	PRE
Past President of the Royal Society of Painter-Printmakers	PPRE
Vice-President of the Royal Society of Painter-Printmakers	VPRE
Honorary Fellow of the Royal Society of Painter-Printmakers	HonRE
Chartered Institute of Patent Attorneys
Fellow of the Chartered Institute of Patent Attorneys (Chartered Patent Agent or Chartered Patent Attorney (since June 2006))	CPA
Chartered Institute of Payroll Professionals
Fellow of the Chartered Institute of Payroll Professionals	FCIPP
Member of the Chartered Institute of Payroll Professionals	MCIPP
Permanent Way Institution
Fellow of the Permanent Way Institution	FPWI
Member of the Permanent Way Institution	MPWI
Personal Finance Society
Fellow of the Personal Finance Society	FPFS
Associate Member of the Personal Finance Society	APFS
Diploma Qualified Member of the Personal Finance Society	DipPFS
Certificate Qualified Member of the Personal Finance Society	CertPFS
Chartered Institute of Personnel and Development
Chartered Fellow of the Chartered Institute of Personnel and Development	Chartered FCIPD
Chartered Member of the Chartered Institute of Personnel and Development	Chartered MCIPD
Associate of the Chartered Institute of Personnel and Development	Assoc CIPD
Academic Fellow of the Chartered Institute of Personnel and Development	Academic FCIPD
Academic Member of the Chartered Institute of Personnel and Development	Academic MCIPD
Academic Associate of the Chartered Institute of Personnel and Development	Academic Assoc CIPD
Royal Pharmaceutical Society
Associate of the Royal Pharmaceutical Society	ARPharmS
Member of the Royal Pharmaceutical Society	MRPharmS
Pharmaceutical Scientist Member of the Royal Pharmaceutical Society	SRPharmS
Fellow of the Royal Pharmaceutical Society	FRPharmS
Royal Pharmaceutical Society Faculty
Stage I Royal Pharmaceutical Society Faculty member	MFRPSI
Stage II Royal Pharmaceutical Society Faculty member	MFRPSII
Royal Pharmaceutical Society Faculty Fellow	FFRPS
Royal Philatelic Society London
Member of the Royal Philatelic Society London	MRPSL
Fellow of the Royal Philatelic Society London	FRPSL
Cambridge Philosophical Society
Fellow of the Cambridge Philosophical Society	FCPS
Royal Photographic Society
Licentiate of the Royal Photographic Society	LRPS
Associate of the Royal Photographic Society	ARPS
Fellow of the Royal Photographic Society	FRPS
Qualified Imaging Scientist Royal Photographic Society	QIS LRPS
Graduate Imaging Scientist Royal Photographic Society	GIS ARPS
Accredited Imaging Scientist Royal Photographic Society	AIS ARPS
Accredited Senior Imaging Scientist Royal Photographic Society	ASIS FRPS
Qualified in Imaging in the Creative Industries Royal Photographic Society	QICI LRPS
Graduate in Imaging in the Creative Industries Royal Photographic Society	GICI ARPS
Accredited in Imaging in the Creative Industries Royal Photographic Society	AICI ARPS
Accredited Senior in Imaging in the Creative Industries Royal Photographic Society	ASICI FRPS
Institute of Physics
Honorary Fellow of the Institute of Physics	HonFInstP
Fellow of the Institute of Physics	FInstP
Member of the Institute of Physics	MInstP
Institute of Physics and Engineering in Medicine
Fellow of the Institute of Physics and Engineering in Medicine	FIPEM
Full Member of the Institute of Physics and Engineering in Medicine	MIPEM
Chartered Society of Physiotherapy
Member of the Chartered Society of Physiotherapy	MCSP
Fellow of the Chartered Society of Physiotherapy	FCSP
Institution of Plant Engineers
Fellow of the Institution of Plant Engineers	FIPlantE
Member of the Institution of Plant Engineers	MIPlantE
Associate Member of the Institution of Plant Engineers	AMIPlantE
Chartered Institute of Plumbing & Heating Engineering
Fellow of the Chartered Institute of Plumbing & Heating Engineering	FCIPHE
Member of the Chartered Institute of Plumbing & Heating Engineering	MCIPHE
Associate of the Chartered Institute of Plumbing & Heating Engineering	ACIPHE
Chartered Institute of Procurement & Supply
Fellow of the Chartered Institute of Procurement & Supply	FCIPS
Member of the Chartered Institute of Procurement & Supply	MCIPS
Society of Professional Engineers UK
Fellow of the Society of Professional Engineers UK	P.Eng, FSPE
Member of the Society of Professional Engineers UK	P.Eng, MSPE
Honorary Fellow of the Society of Professional Engineers UK	Hon FSPE
Associate of the Society of Professional Engineers UK	ASPE
Retired Fellow of the Society of Professional Engineers UK	Retd FSPE
Retired Member of the Society of Professional Engineers UK	Retd MSPE
Retired Associate Member of the Society of Professional Engineers UK	Retd ASPE
Institute of Professional Sound
Fellow of the Institute of Professional Sound	FIPS
Member of the Institute of Professional Sound	MIPS
Associate Member of the Institute of Professional Sound	AIPS
International Professional Security Association (IPSA)
Individual Member of the International Professional Security Association	MIPSA
Association for Project Management
Fellow of the Association for Project Management	FAPM
Member of the Association for Project Management	MAPM
Property Consultants Society
Fellow of the Property Consultants Society	FPCS
Associate of the Property Consultants Society	APCS
Royal Society of Portrait Painters
Member of the Royal Society of Portrait Painters	RP
President of the Royal Society of Portrait Painters	PRP
Past President of the Royal Society of Portrait Painters	PPRP
British Psychological Society
Member of the British Psychological Society	MBPsS
Associate Fellow of the British Psychological Society	AFBPsS
Fellow of the British Psychological Society	FBPsS
Chartered Institute of Public Relations
Fellow of the Chartered Institute of Public Relations	FCIPR
Member of the Chartered Institute of Public Relations	MCIPR
Associate of the Chartered Institute of Public Relations	ACIPR
Q
Chartered Quality Institute
Fellow of the Chartered Quality Institute	FCQI
Member of the Chartered Quality Institute	MCQI
Practitioner of the Chartered Quality Institute	PCQI
R
Institution of Railway Signal Engineers
Fellow of the Institution of Railway Signal Engineers	FIRSE
Member of the Institution of Railway Signal Engineers	MIRSE
Associate Member of the Institution of Railway Signal Engineers	AMIRSE
Institution of Railway Operators
Fellow of the Institution of Railway Operators	FCIRO
Member of the Institution of Railway Operators	MCIRO
Associate Member of the Institution of Railway Operators	ACIRO
Institute of Refrigeration
Fellow of the Institute of Refrigeration	FInstR
Member of the Institute of Refrigeration	MInstR
Technician Members of the Institute of Refrigeration	TMInstR
Associate Members of the Institute of Refrigeration	AMInstR
Regional Studies Association
Fellow of the Regional Studies Association	FeRSA
Member of the Regional Studies Association	MeRSA
Institute of Residential Property Management
Fellow of the Institute of Residential Property Management	FIRPM
Member of the Institute of Residential Property Management	MIRPM
Associate of the Institute of Residential Property Management	AIRPM
Institute of Risk Management
Certified Fellow of the Institute of Risk Management	CFIRM
Certified Member of the Institute of Risk Management	CMIRM
Full Member of the Institute of Risk Management	MIRM
Technical Specialist of the Institute of Risk Management	SIRM
Certificate Member of the Institute of Risk Management	IRMCert
International Institute of Risk & Safety Management
Fellow of the International Institute of Risk & Safety Management	FIIRSM
Member of the International Institute of Risk & Safety Management	MIIRSM
Associate of the International Institute of Risk & Safety Management	AIIRSM
Recognised Safety Practitioner with the International Institute of Risk & Safety Management	RSP
Royal Society for Public Health
Associate of the Royal Society for Public Health	AMRSPH
Member of the Royal Society for Public Health	MRSPH
Fellow of the Royal Society for Public Health	FRSPH
Institute of Road Transport Engineers
Fellow of the Institute of Road Transport Engineers	FIRTE
Member of the Institute of Road Transport Engineers	MIRTE
Associate Member of the Institute of Road Transport Engineers	AMIRTE
Institution of Royal Engineers
Fellow of the Institution of Royal Engineers	FInstRE
Member of the Institution of Royal Engineers	MInstRE
Honorary Member of the Institution of Royal Engineers	HonMInstRE
The Roman Catholic Society of Medicine
Fellow of The Roman Catholic Society of Medicine	FRCSMed
Member of The Roman Catholic Society of Medicine	MRCSMed
Associate of The Roman Catholic Society of Medicine	ARCSMed
Clergy Member of The Roman Catholic Society of Medicine	CRSCMed
Honorary Member of The Roman Catholic Society of Medicine	HRCSMed
S
Safety and Reliability Society (SaRS)
Fellow of the Safety and Reliability Society	FSaRS
Member of the Safety and Reliability Society	MSaRS
Institute of Scientific and Technical Communicators
Fellow of the Institute of Scientific and Technical Communicators	FISTC
Member of the Institute of Scientific and Technical Communicators	MISTC
Institute of Science and Technology
Fellow of the Institute of Science and Technology	FIScT
Member of the Institute of Science and Technology	MIScT
Associate of the Institute of Science and Technology	AssocIScT
Royal British Society of Sculptors
Fellow of the Royal British Society of Sculptors	FRBS
Member of the Royal British Society of Sculptors	MRBS
Institute Of Search And Technical Rescue
Technician of the Institute Of Search And Technical Rescue	TInSTR
Graduate of the Institute Of Search And Technical Rescue	GInSTR
Member of the Institute Of Search And Technical Rescue	MInSTR
Fellow of the Institute Of Search And Technical Rescue	FInSTR
Chartered Institute for Securities & Investment (CISI)
Fellow of the Chartered Institute for Securities & Investment (CISI)	FCSI
Member of the Chartered Institute for Securities & Investment (CISI)	MCSI
Associate of the Chartered Institute for Securities & Investment (CISI)	ACSI
The Security Institute
Fellow of The Security Institute	FSyI
Member of The Security Institute	MSyI
Associate of The Security Institute	ASyI
International Security Management Institute
Fellow of International Security Management Institute	F.ISMI
Institute of Chartered Shipbrokers
Fellow of the Institute of Chartered Shipbrokers	FICS
Member of the Institute of Chartered Shipbrokers	MICS
Academy of Social Sciences
Fellow of the Academy of Social Sciences	FAcSS
Academician of the Academy of Social Sciences (used 1999-2014)	AcSS
British Association of Social Workers
Member of the British Association of Social Workers	MBASW
Fellow of the British Association of Social Workers	FBASW
Society for Nautical Research
Fellow of the Society for Nautical Research	FSNR
Institute of Specialist Surveyors and Engineers
Fellow of the Institute of Specialist Surveyors and Engineers College of Fellows	FISSECOF or FInstSSECOF
Fellow of the Institute of Specialist Surveyors and Engineers	FISSE or FInstSSE
Senior Surveyor of the Institute of Specialist Surveyors and Engineers	SSISSE or SSInstSSE
Principal Associate of the Institute of Specialist Surveyors and Engineers	PAISSE or PAInstSSE
Associate of the Institute of Specialist Surveyors and Engineers	AISSE or AInstSSE
Faculty of Sports and Exercise Medicine
Fellow of the Faculty of Sports and Exercise Medicine	FFSEM (UK)
Member of the Faculty of Sports and Exercise Medicine	MFSEM (UK)
Diplomate of the Faculty of Sport and Exercise Medicine UK	DFSEM (UK)
Institute of Sport and Recreation Management
Member of the Institute of Sport and Recreation Management	M.Inst.SRM
Associate Member of the [nstitute of Sport and Recreation Management	A.Inst.SRM
Staff and Educational Development Association
Fellow of the Staff and Educational Development Association	FSEDA
Associate Fellow of the Staff and Educational Development Association	AFSEDA
Royal Statistical Society
Fellow of the Royal Statistical Society	FSS (pre-1992 Fellows Only)
Institution of Structural Engineers
Fellow of the Institution of Structural Engineers	FIStructE
Member of the Institution of Structural Engineers	MIStructE*
Associate of the Institution of Structural Engineers	AIStructE
Incorporated Member of the Institution of Structural Engineers	IMIStructE
Technician Member of the Institution of Structural Engineers	TMIStructE
Graduate Member of the Institution of Structural Engineers	GIStructE
Institute of Swimming
Fellow of the Institute of Swimming	FIOS
Member of the Institute of Swimming	MIOS
Institute for Systems Engineering (UK Chapter of INCOSE)
Registered or Professional member of the Institute (formerly INCOSE UK)	MIfSE (replaces MINCOSE)
T
Chartered Institute of Taxation
Chartered Tax Advisor	CTA
Chartered College of Teaching (formerly College of Teachers)
Honorary Fellow of the Chartered College of Teaching	HonFCCT
Fellow of the Chartered College of Teaching	FCCT
Honorary Member of the Chartered College of Teaching	HonMCCT
Member of the Chartered College of Teaching	MCCT
Historical Affiliate of the Chartered College of Teaching	FCollT, FCollP, MCollT, MCollP, AMCollT
The Textile Institute
Licentiate of the Textile Institute	LTI*
Associate of the Textile Institute	ATI
Fellow of the Textile Institute	FTI
Royal Town Planning Institute
Member of the Royal Town Planning Institute	MRTPI
Chartered Institute of Trade Mark Attorneys
Member of The Chartered Institute of Trade Mark Attorneys	MCITMA
Fellow of The Chartered Institute of Trade Mark Attorneys	FCITMA
Institute of Traffic Accident Investigators
Member of the Institute of Traffic Accident Investigators	MITAI
Associate Member of the Institute of Traffic Accident Investigators	AMITAI
Institute of Translation and Interpreting
Fellow of the Institute of Translation and Interpreting	FITI
Member of the Institute of Translation and Interpreting	MITI
Associate of the Institute of Translation and Interpreting	AITI
The Transport Planning Society
Member of the Transport Planning Society	MTPS
Royal Society of Tropical Medicine and Hygiene
Fellow of the Royal Society of Tropical Medicine and Hygiene	FRSTMH or FRSTM&H (obsolete)
Society of Trust and Estate Practitioners
Member of the Society of Trust and Estate Practitioners	TEP
U
UK Registry of Emergency Medical Technicians
Fellow of the UK Registry of Emergency Medical Technicians	EMT-F
Member of the UK Registry of Emergency Medical Technicians	EMT-R
To use the post-nominals EMT-F or EMT-R person must appear on the managed voluntary register held by the UKREMT
V
W
Chartered Institution of Wastes Management
Member of the Chartered Institution of Wastes Management	MCIWM or CRWM
Fellow of the Chartered Institution of Wastes Management	FCIWM
The Institute of Water
Corporate Member of the Institute of Water	MIWater
Fellow of the Institute of Water	FIWater
British Watch and Clock Makers' Guild
Member of the British Watch and Clock Makers' Guild	MBWCG
Royal West of England Academy
President of the Royal West of England Academy	PRWA
Past President of the Royal West of England Academy	PPRWA
Vice-President of the Royal West of England Academy	VPRWA
Royal West of England Academician	RWA
Associate of the Royal West of England Academy	ARWA
Honorary Royal West of England Academician	HonRWA
The Society of Writers to His Majesty's Signet (Note: According to Debrett's and Black's, listed after fellowships of learned societies, royal academicians, and memberships of professional bodies. Debrett's lists Writers to the Signet before MPs, while Black's lists them together.)
Writer to the Signet	WS
Associate Writer to the Signet	AWS
The Society of Will Writers
Companion of The Society of Will Writers	Cmpn.SWW
Fellow of The Society of Will Writers	FSWW
Associate of The Society of Will Writers	ASWW
Member of The Society of Will Writers	MSWW
Affiliated Member of The Society of Will Writers	Aff.SWW
Women's Engineering Society
Fellow of the Women's Engineering Society	FWES
Associate Fellow of the Women's Engineering Society	AFWES
Honorary Member of the Women's Engineering Society	HonMWES
Member of the Women's Engineering Society	MWES
Associate Member of the Women's Engineering Society	AMWES
X
Y
Z
Fellow of the London Zoological Society	FZS

=== Chartered and other professional statuses ===
Some bodies award Chartered and other professional statuses with separate designatory letters from those indicating membership. These letters are placed before the designatory letters for fellowship or membership of the awarding body, e.g. CPhys MInstP. Where chartered status is a membership level within an institute, this is shown under that institute's entry above, e.g. Chartered Architectural Technologists, MCIAT, or Chartered Tax Advisor, CTA.

British Society of Animal Science
Registered Animal Scientist	RAnimSci
Registered Animal Technologist	RAnimTechnol
Institute of Asset Management
Asset Management Professional	AMP
Royal Society of Biology
Chartered Biologist	CBiol*
Association of Building Engineers
Chartered Building Engineer	CBuildE
Royal Society of Chemistry
Chartered Chemist	CChem*
British Computer Society
Chartered Information Technology Professional	CITP*
Registered Information Technology Technician	RITTech*
Institute of Conservation
Accredited Member of the Institute of Conservation	ACR
UK Cyber Security Council
Chartered Cyber Security Professional	ChCSP
Institute of Directors
Chartered Director	CDir
Society of Dyers and Colourists
Chartered Colourist	CCol*
Bodies licensed by the Engineering Council
Chartered Engineer	CEng*
International Professional Engineer (UK)	IntPE(UK)
Incorporated Engineer	IEng*
Engineering Technician	EngTech*
ICT Technician	ICTTech*
Bodies licensed by the Society for the Environment
Chartered Environmentalist	CEnv
Chartered Institute of Environmental Health
Registered Chartered Environmental Health Practitioner	CEnvH*
Registered Environmental Health Practitioner	REnvH*
Royal Environmental Health Institute of Scotland
Chartered Environmental Health Officer	Ch.EHO*
Environmental Health Officer	EHO*
Institute of Food Science & Technology
Registered Food Auditor	RFoodAM
Registered Food Mentor	RFoodM
Registered Food Safety Principal	RFoodSP
Registered Food Safety Manager	RFoodSM
Registered Food Safety Practitioner	RFoodSPrac
Registered Food Safety Technician	RFoodSTech
Registered Sensory Scientist	RSensSci
Chartered Institution for Further Education
Associate of the Chartered Institution for Further Education	ACFE
Licentiate of the Chartered Institution for Further Education	LCFE
Fellow of the Chartered Institution for Further Education	FCFE
Certificate of Standard Apprenticeship	CSA
Certificate of Advanced Apprenticeship	CAA
Certificate of Higher Apprenticeship	CHA
Certificate of Graduate Apprenticeship	CGA
Royal Geographical Society
Chartered Geographer	CGeog*
Chartered Geographer (Economic)	CGeog (Econ)
Chartered Geographer (GIS)	CGeog (GIS)
Chartered Geographer (Geomorphology)	CGeog (Geomorph)
Chartered Geographer (Teacher)	CGeog (Teacher)
Geological Society of London
Chartered Geologist	CGeol*
Chartered Institution of Highways and Transportation
Chartered Transport Planning Professional	CTPP
Chartered Institute of Horticulture
Chartered Horticulturist	CHort
Chartered Institute of Linguists
Chartered Linguist	CL
Chartered Management Institute
Chartered Manager	CMgr*
Institute of Marine Engineering, Science and Technology
Chartered Marine Engineer	CMarEng*
Incorporated Marine Engineer	IMarEng
Marine Engineering Technician	MarEngTech
Chartered Marine Scientist	CMarSci
Registered Marine Scientist	RMarSci
Chartered Marine Technologist	CMarTech
Registered Marine Technologist	RMarTech
Marine Technician	MarTech
Honourable Company of Master Mariners	
Chartered Master Mariner	CMMar
Chartered Institute of Marketing
Chartered Marketer	CMktr
Institute of Mathematics and its Applications
Chartered Mathematician	CMath*
Chartered Mathematics Teacher	CMathTeach*
Royal Meteorological Society
Chartered Meteorologist	CMet*
Registered Meteorologist	RMet
Institute of Physics
Chartered Physicist	CPhys*
Association for Project Management
Chartered Project Professional	ChPP
Registered Project Professional	RPP
Chartered Institute of Public Relations
Chartered Public Relations Practitioner	Chart.PR
Chartered Quality Institute
Chartered Quality Professional	CQP
Bodies licensed by the Science Council
Chartered Scientist	CSci*
Chartered Science Teacher	CSciTeach
Registered Scientist	RSci
Registered Science Technician	RSciTech
Bodies licensed by the Worshipful Company of Security Professionals
Chartered Security Professional	CSyP
Royal Statistical Society
Chartered Statistician	CStat*
Graduate Statistician of the Royal Statistical Society	GradStat
Chartered College of Teaching
Chartered Teacher	CTeach
Alliance of Technology Transfer Professionals
Registered Technology Transfer Professional	RTTP
The Textile Institute
Chartered Textile Technologist	CText*
Chartered Institute of Trade Mark Attorneys
Chartered Trade Mark Attorney	CTMA
Transport Planning Society
Chartered Transport Planning Professional	CTPP
Chartered Institution of Wastes Management	
Chartered Resources and Waste Manager	CRWM
Chartered Waste Manager	MCIWM
The Institute of Revenues Rating and Valuation	
Fellow Members	FIRRV
Honours Members	IRRV (Hons)
Diploma Members	IRRV (Dip)
Technician Members	Tech IRRV
Corporate Members	IRRV

== Membership of the armed forces and civilian services ==
In the armed forces, two or more branches may have officers with the same or similar titles, such as "Captain", which is a rank in the Royal Navy, Army and Royal Marines. To differentiate between the branches, post-nominals such as "RN" are used. However, such post-nominals are not used for the higher positions, since the higher officers are differently-titled in each branch.

This is the last set of post-nominals given by the Ministry of Justice and Debrett's; it is not included by Black's.

Armed forces and civilian services
Royal Navy (Note: "RN" or "RNR" is used for officers with the rank of Commodore or below.) rank or rank abbreviation followed by	RN
Royal Naval Reserve rank or rank abbreviation followed by	RNR
Royal Naval Volunteer Reserve rank or rank abbreviation followed by	RNVR
Royal Fleet Auxiliary rank or rank abbreviation followed by	RFA
Royal Naval Auxiliary Service rank or rank abbreviation followed by	RNXS
Army (Note: In the Army, the initials of the regiment or corps of the officer are used as post-nominals. Until 2015, those above the rank of Lieutenant Colonel had their former regiment or corps preceded by the word 'Late', representing their elevation to the General Staff. This practice was abolished by order of the CGS with effect from 1 Apr 15, but remains in usage amongst those who retired prior to this date) rank or rank abbreviation followed by	HAC, RE, RAC, RA, RMP, R SIGNALS, REME, RLC, AGC, GSC etc.
Royal Air Force (Note: "RAF" or "RAFVR" technically should be used for officers with the rank of Air Chief Marshal and below, though, in practice, it is used for officers with the rank of Wing Commander and below.) rank or rank abbreviation followed by	RAF
Royal Auxiliary Air Force rank or rank abbreviation followed by	RAuxAF
Royal Air Force Volunteer Reserve rank or rank abbreviation followed by	RAFVR
Cadet Forces Commission rank or rank abbreviation followed by	CFC (but not in the RAF Air Cadets who should use RAFAC)
Royal Marines rank or rank abbreviation followed by	RM
Royal Marines Reserve rank or rank abbreviation followed by	RMR
Merchant Navy	MN
Maritime Volunteer Service	MVS
Approved retired officers	(Retd)

== Professional qualifications ==
Music
Associated Board of the Royal Schools of Music
Associate of the Royal Schools of Music	ARSM
Diplomate of the Associated Board of the Royal Schools of Music	DipABRSM
Licentiate of the Royal Schools of Music	LRSM
Fellow of the Royal Schools of Music	FRSM
Certificate of Music Educators	CME ABRSM
Royal Academy of Music
Licentiate of Royal Academy of Music	LRAM
Professional Diploma in Performance/Composition	Prof.Dip
Advanced Diploma in Performance/Opera	AdvDip
London College of Music
Diplomate of London College of Music	DipLCM
Associate of London College of Music	ALCM
Licentiate of London College of Music	LLCM
Fellow of London College of Music	FLCM
Royal College of Music
Associate of Royal College of Music	ARCM
Artist Diploma in Performance/Opera/Composition	ArtDip
Royal College of Music and Royal Academy of Music
Graduate of the Royal Schools of Music	GRSM
Trinity College London
Graduate of Trinity College London	GTCL(Hons)
Associate of Trinity College London	ATCL
Associate of Trinity College London (theory)	AMusTCL
Licentiate of Trinity College London	LTCL
Licentiate of Trinity College London (theory)	LMusTCL
Fellow of Trinity College London	FTCL
Victoria College of Music
Diplomate of Victoria College of Music	DipVCM
Associate of Victoria College of Music	AVCM
Licentiate of Victoria College of Music	LVCM
Fellow of Victoria College of Music	FVCM
Royal College of Organists
Colleague of the Royal College of Organists	CRCO
Associate of the Royal College of Organists	ARCO
Fellow of the Royal College of Organists	FRCO
Diploma in Choral Direction	DipCHD
Licentiate in Teaching of the Royal College of Organists	LTRCO

Dance
Royal Academy of Dance
Fellow of Royal Academy of Dance	FRAD
Licentiate of Royal Academy of Dance	LRAD
Associate of the Royal Academy of Dance	ARAD
Registered Teacher Status with the Royal Academy of Dance	RAD RTS
National Association of Teachers of Dancing
Fellow of National Association of Teachers of Dancing	FNATD
Licentiate of National Association of Teachers of Dancing	LNATD
Associate of the National Association of Teachers of Dancing	ANATD
Student Teacher of the National Association of Teachers of Dancing	SNATD

Accountancy and finance
Association of Chartered Certified Accountants
Certificate in International Financial Reporting	CertIFR
Diploma in International Financial Reporting	DipIFR
Certificate in Digital Innovation for Finance	CertDIF
Licentiate Certificate in International Auditing	CertIA

Law and legal work
Diploma in English Law	Dip Eng Law
Degree of Barrister-at-Law (Northern Ireland)	BL
Diploma in Legal Practice (Scotland)	DipLP
Fellow of the Chartered Institute of Legal Executives	FCILEx
Graduate Member of the Chartered Institute of Legal Executives	GCILEx
Associate Member of the Chartered Institute of Legal Executives	ACILEx
Qualified Professional HR Counsel	QPHR Counsel
Fellow of the Institute of Paralegals	F.Inst.Pa
Full Member (Qualified Paralegal) of the Institute of Paralegals	Q.Inst.Pa
Associate Paralegal (Registered Paralegal) of the Institute of Paralegals	A.Inst.Pa

Social work
Certificate in Social Services (awarded prior to 1975)	CSS
Certificate of Qualification in Social Work (awarded from 1975 to 1991)	CQSW
Diploma in Social Work (awarded from 1991 to 2009)	DipSW
Bachelor of Social Work	BA (Hons) SW, BSc (Hons) SW, BSW (Hons), MA (Hons) SW, MSc (Hons) SW
Master of Social Work	MSc SW, MA SW
State Registered Social Worker	RSW
Qualified Social Worker	QSW
Approved Mental Health Professional	AMHP
Best Interest Assessor	BIA
Practice Educator	PE
Social Supervisor (forensic social worker)	SSup

Logistics and transport
Logistician	FSCM, CSCM, ESCM, PSCM, ASCM, MSCM, AFSCM, LSCM. FCILT, CMILT, MILT, CPL, CTP, CML, PLS, CTL, DLP, PLog, EJLog, ESLog, EMLog, JrLog, Log, SrLog

Architecture
Architecture	RIBA, RIAS, RIAI, RSAW
Conservation Architecture	CA & SCA, AABC & CAABC

Medicine and related areas
Surgery	MRCS, FRCS, MS, MCh, etc.
Physicians	MRCP, FRCP, MRCPCH, FRCPCH, MRCPath (or similar membership and fellowships of Royal Colleges or Faculties)
Pathologists	FRCPath
Pharmaceutical Physicians	MFPM, FFPM
Dietitians	RD
Sport and exercise medicine physicians	MFSEM(UK), FFSEM(UK), DipMSK (FSEM), DipTC (FSEM), DipExMed (FSEM), DFSEM(UK),
Psychiatrists	MRCPsych, FRCPsych
Obstetricians and Gynaecologists	MRCOG, FRCOG
Emergency physicians	MRCEM, FRCEM
Emergency Medical Technician	EMT-R (Must be on the Managed Voluntary Register at the U.K Registry of Emergency Medical Technicians(UKREMT))
Critical Care Physicians	FFICM
Anaesthetists	MRCA, FRCA, FFPMRCA
General Practitioners	MRCGP, FRCGP,
Dispensing Opticians	FADO, FBDO
Optometrists	FCOptom, MCOptom
Paramedics	GASI & FASI (Historic qualifcations), MCPara, FCPara
Pre-hospital care providers	DipIMC / DIMC (RCSEd), FIMC (RCSEd), DipRTM (RCSEd), DMCC, DipROM (RCSEd), DipPUC (CoP), DUMC (RCSEd), FAWM,
Podiatric Medicine/Podiatric Surgery	BSc (Hons), DPodM, MRCPod, FCPM, FRCPodS, FFPM RCPS (Glasg)
Physiotherapy	DPT, BSc Phys (Hons), MCSP, FCSP, DipMSK (FSEM)
Occupational therapy	MRCOT, FRCOT, SROT, etc.
Operating Department Practitioner	ODP, BSc, DipHE etc.
Radiographer	MSCR, FSCR, etc.
Registered Nurse	RGN, RNA, RNC, RNMH, RNLD, BSc, BNurs, MSc, MNurSci, DNP etc.
Registered Veterinary Nurses	RVN
Speech & Language Therapist	BSc, MSc, MRCSLT, Cert.MRCSLT
Veterinary surgeons	BVSc, BVetMed, VetMB, BVM&S, BVMS, MRCVS, FRCVS
Wilderness medicine	FAWM, MFAWM, DipMtnMed, DiMM, DiDMM, WP-C, FRRHHEd (RCSEd),

Pharmacy
Postgraduate diploma	PgDipClinPharm, PgDipCommPharm, PgDipGPP PgDipGenPharmPrac
Member of the Royal Pharmaceutical Society	MRPharmS
Scientist Member of the Royal Pharmaceutical Society	SRPharmS
Fellow of the Royal Pharmaceutical Society	FRPharmS
Member of the Faculty of the Royal Pharmaceutical Society	MFRPSI, MFRPSII
Fellow of the Faculty of the Royal Pharmaceutical Society	FFRPS
Certified Pharmacy Technician	CPhT, Reg Pharm Tech
Pharmacy Technicians (Upon full membership of APTUK)	MAPharmT
Fellow of the Veterinary Pharmacy Association	FVPA
Member of the Veterinary Pharmacy Association	MVPA

Alternative medicine
Medical homeopaths	LFHOM, MFHOM, FFHOM
Osteopaths	MOst

Teaching
Certificate in Education	Cert. Ed.	
Chartered Teacher	CTeach	
Postgraduate Certificate in Academic Practice	PGCAP	
Postgraduate Certificate in Higher Education	PGCHE	
Postgraduate Certificate in Education	PGCE	
Postgraduate Diploma Academic Practice	PGDAP	
Postgraduate Diploma in Education	PGDipEd	
Professional Graduate Diploma in Education	PGDE	
National Professional Qualification for Headship	NPQH	
National Professional Qualification for Senior Leadership	NPQSL	
National Professional Qualification for Middle Leadership	NPQML	
National Professional Qualification for Leading Teaching	NPQLT	
Qualified Teacher Status	QTS, QTLS	
College of Teachers (pre-2017): holders are still entitled to use the post-nominal letters under the royal charter of the Chartered College of Teaching.		DFCOT, FCOT (or FCP), AdDipCOT, LCOT (or LCP), DipCOT, ACOT (or ACP), AdCertCOT, DipASE

Scientific professional registers
Chartered Scientist	CSci
Chartered Biologist	CBiol
Chartered Chemist	CChem
Chartered Physicist	CPhys
Chartered Psychologist	CPsychol
Chartered Science Teacher	CSciTeach
Registered Scientist	RSci
Registered Science Technician	RSciTech
Registered Animal Scientist	RAnimSci

Land-based professionals
Royal Forestry Society – Master in Arboriculture	MArb (RFS)
Royal Horticultural Society – Master of Horticulture	MHort (RHS)

Engineering professional registers
Chartered Engineer	CEng
Incorporated Engineer	IEng
Engineering Technician	EngTech
ICT Technician	RITTech
Diploma in Engineering Management (ASEE)	DEM

Marine operations and technical and scientific professional registers
Master Unlimited/Foreign Going/Class 1 Certificate of Competency	Master Mariner, MM
Chartered Marine Engineer	CMarEng
Chartered Marine Scientist	CMarSci
Chartered Marine Technologist	CMarTech
Incorporated Marine Engineer	IMarEng
Marine Engineering Technician	MarEngTech

Nursing qualifications
Pre-2007: Although technically out of date, some of these titles are still in common usage, particularly with nurses registered with the NMC's precedent body.	RGN SRN RMN RSCN SEN SEN(M) EN EN(M) RNMH RN
Nursing and midwifery qualifications as of 2007: (Note: The title of "1st Level Registered Nurse" is comparable to the old titles of RGN, RMN etc. The title of "2nd Level Registered Nurse" refers to those previously called Enrolled Nurses. The post-nominal letters for 1st Level Registered Nurses can be used interchangeably but not together i.e. either Your Name, RN1 or Your Name, RNA not Your Name, RN1, RNA)	RM RN1/RNA RN2 RN3/RNMH RN4 RN5/RNLD RN6 RN8/RNC RN7 RN9 RHV RSN ROH RFHN (Scotland only) (Nursing Associate – England only) – NAR
Nurse recorded qualifications: The nurse must be registered in one of the above categories to be eligible to study for and use these post-nominal letters (exc NAR)	SPAN SPMH SPCN SPLD SPHP SCHM SCLD SPCC SPDN V100 V200 V300 LPE

Management
Institute of Management Specialists
Companion of the Institute of Management Specialists	Comp.I.M.S.
Fellow of the Institute of Management Specialists	F.I.M.S.
Member of the Institute of Management Specialists	M.I.M.S.
Associate Member of the Institute of Management Specialists	A.M.I.M.S.
Student Member of the Institute of Management Specialists	Stud.I.M.S.

Rescue
Certificate in Specialist Rescue	CertSR
Diploma in Specialist Rescue	DipSR

== Other awards ==
Awards other than Crown Honours are not normally listed except in the context of events related to the awarding body

British Red Cross Society Awards & Honours
Badge of Honour (No Category – abbreviation of categories below – Common Usage)	BH
Badge of Honour for Devoted Service – Uncommon Usage	BH(D)
Badge of Honour for Distinguished Service – Uncommon Usage	BH(DS)
Badge of Honour for Outstanding Service – Uncommon Usage	BH(OS)

== Youth organisations ==
Member of the UK Youth Parliament	MYP
Deputy Member of the UK Youth Parliament	DMYP
Member of the Scottish Youth Parliament	MSYP
Welsh Youth Parliament Member	WYPM/ASIC

== See also ==
- Lists of post-nominal letters
