= Manoj =

Manoj is a male given name of Indian origin. Notable people called Manoj include:

== Business ==
- Manoj Badale (born 1967), Indian businessman
- Manoj Bhargava (born 1953), Indian-American entrepreneur and philanthropist

== Education ==
- Manoj Chitnavis, British teacher and chemist
- Manoj Datta, Indian professor and civil engineer
- Manoj Pant, Indian professor and international trade expert

== Film and television ==
- Manoj (film editor), editor of films such as Ivide
- Manoj Bajpayee (born 1969), also credited as Manoj Bajpai, Indian film actor, predominantly in Bollywood and Telugu films
- Manoj Bharathiraja (1976–2025), Tamil film actor
- Manoj K. Jayan (born 1966), Indian actor in Malayalam, Tamil, and Telugu films
- Manoj Joshi (actor) (born 1965), Indian stage, film and television actor
- Manoj Kumar (1937–2025), Indian actor and director in Bollywood films
- Manoj Kumar (Tamil director) (born 1960), who has directed Tamil, Telugu and Kannada language films
- Manoj Mitra (1938–2024), Bengali Indian theatre, film and television actor, director and playwright
- Manoj Pahwa (born 1963), Indian film and television actor
- Manoj Paramahamsa, Indian cinematographer, primarily working in Tamil cinema
- Manoj Punj (1970–2006), Punjabi film director
- Manoj Punjabi (born 1972), Indian-Indonesian film and television producer
- Manoj Sharma (born 1973), Indian director, screenwriter, and editor in primarily Hindi and Bhojpuri films
- M. Night Shyamalan (Manoj Nelliyattu Shyamalan, born 1970), Indian-American filmmaker
- Manoj Sood (born 1962), Canadian film and television actor
- Manoj Tyagi (born 1974), Indian screenwriter and film director in Hindi cinema

== Music ==
- Manoj George, composer and violinist in the Malayalam and Kannada film industries
- Manoj–Gyan, Indian music director duo for Hindi and Tamil language films
- Manoj Tiwari (Delhi politician) (born 1971), singer, actor, television presenter and music director from Bihar, India

== Politics ==
- Manoj Chakraborty, West Bengal politician
- Manoj Juneja (born 1960), Indian United Nations official
- Manoj Kumar (Delhi politician)
- Manoj Kumar (Jharkhand politician) (born 1964), Lok Sabha member representing the Palamau Constituency of Jharkhand
- Manoj Pradhan, Indian politician from the Bharatiya Janata Party
- Manoj Rajoria (born 1969), Indian politician
- Manoj Seeburn, Mauritian politician
- Manoj Kumar Singh, Bihar politician
- Manoj Sinha (born 1959), politician representing Ghazipur Lok Sabha constituency

== Sports and games ==
- Manoj Baishya (born 1980), Nepalese cricketer
- Manoj Bhagawati, Indian cricketer
- Manoj Cheruparambil (born 1979), Indian-born Hong Kong cricketer
- Manoj David (born 1975), Sri Lankan cricketer
- Manoj Hemaratne (born 1969), Sri Lankan cricketer
- Manoj Joglekar (born 1973), Indian cricketer
- Manoj Katuwal (born 1985), Nepalese cricketer
- Manoj Kumar (boxer) (born 1986), Indian welterweight boxer
- Manoj Kumar (chess player) (born 1977), Fijian chess champion
- Manoj Parmar (born 1967), Indian cricketer
- Manoj Prabhakar (born 1963), Indian cricketer
- Manoj Rodrigo (born 1983), Sri Lankan cricketer
- Manoj Tiwary (cricketer) (born 1985), Indian cricketer

== Writing ==
- Manoj Das (1934–2021), Indian writer in Oriya and English
- Manoj Gupta (born 1967), Indian publisher and editor
- Manoj Joshi (journalist), Indian journalist and author
- Manoj Khanderia (1943–2003), poet and ghazalkaar of Gujarati Literature
- Manoj Kuroor (born 1971), Malayalam poet and lyricist

== Other people ==
- Manoj Kumar Mishra (born 1952), Indian academic and researcher
- Manoj Pande (civil servant), Indian civil servant (IRPS) and Member Staff of Railway Board
- Manoj Pande (general), Indian Army general
- Manoj Kumar Pandey (1975–1999), Indian Army officer, recipient of the Param Vir Chakra

== Use other than as a given name ==
- K. S. Manoj (born 1965), Kerala politician representing Alapuzha Lok Sabha constituency
- Maalavika Manoj (born 1993), independent musician and songwriter based in Chennai, Tamil Nadu
- Manchu Manoj (born 1983), Indian film actor
- P. H. Manoj Pandian (born 1971), politician and former Member of the Legislative Assembly
