= Institute of Science and Technology =

There are various bodies with this name, including

- Institute of Science and Technology, Austria
- Institute of Science and Technology, Bangladesh
- Institute of Science and Technology, Tribhuvan University
- Institute of Science and Technology, UK
- Institute of Science and Technology, West Bengal
- Daegu Gyeongbuk Institute of Science and Technology, South Korea
- Gwangju Institute of Science and Technology, South Korea
- Korea Advanced Institute of Science and Technology, South Korea
- Shaheed Zulfikar Ali Bhutto Institute of Science and Technology, Pakistan
- Korea Institute of Ocean Science ＆ Technology (ko), South Korea
- Ulsan National Institute of Science and Technology, South Korea
