= John Holman (chemist) =

English chemist and academic

Sir John Holman FRSC CChem
- Born: John Stranger Holman; 16 September 1946 (age 79); Bath, Somerset, England
- Education: Royal Grammar School, Guildford
- Alma mater: University of Cambridge (MA)
- Awards: Lord Lewis Prize (2014); Kavli Education Medal (2014)
- Scientific career
- Fields: Science education; Chemistry education; Science policy; Careers guidance policy
- Institutions: University of York; Gatsby Foundation
- Holman's voice recorded December 2014
- Website: www.york.ac.uk/chemistry/staff/academic/emeritus/jholman

Sir John Stranger Holman FRSC CChem (born 16 September 1946) is an English chemist and academic. He is emeritus professor of chemistry at the University of York, senior advisor in education at the Gatsby Foundation, founding director of the National STEM Learning Centre, Chair of the Bridge Group, past president of the Royal Society of Chemistry (RSC), and of The Association for Science Education (ASE).

== Education ==
Holman was educated at the Royal Grammar School, Guildford, and Gonville and Caius College, Cambridge, where he was awarded a Bachelor of Arts degree with Honours in 1967.

== Career ==
Holman served as a Headteacher of Watford Grammar School for Boys between 1994 and 2000, and was the British government's National STEM Director from 2006 to 2010 (STEM referring to the academic disciplines of Science, technology, engineering, and mathematics). He served as president of the Royal Society of Chemistry from 2016 to 2018, and was a trustee of the Natural History Museum (2011–2019). He was the founding director of Salters' Advanced Chemistry programme, and is the author of numerous chemistry textbooks.

Holman is author of the Good Career Guidance report for the Gatsby Foundation, which is the basis for the English government's national strategy for career guidance in schools: Careers strategy: making the most of everyone's skills and talents. He is independent strategic adviser on careers guidance to ministers in the Department for Education. (2021 - ) Holman also authored the Good Practical Science report and was the lead author of Improving Secondary Science guidance report for the Educational Environment Foundation (2018). He is a member of the Wolfson Foundation's School Panel. (2020)

=== Awards and honours ===
Holman was Knighted in the 2010 New Year Honours. In 2014 the Royal Society of Chemistry awarded him the Lord Lewis Prize "in recognition of his extensive influence over chemistry education policy". Holman was named in 2014 by the Science Council as one of the UK's 100 leading practising scientists, and was the 2014 recipient of the Royal Society's biennial Kavli Education Medal, "in recognition of his significant impact on science education within the UK". He was elected President of the Yorkshire Philosophical Society in 2018.
