= Sarah Pitt (microbiologist) =

Microbiologist

Dr Sarah Jane Pitt is a microbiologist at the University of Brighton and President of the Institute of Biomedical Science (IBMS). She has published three books on biomedical science, parasitology, and clinical microbiology with an emphasis on laboratory practice. She is the IBMS's chief examiner in virology.

On the 2nd of January 2025, Dr Pitt was announced as the President Elect of the IBMS, to support existing IBMS President Joanna Andrew throughout 2025 and step into the President role in 2026.

== Selected publications ==
- Introduction to Biomedical Science in Clinical and Professional Practice (with Jim Cunningham)
- Parasitology: An Integrated Approach (with Alan Gunn)
- Clinical Microbiology for Diagnostic and Laboratory Scientists
