= Registered Science Technician =

UK professional qualification

Registered Science Technician (RSciTech) is a professional qualification in the United Kingdom for science technicians. It was introduced in 2011 alongside Registered Scientist as an extension to the UK Science Council's existing professional register for Chartered Scientists. the Registered Science Technician (RSciTech) was developed with the support of the Gatsby Charitable Foundation, with the aim of increasing the professionalism and recognition of those working in technical roles in science. Holders of this qualification can use the post-nominal letters RSciTech. Registration as RSciTech has been encouraged by institutions such as Imperial College London, and the UK Government's Science manufacturing technician and Laboratory technician apprenticeship standards are designed to lead to registration as an RSciTech.

== Licensed Bodies ==
The Science Council licences its member bodies to award professional statuses. The professional bodies listed below are those licensed to award Registered Science Technician as of May 2017:

- Association for Science Education
- British Psychological Society
- Institute of Animal Technology
- Institute of Biomedical Science
- Institute of Food Science & Technology
- Institute of Materials, Minerals and Mining
- Institute of Physics
- Institute of Science and Technology
- Institute of Physics and Engineering in Medicine
- Institution of Chemical Engineers
- Institute of Water
- Royal Society of Biology
- Royal Society of Chemistry
