= Registered Scientist =

Registered Scientist (RSci) is a professional qualification in the United Kingdom that was introduced in 2012 as an extension to the Science Council's existing professional registers. This register extends the framework to allow professional recognition for higher technical roles. Holders of this qualification can use the post-nominal letters RSci. The Registered Scientist and Registered Science Technician (RSciTech), which was introduced at the same time, were developed with the support of the Gatsby Charitable Foundation.

The UK Government stated in their Plan for Growth that this type of accreditation allows employers to trust the abilities of graduates. This is due to the requirement of applicants to provide evidence that they meet specific competencies in their day to day role.

== Licensed bodies ==
The professional bodies listed below are licensed to award the Registered Scientist title.

- Association for Science Education
- Institute of Biomedical Science
- Institute of Food Science and Technology
- Institute of Physics and Engineering in Medicine
- Institute of Science and Technology
- Institute of Water
- Institution of Chemical Engineers
- Royal Society of Chemistry
- Royal Society of Biology
