= Chartered Construction Manager =

UK professional designation

A Chartered Construction Manager is a professional designation in the United Kingdom. The Construction Manager title was awarded 'Chartered' status by the Privy Council and Her Majesty in October 2013.

Full corporate members (MCIOBs) and fellows (FCIOBs) of the Chartered Institute of Building (CIOB) have permission to use the title 'Chartered Construction Manager'. Existing CIOB Members with the designation 'Chartered Builder' were offered the choice to also register to use the designation of 'Chartered Construction Manager' before the end of December 2014. Full corporate members that registered at this time are permitted to use both designations, but not at the same time.

An alternative to the designation of 'Chartered Builder' used by CIOB members and fellows since the 1980s, the title Chartered Construction Manager reflects the breadth and complexity of management careers within the built environment sector.

In 2010 the Chartered Institute of Building set out a new broader definition for the designation of 'Chartered Construction Manager' construction management definition.
