= Chartered status =

Chartered status may refer to:

- Award of Chartered (Professional) status in a particular profession, commonly issued by British and Commonwealth Professional Societies worldwide.
- The gaining of a Royal Charter
