= Alastair Charles Lewis =

Professor of Atmospheric Chemistry at the University of York

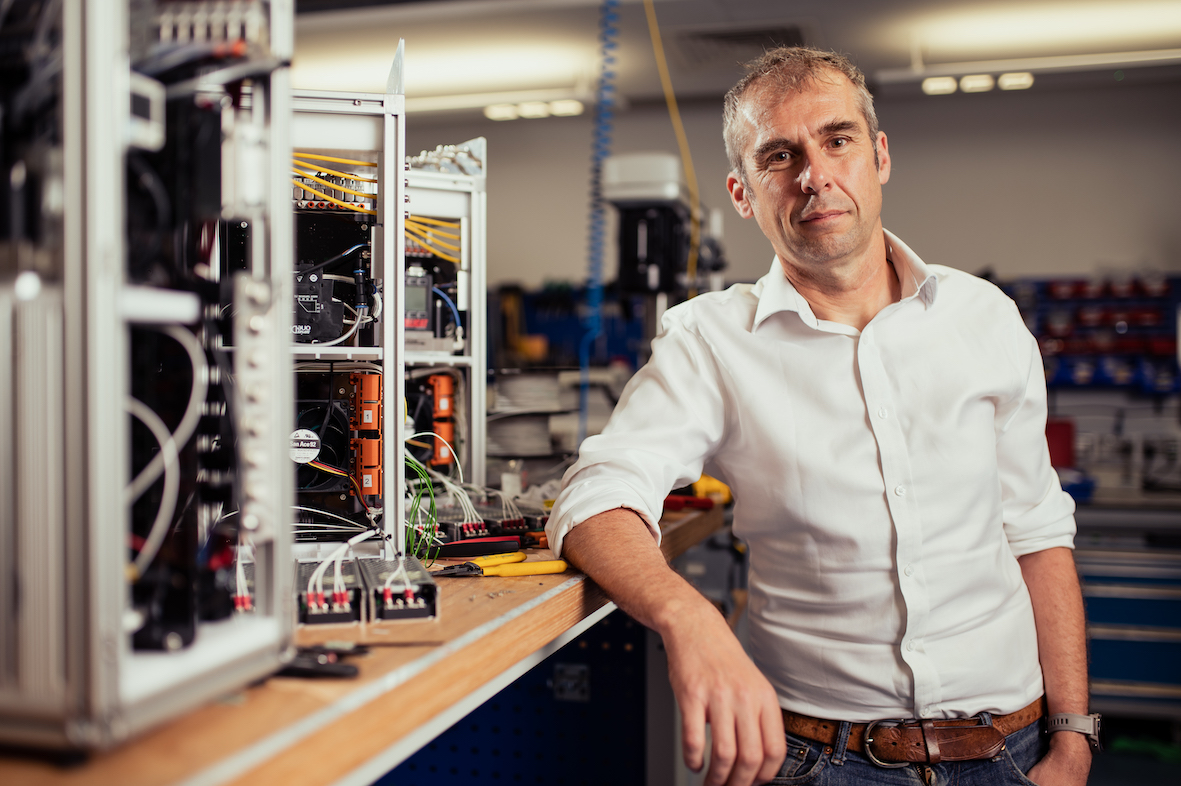
- Born: Chatham
- Education: University of Leeds BSc (Hons), PhD
- Awards: Lord Lewis Prize (2022); John Jeyes Award (2012); SAC Silver Medal (2007); Philip Leverhulme Prize (2005); Desty Memorial Prize (2001)
- Scientific career
- Fields: Atmospheric chemistry, Analytical science and technology, Environmental policy
- Thesis: Polycyclic aromatic compounds in urban air (1995)
- Doctoral advisor: Mike Pilling, Keith Bartle
- Website: Official website

Alastair Charles Lewis (Ally Lewis) is a professor of Atmospheric chemistry at the University of York and the National Centre for Atmospheric Science (NCAS). He has been Chair of the UK Government's independent science advisory body on air pollution, the Defra Air Quality Expert Group, since 2019.

Lewis became Chair of the Department for Transport Science Advisory Council in 2021. He is currently a member of the Environmental Sustainability Panel of the UK Civil Aviation Authority. He holds a Royal Society Industry Fellowship (2024–2028) working with the fine chemicals company Givaudan SA on new approaches to solvent minimisation. He is Chair of the NERC Science and Innovation Advisory Committee (SIAC) for the period 2026 - 2029.

== Education ==
Lewis attended Sir Joseph Williamson's Mathematical School and then studied chemistry at the University of Leeds followed by a PhD in atmospheric and analytical chemistry supervised by Mike Pilling and Keith Bartle, awarded in 1995.

== Research and career ==
He is known for his development of analytical chemistry methods that are applied to air pollution monitoring and atmospheric chemistry research, and particularly the use of gas chromatography to measure volatile organic compounds (VOCs) and the composition of liquid fuels such as gasoline and diesel. He was the first person to use comprehensive gas chromatography (GCxGC) to establish the complexity of volatile organic compounds found in urban air, completed while on a research sabbatical at RMIT University, Australia. He held a lecturer position at the University of Leeds, as a joint appointment between the Schools of Chemistry and Earth & Environment before later moving to the Department of Chemistry at University of York in 2003. He currently works in the Wolfson Atmospheric Chemistry Laboratories at York.

Between 2007 and 2012 Lewis worked part-time for the Natural Environment Research Council as their Theme Leader for research programmes in new technologies. Between 2008 and 2022 he was a science director at the National Centre for Atmospheric Science, with specific responsibility for air pollution and atmospheric composition research.

Lewis has published a number of commentary articles on air pollution science and policy in the UK, US and China. He has also made a number of appearances on TV and radio discussing vehicle emissions and indoor air pollution. He has been widely quoted as being sceptical about the value of air pollution removal technologies such as smog towers and roadside filter systems, and the wider sustainability of air filtration. He has raised potential problems associated with hydrogen for home heating, highlighting the negative impacts of emissions of NOx and the concentration of those emissions in poorer neighbourhoods. With Prof. Chris Whitty and Dr Deborah Jenkins he published a future research needs strategy on Indoor Air Quality. A 2024 paper in Science set out a framework for combining science, policy and law for air quality management.

He has collaborated with Peter Edwards at York to evaluate low cost air pollution sensor technologies and with David Carslaw on diesel engine NOx emissions. Although primarily a chemist, he was named in a 2015 list of the World's 100 most influential analytical scientists. His research career was documented by the Science History Institute in 2011, part of series of interviews with atmospheric scientists.

== Awards and honours ==
Lewis was awarded the Desty Memorial Prize in separation science at the Royal Institution in 2001, a Philip Leverhulme Prize in 'Earth Ocean and Atmospheric Sciences' in 2004, the SAC Silver Medal in 2007 from the Royal Society of Chemistry, and the John Jeyes Award for Environment, Energy and Sustainability in 2012. He was awarded the 2022 Lord Lewis prize for significant contributions to the development of science policy.
