= Lord Lewis Prize =

The Lord Lewis Prize is awarded by the Royal Society of Chemistry for distinctive and distinguished chemical or scientific achievements together with significant contributions to the development of science policy. The recipient receives a medal, a certificate and a prize of £5,000.

The Lord Lewis Prize is awarded every two years to mark the substantial contributions that Professor Lord Lewis made to chemistry and science policy. The inaugural Lord Lewis Prize was awarded to Lord May of Oxford, former president of the Royal Society and chief scientific advisor to the UK Government, in 2008.

== Recipients ==
Source: Royal Society of Chemistry

- 2008 – Lord Robert May
- 2010 – Sir John Cadogan
- 2012 – Sir David King
- 2014 – Sir John Holman
- 2016 – Sir Martyn Poliakoff
- 2018 – Luis Oro University of Zaragoza, CSIC
- 2020 – Vernon C. Gibson
- 2022 – Alastair Charles Lewis

== See also ==
- List of chemistry awards
