= Institute of Biomedical Science =

UK professional body

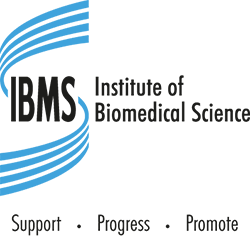
- Formation: 1912
- Founder: Albert Norman
- Type: Professional body
- Headquarters: Farringdon, London
- President: Joanna Andrew
- Website: https://www.ibms.org/home/
- Formerly called: Pathological and Bacteriological Laboratory Assistants’ Association (PBLAA)

The Institute of Biomedical Science (IBMS) is the professional body for biomedical scientists in the United Kingdom.

== History ==
The Institute of Biomedical Science was founded in 1912 as the Pathological and Bacteriological Laboratory Assistants' Association (PBLAA). In 1942 it became the Institute of Medical Laboratory Technology (IMLT), and changed to its current name (IBMS) in 1994.

== Membership ==
IBMS represents approximately 20,000 members, employed mainly in the National Health Service, the UK Health Security Agency, and private healthcare laboratories. Other members also work in veterinary laboratories, the National Blood Authority, Health Protection Agency, Medical Research Council, and Department for Environment, Food and Rural Affairs, as well as related commercial fields and in teaching.

== Aims ==
The institute aims to promote and develop biomedical science and its practitioners.

== Roles ==
The IBMS carries out a range of functions including:

- Setting standards of practice to protect patients
- Representing the interests of biomedical science to UK government, media and universities
- Advising UK government departments and national organisations on all matters relating to biomedical science
- Promoting public awareness of biomedical science
- Awarding through the Science Council, Registered Science Technician (RSciTech), Registered Scientist (RSci) and Chartered Scientist (CSci) status
- Assessing competence for biomedical scientists to practise
- Assessing qualifications for registration with the Health and Care Professions Council (HCPC)
- Accrediting university degrees (for a list of accredited degree courses, visit the IBMS website)
- Updating and educating members through digital communications, published journals, scientific meetings and professional events
- Organising a continuing professional development scheme aligned to HCPC specifications
- Publishing scientific and professional publications
- Providing legal and technical help for members
- Funding of research into biomedical science
- Providing assessors for recruiting senior staff to laboratories

The IBMS organises a diverse range of scientific and professional events including its biennial biomedical science Congress – the largest event of its kind in Europe.

=== Publications ===
The IBMS publishes two periodicals:

The gold open accessed British Journal of Biomedical Science is a peer-review journal registered with Pub Med, that carries scientific papers (as full original articles and short reports), case reports, and invited reviews. Its ISI impact factor in the summer of 2022 is 2.43. The median time to first decision after refereeing is two weeks. There are no page charges (except colour figures). The acceptance rate is in the region of 13%.

The monthly The Biomedical Scientist has news, articles, opinions, reports, diaries of events and job advertisements which is produced by Redactive publications.

The IBMS also publishes laboratory and professional guidelines, and careers information.

=== Biomedical Scientist registration ===
Registration with the HCPC is a legal requirement for Biomedical Scientists working in the UK. The IBMS assesses and accredits undergraduate or higher-level courses and qualifications for candidates seeking registration. In recognition of attaining this first level of professional competence, the institute also awards its own Certificate of Competence in Biomedical Science, which forms an important part of an individual's professional portfolio. The IBMS works with the HCPC to approve laboratories for registration training.

=== Chartered Scientist ===
The Institute of Biomedical Science has been granted a licence by The Science Council to award the designation Chartered Scientist to qualifying IBMS members. The designation Chartered Scientist is a mark of excellence awarded to scientists practising at their full professional level and who stay up-to-date in their scientific field. The designation was conferred to The Science Council by royal charter in October 2003 and adds science to the now familiar list of chartered professions such as biologist, accountant or surveyor. The IBMS is also licensed to award the designations Registered Scientist and Registered Science Technician.

== Devolution and regions ==
A network of IBMS regions and branches in the United Kingdom, Ireland, Hong Kong, Cyprus and Gibraltar provides opportunities for members to participate locally in IBMS affairs. The 11 IBMS regions support local biomedical scientists, promote the profession, develop local networks and organise scientific and social meetings.
