= Manoj Rodrigo =

Sri Lankan cricketer (born 1983)

Manoj Rodrigo (born Warnakulasooriya Edrian Manoj Srikantha Rodrigo on 1 November 1983) was a Sri Lankan cricketer. He was a right-handed batsman and right-arm off-break bowler who played for Sri Lanka Air Force Sports Club. He was born in Chilaw.

Rodrigo, who appeared in the Under-23s team between 2003 and 2004, made a single first-class appearance, in the 2003–04 season, against Sinhalese Sports Club. From the lower-middle order, he scored 8 runs in the first innings in which he batted, and a golden duck in the second.

He bowled 12 overs in the match, conceding 56 runs. He played in Division 2 of the Italian Cricket League in the 2006–07 season for Padova Cricket Club, and in Division 1 from 2008 to 2019 for Gallicano Cricket Club, Bologna Cricket Club, and Pianoro Cricket Club. He played 60 limited-overs (50-over) matches, scoring 2,050 runs, including eight centuries and 18 half-centuries, and taking 50 wickets. He has completed Level 2 coaching certification and runs a cricket academy for children in Padova, Italy. He is a coach and a player.
