= Institute of Science and Technology, UK =

British professional organisation

Institute of Science and Technology
- Abbreviation: IST
- Formation: 1948 (2007)
- Legal status: professional organization
- Purpose: support of management and technical staff in science, technology, engineering, arts, meadia and IT-related employment
- Location: The Balance, 2 Pinfold St Sheffield, S1 2GU.
- Region served: UK
- Affiliations: Science Council
- Website: istonline.org.uk

The Institute of Science and Technology is a UK-based professional organization which is a member of the Science Council and thereby authorized to award the designation Registered Science Technician (RSciTech), Registered Scientist (RSci) and Chartered Scientist (CSci).

== History ==
It was formed in 1948 as the Science Technology Association, became the Institute of Science Technology (IST)in 1954 and took its present name in 2007. The IST was formed specifically for science laboratory technicians, and continues to provide specialist qualifications in this area, up to Higher Diploma but has expanded the membership in line with developments in roles in science and technology.

== Notable members ==
The Chairman, Terry Croft, MBE has been recognised in 2014 as one of the 100 UK Leading Practising Scientists.

The President, Dr Helen Sharman, OBE is a chemist who became the first British astronaut and the first woman to visit the Mir space station in 1991. Helen joined the Institute of Science and Technology in 2015 and since has been bringing a wealth of knowledge and experience to the IST team and to the technical community at large.
