= Institute of Food Science and Technology =

Independent qualifying body for food professionals based in the UK

- Formation: 1964; 62 years ago
- Location: London, United Kingdom
- President: Christopher Gilbert-Wood
- Website: ifst.org

The Institute of Food Science & Technology (IFST) is an independent qualifying body for food professionals based in the UK that is concerned with all aspects of food science and technology.

The IFST was established to advance food science and technology, to advance education in the area and to make progress in applying principles of food science for the benefit, safety and health of the public. It serves the public by taking into account the many elements that are important for the efficient and responsible supply, manufacture and distribution of safe, wholesome, nutritious, and affordable foods with due regard for the environment, animal welfare and the rights of consumers.

== History ==
=== Origins ===
In the 1950s, food science and technology became a subject in its own right. The UK National College of Food Technology was established in 1955 and food science degree courses began to be taught in four UK universities and one polytechnic. By the 1960s, food science and technology graduates and other scientists who were working with food felt the need for an institution that recognised the new discipline of food science and technology. The IFST was formed in 1964 to cater for this new breed of scientists and work began rapidly on creating and developing the new organisation. By 1968, the Institute became an incorporated body, with a Memorandum and Articles of Association and Bye-Laws.

=== Development ===
During the 1970s, IFST further development its range of professional activities. In 1980, IFST became a full member of the Council of Science and Technology Institutes (the predecessor to the Science Council). In the following decade, IFST focused on its public benefit role, in particular, the initiative to form the European Federation of Food Science and Technology (EFFoST), and the further development of its scientific publications.

=== Into the 21st century ===
In November 2007, the Charity Commission granted charitable status to the IFST company. IFST is a member-based organisation governed by a Board of Trustees, who are elected by the members. The Board is assisted by a Finance Committee and a small Executive Team. There are six standing committees, each of which deals with a particular aspect of the Institute and advises the Board on relevant topics. These committees are made up of IFST members and chaired by a member of the Board, all volunteer based. The IFST member base represents the largest food science and technology community in Europe. IFST is the only qualifying body in the UK dedicated to food science and technology.

== IFST's activities ==
The IFST aims to serve the public with competence and integrity. The IFST lists its aims as:

1. Benefiting the public supply of safe, wholesome, nutritious, tasty and attractive food through the application of sound science and technology;
2. Improving public knowledge and awareness of important issues relating to the supply, production, safety and quality of food;
3. Developing and communicating the knowledge underlying food science and technology, and furthering the education of food scientists and technologists;
4. Safeguarding the public by defining, promoting and upholding professional standards of competence, integrity and ethical behaviour; and
5. Maintaining these standards by encouraging members to continue their professional education and development throughout their careers.

As an independent body, the IFST claims it can take an independent and objective evidence-based position on all matters relevant to food science, food technology and food professionalism.

The IFST retains strong links with the US-based Institute of Food Technologists (IFT) and with the International Union of Food Science and Technology (IUFoST).

=== Events ===
IFST hold a number of regional and national events in the UK, some of which are organised by IFST's regional branches or professional groups. The majority of these events are open to the public. IFST hold a number of conferences including the IFST Annual Spring Conference and AGM, The Changing Face of Auditing (organised by the IFST Western branch), and the IFST Professional Food Sensory Group (PFSG) Annual Conference. They also organise lectures, discussions, and various other events. On a regional level, many branches organise food-themed outings to breweries, factories, orchards and related places.

=== Careers ===
IFST does a great deal to promote careers within food science and technology to young people. IFST, in partnership with the Food and Drink Federation (FDF) and The National Skills Academy for Food and Drink, have launched Taste Success, a campaign dedicated to demonstrating the vast opportunities within food science and technology, particularly the food and drink manufacturing sector.

IFST's Learning Zone has a great deal of information about careers in food science and technology including a list of UK universities offering food science and technology related courses (from foundation level to postgraduate) and testimonials from IFST members about their careers. IFST have also designed a Graduate Guide to Food Science and Technology which is available in print or online.

In November 2011, IFST, in partnership with Camden BRI, held the first of their annual Student Career LaunchPad event, supporting university students from across the UK. The event included a series of sessions aimed to enhance the students' understanding of the food science industry, opportunities to network with food professionals and a student competition sponsored by Heinz. IFST offers a number of prizes and awards for students studying food science and technology.

=== Prizes and awards ===
IFST offers a great deal of prizes and awards:

- North of England Young Scientist Competition – Held by the IFST North of England for university students studying in the North of England
- South Eastern Young Scientist Competition – Held by the IFST South Eastern branch for university students studying in the South East
- IFST Undergraduate Student Competition – Held by the IFST Northern Ireland branch for students studying in NI
- Professional Food Sensory Group (PFSG) Travel Bursary – The PFSG funds up to £500 towards travel for a student to attend any conference/meeting relating to food and consumer sensory science
- Parliamentary Office of Science and Technology (POST) Fellowship – A three-month Fellowship at POST for a PhD student working in a food related area
- The John Karkalas Award – Covers costs for young food scientists, technologists and engineers studying in Scotland to attend and participate in the IFST Scottish Branch Spring Symposium
- The Ralph Blanchfield Award – Covers costs for undergraduate food scientists, technologists and engineers to attend and participate in the IFST Annual Spring Conference
- Student Photographic Competition – Held by the IFST Western branch, photographic competition for students studying at universities in South Wales and the West of England

=== Accreditation schemes ===
The Safe and Local Supplier Approval (SALSA) is a food safety certification scheme which assists small food and drink businesses in supplying their products to national and regional buyers. IFST operate the scheme throughout the UK. SALSA have also developed a HACCP training initiative designed to support small and micro businesses. There are two courses: Level 1 – HACCP awareness and Level 2 – HACCP understanding. Successful participants are awarded a nationally recognised food industry qualification accredited by IFST.

Through the Professional Food Sensory Group (PFSG), IFST offers accreditation of sensory training courses at both the Foundation and Intermediate level for any organisation providing sensory training/education.

IFST have developed a Register of Professional Food Auditors and Mentors (RPFAM), an independent measure of the skills, experience, and knowledge of professionals offering audit and consultancy services to food companies. This is available to both members and non-members.

IFST has also compiled a list of its Members and Fellows who are prepared to act as consultants or provide other technical services. This list is accessible to the public on the IFST website.

== Membership ==
IFST members are drawn from all over the world from varied backgrounds including industry (manufacturing, retailing and food service), academia, government, research and development, quality assurance and food law enforcement.

=== Types of membership ===
Membership is open to professionals who are active or interested in food science and technology. Membership requirements vary depending on the type. To qualify as a Member (MIFST) or Fellow (FIFST), the applicant must present a recognised academic or professional qualification (or be able to demonstrate attainment of comparable knowledge), a certain amount of relevant experience and well-informed comments from two suitable referees. Members are bound by an ethical Code of Professional Conduct.

There are three categories of membership:

- Associate
- Member (MIFST)
- Fellow (FIFST)

Students on a food science and technology related course are eligible for Associate membership at a discounted rate.

=== UK regional branches ===
IFST has a number of regional branches across the UK, allowing members to network with other IFST members, attend meetings, and partake in activities on a local level. Each branch has their own Committee, which organises activities including conferences, meetings, competitions, lectures, and other various events.

The regional branches are:

- Scottish
- Northern Ireland
- North of England
- Midland
- South Eastern
- Eastern
- Western
- Wales

=== Professional development ===
IFST offers many opportunities for professional development. Like many other professional organisations, IFST run a Continuing Professional Development (CPD) scheme to encourage members to remain active in their careers.

Under license by the Science Council, IFST is able to award Chartered Scientist (CSci) status to food professionals (Members and Fellows) who meet the high standards and commitment to continuing professional development required by this professional recognition.

Similarly, IFST was one of just seven pilot bodies able to offer the Registered Science Technician (RSciTech) level of recognition, also under license by the Science Council. Jon Poole, IFST Chief Executive, chaired the New Register Advisory Group (NRAG) to help develop the new professional registers by the Science Council. IFST is one of the thirty-seven member bodies of the Science Council.

=== Interest groups ===
IFST interest groups provide meeting places for members with mutual interests through online forums, newsletters, events, meetings, and more.

Current interest groups:

- Food Consultancy
- Food Engineering
- Food Law
- Food Safety
- Food Sensory
- Nutrition and Health

== Publications ==
IFST publishes a range of periodicals and books on food science and technology topics.

- Food Science and Technology – A quarterly technical and information journal
- Translational Food Sciences - An open access, peer-reviewed journal publishing applied, near-market, commercially exploitable food research engaging all aspects and disciplines within the food sphere.
- The International Journal of Food Science and Technology – An open access, monthly academic journal containing peer-reviewed original papers in food science and technology
- Specialist technical guides, including Food & Drink – Good Manufacturing Practice: A Guide to its Responsible Management (5th edition and Development and Use of Microbiological Criteria for Foods
- Information Statements – Independent, objective information on food issues, prepared and peer-reviewed by experts within the IFST member community
- Advisory Statements – Advise on food safety issues, prepared and peer-reviewed by experts within the IFST community

== See also ==
- Food Science
- Food Technology
