= Manoj Chitnavis =

British teacher and chemist

Manoj Chitnavis FRSC is a British teacher and chemist.

== Education ==
Chitnavis arrived in the UK from Uganda in 1972, and settled in Devon. He studied chemistry and biology at the University of Plymouth from 1985 and was later appointed as a research assistant in environmental sciences there.

== Career ==
He subsequently started at Exeter School as a teacher in chemistry, biology and physics, where he maintained links with research, later also becoming a careers advisor. In 2009 he was elected as chair of the UK Association for Science Education, a body for connecting industry, business and research with science education. In October 2011, he was made an honorary Fellow of the Royal Society of Chemistry.
