= Chartered Statistician =

UK professional qualification

Chartered Statistician (CStat) is a professional qualification in Statistics awarded to practising professional statisticians by the Royal Statistical Society in the United Kingdom. A Chartered Statistician may use the post-nominal letters CStat.

Chartered Statistician is the Royal Statistical Society's highest professional qualification; achieving it is done through a rigorous peer-reviewed process.

The required standard for Chartered Statistician registration is typically an accredited UK MMath degree in Mathematics and Statistics, at least five years of peer-reviewed professional practice of advanced Statistics, attainment of a senior-level of technical standing, and an ongoing commitment to Continuing Professional Development.

The Royal Statistical Society's Chartered Statistician qualification is equal in status to the Accredited Professional Statistician (PStat) qualification awarded by the American Statistical Association. This formal mutual recognition entitles Chartered Statisticians and Accredited Professional Statisticians to be automatically eligible for each other's designations, should they wish to apply.

== See also ==
- Royal Statistical Society
- American Statistical Association
