= Science Council =

British professional organization

The Science Council is a UK organisation established by Royal Charter in 2003 to promote the advance of, and education in, science, for the public good.

The Science Council is the competent authority with respect to European Union directive 2005/36/EC.

It is a membership organisation for learned and professional bodies across science and its applications, and works with them to represent this sector to government and others. The member organisations together represent over 350,000 scientists.

The Science Council provides a forum for discussion and fosters collaboration among member organisations and the wider scientific, technological, engineering, mathematics, and medical communities, to enable interdisciplinary contributions to science policy and the application of science.

== History timeline ==
The Science Council was founded in 2003 by the late Professor Sir Gareth Roberts FRS, who served as the council's Founding President. In February 2007, Sir Tom McKillop FRS, became the President of the Science Council and he was succeeded in June 2011 by Professor Sir Tom Blundell, and then by Professor Sir Keith Burnett FRS in June 2016. In May 2021 Professor Carole Mundell was appointed the new president.

In November 2008 the Science Council launched Future Morph, a website aimed at providing children, parents, teachers and the general public with information about science and how it might help in future careers.

In 2015 an amended Charter was granted a Privy Council seal.

== Purpose ==
The Science Council's charitable purpose as stated in its 2015 Royal Charter is "to promote the advancement and dissemination of knowledge of and education in science, pure and applied, for the public benefit."

To fulfil this purpose, the Science Council advances professionalism in science through the professional registration of scientists and technicians who meet a high professional standard and competence and follow an established code of conduct.

The Science Council's Royal Charter also defines its role as an umbrella organisation, providing a forum to connect members for discussion and information exchange.

The Science Council provides member bodies with a forum to raise standards through sharing practice and knowledge, and to hold each other to account through a peer-review approach. A successful example of this approach is the recent Diversity, Equality and Inclusion programme of work.

== Designations ==
The Science Council promotes the profession and contribution of science and scientists through the Chartered Scientist (CSci), Registered Scientist (RSci), Registered Science Technician (RSciTech) and Chartered Science Teacher (CSciTech) designations and the development of codes of practice.

Chartered Science Teacher was launched in 2004. Registered Science Technician and Registered Scientist were launched in October 2011 alongside the Chartered Scientist award, to build a framework of professional standards and recognition across the science workforce

== Member organisations ==
- Association for Clinical Biochemistry and Laboratory Medicine
- Association for Science Education
- Association for Simulated Practice in Healthcare
- Association of Anatomical Pathology Technology
- Association of Neurophysiological Scientists
- Biochemical Society
- British Association of Sport and Exercise Sciences
- British Psychological Society
- British Society of Soil Scientists
- Chartered Institution of Water and Environmental Management
- College of Podiatry
- Geological Society of London
- Institute of Animal Technology
- Institute of Biomedical Science
- Institute of Corrosion
- Institute of Food Science and Technology
- Institute of Marine Engineering, Science and Technology
- Institute of Materials, Minerals and Mining
- Institute of Mathematics and its Applications
- Institute of Physics
- Institute of Physics and Engineering in Medicine
- Institute of Science and Technology
- Institute of Water
- Institution of Chemical Engineers
- Institution of Environmental Sciences
- The Nuclear Institute
- Oil and Colour Chemists' Association
- Operational Research Society
- Royal Astronomical Society
- Royal Meteorological Society
- Royal Society of Biology
- Royal Society of Chemistry
- Royal Statistical Society
- Society of Dyers and Colourists
- The Organisation for Professionals in Regulatory Affairs

To become a member of the Science Council an organisation must:

- Be an independent professional body which exists for the collective pursuit of professional aims and objectives with practicing scientists in its membership
- Have at least one membership category which is based on standards of competence (i.e. appropriate qualification and / or relevant professional practice)
- Become a signatory to the Science Council Declaration on Diversity, Equality and Inclusion
- Have a code of conduct for its members
