= Chartered Scientist =

British professional qualification

Chartered Scientist (CSci) is a professional qualification in the United Kingdom that is awarded by the Science Council through its licensed member organisations. Holders of this qualification can use the post-nominal letters CSci.

Chartered scientists are professional scientists who are practising and/or advancing science at the full professional level and are individuals for whom scientific knowledge or practice at that level form an essential element of their role. The required standard for Chartered Scientist registration is a master's-level science qualification accredited by one of the licensed bodies (or equivalent) with four years of postgraduate work experience.

The standards of the Chartered Scientist designation are upheld by the Science Council’s registration authority, whose members are elected representatives from the licensed bodies and appointed experts from other areas.

== Chartered Science Teacher ==
There is a specialist section of the register for scientists whose primary profession is teaching. Those registered are entitled to use the post-nominal CSciTeach. It was developed in 2007 by the Science Council in partnership with the Association for Science Education, and is also awarded by the Royal Society of Biology and the Royal Society of Chemistry.

== See also ==
- Chartered Biologist
- Chartered Chemist
- Chartered Engineer (UK)
- Chartered Physicist
- Chartered Statistician
- Chartered Mathematician
