= Association for Science Education =

The Association for Science Education
- Abbreviation: ASE
- Predecessor: Association of Public School Science Masters; Science Masters Association; Association of Women Science Teachers
- Formation: 1900s
- Type: Learned society and Professional association
- Location: Registered address: 483 Green Lanes, London, N13 4BS
- Official language: English
- Patron: HRH the Princess Royal
- President: Prof. Louise Archer
- Chair of the Association: Jane Oldham
- Chief Executive: Lynn Ladbrook
- Website: www.ase.org.uk/home/
- Remarks: Motto: Promoting Excellence in Science Teaching and Learning

The Association for Science Education (ASE) is a professional association in the United Kingdom for teachers of science and science technicians. The association was formed in 1963 and is a member of the UK Science Council.

== Aims ==
The Royal Charter of the Association for Science Education States,

"The objects and purposes for which The Association is hereby constituted are the promotion of education by the following means:

- by improving the teaching of science and
- by providing an authoritative medium through which opinions of teachers of science may be expressed on educational matters and
- by affording means of communication among all persons and bodies of persons concerned with the teaching of science in particular and with education in general."

== History ==
The ASE formed in 1963 by the merger of the Science Masters Association and the Association of Women Science Teachers. The Association for Science Education can trace its origins back to 1900. The first Annual Meeting was held in January 1901 which then led to the formation of the Association of Public School Science Masters. Incorporated by Royal Charter in October 2004, the ASE operates as a Registered Charity. The history of the ASE can be found in two publications: Interpreters of Science by David Layton and, published to celebrate the 50th anniversary of the association, Advancing Science Education: the first fifty years of the Association for Science Education, Edited by Edgar Jenkins and Valerie Wood-Robinson.

The Patron of the Association was Prince Philip, Duke of Edinburgh, KG, PC, KT, GBE, FRS, until his death in 2021. It is now HRH Princess Anne, the Princess Royal.

== Activities ==
The Association promotes improvements in science education and education in general, specifically through advice and support for teachers, technicians and others with meetings and conferences, journals and resources, curriculum and professional development programmes and contributions to research and policy debates.

=== Journals ===
The ASE produces four journals which not only keep members up to date with developments in science education but also provide ideas and tips for the delivery of science education. Their journals include:

- Primary Science (previously: Primary Science Review) - aimed at the primary sector, giving ideas for lessons and developments in primary science education.
- School Science Review - SSR is the ASE's academically peer-reviewed journal supporting 11-19 science education, to provide CPD for both readers and contributors and share research and expertise across the ASE community and wider science education network.
- Science Teacher Education Online Hub - aimed at providers of initial teacher training and aims to inform and contribute to the development of science teacher education in all phases of education.
- Journal of Emergent Science - supported by the Primary Science Teaching Trust (PSTT). JES focuses on research and the implications of research for practice and provision of science (including health, technology and engineering) for young children from birth to 11 years of age.

=== Annual Conference ===
The annual conference attracts over 2000 delegates and include 250+ talks and workshops ranging from academic lectures and exhibitions, to a social programme and themed days.

== Governance ==
An elected Education Group governs and controls the affairs of the Association. The Education Group advises the Trustees on all aspects of science education. Its 30 members represent all sectors of the science education community and speaks authoritatively on behalf of the Association. The group is led by the Chair of the Association and meets 3 times a year. The Chair of the Association is elected by the membership and serves a term of one year.

The Trustee Body has responsibility for ensuring that ASE works properly as a charity, that the finances are properly regulated and monitored and the appropriate policies are in place. The trustees meets 3 times a year and consists of 11 member trustees.

=== List of presidents and association chairs from 1963–2020 ===
| Year | Presidents | Association Chair |
|---|---|---|
| 2020 | Sir Professor John Holman | Professor Janice Griffiths |
| 2019 | Sir Professor John Holman | Mary Whitehouse |
| 2018 | Professor Danielle George | Linda Needham |
| 2017 | Professor Danielle George | Chris Colclough |
| 2016 | Professor Danielle George | Ms Corinne Stevenson |
| 2015 | Sir David Bell | Ms Christine Harrison |
| 2014 | Professor Alice Roberts | Mr Pete Robinson |
| 2013 | Professor Martin Rees, Lord Rees of Ludlow | Mrs Liz Lawrence |
| 2012 | Professor Robin Millar | Mrs Lynne Horton |
| 2011 | Professor Steve Jones | Mr Richard Needham |
| 2010 | Sir Alan Jones | Mr Manoj Chitnavis |
| 2009 | Professor Wynne Harlen | Ms Carolyn Yates |
| 2008 | Professor Micheal Earwicker | Mr Graham Kingsley |
| 2007 | Professor Dame Julia Higgins | Ms Charlotte Clarke |
| 2006 | Sir Gareth Roberts | Mr Bob Kibble |
| 2005 | Sir Mike Tomlinson | Mr David Bevan |
| 2004 | Sir Peter Williams | Dr Susan Burr |
| 2003 | Dr Gill Samuels | Ms Sue Flanagan |
| 2002 | Lord Jenkin of Roding | Mr Ian Galloway |
| 2001 | Professor Patrick Dowling | Dr Derek Bell |
| 2000 | Professor Susan Greenfield | Mrs Rebecca Edwards |
| 1999 | Sir John Horlock | Miss Rosemary Feasey |
| 1998 | Mr David Brown | Mr Roger McCune |
| 1997 | Sir Brian Follett | Mrs Mary Ratcliffe |
| 1996 | Sir Neil Cossons | Mrs Jane Wheatley |
| 1995 | Dr Bridget Ogilvie | Mr David Standley |
| 1994 | Dr David Giachardi | Mr Philip Ramsden |
| 1993 | Professor Roger Blin-Stoyle | Miss Maggie Hannon |
| 1992 | Sir John Mason | Dr Boyd Gunnell |
| 1991 | Professor Hans Kornberg | Mrs Elizabeth Preston |
| 1990 | Sir Dick Morris CBE | Mr E.O. James |
| 1989 | Sir Walter Bodmer FRS | Mr E.O. James (acting) |
| 1988 | Baroness Platt of Writtle CBE | Mr Graham Hill |
| 1987 | Lord Marshall of Goring CBE FRS | Miss Angela Dixon |
| 1986 | Professor Paul Black OBE KSG | Mr John Nellist |
| 1985 | Sir George Porter FRS | Mr Geoff Barraclough |
| 1984 | Sir James Hamilton KCB MBE | Mr P.J. Scott |
| 1983 | Sir Robert Clayton CBE FEng | Miss Ruth Schofield |
| 1982 | Sir Hermann Bondi KCB FRS | Mr Maurice Savory |
| 1981 | Sir Denis Rooke CBE FRS FEng | Mr Jeff Thompson |
| 1980 | Sir Norman Lindop | Mr John Healey |
| 1979 | Mr Norman Booth | Mr A.R. Hall |
| 1978 | Mr Norman Booth | Mr Dick West |
| 1977 | Sir Alastair Pilkington FRS | Mr J.L. Lewis |
| 1976 | Professor J.F. Kerr | W.J. Kirkham |
| 1975 | Lord Bullock | A.A. Bishop |
| 1974 | Sir Derman Christopherson OBE FRS | Mrs J Glover |
| 1973 | Lord Boyle of Handsworth | W.F. Archenhold |
| 1972 | Mrs M K McQuillan | E.G. Breeze |
| 1971 | Dr J.L. Cottrell | B.G. Atwood |
| 1970 | Professor E R Laithwaite | Helen Ward |
| 1969 | Mr J.D. Rose FRS | E.H. Coulson |
| 1968 | Professor Sir Ronald Nyholm FRS | F.C. Brown |
| 1967 | Professor Sir Ronald Nyholm FRS | J J Bryant |
| 1966 | Lord F S Dainton | H F Broad |
| 1965 | Sir John Cockcroft | R H Dyball |
| 1964 | Sir Patrick Linstead | Miss F M Eastwood |
| 1963 | Sir Robert Aitken | |

== Awards ==
The ASE is involved with many awards including:

- Chartered Science Teacher (CSciTeach)
- Registered Scientist
- Registered Science Technician

== See also ==
- Glossary of areas of mathematics
- Glossary of astronomy
- Glossary of biology
- Glossary of chemistry
- Glossary of engineering
- Glossary of physics
