= Chartered Institution of Highways and Transportation =

British learned society

- Established: 1930 (as the Institute of Highways Engineers)
- Type: Professional association
- Headquarters: Britannia Walk, London, UK
- Region served: Worldwide
- Members: 13,000+
- Key people: President: Mitesh Solanki; Chief Executive: Sue Percy CBE
- Website: www.ciht.org.uk

The Chartered Institution of Highways and Transportation (CIHT, formerly the Institution of Highways and Transportation) is a British learned society for the planning, design, construction, maintenance and operation of land-based transport systems and infrastructure.

The CIHT offers routes to qualifications such as Chartered and Incorporated Engineer status and also Chartered transport planning professional. Additionally, it has 12 regional UK branches and several overseas branches that all run local events and technical meetings.

The CIHT is a board-governed professional body. The main aims of the Council and Boards are to act as the decision-making bodies for the CIHT and deliver the strategy, business plans and outputs on behalf of the membership. The CIHT is a member of the Construction Industry Council.

== History and chartered status ==
The history of the Institution of Highways and Transportation began in 1930 when it was simply called the Institution of Highway Engineers and more a gentleman's club than a qualifying body. The addition of 'transportation' to the functions of highway engineers emerged from the Buchanan Report, Traffic in Towns. The Institution did not take the name on board until the 1980s, when the Prime Minister, Margaret Thatcher, repealed local highway authorities' 40-year-old powers of direction over local planning authorities' powers to grant planning permission for property development, threatening the integrated land use, transport, and socio-economic development system that had been created after the Second World War.

Later (1992), the UK Government signed Agenda Item 21 of the Rio de Janeiro UN Summit Conference about integrating developmental and environmental considerations in planning, and a road traffic reduction private members bill attained Royal Assent in 1997. This was followed by a rehashing of the statutory development plan system in 2000 and the introduction of composite local service boards into the planning system in 2005 (including police, fire and rescue services, health and ambulance services, education and welfare services, and employment and housing services); planning applicants had to submit 'Access and Design Statements' with their planning applications demonstrating they had taken all highways and transportation considerations into account, and additional 'Transport Statements' if proposed developments exceeded particular thresholds. This spawned new interest in the design of public places to improve conditions for pedestrians and cyclists, and for users of public transport and car-sharing clubs, to curtail carbon emissions.

The organization was granted a royal charter on 7 December 2009 and changed its name to "Chartered Institution of Highways and Transportation".

== Activities ==
=== Transport Advice Portal ===
The Transport Advice Portal (TAP) website is a joint venture involving the Department for Transport (DfT) and the CIHT. TAP has been devised to direct members of the transportation profession and the general public to core documents in a range of subject areas that focus on the management of user groups on roads in the UK. The portal acts as a repository of web links to documents that are seen as key guides to the planning, design and operation of road networks.

=== CIHT Futures ===
CIHT FUTURES explores the implications of different scenarios for transport policy and practice.

=== Campaign for Safe Road Design ===
In July 2008 the IHT, as it then was, became a partner in the Campaign for Safe Road Design which called on the UK government to make safe road design a national transport priority.

=== Highways Sector Council ===
The Highways Sector Council, which includes the CIHT and several major highways contractors, was formed in late 2019, seeking to provide a single voice for the highways industry. In April 2020, the Institute of Highway Engineers, with six other organisations, formed the Highways Industry Alliance.

== Post-nominal letters ==
Fellow of the Chartered Institution of Highways and Transportation	FCIHT
Member of the Chartered Institution of Highways and Transportation	MCIHT
Associate Member of the Chartered Institution of Highways and Transportation	AMCIHT
Graduate Member of the Chartered Institution of Highways and Transportation	GRADCIHT
Chartered Transport Planning Professional	CTPP
