= Professional transportation planner =

Certification program

A professional transportation planner is a professional engaged in the practice of transportation planning, relating to the transportation aspects of urban planning and infrastructure planning.

== Professional Certification in the United States ==
In the United States, a professional transportation planner is certified in one of two ways: as a Certified Transportation Planner by the American Institute of Certified Planners, the professional institute of the American Planning Association, or as a Professional Transportation Planner by the Transportation Professional Certification Board, an autonomous body affiliated with the Institute of Transportation Engineers. Only a small percentage of practicing transportation planners in the United States hold either the CTP or PTP credential. A select number of transportation planners choose to obtain both certifications.

=== Certification by the American Planning Association ===
The American Institute of Certified Planners (AICP) awards the Certified Transportation Planner (AICP CTP) certificate to professional planners who have achieved an advanced level of expertise in transportation planning. The Advanced Specialty Certification recognizes planners for their expertise and leadership specifically within transportation planning.

AICP CTP certification is possible only for planners who are members of AICP in good standing, have at least eight years of work experience in the transportation planning field, and pass a rigorous exam administered annually. Certification must be maintained by meeting certain requirements.

=== Certification by the Transportation Professional Certification Board ===
The Transportation Professional Certification Board, an independent organization affiliated with the Institute of Transportation Engineers (ITE), awards the Professional Transportation Planner (PTP) certificate to professional planners with demonstrated education and experience in transportation planning.

PTP certification is possible only for planners who have an accredited degree in planning or transportation, have at least three years (for master's degree and Ph.D. holders) or four years (for bachelor's degree holders) of work experience in the transportation planning field, and pass a rigorous exam administered three times annually. Certification must be renewed every three years. ITE membership is not required to possess certification.

== Professional Certification in the United Kingdom ==
In the United Kingdom, professional transportation planners are certified as a Transport Planning Professional (TPP) and are members of Chartered Institution of Highways and Transportation and the Transport Planning Society. The TPP certification is an equivalent designation as the Charter Engineer.

== Professional Certification in Canada ==
In Canada, certain provinces restrict the use of the title Professional Planner (PP) to those licensed planners who have passed both an exam and an accredited degree.

== See also ==
- Transportation planning
- Urban planning
- Professional traffic operations engineer
- Traffic operations practitioner specialist
- Traffic signal operations specialist
