= Canadian Capacity Guide For Signalized Intersections =

Publication on traffic signal controlled roadway intersections

The Canadian Capacity Guide for Signalized Intersections (CCG) is a publication of the Canadian Institute of Transportation Engineers (CITE). It provides a methodology that allows Traffic Engineers to plan, design, and evaluate traffic signal controlled roadway intersections.

The CCG has been based on the current experience of practicing traffic engineers, transportation educators and students across Canada, and a considerable body of Canadian and international research. But while developed in Canada, its methodology is applicable to conditions anywhere. The survey procedures included in the CCG provide direction for users in any country to collect local data which can be used to obtain geographically specific results.

== Objectives ==
Many cities and metropolitan areas experience traffic congestion on some portions of their transportation networks. These municipalities also suffer from constrained urban space and limited financial resources, but they share the desire to improve the quality of their environment. The analytical tools to understand specific problems require refined methods for the evaluation of alternative solutions.

Techniques included in the CCG allow Traffic Engineers to analyze various situations and intersection configurations. This Guide emphasizes the importance of a clear definition of the objectives of signal operation at a specific location. It also provides an understanding of the role that the intersection plays in the travel patterns, public transportation, and both motorized and non-motorized modes of transportation.

The focus of the CCG is on the movement of traffic flow units, such as cars, trucks, transit vehicles, cyclists, and pedestrians at signalized intersections. The main parameter is the time dimension that determines how efficiently the available roadway space is used by conflicting traffic streams. The allocation of time to the movement of vehicular and pedestrian traffic in lanes and crosswalks influences not only intersection capacity, but also a number of other measures that describe the quality of service provided for the users. To this end, and to provide input to investigations of possible impacts, the Guide provides both analytical and evaluation methods, and a set of up-to-date numerical parameters for Canadian conditions.

Using the Guide, it is possible to assess a variety of solutions by application of a set of practical evaluation criteria. The evaluation criteria, or measures of effectiveness, provide the user with a comprehensive account of intersection operation. Two of the key measures of effectiveness are total person delay and delay to pedestrians. These criteria are essential as the prerequisites for an equitable treatment of all modes of transportation, especially public transit. Other performance measures relate the Guide to environmental, economic and safety analyses, and serve as vital information for transportation demand modelling.

Delay and the ratio of volume to capacity are two key parameters widely used in the profession to assess the performance of an intersection. The Guide focuses on the ratio of volume to capacity as a rational measure of how well the intersection is accommodating demand, but it is acknowledged that delay is also widely used (for example, in the Highway Capacity Manual). Whether one parameter or the other is the most relevant is the subject of ongoing debate in the profession. It is advisable to consider both parameters in the assessment of an intersection, at the level of the individual movement, the approach and the intersection as a whole.

== Scope ==
The Guide provides a set of techniques that can be applied to operational, design and planning problems at signalized intersections. The operational procedures deal with a detailed assessment of operating conditions within a relatively short time frame when all factors are known or can be reasonably estimated. The design process is used to determine specific control parameters and geometric features of an intersection that will meet desired design objectives and performance criteria. Planning techniques, often called functional design, are useful for longer-range problems, assisting in the determination of the type of the facility and its basic dimensions. The basic method remains the same for all three application types, but the level of detail varies.

Wherever possible, the Guide utilizes formula-oriented techniques that can be applied both in manual calculations and computer programs, including spreadsheet tables. Although advanced simulation and other computerized techniques may prove to be superior to formula based methods in the future, the understanding of the fundamentals contained in the Guide remains essential.

Where practical, measured input parameters and measured output performance criteria are preferable to calculated values. Correct and consistent survey methods as well as a critical assessment of the degree of precision and reliability of the survey results are essential.

The principles and components of the timing design and evaluation processes are based on the international state-of-the-art in both the research and practice for intersection control. As a consequence, a knowledgeable user will find many similarities to other international documents. Nevertheless, some individual procedures, especially with respect to saturation flow and evaluation criteria, may differ because they were developed, tested, or adjusted for specific Canadian conditions. Some methods and parameter values are a direct result of the work on this Edition, but wherever possible, the original references or sources are identified. The Guide allows the evaluation of existing or future intersection control or geometric conditions relative to travel demand. It does not deal directly with broad systems or network issues, such as transportation demand management or congestion management. The results of the procedures included in the Guide, however, can be used as information for the evaluation of the impact of intersection control, or geometric alternatives on system aspects, such as population mobility, accessibility of various destinations or land use strategies. Although safety is an integral part of all traffic considerations, the Guide does not address this broad and complex issue explicitly. It is left to other specialized documents.

== Third Edition (2008) ==
Similar to the First Edition, the new Third Edition of the Guide concentrates mostly on urban applications. Although the procedures focus on fixed-time signal operation, advice is provided for their adjustment to the design and evaluation of traffic responsive signal control, including the traffic actuated method. The objectives of the current 3rd edition of the Guide were as follows:

- to update and expand the Guide with respect to current practice;
- to consolidate the available Canadian information and experience on planning, design, and evaluation of signalized intersections in one document;
- to contribute to information exchange among Canadian transportation and traffic engineering professionals, and to further develop an advanced national practice;
- to provide guidance for both experienced and novice practitioners;
- to assist in the education of present and future transportation professionals.

== CITE & ITE ==
The Canadian Capacity Guide for Signalized Intersections has been developed as a special project of the Canadian Institute of Transportation Engineers or CITE. This organization is composed of more than 1,700 transportation engineers, planners, technologists and students across Canada.

CITE comprises District 7 of the Institute of Transportation Engineers, which consists of transportation professionals in more than 70 countries who are responsible for the safe and efficient movement of people and goods on streets, highways and transit systems.

== Software Tools ==
The CITE has sanctioned the development of a 3rd party software solution, InterCalc, that fully supports the CCG methodology. In addition, PTV Vistro, developed by PTV Group, has integrated the Canadian Capacity Guide (CCG) methods into the software since the release of Version 6. This integration allows users to analyze small to large signalized urban networks in a modern traffic analysis software platform.
