= TSOS =

TSOS may stand for

- Traffic Signal Operations Specialist, a certification sponsored by the Transportation Professional Certification Board.
- Time Sharing Operating System, a mainframe operating system from RCA run their Spectra computers.
- Godzilla: Tokyo S.O.S., a 2003 film
- The Shadow of Saganami, a 2004 science fiction novel by David Weber.
