= Traffic operations practitioner specialist =

Certification sponsored by the Transportation Professional Certification Board

A Traffic Operations Practitioner Specialist (TOPS) is a certification sponsored by the Transportation Professional Certification Board, Inc., and promulgated by the Institute of Transportation Engineers. Prior to taking the required exam, an individual must have at least five years of related working experience, though academic experience may be substituted for this requirement. Additionally, as the certification is not intended for professionals, licensed professional engineers are not permitted to be a certified TOPS.

== Exam ==
There is a 100-question certification examination.

== See also ==
- Traffic Engineering
- Professional Traffic Operations Engineer
- Traffic Signal Operations Specialist
- Professional Transportation Planner
