= Transportation planning =

Process of planning for movement of people and goods

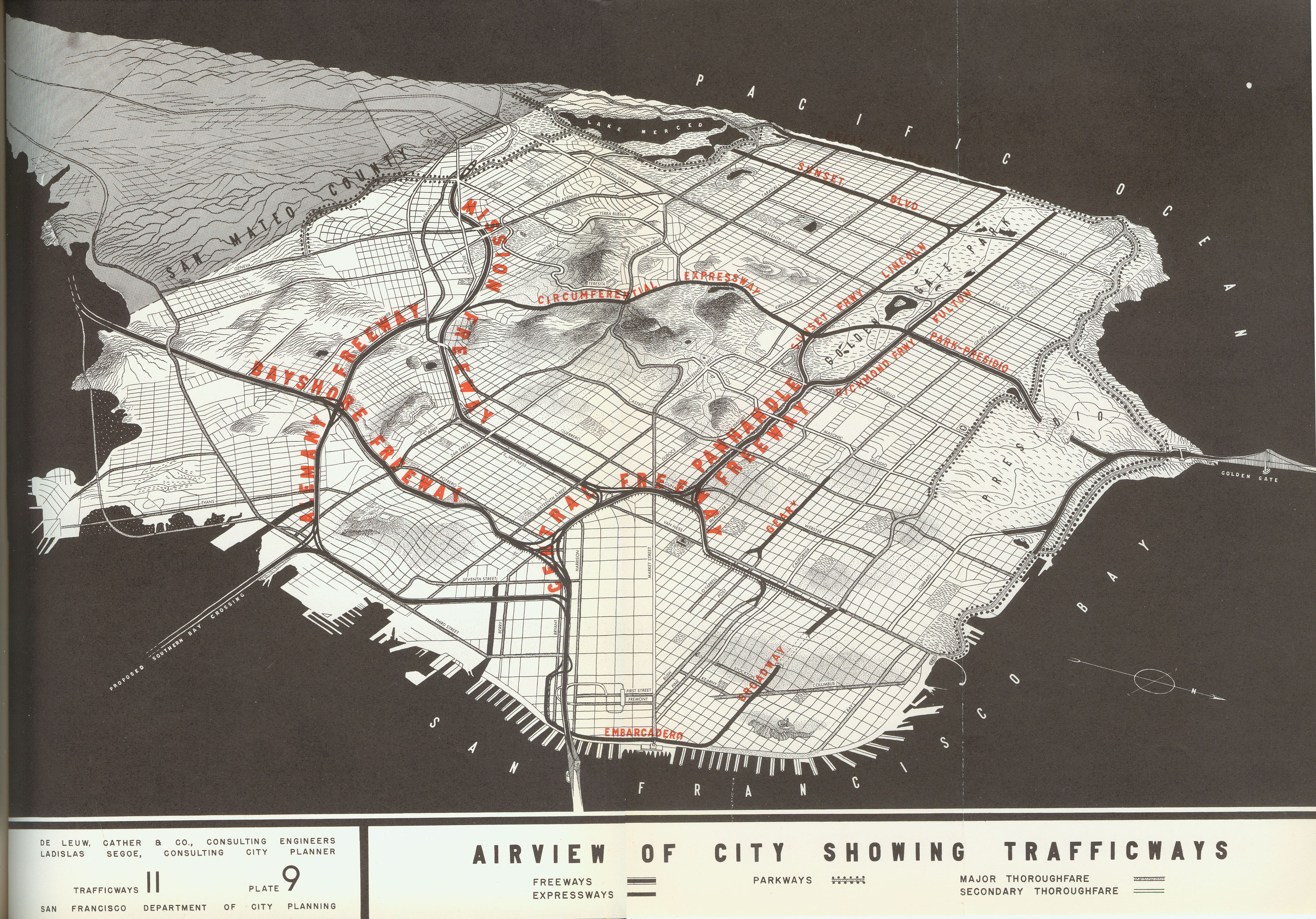
1948 San Francisco roadway plan which inspired the Freeway Revolt

Transportation planning is the process of defining future policies, goals, investments, and spatial planning designs to prepare for future needs to move people and goods to destinations. As practiced today, it is a collaborative process that incorporates the input of many stakeholders including various government agencies, the public and private businesses. Transportation planners apply a multi-modal and/or comprehensive approach to analyzing the wide range of alternatives and impacts on the transportation system to influence beneficial outcomes.

Transportation planning is also commonly referred to as transport planning internationally, and is involved with the evaluation, assessment, design, and siting of transport facilities (generally streets, highways, bike lanes, and public transport lines).

== Models and sustainability ==
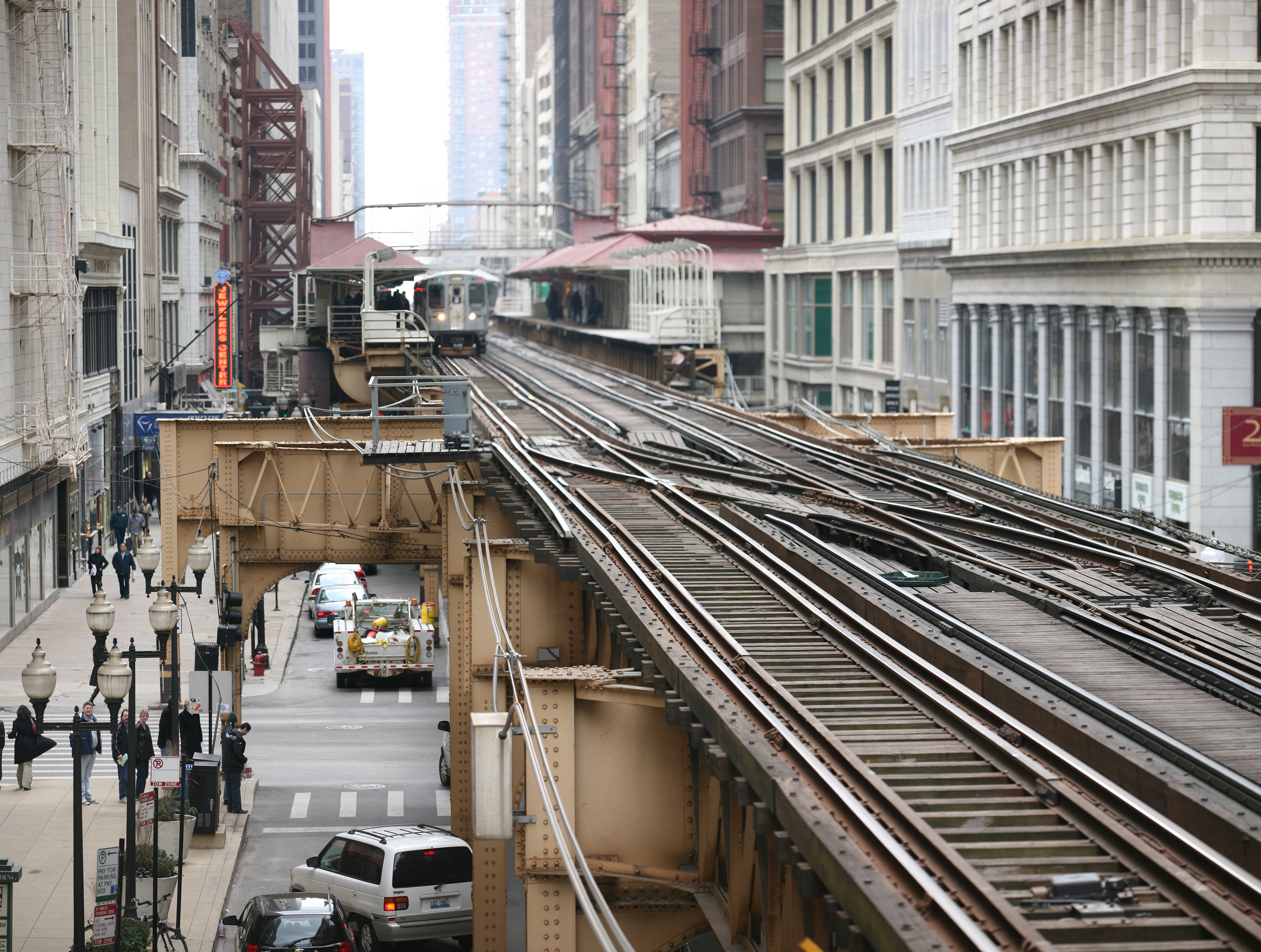
Chicago Transit Authority Chicago 'L' trains use elevated tracks for a portion of the system, known as the Loop, which is in the Chicago Loop community area. It is an example of the siting of transportation facilities that results from transportation planning.

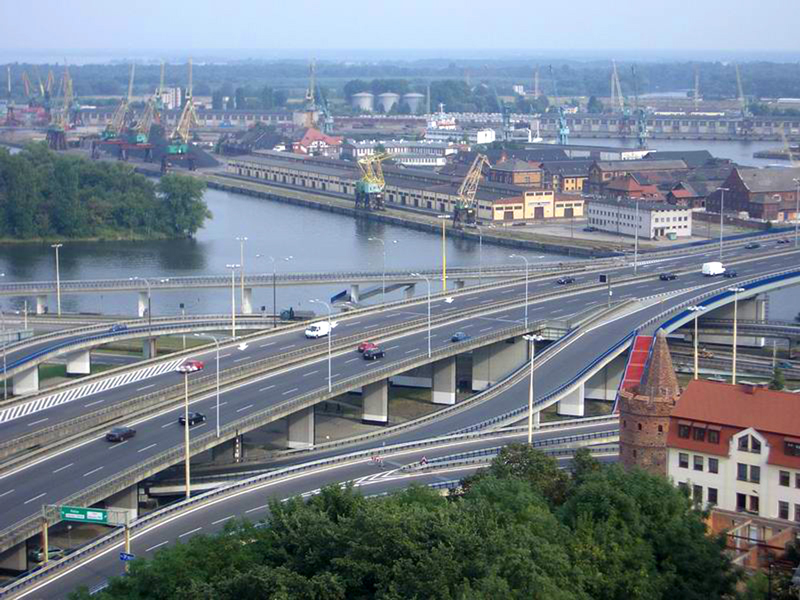
A bypass the Old Town in Szczecin, Poland

Transportation planning, or transport planning, has historically followed the rational planning model of defining goals and objectives, identifying problems, generating alternatives, evaluating alternatives, and developing plans. Other models for planning include rational actor, transit oriented development, satisficing, incremental planning, organizational process, collaborative planning, and political bargaining.

Planners are increasingly expected to adopt a multidisciplinary approach, especially due to the rising importance of environmentalism. For example, the use of behavioural psychology to persuade drivers to abandon their automobiles and use public transport instead. The role of the transport planner is shifting from technical analysis to promoting sustainability through integrated transport policies. For example, in Hanoi, the increasing number of motorcycles is responsible for not only environmental damage but also slowing down economic growth. In the long run, the plan is to reduce traffic through a change in urban planning. Through economic incentives and attractive alternatives experts hope to lighten traffic in the short run.

While quantitative methods of observing transport patterns are considered foundation in transport planning, the role of qualitative and mixed-methods analysis and the use of critical analytical frameworks has increasingly been recognized as a key aspect of transport planning practice which integrates multiple planning criteria in generating, evaluating, and selection policy and project options.

== United Kingdom ==
In the United Kingdom, transport planning has traditionally been a branch of civil engineering. In the 1950s and the 1960s, it was generally believed that the motor car was an important element in the future of transport as economic growth spurred on car ownership figures. The role of the transport planner was to match motorway and rural road capacity against the demands of economic growth. Urban areas would need to be redesigned for the motor vehicle or impose traffic containment and demand management to mitigate congestion and environmental impacts. The policies were popularised in a 1963 government publication, Traffic in Towns. The contemporary Smeed Report on congestion pricing was initially promoted to manage demand but was deemed politically unacceptable. In more recent times, the approach has been caricatured as "predict and provide" to predict future transport demand and provide the network for it, usually by building more roads.

The publication of Planning Policy Guidance 13 in 1994 (revised in 2001), followed by A New Deal for Transport in 1998 and the white paper Transport Ten Year Plan 2000 again indicated an acceptance that unrestrained growth in road traffic was neither desirable nor feasible. The worries were threefold: concerns about congestion, concerns about the effect of road traffic on the environment (both natural and built) and concerns that an emphasis on road transport discriminates against vulnerable groups in society such as the poor, the elderly and the disabled.

These documents reiterated the emphasis on integration:

- integration within and between different modes of transport
- integration with the environment
- integration with land use planning
- integration with policies for education, health and wealth creation.

This attempt to reverse decades of underinvestment in the transport system has resulted in a severe shortage of transport planners. It was estimated in 2003 that 2,000 new planners would be required by 2010 to avoid jeopardizing the success of the Transport Ten Year Plan.

In 2006, the Transport Planning Society defined the key purpose of transport planning as:

to plan, design, deliver, manage and review transport, balancing the needs of society, the economy and the environment.

The following key roles must be performed by transport planners:

- take account of the social, economic and environmental context of their work
- understand the legal, regulatory policy and resource framework within which they work
- understand and create transport policies, strategies and plans that contribute to meeting social, economic and environmental needs
- design the necessary transport projects, systems and services
- understand the commercial aspects of operating transport systems and services
- know about and apply the relevant tools and techniques
- must be competent in all aspects of management, in particular communications, personal skills and project management.

The UK Treasury recognises and has published guidance on the systematic tendency for project appraisers to be overly optimistic in their initial estimates.

== United States ==
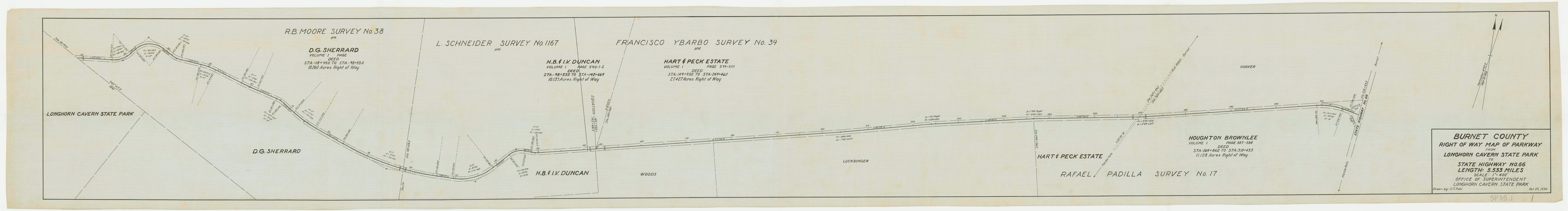
A Civilian Conservation Corps (CCC) map of the planned route of a parkway. During the 1930s, the CCC was actively involved in creating and improving roads throughout rural areas and parks

Transportation planning in the United States is in the midst of a shift similar to that taking place in the United Kingdom, away from the single goal of moving vehicular traffic and towards an approach that takes into consideration the communities and lands through which streets, roads, and highways pass ("the context"). More so, it places a greater emphasis on passenger rail networks, which had been neglected until recently. This new approach, known as Context Sensitive Solutions (CSS), seeks to balance the need to move people efficiently and safely with other desirable outcomes, including historic preservation, environmental sustainability, and the creation of vital public spaces.

The initial guiding principles of CSS came out of the 1998 "Thinking Beyond the Pavement" conference as a means to describe and foster transportation projects that preserve and enhance the natural and built environments, as well as the economic and social assets of the neighborhoods they pass through. CSS principles have since been adopted as guidelines for highway design in federal legislation. Also, in 2003, the Federal Highway Administration announced that under one of its three Vital Few Objectives (Environmental Stewardship and Streamlining) they set the target of achieving CSS integration within all state Departments of Transportation by September 2007.

In recent years, there has been a movement to provide "complete" transportation corridors under the "complete streets" movement. In response to auto-centric design of transportation networks, complete streets encompass all users and modes of transportation in a more equitable manner. The complete streets movement entails many of the CSS principles as well as pedestrian, bicycle and older adult movements to improve transportation in the United States.

These recent pushes for changes to the profession of transportation planning has led to the development of a professional certification program by the Institute of Transportation Engineers, the Professional Transportation Planner in 2007. In response an advanced form of certification - the Advanced Specialty Certification in Transportation Planning was developed by the American Planning Association thereafter in 2011. The Certified Transportation Planner credential is only available for those professional planners (AICP members) who have at a minimum of eight years of transportation planning experience.

=== Technical process ===
Most regional transport planners employ what is called the rational model of planning. The model views planning as a logical and technical process that uses the analysis of quantitative data to decide how to best invest resources in new and existing transport infrastructure.

Since World War II, this attitude in planning has resulted in the widespread use of travel modelling as a key component of regional transport planning. The models' rise in popularity can also be attributed to a rapid increase in the number of automobiles on the road, widespread suburbanization and a large increase in federal or national government spending upon transport in urban areas. All of these phenomena dominated the planning culture in the late 1940s, 1950s and 1960s. Regional transport planning was needed because increasingly cities were not just cities anymore, but parts of a complex regional system.

The US process, according to Johnston (2004) and the FHWA and Federal Transit Administration (FTA) (2007), generally follows a pattern which can be divided into three different stages. Over the course of each of three phases, the metropolitan planning organization (MPO) is also supposed to consider air quality and environmental issues, look at planning questions in a fiscally constrained way and involve the public. In the first stage, called preanalysis, the MPO considers what problems and issues the region faces and what goals and objectives it can set to help address those issues. During this phase the MPO also collects data on wide variety of regional characteristics, develops a set of different alternatives that will be explored as part of the planning process and creates a list of measurable outcomes that will be used to see whether goals and objectives have been achieved. Johnston notes that many MPOs perform weakly in this area, and though many of these activities seem like the "soft" aspects of planning that are not really necessary, they are absolutely essential to ensuring that the models used in second phase are accurate and complete .

The second phase is technical analysis. The process involves much technical maneuvering, but basically the development of the models can be broken down as follows. Before beginning, the MPO collects enormous amounts of data. This data can be thought of as falling into two categories: data about the transport system and data about adjacent land use. The best MPOs are constantly collecting this data.

The actual analysis tool used in the US is called the Urban Transportation Modeling System (UTMS), though it is often referred to as the four-step process. As its nickname suggestions, UTMS has four steps: trip generation, trip distribution, mode choice and trip/route assignment. In trip generation, the region is subdivided into a large number of smaller units of analysis called traffic analysis zones (TAZs). Based on the number and characteristics of the households in each zone, a certain number of trips is generated. In the second step, trip distribution, trips are separated out into categories based on their origin and purpose: generally, these categories are home-based work, home-based other and non-home based. In each of three categories, trips are matched to origin and destination zones using the data that has been collected.

In mode choice, trips are assigned to a mode (usually auto or transit) based on what's available in a particular zone, the characteristics of the household within that zone and the cost of the mode for each mode in terms of money and time. Since most trips by bicycle or walking are generally shorter, they are assumed to have stayed within one zone and are not included in the analysis. Finally, in route assignment, trips are assigned to the network. As particular parts of the network are assigned trips, the vehicle speed slows down, so some trips are assigned to alternate routes in such a way that all trip times are equal. This is important because the ultimate goal is system-wide optimization, not optimization for any one individual. The finished product is traffic flows and speeds for each link in the network.

Ideally, these models would include all the different behaviours that are associated with transport, including complex policy questions which are more qualitative in nature. Because of the complexity of transport issues, this is often not possible in practice. This results in models which may estimate future traffic conditions well, but are ultimately based on assumptions made on the part of the planner. Some planners carry out additional sub-system modelling on things like automobile ownership, time of travel, location of land development, location and firms and location of households to help to fill these knowledge gaps, but what are created are nevertheless models, and models always include some level of uncertainty.

The post-analysis phase involves plan evaluation, programme implementation and monitoring of the results. Johnston notes that for evaluation to be meaningful it should be as comprehensive as possible. For example, rather than just looking at decreases in congestion, MPOs should consider economic, equity and environmental issues.

=== Intersection with politics ===
Although a transportation planning process may appear to be a rational process based on standard and objective methodologies, it is often influenced by political processes. Transportation planning is closely interrelated to the public nature of government works projects. As a result, transportation planners play both a technical and a coordinating role. Politicians often have vastly differing perspectives, goals and policy desires. Transportation planners help by providing information to decision makers, such as politicians, in a manner that produces beneficial outcomes. This role is similar to transportation engineers, who are often equally influenced by politics in the technical process of transportation engineering design.

=== Integration with urban planning ===
Transport isochrone maps are a measure of accessibility which can be used by urban planners to evaluate sites.

== See also ==
- American Planning Association (U.S.)
- Bicycle transportation planning and engineering
- Congestion management agency
- Fossil fuel lobby
- Green transport hierarchy
- Pedestrian zone
- Low-emission zone
- List of planning journals
- Permeability (spatial and transport planning)
- Professional transportation planner (U.S.)
- Transportation engineering
- Strategic environmental assessment
- Transport planning professional (UK)
- Urban freight distribution
