= Traffic signal operations specialist =

Transportation certification

A traffic signal operations specialist (TSOS) is a certification sponsored by the Transportation Professional Certification Board, Inc., and promulgated by the Institute of Transportation Engineers. Before taking the prerequisite examination, an individual must have at least five years of related working experience, though relevant education or training may be applied toward this requirement. TSOS certification does not substitute for appropriate professional licenses when required for specific responsibilities or jurisdictions.

The 100-question certification examination currently includes the following topics:

- Principles of signals and signal systems
  - Signal control and functionality
  - Types of signals
  - Supporting hardware devices and subsystems
  - Signal coordination and progression
  - System types
  - Special user needs
  - Design standards
  - Traffic flow theory
- Elements of signal design and implementation
  - Signal phasing and geometrics
  - Preemption and priority
  - Pavement markings and signing
  - Detectors
  - Signal head, cabinet and pole placement
  - Temporary traffic control and equipment switch-over
  - Initial turn-on and timing adjustments
- Signal Timing
  - Clearance intervals
  - Isolated signal timing
  - Coordinated signal timing
  - Data collection procedures
  - Performance measures
  - Software and analysis
  - Field implementation
  - Systems control
  - Documentation
- Signal operations and safety reviews
  - Safety audit
  - Scheduled field reviews
  - Receipt of and response to public inquiries
  - Responsive field Reviews
  - Reevaluation of phasing and timing
  - Signal removal or modification
  - Asset management and documentation

== See also ==
- Traffic engineering
- Traffic signal
- Professional traffic operations engineer
- Traffic operations practitioner specialist
- Professional transportation planner
