= Advanced transportation controller =

US open platform standardization effort

The advanced transportation controller (ATC) is a standardization effort being undertaken by the United States Department of Transportation as part of their Intelligent transportation system (ITS) efforts. The ATC is being developed to provide an open platform for hardware and software for a wide variety of ITS applications. ATC has been identified as the highest priority standardization effort within the ITS community. It is being developed by the Institute of Transportation Engineers.

The ATC standard specifies a wide variety of hardware, the Linux operating system, and a defined API layer. ATC applications will use the API layer.
