= Canadian Institute of Transportation Engineers =

Transportation professional society

The Canadian Institute of Transportation Engineers (CITE) is composed of more than 1,700 transportation engineers, planners, technologists and students across Canada. Its purpose and mission is to enable professionals with knowledge and competence in transportation and traffic engineering to contribute individually and collectively towards meeting needs for mobility and safety within Canada.

CITE is an integral part of the Institute of Transportation Engineers (ITE) which consists of transportation professionals in more than 70 countries who are responsible for the safe and efficient movement of people and goods on streets, highways and transit systems.

== Canadian Capacity Guide ==
The Canadian Capacity Guide For Signalized Intersections has been developed as a special project of the CITE. It provides a methodology that allows Traffic Engineers to plan, design, and evaluate traffic signal controlled roadway intersections.
