= Victoria College of Music and Drama =

Victoria College of Music and Drama is an examinations board and distance teaching institution based in London, United Kingdom, which offers independent graded exams, medals and diplomas in music, speech and drama in the UK and selected other countries such as the Republic of Ireland, the United States, Sri Lanka, Singapore, Malaysia, Italy and Sierra Leone.

Formed in 1890 as Victoria College of Music and incorporated in 1891, the college is now solely an examining body and no longer operates a full-time teaching institution, though in its early years offered many of the services of a full conservatoire. Throughout the early and mid-twentieth century the college offered correspondence courses in theory and written subjects, maintained a network of teachers with whom tuition could be arranged both in London and local centres, and arranged summer schools and other residential courses in various disciplines. Following the Second World War the college has focused upon its work in the examining field and developing syllabuses as required but reopened its teaching department for distance teaching for diploma awards in 2019. New collaborations with universities have seen degree courses be introduced from 2021.

From its founding the college has had a mission based upon the development of the candidate. As a result, the college examines in a range of subjects, including many not offered by other boards such as contrabassoon, mandolin and ukulele, as well as a range of speech and drama subjects. In particular the college has a policy of introducing new subjects where requested to meet the needs of teachers and to match new innovations in educational policy. Examples include the new options for large ensembles and group examination within ocarina playing to take into account the UK government policy on whole class instrumental and vocal teaching. In recent years digital examination methods have also been introduced and in 2025 OfQual recognition was gained through partnership with The Learning Machine, giving UCAS points in the UK and placing qualifications on both the UK and European Qualifications Frameworks.

== Subjects ==
As a result of its broad remit, Victoria College of Music and Drama offers a range of subjects including all traditional musical disciplines, as well as more unusual ones including contrabassoon, ukulele, self-accompanied singing and mandolin. The board was a pioneer in the examination of electronic organ and still maintains a full syllabus for this instrument, as well as being the first board to offer examinations in electronic keyboard to diploma level. However the activities of the college are not confined to the sphere of music and it is very active in the field of speech and drama, offering a range of examinations in subjects as diverse as business speaking, acting, speech, Bible reading and drama production. Many of these fields are available in the full range of examinations, diplomas and medals.

== Examinations and diplomas ==
The college has a full range of examinations, with special emphasis on encouraging young beginners. This has resulted in the four introductory grades available for most subjects at First Steps, Preliminary, Preparatory and Advanced Preparatory. These examinations are aimed at players within the first twelve months of playing an instrument. Following on from these introductory grades are the standard grades 1 to 8, available in music subjects and speech and drama.

Parallel to the graded examinations is a series of medals that take the form of recitals with theory questions drawing from the same repertoire but without scales, arpeggios or musicianship tests It is also available as an additional qualification for those who take the graded exams. Medals have been awarded from the earliest years of the college's existence. The medal examinations are:

- Junior Bronze Medal
- Junior Silver Medal
- Bronze Medal
- Silver Medal
- Gold Medal
- Platinum Medal

From September 2025 the requirement for prerequisite qualifications has been removed in all subjects, though holders of theory awards can claim exemption from the discussion and theory elements within exams.

=== Diplomas ===
The college has a full system of diploma examinations, available in most fields. Until 2012 a Pre-Diploma Certificate existed and wadm the followed by the first full diploma, the Diploma of Victoria College of Music and Drama (DipVCM), which carries with it the right to post-nominal letters and reduced academic dress. The certificate was withdrawn from all subjects to come into line with other awarding bodies at the higher levels. There then follows the three standard diplomas of Associate (AVCM), Licentiate (LVCM) and Fellow (FVCM) which all carry post-nominal letters and academic dress. These are available in all fields as performers' or teachers' diplomas, as well as by composition, conducting, research and theory. There also exists the award of Certificated Teacher (CT, VCM) which is an award based upon teaching ability and the Honorary Life Membership (HonVCM) for those who have given many years service to the college as a teacher, local secretary, examiner, etc. Both these carry post-nominal letters. FVCM is also awarded as an honorary award from time to time for distinguished service to the College. Some diplomas also carry the suffix 'Ed' for Education (e.g. AVCMEd) and theology diplomas are suffixed as LVCM(Th). Teaching and education diplomas do not confer UK Qualified Teacher Status, rather they show that the examiner would recommend them to a prospective student.

The College of Violinists was founded in 1890 and became an administrative division of Victoria College of Music in 1962. In addition the diplomas noted above, the diplomas of Associate of the College of Violinists (ACV) and Licentiate of the College of Violinists (LCV) remain available through Victoria College Examinations as performance diplomas for string players, while Fellow of the College of Violinists (FCV) is awarded purely for services to the arts.

== Marking ==
Last revised in 2012

Solo one= Out of 20

Solo two= Out of 20

Solo three= Out of 20

Scales & Arpeggios= Out of 10

Questions= Out of 10

Sight Reading= Out of 10

Aural tests/ Own composition= Out of 10

Total= 100

Unsuccessful=<65

Pass= 65-79

Merit= 80-89

Distinction= 90-100

== London Music Press ==
London Music Press is the publishing arm of the college and was set up in the early 20th century to provide an inexpensive means of supplying music for Victoria College examinations. New editions of classic repertoire are published, as are new arrangements for different instruments and new contemporary music written especially for the college's examinations. As of 2020 all LMP publications were able to be purchased directly from LMPs website. LMP also releases a select range of recordings on its own label of exam material and musical theatre cast recordings.

LMP also provides publishing services to the estates of both Robin Milford and Cyril Rootham as well as historical materials from the VCM archives.
