= Institute of Transportation Engineers =

Professional organization for transportation engineers

- Abbreviation: ITE
- Founded: October 2, 1930; 96 years ago
- Type: Transportation
- Purpose: Improve mobility and safety for all transportation system users and help build smart and livable communities.
- Headquarters: Washington, D.C.
- Origins: Pittsburgh
- Region served: Worldwide
- Method: Industry standards, publications, conferences
- Members: 18,000
- International President: Gordon Meth
- Website: ite.org
- Formerly called: Institute of Traffic Engineers

The Institute of Transportation Engineers (ITE) is an international educational and scientific association of transportation professionals who are responsible for meeting mobility and safety needs. ITE facilitates the application of technology and scientific principles to research, planning, functional design, implementation, operation, policy development, and management for any mode of ground transportation.

== History ==
The organization was formed in October 1930 amid growing public demand for experts to alleviate traffic congestion and the frequency of crashes that came from the rapid development of automotive transportation. Various national and regional conferences called for discussions of traffic problems. These discussions led to a group of transportation engineers starting the creation of the first professional traffic society. A meeting took place in Pittsburgh on October 2, 1930, where a tentative draft of the organization's constitution and by-laws came to fruition. The constitution and by-laws were later adopted at a meeting in New York on January 20, 1931. The first chapter of the Institute of Traffic Engineers was established consisting of 30 men with Ernest P. Goodrich as its first president.

The organization consists of 10 districts, 62 sections, and 30 chapters from various parts of the world.

== Transportation Professional Certification Board ==
ITE founded the Transportation Professional Certification Board Inc. (TPCB) in 1996 as an autonomous certification body. TPCB facilitates multiple testing and certification pathways for transportation professionals.

- Professional Traffic Operations Engineer (PTOE)
- Traffic Signal Operations Specialist (TSOS)
- Traffic Operations Practitioner Specialist (TOPS)
- Professional Transportation Planner (PTP)
- Road Safety Professional (RSP)

== Standards development ==
ITE is also a standards development organization designated by the United States Department of Transportation (USDOT). One of the current standardization efforts is the advanced transportation controller. ITE is also known for publishing articles about trip generation, parking generation, parking demand, and various transportation-related material through ITE Journal, a monthly publication.

== Criticism ==
Urbanists such as Jeff Speck have criticized ITE standards for encouraging towns to build more, wider streets making pedestrians less safe and cities less walkable. Donald Shoup in his book The High Cost of Free Parking argues that the ITE Trip Generation Manual estimates give towns the false confidence to regulate minimum parking requirements which reinforce sprawl.

== See also ==
- National Transportation Communications for Intelligent Transportation System Protocol (NTCIP)
- Canadian Institute of Transportation Engineers
