= Transport planning professional (UK) =

Chartered Transport Planning Professional is a professional qualification for transport planners which has been developed by the Chartered Institution of Highways and Transportation and the Transport Planning Society. The professional qualification was given Chartered status in August 2019. It has been designed to provide professional recognition for transport planners at a level that equates to that of chartered engineer. The qualification requires candidates to have a range of technical competencies, provide a portfolio of evidence, and undertake a professional review.

The qualification is split into five sections:

- Knowledge and understanding of transport planning procedures and techniques
- Application of transport planning procedures and techniques
- Professional leadership
- Interpersonal skills
- Commitment and professional conduct

Those awarded transport planning professional status are entitled to use the postnominal letters CTPP.
