= Institute of Highway Engineers =

UK professional institution

- Abbreviation: IHE
- Established: 1965
- Type: Professional association
- Purpose: to provide professional development opportunities, support and leadership for individuals to achieve and maintain professional recognition.
- Professional title: Chartered Highway Engineer
- Headquarters: 4 Devonshire Street; London, W1W (United Kingdom)
- Region served: Worldwide
- Fields: Highway engineering
- Members: 3500+
- Key people: President: Martin Polland CEng FIHE; Chief Executive: Steve Spender CEng HonFIHE
- Website: www.theihe.org

The Institute of Highway Engineers (IHE), formerly the Institute of Highway Incorporated Engineers, is the professional institution for practitioners in highway and traffic engineering in the UK, offering Engineering Council registration and professional development support.

The Institute of Highway Incorporated Engineers was founded in 1965, changing its name to the Institute of Highway Engineers in 2009.

It has been registering engineers and technicians with the Engineering Council since 1972 and accrediting academic courses since 1989. The Institute awards the professional qualifications: Incorporated Engineer, Engineering Technician and Chartered Engineer.

== Membership and professional qualifications ==
The Institute of Highway Engineers is a membership organisation with approx 3500 members worldwide (2018). Membership grades include:

- Student
- Affiliate
- Apprentice (APPIHE)
- Associate (AMIHE)
- Member (MIHE)
- Fellow (FIHE)

IHE is a licensed body of the Engineering Council and can award Chartered Engineer (CEng), Incorporated Engineer (IEng) and Engineering Technician (EngTech) professional qualifications.

== Highway Engineering Academy ==
In 2018 the IHE launched the Highway Engineering Academy to accredit skills highways practitioners are expected to know and deliver in the workplace. There is a skills shortage within the highways sector and the academy provides training for highway engineers. The training can lead to an IHE Professional Certificate or Diploma; subjects include: active travel, asset management, highway maintenance, road safety engineering, transport development management, transport network resilience, traffic signal control, traffic signing and road markings, temporary traffic management and winter services. It is recognised by employers in the industry.
