= Colin Buchanan (town planner) =

Urban planner

- Born: 1907
- Died: 2001 (aged 93–94)
- Citizenship: United Kingdom
- Occupation: Urban planning Transport planning
- Notable work: Traffic in Towns

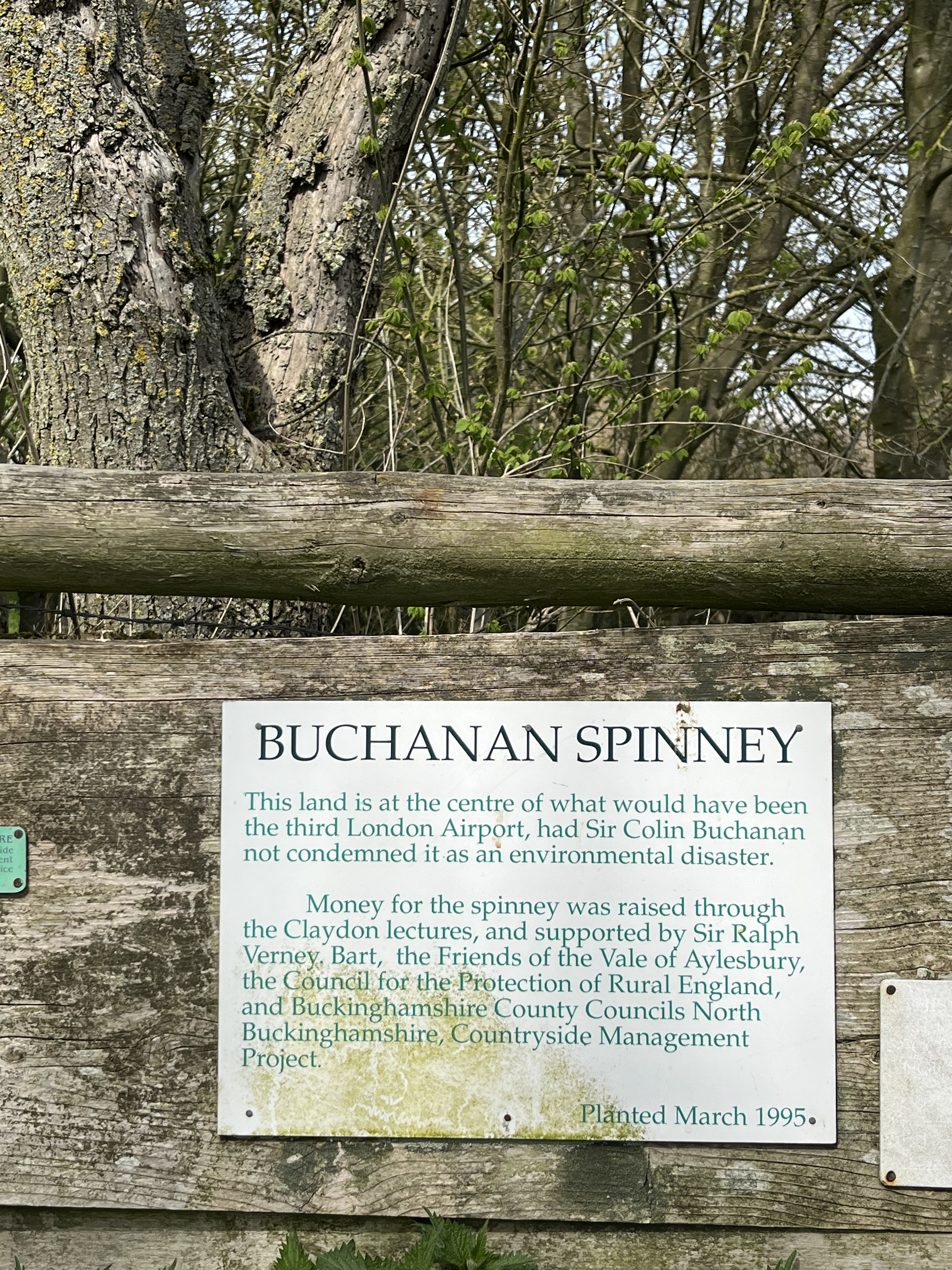

Sir Colin Douglas Buchanan CBE (22 August 1907 – 6 December 2001) was a Scottish town planner. He became Britain's most famous transport planner following the publication of Traffic in Towns in 1963, which presented a comprehensive view of the issues surrounding the growth of personal car ownership and urban traffic in the UK.

== Life ==
Buchanan was born in 1907 in Simla, India, a descendant of a long line of Scottish civil engineers. He was educated at Berkhamsted School in Hertfordshire, before studying engineering at Imperial College, London. His first work was on bridges and roads for the Public Works Department in Sudan. Returning to the UK he then worked on regional planning studies, joined the Town Planning Institute, and in 1935 joined the Ministry of Transport where he worked on trunk road schemes and road safety.

After serving in the Royal Engineers during World War II and attaining the rank of lieutenant-colonel, he left to join the new Ministry of Town and Country Planning, overseeing planning enquiries into slum clearance and reconciling traffic, planning, and environmental policies.

In 1960 the Minister of Transport, Ernest Marples, appointed Buchanan to head a working group in the Ministry of Transport. In 1963 the group produced the influential Buchanan Report, which proposed how British towns could be redesigned to accommodate growing motor car use, as car numbers in the UK were expected to quadruple over the coming decades. It gave planners a set of policy blueprints to deal with its effects on the urban environment, including traffic containment and segregation, which could be balanced against urban redevelopment, new corridor and distribution roads and precincts. These policies shaped the development of the urban landscape in the UK and some other countries for two or three decades. In 1964 Penguin Books published Traffic in Towns, which was a concise version of the 1963 Buchanan Report.

Buchanan retired from the Ministry in 1963, and held the new Chair of Transport at Imperial College London, and formed a successful consultancy, Colin Buchanan and Partners, that developed into a limited company employing around 300 staff and was subsequently chaired by his son, Malcolm Buchanan. From 2011 it became SKM Colin Buchanan.

Between 1973 and 1975 Colin Buchanan was head of the newly established School of Advanced Urban Studies at Bristol University.

In 1968-70 he was a member of the Commission for the Third London Airport (the "Roskill Commission") with a brief "to enquire into the timing of the need for a four-runway airport to cater for the growth of traffic at existing airports serving the London area, to consider the various alternative sites, and to recommend which site should be selected."

The commission's 1971 report recommended that a site at Cublington in Buckinghamshire (to the northwest of London) should be developed as London's third airport, but in a minority opinion Buchanan totally rejected the 146-page economic analysis proposing Cublington, because of the policy need to protect the open countryside around London: "It is simply unthinkable that an airport and all it implies should be brought here", and recommended Maplin Sands (also known as Foulness) to the east of London.

An Act of Parliament was passed – the Maplin Development Act 1973 – that paved the way for a Thames Estuary Airport at Maplin Sands. However, the Maplin proposal was shelved after the 1973 oil crisis, and all plans for a new four-runway airport were replaced by smaller-scale redevelopment of Stansted, a site not short-listed by the Roskill Commission.

Between 1980 and 1985 Buchanan was the President of the Council for the Protection of Rural England. He was also President of the Royal Town Planning Institute, which honoured him with a Gold Medal. Buchanan was appointed a CBE in 1964 and knighted in 1972.

Buchanan died at his home in Oxford on 6 December 2001 of bronchopneumonia.

== Publications ==
- Mixed Blessing: The Motor in Britain. London: Leonard Hill. 1958. ISBN 0-249-38901-0.
- Traffic in Towns: A Study of the Long Term Problems of Traffic in Urban Areas - Reports of the Steering Group and Working Group appointed by the Minister of Transport. London: HMSO. 1963.
- Traffic in Towns: The specially shortened edition of the 1963 Buchanan Report. Vol. S228. Harmondsworth: Penguin Books. 1964.
- No Way to the Airport: The Stansted Controversy. London: Longman. 1981. ISBN 0-582-36123-0.
