= Professional traffic operations engineer =

A Professional Traffic Operations Engineer (PTOE) is a certification sponsored by the Transportation Professional Certification Board, and promulgated by the Institute of Transportation Engineers. The certification process, which has been adopted for professional traffic operations engineers, requires that the holder be a licensed professional engineer if he or she practices in the United States, Canada or any other country that provides governmental licensing of engineers. This certification process builds on and supports the practice of professional engineering registration. The PTOE is the highest level of certification available in the field of Traffic Engineering. As of November 29, 2022, there are 3,767 licensed PTOEs worldwide, 3,562 of whom are located in the United States.

== Requirements ==
A Professional Traffic Operations Engineer (PTOE) must meet all of the following requirements:

1. Have four years of Professional Traffic Operations Engineering experience;
2. Hold a valid license issued by a state, province, or other governmental body to engage in the practice of civil, mechanical, electrical, or general engineering if he or she resides in a jurisdiction that issues such licenses.
3. Take and attain a passing score on the Professional Traffic Operations Engineer® exam; and
4. Have paid the application/examination fee and the three-year certification fee

== Exam topics ==
The 150-question certification examination currently includes the following topics:

Subject Domain / Sub-Domain	Questions
Traffic Operations Analysis	27
Roadway and intersection operations	7
Freeway operations	5
Traffic flow concepts	4
Road user characteristics and accommodations	5
Travel demand management	2
Intelligent transportation systems	4
Operational Effects of Geometric Designs	31
Design context and functional classification	4
Road user characteristics and accommodations	4
Geometric design controls and criteria	6
Roadways and roadsides	6
Intersections	6
Freeways, ramps, and interchanges	5
Traffic Safety	31
Road safety concepts	10
Safety analysis and evaluation	6
Safety countermeasures	9
Safe System Approach	6
Traffic Control Devices	26
Signing application	4
Traffic signal application	4
Marking application	3
Roadway/railroad grade crossings	3
Work zones and temporary applications	4
Road user guidance	3
Transportation Systems Management and Operations applications	2
School zone applications	3
Traffic Engineering Studies	20
Applied statistical analysis	3
Operational characteristics	5
Traffic engineering study types and applications	5
Assessment of traffic trends and performance	3
Site impact analysis	4
Social, Environmental and Institutional Issues	15
Environmental considerations	2
Transportation and land use planning	3
Multimodal considerations	3
Transportation legal considerations	4
Equity and access	3

== See also ==
- Traffic engineering (transportation)
- Regulation and licensure in engineering
- Professional transportation planner
