= University of Manchester Faculty of Science and Engineering =

University faculty in the United Kingdom

The Faculty of Science and Engineering (FSE) is one of the three faculties that comprise the University of Manchester in north west England. Established in October 2004 (when the present university came into existence), the faculty was originally called the Faculty of Engineering and Physical Sciences (EPS). It was renamed in 2016, following the abolition of the Faculty of Life Science and the incorporation of some aspects of life sciences into the departments of Chemistry and Earth and Environmental Sciences. It is organised into 2 schools (School of Engineering and School of Natural Sciences) and 10 departments: Chemical Engineering; Chemistry; Civil Engineering and Management; Computer Science; Earth and Environmental Sciences; Physics and Astronomy; Electrical & Electronic Engineering; Materials; Mathematics; and Mechanical and Aerospace Engineering.

The faculty includes most former UMIST departments, exceptions being Optometry and Neurosciences (now in the Faculty of Biology Medicine and Health), Manchester School of Management (now part of Manchester Business School, MBS), and part of the Department of Computation which was split between the School of Computer Science and MBS. The duplicated departments of Physics, Chemistry and Mathematics were merged, and Materials Science was already a joint department. In terms of the total number of staff and student numbers the faculty is larger than the whole of UMIST, which was until 1993 the Faculty of Technology of the Victoria University of Manchester (paradoxically at the same time as being an independent institution). The faculty offices are housed in the Sackville Street Building, the former UMIST Main Building.

The first dean of the faculty was Professor John Perkins, who joined the new university in 2004. Before appointment as Dean of EPS, Professor Perkins was Principal of the Faculty of Engineering and Courtaulds Professor of Chemical Engineering at Imperial College London. He was succeeded in 2009 by Prof Colin Bailey, who was head of the School of Mechanical, Aerospace and Civil Engineering. Bailey took over as acting dean on Perkins departure to become provost of the Masdar Institute of Science and Technology in May 2009, and was confirmed as Dean in December the same year. He was replaced by Chemist Martin Schröder in 2015, who served until 2025. Professor Peter Green acted as interim dean, prior to the appointment of Professor Sarah Sharples, from September 2025

In April 2016 the name was changed to the Faculty of Science and Engineering.

== History ==
The University of Manchester has a long and distinguished record of achievement in science and engineering disciplines, and a history of breaking new ground. Rutherford began his work on splitting the atom at the university (and later received the Nobel Prize in 1908 for his work on radioactivity). The world's first electronic stored-program computer, the Manchester Baby, came into being at the university, as did its successor, the Manchester Mark 1.

The University of Manchester was the birthplace of Chemical Engineering.

The world's first steerable radio telescope at Jodrell Bank was built at the University by Bernard Lovell.

Since 1906, when former student Joseph Thompson won the Nobel Prize in Physics, the faculty and its antecedent institutions have produced more than 11 Nobel laureates in Physics out of the 25 awarded to staff or students of the University of Manchester as a whole. Most recently, Manchester physicists Andre Geim and Kostya Novoselov won the 2010 Nobel Prize in Physics for their pioneering work with graphene.

The university's history is closely linked to Manchester's emergence as the world's first industrial city. Manchester businessmen and industrialists established the Mechanics' Institute to ensure that their workers could learn the basic principles of science. Similarly, John Owens, a Manchester textile merchant, left a bequest of £96,942 in 1851 for the purpose of founding a college for the education of males on non-sectarian lines. Owens College was established and granted a royal charter in 1880 to become England's first civic university, The Victoria University of Manchester.

== Industrial links ==
By 1905, the two institutions were a large and active force in the area, with the Mechanics' Institute, the forerunner of the modern UMIST, forming a Faculty of Technology and working alongside The Victoria University of Manchester. Although UMIST achieved independent university status in 1955, the two universities continued to work together, true to the visions of their pioneering industrialist founders, until they formally combined on 22 October 2004 to form a single university.

The Faculty of Engineering and Physical Sciences became home to a $100 million international research centre (2012), known as the BP International Centre for Advanced Materials (BP-ICAM). BP-ICAM is modelled on a “hub and spoke” structure, with the ‘hub’ located at The University of Manchester and the “spokes” located at the University of Cambridge, Imperial College London, and the University of Illinois at Urbana-Champaign.

== Organisational structure ==
The Faculty of Science and Engineering comprises two schools, the School of Engineering and the School of Natural Sciences, and nine research institutes.

School of Engineering

- Department of Chemical Engineering
- Department of Civil Engineering and Management
- Department of Computer Science
- Department of Electrical and Electronic Engineering
- Department of Mechanical and Aerospace Engineering

School of Natural Sciences

- Department of Materials
- Department of Earth and Environmental Sciences
- Department of Mathematics
- Department of Chemistry
- Department of Physics and Astronomy

The Faculty also includes nine Research Institutes:

- Manchester Institute of Biotechnology
- Photon Science Institute
- Dalton Nuclear Institute
- University of Manchester Aerospace Research Institute
- BP International Centre for Advanced Materials
- National Graphene Institute
- Sir Henry Royce Institute for Advanced Materials
- Thomas Ashton Institute
- Manchester Environmental Research Institute
