= MECD =

MECD may refer to:

- Ministry of Education, Culture and Sport (MECD) Spain
- Ministerio de Educación, Cultura y Deportes (MECD) Government of Nicaragua
- Manchester Engineering Campus Development (MECD) University of Manchester
- Meesmann corneal dystrophy (MECD)
- MECD - Microsoft Encarta College Dictionary
- MECD (album), 2004 Norwegian experimental album by Kaada
