= Department of Electrical and Electronic Engineering, University of Manchester =

UK academic department

Department of Electrical and Electronic Engineering (EEE)
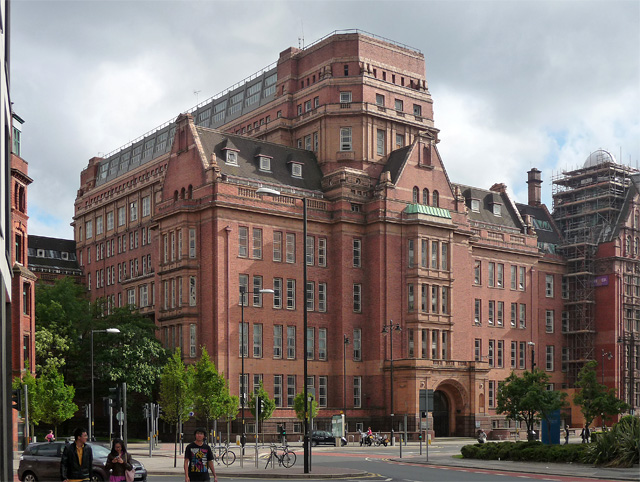
- EEE is previously located in the Sackville Street Building (now moved to Nancy Rothwell Building)
- Former names: School of Electrical and Electronic Engineering
- Affiliations: Faculty of Engineering and Physical Sciences, University of Manchester
- Location: Manchester, United Kingdom
- Website: www.eee.manchester.ac.uk

The Department of Electrical and Electronic Engineering (EEE) at the University of Manchester in Manchester, United Kingdom was formed at the merger of the Victoria University of Manchester and the University of Manchester Institute of Science and Technology in 2005.

== History ==
The Department of Electrical and Electronic Engineering at the University of Manchester in Manchester, United Kingdom was formed by the merger of the Victoria University of Manchester and the University of Manchester Institute of Science and Technology (UMIST) in 2005. It was formed largely from the former UMIST department of the same name, which originated in the Department of Physics and Electrical Engineering in the Manchester Municipal School of Technology. .

Following the formation of the University of Manchester, the department was originally known as the School of Electrical and Electronic Engineering; it was renamed in 2019 following a faculty-wide restructuring.

== Campus ==
The Department of Electrical and Electronic Engineering was originally located in the Sackville Street Building in Manchester, but has since moved to the Nancy Rothwell Building.

== Academics ==
The Department of Electrical and Electronic Engineering is affiliated with the Faculty of Engineering and Physical Sciences at the University of Manchester.

The Department of Electrical and Electronic Engineering, University of Manchester has 71 academic staff, including 28 professors.

== Notable people ==
=== Notable alumni ===
Notable alumni include the aircraft engineer Beatrice Shilling.

=== Notable faculty and staff ===
Current professors include Danielle George, a microwave engineer known for her work in public communication of science. Notable former staff includes Frederic Calland Williams and Tom Kilburn, who pioneered the first stored-program digital computer, as well as Stephen Butterworth, famous for the eponymous filter.
