= Godlee =

Godlee is a surname. Notable people with the surname include:

- Rickman Godlee (1849–1925), English surgeon
- Fiona Godlee (born 1961), British journal editor

== See also ==
- Godlee Observatory
