= Paul O'Brien (chemist) =

British academic (1954–2018)

Paul O'Brien CBE FRS FREng FRSC
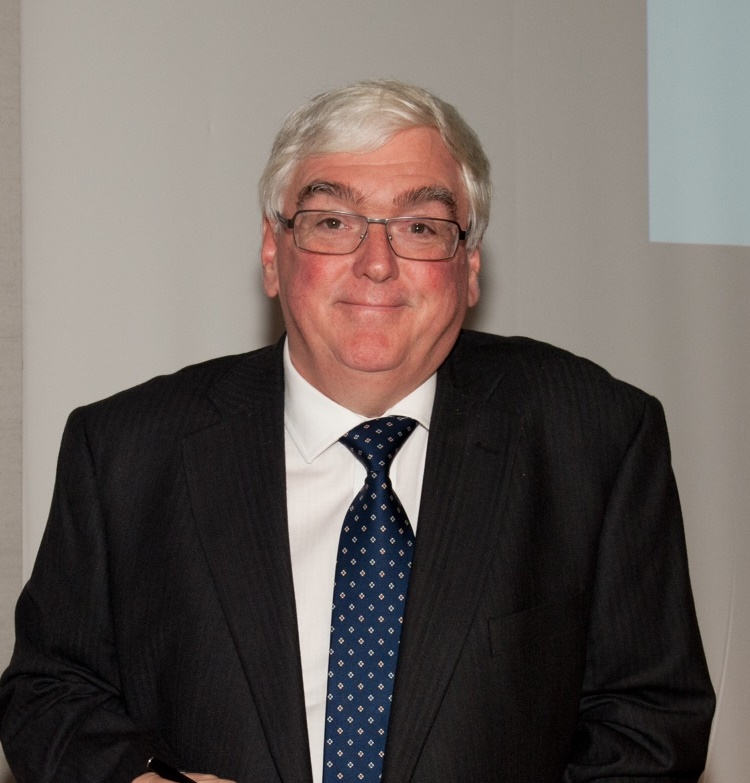
- Paul O'Brien in 2013
- Born: 22 January 1954
- Died: 16 October 2018 (aged 64)
- Education: University of Liverpool; University College, Cardiff
- Scientific career
- Fields: Inorganic chemistry; Materials science
- Workplaces: University of Manchester
- Thesis: Catalysis of the racemisation of amino acids (1978)
- Doctoral advisor: Robert D. Gillard
- Website: pob.manchester.ac.uk/pobcv.html; manchester.ac.uk/research/Paul.o'brien

Paul O'Brien (22 January 1954 – 16 October 2018) was professor of Inorganic Materials at the University of Manchester. where he served as head of the School of Chemistry from 2004 to 2009 and head of the School of Materials from 2011 to 2015. He died on 16 October 2018 at the age of 64.

== Education ==
O'Brien was educated at Cardinal Langley Grammar School in Middleton, Greater Manchester and the University of Liverpool where he was awarded a Bachelor of Science degree in 1975. He went on to complete a PhD degree at University College, Cardiff in 1978 with a thesis on the catalysis of the racemisation of amino acids supervised by Robert D. Gillard.

== Research ==
O'Brien was an inorganic materials scientist focusing on developing new chemical processes for manufacturing thin films and nanoparticles. Amongst these are chemical vapour deposition techniques for compounds containing sulphur or selenium, and a very simple method for making quantum dots – semiconductor nanocrystals that show quantum behaviour.

He collaborated on projects with physicists, computer scientists and electronic and electrical engineers. His interest in the toxicity of metal ions led to collaborations and publications with toxicologists, pharmacists and clinicians. He was an advocate of communicating science to a wider audience and gave popular talks – usually on nanotechnology – including Café Scientifique and school lectures. He edited several books, including a series on nanotechnology for the Royal Society of Chemistry (RSC).

In 2001, he founded the spin-off company, NanoCo Technologies, to commercialise the manufacture of quantum dots not containing heavy metals.

O'Brien was passionate about international development and over two decades he worked tirelessly to encourage excellence in teaching and learning across Africa, with very strong ties to the University of Zululand. His efforts changed the lives of many young African scientists and his students called him their “Father of Chemistry”.

== Awards and honours ==
O'Brien's awards include the Kroll Award, the Institute of Materials, Minerals and Mining (IOM3)'s Sir Colin Humphreys Award (for outreach) and Platinum Medal, the Society of Dyers and Colourists (SDC) Gold Medal, the RSC's first Peter Day Award, and honorary degrees from the University of Zululand, the University of Liverpool and the University of Aveiro. O'Brien was elected a Fellow of the Royal Society (FRS) in 2013; his certificate of election reads:

Paul O'Brien is distinguished for his many original contributions to chemistry and materials science, notably in the use of novel molecularly defined precursors from which to prepare important functional electronic or optical materials in well-defined forms. Processes he pioneered have been widely adopted. His discoveries include substantial improvements in the constitution, stoichiometry and nature of precursors. He has shown how relatively stable compounds can be used to prepare high quality functional materials, and developed improved methods to convert precursors into useful functional products, devising and refining ways by which nanoparticles syntheses can be controlled within the size limits require for device use

In 2016, O'Brien was appointed a Commander of the Most Excellent Order of the British Empire (CBE) in the 2016 New Year Honours for services to science and engineering, received the RSC Longstaff Prize and was elected a Fellow of the Royal Academy of Engineering (FREng).

He was elected as a member of the Academia Europaea in 2018.
