= Department of Materials, University of Manchester =

Coordinates: 53.4676°N 2.2343°W

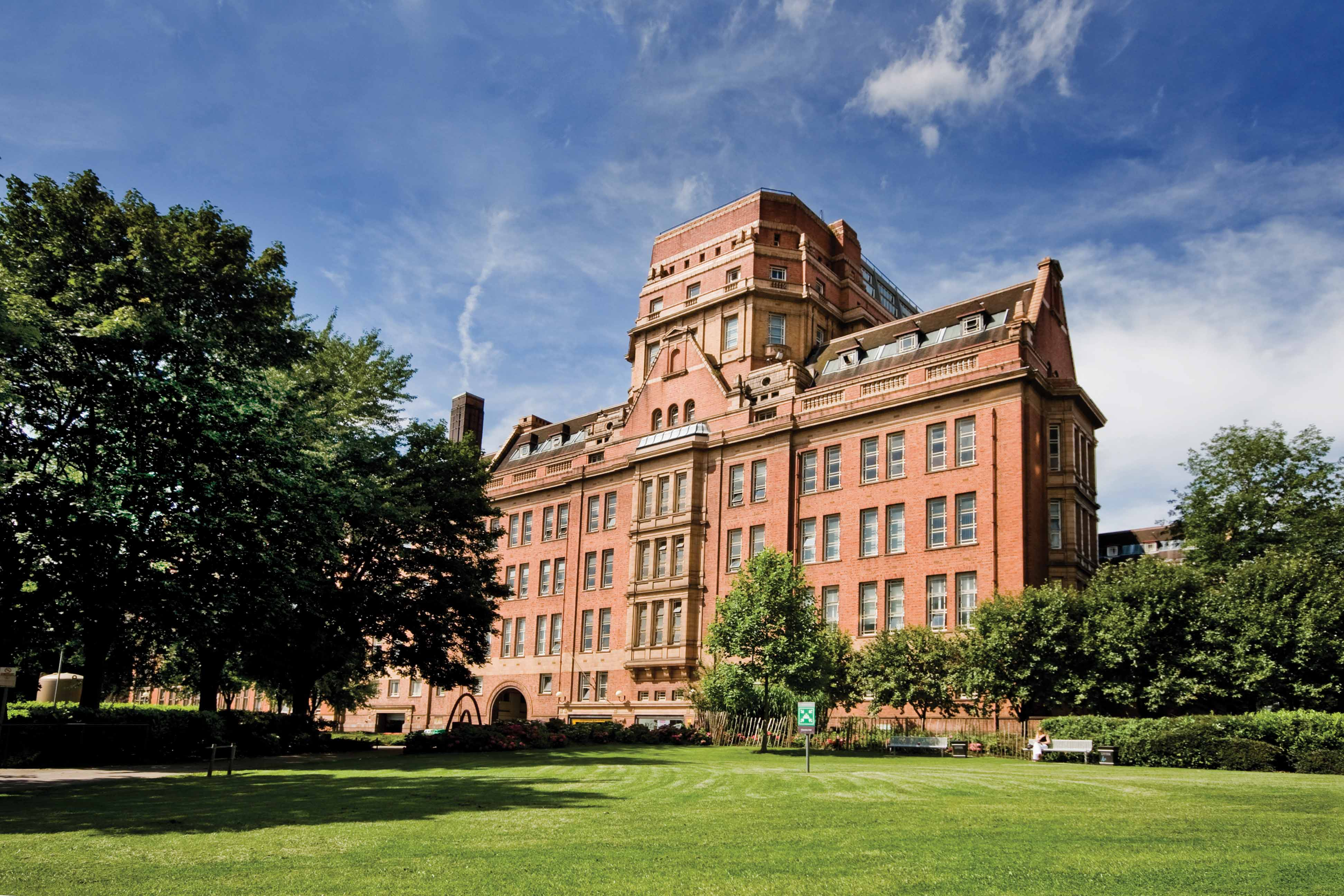
- Sackville Street Building, University of Manchester
- Former name: School of Materials (2004-2019)
- Established: 2019
- Affiliations: University of Manchester Faculty of Science and Engineering, University of Manchester
- Head of Department: Professor David J. Lewis FIMMM
- Location: Manchester, United Kingdom
- Website: materials.manchester.ac.uk

The Department of Materials, at the University of Manchester is an academic and research department specialising in Materials Science and Engineering and Fashion Business and Technology. It is the largest materials science and engineering department in Europe. This is reflected by an annual research income of around £7m, 60 academic staff, and a population of 150 research students and 60 postdoctoral research staff. The Department of Materials was formerly known as the School of Materials until a faculty-wide restructuring in 2019.

== History ==
The Department of Materials was formed following the unification of UMIST and The Victoria University of Manchester in 2004, with the fusing of the Corrosion and Protection Centre, the Manchester Materials Science Centre and the Department of Textiles and Paper. The Manchester Materials Science Centre – the old home of the Department of Materials, which has since made way for the Manchester Engineering Campus Development Project – was formed in 1988 with the merging of the UMIST Department of Polymer Science and Technology and the joint departments of Metallurgy and Materials Science.

== Teaching ==
The Department of Materials offers undergraduate, postgraduate and research courses in all aspects of materials engineering and fashion business and technology. This includes advanced materials engineering, biomaterials, corrosion control engineering, nanomaterials, polymers, textile technology and fashion management and marketing.

== Research ==
In the 2001 Research Assessment Exercise both the Material Science and Corrosion and Protection centre gained the highest rating, 5*. The School of Materials has also been ranked first for research power in the UK.

== Notable staff ==
The current Head of Department is Professor David J. Lewis FIMMM. The first Head of Department after the Faculty restructure between 2019 and 2023 was Professor Sarah Cartmell FIMMM. Between 2015 and 2019 the Head of School was Professor William W. Sampson FIMMM. From 2011 to 2015 the Head of School was Professor Paul O'Brien FRS. Other notable senior academic staff include Professor Philip J. Withers FRS, the Regius Professor of Materials, Professor Allan Matthews FRS, Professor Robert J. Young FRS, Professor Richard A. L. Jones FRS and Professor Sarah Haigh.

== Buildings ==
The Manchester Materials Science Centre was one of the main buildings of the department until its demolition in 2016. The Department of Materials was briefly located on the North Campus of the University of Manchester in 2016-2021, located in several buildings including The Mill, James Lighthill Building, Morton Laboratory, Sackville Street Building, and MSS Tower. As of 2021 the Department of Materials will is housed in the new Engineering Building on South Campus.
