= Godlee Observatory =

Observatory in Manchester, England

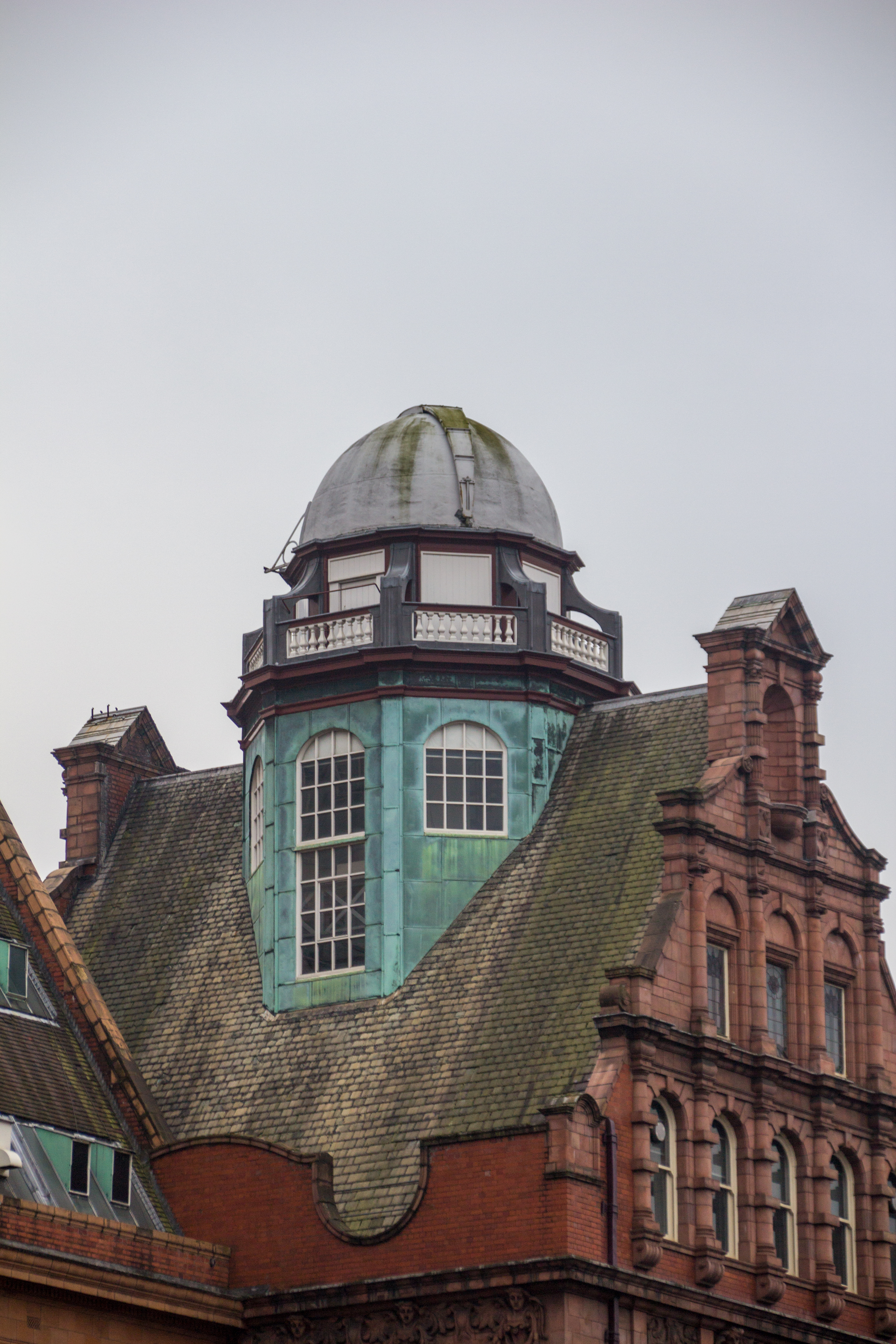
- Organization: Manchester Astronomical Society, University of Manchester
- Location: Sackville Street Building, Manchester, England
- Coordinates: 53°28′34.12″N 2°13′57.52″W
- Altitude: 77.4 m (254 ft)

Telescopes
- 8" refracting telescope: Grubb of Dublin
- 12" Newtonian reflector: Grubb of Dublin
- Related media on Commons

The Godlee Observatory is an old astronomical observatory located in a tower on the roof of the University of Manchester's Sackville Street Building, G floor (formerly UMIST Main Building), in the City Centre of Manchester, England. It was given to the city of Manchester by Francis Godlee when construction was completed in 1902. The dome is one of two made from papier-mâché to survive in the UK, the other being at Mills Observatory, and is reached by an Edwardian era wrought iron staircase and a trap door.

Godlee Observatory is home to two original telescopes made by Grubb of Dublin: a Newtonian telescope that uses a concave primary mirror and a flat diagonal secondary mirror, and a refracting telescope that uses a lens as its objective to form an image. The observatory is operated by the Manchester Astronomical Society.

As of November 2022, the Observatory is closed indefinitely due to redevelopment work on the North Campus of the University of Manchester.
