= Nancy Rothwell =

British physiologist and academic (born 1955)

Dame Nancy Rothwell DBE DL FRS FMedSci FRSB FBPhS MAE
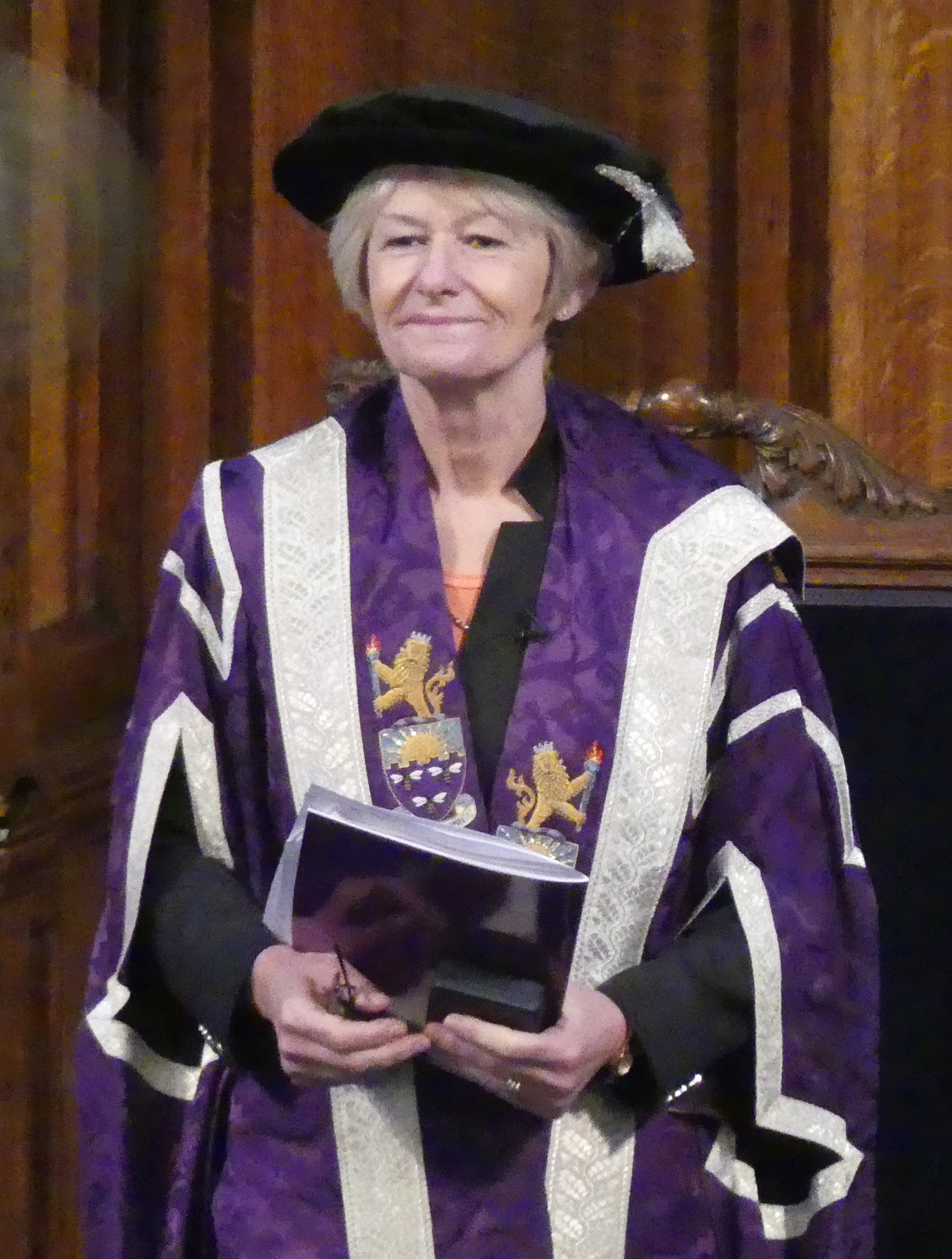
- Rothwell in academic dress for a graduation ceremony for the Department of Mathematics at the University of Manchester in 2015

President and Vice Chancellor of the University of Manchester
- In office 21 June 2010 – 31 July 2024
- Preceded by: Alan Gilbert

Personal details
- Born: Nancy Jane Rothwell; 2 October 1955 (age 71) Tarleton, Lancashire, England, UK
- Education: Penwortham Girls' Grammar School
- Alma mater: University of London (BSc, PhD, DSc)
- Salary: £260,000 (2021–22)
- Awards: Physiological Society Annual Review Prize Lecture (1998); Royal Institution Christmas Lectures (1998)
- Website: manchester.ac.uk/research/nancy.rothwell
- Scientific career
- Known for: President and Vice Chancellor of the University of Manchester; Nancy Rothwell Building
- Fields: Obesity; Strokes; Metabolism; Neuroscience; Brown adipose tissue
- Workplaces: University of Manchester; University of London; Queen Elizabeth College; AstraZeneca
- Thesis: Physiological mechanisms involved in the regulation of energy balance (1979)
- Doctoral advisor: Mike J. Stock
- Nancy Rothwell's voice from the BBC programme The Life Scientific, 2013-07-07

Dame Nancy Jane Rothwell (born 2 October 1955) is a British physiologist. She served as president and vice-chancellor of the University of Manchester from 2010 to 2024, having deputised in both roles until January 2010.

Rothwell served as non-executive director of pharmaceuticals company AstraZeneca from 2006 to 2015. She also served as co-chair of the Council for Science and Technology, and past president of the Royal Society of Biology.

She served as Deputy Lieutenant of Greater Manchester and served as chair of the Russell Group from 2020 to 2023, which represents 24 of the research intensive universities in the UK. In March 2021, students at the University of Manchester passed a vote of no confidence in Rothwell due to her response to the COVID-19 pandemic in the United Kingdom.

== Education and early life ==
Rothwell was born in Tarleton, a village near Preston, Lancashire. She was educated at Penwortham Girls' Grammar School and then went to college where she took A-levels in mathematics, physics, chemistry and art, having dropped biology aged 14. She enrolled at the University of London and obtained a first-class degree in physiology (1976) and a Doctor of Philosophy degree (1979) from Queen Elizabeth College (now part of King's College, London). Rothwell was awarded a Doctor of Science (DSc) degree in 1987 by King's College London.

== Career and research ==
Rothwell's early research identified mechanisms of energy balance regulation, obesity and cachexia. In 1984 she was awarded a Royal Society University Research Fellowship and numerous grants by the Biotechnology and Biological Sciences Research Council (BBSRC). She was appointed to a chair in physiology in 1994, then a Medical Research Council (MRC) research chair in 1998. Her current research focusses on the role of inflammation in brain disease and has identified the role of the cytokine interleukin-1 (IL-1) in diverse forms of brain injury. Her studies have begun to elucidate the mechanisms regulating IL-1 release and its action and her group have conducted the first early clinical trial of an IL-1 inhibitor in strokes. She served as president of the British Neuroscience Association and a council member of Medical Research Council (MRC).

From October 2004, Rothwell served as vice-president for research of the university. In 2010 she was overseeing a research group of about 20 scientists, with significant external funding and was announced to succeed Alan Gilbert as president and vice-chancellor of the University of Manchester on 1 July 2010. She is a trustee of Cancer Research UK, the Campaign for Medical Progress, a council member of BBSRC, chair of the Research Defence Society and the Wellcome Trust's Public Engagement Strategy Committee and a non-executive director of AstraZeneca. In 1998 she delivered the Royal Institution Christmas Lecture on The Secrets of Life, televised by the BBC.

=== President and vice-chancellor ===
In January 2010, Rothwell was appointed deputy president and deputy vice-chancellor. Until Alan Gilbert retired she was acting president due to his sick leave. On 21 June 2010, she was appointed president and vice-chancellor of the University of Manchester. She assumed her post on 1 July 2010, succeeding Gilbert, who had retired after nearly six years. She became the first woman to lead the University of Manchester or either of its two predecessor institutions. Commenting on her appointment, she said: "I am honoured and delighted to be invited to lead the University at this exciting time. I am determined to maintain the strategic focus that we have developed over the past six years and to work closely with colleagues to identify new priorities and opportunities for the University in the very challenging external environment that we will face over the next few years."

The chairman of the appointment panel and chairman-elect of the university's board of governors, Anil Ruia, said: "Dame Nancy will bring her own distinctive strengths, perspective and style to the role of President and Vice-Chancellor which will enable the University to build upon the remarkable progress that we have made under Professor Alan Gilbert's leadership." In 2009, Rothwell served as the first president of the Society of Biology.

In May 2020, Rothwell was appointed as the chair of the Russell Group, starting September 2020. The group represents 24 of the leading universities in the UK.

In 2023 it was announced that Rothwell would stand down as President and Vice-chancellor of the University in 2024.

==== Response to COVID-19 ====
In April 2020, Rothwell wrote to University of Manchester staff warning that the loss of revenue caused by the COVID-19 pandemic would result in pay cuts and possible job losses. In September 2020 she warned that students who failed to follow social distancing rules could be excluded from the university campus.

In the autumn 2020 semester the university's handling of the pandemic and the second national lockdown led to criticism and protests. In September 2020, university officials said they had taken precautions including staggered arrivals, social distancing and a reduced lecture timetable, though university staff alleged they were being pressured into conducting face-to-face teaching. In October 2020 the Fallowfield area, home to the university's Fallowfield Campus, saw more COVID-19 cases than any other part of the UK. Rothwell launched an investigation after fences were erected around campus residences in November 2020 and apologised for the university's "very poor communication" with students. Days later students began a rent strike and occupied a campus building and demanded Rothwell meet with them to discuss a proposed rent discount. Later in November, Rothwell acknowledged the university had made "mistakes" in its approach to the pandemic and said that, while many students supported the measures, others felt "let down". The inquiry issued a report in December 2020, which identified failures of project management on the university's part and a failure to engage with students; Rothwell accepted the inquiry's findings and pledged to implement its recommendations.

Also in November 2020, anti-racist campaigners called on Rothwell to resign following an incident in which a black student was detained and allegedly racially profiled by university security guards. A Universities and Colleges Union official said Rothwell should "offer a full apology" to the student "and stop trying to police the university's student population". In an interview on Newsnight, Rothwell said that she had contacted the student to apologise. At the time of the interview she had not, in fact, contacted the student, and she later apologised for claiming she had done so.

In February 2021, the University of Manchester Students' Union (UMSU) called a vote of no confidence in Rothwell, the first time in the university's history such a motion has been triggered. The students obtained the requisite 400 signatures to launch the referendum in hours. The campaign also called for the vice-chancellor to be elected by staff and students. In March 2021 the vote of no confidence was passed with the support of 89 percent of voters. The vote, however, was non-binding and a spokesperson for the university said it had "full confidence" in Rothwell.

Rothwell retired from her position as vice chancellor in July 2024 and was succeeded by Duncan Ivison.

=== Awards and honours ===
In February 2013, Rothwell was assessed as the 15th most powerful woman in the United Kingdom by Woman's Hour on BBC Radio 4. In May 2013 she was the subject of BBC Radio 4's The Life Scientific and was interviewed about her life and work by Jim Al-Khalili. Rothwell was appointed Dame Commander of the Order of the British Empire (DBE) in the 2005 Birthday Honours, Fellow of the Royal Society (FRS) in 2004, Fellow of the Royal Society of Biology (FRSB) and Fellow of the Academy of Medical Sciences (FMedSci). In 2003 she was awarded the Pfizer award by the Royal Society. Her nomination as a Fellow of the Royal Society (FRS) reads:

Nancy Rothwell has made major discoveries in the areas of energy balance, host defence responses, and neurodegeneration, several of which are now being translated into clinical benefit. Early work emphasised the importance of thermogenesis in the regulation of energy balance and the aetiology of obesity, and the role of b2 adrenoreceptor activation in muscle hypertrophy. More recently she has carried out pioneering studies of the role of cytokines and other components of the immune system within the central nervous system. She demonstrated the key role of specific cytokines and the hormone leptin in the integration and regulation by the brain of host defence responses to infection and injury. This led to important discoveries concerning the role of cytokines in neurodegeneration. She was the first to show that the cytokine IL-1 mediates ischaemic brain damage, challenging the view that immune or inflammatory processes are unimportant in the brain. She patented the use of IL-1 inhibitors to prevent acute neurodegeneration and is leading the first clinical trial of such an inhibitor in stroke. Her demonstration that caspases are involved directly in ischaemic brain damage in vivo stimulated the development of caspase inhibitors for possible clinical application. Nancy Rothwell has also worked energetically to advance physiology and neuroscience, to further public awareness of science, and to encourage women to pursue careers in science.

She is an honorary member of the British Society for Immunology and honorary fellow of Somerville College, Oxford as well as honorary member of the Manchester Literary and Philosophical Society. She has been a member of The Physiological Society since 1982 and was awarded the Physiological Society Annual Review Prize Lecture in 1998.

Rothwell was awarded an honorary Doctor of Law degree from the University of Bath in 2009. She was awarded an honorary Doctorate in Education (DEd) by Manchester Metropolitan University (MMU) in 2024.

As part of the bicentennial anniversary of the University of Manchester (1824-2024) a series of portraits of Rothwell by Carla van de Puttelaar were commissioned with one exhibited at The Whitworth art gallery. The Manchester Engineering Campus Development (MECD) and Engineering Building were renamed the Nancy Rothwell Building in 2024 to mark her retirement.

Academic offices
Preceded by Alan Gilbert	Vice Chancellor and President of the University of Manchester; 2010–present	Incumbent
Preceded by -	President of the Royal Society of Biology; 2009–2014	Succeeded by Jean Thomas
