= University of Manchester Faculty of Biology, Medicine and Health =

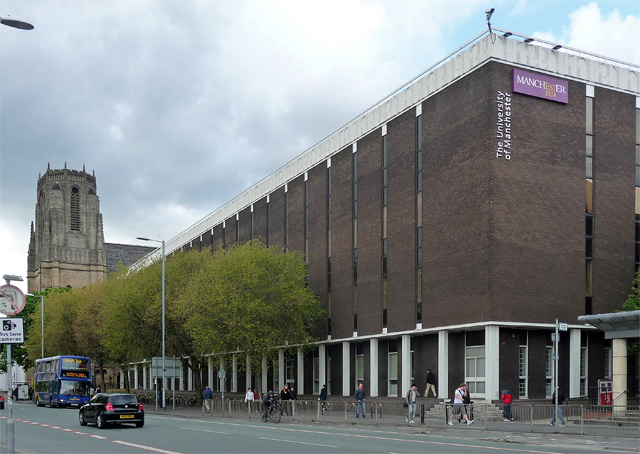
The Stopford Building

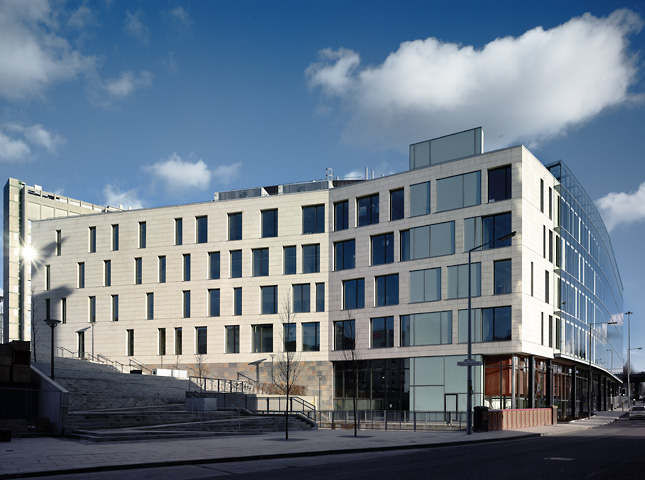
Manchester Institute of Biotechnology

The Faculty of Biology, Medicine and Health (BMH) is one of the three faculties that compose the University of Manchester. Established in August 2016, the faculty was formed by the merger of the former Faculty of Medical and Health Sciences and the Faculty of Life Sciences. The Faculty comprises three schools: The School of Biological Sciences, The School of Health Science and The School of Medical Sciences.

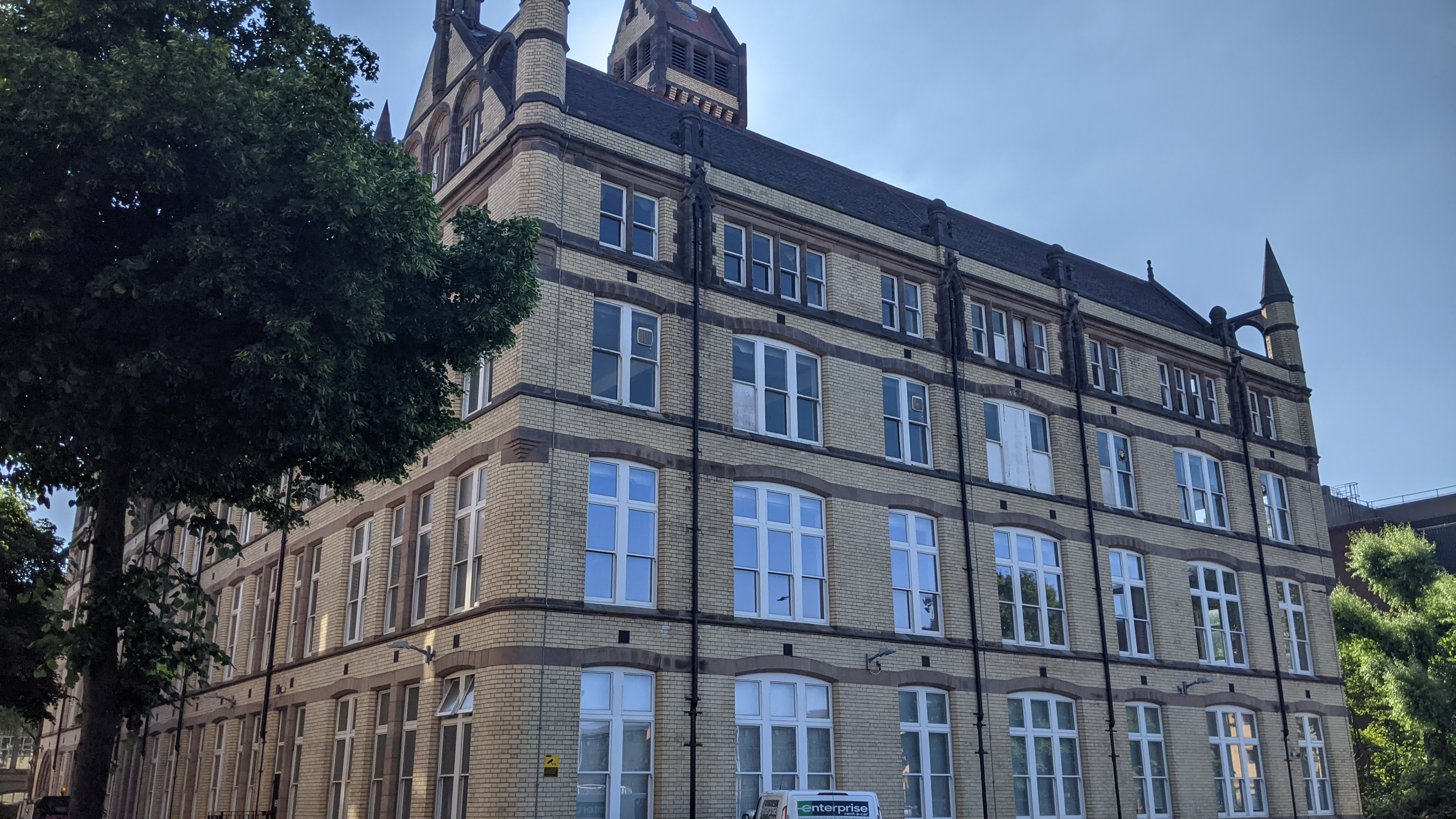
Medical School (1894)

Additionally, the Faculty also has nine subject areas which span the three schools: Biological sciences, Biomedical sciences, Dentistry, Medicine, Nursing, midwifery and social work, Optometry and ophthalmology, Pharmacy, Psychology, Speech and hearing.

== History ==
The first dean of the Faculty was Professor Ian Greer who also acted as the Vice-President of the University of Manchester. Previously, he had been the Pro-Vice-Chancellor of the Faculty of Health and Life Sciences at the University of Liverpool 2010−2015. He has since gone to Belfast to be president and vice-chancellor of Queen's University, Belfast.

The Faculty has a distinguished history. Its School of Medicine was the first medical school established in England outside London, the School of Nursing (merged with the university in 1996) was the first British school to offer a degree in the subject, and similarly Manchester was the first university to award degrees in Pharmacy.
