= Department of Chemical Engineering and Analytical Science, University of Manchester =

The Department of Chemical Engineering and Analytical Science (CEAS) University of Manchester was formed by the merger in 2004 of the former UMIST departments of Chemical Engineering, and DIAS - the Department of Instrumentation and Analytical Sciences - and the Centre for Process Integration. After formation of the University of Manchester, the department was known as the School of Chemical Engineering and Analytical Sciences, however was renamed in 2019 following a faculty-wide restructuring. The department inherits a longstanding association of Chemical Engineering and UMIST, indeed the discipline was founded by a series of lectures given there by George E. Davis in 1888.

The professors of technological chemistry in the Faculty of Technology, Victoria University of Manchester, were W. J. Pope (1905–08), E. Knecht (1909–18), F. L. Pyman (1918–27) and J. Kenner (1928-50).
