= Department of Earth and Environmental Sciences, University of Manchester =

English research department

Coordinates: 53°28′04″N 2°13′53″W

Department of Earth and Environmental Sciences, The University of Manchester
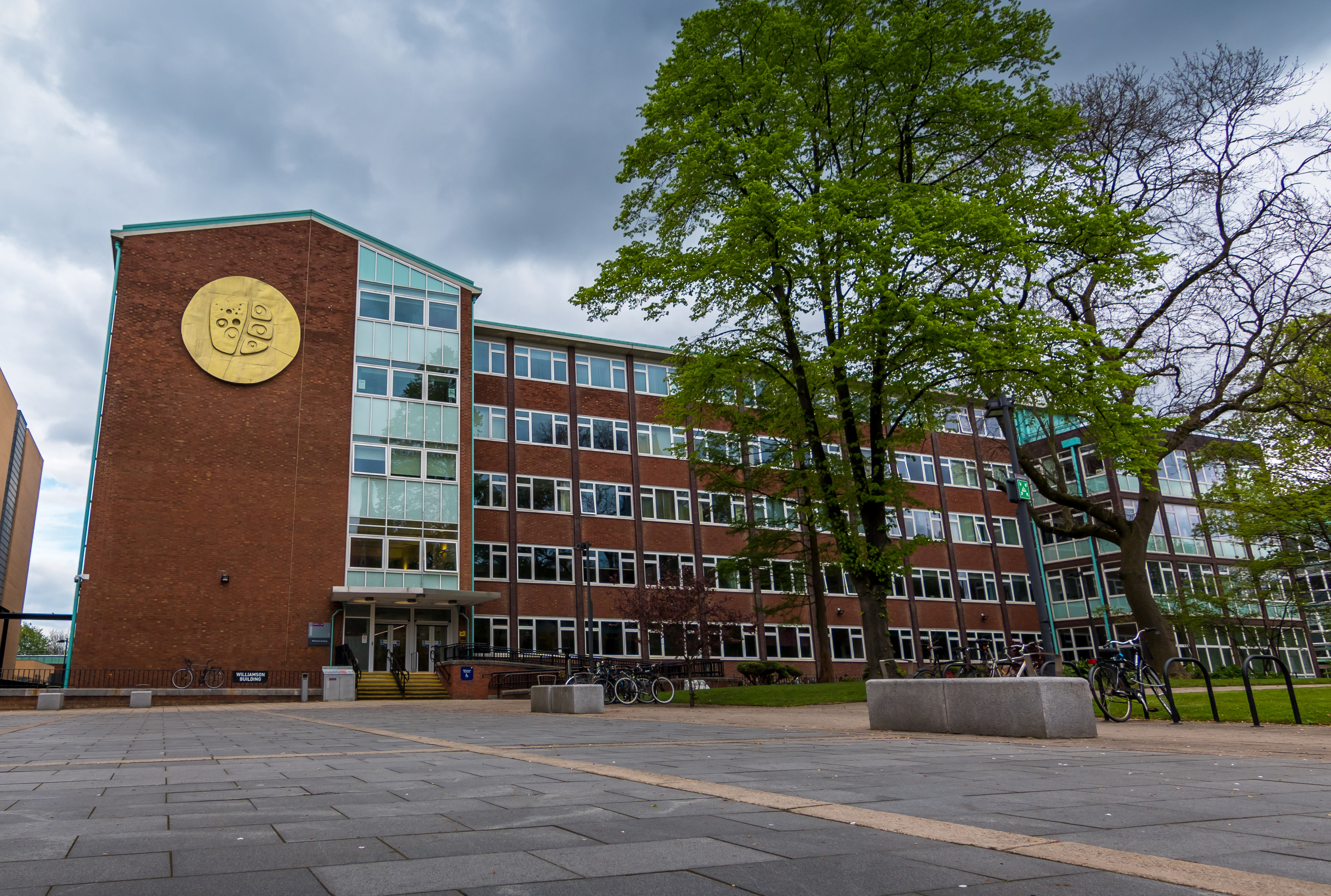
- The Williamson Building, home to the Department of Earth and Environmental Sciences
- Location: Manchester, United Kingdom
- Website: ees.manchester.ac.uk

The Department of Earth and Environmental Sciences at The University of Manchester is one of the oldest earth and environmental science departments in the UK. The department takes roughly 100 new undergraduates and 140 postgraduates each year, and employs 90 members of academic staff which include 41 postdoctoral researchers, 27 technical staff, and 20 administrative staff.

== History ==
=== Victorian origins ===
The formal study and advanced teaching of Geology began at Owens College, the precursor of the university, in 1851. At that time, W. C. Williamson was appointed as Professor of Natural History (Botany, Zology, Geology). Williamson had previously worked as Curator at the Manchester Museum from 1835 to 1838. The Manchester Museum was later incorporated into Owens College and relocated to the current Oxford Road museum site. In 1880 the Victoria University of Manchester received its Royal Charter, and William Boyd Dawkins was at this time teaching geology and paleontology. Williamson held the post of Chair of Botany at the Victoria University of Manchester until 1892. During his service years, Zoology and Geology had been established as separate departments in 1879 and 1872 respectively. William Boyd Dawkins took the Chair of Geology in 1872, and in 1880 Arthur Milnes Marshall became the Chair of Zoology.

The Honours School in Geology and Mineralogy was established in 1881, and in 1887, new laboratories (the Beyer Laboratories) were opened to provide facilities for the Departments of Botany, Geology and Zoology. At the same time, the new Manchester Museum opened its present site on Oxford Road.

=== Twentieth Century Developments ===
At the beginning of the 20th century, a paleobotanist, Marie Stopes, became the first female member of academic staff at the university. The years spanning the First World War saw upheavals and many staff changes in order to ensure continued provision and research at the university. Similarly, the Second World War restricted the capabilities and resources of the university, despite continued research and teaching. Research groups were founded and developed primarily after the war years.

In 1960, Fred Broadhurst, leading a first-year paleontology field course to Robin Hood's Bay, found ‘a complete skeleton of a fossil Plesiosaurus which was later excavated and brought back to Manchester and exhibited’. The fossil was affectionately named ‘Percy’. The finding and excavation of ‘Percy’ is mentioned several times in geology at the University of Manchester. Percy is still on display in the Manchester Museum.

Also In 1960, the Williamson building, designed by Harry M Fairhurst with artwork by sculptor Lynn Chadwick - the Manchester Sun mural, became the site for the departments of geology, botany and zoology. The department's heritage information states that, ‘In the 1990s botany and zoology moved out to join the new School of Biological Sciences, allowing room for geology to expand and develop new facilities’. As of 2001, the Williamson Building features a mural, in room G16 by palaeoartist Bob Nicholls, and in 2016 a life-size cast of the Theropod dinosaur Gorgosaurus was mounted in the Department foyer.

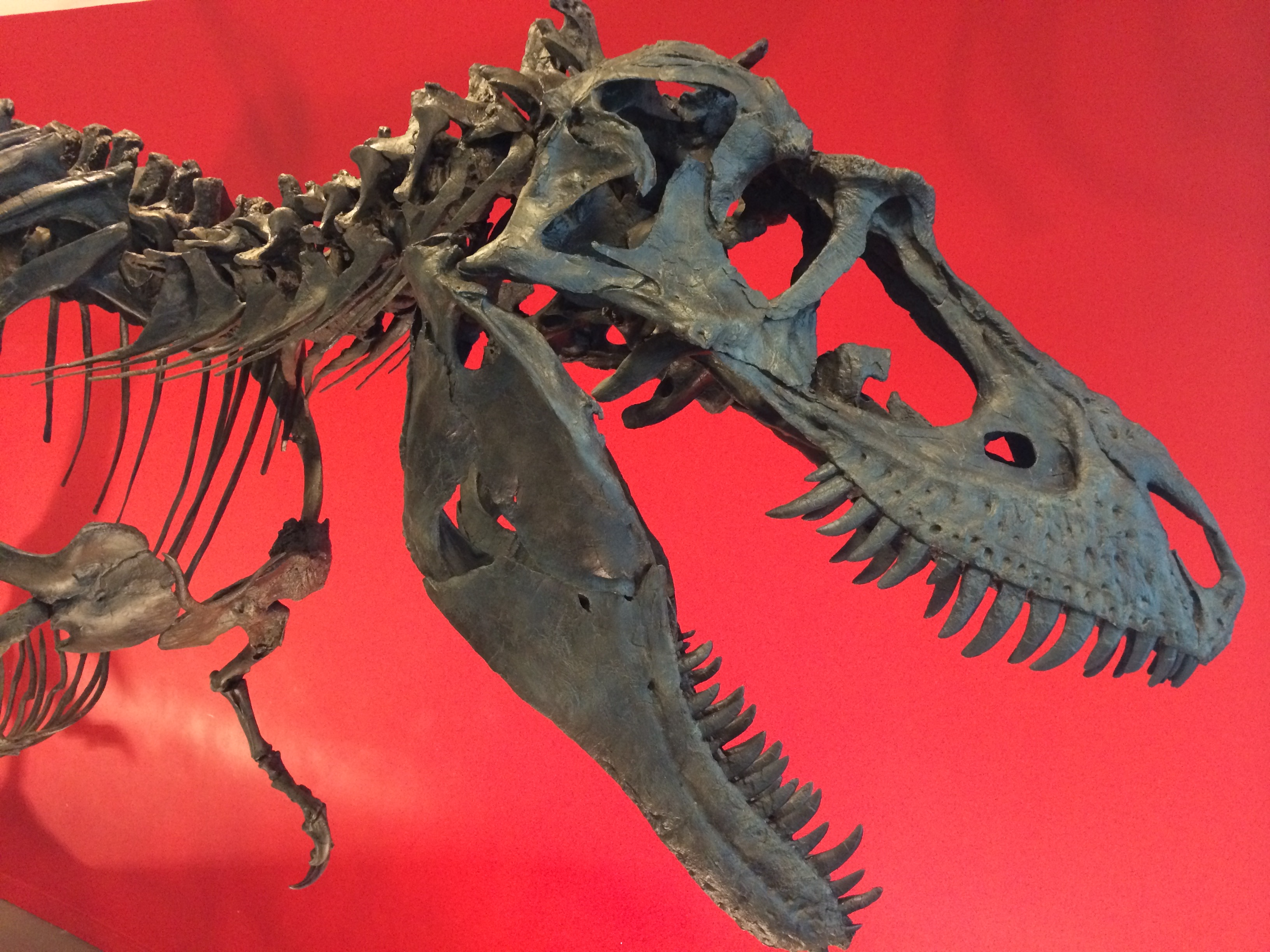
Gorgosaurus sp. on display in the Department of Earth and Environmental Sciences. The original theropod dinosaur fossil is held in the collections of The Children's Museum of Indianapolis (USA).

Substantially more space for Geology followed from the UGC Earth Science Review recommendations in 1988. Space in the basement and at ground-floor level accommodated new laboratories for rock deformation, isotope geochemistry and cosmochemistry, and mineral sciences. At first-floor level, laboratories for analysis of rock powders and solutions were established.

=== Post-merger with UMIST ===
In 2004 the Victoria University of Manchester merged with the University of Manchester Institute of Science and Technology (UMIST) to form The University of Manchester, and the disciplines of geology, environmental science and atmospheric science were brought together. At this time, the School of Earth, Atmospheric and Environmental Sciences was created. In 2017 the School was renamed to the School of Earth and Environmental Sciences and incorporated several research staff from biological sciences. In 2019, the School became the Department of Earth and Environmental Sciences within a much larger School of Natural Sciences after Faculty restructure. New funding for the William Research Centre in 2001 contributed to geomicrobiological laboratories. Research in sedimentology and basin studies was developed with computer imaging hardware, and isotope research further enhanced with the centre established in 2004.

== Research groups ==
One of the first research groups to be established at the University of Manchester was in experimental petrology in the late 1950s. W. S. MacKenzie instigated the creation of the first UK petrology lab at The University of Manchester. Research achievements historically have included:

- Research group in Physics, of which P.M.S. Blackett was a member, on rock magnetism and the nature and origin of Earth's magnetic field in the early 1950s, which contributed to later knowledge of plate tectonics.
- The acquisition of pioneering equipment used in microanalysis – 1950s onwards.
- Groundbreaking work in synchrotron radiation and geology at the Daresbury synchrotron facility - 1950s and 1960s.
- A successful bid for Apollo lunar samples for study after the 1969 Moon landings. The Moon rocks were also displayed to the public in the Manchester Museum.
- The Geoscience Research Institute at the University of Manchester (establishing interdisciplinary collaboration with industry and public sector institutions) in the early 1990s.

Research groups make use of state of the art research facilities. The department is associated with several research centres and institutes including:

- The Williamson Research Centre
- The Centre for Atmospheric Science
- The Dalton Nuclear Institute
- The centre for research in radiochemistry.
- The University of Manchester Environment Centre (UMEC).
- The Williamson Research Centre for Molecular Environmental Science (WRC).
- The University of Manchester Cosmochemistry and Isotope Geochemistry Centre.
- Interdisciplinary Centre for Ancient Life (ICAL).

== Current Developments ==
A spinout company, Salamander Group, works on developing technology to enable continuous environmental monitoring in UK water and gas industries.

The Department of Earth and Environmental Sciences currently conduct research encompassed by three particular themes: Life on Earth, Environment and Society and Earth and Planetary Science. Within the themes particular areas of expertise are situated:

=== Life on Earth ===
Conservation biology; evolutionary mechanisms and dynamics; geomicrobiology; the history of life on earth; plants, soils and ecosystems; microbial ecology.

=== Environment and Society ===
Climate and weather impacts on society; energy, water and mineral resources; environment and health; molecular environmental science; nuclear environmental science; petroleum geoscience; plants, soils and ecosystems; pollution and environmental control.

=== Earth and planetary science ===
Petrology and volcanology; planetary science; structural geology and rock physics; geomorphology; geophysics; geochemistry; climate and weather in the earth system; basins, stratigraphy and sedimentary processes; ancient life.

== Funding ==
Research in the Department of Earth and Environmental Sciences has been funded by NERC (Natural Environment Research Council), STFC (Science Technologies Facilities Council), EPSRC (Engineering and Physical Sciences Research Council), European Commission, European Research Council, as well as private industrial organisations.

== Notable faculty ==
- William Crawford Williamson – First Professor of Natural History (geology, zoology and botany) at Owens College (later Victoria University of Manchester)
- Marie Stopes - Lecturer in Palaeobotany, first female academic at The University of Manchester
- Thomas Henry Holland - Berkeley fellowship at Owens College, Manchester, Professor of Geology at the Victoria University of Manchester
- Owen Thomas Jones - Professor of Geology
- W. S. Mackenzie – Chair in Petrology, brought techniques of experimental petrology to the UK
- William Sefton Fyfe – Professor of Geochemistry
- Kathleen Mary Drew-Baker - Lecturer in Botany, known in Japan as Mother of the Sea
- Charles Gordon Hewitt - Lecturer in Zoology
