= Nancy Rothwell Building =

University of Manchester School of Engineering building

The Nancy Rothwell Building
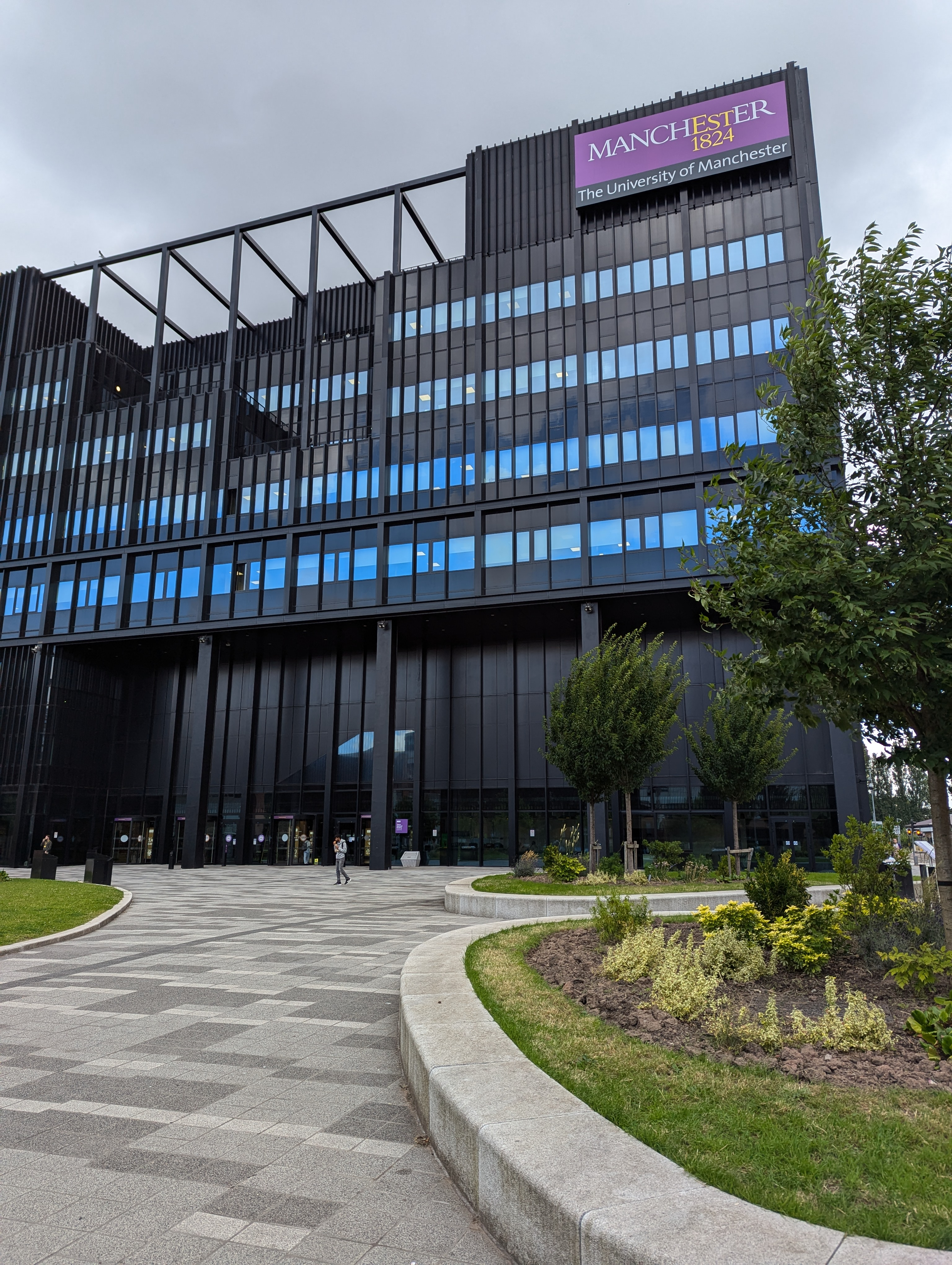
- The Nancy Rothwell Building seen from Booth Street East in 2024
- Interactive map of the The Nancy Rothwell Building area
- Former names: Manchester Engineering Campus Development (MECD); Engineering Building

General information
- Location: 53.469093°N 2.234591°W
- Construction started: 2012
- Completed: 2021
- Cost: £420 million
- Owner: University of Manchester

Technical details
- Size: 76,000m²

Design and construction
- Architect: Building Design Partnership

Website
- www.mecd.manchester.ac.uk

The Nancy Rothwell Building is home to the School of Engineering at the University of Manchester. Previously known as the Manchester Engineering Campus Development (MECD) and the Engineering Building it took nine years to design and construct and was completed in 2021.

The building has over 76,000m² of floor space spread over seven floors making it the largest home for engineering and material science in the UK. It provides a workspace to over 8,000 students, academics and staff. As of 2024 it is one of the single largest construction projects undertaken by any tertiary education institution in the UK.

== Design and construction ==
The initial budget for the building was £300 million project in 2015 rising to more than £420 million on completion.

Design and construction of the building was a collaboration between Mecanoo and the Building Design Partnership (BDP) with engineering services provided by Arup. The main contractor was Balfour Beatty with Buro Happold as the environmental sustainability advisor. The building has a BREEAM excellent rating and a green roof.

The building was constructed during period of heavy investment in buildings by universities in the United Kingdom. Such investments in building infrastructure have been criticised as a race to the bottom, building frenzy and a gold rush by critics such as Jonathan Wolff and Fionn Stevenson.

There was an earlier building on the site housing the joint Owens/UMIST department of materials science.

== Naming ==
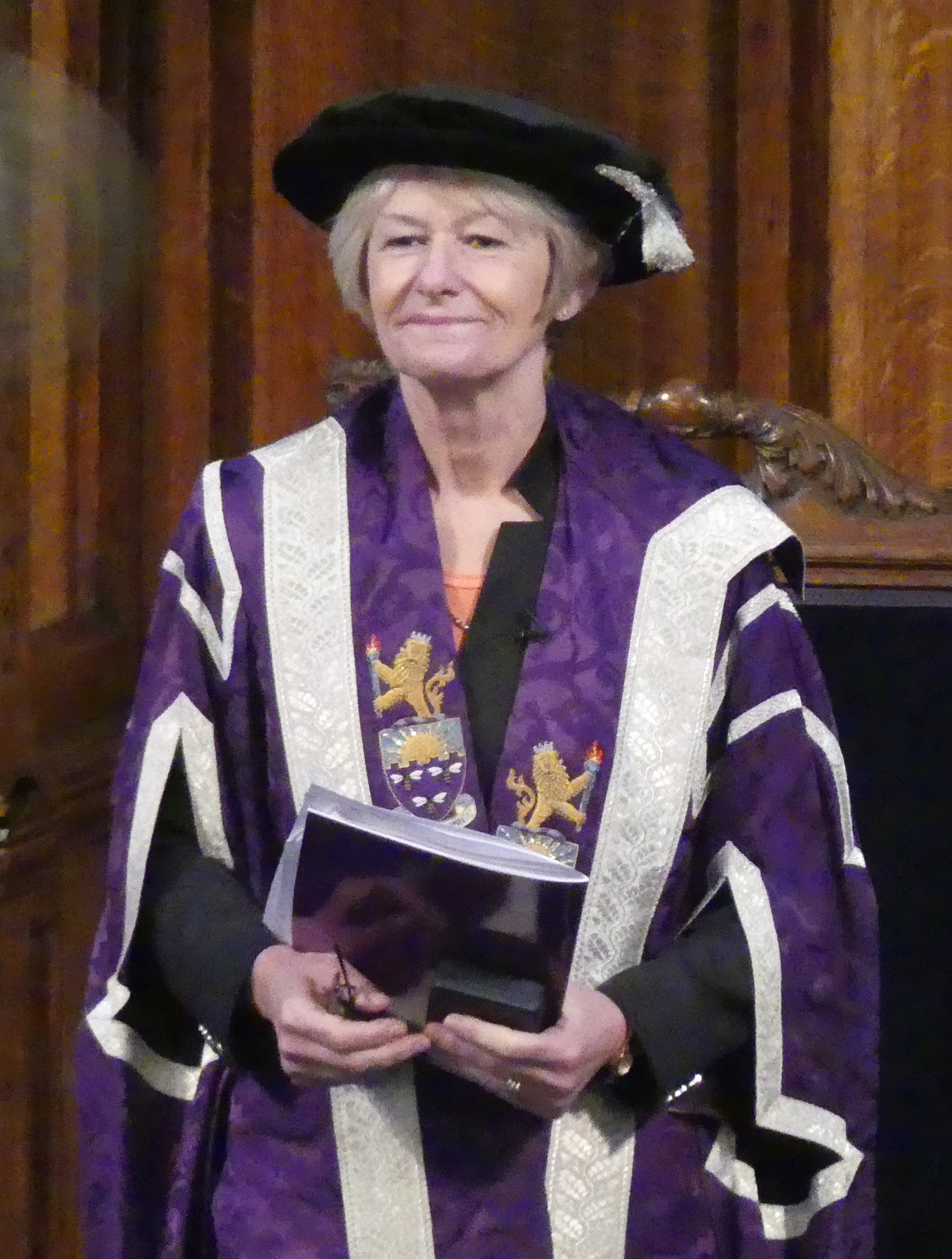
The Nancy Rothwell Building is named after Nancy Rothwell who served as Vice Chancellor of the University of Manchester from 2010 to 2024

The building was officially named after Nancy Rothwell in July 2024 to mark her retirement as Vice Chancellor of the university in 2024. It is one of the few buildings named after a woman on campus. A portrait of Nancy Rothwell by Carla van de Puttelaar is displayed on the first floor outside the main lecture theatre.

Previously the building had been known as the Engineering Building and the Manchester Engineering Campus Development (MECD).

In 2026, the University of Manchester Students' Union debated the renaming of the building, due to Rothwell's "significant friction with the student body", especially the 2020 and 2023 protests at the university.
