= Sackville Street Building =

Building in Manchester, England

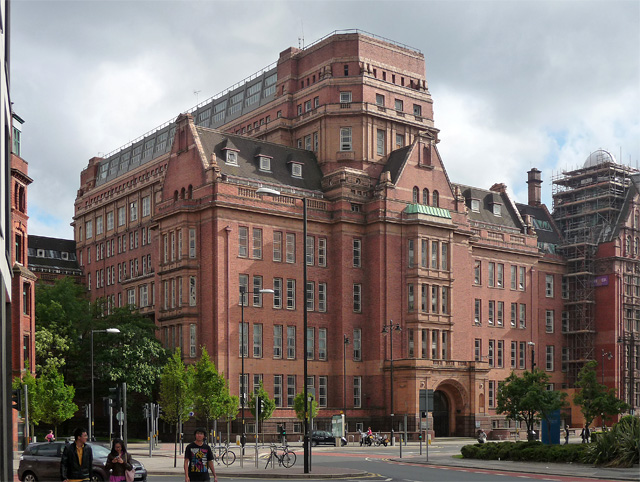
- The Sackville Street building from Whitworth Street/Aytoun Street
- Former names: UMIST Main Building

General information
- Status: Grade II
- Type: Academic
- Architectural style: French Renaissance
- Location: Manchester, England
- Coordinates: 53.4764°N 2.2342°W
- Construction started: 1895
- Inaugurated: 1902
- Renovated: 1927–1957
- Owner: Bruntwood SciTech

Technical details
- Floor count: 12

Design and construction
- Architects: Spalding & Cross
- Designations

Listed Building – Grade II
- Official name: Institute of Science and Technology (University of Manchester)
- Designated: 2 October 1974
- Reference no.: 1246276

Renovating team
- Architect: Bradshaw Gass & Hope

The Sackville Street Building is a building on Sackville Street in Manchester, England. The University of Manchester occupies the building which, before the merger with UMIST in 2004, was UMIST's "Main Building". Construction of the building for the Manchester School of Technology began in 1895 on a site formerly occupied by Sir Joseph Whitworth's engineering works; it was opened in 1902 by the then prime minister, Arthur Balfour. The School of Technology became the Manchester Municipal College of Technology in 1918.

First designed by Spalding & Cross architects and built using Burmantofts terracotta, the building was subsequently extended along Whitworth Street, towards London Road, between 1927 and 1957 by the architects Bradshaw Gass & Hope, the delay being due to the depression in the 1930s and the Second World War. Originally, a swimming pool was planned for the top floor, but after concerns that the weight of water might cause structural issues, it was instead used as a dug-in gymnasium and in more recent years as an examination hall. The building was listed at Grade II in 1974.

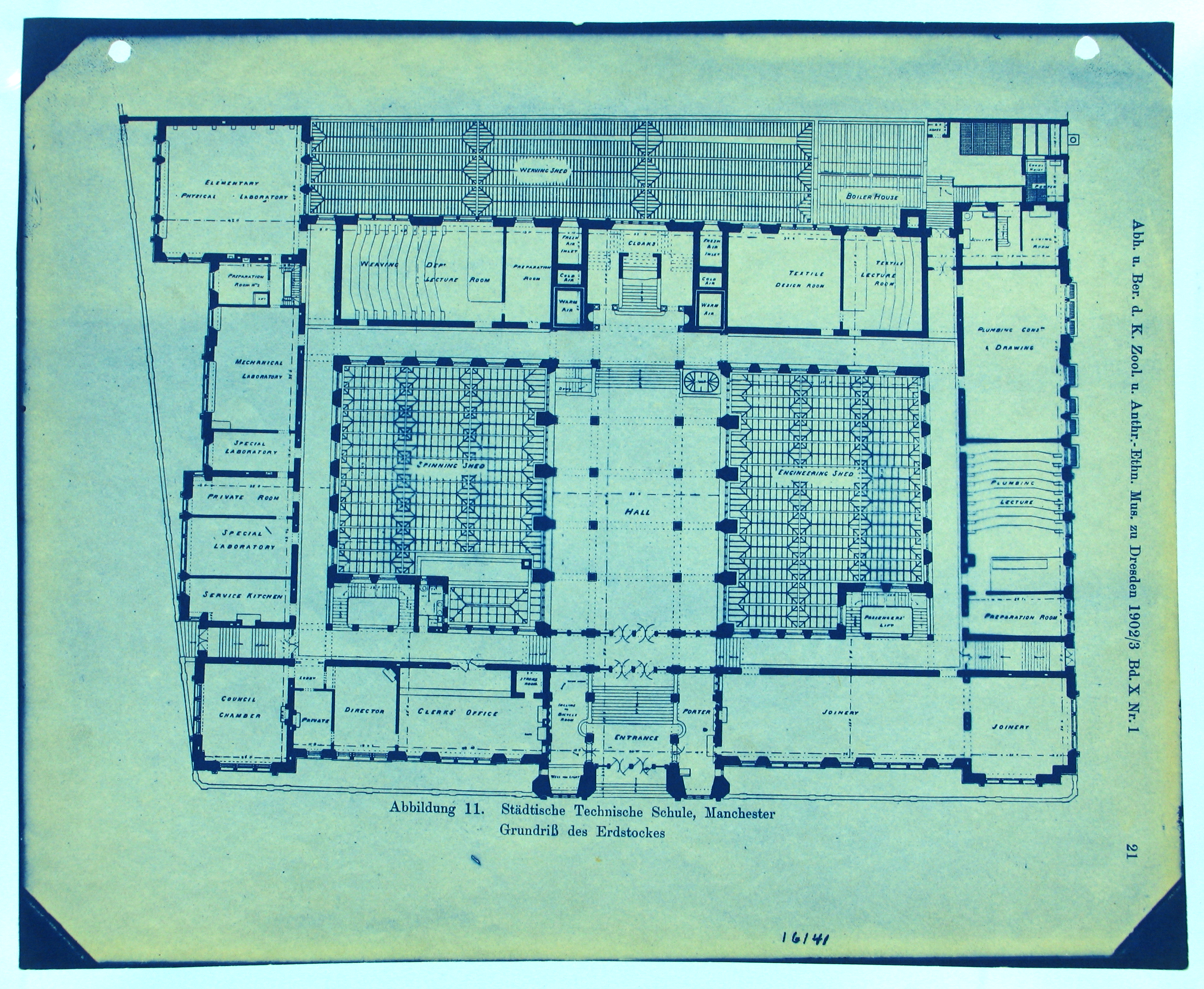
Ground floor plan (published by the State Museum of Zoology in Dresden 1902/3)

The building is bounded by Whitworth Street to the north, Granby Row to the south, Cobourg Street to the east, and Sackville Street to the west, where the original main entrance (called the Grand Entrance) was situated. The entrance on Granby Row was the usual entrance to the eastern part of the building (there was another entrance on Whitworth Street only for the use of the students and staff of the University of Manchester). The lower floors contained among other departments the Royce Laboratory for mechanical engineering, named after Henry Royce. Floors were denoted by letters, from BA (lowest), then A to L (highest) missing out I.

The historic Godlee Observatory was located on the roof until its closure in November 2022. The building was used by the university for a number of functions and departments. These included administration, teaching and research in science and technology, and examinations.

Inside on floors D, E and F was the Joule Library and various offices, laboratories, lecture theatres and exam halls. The Joule Library was given this name (commemorating the physicist J. P. Joule) in 1987 when it was refurbished. The library finally closed in June 2022.

There are inscriptions at the Grand Entrance and at the Whitworth Street entrance, recording important events in the history of the building. The later part of the building was built on the site of St Augustine's Church, the third Roman Catholic chapel in Manchester. It was replaced by the second St Augustine's Church in York Street, Chorlton on Medlock. There is also a plaque recording the previous existence of Ivan Levinstein's laboratory on the site.

The Sackville Street Building served as the home for the University of Manchester's school of Electrical and Electronic Engineering (EEE), until its move to the university's new engineering campus, the Nancy Rothwell Building in 2022.

The estates strategy for 2010–2020 for the University of Manchester, stated that essentially all of the former UMIST campus, described as the "area north of the Mancunian Way", was to be disposed of. The fate of the former UMIST Main Building (Sackville Street Building) was not described.

In July 2023 the university announced the launch of a public consultation exercise for the new £1.7bn innovation district, named ID Manchester, to be developed on the UMIST campus, and to include the Sackville Street Building.

== Trivia ==
The chimney of the building had steel reinforcement bands installed by the steeplejack and television personality Fred Dibnah.

== See also ==
- Listed buildings in Manchester-M1
