= University of Manchester =

Public university in Manchester, England

- Coat of arms of the University of Manchester
- Latin: Universitas Mancuniensis
- Other name: Manchester University
- Motto: Latin: Cognitio, sapientia, humanitas
- Motto in English: Knowledge, Wisdom, Humanity
- Established: 2004 – The University of Manchester; Predecessor institutions: 1956 – UMIST (as university college; university 1994); 1904 – Victoria University of Manchester; 1880 – Victoria University; 1851 – Owens College; 1824 – Manchester Mechanics' Institute; 1824 – Royal School of Medicine and Surgery
- Academic affiliations: ACU; EUA; N8 Group; Russell Group; URA; Universities UK; Defence Universities Alliance
- Endowment: £248.7 million (2025)
- Budget: £1.424 billion (2024/25)
- Chair: Philippa Hird
- Chancellor: Nazir Afzal
- President and vice-chancellor: Duncan Ivison
- Academic staff: 5,515 (2024/25)
- Administrative staff: 6,810 (2024/25)
- Students: 46,305 (2024/25); 42,890 FTE (2024/25)
- Undergraduates: 30,565 (2024/25)
- Postgraduates: 15,735 (2024/25)
- Location: Manchester, England, UK; 53°27′58″N 2°13′55″W
- Campus: Urban and suburban
Scarf
- Colours: Manchester Purple; Manchester Yellow
- Website: manchester.ac.uk

The University of Manchester is a public research university in Manchester, England, with its main campus south of the city centre on Oxford Road. It is a red brick university, a product of the civic university movement of the late 19th century. The current institution was formed in 2004 through the merger of the University of Manchester Institute of Science and Technology (UMIST) and the Victoria University of Manchester. This merger followed a century of close collaboration between the two institutions.

UMIST traced its origins to the Manchester Mechanics' Institution, founded in 1824. The present University of Manchester regards this date, alongside that of the foundation of the ancestor of the Royal School of Medicine and Surgery—one of the predecessor institutions of the Victoria University of Manchester—as its official foundation year. The founders of the Mechanics' Institution believed that all professions depended, to some extent, on scientific principles. The institute therefore taught working individuals those branches of science relevant to their existing occupations, in the belief that practical application would encourage innovation and advancement within those fields. The Victoria University of Manchester was founded in 1851 as Owens College. Academic research undertaken by the university has been published via the Manchester University Press since 1904.

Manchester is the third-largest university in the United Kingdom by total enrolment and receives over 92,000 undergraduate applications per year, making it the most popular university in the UK by volume of applications. The University of Manchester is a member of the Russell Group, the N8 Group, and the US-based Universities Research Association. The university additionally owns and operates major cultural assets such as the Manchester Museum, the Whitworth art gallery, the John Rylands Library, the Tabley House Collection and the Jodrell Bank Observatory, a UNESCO World Heritage Site. The university and its predecessor institutions have had 26 Nobel laureates among their past and present students and staff.

== History ==
=== Origins (1824 to 2004) ===
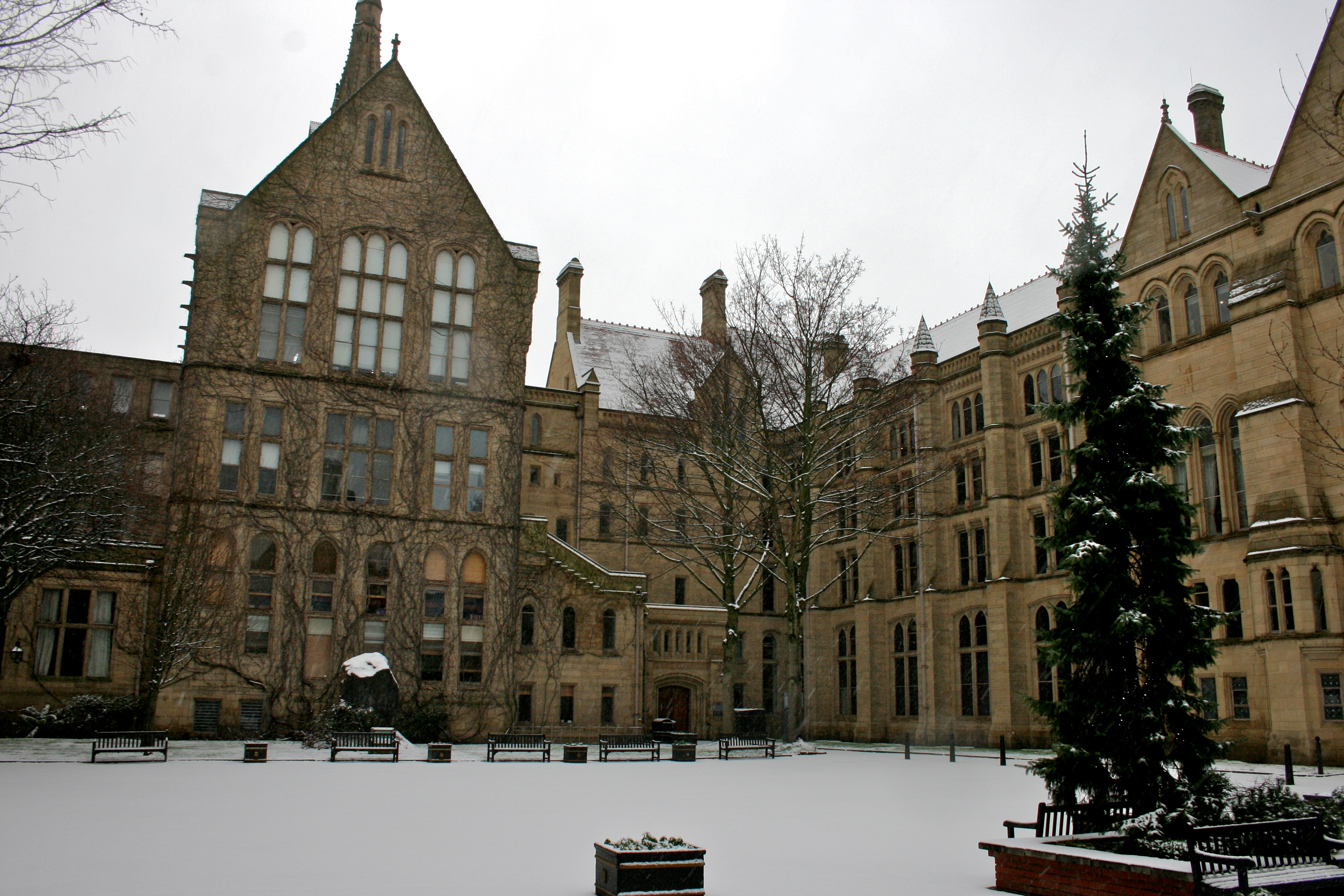
The Old Quadrangle at the University of Manchester's main campus on Oxford Road

The University of Manchester traces its origins to the formation of the Mechanics' Institution in 1824, the distant precursor of UMIST, and its heritage is intertwined with Manchester's identity as the world's first industrial city. The English chemist John Dalton, together with Manchester businessmen and industrialists, founded the institution to ensure that workers might learn the basic principles of science.

John Owens, a textile merchant, left a bequest of £96,942 in 1846 (equivalent to some £5.6 million in 2005 prices) to establish a college for the education of men on non-sectarian lines. His trustees founded Owens College in 1851 on a site at the corner of Quay Street and Byrom Street that had once been the home of the philanthropist Richard Cobden and later housed Manchester County Court. The locomotive designer Charles Beyer served as a governor of the college and became its most generous single donor to the extension fund, which raised the capital for the move to a new site and the construction of the main building now known as the John Owens Building. He also campaigned for and helped to fund the chair of engineering, the first applied science department in the north of England. His bequest to the college in 1876, a time of acute financial difficulty, was equivalent to £10 million. Beyer met the entire cost of constructing the Beyer Building to house the biology and geology departments, and his will also endowed chairs in engineering and the Beyer Professorship of Applied Mathematics.

The university possesses a strong German intellectual heritage. The Owens College Extension Movement formulated its plans following a tour of predominantly German universities and polytechnics. Thomas Ashton, a Manchester mill owner and chairman of the extension movement, had studied at Heidelberg University. Sir Henry Roscoe also studied at Heidelberg, under Robert Bunsen, and the two collaborated on research projects for many years. Roscoe championed the German model of research-led teaching that later became the template for the red-brick universities. Charles Beyer had studied at the Dresden Academy Polytechnic. Germans featured prominently on the staff, among them Carl Schorlemmer, Britain's first professor of organic chemistry, and Arthur Schuster, professor of physics. A German church also stood nearby on what is now part of the campus (this church was acquired by the university in 1949 and at a later date became the Stephen Joseph Studio).

In 1873, Owens College moved to new buildings on Oxford Road (then called Oxford Street) in Chorlton-on-Medlock, and from 1880 it was a constituent college of the federal Victoria University. This university, which received its royal charter in 1880, became England's first civic university. Following the independence of Liverpool and Leeds, it was renamed the Victoria University of Manchester in 1903 and absorbed Owens College the following year.

By 1905, the two institutions were substantial and dynamic forces. The Municipal College of Technology, the forerunner of UMIST, functioned both as the Victoria University of Manchester's Faculty of Technology and, in parallel, as a technical college offering advanced courses of study. Although UMIST achieved independent university status in 1955, the two institutions continued to work together. During the late twentieth century, however, formal ties diminished, and in 1994 new legislation enabled UMIST to become a separate university with its own degree-awarding powers. A decade later, the process was reversed. In March 2003, the Victoria University of Manchester and the University of Manchester Institute of Science and Technology agreed to merge into a single institution.

Prior to the merger, the Victoria University of Manchester and UMIST could together count 23 Nobel laureates among their former staff and students, with two more being added subsequently. Manchester has traditionally been strong in the sciences: it was here that Ernest Rutherford established the nuclear structure of the atom, and the world's first electronic stored-program computer was built at the university. Notable scientists associated with the university include the physicists Ernest Rutherford, Osborne Reynolds, Niels Bohr, James Chadwick, Arthur Schuster, Hans Geiger, Ernest Marsden and Balfour Stewart. Contributions to mathematics were made by Paul Erdős, Horace Lamb and Alan Turing. The university's heritage in the humanities and social sciences is at least equally distinguished. Major figures include the economists William Stanley Jevons and Sir Arthur Lewis; the philosophers Samuel Alexander, Dorothy Emmet and Alasdair MacIntyre; the historians Thomas Tout, Sir Lewis Namier and A. J. P. Taylor; the French scholar Eugène Vinaver; and the Latinist James Noel Adams. Michael Polanyi, one of the great polymaths of the twentieth century, held the chair of physical chemistry for fifteen years before moving to a specially created chair in social studies. The author Anthony Burgess, the Pritzker- and Stirling Prize-winning architect Norman Foster, and the composer Peter Maxwell Davies all studied or worked at Manchester.

=== Post-merger (2004 to present) ===
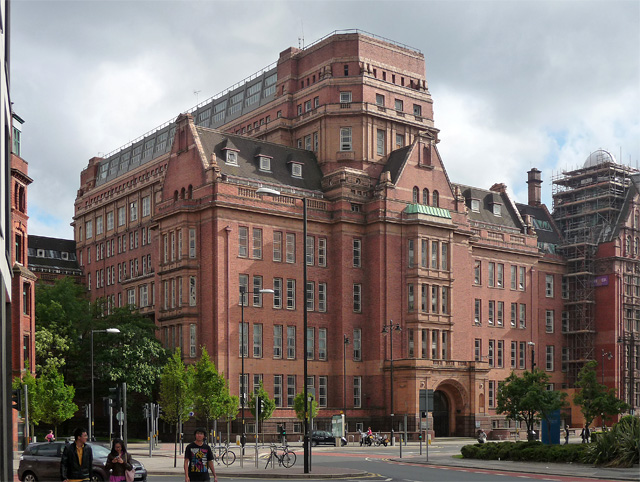
The Sackville Street Building, formerly the UMIST Main Building

The current University of Manchester was officially launched on 1 October 2004, when Queen Elizabeth II bestowed its royal charter. It was named the Sunday Times University of the Year in 2006, having won the inaugural Times Higher Education University of the Year award in 2005.

The founding president and vice-chancellor of the new university was Alan Gilbert, formerly vice-chancellor of the University of Melbourne, who retired at the end of the 2009–2010 academic year. His successor was Dame Nancy Rothwell, who had held a chair in physiology at the university since 1994. Rothwell served as vice‑chancellor from 2010 to 2024 before being succeeded by Duncan Ivison. The Nancy Rothwell Building was named in her honour. One of the university's stated aims in the Manchester 2015 Agenda was to rank among the top 25 universities worldwide, building on Alan Gilbert's vision of establishing it "by 2015 among the 25 strongest research universities in the world on commonly accepted criteria of research excellence and performance". In 2011, four Nobel laureates were on its staff: Andre Geim, Konstantin Novoselov, Sir John Sulston and Joseph E. Stiglitz.

In February 2012, the Engineering and Physical Sciences Research Council (EPSRC) announced the formation of the National Graphene Institute. The University of Manchester was the "single supplier invited to submit a proposal for funding the new £45m institute, £38m of which will be provided by the government" – (EPSRC & Technology Strategy Board). In 2013, an additional £23 million of funding from the European Regional Development Fund brought the total investment to £61 million.

In August 2012, it was announced that the university's Faculty of Engineering and Physical Sciences had been chosen as the hub of a new BP International Centre for Advanced Materials, part of a $100 million initiative to develop industry‑changing materials. The centre was intended to advance the fundamental understanding and application of materials across a range of oil and gas industrial uses, and was to be organised around a hub‑and‑spoke model, with the hub located at Manchester and the spokes based at the University of Cambridge, Imperial College London and the University of Illinois at Urbana–Champaign.

In 2020, the university experienced a series of student rent strikes and protests against its handling of the COVID‑19 pandemic, rent levels and living conditions in the halls of residence. The protests concluded with a negotiated reduction in rent.

In 2023, a second rent strike and student protest began, again opposing rent prices and living conditions in the halls of residence. The actions included occupations, marches and the withholding of rent by students in university accommodation. The university's response included deploying bailiffs to evict occupiers and bringing disciplinary proceedings against some of those involved. Despite a student outcry that included a referendum in which 97 per cent of participants voted for the university to lower rents, the university increased rent prices the following year. Some university‑owned accommodation rose in price by as much as 10 per cent compared with the previous year.

== Campus ==
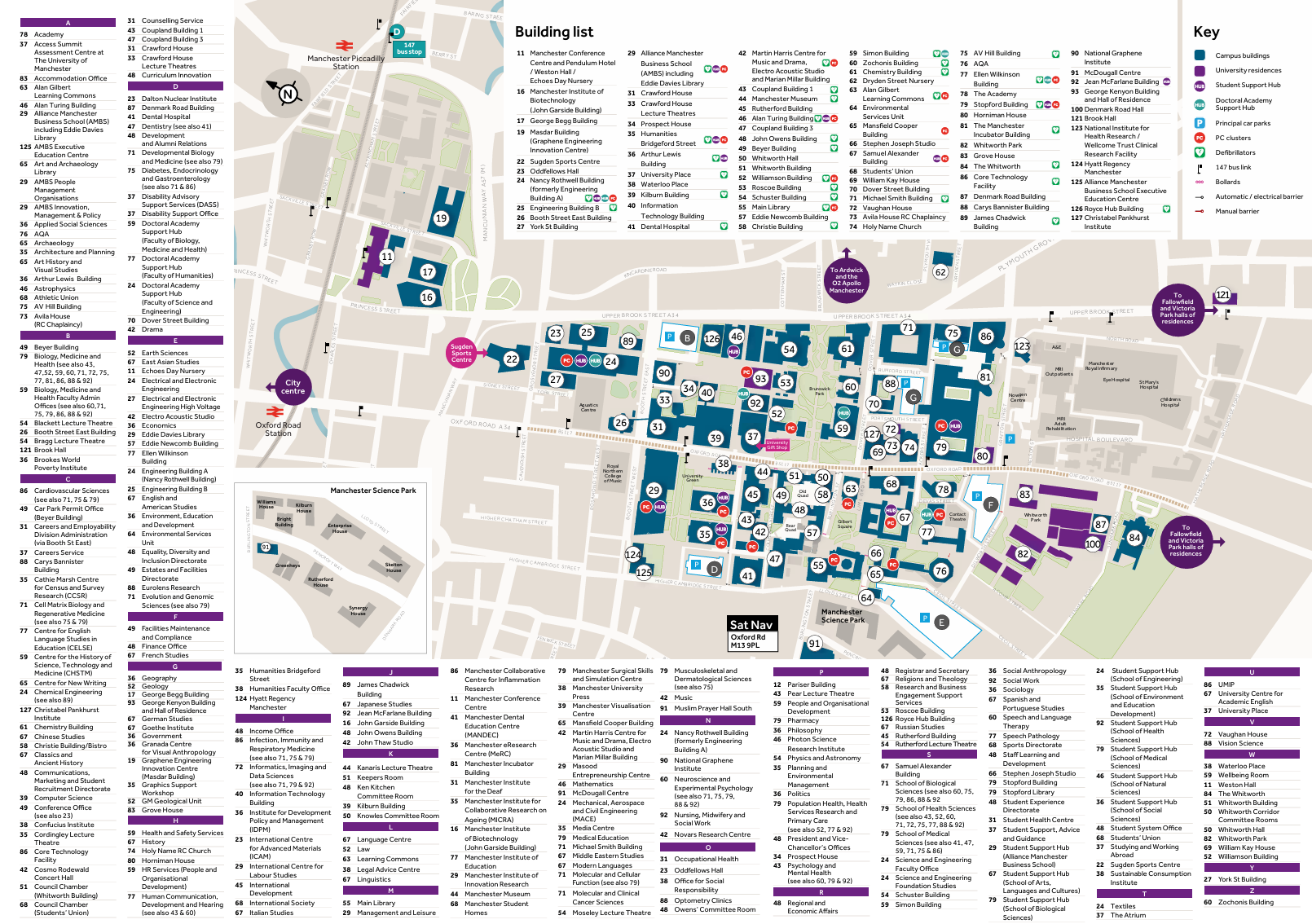
A 2025 map of the university campus, with all buildings labelled

The university’s main site contains most of its facilities and is often referred to as the campus; however, Manchester is not a campus university in the commonly understood sense. It is situated in the heart of the city, and its buildings are woven into the urban fabric of Manchester, interspersed with non‑university buildings and major thoroughfares.

The campus falls into two parts:

- the North Campus, or Sackville Street Campus, centred on Sackville Street
- the South Campus, or Oxford Road Campus, centred on Oxford Road

Student accommodation is spread across three residential campuses: the City Campus, adjacent to the academic departments; the Fallowfield Campus, roughly 2 miles (3.2 km) south of the main site; and the Victoria Park Campus, which lies between the City and Fallowfield campuses.

By 2025 the greater part of the former North Campus had been relocated to the Oxford Road Campus, and the Sackville Street site now houses the SISTER regeneration area (formerly ID Manchester). This is a joint venture between Bruntwood SciTech and the University of Manchester, intended to become a £1.7 billion innovation district and a new city‑centre neighbourhood. The Manchester City Council Strategic Regeneration Framework for the site was approved in 2017 and updated in 2023.

=== Old Quadrangle ===
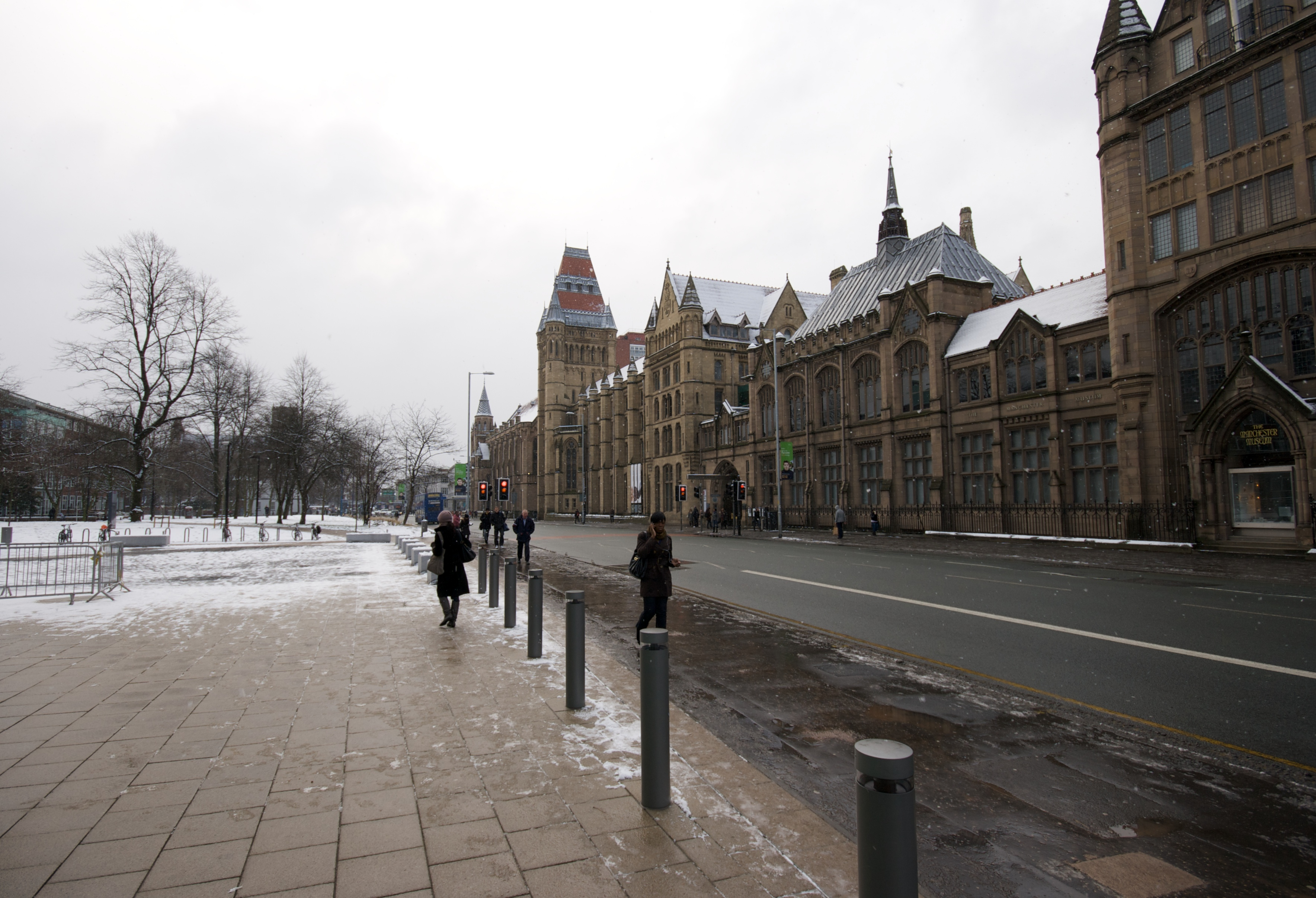
The buildings of the University of Manchester and the Manchester Museum in Oxford Road

The buildings that surround the Old Quadrangle date from the period of Owens College and were designed in a Gothic style by Alfred Waterhouse. The John Owens Building (1873), originally called the Main Building, was the first to be completed; the remaining structures were added over the following thirty years. These include the Beyer Building (1887), the Manchester Museum (1887), the Christie Library (1898) and Whitworth Hall (1902), where the university holds its graduation ceremonies.

=== Other notable buildings ===
The University of Manchester estate includes over 30 listed buildings. In addition to the buildings that form the Old Quadrangle, other notable structures on the Oxford Road Campus include the Stephen Joseph Studio, a former German Protestant church, and the Samuel Alexander Building, a grade II listed building erected in 1919 that now houses the School of Arts, Languages and Cultures.

Notable buildings on the Sackville Street Campus include the Sackville Street Building, formerly the UMIST Main Building, which was opened in 1902 by the then Prime Minister, Arthur Balfour. Constructed of Burmantofts terracotta, the building is now Grade II listed. It was extended along Whitworth Street, towards London Road, between 1927 and 1957 by the architects Bradshaw Gass & Hope; the completion of the work was delayed by the economic depression of the 1930s and the Second World War.

=== Cultural institutions ===
The university's Jodrell Bank Observatory in Cheshire is a World Heritage Site and houses the 76‑m Lovell Telescope. Other cultural institutions belonging to the university include the John Rylands Research Institute and Library, the Whitworth art gallery and the Manchester Museum. The special collections held at the John Rylands Library, together with the entire collections of the Whitworth and the Manchester Museum, are designated under the Arts Council England Designation Scheme as being among the "pre‑eminent collections held in museums, libraries and archives across England".

== Organisation and administration ==
=== Faculties and schools ===
The University of Manchester is divided into three faculties: Biology, Medicine and Health; Science and Engineering; and Humanities.

==== Faculty of Biology, Medicine and Health ====
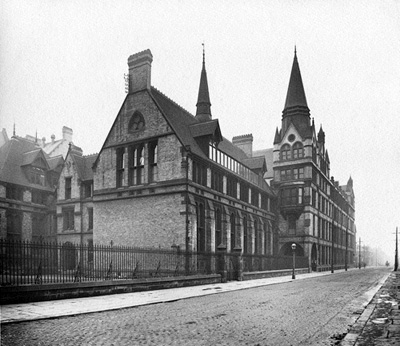
Old Medical School on Coupland Street (photographed in 1908), which now houses the School of Dentistry

The faculty is composed of the School of Biological Sciences, the School of Medical Sciences and the School of Health Sciences.

Biological sciences have been taught at Manchester since the founding of Owens College in 1851. At UMIST, biological teaching and research commenced in 1959 with the establishment of a biochemistry department. The present school, though unitary for teaching purposes, is divided into a number of separate sections for research.

The medical college was founded in 1874 and is one of the largest in the country, training more than 400 medical students in each clinical year and over 350 in the pre‑clinical and phase‑1 years. The university is a founding partner of the Manchester Academic Health Science Centre, established to focus high‑end healthcare research in Greater Manchester.

A department of pharmacy was established at the university in 1883, and in 1904 Manchester became the first British university to offer an honours degree in the subject. The School of Pharmacy maintains close links with Manchester Royal Infirmary, UHSM/Wythenshawe and Salford Royal (formerly Hope Hospital), which provide undergraduate students with hospital‑based experience.

The School of Psychological Sciences was one of the five schools that made up the Faculty of Medical and Human Sciences. The Victoria University of Manchester was the first university in Britain to appoint a full‑time Professor of Psychology, doing so in 1919. When the present University of Manchester was formed in 2004, the school brought together the Human Communication and Deafness Group (HCD), which had been part of the Department of Psychology, and the Division of Clinical Psychology. The school was divided into three divisions: Psychology, Clinical Psychology, and Audiology and Deafness. T. H. Pear held the Chair of Psychology from 1919 to 1951.

==== Faculty of Science and Engineering ====
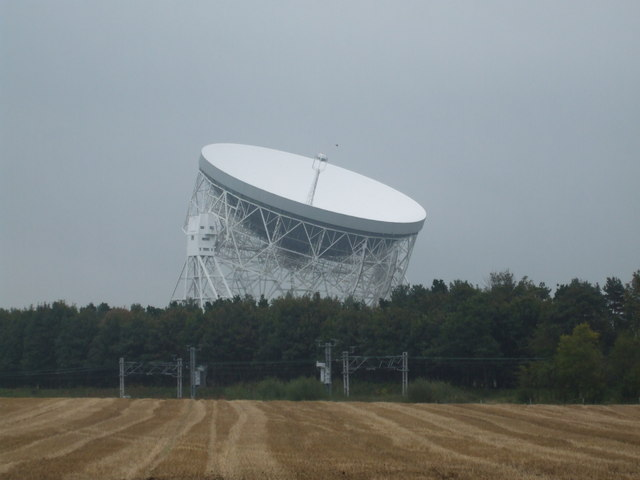
The Grade I listed Lovell Telescope at Jodrell Bank Observatory

The Faculty of Science and Engineering is divided into two schools. The School of Engineering comprises the departments of chemical engineering and analytical science, computer science, electrical and electronic engineering and mechanical, aerospace and civil engineering. The School of Natural Sciences consists of the departments of chemistry, earth and environmental sciences, physics and astronomy, materials and mathematics.

The Jodrell Bank Centre for Astrophysics brings together the university's astronomy staff in Manchester and the Jodrell Bank Observatory, which occupies rural land near Goostrey, some ten miles (16 km) west of Macclesfield. The observatory's Lovell Telescope is named after Sir Bernard Lovell, a professor at the Victoria University of Manchester who first proposed its construction. Built in the 1950s, it is the third‑largest fully steerable radio telescope in the world.

==== Faculty of Humanities ====
The Faculty of Humanities comprises four schools:

- The School of Arts, Languages and Cultures (SALC), which includes Archaeology, Art History and Visual Studies, Classics and Ancient History, Drama, English and American Studies, History, Linguistics, Modern Languages, Museology, Music, Religions and Theology, and the University Language Centre.
- The School of Environment, Education and Development (SEED), which includes Geography, Development, Planning, Property, Environmental Management, the Manchester Institute of Education, and the Manchester School of Architecture, the last of which is administered jointly with Manchester Metropolitan University.
- The School of Social Sciences (SoSS), which includes Law, Criminology, Economics, Politics, Sociology, Philosophy, Social Anthropology and Social Statistics.
- Alliance Manchester Business School

The faculty also houses a number of research institutes: the Centre for New Writing, the Institute for Social Change, the Brooks World Poverty Institute, the Humanitarian and Conflict Response Institute, the Manchester Institute for Innovation Research, the Research Institute for Cosmopolitan Cultures, the Centre for Chinese Studies, the Institute for Development Policy and Management, the Centre for Equity in Education and the Sustainable Consumption Institute.

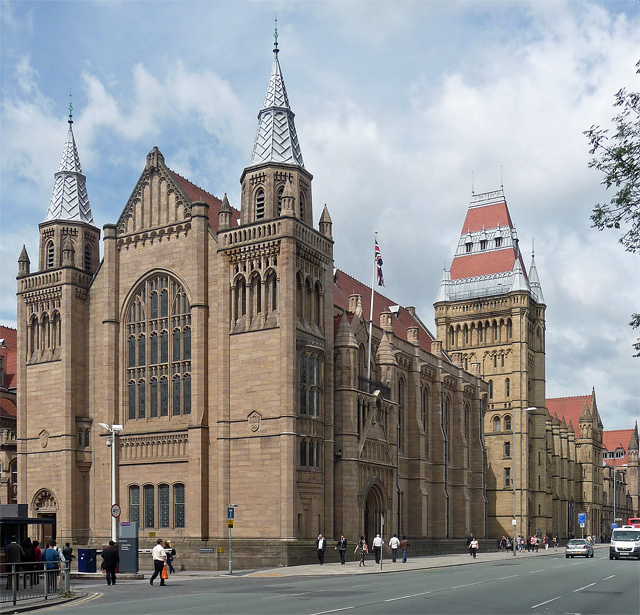
The university's Whitworth Hall

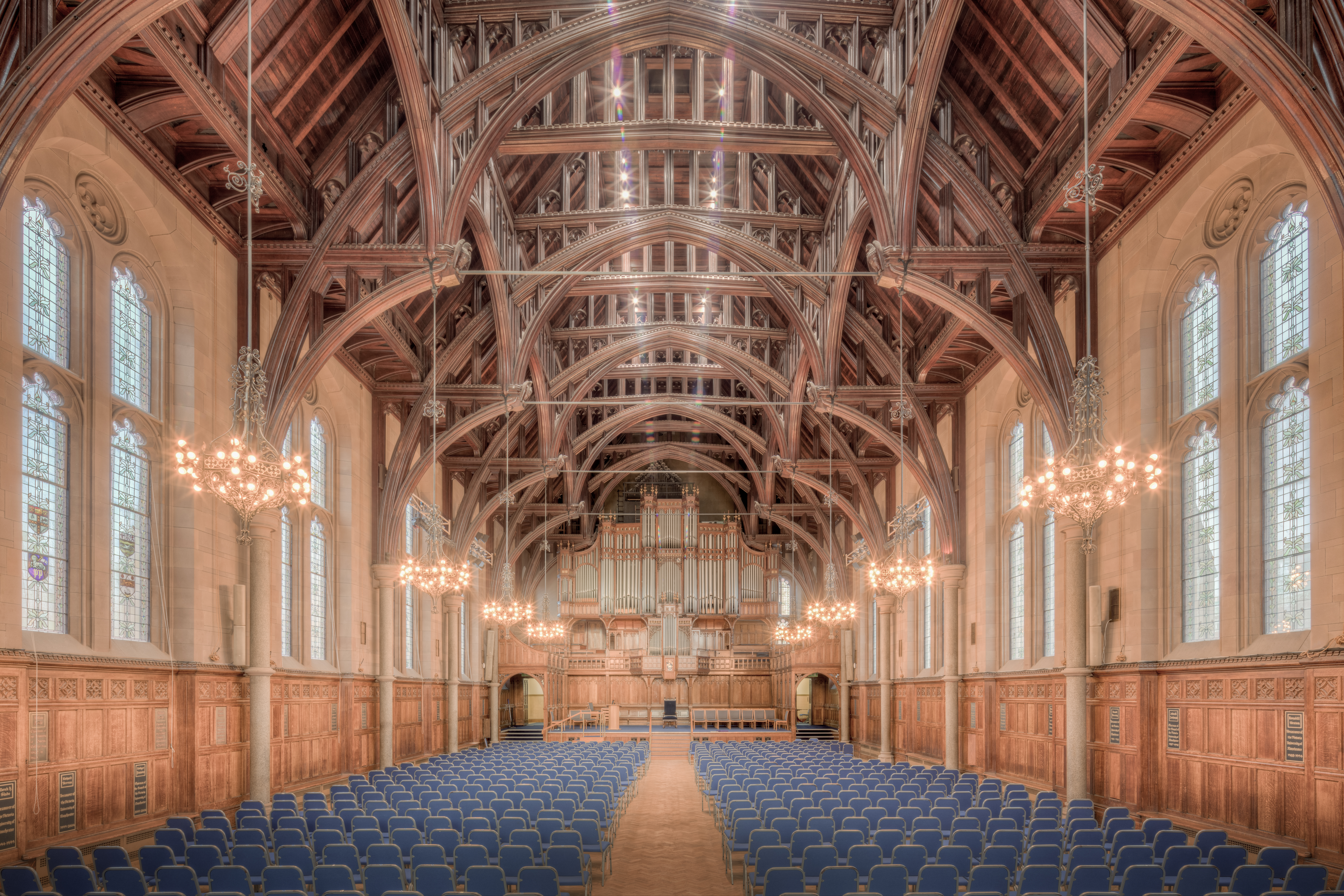
Whitworth Hall interior

=== Professional services ===
A number of professional services, organised as directorates, support the university. These include the Directorates of Compliance and Risk, Estates and Facilities, Finance, Planning, Human Resources, IT Services, and Legal Affairs, as well as the Board Secretariat and Governance Office, the Directorate of Research and Business Engagement, the Directorate for the Student Experience, the Division of Communications and Marketing, the Division of Development and Alumni Relations, the Office for Social Responsibility and the University Library. Professional services staff are also embedded within the faculty structure, in roles such as technician and experimental officer.

Each directorate reports to the Registrar, Secretary and Chief Operating Officer, who in turn reports to the President of the university. A Director of Faculty Operations sits within each faculty, overseeing support for these areas.

=== Finances ===
In the financial year ending 31 July 2024, the University of Manchester recorded a total income of £1.365 billion (2022/23 – £1.346 billion) and total expenditure of £1.025 billion (2022/23 – £1.239 billion). Key sources of income included £714.3 million from tuition fees and education contracts (2022/23 – £659.9 million), £151.0 million from funding body grants (2022/23 – £184.2 million), £287.9 million from research grants and contracts (2022/23 – £271.1 million), £31.2 million from investment income (2022/23 – £17.4 million) and £8.3 million from donations and endowments (2022/23 – £18.6 million).

At the year end, Manchester had endowments of £240.2 million (2023 – £221.6 million) and total net assets of £2.215 billion (2023 – £1.870 billion). It has the seventh‑largest endowment of any university in the UK.

== Academic profile ==
The University of Manchester is the 3rd largest university in the United Kingdom, after the Open University and University College London. It attracts international students from 160 countries worldwide.

Among the university's most prominent current academics are the computer scientist Steve Furber; the novelist Jeanette Winterson; and the physicist Brian Cox.

=== Research ===
The University of Manchester is a major centre for research and a member of the Russell Group of leading British research universities. In the 2021 Research Excellence Framework, the university was ranked fifth in the United Kingdom for research power and eighth for the grade point average quality of staff submitted among multi‑faculty institutions, placing tenth when specialist institutions were included. In the 2014 Research Excellence Framework, it had been ranked fifth for research power and fifteenth for the grade point average quality of staff submitted among multi‑faculty institutions, a position that fell to seventeenth when specialist institutions were taken into account. Manchester has the sixth‑largest research income of any English university, behind Oxford, University College London (UCL), Cambridge, Imperial and King's College London, and has been informally described as forming part of a "golden diamond" of research‑intensive UK institutions, a grouping that adds Manchester to the Oxford–Cambridge–London "Golden Triangle".

The university has a strong track record in securing funding from the three principal UK research councils. It is ranked fifth by the EPSRC, seventh by the Medical Research Council (MRC), and first by the Biotechnology and Biological Sciences Research Council (BBSRC). It is also one of the wealthiest universities in the UK in terms of income and interest from endowments; an estimate made in 2008 placed it third, exceeded only by Oxford and Cambridge.

The University of Manchester attracts the highest level of research income from UK industry of any institution in the country. Data published by the Higher Education Statistics Agency (HESA) show that in 2016–2017 the university received £24,831,000 in research funding from UK industry, commerce and public corporations.

Historically, Manchester has been associated with high scientific achievement: across the university and its constituent former institutions there are 25 Nobel laureates among past and current students and staff, the fourth highest number of any single university in the United Kingdom (after Oxford, Cambridge and UCL) and the ninth highest in Europe. Two of the top ten discoveries made by university academics and researchers—the first working computer and the contraceptive pill—were also made at Manchester, according to an academic poll. The Langworthy Professorship, an endowed chair in the Department of Physics and Astronomy, has been held by a succession of academic luminaries, among them Ernest Rutherford (1907–19), Lawrence Bragg (1919–37), Patrick Blackett (1937–53) and, more recently, Konstantin Novoselov—all of whom received the Nobel Prize. In 2013 Andre Geim was appointed to the Regius Professorship in Physics, the only chair of its kind in the United Kingdom.

The university has established joint research funds with a number of leading international institutions to support collaborative research. Between 2021 and 2023, for example, it partnered with the KTH Royal Institute of Technology, Stockholm University and Tel Aviv University on research projects in medicine, biology, the natural sciences and engineering.

The partnership with Tel Aviv University has generated controversy within the student body because of the university's alleged involvement in the Gaza war. A vote in the Students' Union returned a 94 per cent majority in favour of a policy to terminate the partnership. The university's decision to disregard the vote and maintain the link has prompted multiple student protests.

=== Libraries ===
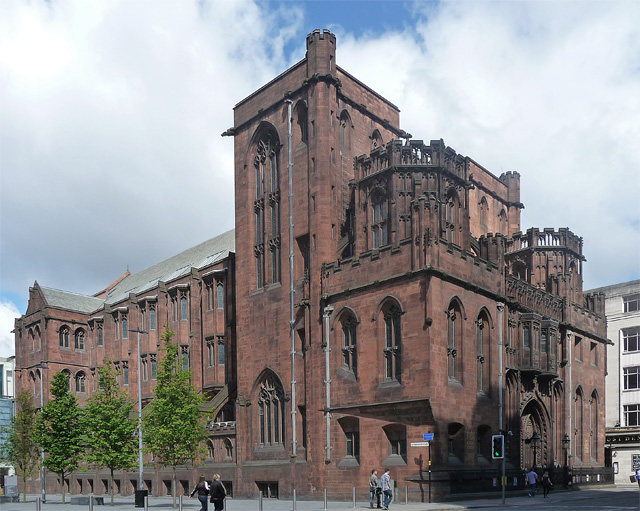
The Grade-I listed John Rylands Library on Deansgate

The University of Manchester Library is the largest non‑legal deposit library in the United Kingdom, and the third‑largest academic library after those of Oxford and Cambridge. It holds the largest collection of electronic resources of any library in the UK.

The John Rylands Library, founded in memory of John Rylands by his wife Enriqueta Augustina Rylands as an independent institution, occupies a Victorian Gothic building on Deansgate in the city centre. Its holdings include a major collection of historic books and other printed materials, manuscripts, archives and papyri. The papyri, written in ancient languages, contain the oldest extant New Testament document, Rylands Library Papyrus P52, commonly known as the St John Fragment. The Deansgate site reopened to readers and the public in April 2007 following extensive improvements and renovations, which included the construction of a new wing and the pitched roof that had originally been intended.

=== Collections ===
==== Manchester Museum ====
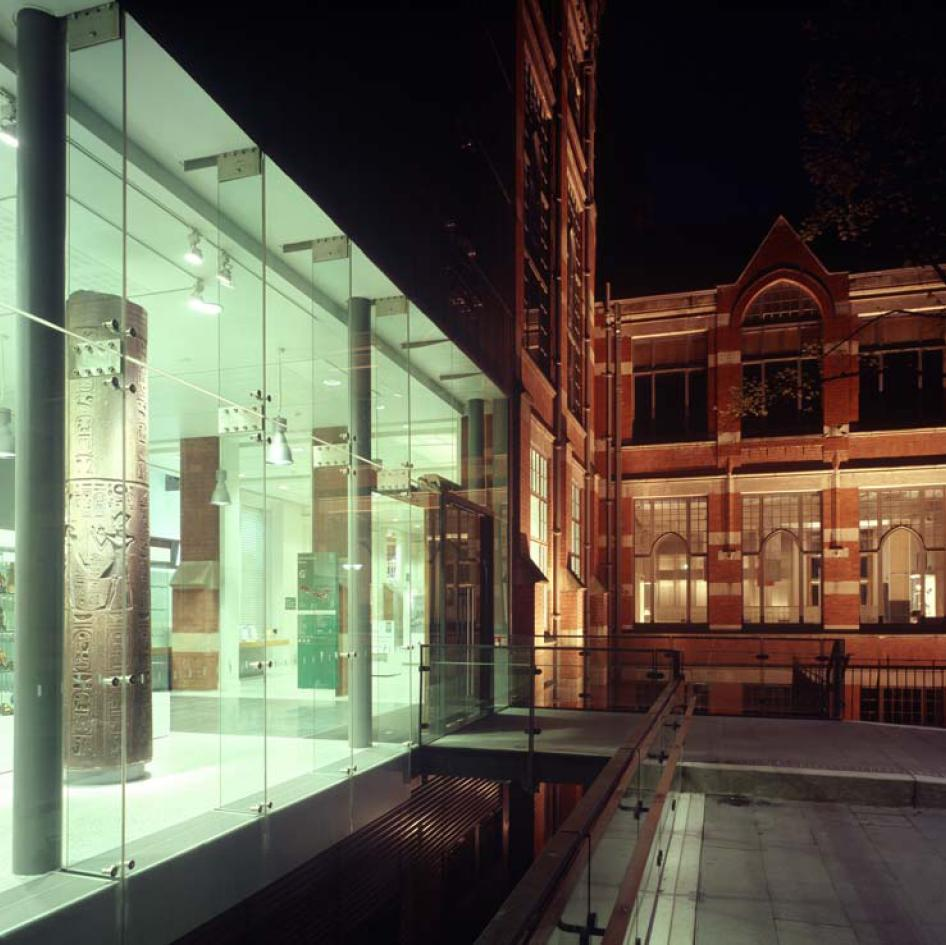
The entrance to the Manchester Museum

The Manchester Museum holds nearly 4.25 million items drawn from many parts of the world. The collections include butterflies and carvings from India, birds and bark‑cloth from the Pacific, live frogs and ancient pottery from the Americas, fossils and Aboriginal art from Australia, mammals and ancient Egyptian craftsmanship from Africa, plants, coins and minerals from Europe, art from the civilisations of the ancient Mediterranean, and beetles, armour and archery from Asia. In November 2004, the museum acquired a cast of a fossilised Tyrannosaurus rex called "Stan".

The museum’s first collections were assembled in 1821 by the Manchester Society of Natural History, and were later enlarged by the addition of the collections of the Manchester Geological Society. Owing to the society’s financial difficulties, and on the advice of the evolutionary biologist Thomas Huxley, Owens College assumed responsibility for the collections in 1867. The college commissioned Alfred Waterhouse, the architect of London’s Natural History Museum, to design a museum on a site in Oxford Road that would house the collections for the benefit of both students and the public. The Manchester Museum opened to the public in 1888.

==== Whitworth Art Gallery ====
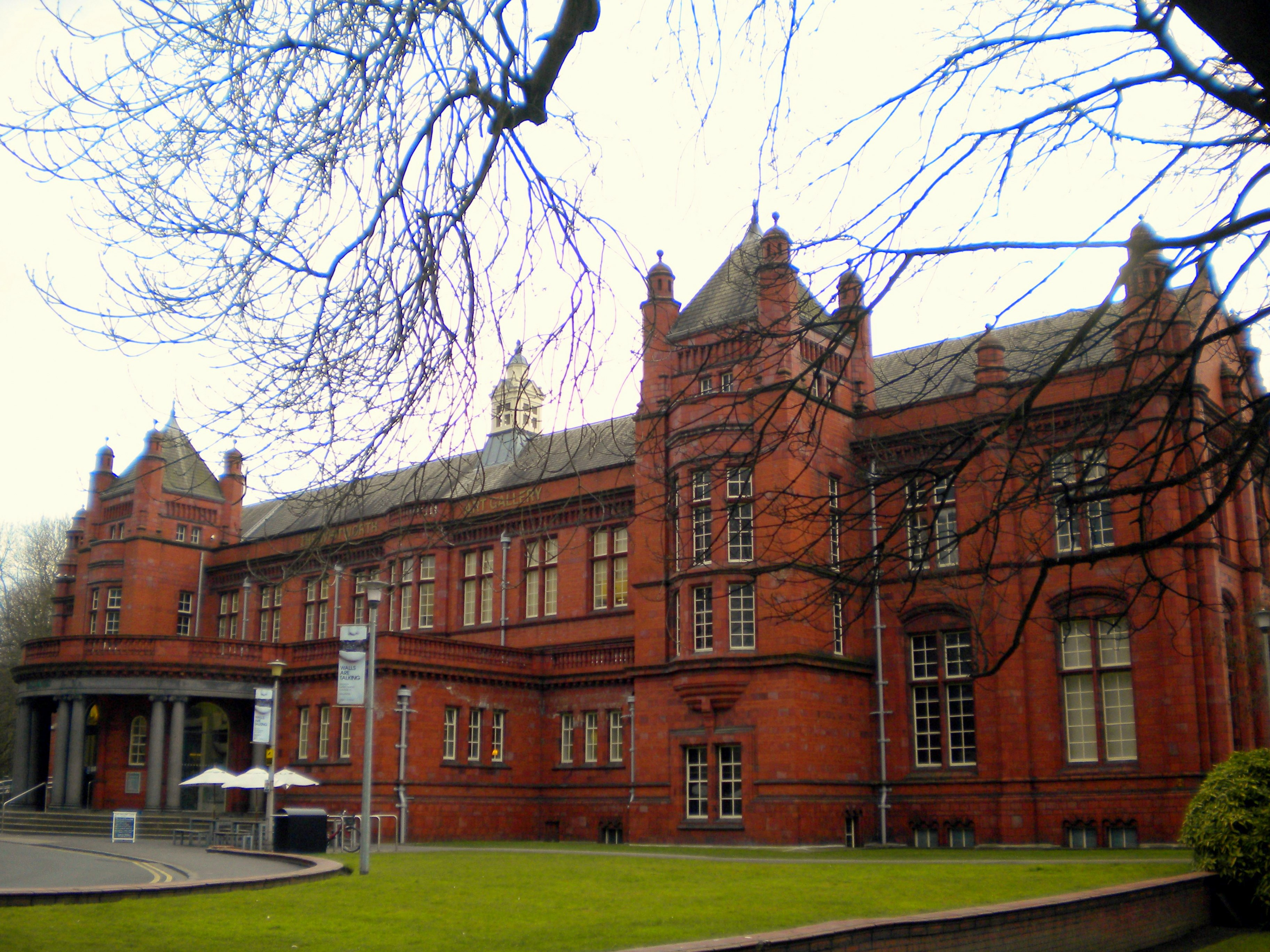
The Whitworth Art Gallery

The Whitworth Art Gallery houses collections of internationally renowned British watercolours, textiles and wallpapers, together with modern and historic prints, drawings, paintings and sculpture. Its holdings comprise 31,000 items. A programme of temporary exhibitions runs throughout the year, and the Mezzanine Court is devoted to the display of sculpture.

The gallery was founded by Robert Darbishire with a donation from Sir Joseph Whitworth in 1889, as The Whitworth Institute and Park. In 1959, it became part of the Victoria University of Manchester. The Mezzanine Court, a sculpture court located in the centre of the building, opened in October 1995 and was awarded a RIBA regional prize.

=== Reputation and rankings ===
Rankings
National rankings
- Complete (2027): 24
- Guardian (2027): 20
- Times / Sunday Times (2027): 23

Global rankings
- ARWU (2026): 51
- QS (2027): 40
- THE (2026): 56

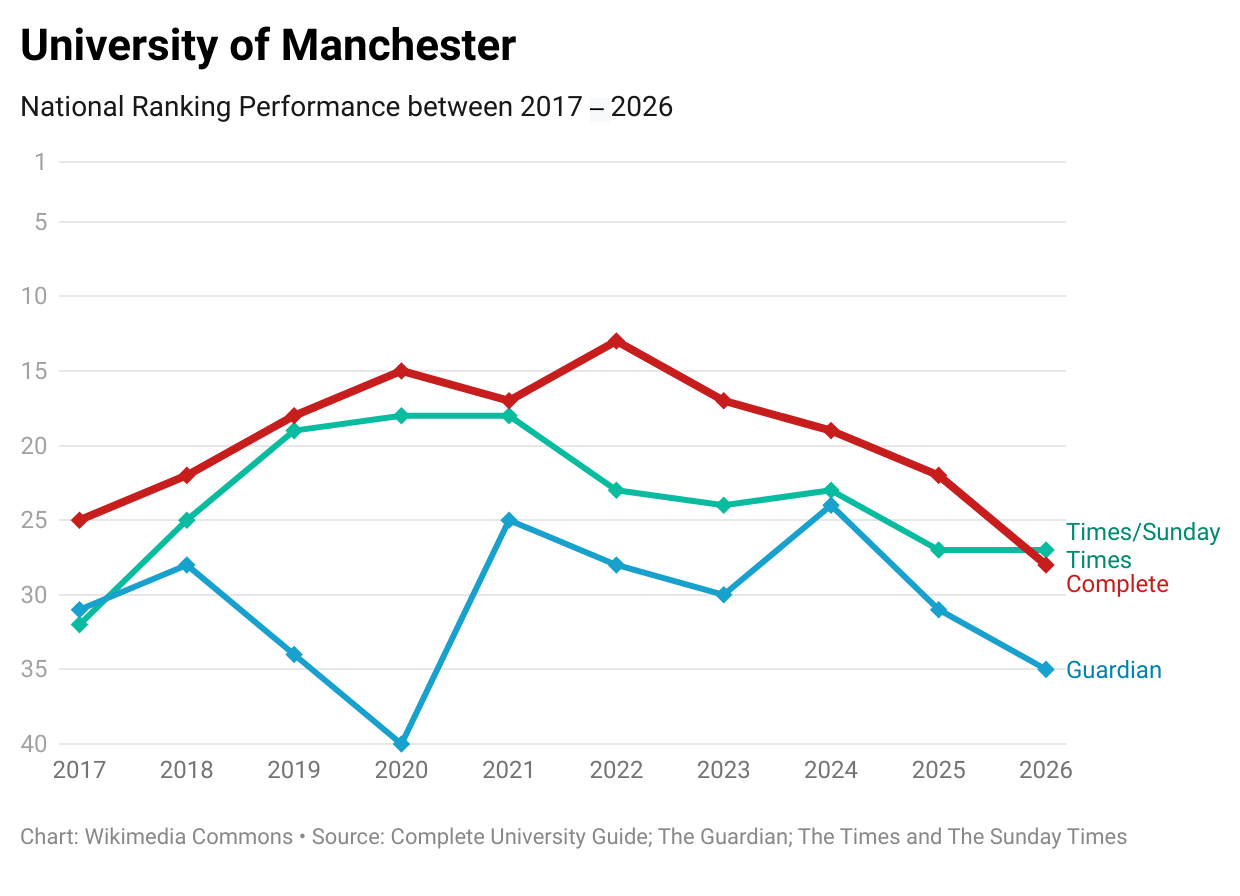
University of Manchester's national league table performance over the past ten years

The Sunday Times described Manchester in 2006 as possessing "a formidable reputation spanning most disciplines, but most notably in the life sciences, engineering, humanities, economics, sociology and the social sciences". Manchester was also honoured with an award for excellence and innovation in the arts at the Times Higher Education Awards 2010.

According to The Graduate Market in 2024, published by High Fliers Research, Manchester was the second most targeted university by the UK’s top 100 graduate employers in the 2023–24 recruitment cycle.

In the 2025–26 cycle, the University of Manchester was ranked 35th in the QS World University Rankings. In 2025, it was placed joint 53rd by Times Higher Education and 46th by the Shanghai Academic Ranking of World Universities. Nationally, the Complete University Guide ranked it 28th in 2025, while The Guardian placed it 36th and The Times 27th in 2026.

Luke Georgiou, then Deputy President and Deputy Vice‑Chancellor of Manchester, observed in 2022 that "the ranking tables, despite their limitations, give a consistent picture of the University of Manchester’s excellence in national and global terms".

=== Admissions ===
UCAS Admission Statistics
	2025	2024	2023	2022	2021
Applications (Note: Main scheme applications, International and UK)	99,610	92,500	93,450	92,310	88,330
Accepted	10,785	9,985	9,630	9,600	11,070
Applications/Accepted Ratio	9.2	9.3	9.7	9.6	8.0
Overall Offer Rate (%)	62.8	61.3	55.2	54.4	61.9
↳ UK only (%) (Note: UK domiciled applicants)	57.8	57.8	53.4	51.5	60.5
Average Entry Tariff	—N/a	—N/a	160	166	167
↳ Top three exams (Note: The maximum tariff score for three exams is 168: the equivalent of A*A*A* at A-Level, 777 at HL for the IB Diploma Programme, or AAA at Advanced Higher)	—N/a	—N/a	148.3	153.1	152.5

HESA Student Body Composition (2024/25)
Domicile and Ethnicity	Total
British White (Note: Not be confused solely with White British)	37%
British Ethnic Minorities (Note: Includes those who indicate that they identify as Asian, Black, Mixed Heritage, Arab or any other ethnicity except White.)	23%
International EU	2%
International Non-EU	38%
Undergraduate Widening Participation Indicators
Female	55%
Independent School	17%
Low Participation Areas (Note: Calculated from the Polar4 measure, using Quintile1, in England and Wales. Calculated from the Scottish Index of Multiple Deprivation (SIMD) measure, using SIMD20, in Scotland.)	9%

In the 2024/25 academic year, the student body consisted of 46,305 students, of whom 30,565 were undergraduates and 15,735 postgraduates. Manchester received just under 100,000 applications through the main UCAS scheme for undergraduate courses in 2025, making it the most applied‑to university in the United Kingdom. The university is consistently classed as a "high‑tariff" institution by the Department for Education; in recent years the average undergraduate entrant has amassed between 148 and 153 UCAS Tariff points in their best three pre‑university qualifications, the equivalent of AAA to A*AA at A‑level. Data on entry standards for 2022‑23 published by the HESA and used in domestic league tables—which encompass a wider range of qualifications than the top three examination grades—show that the average Manchester student attained 166 points, the twentieth‑highest figure in the country. The university extended offers of admission to 57.7 per cent of its UK‑domiciled undergraduate applicants in 2024.

In 2019–20, 15.7 per cent of Manchester's undergraduates had been privately educated, the twenty‑third highest proportion among mainstream British universities. In 2023–24, 18,660 of Manchester's 46,915 students (40 per cent) came from outside the United Kingdom; of these, 9,090 (49 per cent of the international cohort, 19 per cent of all students) were from China. Times Higher Education identified Manchester in 2023 as having the fifth highest proportion of international students from China of any mainstream university in the UK.

=== Manchester University Press ===
Manchester University Press is the university's academic publishing house. It publishes academic monographs, textbooks and journals, most of which are by authors based elsewhere in the international academic community, and is the third-largest university press in England, after Oxford University Press and Cambridge University Press.

== Student life ==
=== Students' Union ===
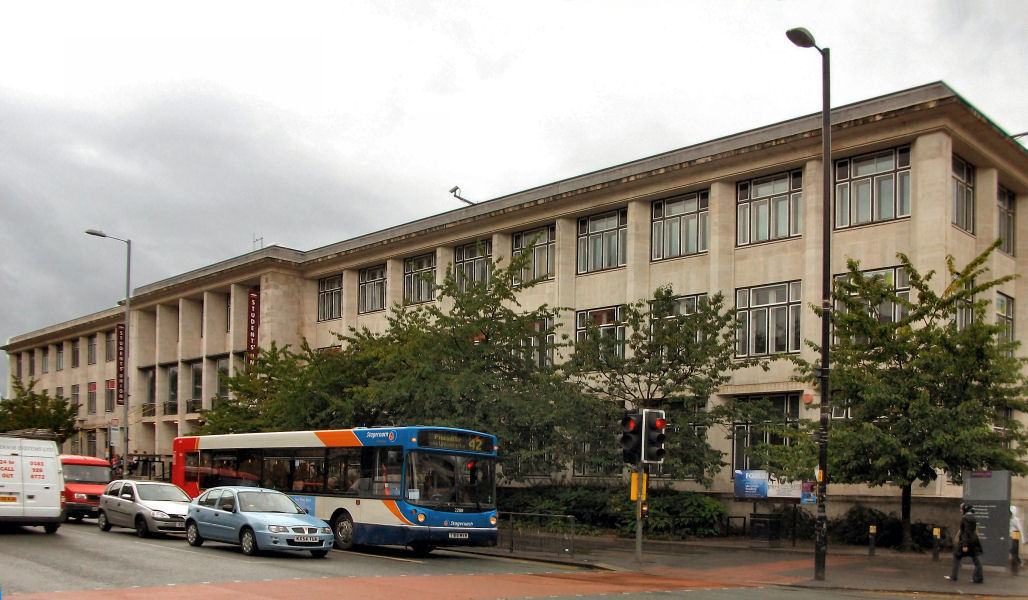
The Students' Union building on Oxford Road

The University of Manchester Students' Union is the representative body for students at the university and the largest students' union in the United Kingdom. It was formed through the merger of the UMIST Students' Association and the University of Manchester Union, following the amalgamation of their parent institutions, UMIST and the Victoria University of Manchester, on 1 October 2004.

Unlike many other students' unions in the UK, it does not have a president, but is instead led by an eight-member executive team whose members share joint responsibility.

=== Sport ===
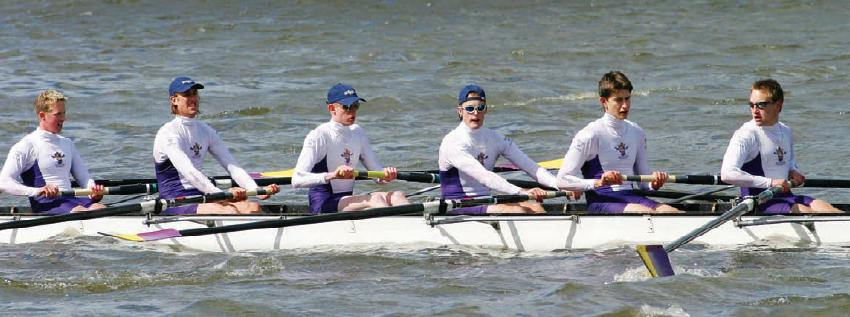
The Manchester University Boat Club is one of many Athletic Union clubs.

The Manchester University Boat Club blade

The University of Manchester runs its sports clubs through the athletics union, while student societies are administered by the Students' Union.

The university offers more than 80 health and fitness classes, and over 3,000 students are members of the 44 Athletic Union clubs. These clubs cover a wide range of levels and interests. Many of the more popular sports field several university and departmental teams that compete in internal leagues. Among the sports represented are badminton, lacrosse, korfball, dodgeball, field hockey, ice hockey, rugby league, rugby union, football, basketball, fencing, netball, squash, water polo, ultimate and cricket.

The athletic union was formed at Owens College in 1885 from four clubs: rugby, lacrosse, cricket and tennis. A separate women's athletic union was founded in 1901, and the two bodies were amalgamated in 1981. Following the acquisition of the Firs estate in Fallowfield, a sports ground and pavilion were established there. From 1940, the McDougall Centre on Burlington Street also served as a sports centre. Among former students who have achieved Olympic success are Ron Hill, Rowena Sweatman, James Hickman, Cyril Holmes and Harry Whittle.

The Manchester Aquatics Centre, the swimming pool used for the Manchester Commonwealth Games, stands on the campus and is used for water sports. The principal sports facilities are the Sugden Centre on Grosvenor Street, the Armitage Site near Owens Park, and the Wythenshawe Sports Ground.

The university has enjoyed success in BUCS (British Universities & Colleges Sport) competitions. The men's water polo first team won three consecutive national championships in 2009, 2010 and 2011 under the tutelage of their coach, Andy Howard. The university was placed eighth in the overall BUCS rankings for the 2009–10 season.

Each year, the university contests the Christie Cup in 28 different sports against Leeds and Liverpool, a competition Manchester has won for seven consecutive years. The Christie Cup is an inter‑university tournament between Liverpool, Leeds and Manchester that has been held in numerous sports since 1886. After the Oxford–Cambridge rivalry, the Christie Championships is the oldest English inter‑university fixture on the sporting calendar. (Note: Fourth oldest in the United Kingdom and one of the oldest in the world. The Scottish Varsity match in rugby union between the University of St Andrews and the University of Edinburgh dates to the 1860s. The Scottish Boat Race between the University of Glasgow and the University of Edinburgh was first held in 1877. In the United States, the Harvard–Yale Regatta dates back to 1852. The 1869 Princeton vs. Rutgers football game was the first intercollegiate football (soccer) game in the U.S. while the first intercollegiate rugby football game took place in 1874 when Harvard University played McGill University.) The cup was endowed by Richard Copley Christie.

Annually, a select group of elite sportsmen and sportswomen are invited to join the XXI Club, a society founded in 1932 to promote sporting excellence at the university. Most members have been awarded a Full Maroon for representing the university, and many have distinguished themselves at British Universities or national level. Active membership is limited to no more than twenty‑one individuals, each elected for a term of up to three years; upon graduation they become passive members.

The university's lacrosse club, for example, was founded in the 1883–84 season. In the following years, it won the North of England Flags twice and maintained its position among the leading English clubs. In 1885, it became one of the four founding members of the athletic union. The merger of Owens College with the university in 1904 affected the club by narrowing the pool of players available for selection. When the English Universities Lacrosse Championship was established in 1925–26 with five university teams, Manchester won the title in the inaugural season, again in 1932–33, and continued to do so throughout the 1930s.

=== University Challenge quiz programme ===
Manchester has won the BBC2 quiz programme University Challenge five times, placing it level with Imperial College London for the highest number of series victories. Since the formation of the present University of Manchester, the team has consistently reached the later stages of the competition, progressing to at least the semi‑finals at every appearance between 2005 and 2014.

In 2006, Manchester defeated Trinity Hall, Cambridge, to secure the university's first victory in the competition. The following year, the team finished as runners‑up, losing to the University of Warwick in the final. In 2009, Manchester met Corpus Christi College, Oxford, in a tightly contested final. At the gong, the score stood at 275–190 in favour of Corpus Christi, following a commanding performance by Gail Trimble. The title, however, was subsequently awarded to Manchester after it emerged that Corpus Christi team member Sam Kay had graduated eight months before the final was broadcast, leading to the team's disqualification.

Manchester reached the semi‑finals of the 2010 series before being defeated by Emmanuel College, Cambridge. The university did not enter the 2011 series for reasons that were not made public. It returned the following year, however, and won University Challenge 2012. Manchester successfully defended its title by winning University Challenge 2013, beating University College London by 190 points to 140. The university also won University Challenge 2025–26.

=== Student housing ===
Ashburne Hall, a catered hall of residence offered primarily to undergraduates, though some places are reserved for postgraduates.

The two predecessor institutions had been sharing their residential facilities for some time before they merged.

==== City Campus ====
Whitworth Park Halls of Residence, located adjacent to Whitworth Park, is owned by the University of Manchester and accommodates 1,085 students. The complex is notable for its triangular accommodation blocks. Their designer drew inspiration from a mound of excavated soil that had been left on the site in 1962 following an archaeological dig led by John Gater. The triangular design had the added benefit of reducing construction costs. Under an agreement negotiated between the university and Manchester City Council, the council assumed responsibility for financing the roofs of all student residential buildings in the area. The halls were built in the mid‑1970s.

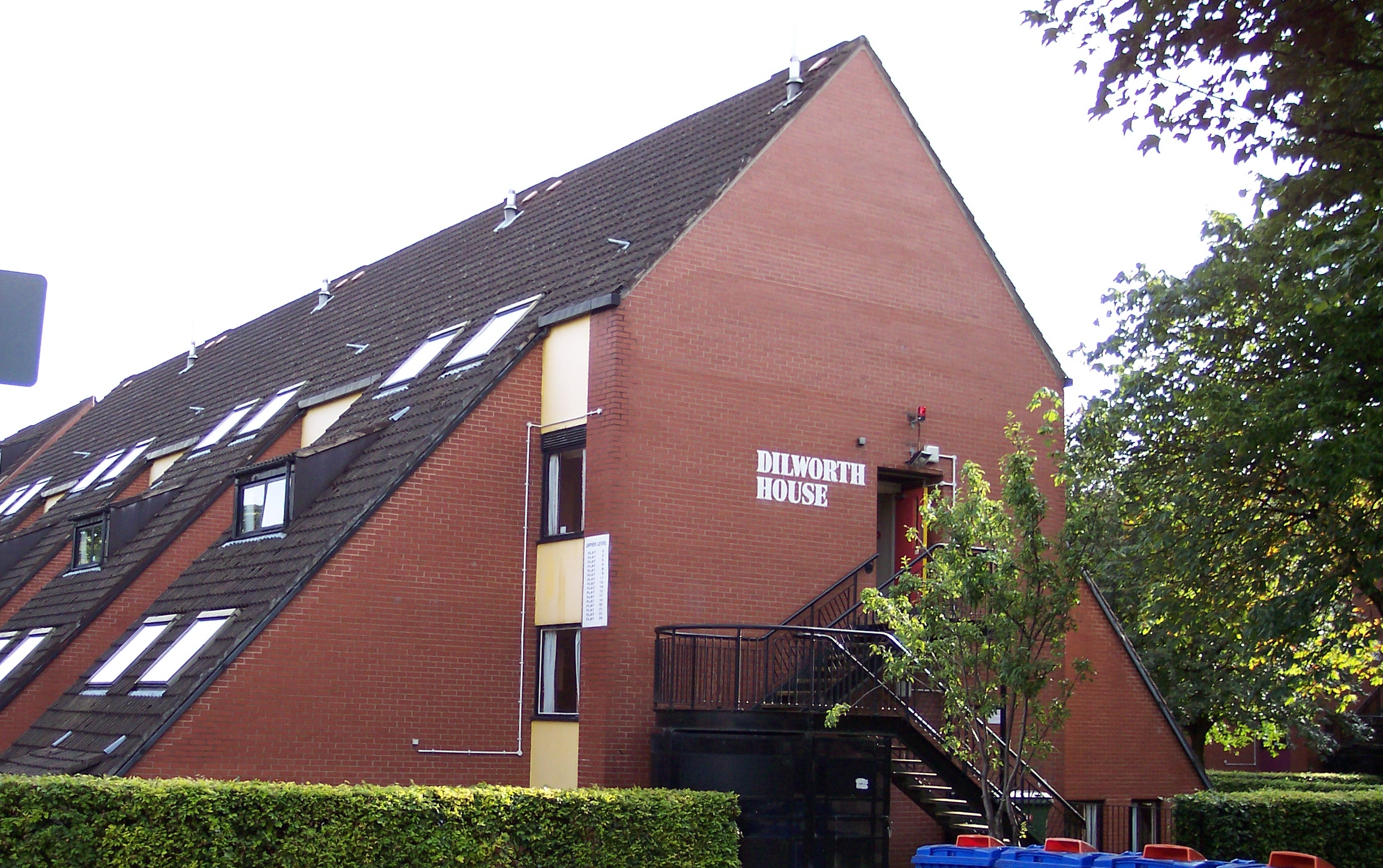
Dilworth House, one of the Whitworth Park halls of residence

The site now occupied by the halls was previously a network of small streets, the names of which are preserved in those of the individual hall buildings. Grove House, an older property, has served the university in a variety of capacities over the past sixty years. Its first occupants, in 1951, were the Appointments Board and the Manchester University Press. The shops on Thorncliffe Place, which include banks and a convenience store, formed part of the same development scheme.

Notable figures associated with the halls include Friedrich Engels, whose residence is commemorated by a blue plaque on Aberdeen House; the physicist Brian Cox; and Irene Khan, the former Secretary General of Amnesty International.

The former UMIST Campus contains four halls of residence close to the Sackville Street Building: Weston, Lambert, Fairfield and Wright Robinson. The Grosvenor Halls of Residence were demolished in 2015 to clear the site for a new engineering campus. Chandos Hall, another former residence, has also been closed and demolished.

Other residences include Vaughn House, once the home of the clergy serving the Church of the Holy Name; George Kenyon Hall at University Place; Crawford House and Devonshire House, adjacent to the Manchester Business School; and Victoria Hall on Upper Brook Street.

==== Victoria Park Campus ====
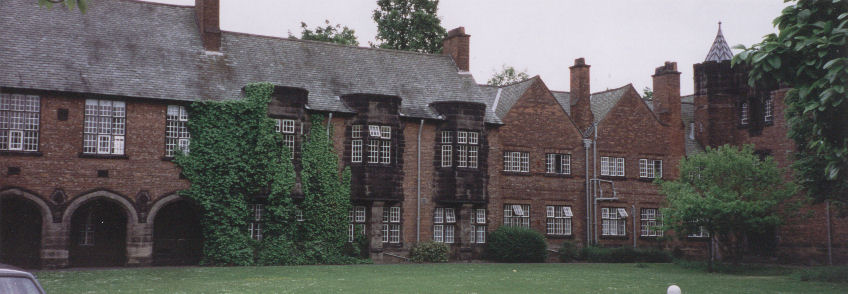
Hulme Hall, the oldest hall of residence at the university

The Victoria Park Campus contains several halls of residence, among them St. Anselm Hall with Canterbury Court, Dalton-Ellis Hall, Hulme Hall (which includes Burkhardt House), and Opal Gardens Hall. The halls in Victoria Park tend to be more traditional and are more likely to offer catered accommodation.

Hulme Hall, which opened in Plymouth Grove in 1887, is the oldest hall of residence at the university. It moved to its present site in Victoria Park in 1907.

==== Fallowfield Campus ====
The Fallowfield Campus, situated 2 miles (3.2 km) south of the Oxford Road Campus, is the largest of the university's residential campuses. It was developed largely in the 1960s as a purpose‑built student village. At its centre stood the Owens Park group of halls, formerly distinguished by a landmark tower, while Oak House provided a further hall of residence. Woolton Hall lies adjacent to Oak House. Allen Hall is a traditional hall situated near Ashburne Hall, to which Sheavyn House is annexed. Richmond Park and Unsworth Park are more recent additions to the campus; the latter opened in 2019.

== Notable people ==
Many notable people have worked or studied at the University of Manchester and its predecessor institutions, among them 26 Nobel Prize laureates.

Among the most distinguished scientists are John Dalton, the founder of modern atomic theory; Ernest Rutherford, who established the nuclear structure of the atom while at Manchester; Ludwig Wittgenstein, widely regarded as one of the foremost philosophers of the 20th century; George E. Davis, the originator of the discipline of chemical engineering; Alan Turing, a foundational figure in theoretical computer science and a significant name in the history of gay rights; Marie Stopes, a pioneer of birth control and a campaigner for women's rights; Bernard Lovell, a trailblazer in radio astronomy; Tom Kilburn and Frederic Calland Williams, the developers of the Manchester Baby, the world's first stored‑program computer; and the physicist and television presenter Brian Cox.

Notable political figures and public servants associated with the university include a current president, Samia Suluhu Hassan of Tanzania; a former president, Michael D. Higgins of the Republic of Ireland; and two serving prime ministers, Abdalla Hamdok of Sudan and Gaston Browne of Antigua and Barbuda. Several ministers in the United Kingdom, Malaysia, Canada, Hong Kong and Singapore are also among its alumni. The United Kingdom's former Secretary of State for Business and Trade, Jonathan Reynolds, is a graduate. Chaim Weizmann, a senior lecturer at the university, became the first president of Israel, and Irene Khan is a former secretary general of Amnesty International.

In the arts, alumni include the authors Anthony Burgess and Robert Bolt; Bolt won two Academy Awards and three Golden Globe Awards. Actors such as Roger Allam, Benedict Cumberbatch, Toby Jones and Parineeti Chopra studied at Manchester, as did leading figures of alternative comedy: Ben Elton, Ade Edmondson and Rik Mayall.

== See also ==
- Third-oldest university in England debate
