= Fallowfield Campus =

Residential campus of the University of Manchester

Coordinates: 53.44439°N 2.21478°W

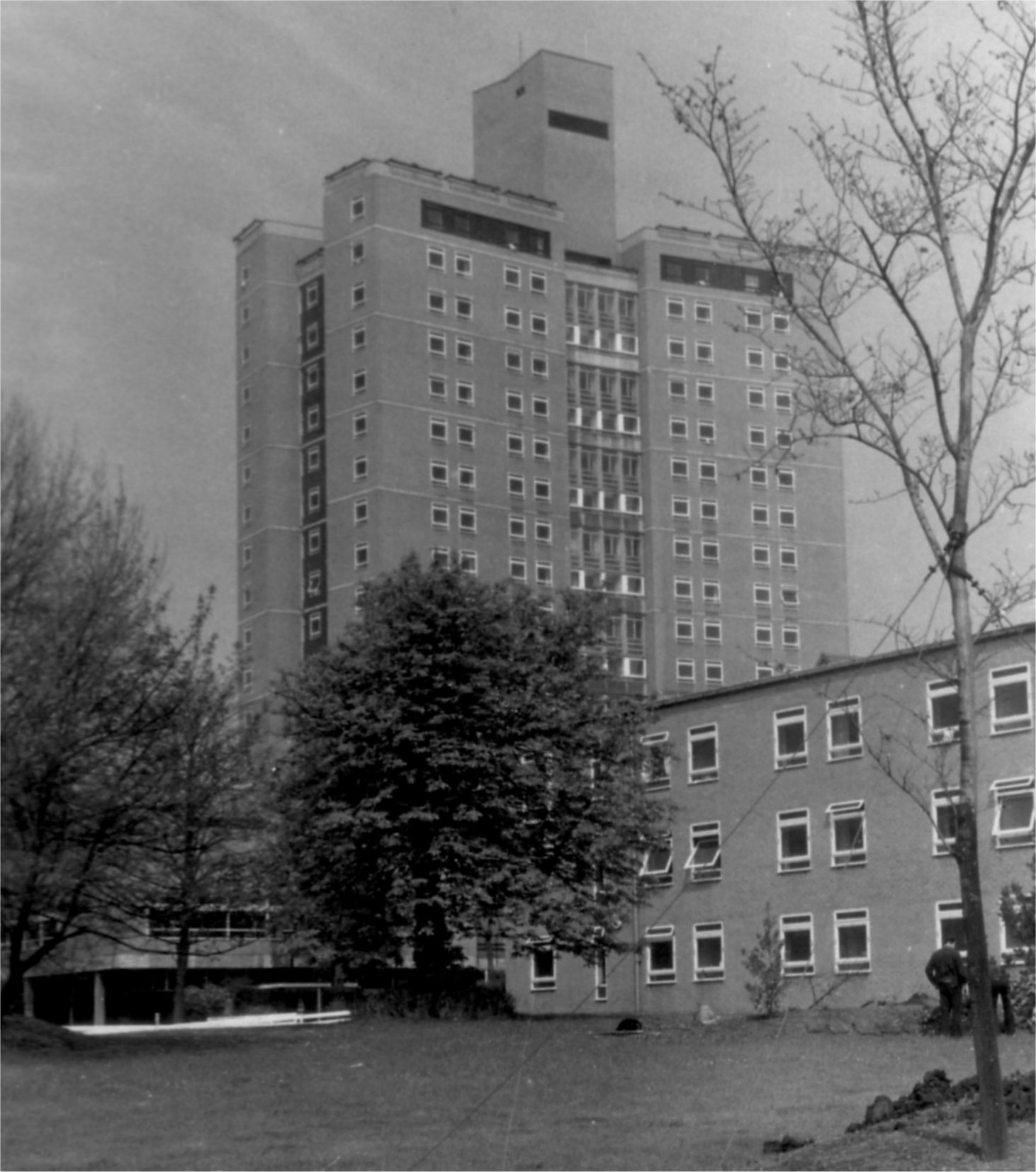
Owens Park in 1975

The Fallowfield Campus is the main residential campus of the University of Manchester. It is located in Fallowfield, Manchester, 2 miles (3 km) south of the main university site, to which it is connected by Wilmslow Road and the A34.

== History ==
The university has had an association with Fallowfield since 1910 when Ashburne Hall moved into "The Oaks" from its original home in Victoria Park, renaming it as Ashburne Hall. In 1932 the university inherited the Firs, which was used as the vice-chancellor's residence until 1991. Fallowfield was also the site of playing fields at Mab Field used by the athletics union of the university.

The campus played host to the Athletes Village for the 2002 Commonwealth Games held in the city.

The conditions and costs of the university's accommodation have been the subject of student protests in 2020 and 2023.

== Development ==
In 2004 the university unsuccessfully planned to sell and demolish a number of buildings including Owens Park, Ladybarn House and Oak House The plan was not successful owing to a residents' protest. In April 2014 the university made new plans to develop the Fallowfield campus with Mubadala Development Company offering to fund the renovations, with the new plan expected to be completed in 2027 These plans were put forward for planning permission in 2015, and have again been contested by local residents.

The 2014 redevelopment plan outlines a £200m renovation of campus including "A new student services centre, shops and a doctor's surgery are planned, as well as lawns with outdoor 'chaises longues'." There will be space for a total of 3,209 students, an increase of about 50% over the current 2,176. The number of parking spaces would more than triple from 41 to 159. The plan for the new village is to be completed in three phases, with the first phase to be completed in time for 2018/19 academic year, with construction starting after summer 2016.

== Halls of residence ==
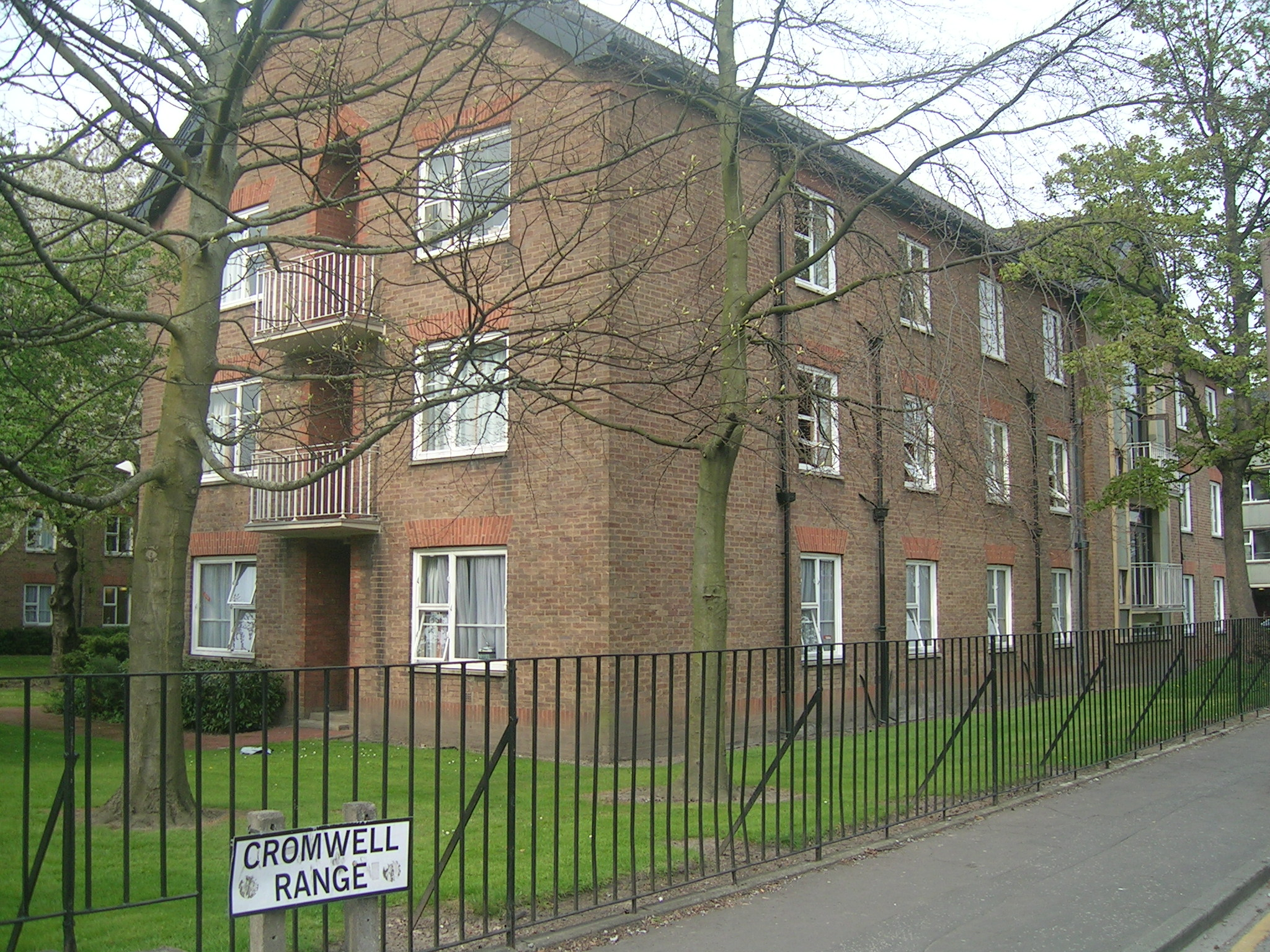
Allen Hall

Fallowfield Campus is the main area of student accommodation for University of Manchester.

=== Allen Hall ===
Allen Hall, situated on Wilmslow Road, was built as a Roman Catholic halls of residence by the bishop George Beck in 1961, and licensed to the university. As with the other halls, it encouraged diversity and allowed both Catholic and non-Catholic students. In 2012 the hall was subject to some problems including a failing boiler and the discovery of asbestos and has remained closed since then.

=== Ashburne Hall ===
Ashburne Hall

The Grade II listed Ashburne Hall was founded in 1900 by Samuel Alexander, R. D. Darbishire, C. P. Scott and Alice B. Cooke as a hall of residence for women students. (Two halls for men had already been founded in association with Owens College.) It was first located at Ashburne House in Victoria Park (donated by R. D. Darbishire for the purpose) and remained there until the removal to "The Oaks" (which was then renamed Ashburne Hall) in 1910. The new site was on Wilmslow Road at the corner of Old Hall Lane, Fallowfield.

By 1930 the hall had been extended by new buildings and enriched by the bequest from Lord Morley of his personal library. At a later date Sheavyn House was built in the grounds and commemorates Dr Sheavyn who had been warden of the hall.

=== Ladybarn House by Almero Student ===
Ladybarn House is on the corner of Moseley Road and Wilmslow Road. It was bought from the University of Manchester, by Development Securities plc. and Accrue in 2011. It was purchased for around £7 million on a long lease from the university. It consists of 117 bedrooms situated on the floors above six retail units.

Ladybarn House is a purpose-built student accommodation (PBSA) building in Fallowfield, Manchester, England. It is located at 2 Moseley Road, Fallowfield, Manchester, M14 6ND, close to the University of Manchester and Manchester Metropolitan University campuses.

The building is operated by Almero Student, a UK-based student accommodation operator. A 2020s-era refurbishment of the building's communal areas and bedrooms, converting former retail space into student amenities, was carried out with interior design input from A Designer at Heart, working alongside Bal Architects and in coordination with Steyn Group and Almero Studen

=== Oak House ===
Oak House, on Moseley Road, has a total of 1085 rooms. This is largely made up of mixed sex flats which are each divided into 8 bedrooms and include shared facilities. The hall was built in 1973 on the site of the old Oak House Hotel, which has purchased by the university in 1955 for £9,000 (worth approximately £210,900 in 2016) (Note: Comparing the retail price index between 1955 and 2016, £9,000 is valued at approximately £210,900.00 by MeasuringWorth.com) In the 1960s, the halls could cater for approximately 480 students. Flats were arranged around central staircases, unlike the other halls on at the university which were generally arranged along long corridors. The halls also had a central amenities block, with rooms like a games room and laundry. In 1988, the halls were added an extension called Holly Court bringing the total to 1085 rooms.

In 2025, Oak House was closed and demolition began.

=== Owens Park ===
Owens Park accommodation at 293 Wilmslow Road housed a total of 1,056 students. Plans for student accommodation started on the site in the 1950s, and was revolutionary in its approach of mixed gender accommodation. The first building to be constructed was the Owens Park Tower, which was designed by Building Design Partnership and opened in 1964. The tower is 19 storeys high and has a fibreglass relief, Cosmos I, by Mitzi Cunliffe, at the base.

The next phase of Owens Park opened in 1965, and won an award from the Civic trust the following year. The accommodation is split into units called "Houses", each housing about 40-50 students, with basic facilities shared by about 10-12 students. The site was used as part of the Commonwealth Games Athletes' village and included investment in a £750,000 security system

In 2021 Owens Park was closed, and as of 2025 it has been demolished as part of the Fallowfield Campus redevelopment plan.

=== Richmond Park ===
The Richmond Park halls of residence, constructed in 1994, are built on the site of the former Fallowfield Stadium where the 1893 FA Cup Final was played. Situated on Whitworth Lane, it consists of eight blocks of eight flats each with eight bedrooms.

=== Unsworth Park ===
Named in memory of Ron Unsworth, Unsworth Park opened in 2019 and provides accommodation for a total of 1122 students across 8 accommodation blocks named after bees (Bilberry, Bumble, Carder, Heath, Honey, Marsham, Mason and Tawny) and there is also The Meadow amenities and learning block.

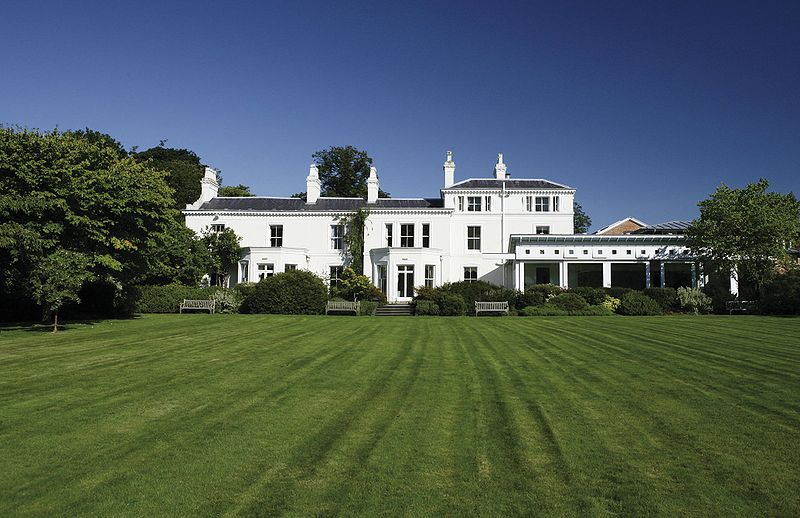
Uttley House

=== Uttley House ===
Named after writer Alison Uttley, Uttley House opened in 2021 in the former Chancellors Hotel & Conference Centre. Featuring a bar, computer cluster and amenities room, half the rooms are allocated to postgraduates and is billed by the university as a quieter halls of residence.

=== Woolton Hall ===
Woolton Hall is a mixed sex hall on Whitworth Lane It was founded in 1959 as male-only and was subject to much criticism due to the male cliques. At one point, it was described as a 'secretive little bastion of misogyny' with many of the residents displaying sexist attitudes. The halls were changed to mixed-sex accommodation in 1991. The hall was closed in 2026

=== Other halls ===
- Linton House on Wellington Road has rooms for eleven single occupancy, nineteen double and five family room.
- The Firs Villa, on Whitworth Lane next to Richmond Park, accommodates four students.

== Facilities ==
Fallowfield Campus is home to the university's botany grounds, the Firs Environmental Research Station. It consists of 18 buildings which include greenhouses, along with planting and ancillary buildings. There are also teaching and research gardens. In 2020, as a result of a £2 million endowment, the greenhouses were substantially upgraded.

The campus also includes the Limes, the catering and maintenance facility for the university. Plans have been proposed to demolish the site and replace it with four storey, town house style, residential accommodation for students. The Armitage Sports Centre is a sports centre and ground available to both students and other members of the public. It includes a number of grass and all-weather pitches for outdoor sports along with fitness classes indoors.
