= 2020 University of Manchester protests =

Student protests at the University of Manchester

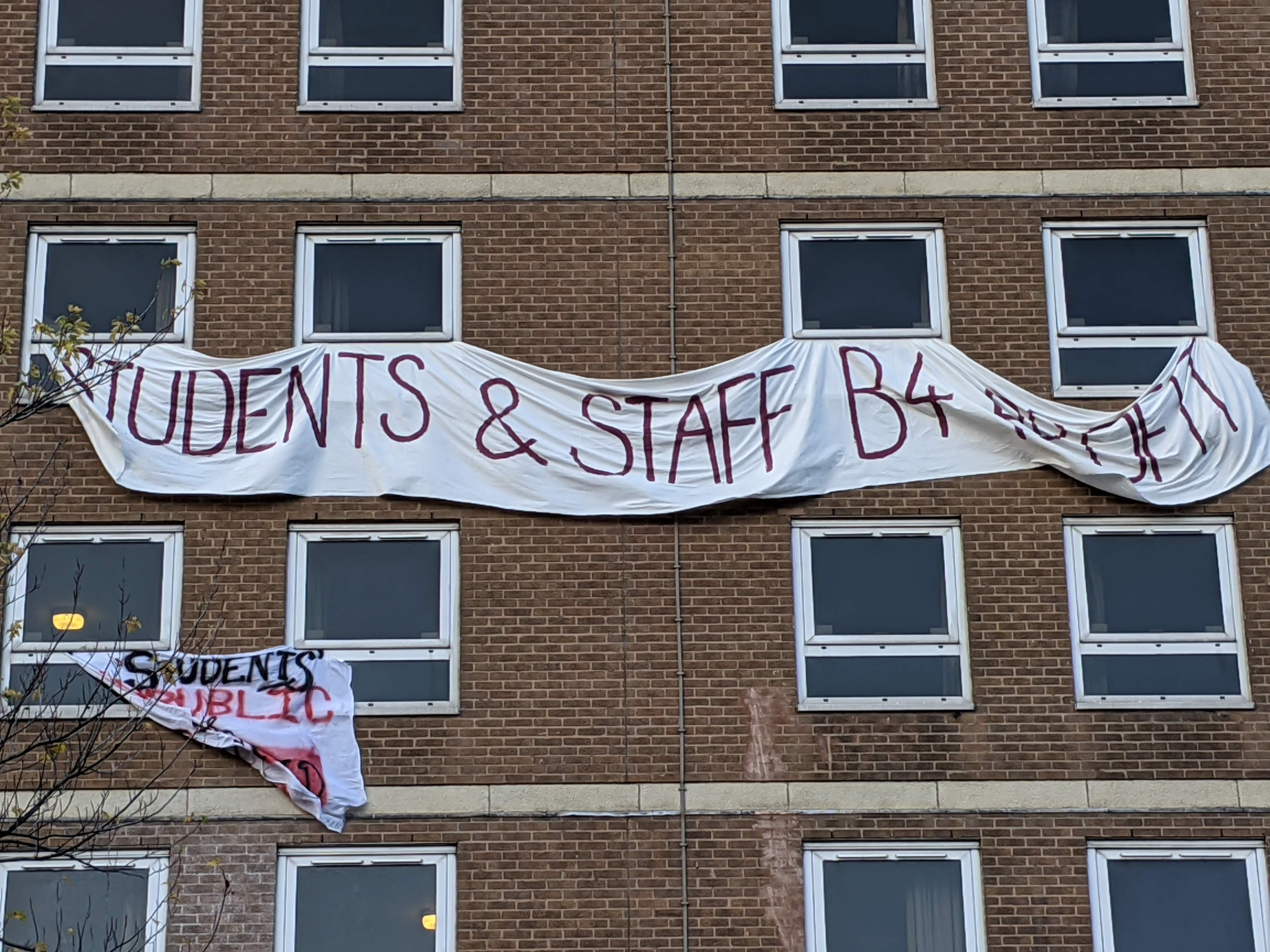
- The occupied Owens Park tower
- Date: 5 November 2020 – 25 November 2020 (2 weeks and 6 days)
- Location: University of Manchester, Manchester, England
- Goals: Removal of fencing in and around Fallowfield Campus; Reduction in rent for halls of residence
- Methods: Demonstrations; Occupation; Rent strike; Online activism
- Result: 30% reduction in rent in halls of residence for 2020-21

Parties
Students living at the Fallowfield Campus	University of Manchester

The 2020 University of Manchester protests were a series of student protests and rent strikes at the University of Manchester in England. The protests began on 5 November 2020, and occupations ended on 25 November 2020. The protest was in reaction to perceived mishandling of the response to the COVID-19 pandemic by university management. The goals of the protests were a removal of fencing erected during the COVID-19 lockdown and a reduction in rents in halls of residence. This later expanded to goals including improvement of living conditions, increased access to support services and the removal of senior university leadership figures, such as vice-chancellor Nancy Rothwell.

As a consequence of the COVID-19 pandemic, the university closed its teaching campus on 7 October 2020. At the time, cases of the virus were the highest nationally in the Fallowfield ward containing the residential campus amid illegal student parties. On 23 October, Greater Manchester was placed into a Tier 3 lockdown. On 5 November, the university erected temporary fencing to prevent mixing of households, notifying students later in the day. By the evening, a large demonstration had formed and the fencing was dismantled by protestors, with the fencing cleared by the university the next day. Following this incident, a group of students promoting a rent strike occupied the tower of the Owens Park halls. Concurrent to this, an incident occurred in which a student who was detained and questioned outside a halls of residence accused campus security of racial profiling practises. The protests ended on the 25 November when the tower was vacated following a Students' Union negotiated rent reduction.

Following the protests, an inquiry into the erection of the fences was set up to investigate the events of the 5 November, making a number of recommendations relating to communication with students and COVID-19 management. Additionally, following charges of common assault, on 18 November 2021 two security officers were acquitted of wrongdoing in the case of the racial profiling allegation. Later in March 2021, a referendum was held by the Students' Union on a motion of no confidence in the vice chancellor and other senior management staff. Despite a vote in favour of 89%, the union motion was not binding on the university and the turnout was only 13%. On 12 March 2021, the university board of governors reaffirmed their support for the senior management team.

== Protests ==
=== Demonstration ===
On 5 November 2020, over 1,000 students gathered in the centre of the campus to protest against the temporary fencing with the organisers claiming additional motivating issues. Students then began to tear down the fencing across the campus. Intended originally to address "increasing concerns over security" the university later apologized for the decision and an inquiry by the university identified "a number of failings in process and decision making".

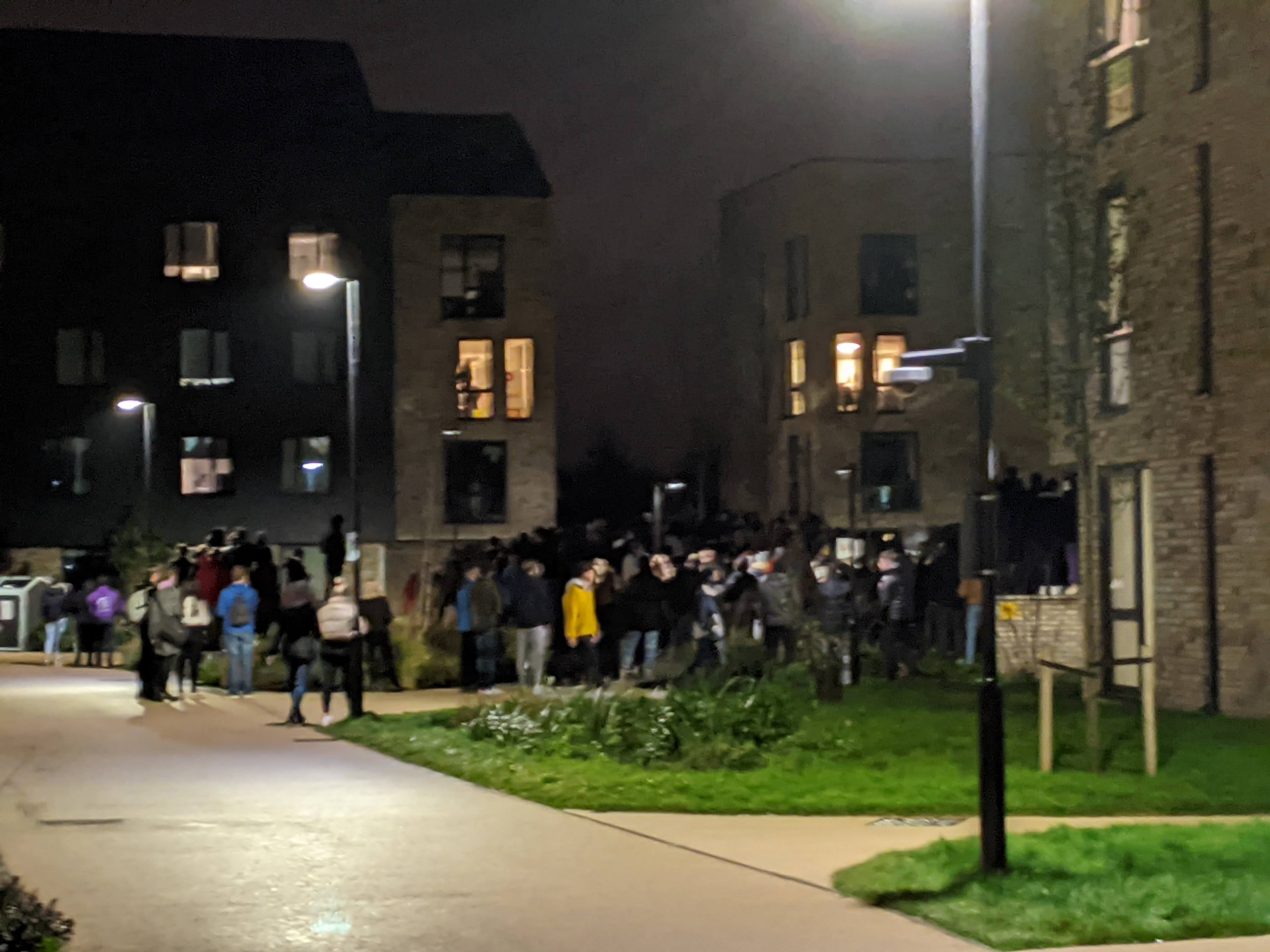
Students protesting at the Fallowfield Campus

On 12 November 2020, around 10 students involved with the rent strike occupied the 19-storey Owens Park Tower within the Fallowfield campus. They pledged to continue the occupation until the demands of the rent strike were met. The university attempted to stop food deliveries reaching the occupiers and turned off the Wi-Fi in the building but later relented after an intervention by local Manchester Gorton MP, Afzal Khan. Banners and projections with slogans were displayed on the tower and other buildings, targeted at the university and its vice chancellor, Nancy Rothwell.

The event and the actions of the university were reported by national media and condemned by singer Liam Gallagher. On the 25 November 2020, the tower was vacated after the university announced the 30% rent cut.

=== Rent strike ===
From October a group was formed of around 200 students to withhold their rent until a series of demands were met. Issues cited included; flooding, rat infestations, high rent, lack of access to facilities and support for students during lockdown and a belief that the university had misled students that face-to-face teaching would be taking place despite all teaching being moved online.

Following media coverage of the protests and negotiations with the University of Manchester Students' Union, the university conceded a 30% rent cut for all students in halls from September to January.

== Alleged racial profiling ==
On 14 November 2020, a student named Zac Adan was filmed being held and questioned by university security. The incident led to renewed media scrutiny and allegations of racial profiling and the university was forced to suspend 2 members of its security force as a result. They were later acquitted of all charges in court.

Following the incident, Nancy Rothwell appeared on the BBC Newsnight program to address it and wider issues at the university. During the interview she claimed she had written to Adan to apologise. It was later revealed that she had not in fact written to him and issued a public apology and correction.

== Aftermath ==
=== No-confidence vote ===
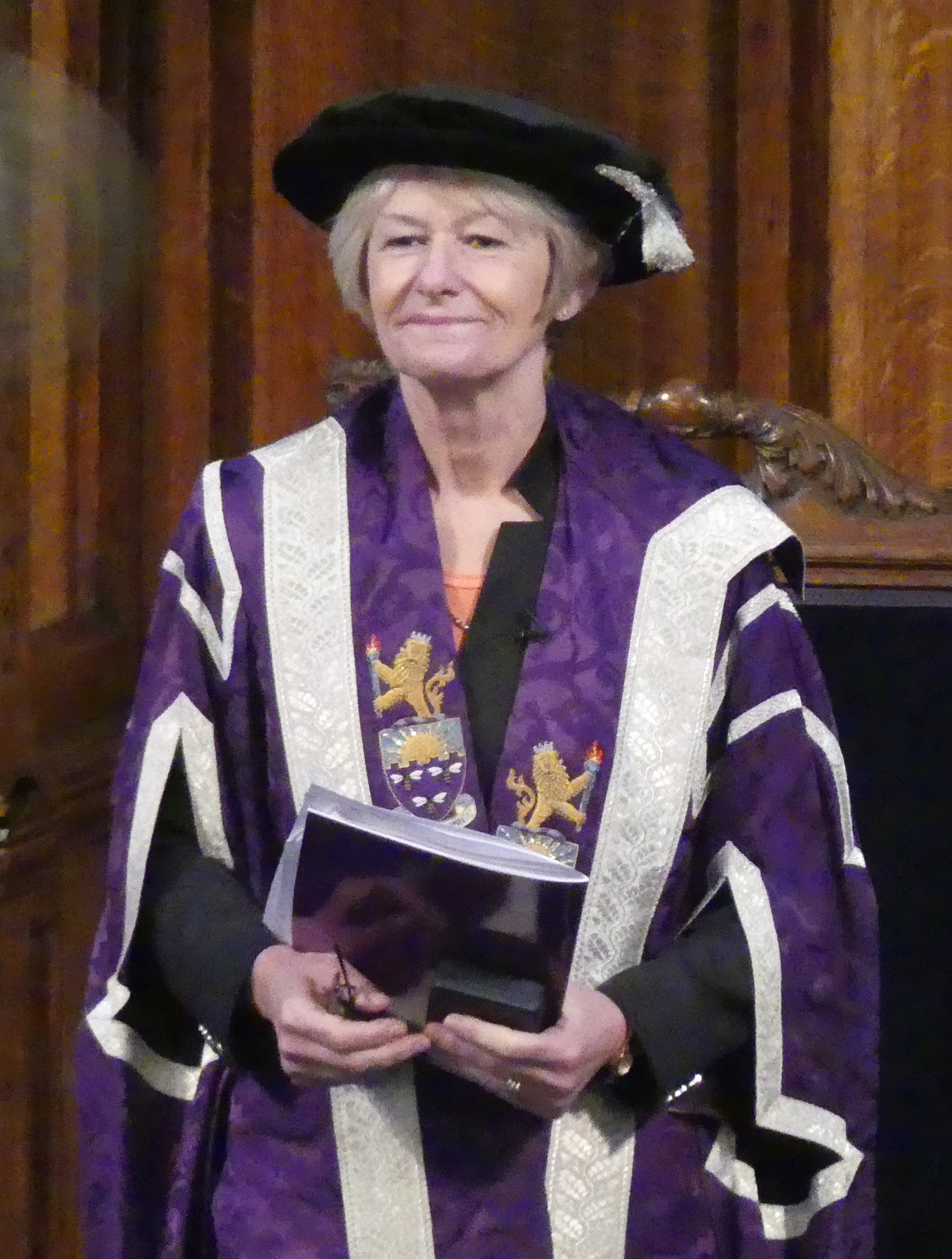
President and Vice Chancellor of the University of Manchester Nancy Rothwell

Following the series of incidents a non-binding motion of no confidence in Nancy Rothwell and senior management was put forward at the University of Manchester Students' Union. A referendum was held by the Student Union, where on a 13% turnout, 89% voted in favour of no-confidence. As the result was also non-binding, the university Board of Governors declared Rothwell had their "full confidence". No further action was taken.

== See also ==
- COVID-19 pandemic in England
- Impact of the COVID-19 pandemic on education
- COVID-19 protests in the United Kingdom
- 2023 University of Manchester protests, in reaction to the cost-of-living crisis and living conditions.
