= Squirrell (surname) =

Squirrell is a surname. Notable people with the surname include:

- Leonard Squirrell (1893–1979), English artist
- Trevor Squirrell, American politician from Vermont
