= Orisha Land =

Autonomous zone declared in Austin, Texas by Black activist group

Orisha Land was an occupation protest and self-declared autonomous zone in Austin, Texas, established on February 14, 2021, by the 400+1 collective, in response to the killing of Jordan Walton by an Austin Police officer on February 10 of the same year. As of March 5 the zone consisted of a section of Rosewood Park (which the group renamed "Jordan's Place").

== Jordan Walton's death ==
On February 10, 2021, an Austin Police officer shot and killed Jordan Walton. 400+1's account of Walton's death varies significantly from local news reports thus far. They claim Walton was experiencing a mental health crisis after running his car into an East Austin home and seeking refuge in another. "On the day he was murdered, Jordan’s parents utilized the mental health crisis resources provided by the state to no avail." 400+1 notes that the police responding to the scene did not deescalate the crisis nor deliver care to Walton. Walton's death occurred one month after the killing of Alex Gonzales Jr. and two days after the four year anniversary of David Joseph's death, both at the hands of the police.

Police were called after a report of black jeep crashing into a house. Soon after, another call was received of someone forcing them into a home. When police arrived they heard a disturbance and forced themselves inside. Jordan Walton then allegedly shot at officers and held a child hostage. He was shot by a SWAT officer.

== Orisha Land's creation ==
Four days after Walton's death, on February 14, 400+1 staked ground on a portion of Rosewood Park to protest the incident. At nine in the morning that day, they initiated a car caravan in Jordan's memory with the intent to establish a no-cop-zone within the perimeter. Orisha Land is a part of 400+1's campaign to #MartialtheBlock, which is a call to action for Black communities to reclaim their power.

The group claims autonomy and rejects the authority of the state within Rosewood Park and an eleven miles perimeter around the park in East Austin, including the location in which Walton was killed.

== End ==
On March 11, 2021, the occupation was evicted, apparently without resistance. In the course of the eviction, the erected tents and other objects were taken away with garbage trucks.
