= Thomas William Wilkinson =

Thomas William Wilkinson may refer to:

- Thomas Wilkinson (bishop of Hexham and Newcastle) (1825–1909), English prelate of the Roman Catholic Church
- Thomas Wilkinson (sculptor) (1875–1950), British sculptor
