= Quebec joint trade union front, 2015 =

Alliance of Quebec trade unions

- Date: October 26, 2015 –
- Location: Quebec, Canada
- Methods: Street protesters; Occupations; Picketing; Advertising campaign

The Quebec joint trade union front of 2015 (French: Front commun syndical de 2015) is the name given to the alliance of Quebec trade unions in order to achieve a new collective agreements in 2015 with the Quebec government.
