= Ipswich School of Art =

Former art school in Ipswich, England

Coordinates: 52°03′40″N 1°09′03″E

Ipswich School of Art (ISA) was an art school in Ipswich, Suffolk, England. It was founded as the Ipswich School of Science and Art which opened on 10 January 1859 (167 years ago). It continued to have an independent existence until 1997 (29 years ago), when it was absorbed by the University of Suffolk.

The ISA was founded on the initiative of the Science and Art Department, a subdivision of the Board of Trade

== Notable alumni ==
- Margaret Tempest, illustrator and author
- Thomas Wilkinson, sculptor
- Brian Eno, musician
- Leonard Squirrell, artist
