= Little Grey Rabbit =

English children's book series

Little Grey Rabbit is the lead character in a classic, eponymous series of English children's books, written by Alison Uttley and illustrated by Margaret Tempest, except for the last five, illustrated by Katherine Wigglesworth. They appeared over a forty-year period up to the mid-1970s to great acclaim, and gave rise to a TV series in 2000.

== Characters ==
- Little Grey Rabbit – a modest, gentle, motherly soul, who lives with her two friends, Hare and Squirrel
- Hare – a boastful fellow up for a little adventure, who cares about his friends
- Squirrel – a self-centred creature, who cares about her looks, but is affectionate
- Milkman Hedgehog – who milks the cows and distributes the milk to the animals
- Mrs Hedgehog – Milkman's wife
- Fuzzypeg – Milkman and Mrs Hedgehog's excitable son
- Bill and Tim Hedgehog – Fuzzypeg's cousins who attend school with him
- Brush – a wandering hedgehog
- Robin – the postman
- Water Rat
- Mrs Webster, a water vole
- Rat – a friend of the hens at the hen house
- Brock the Badger
- Fox – a troublesome sort, who plots to make a meal out one of the animals
- Speckledy Hen – who gives out eggs that she lays to her friends
- Moldy Warp – a mole who loves treasure hunting
- Wise Owl – a source of information, but often grumpy if disturbed in the daytime

== Books ==
The Squirrel, The Hare and the Little Grey Rabbit.

The books marked with* were featured in the TV series of the year 2000.

=== Heinemann ===
- The Squirrel, The Hare and the Little Grey Rabbit – 1929*
- How Little Grey Rabbit Got Back Her Tail – 1930*
- The Great Adventure of Hare – 1931*
- The Story of Fuzzypeg the Hedgehog – 1932*
- Three Little Grey Rabbit Plays – 1961
- Fuzzypeg's Brother – 1971
- Tales of Little Grey Rabbit with illustrations by Faith Jaques – 1980
- Little Grey Rabbit's House: A Model House to Make and Play with Complete with Movable Furniture and Cutouts and a Story by Alison Uttley. Devised and painted by Faith Jaques – 1982

=== Collins ===
- Squirrel Goes Skating – 1934*
- Wise Owl's Story – 1935*
- Little Grey Rabbit's Party – 1936*
- The Knot Squirrel Tied – 1937*
- Fuzzypeg Goes to School – 1938*
- Little Grey Rabbit's Christmas – 1939*
- My Little Grey Rabbit Painting Book – 1940
- Moldy Warp the Mole – 1940*
- Hare Joins the Home Guard – 1942
- Little Grey Rabbit's Washing Day – 1942*
- Water Rat's Picnic – 1943*
- Little Grey Rabbit's Birthday – 1944*
- The Speckledy Hen – 1945*
- Little Grey Rabbit to the Rescue – 1945
- Little Grey Rabbit and the Weasels – 1947*
- Grey Rabbit and the Wandering Hedgehog – 1948*
- Little Grey Rabbit Makes Lace – 1950*
- Hare and the Easter Eggs – 1952*
- Little Grey Rabbit's Valentine – 1953*
- Little Grey Rabbit Goes to the Sea – 1954*
- Hare and Guy Fawkes – 1956
- Little Grey Rabbit's Paint-Box – 1958*
- Grey Rabbit Finds a Shoe – 1960
- Grey Rabbit and the Circus – 1961*
- Grey Rabbit's May Day – 1963*
- Hare Goes Shopping – 1965
- Little Grey Rabbit's Pancake Day – 1967*
- Little Grey Rabbit Goes to the North Pole – 1970
- Little Grey Rabbit's Spring Cleaning Party – 1972
- Little Grey Rabbit and the Snow-Baby – 1973
- Hare and the Rainbow – 1975

== Television series ==
In January 2000, Cosgrove Hall Films created an animated TV series consisting of 26 episodes based closely on the books, each 10 minutes in length.

Episode list

1. The Squirrel, the Hare, and the Little Grey Rabbit
2. How Little Grey Rabbit Got Back Her Tail
3. Squirrel Goes Skating
4. The Knot Squirrel Tied
5. The Story of Fuzzypeg the Hedgehog
6. Little Grey Rabbit's Birthday
7. The Great Adventure of Hare
8. Moldy Warp the Mole
9. Little Grey Rabbit and the Circus
10. Little Grey Rabbit's Pancake Day
11. Fuzzypeg Goes to School
12. Little Grey Rabbit Goes to the Sea
13. Little Grey Rabbit's Valentine
14. Hare and the Easter Eggs
15. Grey Rabbit's May Day
16. Little Grey Rabbit and the Wandering Hedgehog
17. Wise Owl's Story
18. Little Grey Rabbit's Paint Box
19. Little Grey Rabbit and the Weasels
20. Hare Goes to Battle
21. Water-Rat's Picnic
22. Little Grey Rabbit's Party
23. Little Grey Rabbit's Christmas
24. Little Grey Rabbit's Washing Day
25. Little Grey Rabbit Makes Lace

Cast

- Pauline Collins – Little Grey Rabbit
- Hugh Laurie – Hare
- Eve Karpf – Squirrel
- Andrew Sachs – Narrator
- Rob Rackstraw – Others
- Jimmy Hibbert – Others
- Melissa Sinden – Others

Crew

- Jean Flynn – director, producer
- Dan Maddicott – executive producer
- Mark Hall – executive producer
- Alison Uttley – book author
- Helen Cresswell – screenwriter
