= Grimwood Mears =

British barrister (1869-1963)

Sir Edward Grimwood Mears KCIE

9th Chief justice of Allahabad High Court
- In office 29 October 1919 – 15 March 1932
- Appointed by: George V
- Preceded by: Henry George Richards
- Succeeded by: Shah Muhammad Sulaiman

Personal details
- Born: 21 January 1869
- Died: 20 May 1963 (aged 94)
- Spouse: Margaret Tempest
- Relations: Alex Paton (grandson)
- Education: Exeter College, University of Oxford

Sir Edward Grimwood Mears KCIE (21 January 1869 – 20 May 1963) was a British barrister, who gave up his practice at the Bar to work on the Committee on Alleged German Outrages, which looked at the 1914-15 German atrocities in Belgium. He was appointed secretary of the Dardanelles Commission in return for a knighthood, worked on the reply to The German White Book, and in 1916 was part of the Royal Commission on the Easter Rising in Ireland.

In 1919, Mears was appointed chief justice of the High Court of Judicature at Allahabad, in British India.

== Early life and family ==
Edward Grimwood Mears was born on 21 January 1869, the only son of William Mears of Winchester. He graduated from Exeter College, University of Oxford, in 1893 and two years later was called to the bar at the Inner Temple.

In 1896 Mears married Annie, daughter of G. P. Jacob of Bryngoleu, Shawford. They had a son, Brigadier-General Gerald Grimwood Mears and a daughter, Isabel, whose son was the noted gastroenterologist, Alex Paton. After the death of his wife Annie in 1943, Mears in 1951 married her cousin, Margaret Tempest, an author and illustrator of children's books.

== First World War ==
At the request of the British government, Mears gave up his practice at the bar to work on the Bryce Commission, also known as the Committee on Alleged German Outrages, which looked at the 1914-15 German atrocities in Belgium. He worked on the reply to The German White Book. In 1915 he was appointed secretary of the Dardanelles Commission, in return for a knighthood. The following year, he was appointed secretary to the Royal Commission on the Easter Rising in Ireland. In 1918, he was Lord Reading's assistant on a trip to Washington, when he represented Britain on the inter-allied cereal committee.

== High Court of Judicature at Allahabad ==
In 1919, Mears was appointed chief justice of the High Court of Judicature at Allahabad, India. He despised Indian nationalism and during his time in Allahabad, he tried to persuade Jawaharlal Nehru to become education minister for the British government in India.

In India, Mears acted as an intermediary between the then viceroy Edward Wood (later Lord Irwin) and key leaders in the Indian National Congress. On 24 March 1929, Mears met with Motilal Nehru at the residence of Tej Bahadur Sapru. There, he heard of the request for Dominion status of India. It was subsequently at Mears' suggestion to Irwin that a round table conference was convened to discuss the request.

== Publications ==
- "A reply to the German white book on the conduct of the German troops in Belgium". (1916)
- "Royal Commission on the Rebellion in Ireland".1916

== Death ==
Mears died in 1963 in Ipswich.
