= Uttley House =

Building in Manchester, England

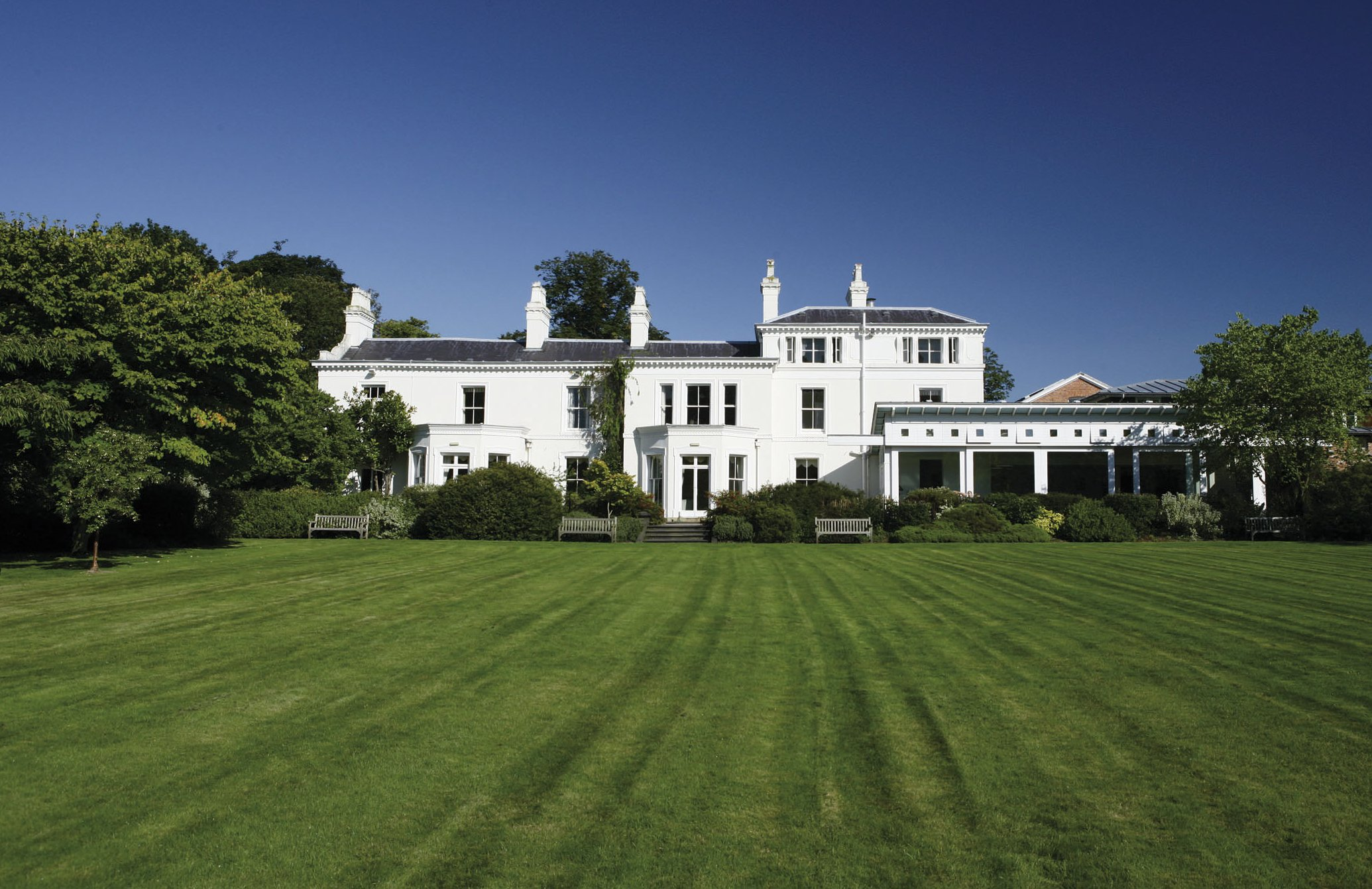
- The original Firs section
- Interactive map of the Uttley House area
- Former names: The Firs, Chancellors Hotel & Conference Centre

General information
- Location: Fallowfield Campus, Chancellors Way, Fallowfield, Manchester
- Coordinates: 53.443611°N 2.213333°W
- Completed: 1850
- Owner: University of Manchester

Design and construction
- Architect: Edward Walters
- Designations

Listed Building – Grade II
- Official name: The Firs and attached annex
- Designated: 2 October 1974
- Reference no.: 1270605

Listed Building – Grade II
- Official name: Lodge of The Firs, with attached gateway
- Designated: 2 October 1974
- Reference no.: 1254834

Uttley House (formerly named The Firs), is a Grade II listed building and halls of residence in Fallowfield, Manchester, England. It was designed and built in 1850 by Edward Walters, who was also responsible for Manchester's Free Trade Hall. The building is named after English writer Alison Uttley. It was originally built for Sir Joseph Whitworth; the house was later the home of C. P. Scott, editor of the Manchester Guardian. It is surrounded by 5.5 acres (2.2 ha) of gardens to the south and an environmental research institute to the north. The house has seen many past uses, including a private home, hotel, vaccination clinic and conference centre.

== History ==
=== The Firs ===
Whitworth used The Firs mainly as a social, political and business base, entertaining radicals of the age such as John Bright, Richard Cobden, William Forster and T. H. Huxley at the time of the Reform Bill of 1867. Whitworth, credited with raising the art of machine-tool building to a previously unknown level, supported the new Mechanics Institute in Manchester — the birthplace of UMIST — and helped to found the Manchester School of Design. To the rear, Whitworth had a shooting range — now the site of the University's horticultural glasshouses — on which he tested his famous, but commercially unsuccessful, Whitworth Rifle, which featured a revolutionary hexagonally rifled barrel. The house was surrounded by a 52 acres (21 ha) estate that now makes up the current Fallowfield Campus.

In 1882, having built a new house in Darley Dale, Whitworth leased The Firs to his friend C.P. Scott, editor of the Manchester Guardian. After Scott's death the house became the property of the University of Manchester, and was the vice-chancellor's residence until 1991. The house is a Grade II listed building.

=== Hotel ===
The house was converted into a hotel and re-opened as the Chancellors Hotel & Conference Centre in 1997. A large extension to the Grade II building was completed for the hotel, giving it a capacity of 72 rooms. The hotel was operated by the university's events venue arm as a conference centre and featured a restaurant, bar and conference facilities. Operations ceased in 2019, as the university prepared to repurpose the site as part of the university's redevelopment of the existing buildings on the campus.

During the COVID-19 pandemic, the former hotel site was used as a vaccination centre.

== Student accommodation ==
=== Halls of residence ===
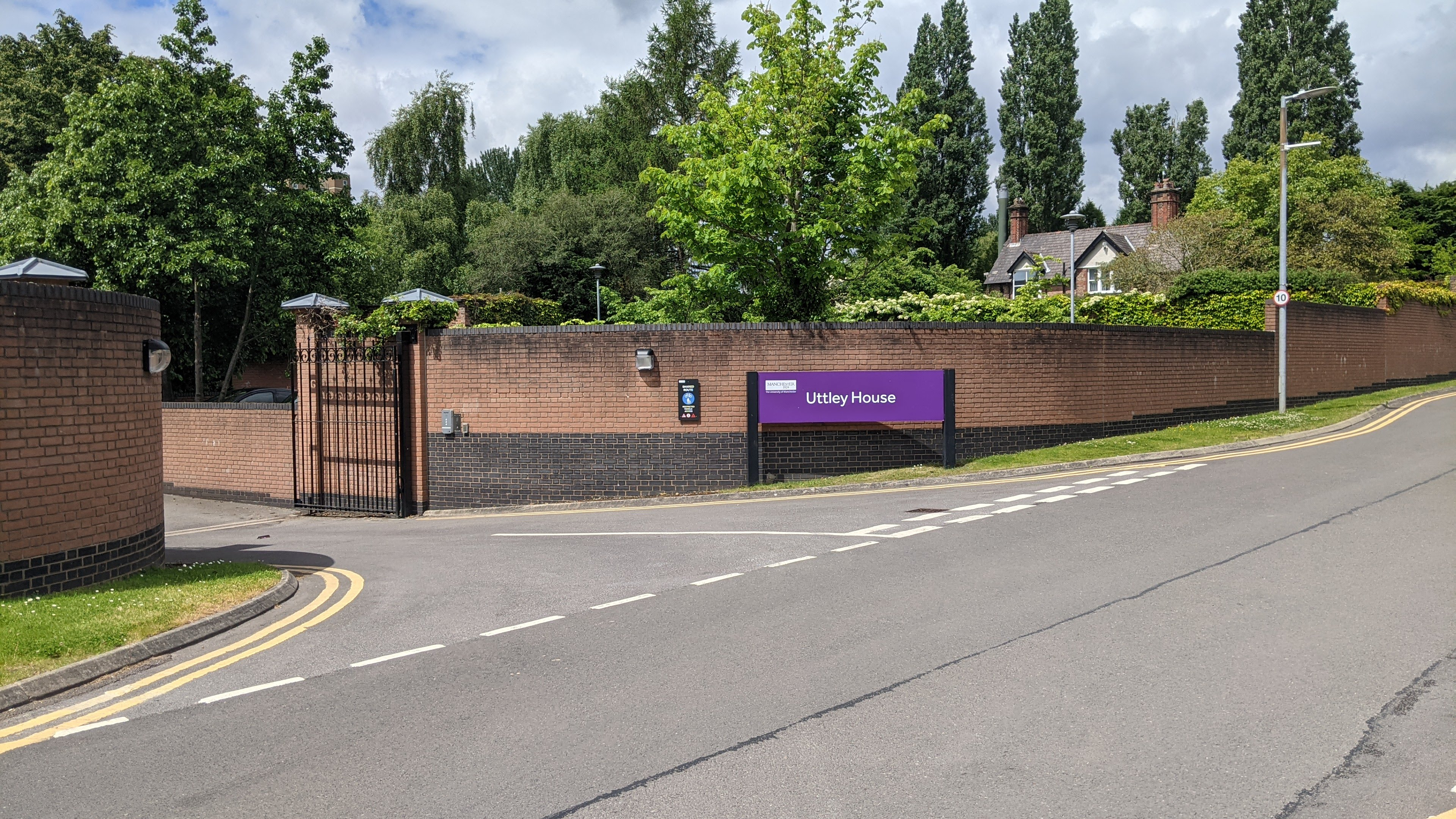
Entrance from Chancellors Way

In 2021, as part of a redevelopment of the Fallowfield Campus, the hotel was converted into a student hall of residence and renamed Uttley House, after writer Alison Uttley. The halls of residence Junior Common Room is shared with Richmond Park, another hall of residence to the north.

=== Uttley Bar ===
In 2022, the ground floor of Uttley House was refurbished into a campus bar, offering affordable food and beverages for the residents of Fallowfield Campus. Since the closure of Oak House bar 'Squirrels' in 2025, Uttley Bar has become the social centre of Fallowfield Campus with a bustling social scene. It offers a regular schedule of events including a quiz night and casino night.

== Firs Environmental Research Station ==
Included in the site formerly part of The Firs is the Firs Environmental Research Station, a research institute of the Department of Earth and Environmental Sciences. During World War I, various drugs were grown and developed at the station, including Atropa belladonna and Hyoscyamus niger. The facility houses an air quality monitoring station, greenhouses, climate controlled growing environments and remnants of the old botanical garden.

In 2020, as a result of a £2 million endowment, the greenhouses were substantially upgraded.

== See also ==
- Fallowfield Campus
- Listed buildings in Manchester-M14
