= Margaret Tempest =

British illustrator and author (1892–1982)

- Born: Margaret Mary Tempest; 1892; Ipswich, Suffolk, England
- Died: 1982 (aged 89–90)
- Education: Ipswich School of Art; Westminster School of Art
- Occupations: Children's author and illustrator
- Known for: Little Grey Rabbit illustrations
- Spouse: Sir Edward Grimwood Mears (m. 1951)

Margaret Mary Tempest (1892–1982) was a British illustrator and author, best known for her illustrations of Alison Uttley's Little Grey Rabbit books.

== Life ==
Margaret Tempest was born at 2 Fonnereau Road, Ipswich, Suffolk, in 1892. She lived most of her life in the town, attending Ipswich High School, Ipswich School of Art and then the Westminster School of Art, graduating in 1914. She was co-founder of the Chelsea Illustrators Club, through which former students exhibited and sold their art.

From 1929 until the 1960s, she illustrated the Little Grey Rabbit books, as well as other children's books. She also wrote and illustrated her own books of the "dressed animal" type, notably the Curly Cobbler series. She illustrated a number of religious-themed books, such as A Sunday Book for Children (1954) and Little Lamb of Bethlehem (1957).

She married Sir Edward Grimwood Mears, in 1951. Her step-grandson was the physician Alex Paton.
