= Alex Paton (physician) =

British gastroenterologist, writer, and dean

Alexander Paton
- Born: 2 March 1924; Allahabad, India
- Died: 12 September 2015 (aged 91)
- Education: Alleyn Court Prep School; Canford School, Dorset; St Thomas's Hospital Medical School
- Occupation: Physician
- Known for: London medical students at Belsen; Study of the effects of alcoholic liver cirrhosis; Postgraduate Dean; First chairman of the medical committee of Alcohol Concern
- Medical career
- Institutions: Dudley Road Hospital; North-West London hospitals; St Ann's Hospital
- Sub-specialties: Gastroenterology
- Research: Alcohol misuse
- Notable works: ABC of Alcohol (1982)

Alexander Paton (2 March 1924 – 12 September 2015) was a British gastroenterologist, writer and postgraduate dean for North-West London hospitals, who was a specialist in alcohol misuse.

In 1945, while studying medicine at St Thomas's Hospital Medical School, Paton was one of the London medical students who volunteered to go to Bergen-Belsen concentration camp shortly after its liberation by British troops, to assist in administering the "starvation diet" to the severely malnourished and dying inmates.

Paton was one of the first intake of doctors into the British National Health Service and later became a registrar to Sheila Sherlock, a recognised authority on liver disease. In 1959, he was appointed consultant physician to Dudley Road Hospital, Birmingham, where he taught medical students for the MRCP, established an endoscopy service and began a 20-year study of the effects of alcoholic liver cirrhosis.

Paton later held consultant positions at the St Ann's Hospital and the Prince of Wales Hospital in North London, and became the first chairman of the medical committee of Alcohol Concern. His book, ABC of Alcohol, went through four editions.

== Early life ==
Alexander Paton was born on 2 March 1924 in Allahabad, India. His father, also called Alex, was an army colonel who had been awarded the Military Cross. His mother, Isabel Sybil Emma Grimwood Mears was the daughter of Sir Edward Grimwood Mears, chief justice of the High Court of Allahabad.

After completing his early education at Alleyn Court Prep School, Essex, he gained a scholarship to Canford School in Dorset and subsequently gained admission to study medicine at St Thomas's Hospital Medical School, London during The Blitz.

== Belsen ==
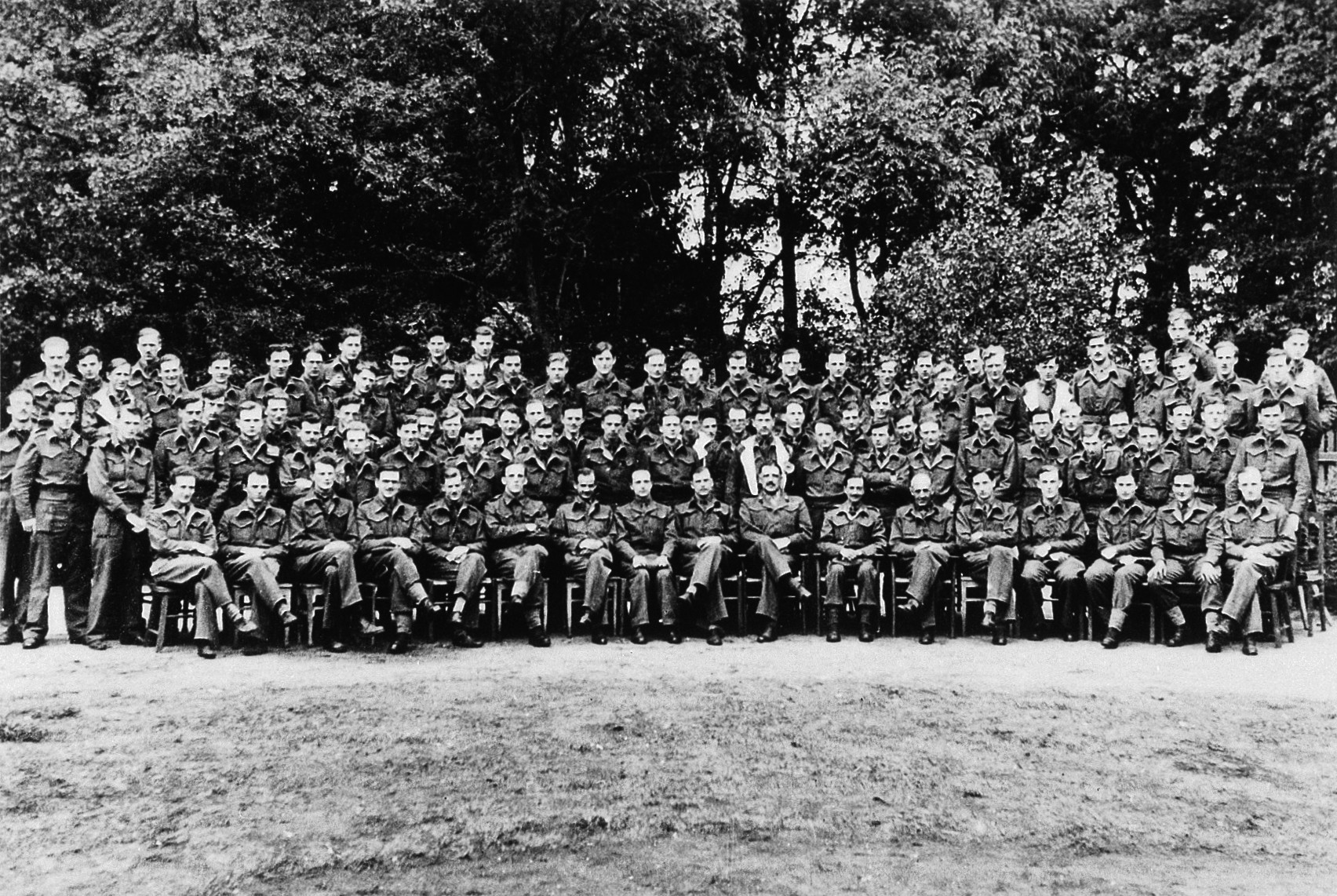
Group photo of London Medical students who went to Belsen

Paton was one of the London medical students who were sent to Bergen-Belsen concentration camp in 1945, shortly after its liberation by the British troops, to assist Arnold Peter Meiklejohn in administering what was known as the "starvation diet" to the severely malnourished and dying inmates. Many of these inmates had such advanced malnutrition that they were intolerant of large, highly nutritious meals and the diet comprised small, frequent, bland meals which were much better tolerated.

In his memoirs, published in the British Medical Journal in 1981, he described how on 4 April 1945 there was a proposed trip to Holland for 12 St Thomas's students. He put his name down and on 12 April was at the Hotel Grand Central at Marylebone collecting his kit. After a briefing by Richard Doll, explaining how they were to feed the starving Dutch with an experimental mixture, they were asked to "keep detailed records".

On 28 April, they were informed that the destination had changed to Belsen and they were rushed to Cirencester, where they spent three "frustrating" days. He recalled how the newspapers had already announced that "100 students from nine London medical schools are being rushed to Germany". They arrived in Belsen on 2 May 1945 and on the following day began to clean up the huts in the camp and supervise feeding of inmates. With another student A. T. Cook, they were one of the first to create a hospital from a hut. Upon return, he landed at Croydon on 29 May 1945 "with feelings that are too complicated to analyse at the moment".

== Career ==
Paton qualified in 1947 and was one of the first intake of doctors into the new NHS. After house officer posts he spent two years' doing national service in the Royal Army Medical Corps in Trieste. Following a post in Salisbury in 1950, and another at St Helier Hospital in 1951, he became registrar to Sheila Sherlock, an expert in liver disease, at the Royal Postgraduate Medical School, part of the Hammersmith Hospital. At his interview with Sherlock, she asked Paton "are you prepared to push patients in a bed to the laboratory? You are? The job is yours". During this post, he kept a private diary in which he wrote about the research into liver disease, saying... "we and anyone else at Hammersmith use subjects for experiments who will not necessarily benefit by them". He quoted his South African houseman as saying "the beds are nothing more than an annexe to the medical laboratories".

He completed his MD at Yale University on the topic of neurology in diabetes mellitus. In 1959, he was appointed consultant physician to Dudley Road Hospital, Birmingham, where his main focus was on emergency medicine, internal medicine and the liver. Here he taught postgraduate medical students who were preparing for the MRCP examination, established an endoscopy service and began a 20-year study of the effects of alcoholic liver cirrhosis.

In 1973, Paton took a one-year sabbatical as a visiting professor of medicine in Baghdad. In 1981 he returned to London and became postgraduate Dean for North-West London hospitals. He took up consultant positions at the St Ann's Hospital and the Prince of Wales Hospital in North London, and became the first chairman of the medical committee of Alcohol Concern.

In the British Medical Journal's ABC of Alcohol, which he edited, Paton described people's patterns of drinking and its association with genetic, constitutional and environmental factors, and explained why women were more susceptible to the effects of alcohol than men. In addition he highlighted how alcohol misuse was easily missed in the elderly.

On reviewing the book Medical Nemesis by Ivan Illich, he was one of the few reviewers supporting Illich, saying that "his argument is closely reasoned, sometimes obscure, often exasperating, but never dull, and fully documented".

In 1987, he retired and for the next three years worked at the addictions unit at the Warneford Hospital, Oxford.

== Other roles ==
Paton was a member of the Association of Physicians, the Medical Research Society, Haringey Health Authority, the scholarship committee of the Wingate Foundation, the Pensions Appeal Tribunal of which he later became chairman, and the Royal College of Physicians of which he was examiner and regional adviser. For seven years he was secretary of the West Midlands Physicians Association. He also chaired the travelling fellowships committee of the King's Fund.

== Personal and family ==
In 1947 he married Phyllis Ann Jennifer Pepys, better known as Ann, a nurse and descendant of Samuel Pepys' cousin and Sir Lucas Pepys. They later retired to rural Oxfordshire together. Margaret Tempest became his step-grand mother in 1951, when she married his grandfather.

He played tennis, enjoyed climbing, skiing, walking, classical music, the arts, photography, natural history, church architecture and travelling. He visited Antarctica twice.

One son, Charles, died in 1973 and his wife Ann died in 2008. They had two other sons, Alex and Anthony, and two daughters, Clare and Rachel.

== Death and legacy ==
Paton died on 12 September 2015.

His memoirs are included in the 2005 book After Daybreak: The Liberation of Belsen, 1945 by Ben Shephard. He was portrayed in the 2007 feature-length drama titled The Relief of Belsen in which he quotes "in my hut there were no deaths today, sir".

== Selected publications ==
Paton wrote a number of articles for newspapers, edited work in the British Medical Journal for 50 years and was a member of Stephen Lock's BMJ writing workshops. He also wrote and edited the BMJ's publication ABC of Alcohol, which went through four editions. On the confusion between 'effect' and 'affect', he wrote "these words are commonly used, and misuse may seriously affect (alter) meaning".

His time in Baghdad led him to write about the Marsh Arabs.

=== Articles ===
- Freemantle, N; House, A; Song, F; Mason, JM; Sheldon, TA (1994). "Prescribing selective serotonin reuptake inhibitors as strategy for prevention of suicide". BMJ. 309 (6949): 249–53. doi:10.1136/bmj.309.6949.249. PMC 2540780. PMID 7832842.
- Paton, A. (1999). "Reflections on Alcohol and the Young". Alcohol and Alcoholism. 34 (4): 502–505. doi:10.1093/alcalc/34.4.502. PMID 10456577.
- Paton, A (2005). "Alcohol in the body". BMJ. 330 (7482): 85–7. doi:10.1136/bmj.330.7482.85. PMC 543875. PMID 15637372.
- Paton, Alex (2000). "Alcohol: matters of life and death". Hospital Medicine. 61 (3): 156–157. doi:10.12968/hosp.2000.61.3.1290. PMID 10789381.

=== Books ===
- Liver Disease. William Heinemann, London, 1969. ISBN 0433247207
- ABC of Alcohol. Blackwell Publishing, Oxford, 1982. (Four editions, co-edited with Robin Touquet)
