= 2023 University of Manchester protests =

Student protests at the University of Manchester

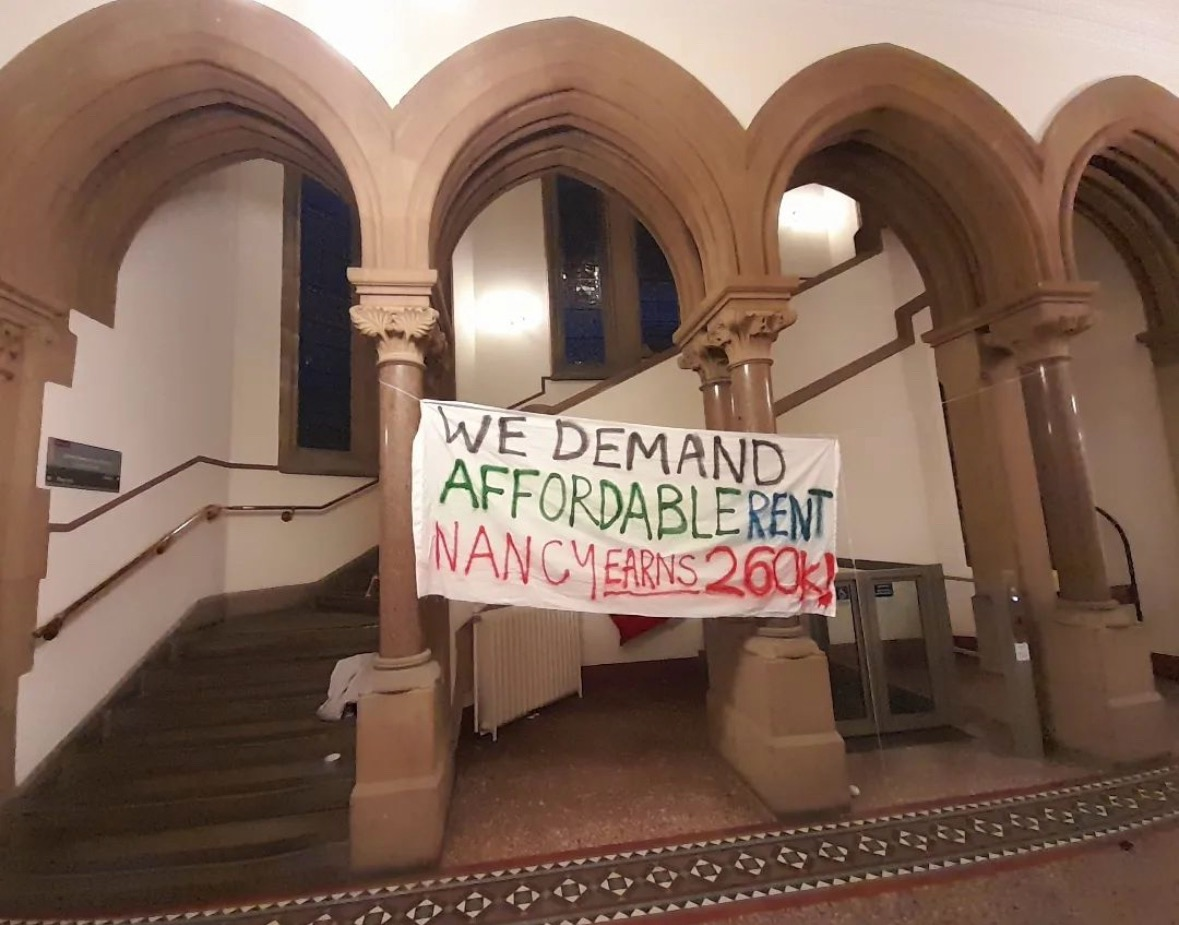
- Hanging protest banner at the University of Manchester
- Date: 19 January 2023–17 December 2023
- Location: University of Manchester, Manchester, England
- Goals: 30% reduction in rent for halls of residence and 30% of the October payment to be refunded.; No rent increases for the next three years.; To make 40% of student halls affordable, as per NUS guidelines.; No disciplinary action for protesters.; One-time £1,500 cost of living support payment.
- Methods: Demonstrations; Occupation; Rent strike; Online activism; Referendum
- Status: Ended - no demands met

Parties
Students / external activists	University of Manchester

The 2023 University of Manchester protests were a series of student protests and a rent strike at the University of Manchester in England. The protests began on 19 January 2023 and concluded on 17 December 2023.

== Background ==
The protests were a response to living conditions in university accommodation provided by the University of Manchester and to the wider cost of living crisis. The protesters' demands included a 30 per cent reduction in rent for halls of residence, a 30 per cent refund of the October payment, a freeze on rent increases for the following three years, a commitment to make 40 per cent of student halls affordable (in line with NUS guidelines), and a guarantee that no disciplinary action would be taken against the protesters. Students cited rat infestations, leaks, mould and excessive rent during the cost of living crisis as the main grievances.

The rent strike was called off on 17 December 2023. A number of university staff were injured during the protests. The local branch of the NUS had already concluded lengthy discussions with the university, which resulted in the launch of several sector-leading student support packages. Students who participated in the rent strike were fined £25 for each missed payment, though the Student Union covered most of these costs. Eleven students faced disciplinary proceedings for their alleged involvement in occupations related to the rent strike; two of these cases were dropped entirely, and the remaining students were required to write letters of apology and to watch health and safety training videos.

== Protests ==
=== Rent strike ===
On 19 January 2023, a group of 350 students from the University of Manchester withheld rent and said that they would continue to until their demands were met. The group claimed that over half a million pounds worth of rent was withheld.

The group claimed that their numbers grew to over 650 due to students joining the strike for the next rent installment which was due on 20 April 2023. They claimed this accounted for roughly £2 million being withheld from the university.

=== Occupations ===
On 8 February 2023, students in the rent strike group announced that they had occupied three University buildings; the Samuel Alexander building, the Engineering building, and the John Owens senior management building which contains the Vice-Chancellor's office. The students barricaded doors to prevent access to the building and similarly to the 2020 protests, banners were hung on the occupied buildings targeting the university and its Vice Chancellor.

On 13 February 2023, the student group also occupied the Simon Building.

Activists claimed that the University switched off heating and WiFi in the John Owens building on 15 February 2023, which was being occupied by students at the time, although there is no evidence that this was the case as these systems serve the whole complex and are impossible to isolate. Students claimed that they demanded that the heating and internet be turned back on, and left the building soon after, however this was after the University stated it would invoke disciplinary action. Damage to furniture and property was reported, as was the theft of confidential information and documents. it was claimed that locks were placed on fire exits, although the University had fully assessed fire safety and measures were in place to restrict illegal access to parts of buildings.

The University of Manchester sent a memo to staff members on 28 February 2023, stating that they aimed to remove the occupiers and start disciplinary action following the discovery of alleged illegal actions taken by the protesters. The University also started disciplinary action and sent emails to 11 students involved in the John Owens occupation the same day, saying the students broke the University's "Conduct and Discipline" regulations.

On 24 March 2023, the rent strike group posted on social media that they had occupied an out of use security office.

The students claimed that they had some presence in four buildings, including the Engineering building, the Samuel Alexander building, the John Owens Building and the Simon Building for at least 100 hours as part of the strike, although in some cases this was one person occupying a room. The Simon Building was first occupied on 13 February 2023, with those inside stating that they would not leave unless bailiffs forced them to, or the University negotiated directly with the protesters.

=== Demonstrations ===
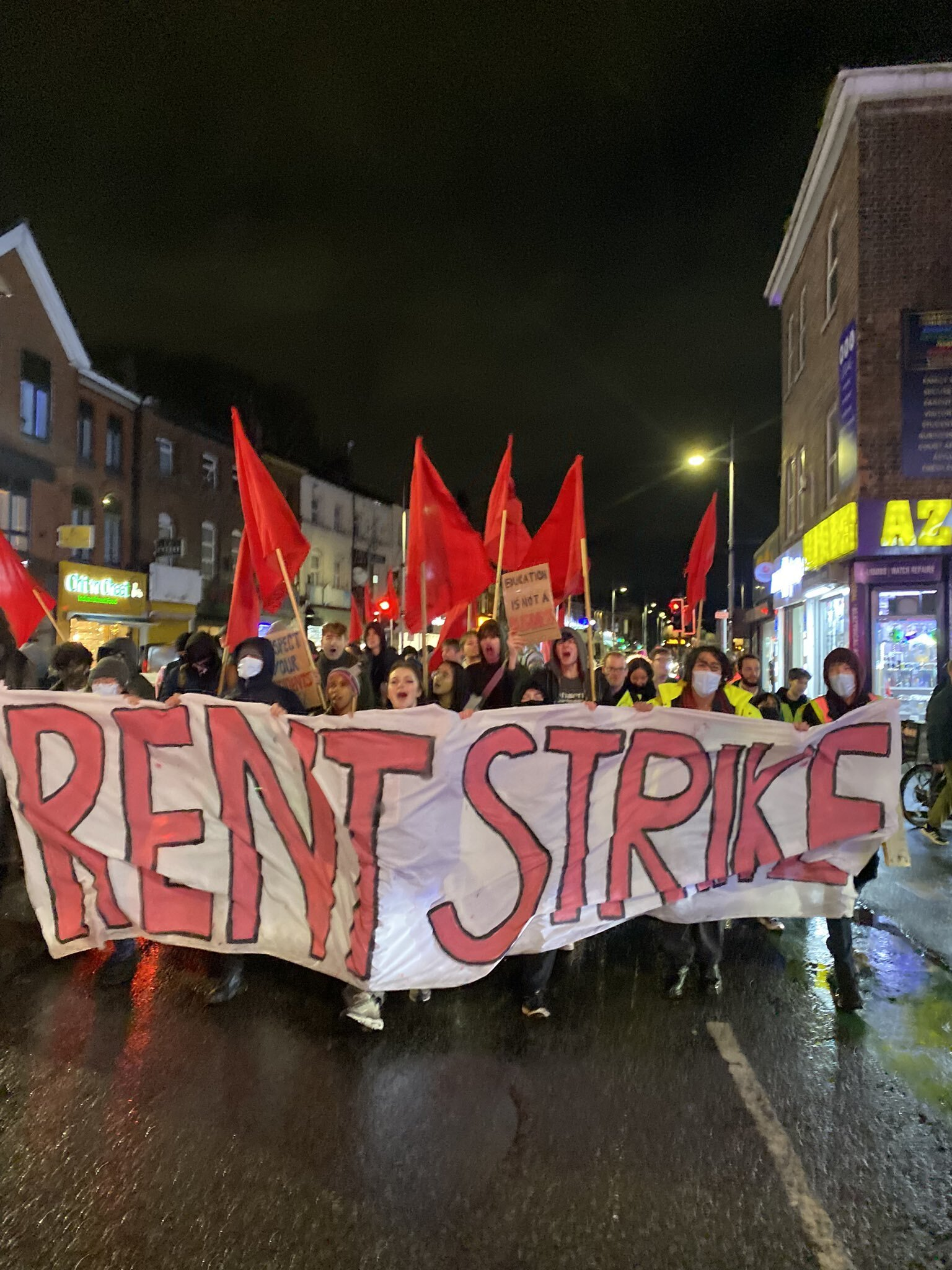
Demonstration on 1 March 2023

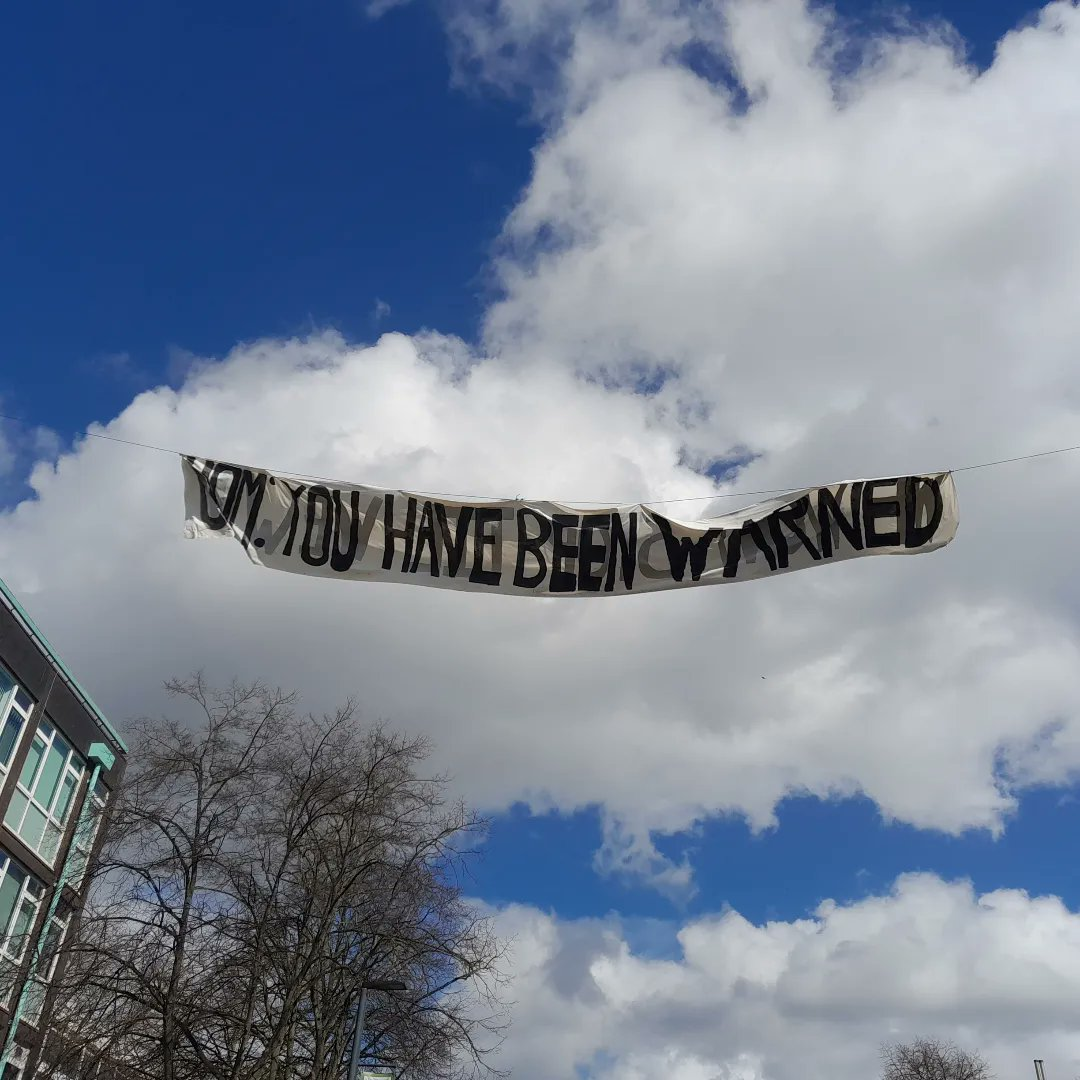
A protest banner hung between two buildings at the University of Manchester on 24 March 2023

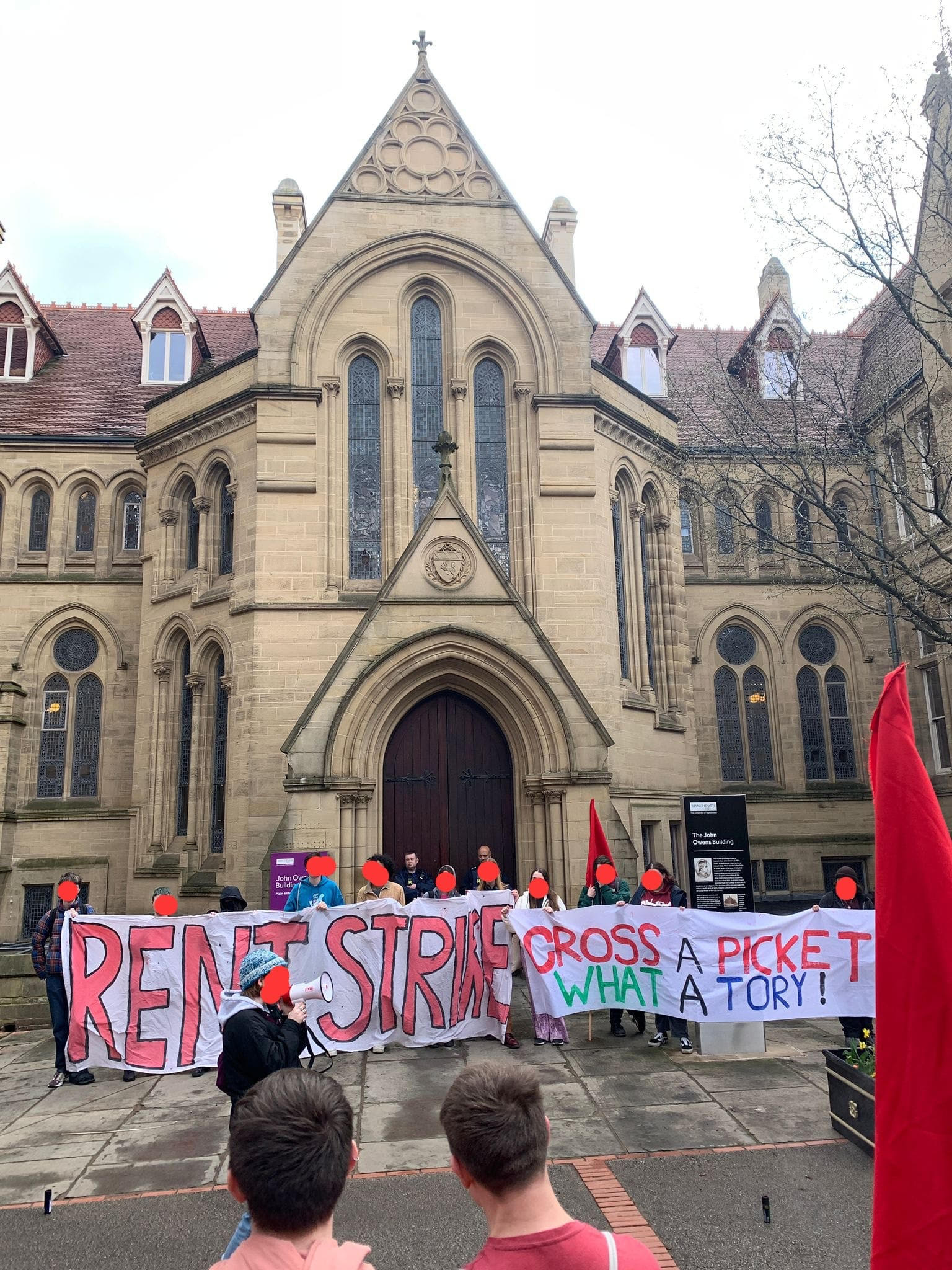
Demonstration on 24 March 2023

At 6:00 pm on 1 March 2023, protestors marched from Owens Park to the Whitworth Building arch on Oxford Road. The protest was held in support of the demands of the rent strike, the occupations, and a demand for £1,500 to be given to every student as a cost of living support package. The demonstration ended with a rally outside the then occupied Simon Building. The protestors also showed support for other activist movements including the movement to free Palestine and ACAB, which some spectators claim caused confusion.

On 21 March 2023, protesters disrupted a board of governors meeting.

On 24 March 2023, another demonstration took place. Meeting again at the Whitworth Building arch, protesters marched through the campus ending at the Simon Building which they briefly re-entered. The students at the demonstration also hung a protest banner between the Williamson and Simon buildings.

=== Referendum ===
On 3 March 2023, a petition was published and successfully reached the required 400 signatures allowing students at the University of Manchester to call for a referendum. The referendum calls for the Student Union to support the demands of the rent strike and broader cost of living support detailed in the demands of the occupation. Campaigning began on 13 March 2023 and voting took place between 20 and 23 March 2023.

On 24 March 2023, the result of the referendum was announced:

Results of referendum
Voting Option	Total	Of total (%)
Yes	10,690	95.5
No	219	2.0
Abstain	157	1.4
Total	11,196	100

Shortly after the results were released, the University of Manchester responded with claims their handling of the protests was different to other universities that take "a very hard line", while not committing to taking any action that the referendum demanded or confirming they have any further plans to resolve issues raised in the referendum.

=== End of the rent strikes ===
On 17 December 2023 it was announced that the rent strike would cease.

== Incidents ==
On 19 February 2023, the University security team called police to the Simon Building on the University of Manchester campus. Six police vans and cars arrived at the scene and refused to assist security in removing the students. Security also blocked access to and from the building including preventing students from exiting and food deliveries from arriving. The student group claimed the staff made false allegations of being assaulted, whereas the University claims security and support staff were injured. There were also claims that personal property such as towels had been stolen by security, and that food and sanitary products were being blocked from students, but these claims have not been verified. However footage of these incidents has been posted to social media.

On 9 March 2023, strikers received emails from the University of Manchester informing them that they would be fined £25 for the delay in paying rent and threatened students with third-party debt collectors if the overdue payments were not paid by 3 April 2023. On 19 April 2023, those who did not pay the January instalment of their accommodation rent were referred to the debt collection company STA Unify.

On 31 March 2023, activists claimed 'leaked' emails showed University executives looking into the financial backgrounds of students in the rent strike group. The email chain included staff looking at the accommodation the students live in, how much they cost, and which others they applied for. Students criticised the University saying that the time would be better spent negotiating.

== University response ==
=== Repossession of occupied buildings ===
The University of Manchester repeatedly asked the students to leave the building, but they refused to do so. On 15 March 2023, the University of Manchester delivered a possession order to the occupiers in the Simon Building. This gave notice to the occupiers that the university had begun the process of repossessing the building to force them to leave, citing health and safety breaches as their justification. The university was granted the possession order for the entirety of the South Campus in a court hearing at Manchester High Court on 20 March 2023.

At approximately 5:21 am on 22 March 2023, bailiffs arrived to evict occupiers from the Simon Building. Several occupiers were forcibly removed from the building by bailiffs, however no arrests or fines were carried out.

The repossession has been criticised heavily by the University of Manchester Students' Union and National Union of Students, both condemning the repossession saying that the University used "excessive force" and "violence" against occupiers.

=== Disciplinary action ===
The University started disciplinary action and sent emails to 11 students involved in the John Owens occupation on 28 February 2023. The university said the students broke the "Conduct and Discipline" regulations, and specifically caused damage to the property and injuries to staff. The students later responded claiming the accusations were false. Students are being faced with expulsion or their graduation dates being delayed.

The university's actions have been criticised as the process is disrupting the students' examination season and the student group claims the university is using them as an example to deter other students from joining the strike.

Hearings for the disciplinary action begun on 7 June 2023 and the next day there was a demonstration outside the building these hearings were taking place in.

Of the 11 students who faced disciplinary action: 2 had their cases dropped completely, and the other 9 faced minor punishments such as being required to attend a fire safety training and write apology letters to the university.

== See also ==
- 2020 University of Manchester protests, in reaction to perceived mishandling of the response to the COVID-19 pandemic
