= Thomas Wilkinson (sculptor) =

British sculptor

- Born: Thomas William Wilkinson; 18 October 1875; Bradford, England
- Died: 30 April 1950 (aged 74); Ipswich, England
- Occupation: Sculptor

Thomas William Wilkinson (18 October 1875 – 30 April 1950) was a British sculptor.

Wilkinson studied at Bradford School of Art and Ipswich School of Art. The majority of his work was of portrait heads. His work was part of the sculpture event in the art competition at the 1948 Summer Olympics. He was an associate of the Royal Society of British Sculptors and a member of Ipswich Art Club between 1907 and 1949
