= List of killings by law enforcement officers in the United States, February 2021 =

This is a list of people reported killed by non-military law enforcement officers in the United States in February 2021, whether in the line of duty or not, and regardless of reason or method. The listing documents the occurrence of a death, making no implications regarding wrongdoing or justification on the part of the person killed or officer involved. Killings are arranged by date of the incident that caused death. Different death dates, if known, are noted in the description. The table below lists 56 people.

== February 2021 ==
Date	Name (age) of deceased	Race	Location	Description
2021-02-28	Farrah Rauch (17)	White	Muskogee, Oklahoma	
2021-02-28	Fred Bowman Trundle (54)	Unknown race	Ringgold, Georgia	
2021-02-28	Jason Raymond Sugg (34)	White	Royal Oak, Michigan	
2021-02-27	Leroy Snead (67)	Unknown race	Atlanta, Georgia	
2021-02-27	David Savela (42)	White	Sebeka, Minnesota	
2021-02-27	Shannon Savela (36)	White	Sebeka, Minnesota	
2021-02-27	Jerry Lynn Roseberry (48)	White	Malone, Kentucky	
2021-02-27	Roger Dale Gibson (27)	White	Dora, Alabama	
2021-02-27	Rudy Duvivier (32)	Black	Orange Park, Florida	
2021-02-26	Isaiah Strong (41)	White	Kalispell, Montana	
2021-02-26	Frederick Earl Hight (26)	White	Empire, Alabama	
2021-02-26	Dakota G. Richards (29)	Unknown race	Stanley, Virginia	
2021-02-26	Thomas Mack (29)	White	San Antonio, Texas	
2021-02-26	Maggie A. Dickerson (29)	White	Liberty, Indiana	
2021-02-25	Shadow Ridge Stanley (20)	White	Dalton, Georgia	
2021-02-25	Benjamin Tyson (35)	Black	Baltimore, Maryland	
2021-02-25	Donald Francis Hairston (44)	Black	Culpeper, Virginia	
2021-02-25	David Joseph Wayne Conwell (37)	White	Duluth, Minnesota	
2021-02-25	Zachary Douglas Lumpkin (25)	White	Dalton, Georgia	
2021-02-25	Dino Raul Morales (28)	Hispanic	Ogden, Utah	Dino Raul Morales, a 28 year old convicted felon was fatally shot by police after leading them on a chase and then brandishing a pistol at them. He had an active warrant for armed robbery, sexual assault, and vehicle theft.
2021-02-24	Alonte Damar Murphy (22)	Black	Garden City, Michigan	
2021-02-24	Name Withheld	Unknown race	St. Michaels, Arizona	
2021-02-24	Michael Richard Stambaugh (39)	White	Vici, Oklahoma	
2021-02-24	Arturo Gomez Calel (33)	Hispanic	Antioch, California	
2021-02-23	Unnamed person	Unknown race	Ontario, California	
2021-02-23	Dale Amstutz-Dunn (39)	White	Eagle Point, Oregon	
2021-02-23	Julia Georgiadis (73)	White	Bonneau, South Carolina	
2021-02-22	Carlton James "CJ" Adams (30)	White	Nebo, North Carolina	
2021-02-21	Andrew Allen Courser (38)	White	Blanchard, Michigan	
2021-02-21	Daniel Newton Neal (37)	Black	Jacksonville, Florida	
2021-02-21	Dominic Lucas Koch (38)	White	Braham, Minnesota	
2021-02-20	Arnell States (39)	Black	Cedar Rapids, Iowa	
2021-02-20	Claude Trivino (40)	Hispanic	Albuquerque, New Mexico	
2021-02-20	Christian W. Alexander (26)	White	Lincoln, Nebraska	
2021-02-20	William Ice (38)	White	Lonoke, Arkansas	
2021-02-20	Randall Lockaby (57)	White	Villa Hills, Kentucky	
2021-02-20	Hailey Stainbrook (30)	White	Lincoln, Nebraska	
2021-02-19	Timothy Frandson (34)	White	Chillicothe, Missouri	
2021-02-19	Unnamed person	Unknown race	Costa Mesa, California	
2021-02-19	Ryan Shirey (27)	White	Catasauqua, Pennsylvania	Shirey was killed inside his home by officer Joelle Mota after police found him in his basement with an unloaded handgun.
2021-02-18	Juan Carter Hernandez (33)	Hispanic	New Wilmington, Pennsylvania	Borough police were called following a 911 call regarding a man assaulting a woman with a blunt instrument behind the house. An officer opened fire after Hernandez continued to beat Chyna Carrillo, a transgender woman originally from Arkansas. Carrillo died after being flown to a hospital, while Hernandez died at the scene.
2021-02-17	Derek Hayden (44)	White	Seattle, Washington	Port of Seattle Police called SPD officers around 9:20 p.m. to report a man in crisis wielding a knife along Alaskan Way at Seneca Street. When SPD officers arrived, they found a man with the knife who had cut himself, heading off down Alaskan Way. Officers tried to use non-lethal tools to subdue the man, but they were ineffective, according to Seattle Police. The man then came at the officers, prompting two officers to open fire, police said. The man was struck by the gunfire and died at the scene, police said.
2021-02-13	Daverion Deauntre Kinard (29)	Black	Fontana, California	Police were investigating a burglary when Kinard ran from the scene. According to body cam footage, police chased Kinard until he was found in a portable toilet. An officer shot him after he “began to roll his right hand forward toward the officer, revealing a metallic object”, according to police. Kinard was holding a lighter.
2021-02-10	Jordan Walton (21)	Black	Austin, Texas	Police were called after a report of black jeep crashing into a house. Soon after, another call was received of someone forcing them into a home. When police arrived they heard a disturbance and forced themselves inside. Jordan Walton then allegedly shot at officers and held a child hostage. He was shot by a SWAT officer.
2021-02-09	Gregory Taylor	Unknown	Seattle, Washington	A man was shot and killed by Seattle police officers near the Northwest African American Museum (NAAM) Tuesday night after an incident that left at least one other person dead, according to a statement from Seattle Police Department (SPD) released Wednesday morning. SPD wrote that “A suspect shot two victims in the 2300 block of South Massachusetts Street Tuesday night, resulting in the death of one victim and leaving the second critically injured. Officers responded and exchanged gunfire with the suspect, and the suspect died at the scene.
2021-02-08	Joseph Johnson (37)	White	Idaho Falls, Idaho	Police were searching for a man who fled a traffic stop when an officer mistook Johnson for him. An officer shot Johnson, who police say was standing in his own backyard with a gun. The actual suspect was later found in a shed in a different backyard.
2021-02-06	Anthony Steven Loia (26)	Hispanic	Long Beach, California	Shot by law enforcement near 1401 Magnolia Ave.
2021-02-05	Christopher Hagans (36)	Black	Stratford, Connecticut	Police conducted a traffic stop on Hagans, who was wanted for home invasion and strangulation. Hagans was shot after hitting a police car with his vehicle. A handgun was recovered from his car.
2021-02-05	Andrew Hogan (25)	Black	Trotwood, Ohio	Police were called after a report of shoplifting. When police arrived at Hogan's apartment, he allegedly exited holding a knife and was shot.
2021-02-05	Josue Drumond-Cruz	Hispanic	High Point, North Carolina	A standoff that started on February 4 ended when Drumond-Cruz was killed by police. Drumond-Cruz had killed a woman and wounded three officers earlier during the standoff.
2021-02-04	Jenoah Donald (30)	Black	Hazel Dell, Washington	Clark County officer Sean Boyle fired twice at Donald during a traffic stop. According to investigators, Donald and Boyle struggled inside Donald's car and Boyle fired when Donald ignored Boyle's commands to let him go. Investigators said Donald did not possess a firearm.
2021-02-02	Joshua Crites (19)	White	East Peoria, Illinois	
2021-02-01	Kevin Hayes (57)	White	Snyder, Texas	
2021-02-01	Andrew Kislek (34)	White	Tucson, Arizona	
2021-02-01	Richard Thomas (58)	White	Ruther Glen, Virginia	
2021-02-01	Sandra Birchmore (23)	White	Canton, Massachusetts	Stoughton Police Officer Matthew Farwell murdered Birchmore, who he had groomed when she was a teenager in a police explorer program. Birchmore was pregnant and incorrectly believed Farwell was the father. Farwell was convicted of murder in 2026.

== See also ==
- Death in custody § United States
- Henry A. Wallace Police Crime Public Database
- List of cases of police brutality
- List of countries with annual rates and counts for killings by law enforcement officers
- List of law enforcement officers killed in the line of duty in the United States
- List of law enforcement officers convicted for an on-duty killing in the United States
- List of shootings by US immigration agents
- List of police reforms related to the George Floyd protests
- List of unarmed African Americans killed by law enforcement officers in the United States
- Lists of killings by law enforcement officers
- Police brutality in the United States
- Police misconduct § United States
- Police riot § United States
- Police use of deadly force in the United States
