= Leonard Squirrell =

English painter

Leonard Russell Squirrell (30 October 1893 – 10 July 1979) was an English artist. He produced watercolours and etchings, and his work included images for commercial companies.

== Life ==
Squirrell was born in Ipswich, son of Frank Squirrell, a carpenter, and his wife Henrietta. In his youth he had a noted talent for drawing, and in 1908 he entered the Ipswich School of Art, studying under George Rushton. He remained there until 1916.

In 1920 Squirrell went to the Slade School of Fine Art, where he studied under Henry Tonks and Philip Wilson Steer. Later he travelled to Italy and France, and produced etchings of landscapes; at the International Print Makers Exhibitions in Los Angeles he won a silver medal in 1923, and gold medals in 1925 and 1930. From 1929 he taught etching at the Ipswich School of Art, succeeding Charles Edward Baskett, and remained there until 1940.

He lived in Ipswich for most of his life. He was a member of Ipswich Art Club from 1914 until his death, and a member and exhibitor at Norfolk & Norwich Art Circle in 1932. He was on the council of the Royal Society of Painters in Water-Colours and the Royal Society of Painter-Etchers and Engravers.

Squirrell made few oil paintings, preferring watercolour and pastels, and he exhibited in many galleries. He produced aquatints, mezzotints and drypoints. He produced railway posters, and images for many commercial companies, such as Ransomes Sims and Jefferies and Fisons. Landscape Painting in Pastel was published in 1938, and Practice in Watercolour in 1950. He continued to paint into his last years.

=== Family ===
In 1923 he married Hilda Bird, and they had a daughter and a son. Their son Martin Squirrell (1926–1950) had three works exhibited at the Royal Academy in 1943, and became art editor of the East Anglian Magazine.
