= Alison Uttley =

English children's writer (1884–1976)

- Born: Alice Jane Taylor; 17 December 1884; Cromford, Derbyshire, England
- Died: 7 May 1976 (aged 91); High Wycombe, Buckinghamshire, England
- Monuments: Blue plaque
- Education: Lea School; Lady Manners School
- Alma mater: Manchester University; Cambridge Training College for Women
- Occupations: Teacher; Author
- Notable work: Little Grey Rabbit
- Spouse: James Uttley (m. 1911; died 1930)
- Children: 1
- Awards: Honorary Doctor of Letters, Manchester University

Alison Jane Uttley (née Taylor; 17 December 1884 – 7 May 1976) was an English writer of over 100 books. She is best known for a children's series about Little Grey Rabbit and Sam Pig. She is also remembered for a pioneering time slip novel for children, A Traveller in Time, about the imprisoned Mary, Queen of Scots.

== Life ==
Born in Cromford and brought up on a farm in rural Derbyshire, Alison Taylor was educated at the Lea School in Holloway and the Lady Manners School in Bakewell, where she developed a love for science that led to a scholarship to Manchester University to read physics. In 1906 she became the second woman honours graduate of the university and made a lifetime friendship with the charismatic Professor Samuel Alexander.

After university, Alison Taylor trained as a teacher at the Cambridge Training College for Women (now Hughes Hall, Cambridge). In 1908, she became the physics mistress at Fulham County Grammar School (later Fulham Cross Girls' School) in Fulham, west London – the year the school opened. Around 1910 she was living at The Old Vicarage, King Street, Knutsford. In 1911 she married James Arthur Uttley. In 1914 she had her only child, John Corin Uttley, who became a public schoolmaster. James Uttley was prone to depression and drowned himself in the River Mersey in 1930. In 1978, two years after his mother's death, John Corin Uttley, too, killed himself by driving over a cliff.

From 1924 to 1938, the Uttleys lived at Downs House, 13 Higher Downs, Bowdon, Cheshire, which has a blue plaque commemorating her. In 1938 she moved to Beaconsfield, also the home of children's author Enid Blyton, whom Uttley did not admire. She also had a difficult relationship with the illustrator of her Little Grey Rabbit books, Margaret Tempest.

== Writing career ==
In later life Uttley said that she began writing to support herself and her son financially after she was widowed, but in fact her first book was published in 1929, before her husband's death. Uttley recorded that one inspiration was a meeting in 1927 with Professor Alexander at a painting exhibition in Altrincham, at which he confused her with another ex-student and asked if she was still writing. Her first books were a series of tales about animals, including Little Grey Rabbit, the Little Red Fox, Sam Pig and Hare. She later wrote for older children and adults, particularly focusing on rural topics, notably in The Country Child (1931), a fictionalized account of childhood experiences at her family farm home, Castle Top Farm, near Cromford.

One of her most popular works is A Traveller in Time (1939). Based on the Babington Plot of Anthony Babington at Dethick, near her family home, this romance mixes dream and historical fact in a story of a 20th-century girl transported to the 16th century, becoming involved in a plot to free Mary, Queen of Scots from nearby Wingfield Manor. Uttley later lived in Beaconsfield, in a house named Thackers after the house in the book. In January 1978 BBC TV showed the five-part series A Traveller in Time based on Uttley's story. It starred a 15-year-old newcomer, Sophie Thompson, and a rising star, Simon Gipps-Kent.

== Legacy ==
In 1970 the University of Manchester awarded Uttley an honorary degree of Doctor of Letters for her literary work. In 2021, the university named one of its halls of residence Uttley House in her honour.

In 2009 Uttley's private diaries were published, and she has been the subject of two biographies.

== Works ==
=== Novels ===
- Moonshine and Magic (1932)
- The Adventures of Peter and Judy in Bunnyland (1935)
- Mustard, Pepper and Salt (1938)
- High Meadows (1938)
- A Traveller in Time (1939)
- Cuckoo Cherry-Tree (1943)
- Mrs Nimble and Mr Bumble (1944)
- When All is Done (1945)
- The Washerwoman's Child: A Play on the Life and Stories of Hans Christian Andersen (1946)
- John at the Old Farm (1960)
- The Mouse, the Rabbit and the Little White Hen (1966)
- Enchantment (1966)

=== Short story collections ===
- Candlelight Tales (1936)
- Nine Starlight Tales (1942)
- Ten Candlelight Tales (selections from "Candlelight Tales") (1942)
- The Spice Woman's Basket and Other Tales (1944)
- Some Moonshine Tales (1945)
- The Weather Cock and Other Stories (1945)
- John Barleycorn: Twelve Tales of Fairy and Magic (1948)
- The Cobbler's Shop and Other Tales (1950)
- Magic in My Pocket: A Selection of Tales (1957)
- The Little Knife Who Did All the Work: Twelve Tales of Magic (1962)
- Lavender Shoes: Eight Tales of Enchantment (1970)

=== Anthologies ===
- Fairy Tales (edited by Kathleen Lines, 1975)
- Stories for Christmas (chosen by Kathleen Lines, 1977)
- From Spring to Spring: Stories of the Four Seasons (edited by Kathleen Lines, 1978)
- Foxglove Tales (edited by Lucy Meredith, 1984)

=== Memoirs and essays ===
- The Country Child (1931)
- Ambush of Young Days (1937)
- The Farm on the Hill (1941)
- Country Hoard (1943)
- Country Things (1946)
- Carts and Candlesticks (1948)
- Macduff (1950)
- Plowmen's Clocks (1952)
- The Stuff of Dreams (1953)
- Here's a New Day (1956)
- A Year in the Country (1957)
- The Swans Fly Over (1959)
- Something for Nothing (1960)
- Wild Honey (1962)
- Cuckoo in June (1964)
- A Peck of Gold (1966)
- The Button-Box and Other Essays (1968)
- A Ten O'Clock Scholar and Other Essays (1970)
- Secret Places and Other Essays (1972)
- Country World: Memoirs of Childhood (Edited by Lucy Meredith; 1984)

=== Others ===
- Buckinghamshire (1950)
- Recipes From an Old Farmhouse (1966)

=== As editor ===
- In Praise of Country Life: An Anthology (1949)

=== "Sam Pig" books ===
- Tales of the Four Pigs and Brock the Badger (1939)
- The Adventures of Sam Pig (1940)
- Sam Pig Goes to Market (1941)
- Six Tales of Brock the Badger (1941)
- Six Tales of Sam Pig (1941)
- Six Tales of the Four Pigs (1941)
- Sam Pig and Sally (1942)
- Sam Pig at the Circus (1943)
- Sam Pig in Trouble (1948)
- Yours Ever, Sam Pig (1951)
- Sam Pig and the Singing Gate (1955)
- Sam Pig Goes to the Seaside (1960)
- The Sam Pig Storybook (1965)

=== "Tim Rabbit" books ===
- The Adventures of No Ordinary Rabbit (1937)
- Ten Tales of Tim Rabbit (1941)
- Adventures of Tim Rabbit (1945)
- Tim Rabbit and Company (1959)
- Tim Rabbit's Dozen (1964)

=== "Little Brown Mouse" books ===
- Snug and Serena Meet a Queen (1950)
- Snug and Serena Pick Cowslips (1950)
- Going to the Fair (1951)
- Toad's Castle (1951)
- Mrs Mouse Spring-Cleans (1952)
- Christmas at the Rose and Crown (1952)
- The Gypsy Hedgehogs (1953)
- Snug and the Chimney-Sweeper (1953)
- The Mouse Telegrams (1955)
- The Flower Show (1955)
- Snug and the Silver Spoon (1957)
- Mr Stoat Walks In (1957)
- Snug and Serena Count Twelve (1959)
- Snug and Serena Go to Town (1961)
- The Brown Mouse Book: Magical Tales of Two Little Mice (1971)

=== "Little Red Fox" books ===
- Little Red Fox and the Wicked Uncle (1954)
- Little Red Fox and Cinderella (1956)
- Little Red Fox and the Magic Moon (1958)
- Little Red Fox and the Unicorn (1962)
- The Little Red Fox and the Big Big Tree (1968)

=== "Grey Rabbit" books ===
[Please note that in the 1960s many of the earlier books in the series were abridged in order to reduce them to a standard 64-page format. Generally this was achieved by condensing the text into fewer pages and by the removal of a few illustrations, but in a few instances the text was also abridged. No mention of such alteration was ever given in the publication details. Little Grey Rabbit's Christmas was one of the worst affected with the loss of thirteen illustrations when reduced from its original 105 pages.]

- The Squirrel, the Hare and the Little Grey Rabbit (1929)
- How Little Grey Rabbit Got Back Her Tail (1930)
- The Great Adventure of Hare (1931)
- The Story of Fuzzypeg the Hedgehog (1932)
- Squirrel Goes Skating (1934)
- Wise Owl's Story (1935)
- Little Grey Rabbit's Party (1936)
- The Knot Squirrel Tied (1937)
- Fuzzypeg Goes to School (1938)
- Little Grey Rabbit's Christmas (1939)
- My Little Grey Rabbit Painting Book (1940)
- Moldy Warp the Mole (1940)
- Hare Joins the Home Guard (1942)
- Little Grey Rabbit's Washing-Day (1942)
- Water-Rat's Picnic (1943)
- Little Grey Rabbit's Birthday (1944)
- The Speckledy Hen (1945)
- Little Grey Rabbit to the Rescue (play; 1946)
- Little Grey Rabbit and the Weasels (1947)
- Little Grey Rabbit and the Wandering Hedgehog (1948)
- Little Grey Rabbit Makes Lace (1950)
- Hare and the Easter Eggs (1952)
- Little Grey Rabbit's Valentine (1953)
- Little Grey Rabbit Goes to the Sea (1954)
- Hare and Guy Fawkes (1956)
- Little Grey Rabbit's Paint-Box (1958)
- Little Grey Rabbit Finds a Shoe (1960)
- Little Grey Rabbit and the Circus (1961)
- Three Little Grey Rabbit Plays (The Grey Rabbit's Hospital, The Robber, and A Christmas Story; 1961)
- Grey Rabbit's May Day (1963)
- Hare Goes Shopping (1965)
- Little Grey Rabbit's Pancake Day (1967)
- Little Grey Rabbit Goes to the North Pole (1970)
- Fuzzypeg's Brother (1971)
- Little Grey Rabbit's Spring Cleaning Party (1972)
- Little Grey Rabbit and the Snow-Baby (1973)
- Hare and the Rainbow (1975)
