= Occupation (protest) =

Type of protest

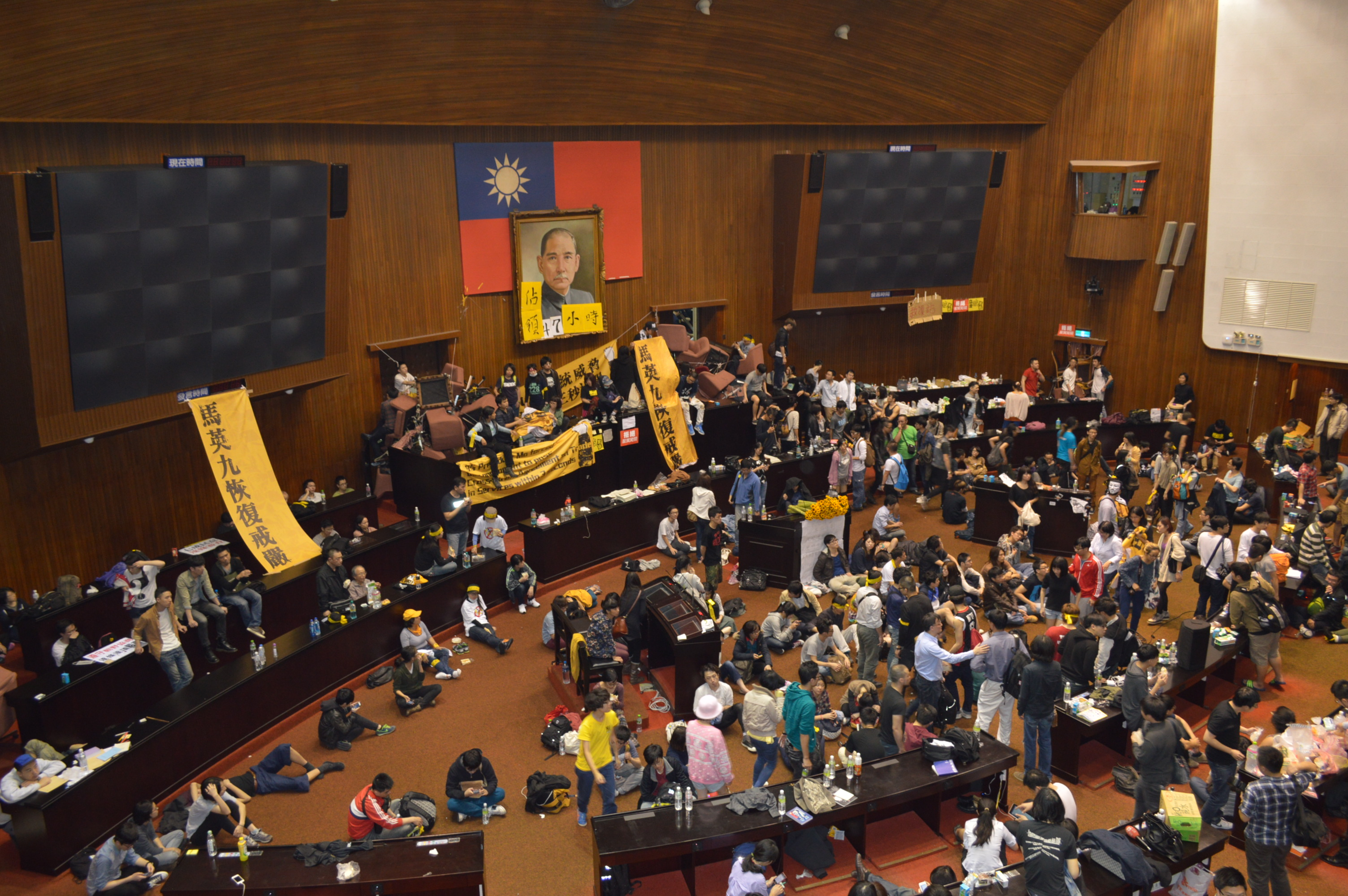
Taiwan students occupying the Legislative Yuan, 2014

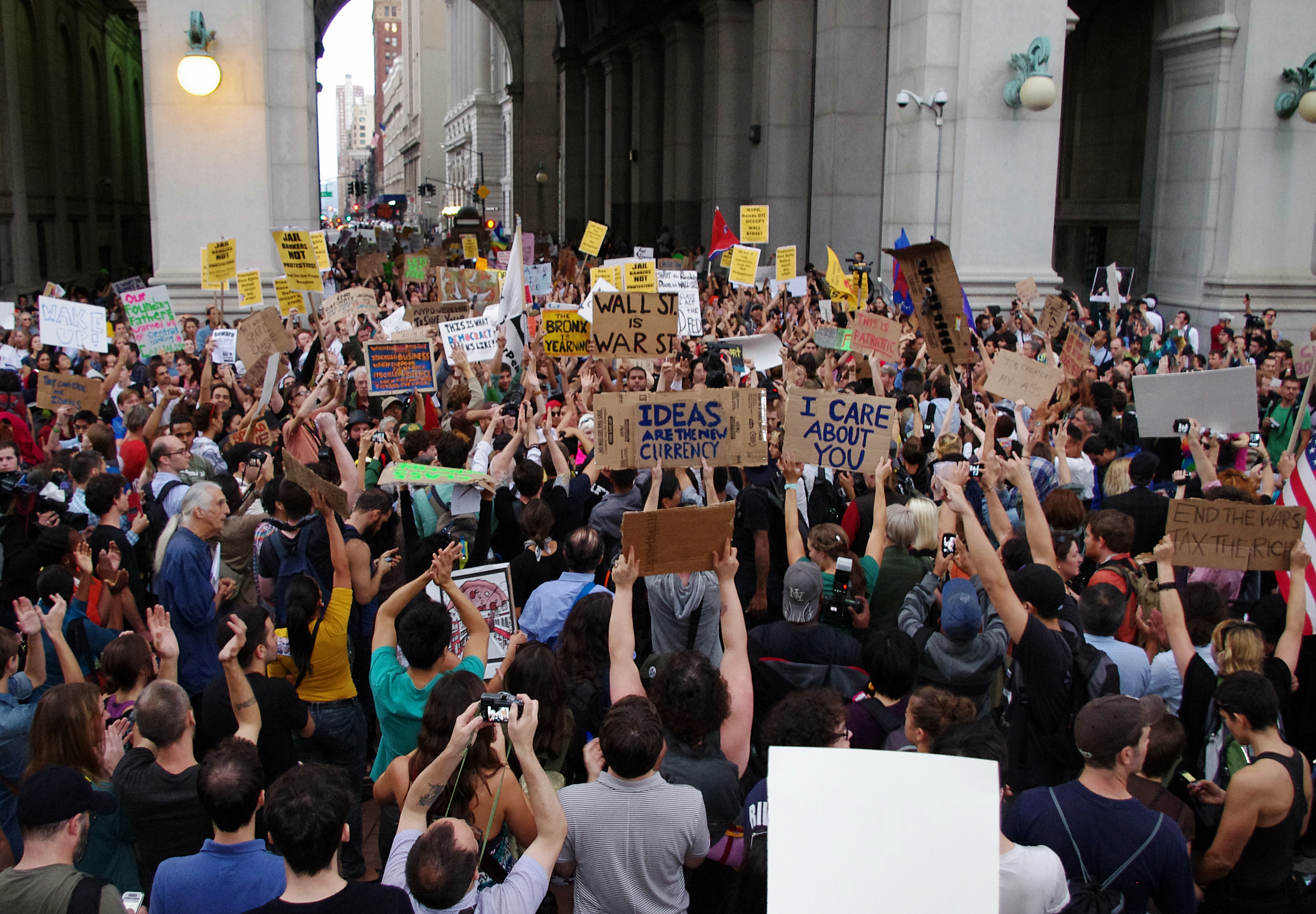
Americans during the 2011 Occupy Wall Street movement in Zuccotti Park, New York City

As an act of protest, occupation is a strategy often used by social movements and other forms of collective social action in order to squat and hold public and symbolic spaces, buildings, critical infrastructure such as entrances to train stations, shopping centers, university buildings, squares, and parks. Occupation attempts to use space as an instrument in order to achieve political and economic change, and to construct counter-spaces in which protesters express their desire to participate in the production and re-imagination of urban space. Often, this is connected to the right to the city, which is the right to inhabit and be in the city as well as to redefine the city in ways that challenge the demands of capitalist accumulation. That is to make public spaces more valuable to the citizens in contrast to favoring the interests of corporate and financial capital.

Unlike other forms of protest like demonstrations, marches and rallies, occupation is defined by an extended temporality and is usually located in specific places. In many cases local governments declare occupations illegal because protesters seek to control space over a prolonged time. As such, occupations are often in conflict with political authorities and forces of established order, especially the police. These confrontations in particular attract media attention.

Occupation, as a means of achieving change, emerged from worker struggles that sought everything from higher wages to the abolition of capitalism. Often called a sit-down strike, it is a form of civil disobedience in which an organized group of workers, usually employed at a factory or other centralized location, take possession of the workplace by "sitting down" at their stations, effectively preventing their employers from replacing them with strikebreakers or, in some cases, moving production to other locations.

The recovered factories in Argentina are an example of workplace occupations moving beyond addressing workplace grievances, to demanding a change in ownership of the means of production.

Another example was when workers in Sydney, Australia occupied and ran the Harco Steel Factory in 1971 for four weeks after the owner laid off employees. With the workplace under their control, they introduced the 35-hour working week.

The Industrial Workers of the World were the first American union to use it, while the United Auto Workers staged successful sit-down strikes in the 1930s, most famously in the Flint Sit-Down Strike of 1936–1937. Sit-down strikes were declared illegal by the United States Supreme Court, but are still used by unions such as the UMWA in the Pittston strike, and the workers at the Republic Windows and Doors factory in Chicago.

The Occupy Wall Street movement, inspired amongst others by the Arab Spring and the Indignados movement of Spain, started a global movement in which the occupation of public spaces is a key tactic. During these protests in 2011, the tactic of occupation was used in a new way as protesters wanted to remain indefinitely until they were heard, resisting police and government officials who wanted to evict them. In contrast to earlier protest encampments, these occupations mobilized more people during a longer time period in more cities. This gained them worldwide attention.

== Notable protest occupations ==
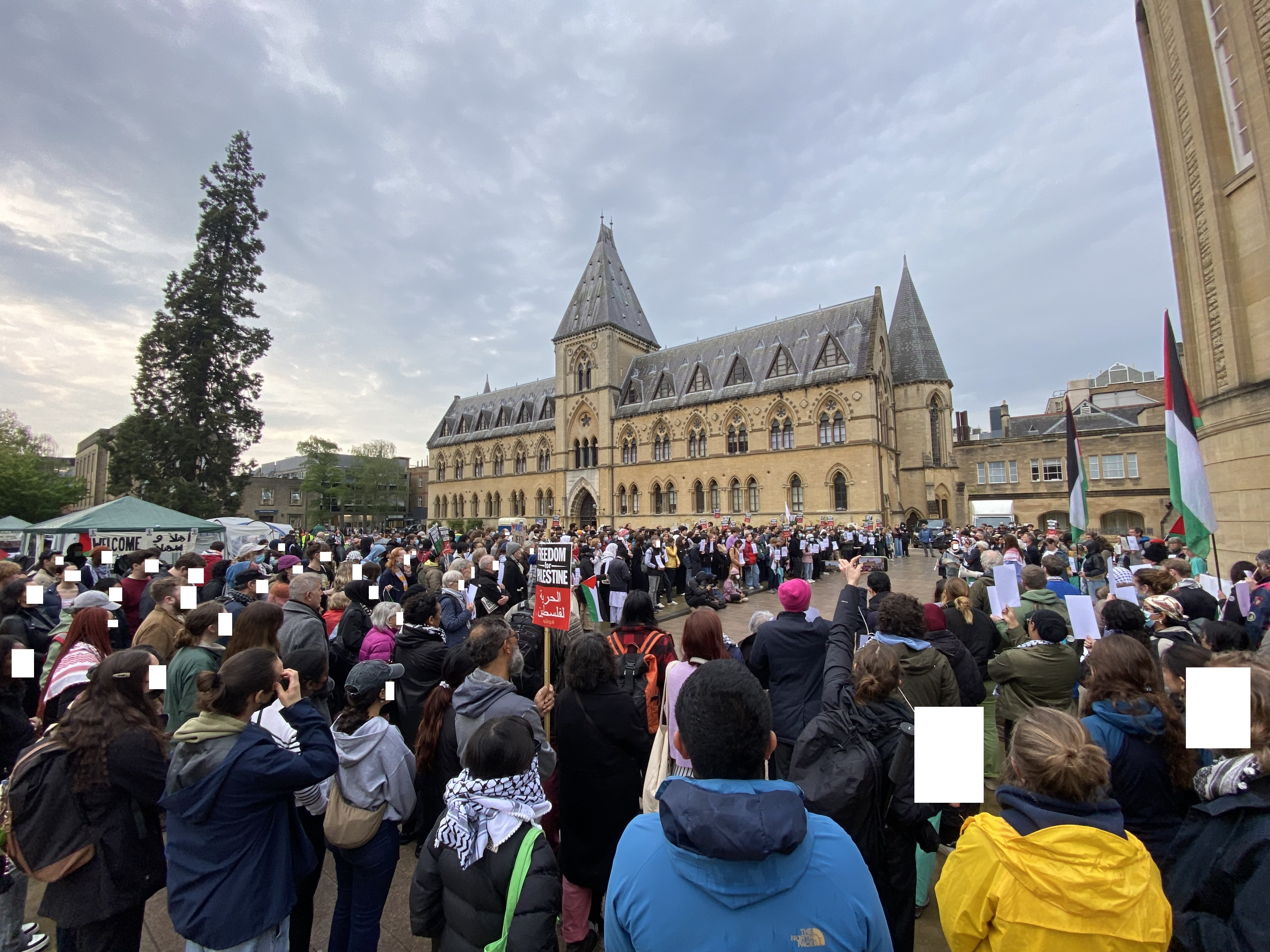
First day of the Oxford 2024 Palestinian solidarity encampment

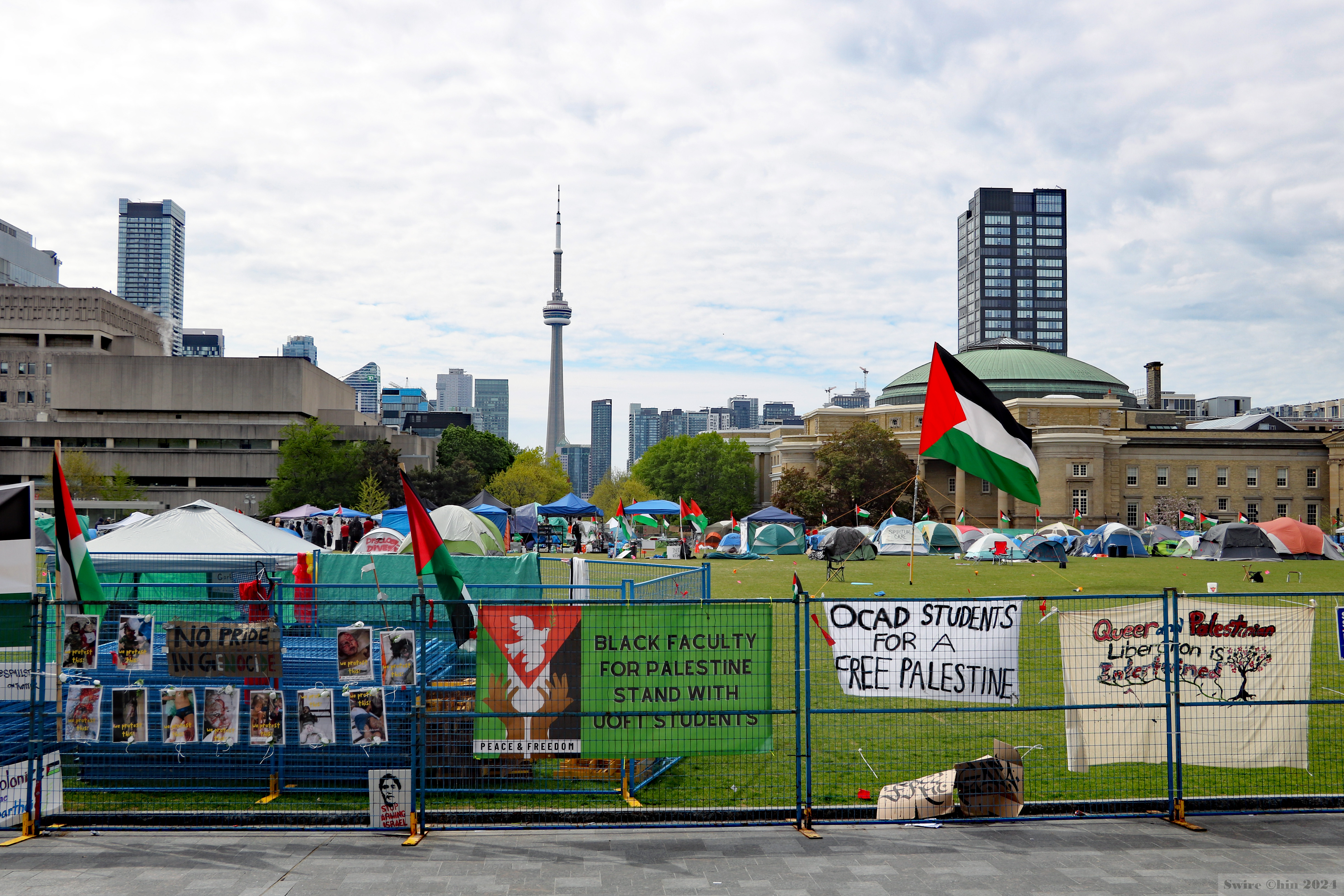
University of Toronto pro-Palestinian encampment in May 2024

- 2025 Turkish Protests. Protests began throughout Turkey on 19 March 2025 following the detention and arrest of Istanbul mayor Ekrem İmamoğlu and more than 100 other opposition members and protesters by Turkish authorities. The gatherings represented significant public opposition to what participants characterized as politically motivated legal actions against İmamoğlu, who was the primary opposition candidate for the 2028 Turkish presidential election and Turkish president Recep Tayyip Erdoğan's main political rival.
- 2024–2025 Serbian anti-corruption protests
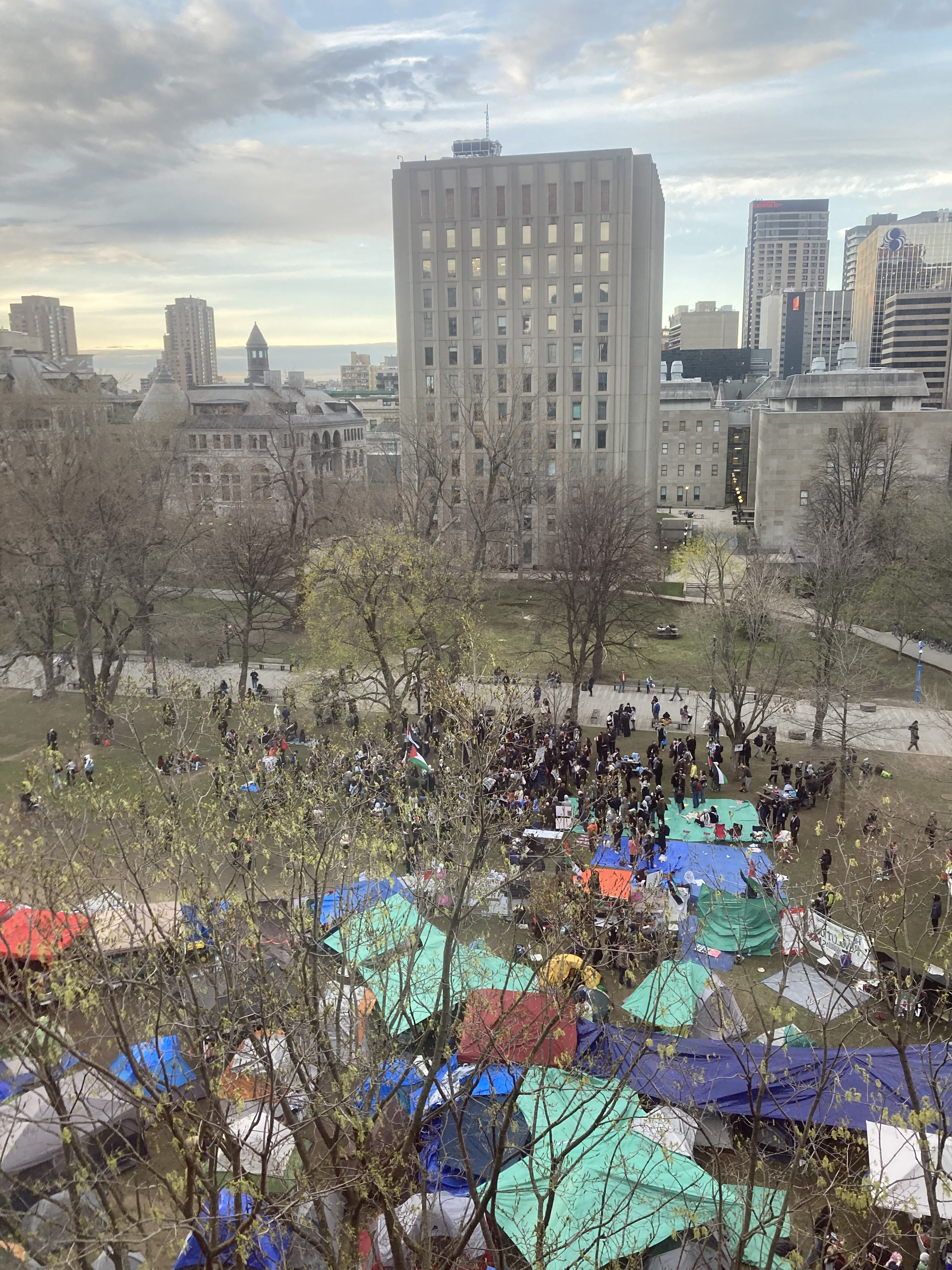
- Pro-Palestine encampment at McGill university, seen from McLennan Library
  2024 pro-Palestinian protests on university campuses
- 2023 University of Manchester protests including ongoing student occupations of university buildings in protest of the marketisation of higher education
- 2023 storming of the Praça dos Três Poderes
- 2022 Parker K-8 Occupation in the Oakland Unified School District, Oakland, California; 130-day occupation of an OUSD school to protest its closure
- Freedom Convoy 2022 across Canada
- 2021 Uptown Minneapolis unrest in the U.S. state of Minnesota
- 2021 Orisha Land following police brutality in Austin, Texas, United States
- 2021 storming of the United States Capitol
- 2020 Capitol Hill Autonomous Zone (CHAZ) following the George Floyd protests in the U.S. city of Seattle
- 2020–present George Floyd Square occupied protest in the U.S. city of Minneapolis
- 2018 UCU Strike Solidarity Occupations. Student occupations took place on over 20 UK university campuses and the UUK London Offices in support of the 4-week UCU national strike over a pensions dispute. Some occupations lasted for over a month and continued after the strike had ended, calling for an end to the neo-liberalisation and marketisation of higher education and in support of the rights of low-income workers at universities such as cleaners and security guards.
- 2017 Reclaim The City in the South African city of Cape Town. Anti-poverty activists occupied disused properties.
- 2015 Occupy LSE, a six-week occupation against the neoliberalisation of LSE and the UK Higher Education system.
- 2015 University of Amsterdam Bungehuis and Maagdenhuis Occupations, a protest against budget cuts and for more democracy in the university.
- 2014 Hong Kong protests, an occupation protest for universal suffrage in Hong Kong in 2014
- The occupation of the Legislative Yuan of Republic of China (Taiwan) in 2014 as part of the Sunflower Student Movement.
- The 2014 pro-Russian unrest in Ukraine.
- Gezi park protests a wave of demonstrations and civil unrest in Turkey began on 28 May 2013, initially to contest the urban development plan for Istanbul's Gezi Park. The protests were sparked by outrage at the violent eviction of a sit-in at the park protesting the plan.
- The several massive occupations of unproductive land in Brazil by the largest mass movement of the world, the Movimento dos Trabalhadores Rurais Sem Terra, from 1973 up to now.
- The 2011–2012 Spanish protests
- The occupation of the Wisconsin State Capitol in Madison, Wisconsin in February 2011 as part of the 2011 Wisconsin protests over labor rights, a precursor to the Occupy Wall Street movement.
- Occupy Wall Street, which helped spawn the worldwide Occupy movement
- Tahrir Square during the 2011 Egyptian revolution
- The occupation of some university buildings in the UK in November 2010 and early 2011 in response to cuts by the coalition Conservative-Liberal Democrat government including those to public services, welfare handouts and all levels of education (notably the increase of tuition fees in combination to funding cuts).
- The tent city known as "Democracy Village" erected in Parliament Square in London, in 2010.
- The wave of Student Occupations at universities in the UK in early 2009.
- The occupations of university buildings during the 2009 California college tuition hike protests.
- The flux of student occupations at universities in New York City over the 2008-9 year, including NYU and The New School.
- The February 2008 occupation of Symphony Way by the Symphony Way Pavement Dwellers after the largest home invasion in South Africa's history. Residents occupied the main thoroughfare for 1 year and 9 months.
- The occupation of Oaxaca City for 150 days during the 2006 Oaxaca protests.
- The 2005 Cedar Revolution
- The 2001 Central University of Venezuela rectorate takeover
- 1996–1997 Serbian protests
- The 1990 Wild Lily student movement
- The Tiananmen Square protests of 1989.
- The Greenham Common Women's Peace Camp in England which began protesting the placement of nuclear-armed cruise missiles in 1981.
- The American Indian Movement occupation at Wounded Knee, South Dakota (1973)
- The 1969 occupation of Alcatraz by American Indians.
- The 1969 occupation of City College by a group consisting largely of Black and Puerto Rican students that demanded and won open admissions at CUNY.
- The 1969 student occupation of the computer centre at Sir George Williams University in Montreal.
- 1968 student demonstrations in Yugoslavia
- The 1968 Columbia Student Strike.
- The 1968 Poor People's Campaign, organized (shortly before his assassination) by Martin Luther King Jr. and the Southern Christian Leadership Conference occupation of the National Mall.
- 13 May 1968 - Sorbonne Occupation Committee at the Sorbonne University in Paris
- 22 March 1968 - Movement of 22 March Occupation of Nanterre University
- The 1936-37 GM Sit-Down Strike, in Flint, Michigan.
- The 1932 Bonus Army occupation camp of World War I veterans and their families in Washington, D.C.

== Tactics ==
- Peace camps conducted on disputed territory, such as at Camp Humphreys
- Sit-down strikes
- Sit-ins

== See also ==
- Squatting
