= Owens Park =

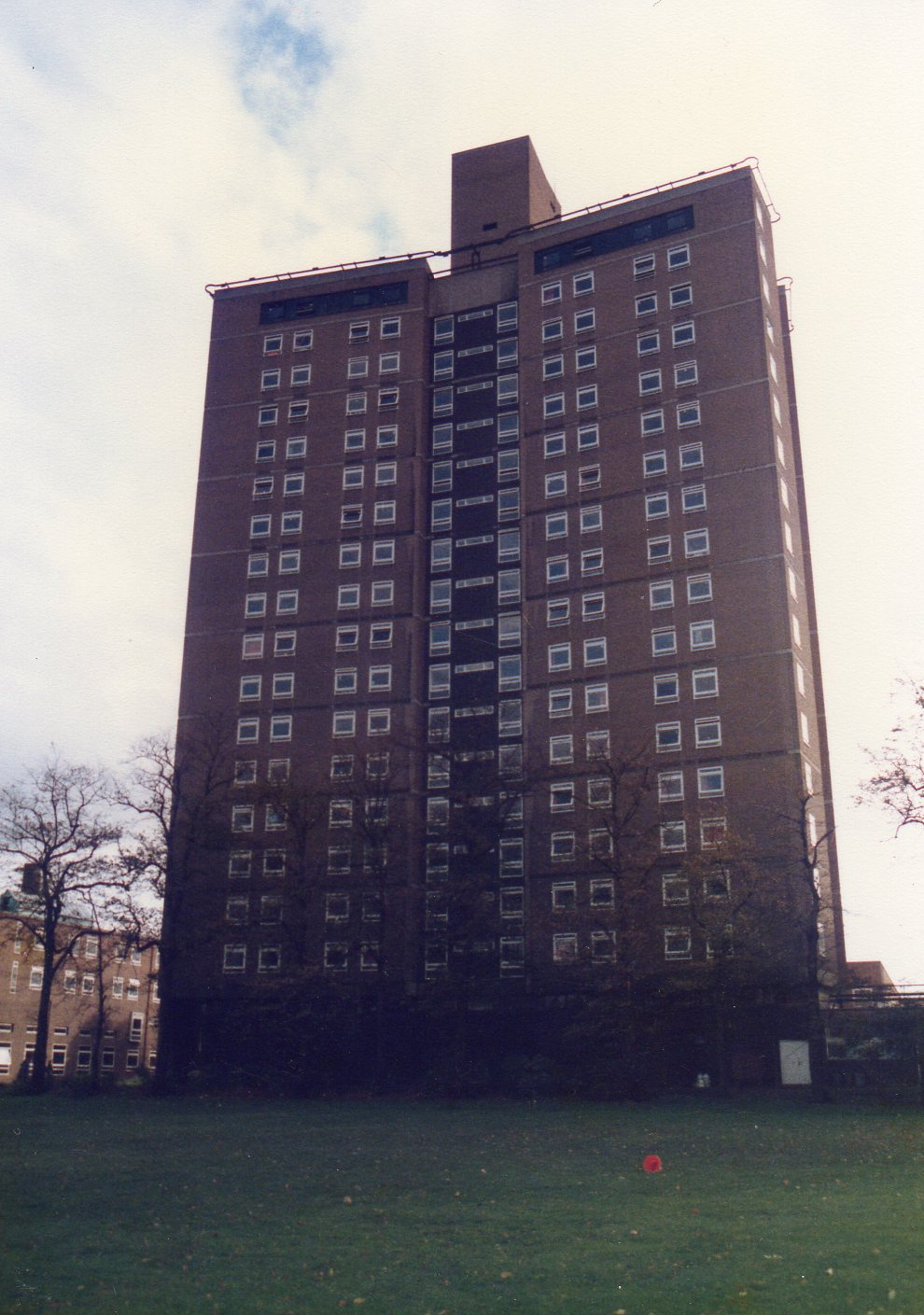
- Owens Park Tower Block in 1985

General information
- Location: 293 Wilmslow Road, Fallowfield, Manchester
- Coordinates: 53°26′42″N 2°13′02″W
- Construction started: 1964
- Completed: 1966
- Closed: 2021
- Demolished: 2025
- Owner: University of Manchester

Height
- Height: 61 metres (200 ft)

Technical details
- Floor count: 19

Design and construction
- Architect: Building Design Partnership

Owens Park was a large hall of residence located in the Fallowfield district of the city of Manchester, England. The site is owned by the University of Manchester and housed 1,056 students. Owens Park is a significant part of the Fallowfield Campus of the University of Manchester. The terms 'Owens Park' and 'Fallowfield Campus' are sometimes used interchangeably. The first phase was completed in 1964 and the second in 1965.

The tower was vacated in 2021 and demolition completed in 2025.

== History ==
The hall, designed by Building Design Partnership, and built in 1964–66, was most notable for its 61-metre-high (200 ft) tower, which had become a local landmark. It had a fibreglass relief, Cosmos I, by Mitzi Cunliffe, at the base.

A 2001 plan by the University of Manchester to demolish the tower in 2004 was subsequently abandoned as a result of protests by current and past residents. In 2005 a refurbishment programme was planned. It was announced in 2014 that Owens Park was due to be demolished as part of the plans to redevelop the Fallowfield Campus with brand new student accommodation.

In 2021, the halls closed as part of a wider ongoing regeneration of the Fallowfield Campus, with the halls delisted for incoming students beginning that year. In early 2024, planning permission for the £400m redevelopment was given the green light, and it was confirmed that Owens Park would be demolished. Demolition work began in 2024 and was completed in 2025.

== Organisation ==
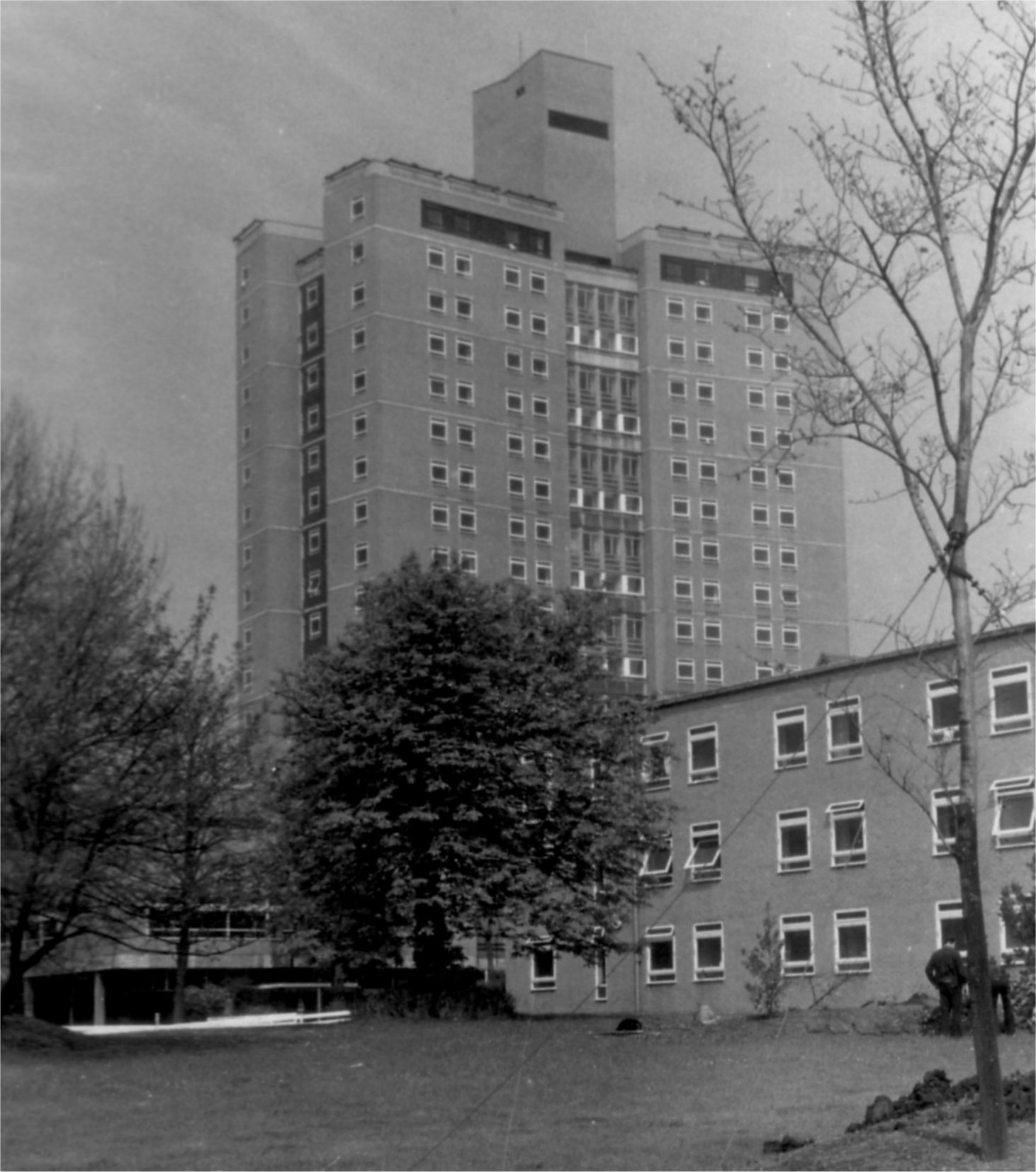
Owens Park in 1975

Owens Park comprised five main residential blocks (Tower, Tree Court, Green Court, Little Court, and the Mall), an entertainment block (referred to as "The OP"), where the weekly Owens Park BOP ('Big Old Party') used to take place, and an administration/library block. It also contained a computer cluster available to all students of the University.

Standard plans of an Owens Park Tower 'House' with room numbering. Occupants of House 3 1968-9

Tower House Common Room and balcony 2020

The residential blocks were internally sub-divided into 'houses', each housing approximately 30-40 students. In the past, Tree Court was exclusively female, whilst the other blocks housed only male students. All block were of mixed sex, though any given floor in a house was single sex with exception to the tower. Each house had a supervising tutor and a common room. Each floor in a house had its own bathroom and kitchen. The halls were catered during the week.

There were generally rivalries between adjacent houses and other halls of residence, these were contested in sporting events such as football as each halls of residence generally have a team. Football matches are held each Wednesday and the occasional Saturday (for cup matches).

Owens Park Students' Association (OPSA) organised leisure and sporting activities, and was run by a committee formed of students who lived the hall.

== Notable residents ==
Radiohead guitarist Ed O'Brien was a resident during his time at university in Manchester, as was Rik Mayall. The Chemical Brothers played their first gig at the Owens Park BOP. The comedian Jack Whitehall also lived in the Tower, where also the actor Benedict Cumberbatch stayed. Other residents included Peter Hammill and Chris Judge Smith who formed Van der Graaf Generator in 1967 while living there.

== The BOP ==
Prior to September 2009 Owens Park BOP (Big Old Party) was a night held in Owens Park every Friday in the Owens Park tower's ballroom for students of the University of Manchester. The BOP generally had a theme and from September 2008 charged £1 entry to residents, which had caused some outrage amongst residents as previously it had been free. It had a charge of £3.50 for all other entrants. Only students were allowed to enter the BOP and a student card must have been presented upon entry.

The BOP was a popular student night out due to its low cost of drinks and transport as most of the BOP's customers were residents of local student halls of residence. However, Owens Park residents had been known to have become disgruntled both at the terrible music often played by the DJs and the students from other halls of residence coming to the event with the large queues this created to gain access.

The BOP usually had a theme each week such as a western theme or a dead celebrity theme causing large numbers of students to dress up for the occasion.

The BOP was set out very much like a classic school disco except with the inclusion of the sale of alcohol. As a customer entered they were greeted with the main tower bar with its own DJ and a vast amount of seating; however, the main draw of the BOP lay in the large hall upstairs. Upstairs there was a second bar and a foyer-like drinking area, and next door there was a large conference hall. The large hall had a disco-like atmosphere and professional DJ on the stage, with small amounts of seating at the sides. The BOP was generally open from 8 pm till around 2 am; however, times had been known to vary.

The BOP was run by the Owens Park Student's Association Executive Committee (OPSA). The Committee is also in charge of running all other hall activities such as the pub quiz, karaoke, sports, and hall pub and club outings.

The BOP is known on a larger scale for being the venue of the Chemical Brothers' first gig.

After its 2009 move to a pub outside Fallowfield, the Jabez Clegg, attendances steadily declined. Following many rumours, the last BOP took place on 25 January 2013, bringing an end to its 47-year run.
