= Hinchley =

Hinchley may refer to:

== Places ==
- Hinchley Wood, an English suburban village inside Surrey

== People ==
- Albert Hinchley, English footballer
- Edith Mary Hinchley, British painter
- Gary Hinchley, English footballer
- John Hinchley, chemical engineer
- Pippa Hinchley, English actress
- Tamsin Hinchley, Australian volleyball player
