= Institution of Chemical Engineers =

International professional institution

- Abbreviation: IChemE
- Formation: 1922; 104 years ago
- Legal status: Registered charity
- Purpose: Chemical engineering, pharmaceuticals and biotechnology worldwide
- Headquarters: Railway Terrace, Rugby, UK
- Location(s): Offices in Australia, Malaysia, New Zealand, Singapore and the UK.
- Region served: Worldwide
- Members: 32,000
- President: Ollie Folayan MBE
- Main organ: IChemE Board of Trustees
- Affiliations: European Federation of Chemical Engineering (EFCE) and Asia Pacific Confederation of Chemical Engineering (APCChE)
- Budget: £8.64 million
- Website: icheme.org

The Institution of Chemical Engineers (IChemE) is a global professional engineering institution with 30,000 members in 114 countries. It was founded in 1922 and awarded a Royal Charter in 1957.

The Institution has offices in Rugby, London, Melbourne, Wellington, New Zealand and Kuala Lumpur.

== History ==
In 1881, George E. Davis proposed the formation of a Society of Chemical Engineers, but instead the Society of Chemical Industry (SCI) was formed.

The First World War required a huge increase in chemical production to meet the needs of the munitions and its supply industries, including a twenty-fold increase in explosives. This brought a number of chemical engineers into high positions within the Ministry of Munitions, notably K. B. Quinan, Frederic Nathan and Arthur Duckham.

The increased public perception of chemical engineers renewed the interest in a society, and in 1918 John Hinchley, who was a Council Member of the SCI, petitioned it to form a Chemical Engineers Group (CEG), which was done, with him as chairman and 510 members. In 1920 this group voted to form a separate Institution of Chemical Engineers, which was achieved in 1922 with Hinchley as the Secretary, a role he held until his death. The inaugural meeting was held on 2 May 1922, at the Hotel Cecil, London.

Despite opposition from the Institute of Chemistry and the Institution of Civil Engineers, it was formally incorporated with the Board of Trade on 21 December 1922 as a company not for profit and limited by guarantee. The first Corporate meeting was held 14 March 1923 and the first Annual General Meeting on 8 June 1923: Arthur Duckham was confirmed as president, Hinchley as Secretary and Quinan as vice-president. At this time it had about 200 members. Nathan was the second President in 1925.

The American Institute of Chemical Engineers, which had been founded in 1908, served as a useful model. While suggestions of amalgamation were made and there was friendly but limited contact, the two organisations developed independently.

In 1926 an official Seal of the Institution was produced by Edith Mary Hinchley, wife of John Hinchley.

The same year the Institution set the first examinations for Associate (i.e. professionally qualified) membership, bringing it into line with the Civil and Mechanical Institutions. In addition to four set examinations of three hours each, there was a 'Home Paper' requiring the candidate to gather information and data and design a chemical plant, accompanied by drawings and a written design proposal within a time limit of a month.

In 1938 the membership passed 1000.

In 1939 the first courses were recognised as granting exemption from the examinations for Associate Membership, being Manchester College of Technology and of the South Wales and Monmouthshire School of Mines. Others followed in subsequent years.

In 1942 Mrs Hilda Derrick (née Stroud) was the first female member, in the category Student, taking a correspondence course in chemical engineering during the war. She was active in promoting the Institution and profession to women.

In 1955 Canterbury University College, New Zealand, and University of Cape Town, South Africa, were the first overseas institutions to have their qualifications recognised.

On 8 April 1957 IChemE was granted a Royal Charter, changing it from a limited company to a body incorporated by Royal Charter, a professional institution like the Civil and Mechanical ones, with HRH Prince Philip, Duke of Edinburgh as patron, a role he continued for over 63 years.

In 1971, the membership grades were changed: Associate became Member and Member became Fellow.

In 1976 the Institution moved its Headquarters from London to Rugby.

== Relations with other bodies ==
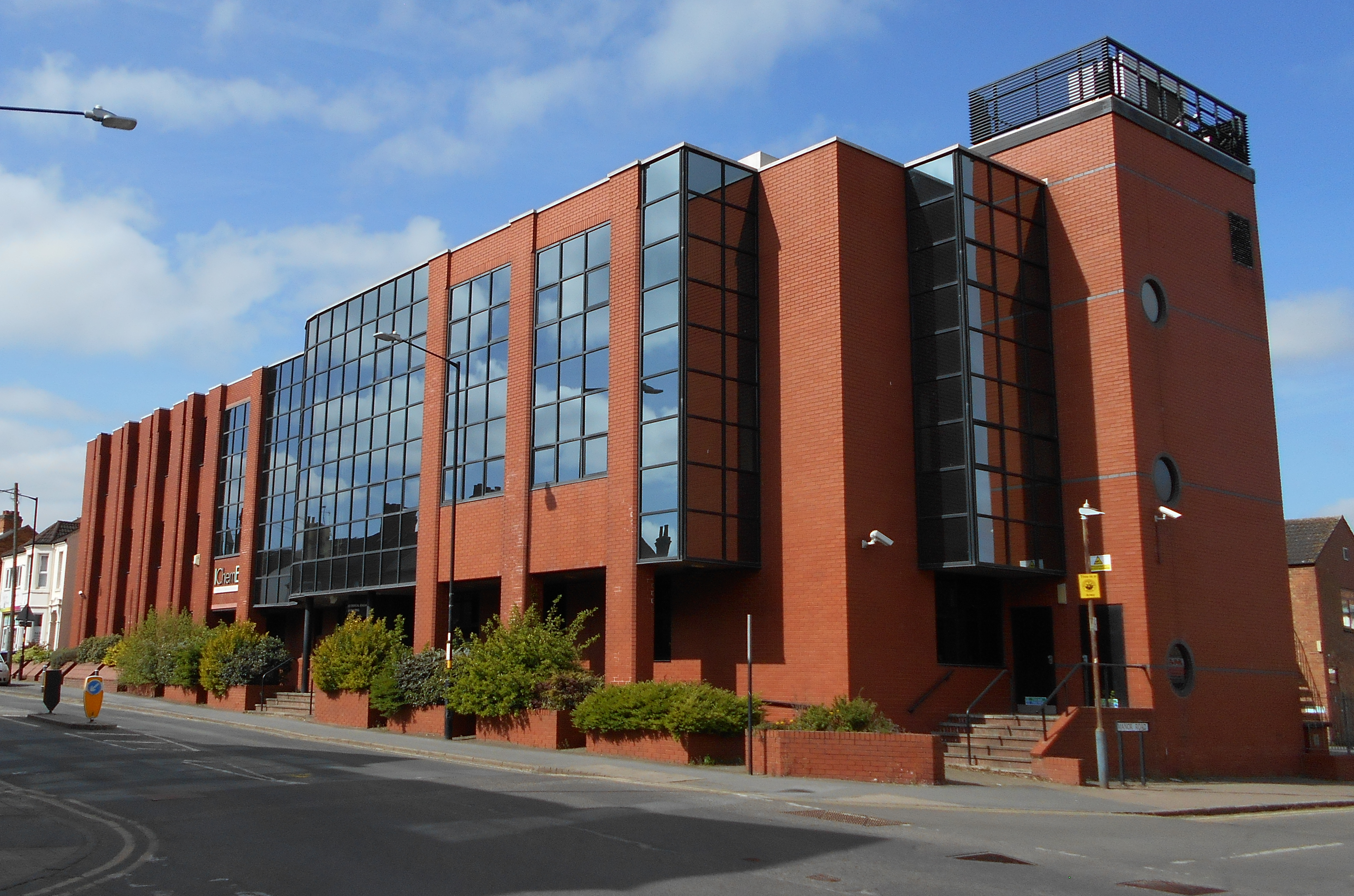
IChemE's head office in Rugby.

IChemE is licensed by the Engineering Council UK to assess candidates for inclusion on ECUK's Register of professional Engineers, giving the status of Chartered Engineer, Incorporated Engineer and Engineering Technician. It is licensed by the Science Council to grant the status of Chartered Scientist and Registered Science Technician. It is licensed by the Society for the Environment to grant the status of Chartered Environmentalist. It is a member of the European Federation of Chemical Engineering. It accredits chemical engineering degree courses in 25 countries worldwide.

In 2023, IChemE entered into a 'hydrogen alliance' with the American Institute of Chemical Engineers (AIChE). The collaboration aims to support industry's adoption of hydrogen as an energy carrier in the drive to net zero.

== Function ==
IChemE's vision is to "engineer a sustainable world" and its mission is to "put chemical and process engineering at the heart of a sustainable future, to benefit members, society, and the environment." These aims will be achieved by working towards two strategic goals: "Supporting a vibrant and thriving profession" and "serving society by collaborating with others", which are underpinned by five strategic enablers.

== Membership grades and post-nominals ==
IChemE has two main types of membership, qualified and non-qualified, with the technician member grade being available in both categories.

Qualified membership grades.

Fellow – Institution of Chemical Engineers highest grade of membership, awarded to individuals who have made significant and sustained contributions to chemical and process engineering, through leadership, professional impact and expertise. Entitles the holder to use the post-nominals FIChemE. Fellow status is not tied to Chartered Engineer status, so IChemE can recognise contributions from a wider range of professional backgrounds.

Chartered Member – Chartered Membership recognises professional competence and commitment as a chemical or process safety engineer through a peer-reviewed process. Chartered Members may use the post-nominal MIChemE and the title Chartered Chemical Engineer or Professional Process Safety Engineer. Eligible applicants can also apply through IChemE for external professional registrations including CEng, CSci, CEnv.

Associate Member – Associate Membership is designed for individuals with degree-level knowledge and understanding of chemical engineering who are developing their professional experience and working towards professional registration with IChemE. It is currently a requirement to have an IChemE accredited qualification or otherwise recognised chemical engineering degree, and Associate Members may use the post-nominal AMIChemE.

Technician Member – Technician Membership recognises individuals with technical and practical skills working in process engineering support, technical and operative roles across industry and academia. Technician Members may use the post-nominal TIChemE and typically hold EngTech registration.

Non-qualified membership grades.

Affiliate – Affiliate Membership is open to individuals with an interest in chemical and process engineering, including those working in or alongside the sector and graduates whose degrees are not accredited in chemical engineering. Affiliate Members can access IChemE resources, publications, learning opportunities and professional development support and members can progress to chartered member grade by via the UKU Underpinning knowledge & Understanding

Student – Student Membership is free for individuals studying a chemical, biochemical or process engineering degree, or a closely related subject. It supports students throughout their studies through access to technical resources, career support, networking and professional development opportunities.

Work-based Learner - Work-based Learner Membership is free for individuals in employment who are undertaking an apprenticeship, technical or vocational qualification, or other formal training programme. It supports early-career technical professionals through development resources, mentoring and networking opportunities, while helping them progress towards professional registration.

== Activities ==
=== Medals ===
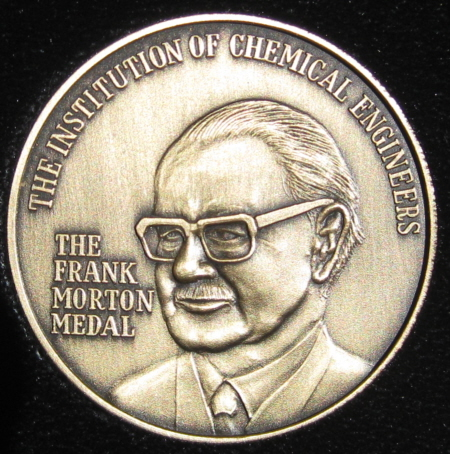
The Frank Morton Medal of the Institution of Chemical Engineers. Awarded biennially for outstanding service to chemical engineering education.

The Institution has been awarding Medals for different areas of chemical engineering work since the first Moulton medals were issued in 1929. The medal was named after Lord Moulton who helped develop chemical engineering during World War I when he took charge of explosive supplies. Today the institution gives out eleven medals related to research and teaching, six medals in special interest groups, four medals relating to publications, two medals for services to the profession and two medals for contribution to the Institution.

=== Annual awards ===
The IChemE Global Awards take place in November in the UK. The awards are highly regarded throughout the process industries for recognising and rewarding chemical engineering excellence and innovation. The first awards took place at the National Motorcycle Museum in Birmingham on 23 March 1994.

There are 16 categories in total that applicants are invited to enter, including Business Start-Up, Industry Project, Process Safety, and Sustainability, offering a broad scope for entries.

The organisation also holds awards ceremonies in other locations across the globe. 2024 will see the return of the IChemE Malaysia Awards alongside the first-ever IChemE Australasia Awards.

=== Ashok Kumar Fellowship ===
The Ashok Kumar Fellowship is an opportunity for a graduate to spend three months working at the UK Parliamentary Office for Science and Technology (POST). The fellowship was jointly funded by IChemE and the Northeast of England Process Industry Cluster (NEPIC). However, NEPIC was unable to contribute in 2018 and the Fellowship was not offered in 2019. As of 2021 it is jointly funded by IChemE and the Materials Processing Institute (reflecting Kumar's employment with British Steel).

The Fellowship was set up in memory of Dr Ashok Kumar, the only serving chemical engineer in the Parliament of the United Kingdom at the time of his sudden death in 2010. Kumar was an IChemE Fellow who had been the Labour MP for Middlesbrough South and Cleveland East.

=== DiscoverChemEng ===
In 2023, the Institution launched DiscoverChemEng, an initiative aimed at increasing awareness and understanding of chemical and process engineering among young people and the public. The programme delivers educational resources, engagement events, school challenge days and virtual work experience programmes. It works with educators, industry partners and IChemE members to support informed career choices, demonstrate that chemical engineering is everywhere, and showcase the role of chemical and process engineers in engineering a sustainable world.

=== ChemEng Evolution ===
In order to celebrate its centenary, in 2022 the Institution produced a website with short articles about historic matters in the history of chemical engineering and IChemE, hosting videos and webinars throughout the year. ChemEng Evolution

== Coat of arms ==
The coat of arms is a shield with two figures. On the left a helmeted woman, Pallas Athene, the goddess of wisdom, and on the right, a bearded man with a large hammer, Hephaestus the god of technology and of fire. The shield itself shows a salamander as the symbol of chemistry, and a corn grinding mill as a symbol of continuous processes. Between these is a diagonal stripe in red and blue in steps to indicate the cascade nature of many chemical engineering processes. The shield is surmounted by helmet on which is a dolphin, which is in heraldry associated with intellectual activity, and also represents the importance of fluid mechanics. Just below the dolphin are two Integral signs to illustrate the necessity of mathematics and in particular calculus.

The Latin motto is "Findendo Fingere Disco" or "I learn to make by separating".

== Publications ==
=== Peer-reviewed journals ===
- Chemical Engineering Research and Design
- Process Safety and Environmental Protection
- Food and Bioproducts Processing
- Education for Chemical Engineers
- Molecular Systems Design and Engineering (joint with the Royal Society of Chemistry)
- Sustainable Production and Consumption
- South African Journal of Chemical Engineering

=== Other periodicals ===
- The Chemical Engineer
- Loss Prevention Bulletin

=== Books ===
- Conference Proceedings
- Technical Guides
- Safety Books
- Forms of Contract

== Past presidents ==
- 2025 Raffaella Ocone
- 2024 Mark Apsey
- 2023 Nigel Hirst
- 2022 David Bogle
- 2021 Jane Cutler
- 2019 Stephen Richardson
- 2018 Ken Rivers
- 2017 John McGagh
- 2016 Jonathan Seville
- 2015 Andrew Jamieson
- 2014 Geoffrey Maitland
- 2013 Judith Hackitt
- 2012 Russell Scott
- 2011 Sir William Wakeham
- 2010 Desmond King
- 2009 Ian Shott
- 2008 Richard Darton
- 2007 Ramesh Mashelkar
- 2006 Greg Lewin
- 2005 John Stuart Archer
- 2004 Robin Batterham
- 2003 Stephen Vranch
- 2002 Dame Julia Higgins
- 2001 Graham Lawson
- 2000 John Perkins
- 1999 John H. Robinson
- 1998 Gordon Campbell
- 1997 John Bridgwater
- 1995 Keith Taylor
- 1995 John G. Collier (died in office)
- 1994 John Garside
- 1993 Antony Charles Barrell
- 1992 Edward John Bavister
- 1991 David Harrison
- 1990 Robin Paul
- 1989 Geoffrey Hewitt
- 1988 John Cullen
- 1987 Keith Walley
- 1986 Rolf Prince
- 1985 Archibald Forster
- 1984 Gordon Beveridge
- 1983 Brian Street
- 1982 Tony Lee
- 1981 Peter Rowe
- 1980 William Wilkinson
- 1979 Norman Franklin
- 1978 John Sorbett
- 1977 James Morris
- 1976 Hugh Anderson
- 1975 Jack Richardson
- 1974 Roger Kingsley
- 1973 Roger W. H. Sargent
- 1972 Herbert Ashton
- 1971 Jack Barrett
- 1970 John Frank Davidson
- 1969 Han Hoog
- 1968 George Dummett
- 1967 Chales Windebank
- 1966 Frederick Warner
- 1965 Peter Victor Danckwerts
- 1964 Earnest Sellers
- 1963 Frank Morton
- 1961 Colin Spearing
- 1959 Kenneth Hutchison
- 1957 Sir Hugh Beaver
- 1955 John Oriel
- 1953 Stanley Robson
- 1951 Sir Harold Hartley
- 1949 Dudley Newitt
- 1947 Herbert William Cremer
- 1945 Hugh Griffiths
- 1943 Frank Greene
- 1941 Charles S. Garland
- 1939 Francis Rogers
- 1937 William Cullen
- 1935 Herbert Levinstein
- 1934 William MacNab
- 1932 William Hulme Lever
- 1931 William Calder
- 1929 James Reavell
- 1927 Alexander Gibb
- 1925 Sir Frederick Nathan
- 1923 Arthur Duckham

== Notable members ==
- Roland Clift Developer of Life cycle assessment and broadcaster on environmental issues
- John Coulson (1910–1990) Co-writer of classic UK textbooks
- M. B. Donald (1897 - 1978) Fourth Ramsay professor of Chemical engineering at University College London. Former honorary secretary and vice-president of IChemE, Institution's Donald medal named after him.
- Sir Arthur Duckham (1879–1932) First President of the IChemE
- Ian Fells Noted energy expert and popular science broadcaster
- Trevor Kletz (1922–2013) Noted safety expert
- Ashok Kumar (1956–2010) UK Member of Parliament
- Frank Lees (1931–1999) author of major safety encyclopaedia
- Bodo Linnhoff His 1979 PhD thesis led to Pinch Technology which has enabled companies to save large amounts of energy
- Montague A. Phillips (1902–1972) Chemist who first synthesised the antibiotic sulphapyradine
- K. B. Quinan (1878–1958) An American who, according to Lloyd George "did more than any other single individual to win the (First World) War"
- Jack Richardson (1929–2011) Co-writer of classic UK textbooks
- P. N. Rowe (1919–2014) Fifth Ramsay professor of chemical engineering at University College London. He was president of the Institution between 1981 and 1982.
- Meredith Thring (1915–2006) prolific inventor, futurologist and early proponent of sustainability

== See also ==
- Chartered engineer
- Incorporated engineer
- Royal Society of Chemistry
- American Institute of Chemical Engineers (AIChE)
- Chemical engineer
- Chemical engineering
- History of chemical engineering
- List of chemical engineers
- List of chemical engineering societies
- Process engineering
- Process design (chemical engineering)
- Frank Morton Sports Day
- Northeast of England Process Industry Cluster
