= Arthur Douglas Peppercorn =

British artist (1847–1926)

Arthur Douglas Peppercorn (28 February 1847 – 1926) was a London-born landscape painter who has been likened to Corot. He was one of a group who had annual exhibitions at the gallery of the Royal Watercolour Society, including also the landscape painter James Aumonier, James Stevens Hill and John Leslie Thomson. He died in 1926 in Ashtead, Surrey.

His daughter was the international concert pianist Gertrude Peppercorn (1879–1966), a pupil of Tobias Matthay who made her concert debut at St James's Hall, London in 1897. In 1907 she married the writer Stacy Aumonier (1877–1928), the nephew of James Aumonier. Another daughter was Maud Peppercorn, a suffragette. She married the chemical engineer Sir Arthur Duckham (1879–1932).
