= Duckham =

Duckham is a surname. Notable people with the surname include:

- Alexander Duckham (1877–1945), English chemist and businessman
- Sir Arthur Duckham (1879–1932), English chemical engineer
- David Duckham (born 1946), English rugby union player
- Thomas Duckham (1816–1902), English farmer, cattle breeder and Liberal politician
