= Quinan =

Quinan may refer to:

- Quinan, Nova Scotia, Canada
- Edward Quinan (1885 – 1960), British Army commander
- K. B. Quinan (1878 – 1948), American chemical engineer
- Lloyd Quinan (born 1957), Scottish broadcaster and politician
