= William Rintoul =

British chemist

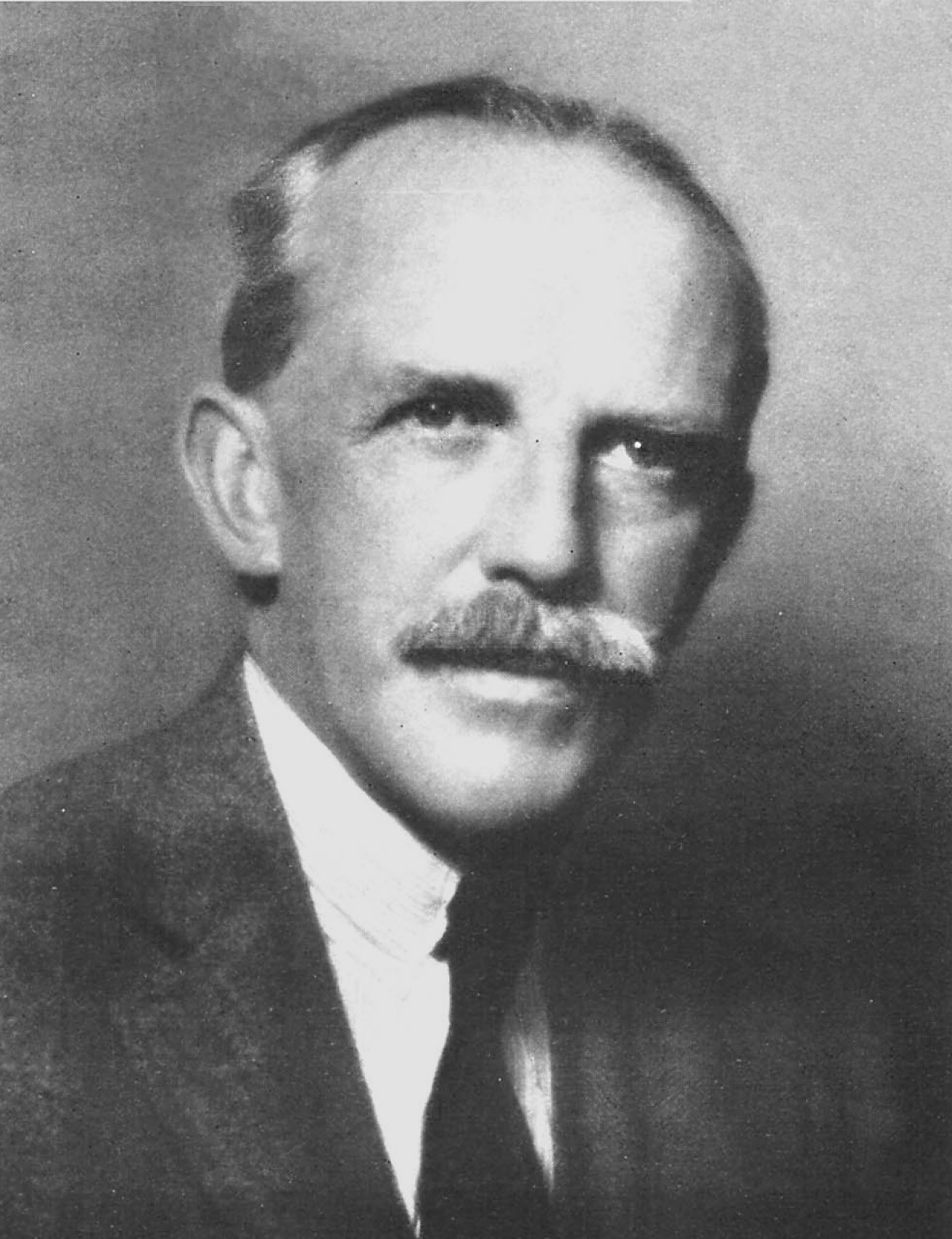
- Born: 1870; Glasgow, Scotland
- Died: 25 August 1936 (aged 65–66); Ardrossan, Scotland
- Scientific career
- Fields: Chemistry

William Rintoul OBE (1870 – 25 August 1936) was a British chemist and President of the Faraday Society between 1934 and 1936.

== Biography ==
Rintoul was born in Glasgow and attended Anderson's College there. He then lectured and worked as an assistant in analytical chemistry at the college. In 1891, he moved to London to assume a position of chemist at a paint factory and in 1894 moved to the Royal Gunpowder Factory. There, he later became the chemist-in-charge of the nitroglycerine production and eventually the chief chemist. Together with his friend Robert Robertson, Rintoul invented a process and designed a plant for the recovery of acetone during the production of cordite. In 1909, the superintendent of the Gunpowder Factory, Sir Frederic Nathan, moved to the Nobel Enterprises, an explosives plant in Ardeer, Scotland founded in 1870 by Alfred Nobel. Rintoul followed him and assumed the post of research manager. His organizational activities brought him in close contact with a wide range of scientists both in Britain and abroad. For his contribution to supporting the army in the World War I, Rintoul was decorated with the Order of the British Empire. He was a member of numerous committees including the Councils of the Chemical Society and Institute of Chemistry, the Safety in Mines Research Board, the Chemistry Research Board, the Research Committee of the Midland Railway and the British Standards Institution. From 1930, Rintoul was a member of the Council of the Faraday Society and in October 1934 was elected as its president. He died at home in Ardrossan, Scotland, after a prolonged illness. Rintoul married twice, first Lottie Edwards and two-year later Jess Isabel Robertson. He had two sons and a daughter from the first marriage.
