= Stacy Aumonier =

British short story writer (1877–1928)

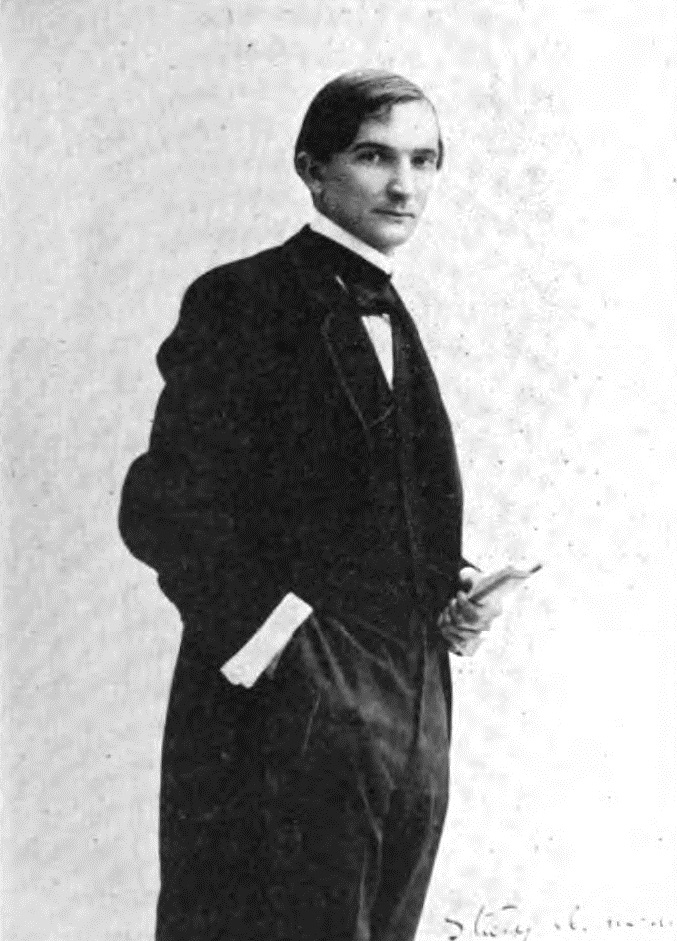
- Aumonier, circa 1917
- Born: 31 March 1877
- Died: 21 December 1928 (aged 51)
- Occupations: Short story writer, novelist, stage performer
- Spouse: Gertrude Peppercorn
- Children: 1
- Writing career
- Language: English

Stacy Aumonier (31 March 1877 – 21 December 1928) was a British author and stage performer, known best for his short stories. Between 1913 and 1928, he published more than 85 stories, 6 novels, a volume of character studies, and a volume of 15 essays.

The Nobel Prize winner (and Forsyte Saga author) John Galsworthy described Aumonier as "one of the best short-story writers of all time" and predicted that, through the best of his stories, he would "outlive all the writers of his day".

James Hilton (author of Goodbye, Mr Chips and Lost Horizon) said of Aumonier: "I think his very best works ought to be included in any anthology of the best short stories ever written." Asked to choose "My Favourite Short Story" for the March 1939 edition of Good Housekeeping, James Hilton chose a story by Aumonier, "The Octave of Jealousy", which the magazine described as a "bitterly brilliant tale".

== Life ==
Stacy Aumonier was born at Hampstead Road near Regent's Park, London on 31 March 1877. His birth decade is often cited incorrectly as 1887, as in his obituary in The New York Times, due to an error in the 1923 edition of Who's Who.

He came from a family with a strong and sustained tradition of visual arts, of Huguenot stock. His father, William Aumonier (1841–1914), was an architectural sculptor (founder of the Aumonier Studios off Tottenham Court Road, London), and his uncle was the painter James Aumonier R.I. (1832–1911). Stacy's brother, William (also an architectural sculptor) was responsible for recreating the interiors of Tutankhamun's tomb at the British Empire Exhibition in Wembley in 1924. The landmark sculpture The Archer at East Finchley Station in London was the work of his nephew, Eric Aumonier.

Stacy attended Cranleigh School in Surrey from age 13 (from 1890 to 1893). Although he would later write critically about English public schools (in newspaper articles for both the London Evening Standard and The New York Times) for the manner in which he considered they tried to impose conformity on their students, his record indicates that he integrated comfortably into Cranleigh. He was an ardent cricket player, belonged to the Literary and Debating Society, and became a prefect during his final year there.

When he left school, he seemed destined to follow family tradition, studying and working in the visual arts, in particular as a landscape painter. He exhibited paintings at the Royal Academy in 1902 and 1903, and in 1908, he exhibited a design for the entrance hall of a house. An exhibition of his work was held at the Goupil Gallery (London) in 1911.

In 1907, at West Horsley in Surrey, he married the international concert pianist, Gertrude Peppercorn (1879–1966), daughter of the landscape painter Arthur Douglas Peppercorn (sometimes termed "the English Corot"), and they had one son, Timothy, born in 1921.

=== Early career ===
A year after his marriage, Aumonier began a career in a second branch of the arts at which he enjoyed outstanding success—as a stage performer writing and performing his own sketches. In Written in Friendship, a Book of Reminiscences, Gerald Cumberland wrote that Aumonier's work on stage was the perfect preparation for his later writing career, describing it as "an almost ideal apprenticeship in literature. ... He gave character sketches of all kinds of people—vivid little portraits of curious men he had encountered in country lanes, in town, anywhere. ... To act well one must have observed men and women most closely; more, one must have understood them. Aumonier did act well. The theatre for him was but the entrance hall to literature." The Observer called him "a real and rare genius" who "could walk out alone before any audience, from the simplest to the most sophisticated, and make it laugh or cry at will."

=== Writing career ===
In 1915, Aumonier published a short story "The Friends" which was well received (and was subsequently voted one of the 15 best stories of the year by the readers of a Boston Magazine, Transcript). In 1917, he was drafted for service in World War I at age 40, serving first as a private in the Army Pay Corps, and then working as a draughtsman in the Ministry of National Service. The Army medical board in 1916 had recorded his occupation as "actor and writer." By the end of the next year, he had four books published—two novels and two books of short stories—and his occupation is recorded as "author."

During the mid 1920s, Aumonier was diagnosed with tuberculosis. During the last few years of his life, he would spend long terms in various sanatoria, some better than others. In a letter to his friend, Rebecca West, written soon before his death, he described the extraordinarily uncomfortable conditions in a sanatorium in Norfolk during the winter of 1927, where the dampness was so severe that a newspaper left beside the bed would feel "sodden to the touch in the morning".

Shortly before his death, he sought treatment in Switzerland, but died of the disease in Clinique La Prairie at Clarens beside Lake Geneva on 21 December 1928.

=== Contemporary accounts ===
Contemporary accounts – and his own letters, even at the worst times of his illness – suggest that Aumonier was an immensely likeable, witty man. The chief fiction critic of The Observer, Gerald Gould wrote: "His gifts were almost fantastically various; they embraced all the arts; but it was the charm and generosity of his personality which made him—what he unquestionably was—one of the most popular men of his generation." It continued: "The things he wrote will be remembered when the company of his friends (no man had more friends, or more devoted and admiring) are with him in the grave; but just now, to those who knew him, the thing most vividly present is the charm and wisdom of the man they knew."

Gerald Cumberland (in his work Written In Friendship) gave an interesting account of the appearance Aumonier presented: "A distinguished man, this—distinguished both in mind and appearance. Self-conscious. Perhaps. Why not? His hair is worn a trifle long, and it is arranged so that his fine forehead, broad and high, may be fully revealed. Round his neck is a very high collar and a modern stock. When in repose, his face has a look of shy eagerness; his quick eyes glance here and there gathering a thousand impressions to be stored up in his brain. It is the face of a man extremely sensitive to external stimulus; one feels that his brain works not only rapidly, but with great accuracy. And at heart, he takes himself and his work seriously, though he likes on occasion to pretend that he is only a philanderer."

== Short stories ==
There is general consensus that Aumonier's distinctive talent was for composing short stories rather than novels, and fellow writers (notably John Galsworthy and James Hilton) stated that some of his short stories were among the best ever written. Rebecca West said of his writing in 1922 that his ability to blend reality with the imaginary was "the envy of all artists".

"A real master of the short story," John Galsworthy wrote in an introduction to a collection of Aumonier's writing soon after Aumonier's death. "The first essential in a short-story writer is the power of interesting sentence by sentence. Aumonier had this power in prime degree. You do not have to 'get into' his stories. He is especially notable for investing his figures with the breadth of life within a few sentences." Galsworthy asserted that Aumonier "is never heavy, never boring, never really trivial; interested himself, he keeps us interested. At the back of his tales, there is belief in life and a philosophy of life, and of how many short story writers can that be said? ...He follows no fashion and no school. He is always himself. And can’t he write? Ah! Far better than far more pretentious writers. Nothing escapes his eye, but he describes without affectation or redundancy, and you sense in him a feeling for beauty that is never obtruded. He gets values right, and that is to say nearly everything. The easeful fidelity of his style has militated against his reputation in these somewhat posturing times. But his shade may rest in peace, for in this volume, at least he will outlive nearly all the writers of his day."

There is no typical Aumonier story or typical Aumonier character. Some of his stories (among his best) are comedies; some are of missed opportunity or loss. Some are war stories. He wrote with equal empathy about the very poor, the very rich, men, women, the ambitious, hobos, pompous husbands, shallow wives, war heroes, deserters, idealists, thieves. All his stories have in common is a great ease of style and "a sense of line that most of us should envy", as Galsworthy stated.

"He was profoundly in love with life," wrote Galsworthy. "All types were fish to his net".

It was not unusual for "all types" to appear in a single story of Aumonier's, including, most notably, in "The Octave of Jealousy", which James Hilton picked as his "favourite short story" when asked by the magazine Good Housekeeping in 1939.

=== "The Octave of Jealousy" ===
"The Octave of Jealousy" (first published in The Strand, November 1922) is a story of the different social classes of society in England at the time, and of the tiny (but hard-to-surmount) barriers separating each class from the one just above it, and of the petty jealousies felt at every level. From bottom to top, no one is content. It is in eight parts.

Part I: At the bottom of the ladder is a tramp. Feeling hungry, he eyes "the potential possibilities of a cottage standing back from the road." He exchanges a word with a farm labourer, but the labourer proceeds into the cottage, while the tramp is left to continue along the road. "Lucky devil," the tramp mutters.

Part II: Inside the cottage, the labourer is unhappy to find that his dinner is not ready and, while he waits for it, he goes to the cottage of the gamekeeper, Ambrose Baines. "Of course they had their dinner," the labourer notes enviously. "It would be like that. Mrs Baines was a marvel."

Part III: Ambrose, too, appreciates his wife's capability, and wishes better for her. "She was the daughter of a piano-tuner at Bladestone, and the glamour of this early connection always hung between Ambrose and herself." For the sake of his wife, Ambrose envies the slightly greater prosperity enjoyed by the shopkeepers, the Meads, and when he goes to their shop to buy candles: "A slightly disturbing sight met the eyes of Ambrose. The parlour door was open, and he could see a maid in a cap and apron clearing away tea things in the gaily-furnished room. The Meads had got a servant."

Part IV: Mr Mead is disturbed to learn that the publican Mr Mounthead has been able to buy a farm for his son. He thinks how much harder and less lucrative it is to manage a shop than a pub: "the pettiness of it all! Little bits of cheese, penny tins of mustard, string, weighing out sugar and biscuits, cutting bacon, measuring off ribbons and calico, and flannelette. People...running up little accounts it was always hard to collect." Whereas in Mr Mounthead's pub: "oh, the snappy quick profit. Everybody paying on the nail."

Part V: Mr Mounthead feels comfortable about money, but not about his social status, which is not as high as that of his neighbour, the "gentleman farmer," Lewis Wonnicott. Mr Mounthead thinks the fault for this lies with his wife, Queenie. "He had probably as much money as Lewis Wonnicott, if not more. He certainly had a more fluid and accumulative way of making it, but there the matter stopped. Wonnicott was a gentleman; his wife was a lady. He, James, might have been as much a gentleman as Wonnicott if circumstances had been different. Queenie could never be a lady in the sense that Mrs Wonnicott was a lady."

Part VI: Mrs Wonnicott, in turn, is worried about her own position in the neighbourhood, complaining to her husband that they don’t have the same social status as their neighbours, the Burnabys. "We know no one, no one at all in the neighbourhood...who is there of any importance that we know?"

Part VII: Mrs Burnaby, in turn, complains to her husband that their son won’t be able to advance his diplomatic career because they lack the power and influence of their neighbour, Sir Septimus Letter—an M.P., "owner of half the newspapers in the country" and a millionaire.

Part VIII: Sir Septimus finds his day full of decisions, engagements and ever-changing company ("the house party was a perpetual condition") but he is unsure if his wife is in the house or not. An assistant thinks she may be away as he hasn’t seen her for some days. Sir Septimus is conscious of people who want "to get him down." "Does one get to the top without making enemies?" he wonders. "Does one get to the top without suffering and bitterness and remorse?" Stepping out of his house briefly, he sees a tramp "exchange a word with a field labourer" before continuing down the road. Watching him, Sir Septimus feels a sense of longing. "'To be free!’" he thinks. "'To walk across those hills without a care, without a responsibility.' The figure, with its easy gait, fascinated him. ... With a groan, Sir Septimus buried his face in his hands, and murmured: 'Lucky Devil! ...’"

=== "Miss Bracegirdle Does Her Duty" ===
In "Miss Bracegirdle Does Her Duty," the conservative sister of an English clergyman travels on her own to a hotel in Bordeaux. When she closes the door of her room after returning from a bath, she sees a man asleep on the bed. She realises then she is in the wrong room, but the door handle has come off in her hand, and she can’t get out. Then she discovers the man is dead. "To be found in a strange man’s bedroom in the night is bad enough, but to be found in a dead man’s bedroom was even worse."

=== "Where Was Wych Street" ===
"Where Was Wych Street" is a type of story at which Aumonier excelled: a trivial incident develops gradually (involving every class of society as it grows) into a crisis that has national or global implications. Beginning at a public tavern in Wapping, where "the company was certainly not a handsome one," it proceeds through the courts and then to the home of a government minister, who is hosting a dinner party attended by, among others, his ambitious future son-in-law, who has the following thoughts about his wife-to-be: "But the most sparkling jewel in the crown of his successes was Lady Adela Charters, the daughter of Lord Vermeer, the Minister for Foreign Affairs. She was his fiancée and it was considered the most brilliant match of the season. She was young and almost pretty, and Lord Vermeer was immensely wealthy and one of the most influential men in Great Britain." Later, altered by events, the young man becomes more thoughtful: "Was life a rag—a game played by lawyers, politicians and people?" he wonders.

=== "Juxtapositions" ===
The story "Juxtapositions" has a musical motif. It has a plot twist that involves one of the characters, Colin St Clair Chasseloup: "the kind of man who always looked as though he had just had a cold bath, done Swedish drill, and then passed through the hairdresser’s on his way to your presence." Chasseloup (who is passionate about Bach) and the narrator (who verges on being intimidated by Chasseloup) are independently brought by their wives to a concert in which neither of them has any interest—a performance of the music of a "modern British composer." Both men make their escape from the concert, and decide to go for a drink, remembering too late that it is Sunday night and the pubs are closed. They are dressed for the concert. "I must now pay a tribute to that most sound of all social conventions—namely that of evening dress. It will carry one through almost any difficulty. Chasseloup and I were both in evening dress." A dramatic, funny plot twist—and a revelation of the complexity of Chasseloup's character—follows when Chasseloup becomes the victim of mistaken identity.

=== "Two of Those Women" ===
"Two of Those Women" is a study of a particular section of society at a particular time – Englishwomen living in small hotels in the South of France and Italy in order to enjoy a standard of living they would be unable to maintain in England. "All over the South of France and Italy particularly there are thousands of these women staying at pensions and small hotels, drifting from place to place, rudderless, unwanted, and patently unhappy. They have the atmosphere of exiles, as of people who have committed some crime in their own country, and dare not return. And in many cases the crime that they have committed is, I suspect, the unpardonable crime of poverty. Women who have held some kind of social position in their own country, and become impoverished, develop the not unreasonable idea that they can live more cheaply, and with more dignity, in a foreign hotel." The two women of the title are secondary casualties of World War I. The older woman's son has suffered mental damage, the younger woman's lover is unaccounted for. The older woman remembers her son as he used to be, as a child and as a soldier. The dialogue is interesting, all the more so for being witty: " 'Games! that was what he was so good at. Cricket, football, all those things. They said there were several colleges at both Oxford and Cambridge anxious to have him because he could run a hundred yard in – ten minutes, was it?' " and " 'He was captured by the Turks, you know. Did I tell you? Was it the Turks or the Arabs? some of those dark people, anyway, over there...' She made a vague gesture in the direction of the North Pole."

=== "The Funny Man’s Day" ===
"The Funny Man’s Day" is an unusually poignant story of Aumonier's, and some commentators on his work consider it his best. It is a wonderful character study of a loveable, always-performing music-hall comedian (very good at his job – his name tops the bill at the Railham Empire) on a day that a girl whom he might have married is marrying someone else. The story has great subtlety, and paints a detailed picture of a vanished way of life. The Introduction to Extremely Entertaining Short Stories by Stacy Aumonier (published in 2008) describes it (p.viii) as "about as perfect a short story as exists."

== Works ==
=== Short stories ===
More than 87 short stories appeared Aumonier's lifetime in more than 25 magazines, including Argosy Magazine, John O'London's Weekly, Strand Magazine and The Saturday Evening Post.

- The Friends and Other Stories (1917)
- The Landlord Of The Love A Duck (1919)
- The Genie Of The Dingle (1919)
- The Golden Windmill and Other Stories (1921)
  - The golden windmill
  - A source of irritation
  - The brothers
  - Old iron
  - Little white frock
  - A good action
  - Them others
  - The Bent Tree
  - The Great Unimpressionable
- Miss Bracegirdle and Other Stories (1923)
  - The Octave Of Jealousy
- Overheard, fifteen tales (1924)
- The Perfect Murder (1926)
- The Baby Grand and Other Stories (1926)
- Ups and Downs (1929)

=== Novels ===
- Olga Bardel (1916)
- Three Bars Interval (1917)
- Just Outside (1917)
- The Querrils (1919)
- One After Another (1920)
- Heartbeat (1922)

=== Other ===
- London discovers "Uncle Abe"
- A volume of character studies: Odd Fish (1923)
- A volume of essays: Essays of Today and Yesterday (1926)
