= The Chemical Engineer =

- Editor: Martin Read
- Categories: Chemical Engineering
- Frequency: Monthly
- Publisher: Institution of Chemical Engineers
- Founded: 1956
- Country: United Kingdom
- Website: www.thechemicalengineer.com
- ISSN: 0302-0797

The Chemical Engineer is a monthly chemical engineering technical and news magazine published by the Institution of Chemical Engineers (IChemE). It has technical articles of interest to practitioners and educators, and also addresses current events in world of chemical engineering including research, international business news and government policy as it affects the chemical engineering community. The magazine is sent to all members of the IChemE and is included in the cost of membership. Some parts of the magazine are available free online, including recent news and a series of biographies “Chemical Engineers who Changed the World”, although the core and the archive magazine is available only with a subscription. The online magazine also has freely available podcasts.

== History ==
The formal journal of the IChemE was the “Transactions” which was initially an annual publication. In order to keep members informed a “Quarterly Bulletin- Institution of Chemical Engineers” was issued. When the Transactions became quarterly, the Bulletin was issued as a supplement. In 1956 both changed to bi-monthly and the title was changed to “The Chemical Engineer” with the sub-title “Bulletin of the Institution of Chemical Engineers". It kept the same numbering, so was issue 125. According to the editorial it would contain news and “articles and comments by members, handled less formally than in Transactions, relating both to practical matters arising from experience and to broader aspects of professional life.”

From 2002 it was published as “TCE” but reverted to its original title with issue 894 in December 2015.
