= Frank Lees =

English chemical engineer & academic (1931-1999)

Francis Pearson Lees (5 April 1931 – 18 March 1999), usually known as Frank Lees, was a chemical engineer and a professor at Loughborough University who is noted for his contribution to the field of industrial safety.

== Education ==
Lees was born in Hexham, Northumberland. His parents sent him to the Quaker boarding school, Leighton Park School, Reading, which led to a lifelong association with the Society of Friends. He registered as a conscientious objector when called for National Service in 1948, and worked with the Friends Ambulance Unit/Post-War Service, part of the time in a British hospital.

He won an open scholarship at Trinity College, Oxford, graduating with a first class degree in Modern Languages (Russian and German) in 1954. After a period of employment, he decided to pursue a more scientific career and took A levels in Mathematics, Chemistry and Physics. These enabled him to start work in 1956 as an experimental officer in the Central Instrument Research Laboratory of ICI.

He studied chemical engineering part-time at West Ham College of Technology, then full-time at Imperial College, London, graduating with first class honours in 1959. The same year he married Elizabeth, whom he had known as a student at Oxford.

== Professional life ==
He then worked as a chemical engineer at ICI, being particularly involved in the early development of computer control of chemical plants, and later published the book "Man and Computer in Process Control by E. Edwards and F. P. Lees (1973), IChemE.

In 1967 he became a lecturer at what was then the Loughborough University of Technology. He received a PhD from the same institution in 1969 and rose to the position of Professor of Plant Engineering in 1974.

Following the Flixborough disaster of the same year, he was appointed to a new body, the (UK) national Advisory Committee on Major Hazards. He was later a technical assessor for the Inquiry into the Piper Alpha disaster, 1988.

== Publications ==
He published many papers, a notable one being “The Hazard Warning Structure of Major Hazards” which showed how risks could be assessed and reduced. However, he will be most remembered for his book Loss Prevention in the Process Industries of more than 1000 pages published in two volumes in 1980. This was a comprehensive review of the literature on accidents – how they happen and how they might be prevented. He took early retirement in 1990 to work on the second edition, which was published in 1996 in three volumes, indicating the growth in the field. Most books of this type would have been the result of efforts by a large team, but he was a single author. He had just finished the revision when he was affected by cancer, which led to his death.

According to Professor Gupta “His work has already saved numerous casualties and enormous economic losses since many thousands have been trained using his books and research papers and have applied them in practice. This process will continue at an accelerated rate for a very long time and, thanks to the universal nature of academic activities, it is already impacting globally.”

== Recognition ==
His achievements were recognised by medals and awards from the Institution of Chemical Engineers, the Royal Society of Chemistry, and the Institute of Metals. He was made a Fellow of the Royal Academy of Engineering in 1985 and was awarded the degree of Doctor of Science, DSc, honoris causa, by Loughborough University in 1998.

He did various voluntary works, and in later life was a local Magistrate.

In his honour, the Institution of Chemical Engineers instituted the Frank Lees Medal for the most meritorious publication on the topic of safety and loss prevention. In addition, Loughborough University set up the Frank Lees Centre for Loss Prevention.
