= Olga Bardel =

1916 novel by Stacy Aumonier

- US first edition 1916
- Author: Stacy Aumonier
- Language: English
- Genre: Bildungsroman
- Published: 1916
- Publisher: Methuen & Co (UK); The Century Co. (US)
- Publication place: United Kingdom
- Pages: 311 (UK)

Olga Bardel is a 1916 debut novel by the English author Stacy Aumonier, first published in the United Kingdom by Methuen & Co and in the United States by The Century Co. The novel is a study of the artistic temperament, and follows the life and development of the title character as she develops from a precocious musical child from the London slums, to an infant prodigy, to a troubled professional concert pianist.

== Plot ==
The novel opens with a prologue recounting a chance meeting after a space of many years between the narrator, a writer, and John Braille, a successful painter famed for his technically accomplished but showy portraits of rich patrons. Braille has recently exhibited a new portrait demonstrating a complete change of artistic direction. "The Mother" is a superbly sensitive and nuanced portrayal of a woman in a grey dress leaning on a grand piano and looking at her khaki-clad son as he stands before her ready to answer the call of war. The narrator, deeply moved by the painting, asks if he could set down the story of the woman depicted, whom he recognises as Olga Bardel.

Born into extreme poverty in Canning Town, a slum area of London, Olga's early years as an orphan were spent trying to escape punishment at the hands of her much older drunken and sometimes violent siblings, and in attempting to avoid the notice of her terrifying and controlling Uncle Grubhofer, a wire spring dealer who owns their lodgings. Her early interest in music develops when she secretly creeps into Uncle Grubhofer's room to play with the metal springs he keeps as part of his stock in trade.

Recognising the child's innate musical ability, a schoolteacher who also rents rooms from Grubhofer provides her with piano lessons. Quickly outstripping her teacher, Olga finds herself being forced by her uncle to make money for him by playing popular piano tunes at a local fairground, and then being marketed as "Olga Barjelski" – a child prodigy of the concert platform – by a syndicate in which he owns shares. Unable to endure the syndicate's complete control over her life, Olga runs away and throws herself on the mercy of Mrs Fittleworth, a wealthy American widow. She lives happily with her for some years.

At a house party, Olga is introduced to the artist John Braille, with whom she makes an instant connection. But then she meets and falls passionately in love with Harry Streatham, a composer, whom she ultimately marries. Harry, however, is not a good match: he stifles her creativity and disapproves of her performing career. Braille offers to paint her portrait, but the creative emotional strain is too much for him and he goes abroad, leaving no address.

Harry and Olga divorce, leaving Olga with two young sons to bring up alone. She cannot get Braille out of her mind, but is unable to find him. Eventually, realising that she will never be able to afford to educate the boys on her own she agrees to marry the middle-aged Sir Philip Ballater, a cultured museum director on whom she has already been forced to rely financially. As Lady Ballater, she spends several years hating the social round of events that she has to attend. She plays her piano only to friends, in private.

Braille returns to England, unaware of Olga's divorce and re-marriage. The pair arrange a brief evening assignation in the park, and agree to run away together – though by the next morning both have had second thoughts. Then, Sir Philip unexpectedly dies.

The novel concludes with an epilogue in which Braille fills in the remainder of Olga's story for the narrator. Olga's elder son Richard signs up with the War Office, although still under age at seventeen. Braille is there to observe mother and son's final parting as Richard in his khaki uniform goes off to war. He realises that he and his art will never be the same again. Olga and Braille embrace.

== Background ==
The heroine's occupation of concert pianist may reflect the fact that Aumonier was himself married to a well-known concert pianist, Gertrude Peppercorn.

== Critical reception ==
Olga Bardel was well received by The Weekly Freeman which called it a striking first novel and likely book of the year that brings Aumonier "at a bound into quite the first rank of novelists." The author was praised for his rare narrative power, broad sympathy and bold – sometimes over-bold – vividness of description.

The Bystander found it hard to believe that the book was a first novel, calling it wholly admirable: a very good story well told, with the sure and deft touch of an old hand.

The Bookman (New York) noted that the plot of what might easily have been a sensational story, "is rescued and dignified by a genuine and unforced characterisation, in the light of which the action is seen to proceed simply and inevitably."

Taking a rather lukewarm view, The Liverpool Daily Post considered the novel not sufficiently distinctive in subject or style to enthuse over, while conceding the story to be carefully told and interesting.

In a review article for The Sphere, S. P. B. Mais placed the novel within the contemporary tradition of Georgian fiction, drawing attention in particular to Olga's artistic creed that "One must always be able to look at life like a child – keep on recreating, keeping oneself susceptible to impressions, lest one gets atrophied, satisfied. There is nothing rotten except – being satisfied." Another reviewer in The Sphere argued on the basis of this novel and his other writings that Aumonier's real strength was not so much in the development of a good central plot, but rather his faculty for creating interesting characters and his gift of penetrating characterisation.
