= John Coulson (chemical engineer) =

Chemical engineer and academic (1910–1990)

John Metcalfe Coulson (13 December 1910 – 6 January 1990) was a British chemical engineering academic known for co-writing a 1954 textbook on chemical engineering with Jack Richardson; the book became an established series of texts now known as Coulson & Richardson's Chemical Engineering.

== Biography ==
John Coulson was born on 13 December 1909 in Dudley, Worcestershire, the twin brother of chemist and mathematician Charles Alfred Coulson. Their father was Alfred Coulson (who became Principal of Dudley Technical College) and their mother was Annie Sincere Hancock, a school headmistress. The brothers were raised Methodist. They lived in Dudley until 1919, when they moved to Bristol.

Coulson went to Clifton College. He did his first degree at Christ's College, Cambridge, then a postgraduate course in Chemical Engineering at Imperial College followed by research, achieving a PhD in 1935. He joined the academic staff, but soon in 1939 was required to leave his position and manage the Royal Ordnance Factories due to the outbreak of the Second World War. After the war he returned to his staff position and attained the status of Reader. He and fellow chemical engineer Frederick Warner co-designed an exercise on "The Manufacture of Nitrotoluene". Coulson co-wrote the Coulson & Richardson's Chemical Engineering textbook with Jack Richardson in 1954. That same year, Coulson became the first head of the Department of Chemical Engineering at Newcastle University, where he remained until his retirement in 1975, apart from a secondment to Heriot-Watt University during its formation of a separate department of chemical engineering.

Coulson married twice: first to Dora (died 1961), with whom he had two sons, Anthony and Simon, and then in 1965 to Christine, who survived him.

In 1973, he received two awards: the George E. Davis Medal of the Institution of Chemical Engineers, and an Honorary Doctorate from Heriot-Watt University. The John Coulson building at Heriot-Watt University is named for him.

Coulson died on 6 January 1990. He was 79.

== See also ==
- List of chemical engineers
