= Frank Morton (chemical engineer) =

Chemical engineering educator (1906–1999)

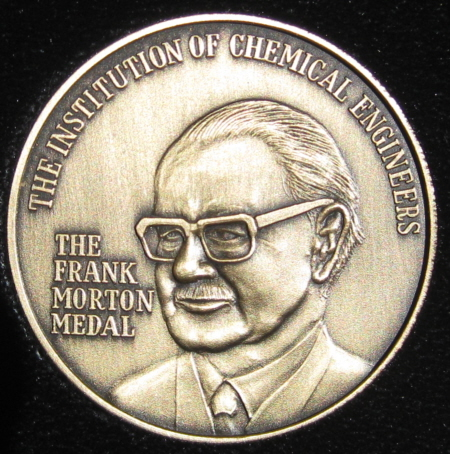
The Frank Morton Medal of the Institution of Chemical Engineers. Awarded biennially for excellence in chemical engineering education. Image of Frank Morton.

Frank Morton MScTech, PhD, AMCT, DSc, FRIC, (1906 – 21 January 1999) was a noted British professor of chemical engineering, instrumental in the creation of UMIST and commemorated by Frank Morton Sports Day and a medal named after him.

== Career ==
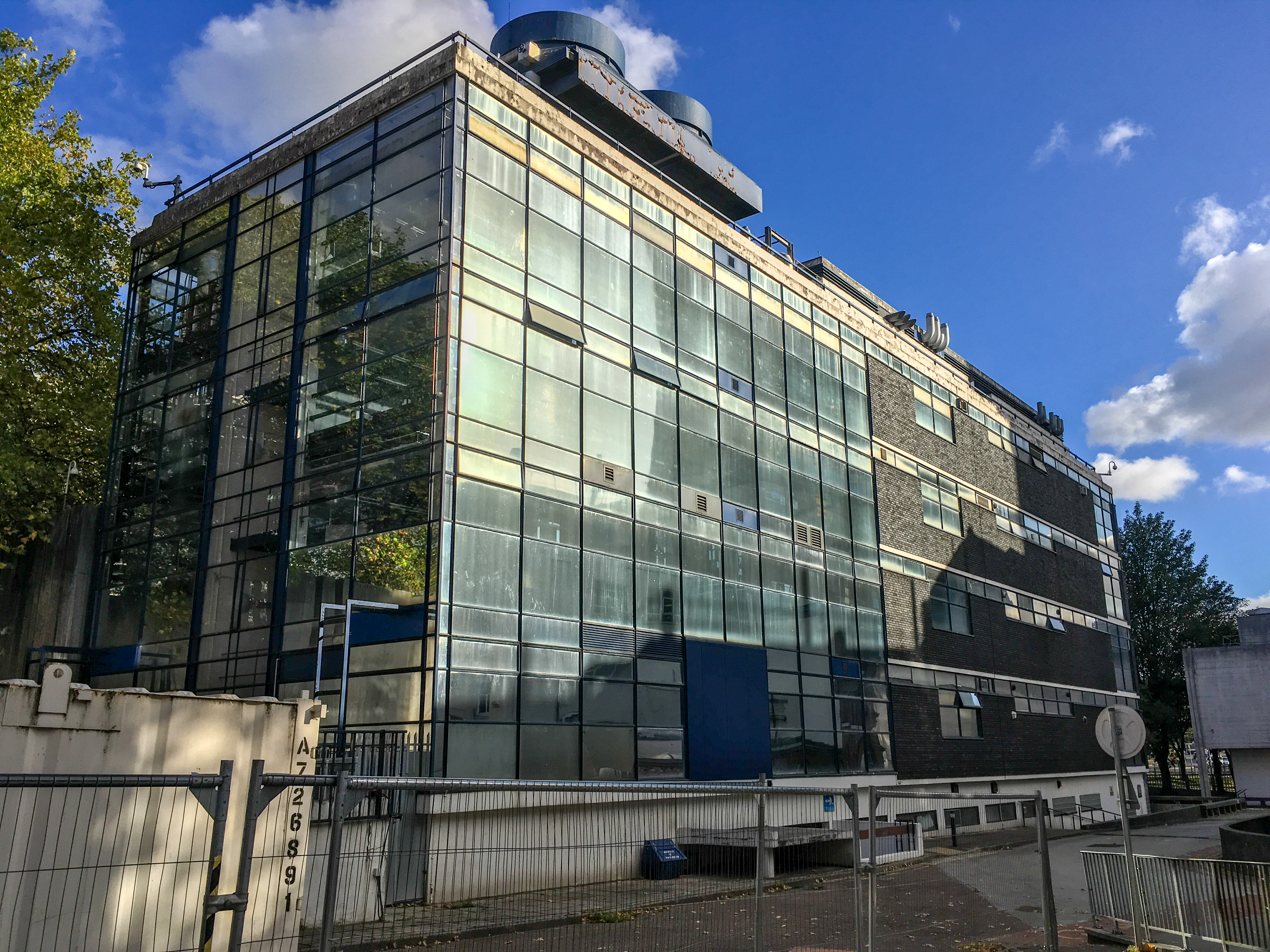
The Morton Laboratory at the University of Manchester

Morton was born in Sheffield. He left school at 14, but took evening classes and then a first class degree in Chemistry at Manchester Municipal College of Technology where he was also a very active sportsman, followed by a PhD in 1936. He then worked in Trinidad and was involved in expanding the oil refinery facilities during the Second World War.

In 1946, the Department of Chemical Engineering at the University of Birmingham was formed and he became one of the first lecturers, rising to a Professor in 1951. In 1956, he was appointed the first head of the newly formed Department of Chemical Engineering at Manchester College of Science and Technology (later UMIST, now the University of Manchester), UK. In 1966, a new building for the pilot plant of the department was named the Morton Laboratory.

His research publications were in the field of mass transfer in distillation and liquid-liquid contact columns.

In 1961, he instituted a sports competition between the departments of Chemical Engineering at Manchester and Birmingham. This has now expanded to include all chemical engineering departments in the UK and is an annual event, known as the Frank Morton Sports Day.

He was President of the Institution of Chemical Engineers in 1963–1964. His presidential address was entitled "Chemical Engineering Manpower - a critical survey".

In 1964, he took over as acting principal of the Manchester College, while the principal, B. V. Bowden, occupied a position in the Wilson government as Minister for Education and Science. It was at Morton's initiative that the college changed its name to UMIST.

When the UK began to consider using North Sea gas as a domestic fuel, Morton headed a government enquiry into its safety.

In view of his particular interest in and contributions to the education of chemical engineers, in 2001, the Institution of Chemical Engineers awarded the first Morton Medal "for excellence in chemical engineering education".

He died in Rhos-on-Sea in 1999.

== Bibliography ==
- F. Morton (1982) "A short history of chemical engineering in the North-West of England" in W. M. Furter (ed) (1982) A Century of Chemical Engineering ISBN 0-306-40895-3
