= John Hinchley =

British chemical engineer (1871–1931)

John William Hinchley Wh.Sch. ARSM FIC
- Born: 21 January 1871; Grantham, England
- Died: 13 August 1931 (aged 60); London, England
- Occupation: Engineer
- Spouse: Edith Mary Mason 1903
- Parent(s): Johan Hinchley, Eliza Holland
- Engineering career
- Discipline: Chemical
- Institutions: Faraday Society; Institution of Chemical Engineers; Institution of Chemical Technologists; Institute of Chemistry; Society of Chemical Industry
- Awards: Whitworth Scholarship

John William Hinchley (1871-1931) was a chemical engineer who was the first Secretary of the Institution of Chemical Engineers.

== Early life and education ==
Hinchley was born 21 January 1871 in Grantham, and studied at Lincoln Grammar School. From 1887 to 1890 he served an engineering apprenticeship at Ruston, Proctor and Company while attending science classes in the evening, being a prizewinner in chemistry, followed by a year as a science teacher. A national scholarship and the support of a friend enabled him to go to Imperial College, London where he graduated in 1895 with first class honours. He successfully sat the exam for a Whitworth Scholarship.

== Career ==
After Imperial College, he went to Dublin to assist Professor John Joly with the development of colour photography. Returning to London he became assistant to a designer of acid plants and acetone production which stopped when his employer was killed in a road accident, so he became a chemical engineering consultant. In 1903 he went to Siam to be the technical head of the new Royal Mint of Bangkok, successfully developing a process melting 2.5 tons of silver a day and coinage to British Royal Mint standards. Back in London he was again a consultant, designing and erecting a variety of chemical plants.

In 1909 he was invited to give a series of 25 lectures on chemical engineering at Battersea Technical College, the first regular curriculum in the subject in the UK. These were popular, and in 1911 he was appointed lecturer in chemical engineering for two days a week at Imperial College, in 1917 becoming assistant professor, all the while continuing with his professional work, but passing on the course at Battersea. The same year he was promoted to the class of Fellows of the Institute of Chemistry. In 1926 he was made full Professor. The same year the article on Chemical Engineering in Encyclopedia Britannica was his work.

== Institution of Chemical Engineers ==
George E. Davis proposed the formation of a Society of Chemical Engineers, but instead the Society of Chemical Industry (SCI) was formed. In 1918 Hinchley, who was a Council Member of the SCI, petitioned it to form a Chemical Engineers Group, which was done, with him as chairman and 510 members In 1920 this group voted to form a separate Institution of Chemical Engineers, which was achieved in 1922 with Hinchley as the Secretary, a role he held until his death. According to the editor of Chemical Age just after his death, "The establishment, a few years later, of the Institution of Chemical Engineers was due to him perhaps more than any single person." The journal Nature described him as instrumental in its formation.

== Personal life ==
It was while at Imperial College that he was introduced to a student at the Royal College of Art, Edith Mary Mason. She was later a member of the Royal Society of Miniature Painters, Sculptors and Gravers. They were married on 4 August 1903. She designed the Seal for the Institution of Chemical Engineers, which was executed by medallist Cecil Thomas, a fellow member of the same Royal Society.

While in Siam, he became a freemason and was involved in setting up the Imperial College Masonic lodge.

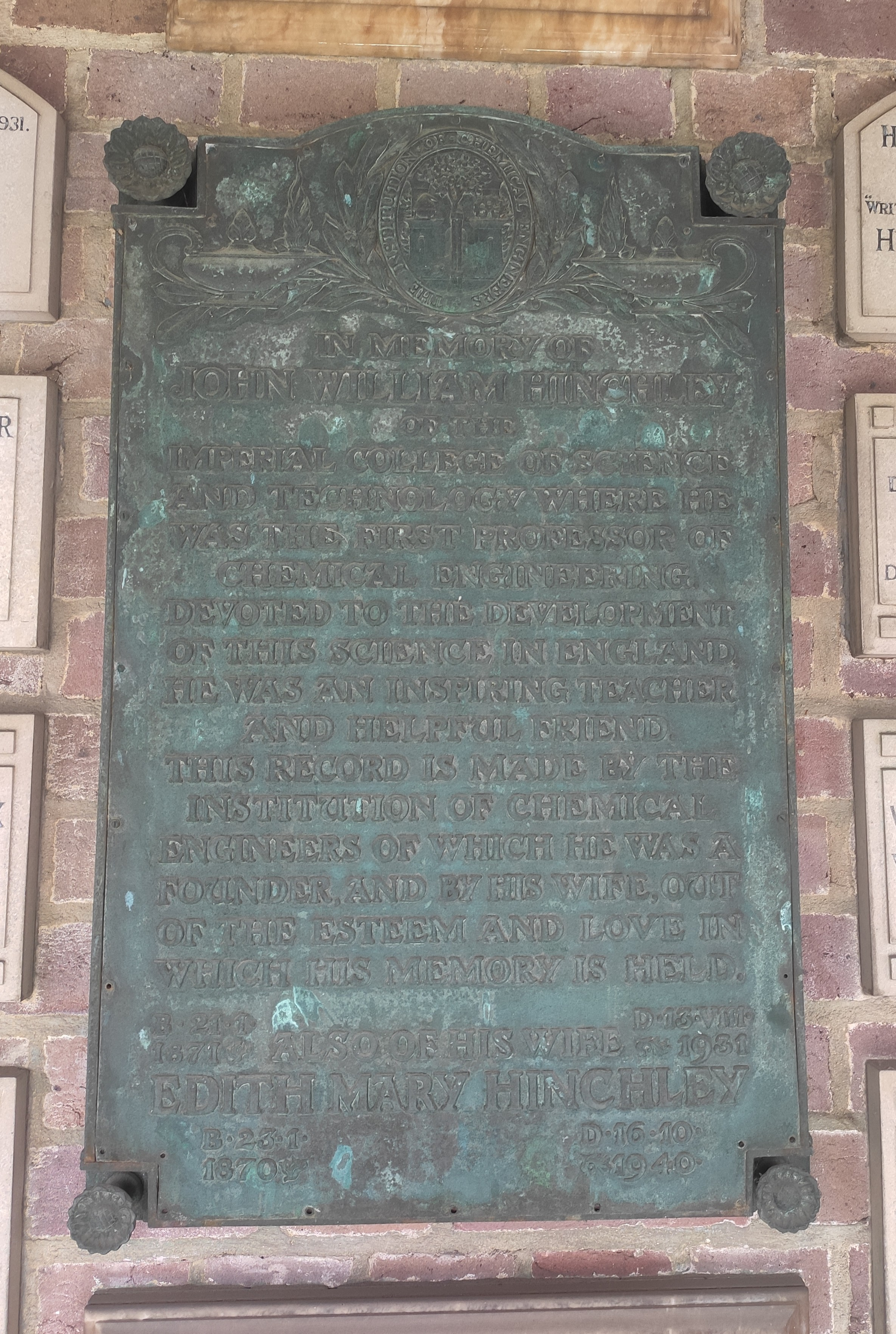
Plaque dedicated to John Hinchley at Golders Green Crematorium

He died 13 August 1931 after a long illness. He was cremated at Golders Green Crematorium and the ashes scattered in the Garden of Rest, where there is now a memorial.

== Legacy ==
The Institution of Chemical Engineers instituted an annual Hinchley Memorial Lecture in 1932 and a Hinchley Medal in 1943 for the most meritorious student of chemical engineering at Imperial College. The Medal continues, but is now directly awarded by the college.

== Bibliography ==
- Hinchley, Edith (1935). John William Hinchley: Chemical Engineer. South Kensington: Lamley & Co.
- Divall, Colin; Johnstone, Sean (2000). Scaling Up - The Institution of Chemical Engineers and the Rise of a New Profession. Dordrecht: Kluwer Academic.
