= Faraday Discussions =

- Discipline: Physical chemistry, chemical physics
- Language: English
- Edited by: Philippa Ross

Publication details
- Former name(s): Faraday Discussions of the Chemical Society
- History: 1947-present
- Publisher: Royal Society of Chemistry (United Kingdom)
- Frequency: 8/year
- Impact factor: 4.394 (2021)

Standard abbreviations
- ISO 4: Faraday Discuss.

Indexing
- CODEN: FDISE6
- ISSN: 1359-6640 (print); 1364-5498 (web)
- LCCN: 74642310
- OCLC no.: 40343517

Links
- Journal homepage

Faraday Discussions is a scientific journal publishing original research papers presented at a long-running series of conferences on physical chemistry, chemical physics and biophysical chemistry which are also called Faraday Discussions, together with a record of the comments made at the meeting. The journal was originally published by the Faraday Society. The journal has been published by the Royal Society of Chemistry (RSC) since that society merged into the RSC. From 1972 to 1991, it was known as the Faraday Discussions of the Chemical Society. Traditionally there have been three Faraday Discussions a year, however, from 2014 around eight conferences (and therefore eight volumes of the journal) are organised annually.

Philippa Ross is the editor of Faraday Discussions and the present chairman of the Standing Committee on Faraday Conferences is John Seddon (Imperial College London). The journal has a 2021 impact factor of 4.394.

== History ==
The majority of Faraday Discussions are held in the United Kingdom, although an increasing number are held overseas, with the first Discussion in China in 2014 and the first in India in 2015. Proofs of the 20-25 invited and contributed selected papers are circulated to participants well in advance of the meeting. Since each paper has been read in advance, the actual meeting is able to concentrate on discussion and debate. The whole of the proceedings is subsequently published including submitted discussion remarks which include those that "the contributors said, think they said, or wished they had said!".

There are well established links with a number of European societies, including the Division de Chimie Physique of the Société Française de Chimie, the Deutsche Bunsen Gesellschaft, and the Società Chimica Italiana. Joint European meetings are held and there are international relationships worldwide both at Divisional and Specialist Interest Group level.
