= J. Arthur Reavell =

British chemical engineer

James Arthur Reavell
- Born: 10 June 1872; Alnwick, Northumberland, England
- Died: 26 August 1973 (aged 101)
- Engineering career
- Discipline: Chemical engineering

James Arthur Reavell (10 June 1872—26 August 1973) M.I.Mech.E., M.I.Chem.E., F.Inst.F., F.I.M. was a British chemical engineer, who created a major company and was one of the founders and a president of the Institution of Chemical Engineers.

== Life ==
Reavell was born 10 June 1872 in Alnwick, the son of George and Martha Reavell. He attended Alnwick Grammar School and Silcoates School. He married Emma Mabel Clowes on 24 May 1898, and they had two sons, and one daughter. After her death, he married Winifred E. Haydon on 16 August 1941. One of his sons, Brian Noble Reavell, was also a chemical engineer, and took over as chairman when he retired from his business in 1960.

He died 26 August 1973.

== Career ==
He wanted to be a chemist, but instead served an apprenticeship in electrical engineering, and had several positions, rising to be manager for the European operations of an American chemical engineering company Worthington Pumps then manager of Manlove, Alliott & Co. Ltd., dealing with sugar refining, of which a particular aspect is evaporation. In 1907 he set up his own company Kestner Evaporator and Engineering Co., to deal with the British and Empire market of an improved design of evaporator patented by his friend, French inventor Paul Kestner. During the First World War his engineering expertise was applied to solving the shortage of explosives in a team headed by Lord Moulton. He continued as Chairman of Kestner until 1960, when he stepped down in favour of his son, Brian, but continued as president until 1963. The company made a variety of chemical plants with subsidiaries in Australia and South Africa.

== Institutions ==
As Chairman of the Chemical Engineering Group of the Society of Chemical Industry (SCI) he was one of the small group of enthusiasts who founded the Institution of Chemical Engineers, becoming its President 1929. He continued to be active in the SCI, being vice-president from 1931 to 1934.

He was also a Member of the Institution of Mechanical Engineers; a Fellow of Institute of Fuel; and a Fellow, Institute of Metals; Chairman of the British Chemical Plant Manufacturers' Association; Chairman of the chemical engineering industry section of the British Standards Institute; and President of the Combustion Appliance Manufacturer's Association from which he formed the British Coal Utilisation Research Association, and was its vice-president.
