= Jack Richardson (chemical engineer) =

British chemical engineer (1920–2011)

John Francis Richardson OBE (29 July 1920 – 4 January 2011) was a UK chemical engineering academic, notable for his research into multiphase flow and rheology, but best known for a series of textbooks.

== Life ==
Richardson was born 29 July 1920 in Palmers Green, London, and achieved a first class BSc (Eng) in chemical engineering at Imperial College, London, in 1941 and a PhD at the same institution in 1949. He joined the academic staff and rose to Senior Lecturer.

In 1946 he was one of the founder members of the Society for International Folk Dancing, along with Joan White, whom he married in 1955. They were married until his death. He continued in dancing despite the loss of a leg in 1979.

In 1960 he was appointed Head of the Department of Chemical Engineering at University College Swansea, where he remained till his retirement in 1987. In 1969 he was awarded the Arnold Greene Medal of the Institution of Chemical Engineers, and he was its President from 1975 to 1976. He was also a Fellow of the Royal Academy of Engineering. He was awarded the OBE in the 1981 New Year Honours List for services to industry via his work on various government and other committees.

Richardson died on 4 January 2011.

== Publications ==
A full list was published in Chemical Engineering Research and Design in 2006.

Richardson's first paper was on the fire hazards of liquid methane and further papers on fire hazards followed until 1952 when he began to move into multi-phase flow (particularly gas–liquid flows) and rheology which became his main focus: his research was honoured in two issues of Chemical Engineering Research and Design.

He co-wrote a textbook on chemical engineering with John Coulson (published in 1954), which developed into an established series of six texts now known as Coulson & Richardson's Chemical Engineering. (He and Coulson were largely responsible for the contents of the first two volumes: they were editors but not prime authors for the rest of the series of six volumes.) He continued editing the series after the death of Coulson in 1990.

- 1999 Coulson and Richardson’s Chemical Engineering, Volume 1, 6th edition, J.M. Coulson and J.F. Richardson, Butterworth-Heinemann.
- 2001 Coulson and Richardson’s Chemical Engineering. Solutions to the Problems in Volume 1, (with J.R. Backhurst and J.H. Harker), Butterworth-Heinemann.
- 2002 Coulson and Richardson’s Chemical Engineering, Volume 2, 5th, edition, J.M. Coulson and J.F. Richardson, Butterworth-Heinemann.
