= Frederic Nathan =

British chemical engineer

Sir Frederic Nathan KBE
- Born: 10 February 1861
- Died: 10 December 1933 (aged 72); London, England
- Occupation: Engineer
- Spouse(s): Adeline Edith Sichel, m. 1888
- Children: 4
- Engineering career
- Discipline: Chemical
- Institutions: Royal Institution; Institution of Chemical Engineers; Society of Chemical Industry
- Awards: Knight Commander of the Most Excellent Order of the British Empire; Order of Leopold II; Order of Saint Anna

Colonel Sir Frederic Lewis Nathan, KBE, (1861–1933) was a chemical engineer who played a major part in the supply of munitions in the UK during the First World War.

== Early life and education ==
Nathan was born 10 February 1861, the son of Johan Nathan. Being a Jew, he did not have access to leading British public schools, so was educated privately, before entering the Royal Military Academy, Woolwich.

== Career ==
Nathan joined the Royal Artillery in 1879, serving in Britain and India specialising in ordnance, helping to develop the magazine rifle and rising eventually to the rank of Brevet Colonel, his last post being Superintendent of the Royal Gunpowder Factory, Waltham Abbey. The factory produced more than just gunpowder, and Nathan was responsible for the first production batches of cordite and a patent for equipment for the manufacture of nitroglycerine. Leaving the army in 1909, he took up the position of general manager of Nobel's Explosives Co's works at Ardeer.

During the First World War, Nathan was responsible for building factories for the production of TNT and cordite. With the Shell Crisis of 1915 he was made the Director of Propellant Supplies in the Ministry of Munitions which meant taking charge of the soap and distillery industries for supplies of glycerine and alcohol. He was also Chair of the Standing Committee on the Causes of Explosions in Government and Controlled Factories.

After the war he joined the government Department of Scientific & Industrial Research, being in charge of fuels research and later in a subcommittee on explosives in mines.

== Institution of Chemical Engineers ==
He was one of the principal proponents of the formation of an Institution of Chemical Engineers and one of its founder members in 1922, becoming vice-president and then the second President 1925–7, an active member until his death and particularly concerned with education.

== Personal life ==
In 1888 he married Adeline Edith Sichel, and they had four sons, one of whom was killed in action.

He was active in the Boy Scouts Association, being commander of the Jewish Lads Brigade, and a member of the Jewish Historical Society He was on the management committee of the Royal Institution. He was Chairman of the Association of Special Libraries and Information Bureaux.

He died at home in Cornwall Gardens, London on 10 December 1933.

== Honours ==
He was knighted in 1906 and created KBE in 1918. The same year he received the Order of Leopold II from the King of the Belgians. He also received the Russian Order of Saint Anna.
