= Frank Morton Sports Day =

British sports event for chemical engineering students

The Frank Morton Sports Day (abbreviated to FM) is an annual sporting competition between the students of chemical engineering departments from UK and Irish universities. The event is held on one of the campuses of one of the competing universities, normally in the second week of February, when there is less academic pressure on students. In 2009, for the first time, the event was held in Singapore as well as the UK. In 2021 the event was held online for the first time, due to the COVID-19 pandemic.

== History ==
The event is named after Frank Morton, a prominent professor of Chemical Engineering, who taught at Birmingham University until 1956, when he switched to teaching at UMIST (now University of Manchester). His love for sport and connections at both universities led him to organise the first of these sports days. The competition began in 1961 as a football match between the two departments, but by the 1980s, the event had grown to include many more universities and sports. In 2015, 29 Universities competed in 19 events.

Previous Winners:

Year	Winner	Host	Reference
2026	University of Cambridge	University of Nottingham	
2025	University of Nottingham	University of Nottingham	
2024	University of Nottingham	Swansea University	
2023	University of Birmingham	University of Birmingham	
2022	University of Birmingham	University of Newcastle	
2021	University of Bath	University of Bradford (online)	
2020	University of Birmingham	University of Birmingham	
2019	University of Birmingham	University of Sheffield	
2018	University of Birmingham	University of Leeds	
2017	University of Birmingham	Loughborough University	
2016	University of Birmingham	University of Manchester	
2015	University of Birmingham	University of Birmingham	
2014	University of Strathclyde	University of Strathclyde	
2013	Imperial College London	University of Newcastle	
2012	University of Birmingham	University of Swansea	
2011	University of Birmingham	University of Nottingham	
2010	University of Birmingham	University of Birmingham	
2009	University of Manchester	University of Newcastle	
2008	Imperial College London	University of Leeds	
2007	Imperial College London	University of Manchester	
2006	University of Manchester	University of Birmingham	
2005	Imperial College London	University of Newcastle	
2004	Loughborough University	Loughborough University	
2003	University of Sheffield	University of Sheffield	
2002	Imperial College London	UMIST	
2001	Imperial College London	University of Leeds	
2000	Imperial College London	University of Bath	
1999	Loughborough University	University of Nottingham	
1998	Loughborough University	University of Sheffield	
1997	University of Newcastle	University of Newcastle	
1996	University of Birmingham	University of Birmingham	
1995	Loughborough University	Loughborough University	
1994	Loughborough University	University of Surrey	
1993	University of Birmingham	Bradford University	
1992	Loughborough University	Loughborough University	
1991	University of Birmingham	UMIST	
1990	University of Birmingham	University of Birmingham/Aston University	
1989	University of Birmingham	University of Nottingham	
1988	Loughborough University	Teesside Polytechnic	
1987	University of Birmingham	University of Newcastle	
1986	University of Nottingham	Southbank Polytechnic	
1985	Birmingham/Nottingham	Newcastle University	

Wins	University	Last Won
18	Birmingham	2023
7	Imperial	2013
7	Loughborough	2004
4	Nottingham	2025
2	Bath	2021
2	Manchester	2009
1	Cambridge	2026
1	Strathclyde	2014
1	Sheffield	2003
1	Newcastle	1997

== Virtual Frank Morton Bradford 2021 ==
On February 13, 2021, the University of Bradford hosted the event online for the first time, due to the COVID-19 pandemic. Despite many physical sports not being possible, the winner was decided based on various challenges and games, including most kick-ups, a trivia quiz, and a FIFA21 tournament. Despite the unconventional circumstances, the event was attended by 24 UK universities and was sponsored by 2 leading chemical engineering companies: Pfizer and GlaxoSmithKline. The main event was moderated via livestream, which reached over 100 real-time viewers at its peak. The winner of the 2021 Frank Morton Trophy was the University of Bath.

== Frank Morton Leeds 2018 ==
In 2018 Frank Morton was attended by around 2100 chemical engineers from 28 universities. 18 sporting events took place in various venues around Leeds. The careers fair and opening and closing ceremony were hosted in Leeds University Union. The evening entertainment saw carnival rides come to the union as well as the headline act- MistaJam.

== Frank Morton Birmingham 2015 ==
The 2015 event was attended by around 2700 chemical engineering students from 29 UK and Irish universities. The event took take place at the Barclaycard Arena, with students and companies to participating in 19 different sporting events located in venues around Birmingham.

== Frank Morton Newcastle 2013 ==
The event was hosted by Newcastle University on Tuesday 12 February and saw the scale of the event increase dramatically. The event took place in the Newcastle Arena, and was the first time the event has ever been held in a commercial venue. Over 2000 chemical engineering students from 24 UK and Irish universities participated in 15 different tournaments across the city.

With 22 organisations financially supporting the event, £60,000 was raised. The event was partnered with ABB with sponsorship from GSK, Royal Navy, Phillips 66, ExxonMobil and support from Bechtel, Johnson Matthey, Croda, KBR, Davy Process Technology, Gradcracker, Valero Energy and Ineos.

== Previous Events ==
In 2012, the event took place at Swansea University, 21 February 2012 and included a number of new events such as Laser Tag and Bowling. The 2012 event was won by Birmingham

In 2011, the event took place on 22 February at the University of Nottingham and was won by the University of Birmingham.

In 2010, the event was hosted, and won, by the University of Birmingham on 18 February. It involved 1547 students from 20 universities. The Asia-Pacific Frank Morton Sports Day in October 2010 was hosted by the Universiti Technologi Mara, Kuala Lumpur, Malaysia.

In 2009, Frank Morton Sports Day was held in Singapore as well as the UK for the first time. In the UK, Newcastle University hosted the event. Overall winners were the University of Manchester, with Strathclyde second and Birmingham Third. The National University of Singapore hosted the Singapore event on 21 February 2009. Overall winners were Universiti Teknologi MARA with University of Nottingham (Malaysia) second and National University of Singapore third.

In 2008 the event took place on 19 February at the University of Leeds. 1300 students from 17 universities and several company teams took part. Imperial College London successfully defended their title as overall winners, with Birmingham University second and Strathclyde University third. The champion company team was that from Bechtel.
