= Faraday Society =

Former British learned society

The Faraday Society was a British society for the study of physical chemistry, founded in 1903 and named in honour of Michael Faraday. In 1980, it merged with several similar organisations, including the Chemical Society, the Royal Institute of Chemistry, and the Society for Analytical Chemistry to form the Royal Society of Chemistry which is both a learned society and a professional body. At that time, the Faraday Division became one of six units within the Royal Society of Chemistry.

The Faraday Society published Faraday Transactions from 1905 to 1971, when the Royal Society of Chemistry took over the publication.

Of particular note were the conferences called Faraday Discussions, which were published under the same name. The publication includes the discussion of the paper as well as the paper itself. At the meeting, more time is given to the discussion than to the author presenting the paper as the audience are given the papers prior to the meeting. These conferences continue to be run by the Royal Society of Chemistry.

In addition to its presidents, key figures at the Faraday Society included George Stanley Withers Marlow, Secretary and Editor of the society from 1926 to 1948, and his successor Frederick Clifford Tompkins. Tompkins served as Editor until 1977, and as the President of the Faraday Division of the amalgamated Royal Society of Chemistry from 1978 to 1979. Prior to the amalgamation, Tompkins received valuable assistance from D. A. Young, who became Editor as of 1977.

== Presidents ==
- Sir Joseph Swan: 1903–1904
- Lord Kelvin: 1905–1907
- Sir William Henry Perkin: 1907
- Sir Oliver Lodge: 1908–1909
- Sir James Swinburne: 1909–1911
- Sir Richard T. Glazebrook: 1911–1913
- Sir Robert Abbott Hadfield: 1913–1920
- Professor Alfred W Porter: 1920–1922
- Sir Robert Robertson: 1922–1924
- Sir Frederick George Donnan: 1924–1926
- Professor Cecil Henry Desch: 1926–1928
- Professor Thomas Martin Lowry: 1928–1930
- Sir Robert Mond: 1930–1932
- Professor Nevil Vincent Sidgwick: 1932–1934
- William Rintoul: 1934–1936
- Professor Morris William Travers: 1936–1938
- Sir Eric Keightley Rideal: 1938–1945
- Professor William Edward Garner: 1945–1947
- Professor Arthur John Allmand: 1947–1948
- Sir John Lennard-Jones: 1948–1950
- Sir Charles Goodeve: 1950–1952
- Sir Hugh Taylor: 1952–1953
- Professor Ronald George Wreyford Norrish: 1953–1955
- Ronald Percy Bell: 1956–1957
- Sir Harry Work Melville: 1958
- Dr Edgar William Steacie: 1959
- Sir Harry Work Melville: 1960
- Sir Cyril Norman Hinshelwood: 1961–1962
- Professor Alfred Rene Ubbelhode: 1963–1964
- Sir Frederick Sydney Dainton: 1965–1966
- Professor Cecil Bawn: 1967–1968
- Professor Geoffrey Gee: 1969–1970
- Professor John Wilfrid Linnett: 1971–1972

== See also ==
- Marlow Award
