= K. B. Quinan =

American engineer (1878–1948)

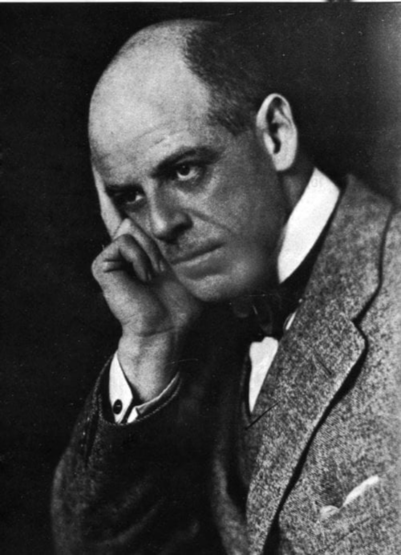
K.B. Quinan

Kenneth Bingham Quinan CH, usually known as K.B. Quinan, (July 3, 1878 – January 26, 1948) was an American born chemical engineer who settled in South Africa and contributed significantly to the British war effort in World War I by designing and building efficient explosives factories.

== Family background ==
Quinan was born in East Orange, New Jersey as the sixth son of Henry Julius Quinan who is said to have served as aide de camp to Stonewall Jackson during the American Civil War (but no record exists of his serving on either side in the Civil War). His father's family was of Protestant Irish origin, while his mother's family, the Wickhams, were of English ancestry.

== Early experience of explosives manufacturing ==
Quinan had no formal qualifications in chemistry or engineering, but in 1890 he joined his uncle W.R. Quinan working in a California industrial explosives factory. Under his uncle's instruction he acquired considerable experience in the technology of explosives manufacture. W.R. Quinan was hired by Cecil Rhodes to build a factory in South Africa to supply explosives for the De Beers mines. K.B. Quinan joined him in 1901 as General Manager of the factory in Somerset West near Cape Town.

By 1909, this was the second biggest explosives factory in the world. Quinan proposed that the company also manufacture glycerine, an essential ingredient in the explosives process. This plant was completed as the First World War started, assuring the mining industry and the South African economy, which largely depended on the output of the mines, would continue to be viable during the war.

== Outbreak of First World War ==
With the outbreak of the war, Britain required to build up its own supply of explosives for munitions. Lord Moulton, chairman of the committee on high explosives, determined that two new factories should be built. As all the British experts were already employed, he requested that an expert from South Africa be found. Quinan was selected and immediately left for Britain. He was later followed by several other senior staff from the South African factory.

During the war, Quinan was responsible for the design, construction and proper operation of a number of large munitions and explosives ingredient factories in Britain. He also wrote many technical reports and even oversaw the activities of the South Africa works.

In 1917, he was one of the first recipients of the Order of the Companions of Honour, and the French government awarded him the Croix de Guerre. He was offered a British knighthood but, as an American citizen, he declined. David Lloyd George publicly thanked him in the House of Commons and commented:

It would be hard to point to anyone who did more to win the war than Kenneth Bingham Quinan.

== Return to South Africa ==
After the end of the war, Quinan returned to South Africa where he continued his work for De Beers at the Somerset West complex. He also became the first vice-president of the Institution of Chemical Engineers. He developed several new processes and increased the output. In 1923 he married, and in 1924 he retired to operate a fruit farm. He spent his time in researching and improving the production of fruit for export, specialising in grapes. Despite his retirement he kept in contact with many of his former employees and colleagues. In 1939, with the outbreak of World War II, his expertise was again sought by the British and South African governments as an advisor on chemical defence matters and to oversee ordnance factories built in South Africa.

== Death ==
He died at his desk at his farm on January 26, 1948.
