= Albert Hinchley =

English footballer

Personal information
- Full name: Albert Aubrey Hinchley
- Date of birth: 1869
- Place of birth: Warwick, England
- Date of death: 1922 (aged 52–53)
- Position: Goalkeeper

Senior career*
Years	Team	Apps	(Gls)
1891–1892	Aston Villa	11	(0)
- * Club domestic league appearances and goals

Albert Aubrey Hinchley (1869–1922) was an English footballer who played in the Football League for Aston Villa.
