= Gary Hinchley =

English footballer

Personal information
- Full name: Gary Hinchley
- Date of birth: 14 November 1968 (age 57)
- Place of birth: Guisborough, England
- Position: Full back

Youth career
- 19??–1986: Darlington

Senior career*
Years	Team	Apps	(Gls)
1986–1988	Darlington	14	(0)
–	Whitby Town		
–	Guisborough Town		
1991–1993	Darlington	13	(1)
–	Whitby Town		
- * Club domestic league appearances and goals

Gary Hinchley (born 14 November 1968) is an English former footballer who made 27 appearances in the Football League playing as a full back for Darlington in the 1980s and 1990s. He also played non-league football for clubs including Whitby Town and Guisborough Town.
