= John Leslie Thomson =

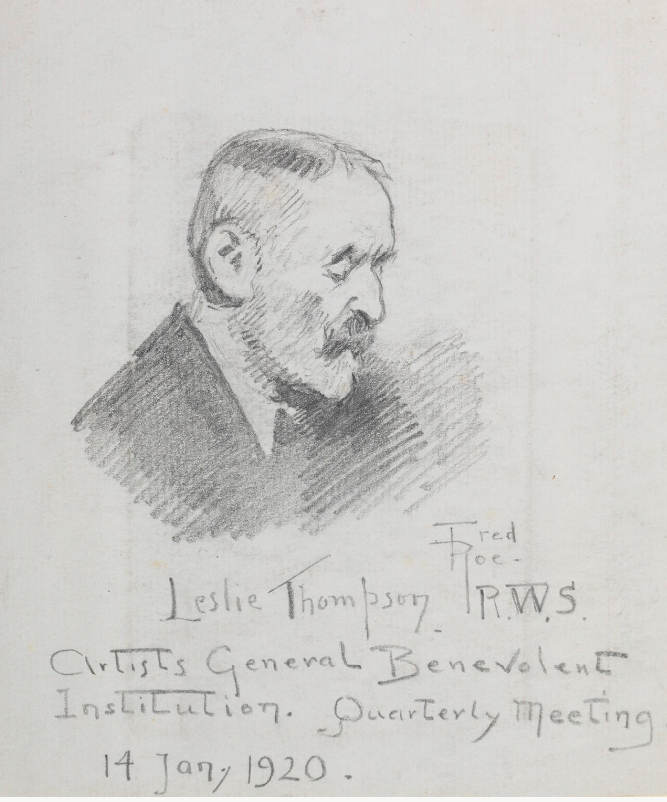
Pencil sketch of John Leslie Thomson by Fred Roe, 1920

John Leslie Thomson (1851-1929) was a British artist. He was born in Aberdeen. He mainly painted coastal scenery and landscapes. He painted both in watercolour and in oils, starting to exhibit his work in London in 1872. His works are exhibited in museums and galleries including The Atkinson, Paisley Museum and Art Galleries, Laing Art Gallery, Victoria and Albert Museum, Glasgow Museums, Bradford Museums and Galleries, Kirkcaldy Galleries, and Perth Art Gallery.

== Gallery ==
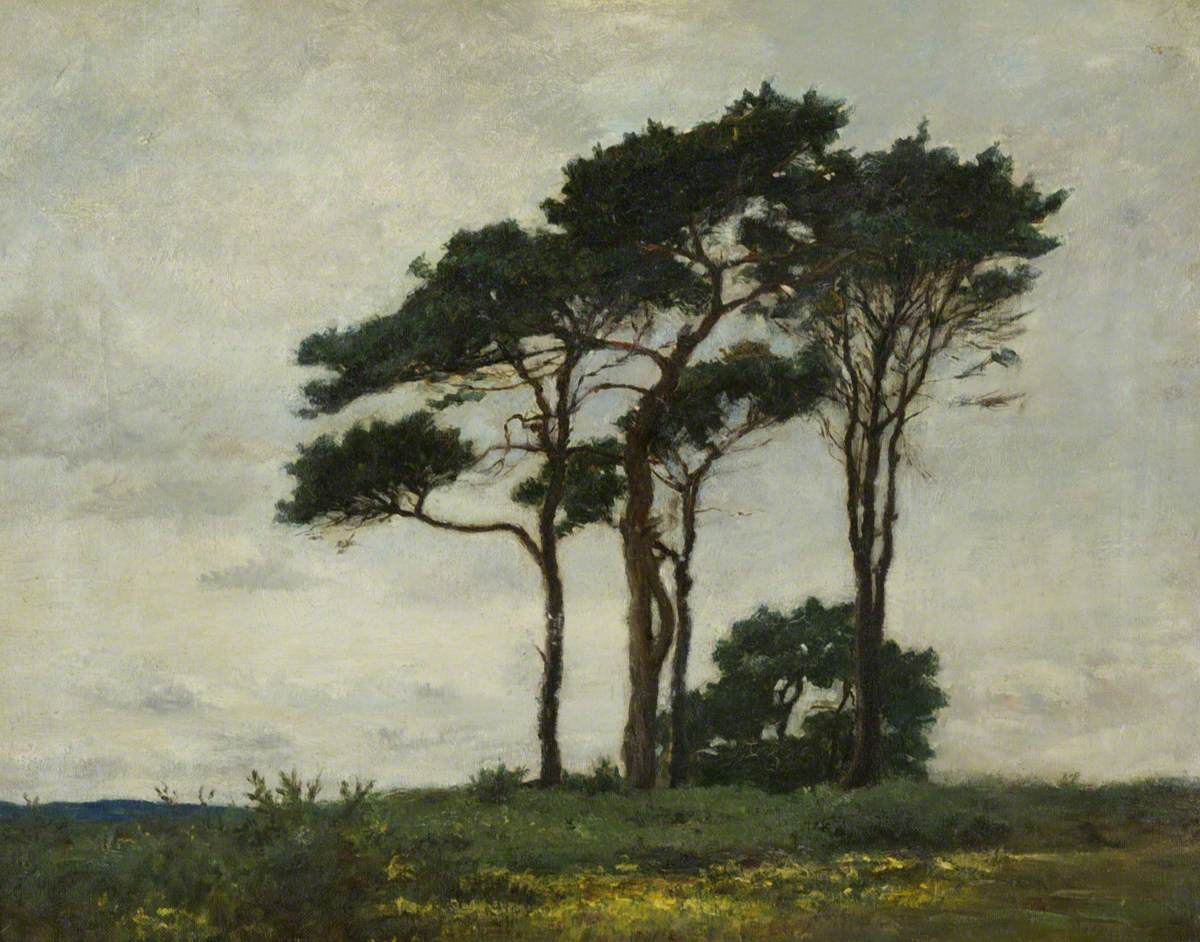
A Group of Firs

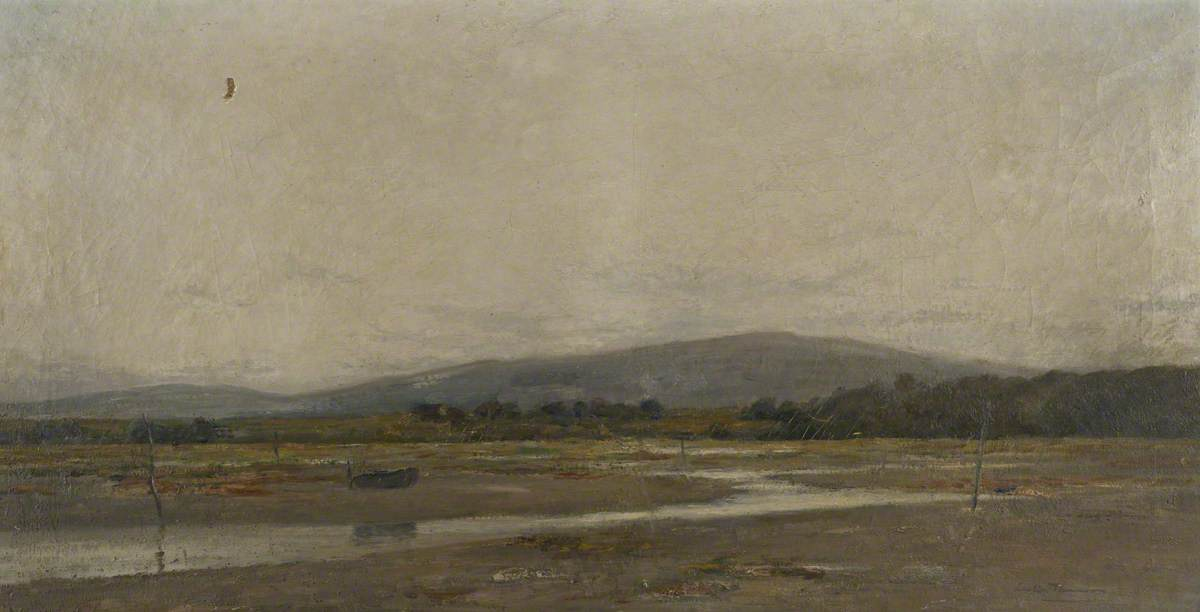
A River Estuary

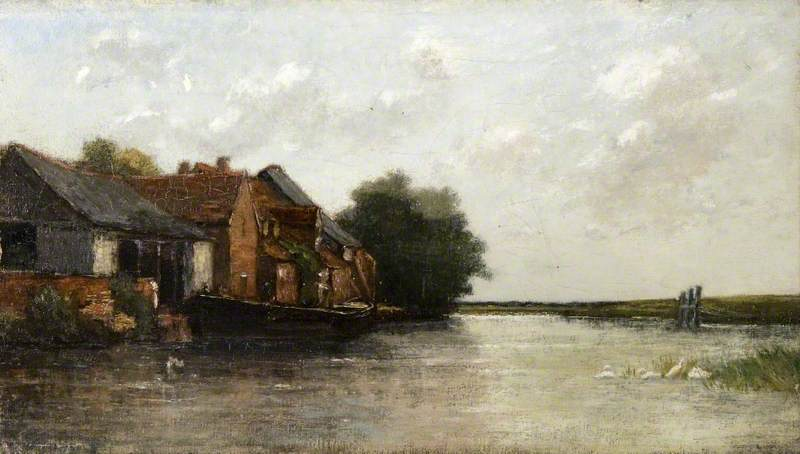
A Suffolk River

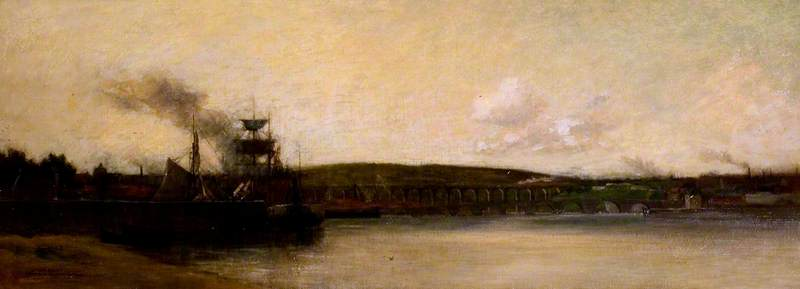
Berwick-on-Tweed (V&A)

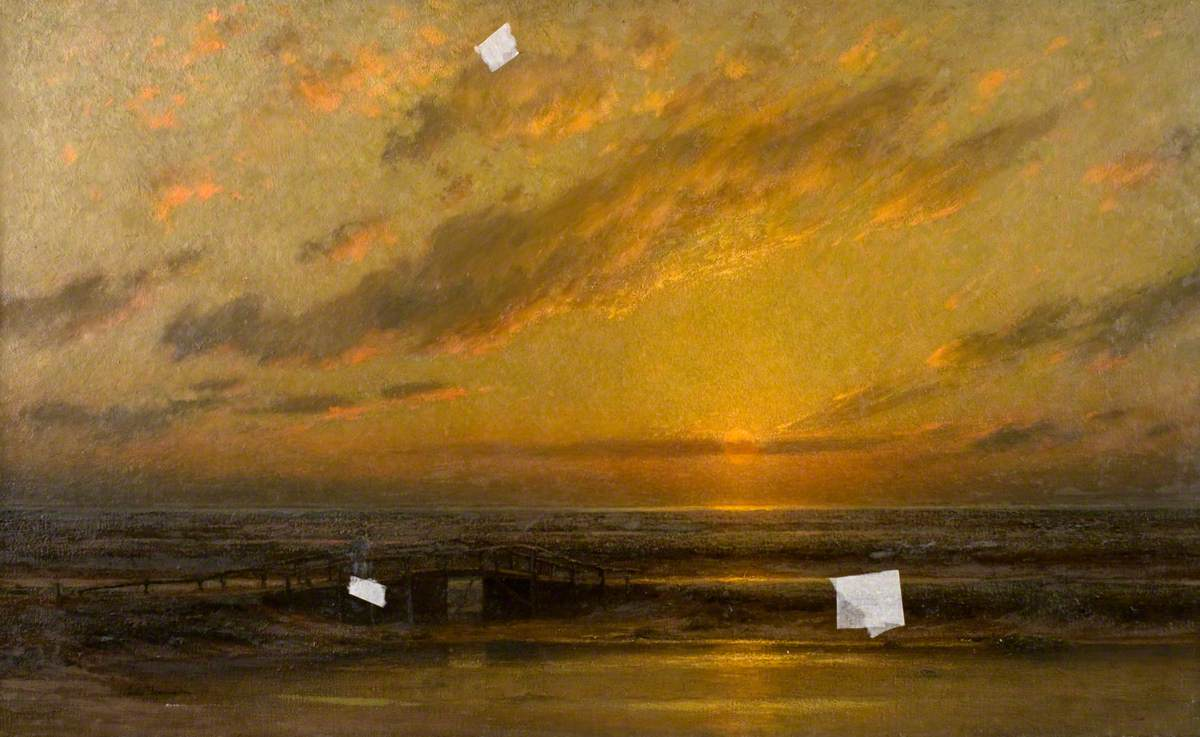
Blakeney Marshes

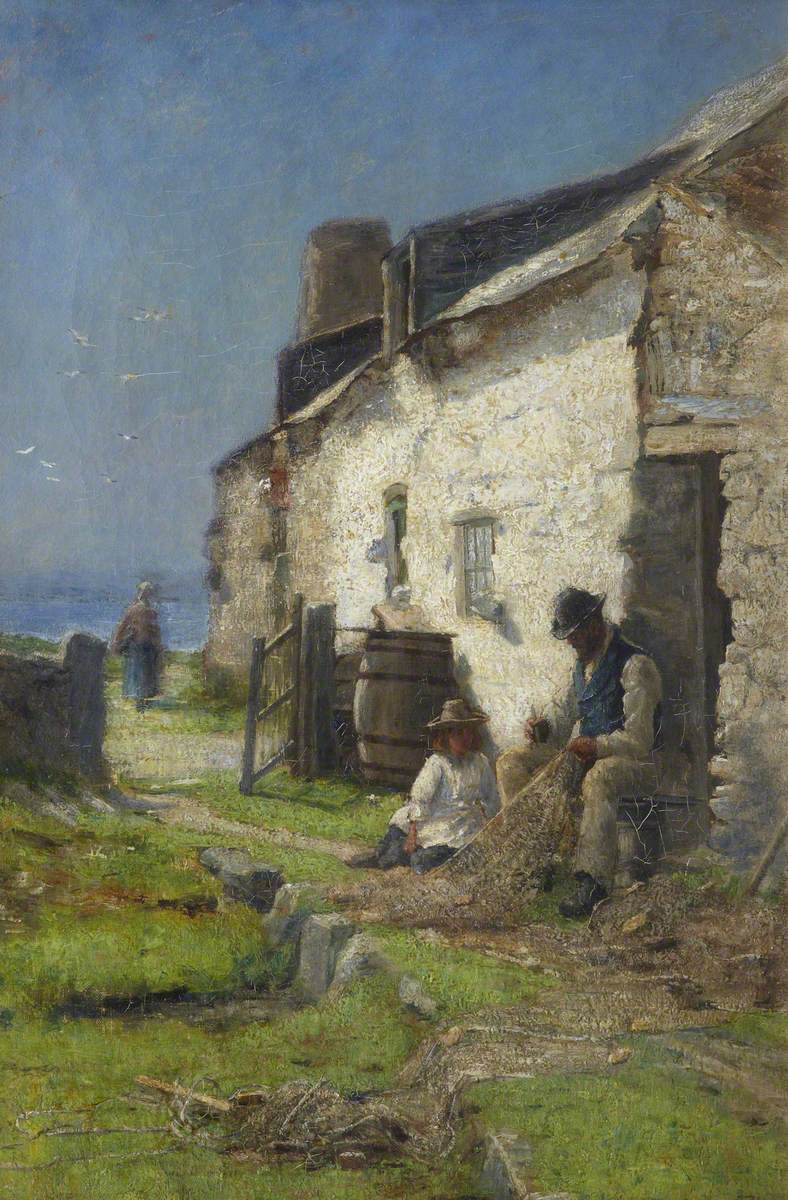
Fishermen Mending Nets

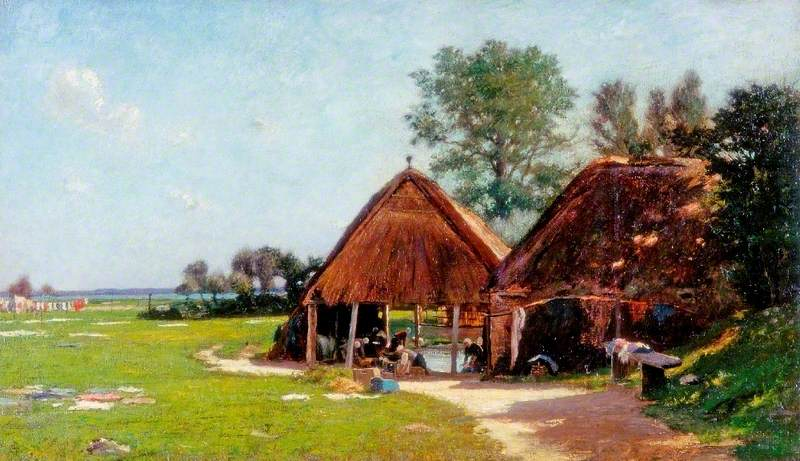
Washing Place, Normandy

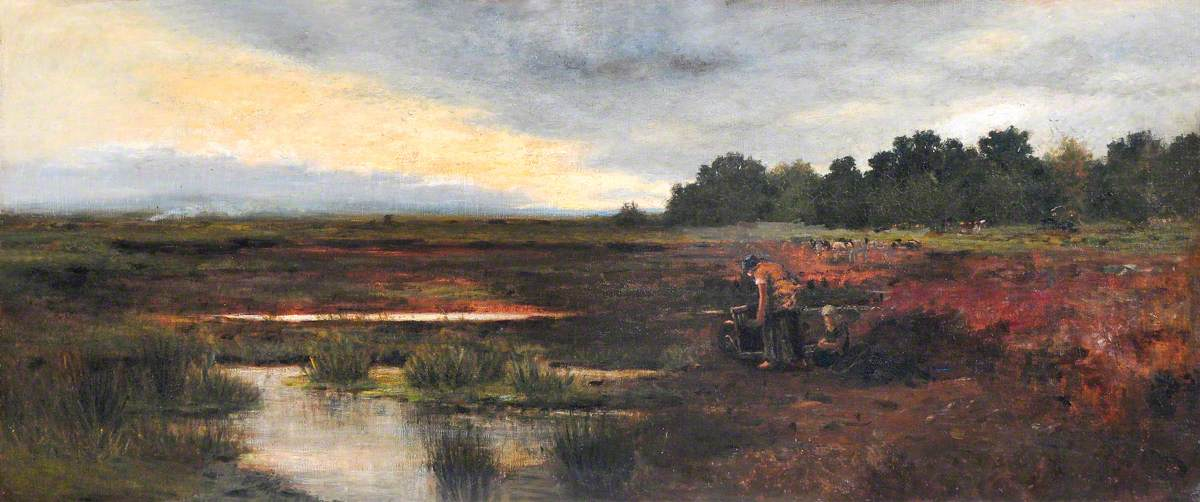
Peat Moss
