= Arthur Duckham =

British chemical engineer

Sir Arthur Duckham KCB GBE
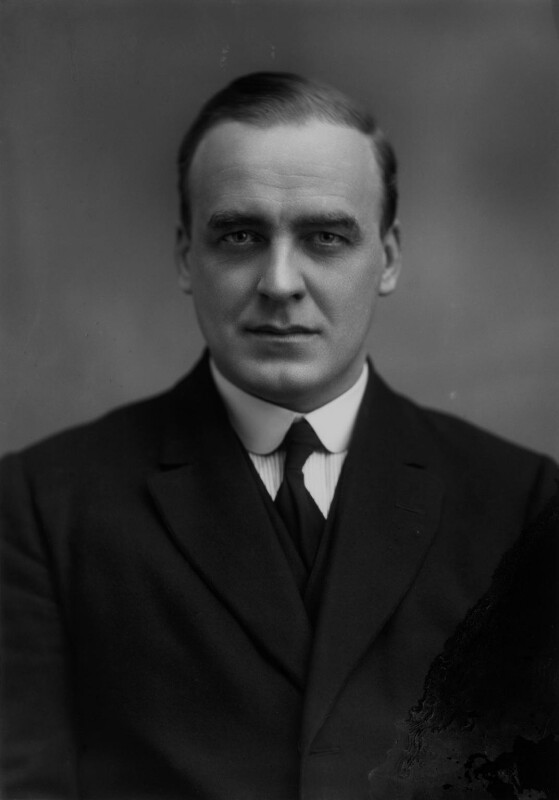
- Duckham in 1917
- Born: 8 July 1879; Blackheath, London, England
- Died: 14 February 1932 (aged 52); London, England
- Spouse: Maud Peppercorn
- Children: 3
- Engineering career
- Discipline: Chemical
- Institutions: Institution of Chemical Engineers; Institution of Civil Engineers
- Awards: Knight Commander of the Order of the Bath; Knight Grand Cross of the British Empire; Légion d'honneur

Sir Arthur McDougall Duckham (8 July 1879 – 14 February 1932) was one of the founders of the Institution of Chemical Engineers, and its first president.

Duckham was born in Blackheath, London, the second son of a Falmouth-born mechanical and civil engineer, Frederic Eliot Duckham (1841 – died 13 January 1918 in Blackheath), who had patented improvements in governors for marine engines and invented a 'Hydrostatic Weighing Machine'. His mother was Maud Mary McDougall (1849–1921), sister of John McDougall of the flour-making family, which had a mill at Millwall Dock. His older brother was Alexander Duckham, notable for the development of machine lubricants.

Arthur Duckham became a trainee gas engineer, while also taking evening classes at King's College, London, and was appointed assistant superintendent of a London gasworks. Along with Harold Woodall he formed a company, Woodall-Duckham, which developed the continuous vertical retort for manufacturing gas from coal.

He married Maud Peppercorn, daughter of Arthur Douglas Peppercorn, and they had three children.

During the First World War he was involved in the supply of coal-derived chemicals for use in the manufacture of explosives, becoming Deputy Controller of Munitions Supply in 1915. He performed a number of other executive and advisor roles, notably Chairman of the Advisory Committee, Ministry of Munitions, which resulted in his being knighted with the Order of the Bath (KCB). He was eventually Director of Aircraft Production. He also received the Légion d'honneur (Cross of Officer).

After the war his business flourished, expanding into other areas of chemical engineering. He joined the Institution of Civil Engineers (which then included all non-military engineers) in 1918, but chaired the committee which created the Institution of Chemical Engineers, and became its first president.

In 1928 he led a British trade mission to Australia, and following this received a further knighthood, GBE.

In Ashstead he offered land to the Girl Guide movement for a new headquarters and was president of the Leatherhead Bowling Club.

He died 14 February 1932 at Ashtead, Surrey.
