= Gerald Cumberland =

British crime writer (1879–1926)

Gerald Cumberland is the pseudonym of the British author, journalist, poet, and composer Charles Frederick Kenyon (1879–1926). Kenyon was a librettist, a writer of essays and of some pieces of police literature.

Trained as a musician, for several years Kenyon was the drama and music critic of Daily Critic. In 1901 under his own as name, he produced a study of the work of the writer and playwright Hall Caine and in 1904, a work for beginner musicians.

As a composer, his musical scores included The Maiden and the Flower Garden (1914), an operetta for children. The orchestration by Julius Harrison of his Cleopatra cantata helped the young Harrison towards recognition as a composer.

In 1919 he used the pseudonym Gerald Cumberland to publish his "Books of Reminiscences", two important critical essays on musical life in England, as well some works of police literature. His book Set Down in Malice was partly based on his two extensive interviews (1906 and 1913) of Edward Elgar, and also describes a meeting with G.B.Shaw as A Terrible Walk.

== Works ==
=== Novels ===
- A Lover at Forty (1900)
- The Poisoner (1921)
- The Cypress Chest (1927)

=== Short stories ===
- Tales of a Cruel Country (1919)

=== Novella ===
- Any Man Who Drinks (1925)

=== Other publications ===
==== As Gerald Cumberland ====
- Set Down in Malice: a Book of Reminiscences (1919)
- Written in Friendship: a Book of Reminiscences (1924)

==== As Charles Frederick Kenyon (or C. Fred Kenyon) ====
- Hall Caine, the Man and the Novelist (1901)
- How to Memorize Music (1904)

=== Compositions ===
- Day and Night (1906), song for tenor and piano
- If I Could Speak (1906), song for tenor and piano
- When I Lie Ill (1906), song for tenor and piano
- Soliloquy Upon a Dead Child (1906), song for soprano or tenor and piano
- The Vision of Cleopatra (1907), cantata for soloists, choir and orchestra
- Fairies' Song (1906), a cappella for two sopranos and two altos
- The Maiden and the Flower Garden (1914), operetta for children's voices and piano
- The Moon (1914), song for soprano, alto and piano
- The River (1914), song for soprano, alto and piano
- Summer Has Come, Little Children (1914), song for soprano, alto and piano
