= Edith Mary Hinchley =

British painter, suffragist, and humanist

- Born: Edith Mary Mason; 23 January 1870; Chelsea, London
- Died: 16 October 1940 (aged 70); Kensington, London
- Other names: Mrs J W Hinchley
- Education: Royal College of Art
- Occupation: Artist
- Spouse: John William Hinchley (m. 1903–1931; his death)

Edith Mary Hinchley (née Mason; 23 January 1870 – 16 October 1940) was a British painter, suffragist, and humanist.

== Early life and education ==
Edith Mary Mason was born in 1870 in the Chelsea area of London where her father was a florist and nurseryman and her mother and sisters ran a shop. Her father died in the 1880s and by the 1890s Hinchley was a student at the Royal College of Art, where she won a silver medal.

== Career ==
From 1897 to 1928 Hinchley showed some 27 works at the Royal Academy in London and also with the Royal Glasgow Institute of the Fine Arts, the Royal Hibernian Academy and in Liverpool and at the Paris Salon. She was elected a member of the Royal Society of Miniature Painters in 1896 and to the Society of Women Artists in 1922.

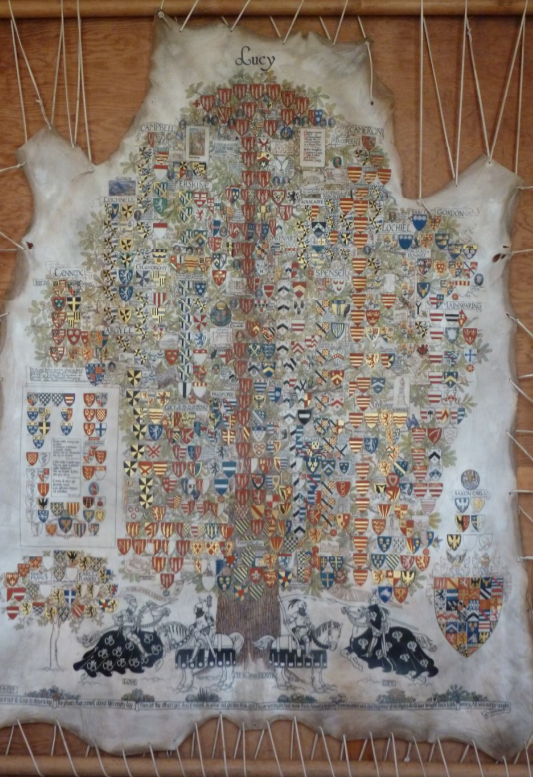
The Lucy Deerskin

In 1890 she worked on a family tree that involved the creation of 500 heraldic shields on deerskin. She is credited with the work because she was a genealogist and a friend of the family concerned. The Lucy Deerskin is held at Charlecote Park in Warwickshire and owned by the National Trust. The heraldry used has been investigated by Christopher Purvis and nearly all of the arms had been identified by 2012.

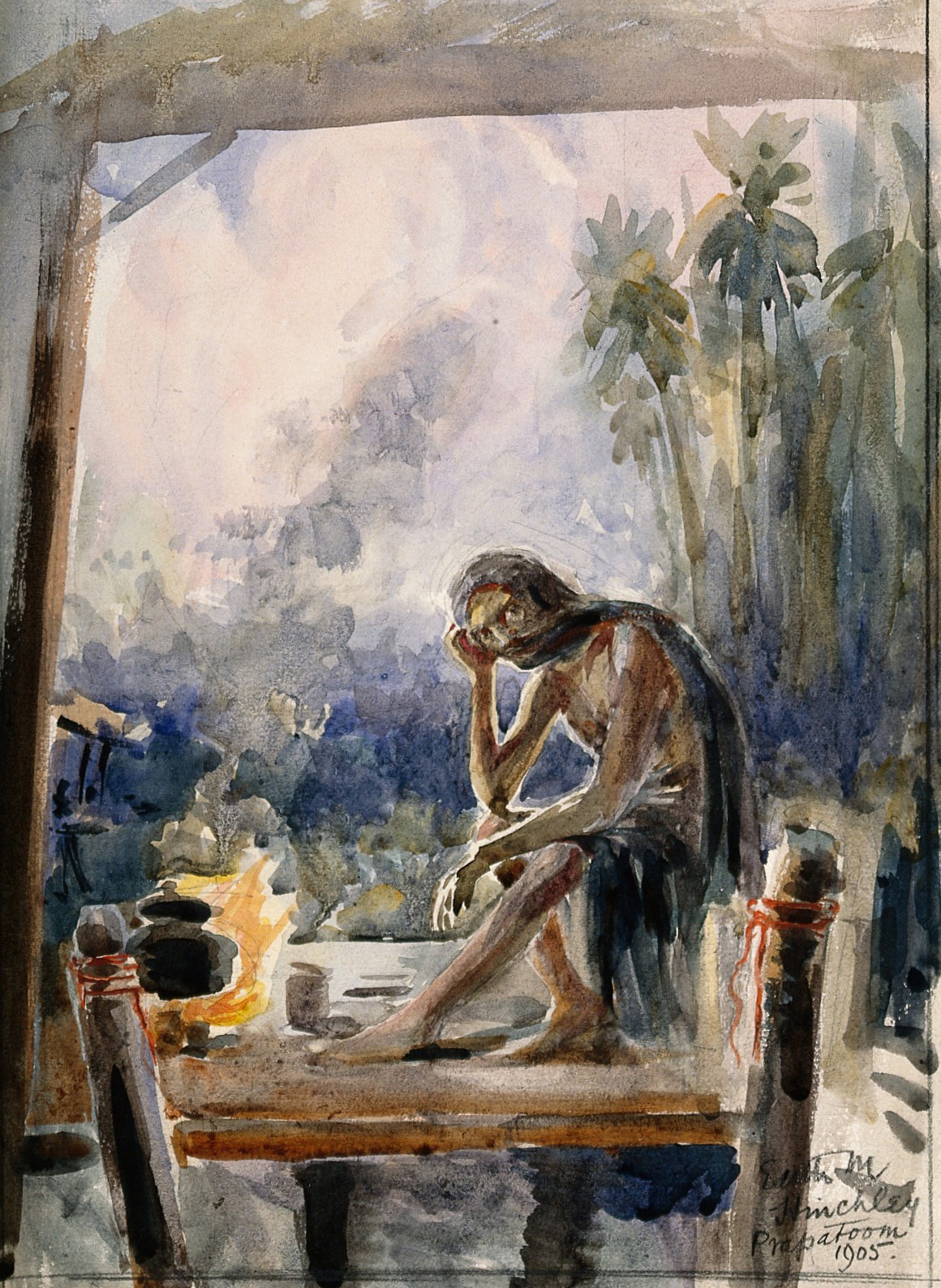
A Leper in Prapatoom, 1905

In 1903, she married chemical engineer John William Hinchley who she had met at the Royal College of Art in London. She had studied art and had some difficulty because her hearing was not perfect and she was obliged to sit at the back of the class because she was a woman. She could not move forward as there was a matron employed to chaperone the female students and who sat between the genders. Her husband left in 1903 for Siam where he was to be the assayist at the Bangkok mint. She sailed out to join him in 1904, where she painted, and they returned to Britain in 1907.

In 1911, Hinchley spoke up for women artists, noting that they had quickly responded to the needs of the suffrage movement. Her article was published in the newspaper of Women's Freedom League which was called The Vote. The Women's Freedom League was a militant suffrage movement that had splintered from the Pankhursts seeking more democracy.

In 1913, Hinchley donated three embroidered robes to the Victoria and Albert Museum. They were from North Africa, one was silk.

In 1923, Hinchley was commissioned to paint a miniature of Princess Helene Victoria which was to be hung in the library of Queen Mary's Dolls' House. The painting is still extant and may be painted on vellum.

Her husband, a leading chemical engineer and freemason, died on 13 August 1931. In 1935, she began to donate antiquities to the British Museum. The objects included metal coins and porcelain items dating back as far as 150 BCE.

In 1937 or 1938, she painted Evan Frederick Morgan, 4th Baron, 2nd Viscount Tredegar. This painting is in the National Trust collection.

== Death and legacy ==
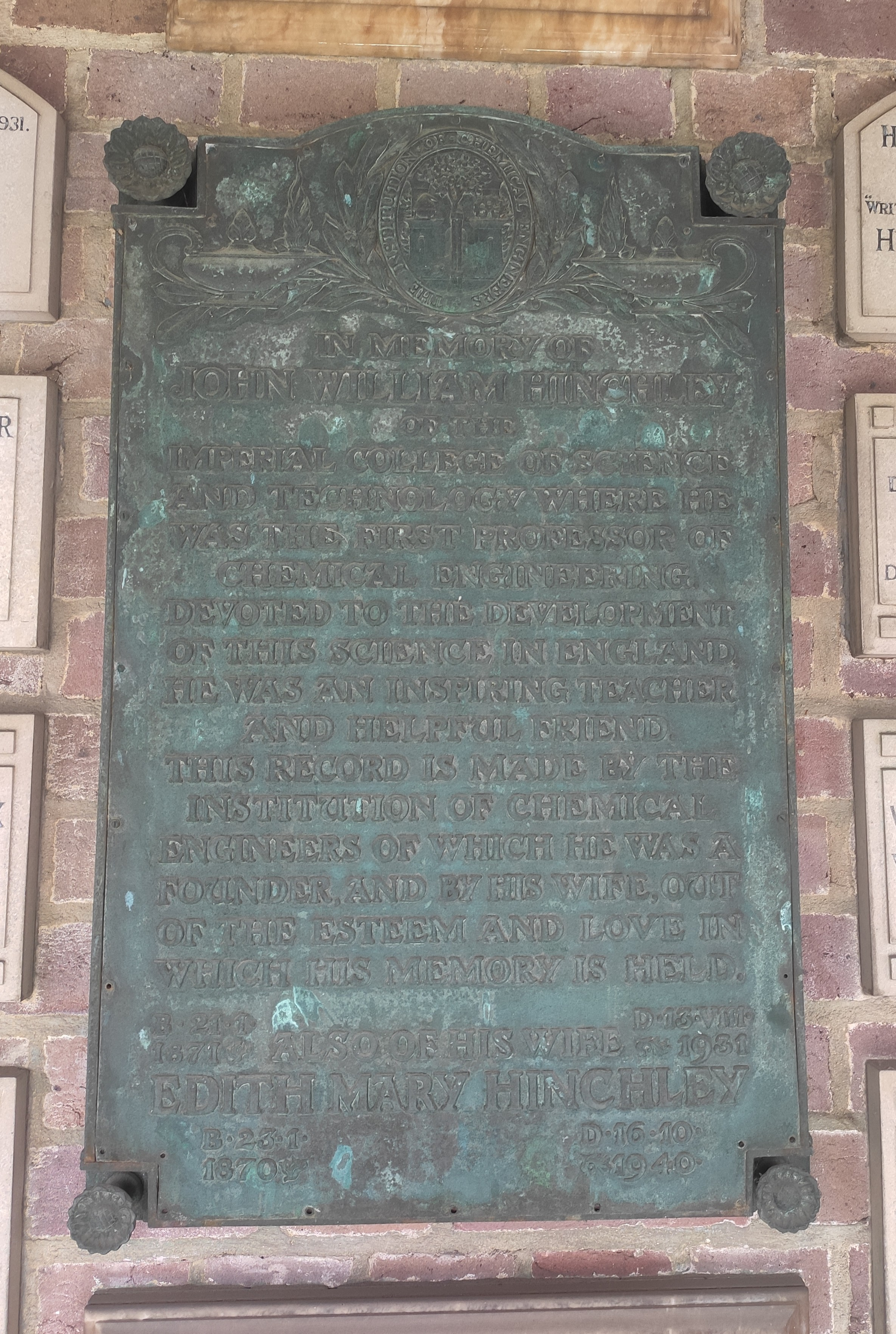
Plaque dedicated to Hinchley and her husband at Golders Green Crematorium

Hinchley died in London in 1940. Her house on Redcliffe Road, off Fulham Rd in Chelsea, was completely destroyed by a bomb during The Blitz; her body and that of her two lodgers were not found until five days later, when notices were run to establish who may be beneficiaries of her estate. She has a painting in the Wellcome Collection titled a Leper in Prapatoom which she completed in 1905. She is remembered on a wall plaque at Golder’s Green Crematorium, erected by Imperial College and Edith following her husband’s death.
