= Bob Boucher (educator) =

Robert Francis Boucher, CBE, FREng (25 April 1940 – 25 March 2009), usually known as Bob Boucher, was a British mechanical engineer, and Vice-Chancellor of both UMIST (1995–2001) the University of Sheffield (2001–2007).

Boucher was born in Wembley on 25 April 1940 and was educated at St Ignatius' College, Stamford Hill, Borough Polytechnic, London, and gained a PhD from the University of Nottingham in Mechanical Engineering in 1966. After postdoctoral work at the same university he moved to Queen's University Belfast as a researcher then a lecturer in mechanical engineering.

In 1970 he joined Sheffield University as a lecturer, rising to Head of the Department of Mechanical Engineering in 1987 and Pro-Vice-Chancellor for Research at Sheffield. In 1995 he took up the position of Vice-Chancellor and Principal of UMIST. In 2001 he returned to Sheffield as Vice-Chancellor until his retirement in 2007. Boucher was Chairman of the International Sector Group of Universities UK and Treasurer of the Association of Commonwealth Universities.

Bob Boucher was appointed a CBE in 2000 "for services to Engineering Research, Industry and Education". He died suddenly on 25 March 2009.

Academic offices
Preceded by Gareth Roberts	Vice-Chancellor of the University of Sheffield; 2001–2007	Succeeded by Keith Burnett
Preceded by Harold Hankins	Vice-Chancellor of UMIST; 1995–2001	Succeeded by John Garside
