= Barnes Wallis Building =

Building at the University of Manchester

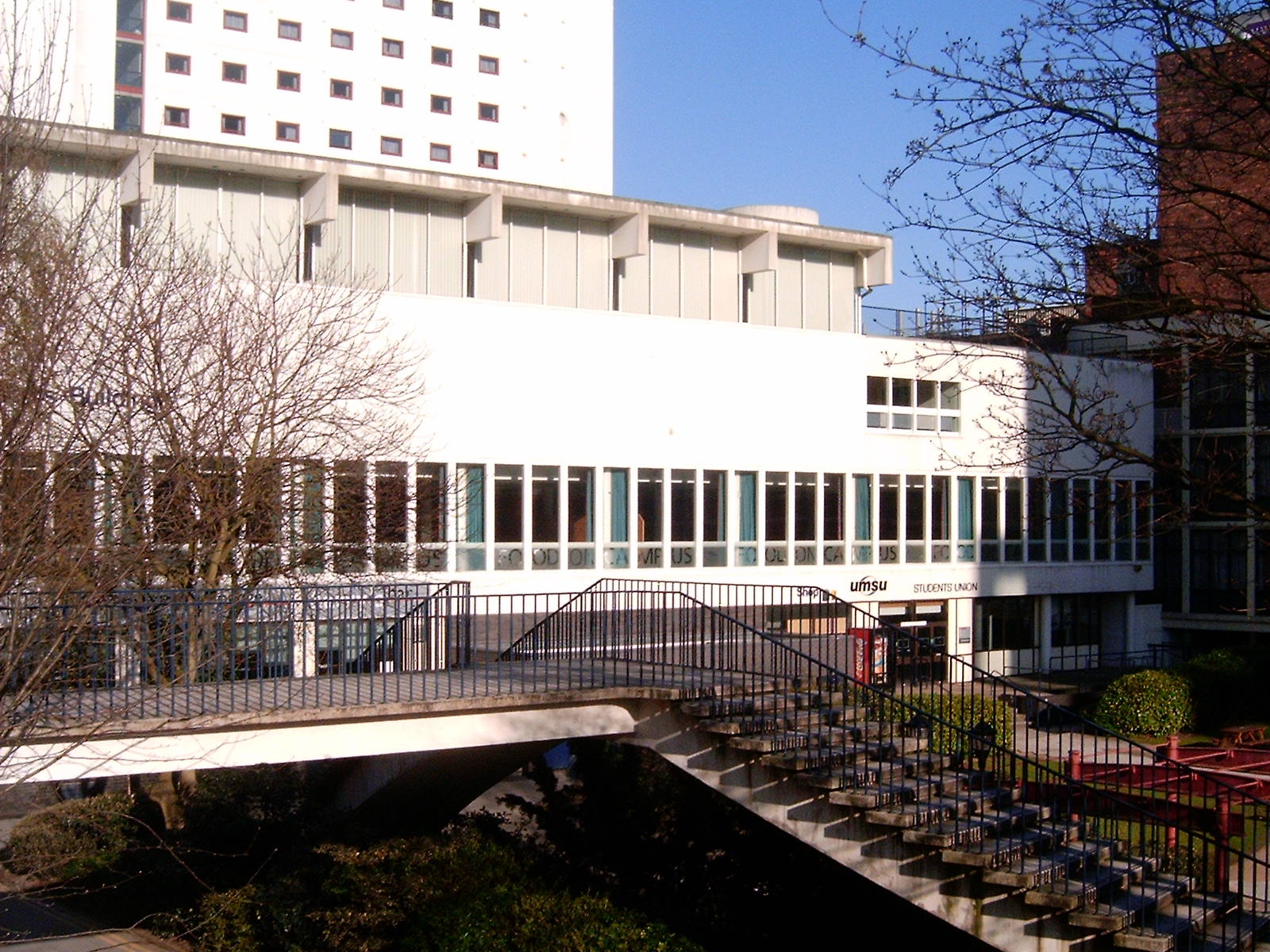
- The Barnes Wallis Building
- Alternative names: Wright Robinson Hall

General information
- Type: Academic
- Coordinates: 53.4752°N 2.2322°W
- Construction started: 1963
- Completed: 1964
- Owner: University of Manchester

Design and construction
- Architect: W. A. Gibbon
- Architecture firm: Cruikshank & Seward

The Barnes Wallis Building/Wright Robinson Hall was a university building in central Manchester. It formed part of the campus of the former University of Manchester Institute of Science and Technology, which merged in 2004 with the nearby Victoria University of Manchester. The site now forms part of Sister (formerly known as ID Manchester,

It is unusual in that the two parts of the building had different names and different uses, though the building is a single structure, purpose-built by a single architect. It was built in 1963–66 and the architect was W. A. Gibbon of Cruikshank & Seward. The building faces across a green space at the centre of campus towards the Renold Building, which was designed by the same architect and constructed the previous year. According to the Pevsner Architectural Guides: "Its scale and form was designed to relate to the earlier building. It is all white concrete. The vertical stabbing funnel on the roof is designed to light the stairs."

The low-rise structure facing onto the green space at the centre of the campus is the Barnes Wallis Building, named after the pioneering aircraft designer Sir Barnes Wallis who opened the building in 1967. This once housed the main campus refectory (closed June 2009), and until 2004 it was also home to UMIST Students' Association. For a number of years it was used by the merged University of Manchester Students' Union with a print shop, bar and shop. The building was for decades a central part of student social life. It was later given over to computer clusters and student workspaces, mostly used by the students of the engineering schools who were still resident in the former UMIST campus. It was also used for conferencing facilities.

Famous from the late 1960s to late 1980s amongst not just students, but also youngsters from across Manchester, for its Saturday Night Dances and Wednesday Technites. Many major rock bands played there, including the Who, the Yardbirds, Chuck Berry, Traffic, Jimi Hendrix, Def Leppard, Dr Feelgood and Nazareth. Its bar was latterly named Harry's Bar after the Principal of UMIST at the time Harold Hankins.

The naming of internal parts of the building was for many years a good indicator of the current political balance of the UMIST Student Union. The Large Assembly Hall was at times called the Lenin Assembly Hall. Conversely, the Small Assembly Hall was at other times named the Sharansky Assembly Hall, after Soviet dissident Natan Sharansky.

The 15-storey high-rise part of the structure is called Wright Robinson Hall, after the trade unionist and Lord Mayor of Manchester Wright Robinson, and was a student hall of residence.

In January 2021, The Guardian listed the Barnes Wallis Building as one of Britain's Brutalist buildings most at risk of demolition and development. It was included in Brutal North: Post-War Modernist Architecture in the North of England, Simon Phipps's photographic study of Brutalist architecture.

In the early 2020s use of the building and other parts of the former UMIST campus came to an end when the Faculty of Science and Engineering based itself at the newly opened Nancy Rothwell Building.
