= Wright Robinson =

British trade unionist and politician

- Born: 1876; Burnley, Lancashire
- Died: 1961
- Occupation(s): Politician, trade unionist
- Years active: 1908-1961
- Organization: Independent Labour Party
- Office: Lord Mayor of Manchester 1941-42

Wright Robinson (1876 – 1961) was a British trade unionist and politician and former Lord Mayor of Manchester. Two educational buildings in Manchester are named after him, Wright Robinson College and Wright Robinson Hall.

== Early life ==
Robinson was born in Burnley in 1876, and the family moved to Blackburn in 1887.

Robinson completed an apprenticeship as a carpenter at the age of 15. When he was 23, he was seriously injured in a fall, and then discovered that he had tuberculosis. He went to Canada to recuperate, returning by 1900.

== Political career ==
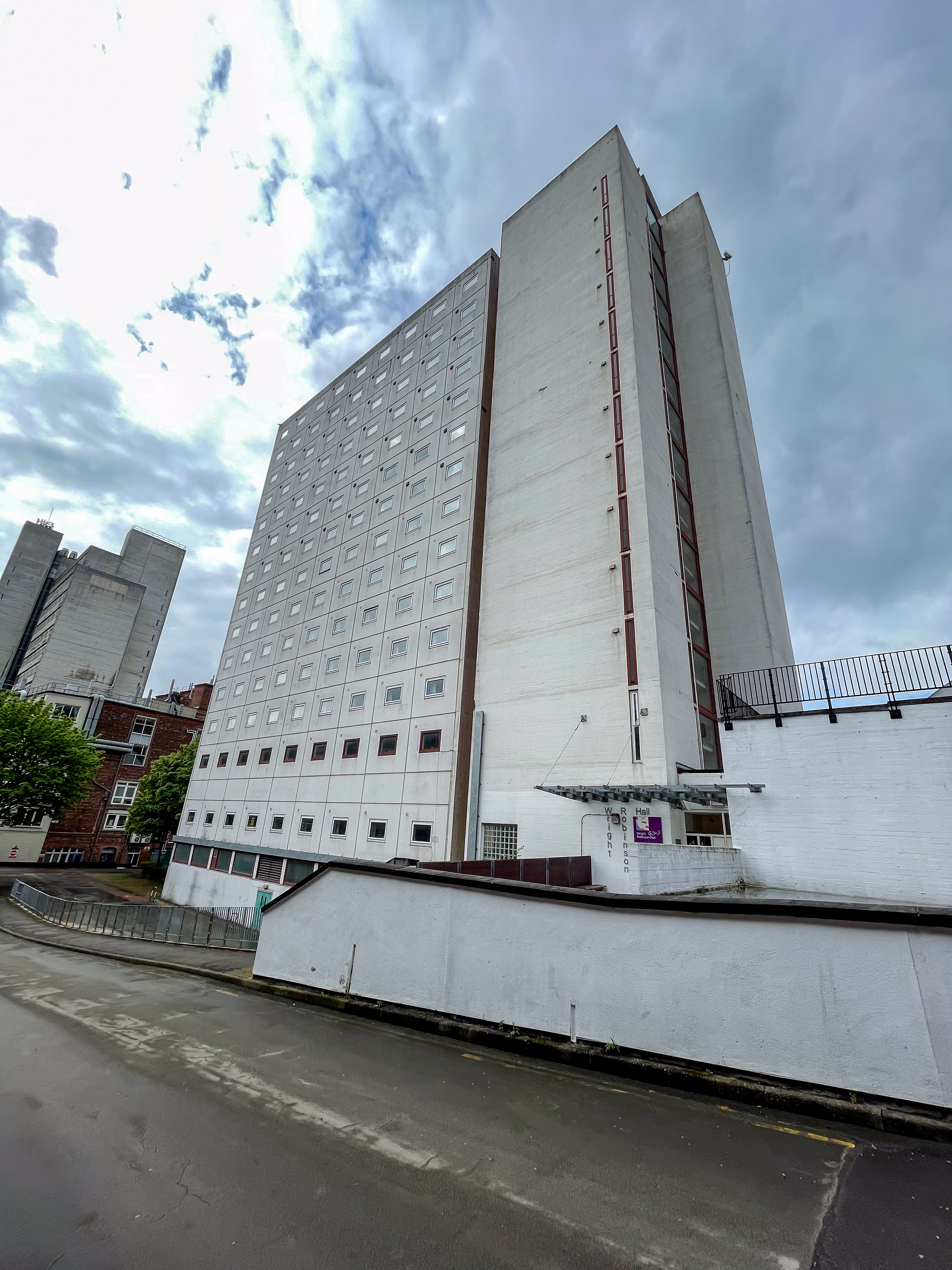
Wright Robinson Hall, University of Manchester

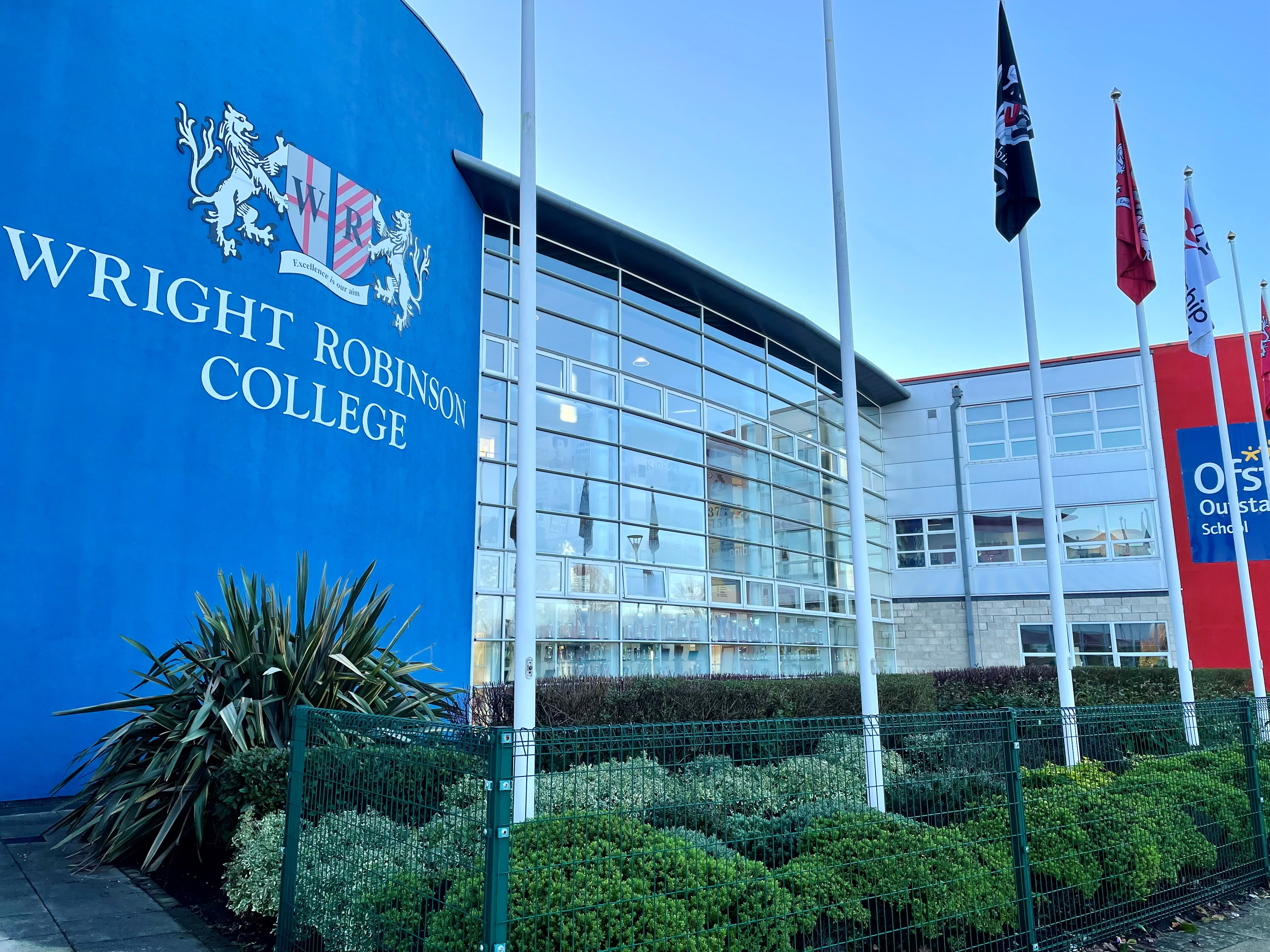
Wright Robinson College

Robinson joined both the Independent Labour Party (ILP) and the Fabian Society in 1908. At the time, he was highly religious, but by the 1920s, he had become a humanist.

In 1911, Robinson was elected to Blackburn council. He moved to Liverpool in 1913 and became the local organiser for the ILP and editor of the Liverpool Forward. During World War I, Robinson was a conscientious objector, and he successfully campaigned for release of Charles Dukes, George Beardsworth and George Benson from prison.

Robinson returned to Manchester in 1917, when he began working for the National Union of Warehouse and General Workers. In 1919, he was elected to Manchester City Council, representing Beswick, then later became an alderman. In 1921, his union became part of the new National Union of Distributive and Allied Workers (NUDAW), with Robinson remaining an organiser.

Robinson moved to Burnage in the 1930s, and retired from NUDAW in 1941. He served as Lord Mayor of Manchester 1941-42.

Despite his pacifism in WWI, by the 1930s Robinson had come to the conclusion that Hitler could only be defeated by war, and during World War II, he promoted co-operation with the Soviet Union. He was rumoured to have rejected a seat in the House of Lords in 1945.

== Education and honours ==
Robinson had little formal education as a child, and he was largely self-taught. In 1943, he was awarded an honorary M.A. by Manchester University. He was rumoured to have rejected a seat in the House of Lords in 1945, and also turned down an OBE in 1945 and a CBE in 1956.

== Personal life ==
In 1917 he married fellow trade unionist Francis Robinson, his second wife. She worked with him in NUDAW until she was forced to resign in 1922 due to opposition to husband-and-wife teams in the union. Francis was an active member of the ILP and was in charge of the party paper, Labour's Northern Voice.

== Death and legacy ==
Wright Robinson died in 1961. His diaries are held in the collection of Manchester Central Library.

Robinson was a committed educationalist, and two educational institutions were named after him, Wright Robinson College in Gorton and Wright Robinson Hall on the UMIST site in Manchester.

Honorary titles
Preceded by Robert Griffith Edwards	Lord Mayor of Manchester; 1941-42	Succeeded by John Septimus Hill
