= Koen Lamberts =

British-Belgian psychologist and academic

President and Vice Chancellor of the University of Sheffield
- Incumbent
- Assumed office November 2018
- Preceded by: Keith Burnett

6th Vice Chancellor of the University of York
- In office January 2014 – November 2018
- Preceded by: Brian Cantor
- Succeeded by: Charlie Jeffery

Personal details
- Born: February 1964 (age 62) Hasselt, Belgium
- Education: Katholieke Universiteit Leuven (BA, BSc); University of Birmingham (MA, PhD)

Academic work
- Discipline: Psychology
- Sub-discipline: Experimental psychology
- Institutions: University of Chicago; University of Birmingham; University of Warwick; University of York; University of Sheffield

Koenraad Lamberts (born February 1964) is a British/Belgian psychologist and academic. Since 2018, he has served as President and Vice-Chancellor of the University of Sheffield. From 2014 to 2018, he was the Vice-Chancellor of the University of York. Previously, he had taught at the University of Chicago, University of Birmingham, and the University of Warwick. Lamberts was chair of UCAS between 2019 and 2020. During his time at Sheffield, Lamberts oversaw the closure of its "world-renowned archaeology department".

== Early life and education ==
Lamberts was born in Hasselt, Belgium. He studied at the Katholieke Universiteit Leuven (KU Leuven). He holds two undergraduate degrees: a Bachelor of Arts (BA) in philosophy (1985) and a Bachelor of Science (BSc) in psychology (1987). He continued his studies in experimental psychology, and completed his Doctor of Philosophy (PhD) degree at the University of Birmingham in 1992.

== Academic career ==
=== Birmingham ===
Following a research appointment at the University of Chicago, Lamberts became a lecturer at the University of Birmingham in 1992. In 1996 he won the British Psychological Society Cognitive Psychology Award, which recognises "outstanding published contributions to research in the area of Cognitive Psychology".

He also won the Experimental Psychology Society Award while at Birmingham, recognising "distinguished, independent and original contributions to experimental psychology made during early career".

=== Warwick ===
Lamberts was Professor of Cognitive Science at the University of Warwick from 2000 to 2013. At Warwick, he served as Faculty Chair for Science, Pro-Vice-Chancellor for Research (Science & Medicine) and Deputy Vice-Chancellor and Provost.

=== University of York ===
From 2014 to 2018, Lamberts was the Vice-Chancellor of the University of York. Since becoming a Vice-Chancellor, a chief executive position within university, Lamberts has had less time to carry out research.

The university considered outsourcing English-language teaching of international students to INTO University Partnerships. The plans to privatise were criticised by the York branch of the University and College Union (UCU), and Lamberts subsequently announced that the partnership had been abandoned.

In 2014, 69 universities in the UK were affected by strikes over proposed changes to pension schemes after a University and College Union (UCU) ballot; the University of York threatened to deduct 100% of striking staff's pay and was prompted to review the decision after a petition and intervention from UCU. During the 2016/17 financial year he claimed £20,743 on expenses in his role as Vice-Chancellor; this was second highest amongst Russell Group VCs, and more than double the average. Student newspaper York Vision reported that along with Deputy Vice-Chancellor Saul Tendler he accounted for 65% of the executive board's £58,000 spending on domestic and international flights. Student news site The Sheffield Tab filed a freedom of information request and revealed that Lamberts spent nearly £11,000 on air travel in 2016/17. The UCU described it as an "embarrassment for the university sector".

=== University of Sheffield ===
In June 2018, he was announced as the new president and vice-chancellor of the University of Sheffield: he took up the post in November 2018. Lamberts was appointed chair of the board of trustees of UCAS in March 2019, replacing Steve Smith who filled the position for seven years. He was replaced by Trudy Norris-Grey in December the next year. In September 2019, a 5,000-protest marched through Sheffield, demanding action to tackle climate change. Lamberts joined the protest and announced that all courses would involve teaching about sustainability.

During the COVID-19 pandemic, the university faced significant financial challenges; in June 2020, Lamberts announced that the University of Sheffield was preparing for a £100-million reduction in income and consequently staff were invited to apply for a voluntary severance scheme as part of measures to reduce budgets by 15%.

In May 2021, Lamberts commissioned a review of Sheffield's Department of Archaeology. Three days after the review was presented to the University Executive Board, it voted to propose the department's closure, provoking widespread objection, with over 25,000 signing a petition against closure within two days. The decision sparked international outrage and, in an open letter to Lamberts encouraging the university to reconsider, the European Association of Archaeologists described the department as a "world-leading Department". Mike Parker-Pearson warned that amongst the projects put at risk by the move was important research on Stonehenge. The decision was confirmed in July, by which time the petition had amassed more than 40,000 signatures and 2,200 letters of support had been submitted.

In October 2024 it was announced that the University of Sheffield was facing a £50m shortfall for the academic year 2024/25. Despite the announcement of a university wide severance scheme to cut staff costs, Lamberts was awarded a 10% salary increase for the following academic year in 2024/25. He also received heavy criticism for claiming £17,799 on business class airfares and 'non standard' rail travel in 2024 (a 68% increase on the previous year), despite previous claims of promoting action against climate change.

== Awards ==
- British Psychological Society Cognitive Psychology Award (1996)
- Experimental Psychology Society Prize (1998)

== Selected publications ==
- Lamberts, Koen; Goldstone, Rob, eds. (2004). Handbook of Cognition. SAGE Publications Ltd. ISBN 9780761972778.
- Lamberts, Koen; Shanks, David, eds. (1997). Knowledge, Concepts and Categories. Psychology Press. ISBN 9780863774911.

== See also ==
- List of chancellors and vice-chancellors of British universities
