= Charles Garonne Renold =

British engineer and pioneer of management science

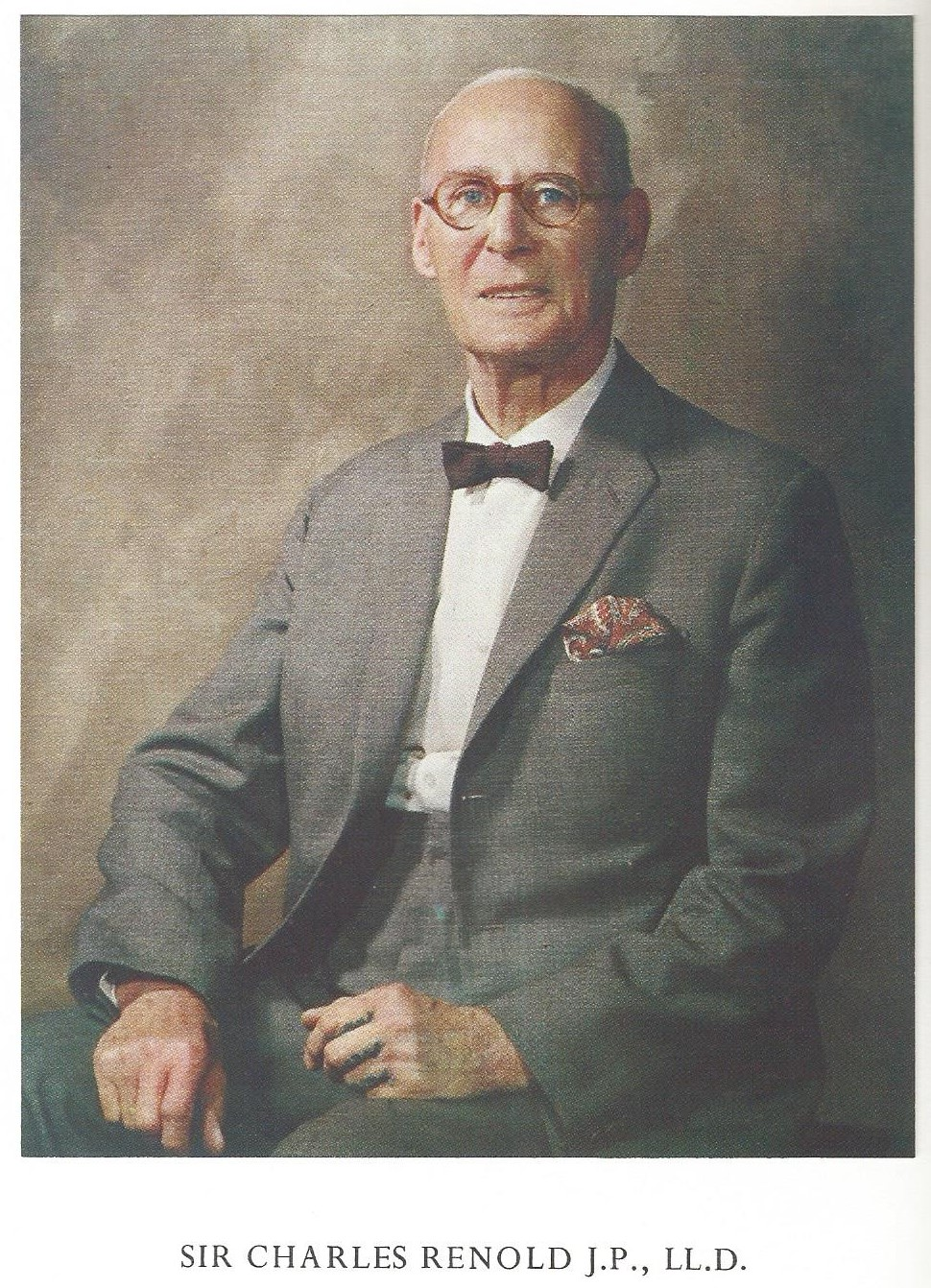

Sir Charles Garonne Renold J.P., LL.D (29 October 1883 – 7 September 1967) was a British engineer and pioneer of management science. Born in Altrincham, England, he was the son of Hans Renold, a Swiss-born engineer and businessman and Mary Susan Herford. He was Director from 1906 of Hans Renold Limited, the company his father started, later managing director (and deputy chairman or chairman) of the Renold and Coventry Chain Company in Manchester 1930–67, which became Renold Chains Limited then Renold Plc.

Renold was vice-president of Manchester College of Science and Technology, which was to become UMIST and was then part of the University of Manchester. During the Great War he offered his services to the government on the Manchester Armaments Committee. A public-spirited civil servant he remained concerned about industrial relations and the fear of sabotage. Like Mather and later Weizmann he was granted an interview by Lloyd George in which he promoted the activities of the Amalgamated Society of Engineers. Renold deliberately disassociated the workers from extremist peace campaigners in order to promote "the industrial issue".

He was a noted expert in industrial administration, and was knighted in 1948 for services to the cause of good management, and the development of humane and progressive ideals in industry

From the first he was interested above all in problems of industrial management: he worked throughout his career to raise the level of effectiveness of British industrial managers by the example of his own firm, and by the promotion of management education.

Renold was educated at Abbotsholme School and Cornell University. He was granted an honorary LL.D. from the Victoria University of Manchester in 1960. He lived in Heaton Mersey, and latterly in Chapel-en-le-Frith, Derbyshire. He the first chairman of the British Institute of Management in 1946 and was knighted in 1948. The Renold Building at the University of Manchester is named in his honour.

He was married twice: to Margaret Hilda Hunter (1909 to 1958 – her death), with whom he had four children (Hans, Peter, Penelope and Timothy); then to Noël Mary Garry (1960 to 1966 – her death).
