= Hans Renold =

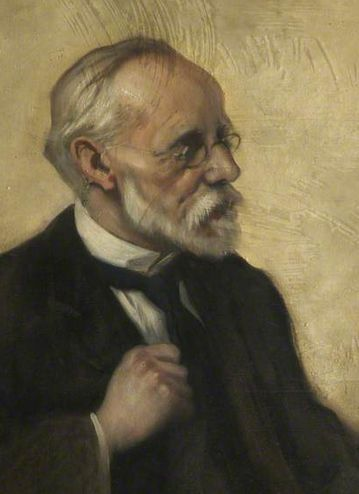
Hans Renold by William H. Myers

Hans Renold (31 July 1852 – 2 May 1943) was a Swiss/British engineer, inventor and industrialist in Britain, who founded the Renold manufacturing textile-chain making business in 1879, and with Alexander Hamilton Church is credited for introducing scientific management also known as Taylorism to England.

== Biography ==
Renold was born in Aarau, Switzerland, into a burgher family of that town. He attended the polytechnic school in Zurich, then worked in a drawing office in Saint-Denis, France.

Renold came to London and soon after to Manchester, Lancashire, in 1873 at the age of 21 and found work with a firm of machinery exporters.

In 1879, with £300 borrowed from his prospective father-in-law, Renold purchased a small textile-chain making business in Salford, Lancashire, from James Slater and started the Hans Renold business.

Hans Renold and his first wife Mary Susan Herford (1855-1919), were married in 1880, and had six children: Mary Katharine Renold, Charles Garonne Renold, Amy Madeleine Renold, Mary Robberds Renold (died young), Hans Herford Renold (died young) and Austen Hugh Renold. He married Rowena Hague Pigott (1874-1962) in 1923.

- Naturalised British subject 1881
- Elected M.I.Mech. E. 1902
- J.P. for City of Manchester 1917
- Honorary D.Sc. from the Victoria University of Manchester 1940

== Work ==
Soon after starting the business in 1879, in 1880 Hans Renold invented the bush roller chain. This represented a great advance on the common pin-and-link chains of the day and laid the design foundation upon which all modern precision roller chains are based. James Starley visited him in Manchester and interested him in providing chains for cycles. He needed them to drive his differential (patented 1877) which he was incorporating into tricycles. The demand for cycle chains increased enormously with the development of the safety bicycle from 1885 by J. K. Starley.

Renold was not only a brilliant engineer and a model employer who built around him a very skilled labour force, but was also a very astute businessman. His business prospered and he steadily ploughed back his growing profits into premises and plant. He moved the business to Brook Street, Manchester, in 1881. In 1889 a rapid expansion of the business took place and a new factory, Progress Works, was built in Brook Street. In 1906, Hans Renold planned and started construction of Renold Works on open land at Burnage, five miles to the south of Manchester.

Renold had long been devoted to the ideal of establishing a firm sense of community among his employees and their families and in 1909 gave his active support to the establishment of the Hans Renold Social Union for the encouragement of a wide range of leisure activities.

After his death in 1943, Priestnall Hey, his former home in Heaton Mersey adjacent to Renold Works at Burnage, was presented by his son for the use of the Hans Renold Social Union.

Hans Renold Limited was formed as a private limited company in 1903. It merged with The Coventry Chain Company Limited and was registered as a public limited company named Renold and Coventry Chain Company Limited in 1930. It was renamed Renold Ltd. in 1967, and later became Renold PLC. The company still bears his name.

== Patents ==
- Renold, Hans. "Driving-chain." U.S. Patent No. 690,317. 31 Dec. 1901.
- Renold, Hans. "A Corpora." U.S. Patent No. 690,318. 31 Dec. 1901.
- Renold, Hans. "Driving-chain" HANS RENOLD." U.S. Patent No. 1,134,010. 30 Mar. 1915.
- Renold, Hans. "Driving-chain of the silent type." U.S. Patent No. 1180539. April 25, 1916.
