= Keith Burnett =

Welsh physicist (born 1953)

Sir Keith Burnett CBE FRS FLSW FInstP
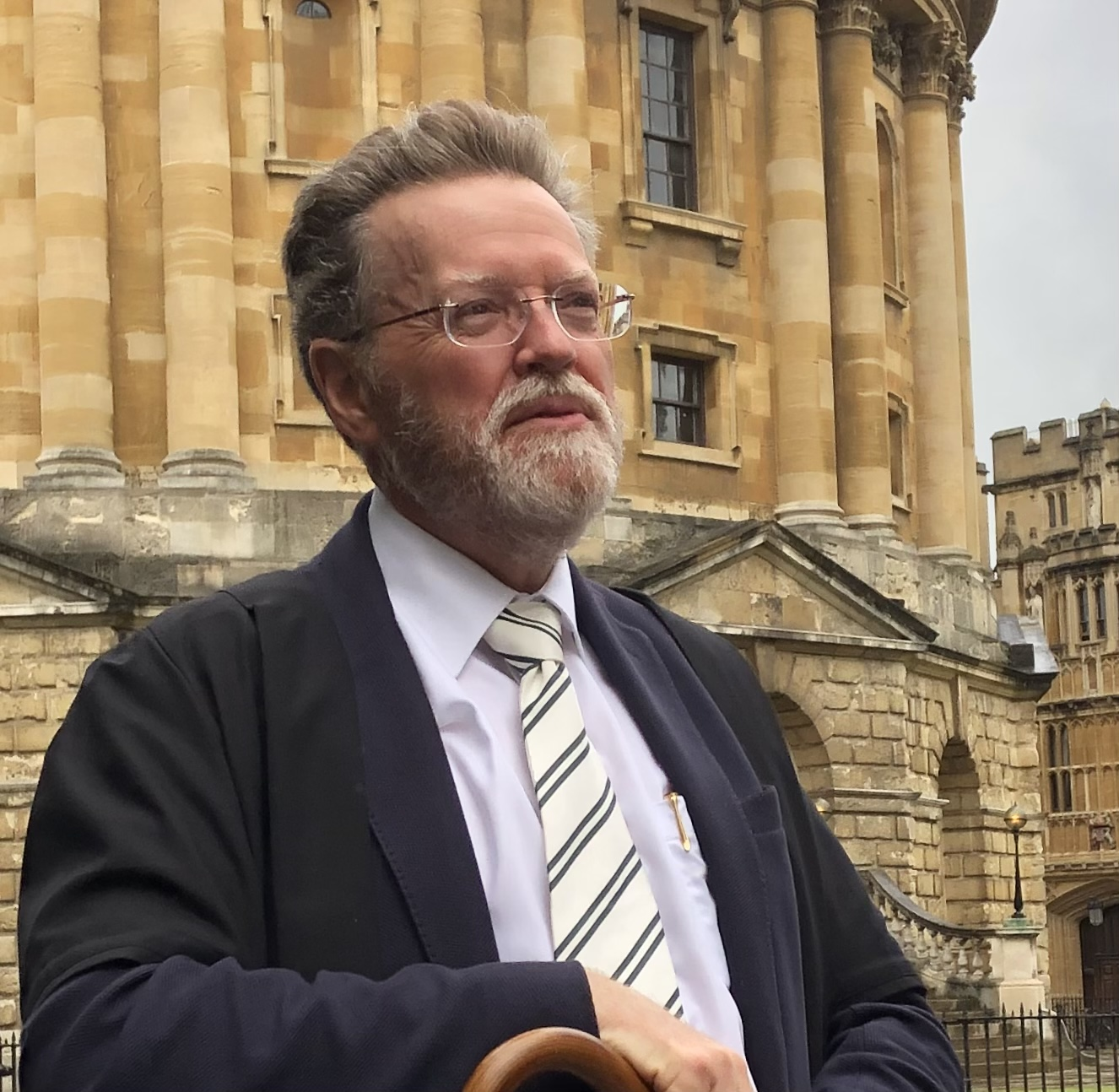
- Sir Keith Burnett, August 2018
- Born: 30 September 1953 (age 73); Llwynypia, Wales
- Education: University of Oxford (BA, DPhil)
- Awards: Young Medal and Prize (1997)
- Scientific career
- Fields: Physics
- Workplaces: University of Sheffield; University of Oxford; University of Colorado; Imperial College
- Thesis: Theoretical and experimental studies of spectroscopically observed relaxation progresses (1978)

Sir Keith Burnett, CBE, FRS, FLSW, FInstP (born 30 September 1953) is a Welsh physicist and former President of the Institute of Physics. He is Chair of the Nuffield Foundation — an independent charitable trust with a mission to advance educational opportunity and social well-being, founding Chair of the Academic Council the Schmidt Science Fellows, and a member of the Board of international education providers Study Group.

Burnett is past Vice-Chancellor of the University of Sheffield. Burnett announced his retirement in January 2018 and he stepped down in September of that year when he was succeeded by Koen Lamberts. He received an Honorary degree from the University of Sheffield in July 2022. He is an honorary fellow of Jesus College, Oxford and St John's College, Oxford where he was a tutorial fellow for 20 years.

Burnett has a long-standing commitment to vocational and technical education, advocating for the development of high-level vocational education and apprenticeships and serving as the President of the Science Council and on the board of the National Technician Development Centre and of Heated.

== Biography ==
Burnett was born in Llwynypia in the Rhondda Valley. He attended the Brynteg School before studying Physics at Jesus College, Oxford obtaining a BA degree in 1975 then a DPhil degree in 1979. He held academic positions in Physics at the University of Colorado, Imperial College and the University of Oxford before taking up the role of vice chancellor at the University of Sheffield in 2007. During his time at the University of Oxford he was appointed Chairman of Physics and then Head of the Division of Mathematical, Physical and Life Sciences. His research includes the study of Bose–Einstein condensates.

== Memberships ==
He was Chair of the board of the Universities and Colleges Employers Association (UCEA) from October 2009 to September 2011.

On 1 November 2010, he was appointed as a non-executive director of the United Kingdom Atomic Energy Authority, a position he was due to hold until October 2013.

He is also currently a member of the United Kingdom government's Council for Science and Technology, and in September 2016 was elected president of the Science Council. He was appointed to the Advisory Council of Infrastructure UK in 2012 to advise the UK treasury on investments including on energy, transport, waste, flood, science, water and telecoms. In March 2015 he joined the management board of HEFCE. In 2021 he was elected President-elect of the Institute of Physics, serving on the IoP Council until taking up the post of President in 2023.

== Personal ==
He is married and has two children. His interests include the Chinese language and culture.

== Honours ==
He was awarded the Young Medal and Prize in 1997 for his physics research and in 2001 was elected a Fellow of the Royal Society. He was appointed Commander of the Order of the British Empire (CBE) in 2004 for services to physics, and knighted for services to science and higher education in the 2013 New Year Honours. In 2013, he was elected a Fellow of the Learned Society of Wales.

Academic offices
Preceded by Bob Boucher	Vice-Chancellor of the University of Sheffield; 2007–2018	Succeeded by Koen Lamberts
