= John Garside =

British chemical engineer

John Garside is a British chemical engineer who was the last Vice-Chancellor of UMIST.

== Life ==
Garside was born 9 October 1941, and studied chemical engineering at University College, London (UCL), gaining a BSc in 1963 and PhD in 1966. He then worked for ICI in Teesside before becoming a lecturer, then later, a reader in chemical engineering at UCL. During this time, he was Fulbright Senior Scholar at Iowa State University in 1976. In 1982, he was appointed professor and head of the Chemical Engineering Department at UMIST. In 2000, Garside became the Vice-Chancellor of UMIST, and oversaw its merger with the University of Manchester in 2004. The same year he was appointed a CBE for "services to education". The John Garside building at the University, which houses the Manchester Institute of Biotechnology, was named in his honour.

Garside has served as president of the Institution of Chemical Engineers and Executive Vice-President of the European Federation of Chemical Engineering (EFCE).

His research interest is crystallization. In addition to books and publications on this topic, he also chaired the EFCE Working Party on Crystallization.

He was elected a Fellow of the Royal Academy of Engineering in 1988.

== Publications ==
- John Garside & Roger Davey (2000) From Molecules to Crystallizers: An Introduction to Crystallization (Oxford Chemistry Primers) ISBN 0198504896
- John Garside, Alfons Mersmann & Jaroslav Nyvlt (2002)Measurement of Crystal Growth Rates (IChemE, Rugby) ISBN 0852954492
- S.J. Jancic, J. Garside (1975) "On the determination of crystallization kinetics from crystal size distribution data" Chemical Engineering Science, 30, (1975) 1299
- S.J. Jancic, J. Garside (1976) "A new technique for accurate crystal size distribution analysis in an MSMPR crystallizer" Industrial Crystallization (edited by J.W. Mullin) Plenum Press, New York 1976
- J. Garside, S.J. Jancic (1976) "Prediction and measurement of crystal size distributions for size-dependent growth", 69-th AICHE Annual Meeting, Chicago, 28 November – 2 December 1976
- O. Söhnel, J. Garside, S.J. Jancic (1977) "Crystallization from solution and the thermodynamics of electrolytes", Journal of Crystal Growth 39, (1977), 307
- J. Garside, S.J. Jancic (1978)"Prediction and measurement of crystal size distributions for size-dependent growth" Chemical Engineering Science, 33, (1978), 1623
- J. Garside, S.J. Jancic(1979) "Measurement and scale-up of Secondary Nucleation Kinetics for the potash alum-water system", AICHE Journal Vol. 25, no. 6, (1979), 948
