= Renold Building =

University building in Manchester, England

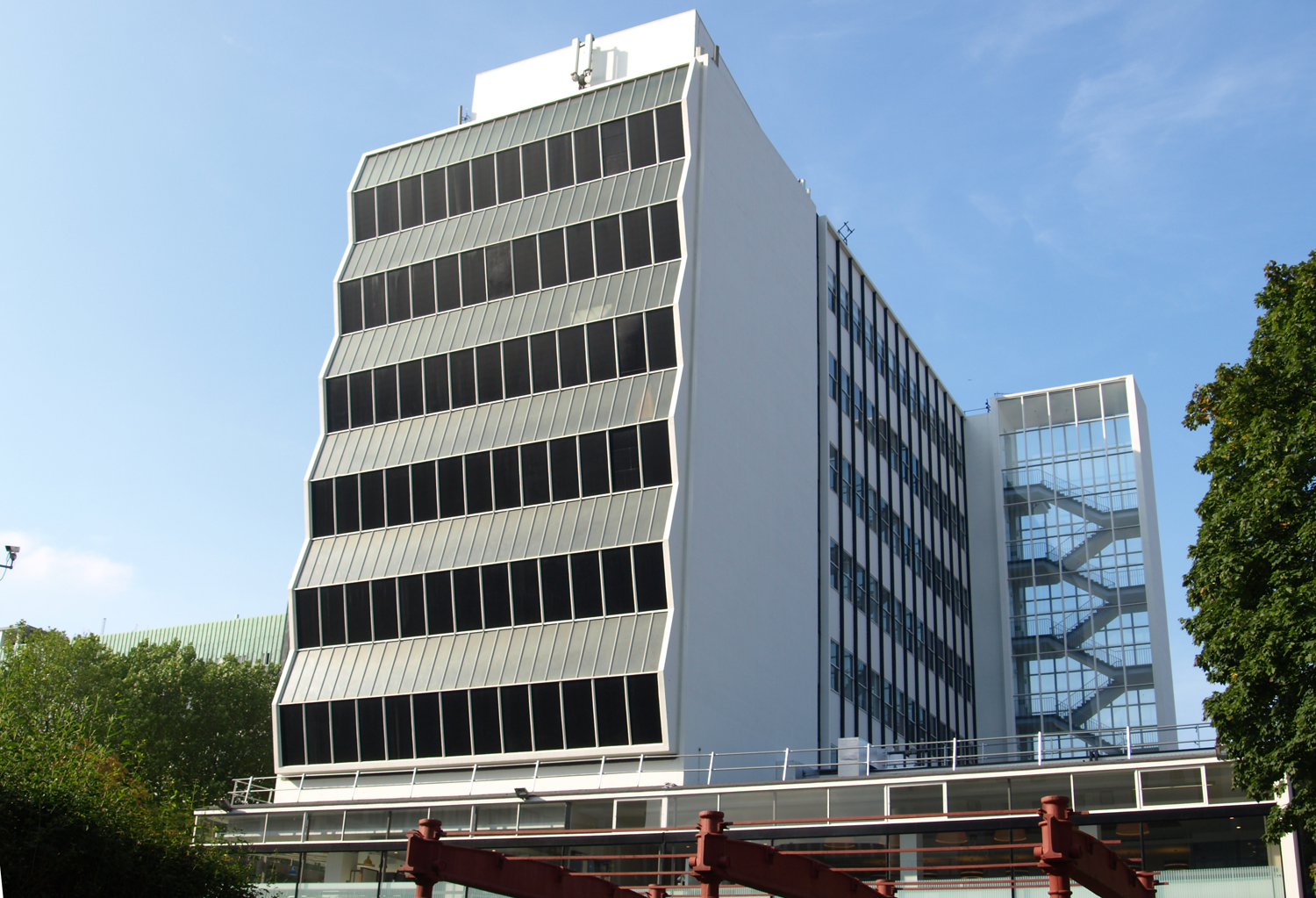
- The Renold Building
- Interactive map of the Renold Building area

General information
- Type: Academic
- Location: 32 Altrincham St, Manchester, England
- Coordinates: 53.4749°N 2.2336°W
- Construction started: 24 June 1960
- Inaugurated: 1962
- Owner: Bruntwood SciTech

Technical details
- Floor count: 8

Design and construction
- Architect: W. A. Gibbon
- Architecture firm: Cruikshank and Seward

Listed Building – Grade II
- Official name: Renold Building, UMIST Campus
- Designated: 31 July 2025
- Reference no.: 1491623

The Renold Building is a university building in Manchester, England. It was opened on 23 November 1962 for the Manchester College of Science and Technology (later UMIST) as part of a major expansion of its campus in the 1960s. The architect was W. A. Gibbon of the firm Cruickshank and Seward. The foundation stone was laid on 24 June 1960 by Sir Charles Renold J.P. LL.D (1883–1967), vice president of the college, and chairman of the planning and development committee, after whom it was named. The main contractor was J. Gerrard & Sons Ltd of Swinton.

== Overview ==
The building, which is made of concrete, consists of a two-storey base supporting a six-storey tower. There is a large glass-sided stair tower on the side. Inside is an entrance hall on two levels with a large mural titled Metamorphosis, by Victor Pasmore.

The Renold Building contains a number of lecture halls of differing sizes, including a 500-seat theatre, two 300-seat theatres, and five 140-seat theatres. According to Pevsner's Architectural Guide, "The idea was to provide a central facility for rooms that would otherwise have been dispersed amongst separate departmental buildings. This was a new initiative in British academic planning at that time."

The building also contains seminar rooms and exhibition spaces. It overlooks a green space in the centre of what was the UMIST Campus which was originally a bowling green. For this reason a bar in the Renold Building was named the Bowling Green Tavern. The building no longer has a bar, but instead has a cafe named Enigma. Although the building has attracted some criticism, in January 2008 it narrowly missed out on being awarded listed status.

In January 2021, The Guardian listed the Renold Building as one of Britain's Brutalist buildings most at risk of demolition and development. It was included in Brutal North: Post-War Modernist Architecture in the North of England, Simon Phipps's photographic study of Brutalist architecture.

In July 2025, the Renold Building was designated a Grade II listed building.

== See also ==
- Listed buildings in Manchester-M1

== Sources ==
- Pevsner Architectural Guides — Manchester, Clare Hartwell, ISBN 0-14-071131-7
