= Manchester Institute of Biotechnology =

Research institute in the UK

Coordinates: 53°28′23″N 2°14′08″W

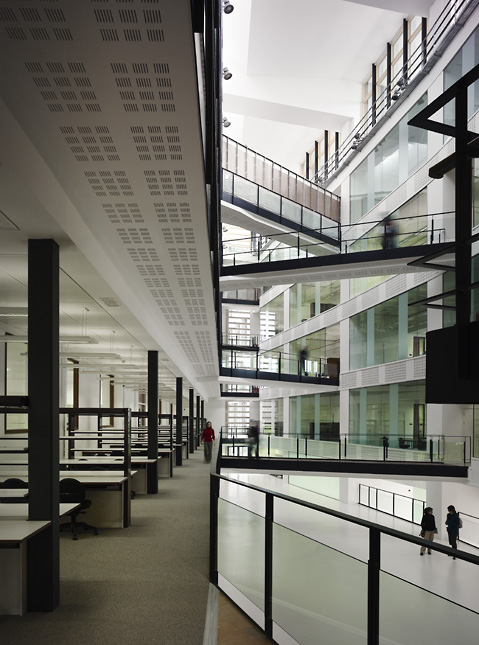
The atrium of the Manchester Interdisciplinary Biocentre, University of Manchester.

The Manchester Institute of Biotechnology, formerly the Manchester Interdisciplinary Biocentre (MIB) is a research institute of the University of Manchester, England.

== Role ==
The centre was designed to enable academic communities to explore specific areas of interdisciplinary quantitative bioscience, largely through the efforts of multidisciplinary research teams. The original research portfolio was centred around three broadly defined, interdisciplinary and complementary themes: Biological Mechanism and Catalysis, Molecular Bioengineering, and Systems biology.

The MIB Research is now centred around mission priorities that include: fundamental bioscience and technology development; delivery of bio-based chemicals and materials for clean growth; new biotechnologies for production and delivery of advanced therapeutics; and the engineering biological solutions for environmental protection.

Since its inception the institute has become internationally known for its research strengths in industrial biotechnology with state-of-the-art facilities for biomolecule engineering. Strengths include: Enzyme engineering and industrial biocatalysts; structural and computational biology, microbial and microbiome engineering; and biotechnology for materials and health.

The institute now houses 40 academic research groups with approximately 400 staff and postgraduate researchers.

== History ==
Planning for the institute began late in 1998 and culminated with the official opening on 25 October 2006 of the John Garside Building. The building won "Building of the Year" from Manchester Chamber's Building and Development Committee in 2006 along with Beetham Tower, Manchester.

The building has featured in several television commercials, notably Injury Lawyers 4u.

The institute was renamed the Manchester Institute of Biotechnology on 1 June 2012, retaining the acronym MIB.

In November 2019 the MIB was awarded the Queen’s Anniversary Prize for Higher and Further Education. The award is a recognition of the MIB as a 'beacon of excellence' for work in Industrial Biotechnology.
