= Saul Tendler =

British pharmacy academic (born 1961)

Saul Tendler FRPharmS CChem FRSC
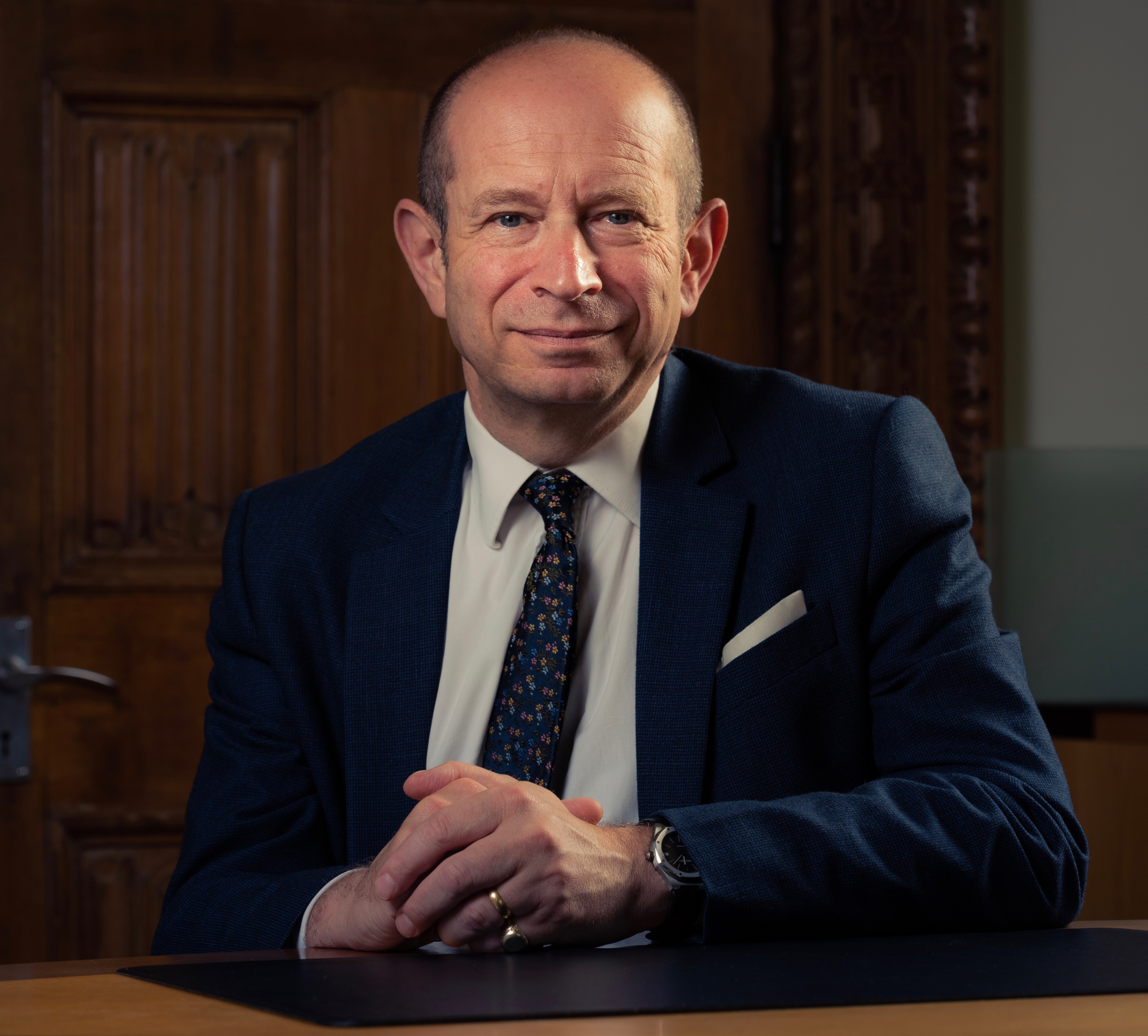
- Saul Tendler
- Born: May 1961 (age 64); Watford, England
- Occupation: Biomolecular scientist

Saul Tendler a British pharmacy academic, his research area is biomolecular structure and interaction.

== Career and background ==
His academic background is Pharmacy, he studied at Manchester University (1979–1982) and subsequently obtained his PhD at Aston University (1983–1986). Following this, he was an MRC Training Fellow at NIMR Mill Hill.

He was made a full professor at the University of Nottingham, and then Head of their School of Pharmacy. With colleagues he established Nottingham's Laboratory of Biophysics and Surface Analysis (LBSA). He was subsequently appointed Nottingham's Pro-Vice-Chancellor (PVC) for Teaching and Learning and then PVC for Research.

He was awarded a DSc from the University of Nottingham in 2007. He served as the Deputy Vice-Chancellor and Provost of the University of York from 2015-2023. From 2018 to 2019, he was the Acting Vice-Chancellor at York; he holds the title of Emeritus Deputy Vice-Chancellor and Provost at the University of York.

== External activities ==
He has been a member of a number of national and international bodies including: UK Healthcare Education Advisory Committee (2013–19), Non-Executive Director of Nottinghamshire Healthcare NHS Trust (2010–15), HEFCE/UUK/GuildHE Quality in Higher Education Group (2010–13), HEFCE Strategic Committee for Research (2003–08), Director of BioCity Nottingham Ltd, (2006-2012). He was the Chair of York Science Park Ltd from 2017-2023. He is currently the Chair of the Trustees of the Ashinaga Association in the UK.
