= University of Manchester Institute of Science and Technology =

Former university in Manchester, England

University of Manchester Institute of Science and Technology (UMIST)
- Coat of arms
- Former names: Manchester Mechanics' Institute; Manchester Municipal School of Technology; Manchester College of Science and Technology
- Motto: Latin: Scientia et Labore
- Motto in English: By Knowledge and Work
- Active: 1824–2004 (merged into newly formed University of Manchester in 2004)
- Affiliations: 1994 Group
- Administrative staff: 1,500 (2003)
- Students: 6,500 (2002)
- Undergraduates: 4,800 (2002)
- Postgraduates: 1,700 (2002)
- Location: Manchester, England, UK
- Campus: Urban
Scarf
- Colours

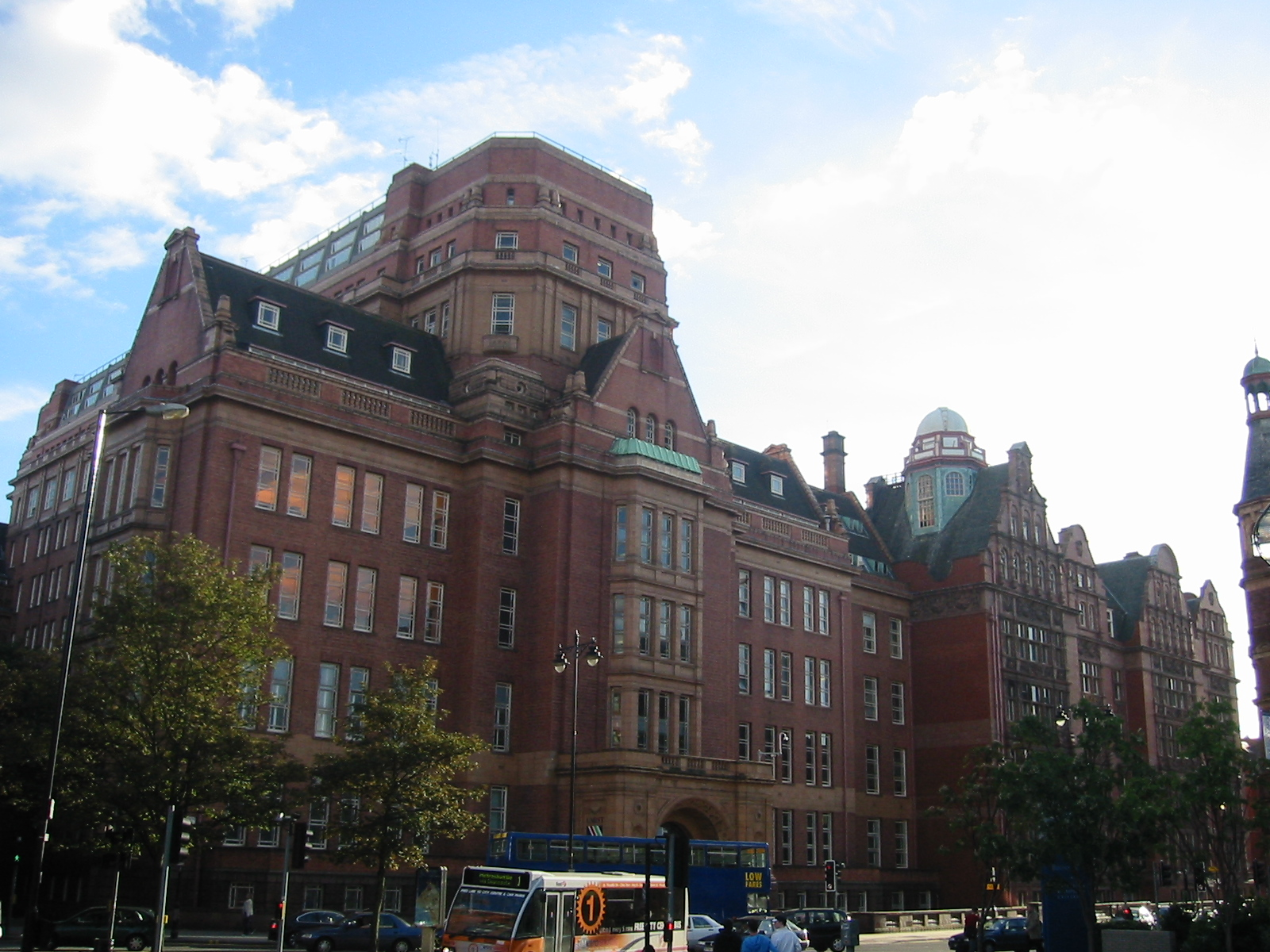
Sackville Street Building (formerly UMIST Main Building) from Aytoun Street / Whitworth Street

The University of Manchester Institute of Science and Technology (UMIST) was a university based in the centre of the city of Manchester in England. It specialised in technical and scientific subjects and was a major centre for research. On 1 October 2004, it amalgamated with the Victoria University of Manchester (commonly called the University of Manchester) to produce a new entity called the University of Manchester.

UMIST gained its royal charter in 1956 and became a fully autonomous university in 1994. Previously its degrees were awarded by the Victoria University of Manchester. The UMIST motto was Scientia et Labore (By Knowledge and Work).

== History ==
=== Manchester Mechanics' Institute (1824–1882) ===
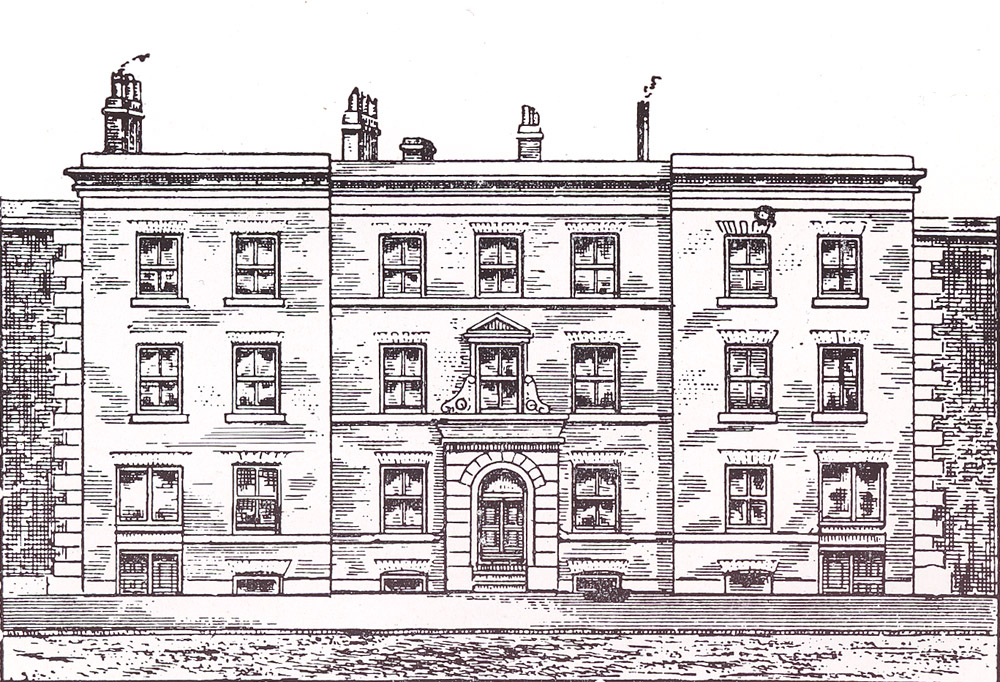
Manchester Mechanics' Institute, Cooper Street in 1825

The foundation of UMIST can be traced to 1824 during the Industrial Revolution when a group of Manchester businessmen and industrialists met in a public house, the Bridgewater Arms, to establish the Mechanics' Institute in Manchester, where artisans could learn basic science, particularly mechanics and chemistry. Hundreds of such institutions were founded in towns and cities throughout the country and while many of the fine Victorian buildings built to house them remain, Manchester's alone survived as an independent institution serving some of its original educational aims throughout the 20th century.

The meeting, convened by George William Wood on 7 April 1824, was attended by prominent members of the science and engineering community, including:

- John Dalton, who became known as the "father of atomic theory" and was vice-president of the institute from 1839 to 1841
- Robert Hyde Greg, a cotton mill owner who was soon to be elected a member of parliament
- Peter Ewart, a millwright and engineer
- Richard Roberts a machine tools inventor
- David Bellhouse, a builder
- William Henry, a pioneer in the scientific chemical industry, discovered Henry's law of solubility of gas in water
- William Fairbairn, a Scottish engineer associated with water wheels and the Britannia tubular bridge but above all with a scientific approach to engineering. He was elected first secretary of the Mechanics' Institute
- Sir Benjamin Heywood, a prosperous banker, acted as president of the Mechanics' Institute from 1824 to 1841; his son, Oliver subsequently became president.

A committee was elected to realise the planned institution, including Wood, Fairbairn, Heywood, Roberts and John Davies and the institute opened in 1825 with Heywood as chairman.

However, the institute's intentions were paternal and no democratic control by its students was intended. In 1829, radical Rowland Detrosier led a breakaway group to form the New Mechanics' Institution in Poole Street, a move that had a serious effect on the recruitment and finances of the original institute. Subscriptions and memberships in 1830 and 1831 were an all-time low and only the gradual opening of the board up to election by the members rectified the situation. Detrosier's break away ultimately rejoined the institute.

By 1840, the institute was established with 1,000 subscribers and a library of some 5,500 books. However, the increased popularity had been somewhat at the cost of science education as more and more lectures on non-scientific subjects were occupying its programmes.

The institute occupied a building on Cooper Street (near the present St Peter's Square) and later moved to its present site on David Street (later renamed Princess Street). This still stands and is a Grade II* listed building.

=== The Tech (1883–1905) ===
In 1883 secretary of the institution John Henry Reynolds reorganised the institution as a technical school using the schemes and examinations of the City and Guilds of London Institute. A new building was begun in 1895 and opened by the Prime Minister Arthur Balfour in October 1902. On the site previously had been cheap crowded inner-city housing occupied by Irish immigrants.

This is the western end of the Sackville Street Building, until 2005 known as the UMIST Main Building, pictured above, a Grade II listed building by Spalding and Cross with Renaissance motifs of Burmantofts terracotta. By this time the institution was called the Manchester Municipal School of Technology or fondly known as the Tech. As a project of the Manchester City Council it includes in the decoration many portrayals of the city's coat of arms.

As befits its roots in the early chemical industry of the region The Tech had pioneered chemical engineering as an academic subject in Britain, indeed the lectures by George E. Davis in 1888 were highly influential in defining the discipline. Similarly in the 1920s it pioneered academic training in management, with the formation of a Department of Industrial Administration funded by an endowment from asbestos magnate Sir Samuel Turner.

=== Association with Victoria University of Manchester (1905–1994) ===
In 1905, the Tech become the Faculty of Technology of the Victoria University of Manchester, allowing the award of BSc and MSc degrees. The principal of the School of Technology was now also dean of the faculty and an ex officio member of the university's senate.

In 1918, the institution changed name again to Manchester Municipal College of Technology. By 1949 over 8500 students were enrolled, however most still studying non-degree courses. The appointment of B. V. Bowden (later Lord Bowden) in 1953 marked the beginning of a phase of expansion.

On 29 July 1955 the institute received its own royal charter incorporating it as a university college under the name Manchester College of Science and Technology, and became separately funded by the University Grants Committee. The process of independence from the city was completed on 1 August 1956 when the Manchester Corporation transferred the assets of the Manchester Municipal College of Technology to the new college, with the principal of the municipal college becoming the first principal of the university college on the same day.

The UMIST emblem as used in the late 20th century (based on the arms of the institute, derived from the coat of arms of the lords of the manor of Manchester)

By 1966 all non-degree courses were moved to the Manchester School of Design which is now part of Manchester Metropolitan University, and in 1966 the name finally changed to the University of Manchester Institute of Science and Technology on the initiative of Acting Principal Frank Morton. UMIST and the Victoria University of Manchester retained close ties for the second half of the 20th century, with UMIST students being awarded, or having the choice of, a University of Manchester degree until full autonomy.

Until this time UMIST was the Faculty of Technology of the Victoria University of Manchester, an interesting situation because the University of Manchester also had its own science and engineering courses. Although academically part of the university, UMIST was financially and administratively independent.

Congregation ceremonies were held at the University of Manchester on Oxford Road, but in 1991 the first congregation ceremony was held in the Great Hall at UMIST itself in the Sackville Street Building.

UMIST students were entitled to use the facilities of the Victoria University, including the John Rylands University Library at the Oxford Road site and sports facilities and social clubs organised by the students' unions. In fact, first year UMIST undergraduates were often placed into Manchester University halls of residence and vice versa.

=== Independent university (1994–2004) ===
In 1994 UMIST finally achieved the status of an independent university with its own degree-awarding powers with the principal, Harold Hankins, becoming the principal and vice-chancellor.

During the last quarter of the 20th century UMIST established a reputation as a major research-based university, performing well in the government's Research Assessment Exercise in 2001, and was well placed in various league tables. UMIST has won four Queen's Prizes for Higher and Further Education, two Prince of Wales' Awards for Innovation and two Queen's Award for Export Achievement.

UMIST was instrumental in the founding of what is now the Museum of Science and Industry in Manchester. Famous alumni include Nobel Laureate in nuclear physics Sir John Cockcroft, aeroplane pioneer Sir Arthur Whitten Brown, and designer of the Lancaster bomber Roy Chadwick, while famous academics include mathematicians Louis Joel Mordell, Hanna Neumann, Lewis Fry Richardson and Robin Bullough, and the physicist Henry Lipson.

Other notable alumni include Margaret Beckett, a politician who in 2006 became Foreign Secretary.

The later 20th century saw UMIST diminishing its formal connections with Manchester University. In 1994 most of the remaining institutional ties with the Victoria University of Manchester were severed, as new legislation allowed UMIST to become a fully autonomous university with powers to award its own degrees.

=== Merger into the University of Manchester (since 2004) ===
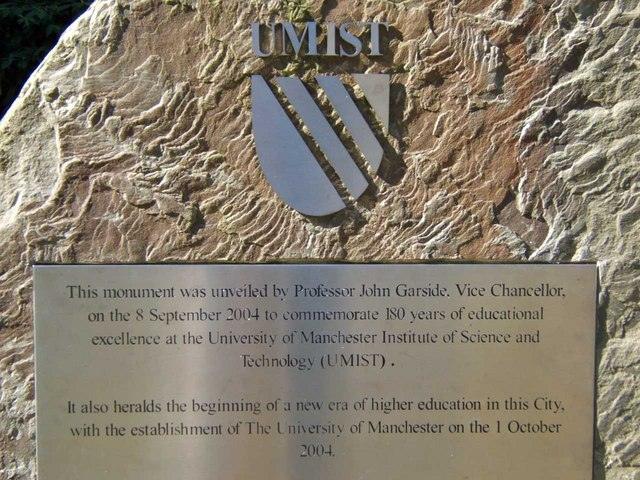
The 2004 plaque "commemorating 180 years of educational excellence"

UMIST, together with the Victoria University of Manchester ceased to exist on 1 October 2004, when they were combined in a new single University of Manchester. Terry Leahy, CEO of Tesco and alumnus was the last Chancellor of UMIST, and the Vice-Chancellor was a chemical engineer, John Garside.

After the merger with Victoria University of Manchester the UMIST Main Building was renamed as the Sackville Street Building.

The merged university undertook a massive expansion and a £350 million capital investment programme in new buildings. Some, such as the Alan Turing Building, house merged departments such as the School of Mathematics. The estates plan, published in 2007, indicates an intention to sell a number of former UMIST teaching buildings, including the Moffat Building, the Maths and Social Sciences Tower, the Morton Building and the Fairbairn Building, as well as formerly UMIST-owned halls of residence including Hardy Farm, Chandos Hall, Wright-Robinson Hall and Weston Hall. The original UMIST Main Building is not included in this list. Covenants restrict it to educational use. No plans have been announced for the sale of any former Victoria University of Manchester buildings. Unions and some ex-UMIST staff and students have reacted angrily to the potential sales.

In the estates strategy for 2010–2020 for the University of Manchester it is stated that essentially all of the former UMIST campus, described as the "area north of the Mancunian Way", is to be disposed of. Only the Manchester Institute of Biotechnology, which was built in 2006, is exempted, whilst the fate of the former UMIST Main Building is left vague. The Faraday Building will be replaced by student accommodation and it is envisaged that the Engineering Schools will eventually be relocated to new buildings on the site of the present halls of residence in the Grosvenor Place area. This plan will, therefore, encompass the destruction of almost all of UMIST's physical legacy.

In March 2007, the press claimed that the merger had created a debt of £30 million, about 5% of the university's annual turnover, and that the university was aiming to tackle this debt by implementing 400 voluntary redundancies. The University and College Union accused the university of mismanagement and called for a halt to recruitment. Critics use these statistics to support the claim that it was not a merger of equals, that it was effectively a takeover of UMIST by Manchester University and that this was not in UMIST's best interests.

== Student life ==
In the late 20th century, student life at UMIST centred on the Barnes Wallis Building, which was the home of the Students' Union (later known as the Students' Association), the main refectory and Harry's Bar. The main redbrick building contained a student self-service café, known as the Readers' Digest.

A prominent feature of the student calendar from the 1960s onwards was the Bogle Stroll. This was a 55-mile-long (89 km) sponsored walk for charity which was held annually during Rag Week. Each year, hundreds of students followed the circular route which started and finished at the UMIST campus. The tradition continues at the University of Manchester.

Sports facilities included a gymnasium in the main building, the large assembly hall, the MUTECH playing fields and the Sugden Sports Centre (jointly owned by UMIST and the Metropolitan University and opened in 1998). The director of sport administered the facilities, recreation classes and inter-departmental competitions. The athletic union was responsible for administering the grant-aided clubs and inter-varsity teams.

== Alumni groups ==
Until the late 1980s, UMIST's official alumni organisation was called the Manchester Technology Association, a name which was a relic of UMIST's past incarnation as 'The Tech'. The organisation's name was then updated to become the UMIST Association. It published a glossy magazine for UMIST graduates called Mainstream.

In 2004, at the time of the university merger, the UMIST Association also merged with its equivalent organisation at the Victoria University of Manchester. This step was taken after minimal consultation with its membership. From that point on, there was no official association specifically for past UMIST students or staff. However, the growth of social networking websites has allowed the development of a number of unofficial UMIST alumni groups in cyberspace, particularly on Facebook. The UMIST alumni group on LinkedIn has over 6,500 members and has a sub-group for each of UMIST's academic departments.

== UMIST Campus ==
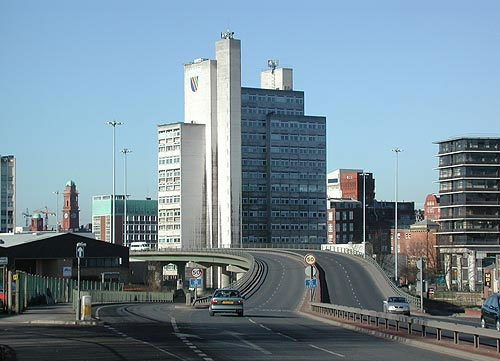
UMIST's Mathematics and Social Sciences building seen from the Mancunian Way with original UMIST logo

UMIST moved to its present location just south of Manchester city centre at the end of the 19th century. The Main Building (now called the Sackville Street Building) was purpose-built between 1895 and 1902 by Spalding and Cross. Starting in 1927, plans were drawn up by the architects Bradshaw Gass & Hope for an extension which would approximately double the size of the original building. However, construction was delayed by the war and other factors, so that the extension was not fully completed until 1957. The latter firm were also responsible for internal alterations which enlarged and upgraded the library so that it extended over more floors and some of the academic departments were relocated (1986-1987). Upon completion it was given the name of Joule Library.

In the 1960s the institution expanded rapidly to the south, growing from a single large building to an entire campus. Around a dozen modern buildings were constructed on the other side of the railway viaduct from the Main Building. The new edifices were designed by leading Manchester architects and were all built out of concrete. They included the George Begg Building (Mechanical Engineering), the Maths and Social Sciences Tower, the Faraday Building, the Renold Building, and the Barnes Wallis Building, the last two of which faced each other across a bowling green, which later became a landscaped garden.

- Three small apple trees, said to have been grown from cuttings taken from the apple trees in Sir Isaac Newton's garden, are planted by the archway containing a statue of Archimedes in his bath by Thompson Dagnall.
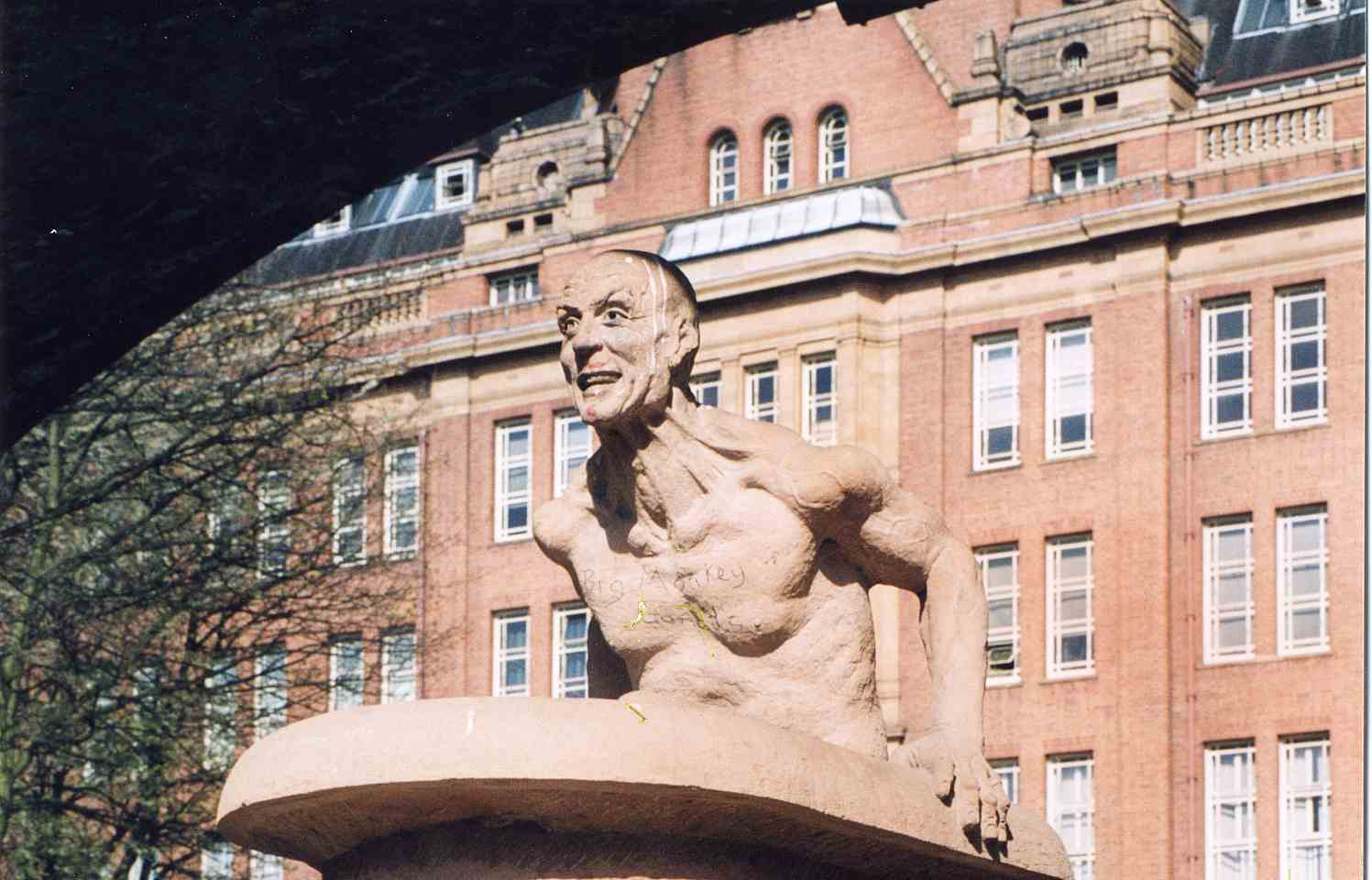
  Archimedes Statue
- The popular fruit cordial Vimto was formulated in a shed located in the space that UMIST eventually came to cover – around 1991–92 students and others were asked to give their opinions and perhaps vote on a memorial to this invention – the winner was a huge wooden carving of a Vimto bottle surrounded by representations of fruit, the juices of which are used in the product.
- UMIST is on land which used to be home to a large number of dyers' factories by the River Medlock, which now runs through underground culverts beneath the site.
  UMIST in 1942 showing the factories on land which later became part of the campus.
  An original bend in the river can be traced by observing the angles of two of the arches of the railway viaduct alongside UMIST. These were built slanted to accommodate the winding river.

== See also ==
- Armorial of UK universities
- Category:People associated with the University of Manchester Institute of Science and Technology
- UMIST linear system
