= Harold Hankins =

British electrical engineer

Harold Hankins CBE FREng (18 October 1930 – 2 May 2009) was a British electrical engineer and the first Vice-Chancellor of UMIST.

== Early life and education ==
Hankins was born 18 October 1930 in Crewe, Cheshire and at the age of 16 began an apprenticeship with the London Midland and Scottish Railway. He continued to study with evening classes at Manchester Municipal College of Technology, gaining a first class honours degree in 1955.

== Career ==
In 1955 he joined Metropolitan-Vickers rising to the position of assistant chief engineer, doing research into communication systems. The company changed into AEI and he led a team developing communication systems for rockets including Blue Streak.

In 1968 he joined UMIST as a lecturer, completing a PhD by part-time study and becoming Professor of Communication Engineering in 1974 and Head of Department of Electrical Engineering and Electronics in 1977.

In 1979 he became Vice-Principal of UMIST, Acting Principal in 1982 and Principal in 1984. At this time UMIST was technically a faculty of the Victoria University of Manchester which awarded the degrees. In 1992 UMIST became a separate university in its own right, and Hankins was its first Vice-Chancellor until his retirement in 1995. He is commemorated in the Harold Hankins Building housing the Manchester Institute of Innovation Research.

In 1993 he was elected a Fellow of the Royal Academy of Engineering and in 1996 he was appointed a CBE for "services to education".

== Personal life ==
In 1955 he married Kathleen Higginbottom: they had three sons. He died in Glossop, Derbyshire on 2 May 2009.
