= Language education in the United Kingdom =

Teaching of modern languages in the UK

The teaching of modern languages in the United Kingdom occurs mainly from ages 7 to 16 in primary schools and secondary schools.

== History ==
=== 1900s ===
Linguaphone (company) was founded in 1901, becoming a significant company by the 1970s, with Berlitz of the US, which was founded in 1878, but Berlitz largely teaches English.

In 1907 Donald Mackay, 11th Lord Reay was appointed to the Treasury Committee on the Organisation of Oriental Studies in London, and produced a report in 1909; he had worked with the Royal Asiatic Society of Great Britain and Ireland in the 1890s.

=== 1910s ===
Stanley Mordaunt Leathes (1861–1938) was appointed in 1916 to set up the Leathes Committee, which found in the Report on the Position of Modern Languages in the Educational System of Great Britain, in 1918 that European languages should be taught.

=== 1920s ===
In January 1926 the National Union of Women Teachers proposed teaching foreign languages in primary schools.

=== 1940s ===
The British government provided no official language training for its diplomats until January 1943, under a White Paper proposal by Anthony Eden when the Foreign Office and Diplomatic Service, the Commercial Diplomatic Service and the Consular Service were merged. In 1944 the Foreign Office Russian Studies Committee produced a report on the teaching of Russian

=== 1950s ===
After the Second World War, there was a much greater impetus for learning spoken foreign languages, such as German. Germany was subdivided into British and American sectors. Previous to the Second World War, the spoken language was not that urgently required. This grammar–translation method would persist until the 1960s.

At a North of England education conference in December 1959, Dr A Hay, the chief education inspector of London County Council, proposed some primary school language tuition, but only for gifted children.

=== 1960s ===
Until the 1960s foreign language education was mostly confined to grammar and independent schools. There were government plans for language teaching in primary schools, but the plans were dropped, due to the obvious situation of insufficiently trained teachers.

Secondary modern schools had limited modern language teaching, being occasionally found in the top stream of such schools, but often there was none at all.

On 22 February 1962 Conservative MP John Cordeaux asked the education secretary about foreign language teaching in primary schools. The government was to implement an experimental scheme to attempt French teaching in some primary schools, in nine areas across England and Wales, from September 1964, in conjunction with the Nuffield Foundation. By 1968, 850 Scottish primary schools taught French, with 200 out of Glasgow's 212 primary schools.

The Schools Council was founded in October 1964, which looked at the curriculum.

=== 1970s ===
Following the introduction of comprehensive education in the 1960s the provision of language education at secondary level, mostly French, expanded and many primary schools introduced foreign languages as part of the 'Primary School Language Project' in the early 1970s. However, by the 1970s the status of French in primary schools was in question with the influential report 'Primary French in the Balance' ensuring that 11 was the age that most began studying French. Primary French teaching mostly finished in 1974, after reports by Clare Burstall published on December 9, 1970, and in December 1974. But Tameside, Kent and East Sussex continued some teaching, with East Sussex finishing by 1997.

The National Council for Modern Languages was founded in June 1972 for FE and HE teachers.

From 1970 to 1975 French A-level entries dropped from 25,925 to 17,025 and German entries from 7,520 to 5,516. The move to comprehensive schools had not been seen to help language teaching to flourish, so a national survey of language teaching was conducted by five HM Inspectors of Schools in 83 comprehensive schools took place from 1975 to 1976, which resulted in the ungenerous DES report Modern Languages in Comprehensive Schools published on Thursday 17 March 1977. The report said that language teaching was often too 'mechanical' and inflexible, not nuanced.

The DES report said that mixed ability language classes were not a resounding success, that 'there was grave cause for concern' about bright children trying to learn languages at comprehensive schools, and that not enough was being done to help them. Teaching in sixth forms was 'no less disquieting'. Comprehensive schools had introduced language teaching, nominally for all, at some comprehensive schools, although most comprehensive schools only offered such language teaching to the top 60-80%, at most. Only a minority at such schools continued languages after 14.

Due to more language teachers being required, it became more difficult for comprehensive schools to offer two languages for those taking languages after 14. Under the former grammar school system, taking two languages up to 16 was never any profound difficulty; the grammar schools had enough teachers, and enough people capable of learning two languages. Comprehensive schools often had neither. The 1977 report also questioned why only people who took French A-level were able to continue French to 18, when there were many other people at 16 who had some capability in languages. Other European countries did not do this. Many former grammar school teachers found language teaching across wide abilities in comprehensive schools difficult. It found, over the 83 secondary schools, that there was one pass in a language O-level, or CSE grade 1, at 16, for every ten children at 16.

In the 1977 report, it found that many heads of language departments 'showed little awareness of the responsibilities they bore, beyond the walls of their own classrooms', leading some less-experienced teachers to flounder on their own, when such teachers needed to be assisted.

The British Overseas Trade Board (BOTB) held a conference on 19 May 1978 at the Royal Society of Arts entitled 'Does Britain need linguists?', attended by Labour MP Les Huckfield.

In a BOTB report, 'Foreign Languages for Overseas Trade', published on Wednesday 23 May 1979, with a foreword by the Duke of Kent, it found that secondary school language abilities were not appropriate for the world of work. In his foreword, the Duke made several accusations, claiming that British companies had not tried with other languages, due to relying on Commonwealth connections, and that it was expensive to give language training to managers. The Duke claimed that secondary schools were obsessed far too much with syntax and grammar, and that secondary schools should have acquired the spoken diction beforehand. The BOTB report was later discussed at a conference for headteachers, hosted by the University of Surrey's Department of Linguistic and International Studies, on 8 December 1979.

In December 1979 the University Grants Committee published its 'Report on Russian and Russian Studies in British Universities', which proposed to end the teaching of Russian in 19 to 20 universities; this was to centralise teaching in 20 main university departments. This move was opposed by the British Association for Slavonic & East European Studies

=== 1980s ===
In 1983, the most French A-levels were taken: 27,103. The number fell but increased again by the early 1990s.

Universities were beginning to offer European business courses, to allow a year out in Europe, often at polytechnics, such as Middlesex Polytechnic. The University of Kent was a leading university with such courses, and cooperation with European universities. It largely coordinated all of the UK's part in the Erasmus Programme.

Many more secondary schools were offering languages up to 14, but not many comprehensive schools had obligatory language teaching after that. Most grammar schools would require a language to be followed up to 16. Prior to the 1970s, languages were largely only taught in grammar schools after the age of 14, and to take two languages up to 16. Most people believed that comprehensive schools could not achieve this, given the large range of abilities; only a few people, at most, believed it could be taught up to 16 in comprehensive schools. Some chief education officers believed that language teaching should be compulsory up to 16, for the able children only.

In 1987, the report Curriculum Matters 8 - Modern foreign languages to 16 was published. The report found that 40% of people at secondary schools took a foreign language to 16. The report was quite general, and rarely mentioned individual foreign languages. The report did not greatly mention the glaring lack of language teachers.

As part of the National Curriculum, a Modern Languages working group was established in 1989.

The National Curriculum MFL Working Group (MFLWG) was chaired by Sir Martin Harris. The committee, possibly hardheadedly, believed that most children could study modern languages up to the age of 16, despite many other linguists, previously, not coming to that same radical, or optimistic, conclusion.

The Council of Europe, from 1982 to 1987, had been looking at language teaching across Europe, which influenced the findings of the committee of Sir Martin Harris. A national educational conference, to discuss any findings, was held in 1989.

As a result, all children at Key Stage 3 and Key Stage 4 were required to study a modern foreign language. However, concerns were expressed as to whether the time devoted to learning modern languages was sufficient for acquisition to take place and the extent to which French had become the dominant language.

Some areas of Scotland taught French in primary schools from 1989.

=== 1990s ===
On 16 May 1990, the BBC launched a £3m series of educational programmes to prepare for the Single Market in 1992, such as a series of ten programmes entitled You and 92.

In 1990 Betty Lockwood, Baroness Lockwood chaired a committee to look at language education in the UK: European Schools and Language Learning in UK Schools. It found that the UK was short of 1,750 teachers, and that the numbers of French A-levels had dropped 10% in eight years to 18,000.

The LINGUA programme was set up by the EC from 1990 to 1994, which changed to become the Socrates programme in 1994.

The 1990 House of Lords report 'European Schools and Language Learning in UK Schools' found that around 18,000 took French A-level, which had dropped by 10% in eight years.

The GCSE A* grade was introduced in 1994.

The 'Nuffield Languages Inquiry' was set up in 1998 by Sir John Boyd (diplomat), with Alwena Lamping.

=== 2000s ===
Curriculum 2000 was introduced by the Labour government in 2000 to allow an A-level course to be broken into two, in modules. It allowed A-levels to be less strenuous to attempt, and that more people could possibly pass each course. But, each exam required half the effort of the previous A-level system. An A-level became two AS-level courses. AS levels had been introduced, only, to give an alternative to the harder A-level course, which was not for everyone. But the AS-level had not been introduced to be a kind of replacement for the tough A-level exam. If teenagers took less-difficult exams at 18, the exam grades would inflate as well. The system was dropped from 2015 to 2018. The difficulty was that everyone was getting glowing exam grades, and so prestigious universities could not sufficiently separate out enough candidates; it was mere grade inflation.

The authoritative report Language Trends has been published annually since 2002 by the British Council.

In September 2000, modular AS levels were introduced, under Curriculum 2000. These were to be taken in year 12, which counted 50% towards the final A-level result: it spread the risk of the exam result over two years, but any number of resit exams were possible.

The European Year of Languages began in January 2001, and the Labour government had meetings with main European ambassadors about low participation in language education across the UK: Hans-Friedrich von Ploetz, Santiago de Mora-Figueroa y Williams and Daniel Bernard.

Lid King, the former director of the CILT from 1992, after John Trim and Alan Moy, became the new National Director for Languages in 2003, until 2012. He implemented the 2002 National Language Strategy.

In 2004 the Labour government dropped the requirement of the 1988 National Curriculum to take a language GCSE at 16. The Labour Party had recognised, after the age of 14, the adversity of many comprehensive schools trying to teach foreign languages; the subject could be too difficult for those who would not enter the sixth form. Language GCSEs were difficult to pass; dropping the requirement would also enable less-difficult GCSEs to be taken instead, giving an artificial boost to GCSE league tables. The NUT did not support the policy of dropping the requirement.

From 1996 French A-level entries had halved, to 14,650 in 2006, and there were 6,204 German A-level entries. By 2007, 51% at 16 took a language GCSE: in 2000 it was 80%.

=== 2010s ===
Foreign language teaching in primary schools was to be compulsory by September 2011. In 2001, 21% of primary offered foreign languages: by 2010 this was 92%.

Since 2014 the National Curriculum has required that pupils in Key Stage 2 must study an ancient or modern foreign language. Pupils in Key Stage 3 must study a modern foreign language.

From September 2016, in England, AS levels no longer counted towards the A-level; many took AS level language courses up to year 12 only; the new A-levels are called linear A-levels.

By 2017, there were 9,672 entries for French A-level, and 3,842 for German. But the regulator Ofqual found that one in five entrants for German A-level were native speakers, acquiring half of all A* grades, and a quarter of all A grades; possibly abusing or gaming the system.

In 2017, a survey by the CBI found that employers most need people with skills and fluency in French, German and Spanish.

In 2018, new modern language GCSEs were introduced in England and Wales. In January 2019, the National Centre for Excellence for Language was established at the University of York, to coordinate modern language education in England, with nine school hubs across England; of the nine schools, two are grammar schools and two are faith schools.

Between 2004 and 2024, the overall number of GCSEs sat in a language dropped by a third. From 2010 to 2018, French GCSE entries declined by 29% and German GCSE entries dropped by 37%. But Spanish GCSE entries from 2010 to 2018 rose considerably.

From 2011 to 2018, French A-level entries have dropped from around 12,000 to just under 8,000. According to Joint Council for Qualifications, language GCSE entries have halved since 2005. There was a slight increase in French GCSE entries in 2018 and 2019; entries for Spanish are on course to overtake entries for French by 2030.

=== 2020s ===
Ancient languages are being reintroduced into more English secondary schools, such as Latin. A £4m Department for Education scheme will initially be rolled out across 40 schools as part of a four-year pilot programme for 11- to 16-year-olds starting in September 2022. As well as language teaching, the Latin Excellence Programme will also include visits to Roman heritage sites to provide pupils with a greater understanding of classics and the ancient world. The initiative aims to boost GCSE Latin entries and will be modelled on the success of the Mandarin Excellence Programme, launched in 2016 in response to the growing importance of Mandarin as a global language. The programme now involves 75 schools across the country with more than 6,000 pupils learning Mandarin towards fluency.

With the passage of the British Sign Language (Scotland) Act 2015, the Scottish Qualifications Authority published a Group Award specification for BSL qualifications in 2021. With the passage of the British Sign Language Act 2022, the UK government published subject subject content for a BSL GCSE in 2024.

In 2022, Education Wales announced that BSL had become part of the Curriculum for Wales. In 2024, Qualifications Wales announced that the BSL qualification had been delayed from 2026 to 2027.

== National resources ==
- National Consortium for Languages Education; in March 2023, UCL was given a £15m contract to found the National Centre for Languages Education, with around 20 language hub schools
- Northern Ireland Centre for Information on Language Teaching and Research (NICILT) is at QUB
- Scotland has the SCILT at The Ramshorn, part of the University of Strathclyde
- Wales had the CILT Cymru, until funding was cut by 70% in 2014 from £600,000 to £200,000

=== Universities ===
- The Subject Centre for Languages Linguistics and Area Studies was at the University of Southampton, led by Michael Kelly, known as LLAS.
- Association of University Professors and Heads of French
- Confederation of University Teachers of German
- Standing Conference of Heads of Modern Languages in Universities
- University Council of Modern Languages, which runs Routes into Languages

== Nations ==
=== England ===
Language education in England up to the age of 19 is provided in the National Curriculum by the Department for Education, which was established in 2010.

Language teaching should provide the foundation for learning further languages, equipping pupils to study and work in other countries.

In the 2023 Language Trends, it was found that two in three state secondary schools in England teach only one foreign language at GCSE. Most grammar schools would teach at least two languages. For years 7 to 9, around half of those at independent schools learn two languages; for state secondary schools it was one in five. 38% of state secondary schools offer German at GCSE; for independent schools, it is 80%.

=== Wales ===
Take up of foreign languages at GCSE in Wales dropped from 55% of the cohort in 1995 to 22% in 2012. And it was worse in less-wealthy parts of Wales - only 11% of the cohort in Blaenau Gwent took a foreign language GCSE. German is taught in a quarter of secondary schools.

Wales has the lowest participation rate in foreign languages in the UK. Two other parts of the UK have grammar schools, which have helped the provision of foreign language learning, at least up to 16. Academic-orientated sixth form colleges, as much as grammar schools, also provide adequate foreign language teaching. But Wales, with no grammar schools, does not have the same adequate provision for such teaching. Northern Ireland is entirely selective, and has not suffered the fate of Wales, in its foreign language teaching.

Jean Coussins, Baroness Coussins, a Cambridge graduate in Modern Languages who has worked with the Chartered Institute of Linguists, and who chaired the All-Party Parliamentary Group on Modern Languages, chaired a discussion in the House of Lords on Wednesday 12 March 2014 about substandard language teaching in Wales.

The language component of the Welsh Baccalaureate was removed around 2014.

In December 2019, the British Council described secondary school language teaching in Wales as plummeting. From 2002 to 2019, GCSE foreign language candidates in Wales had dropped by 60%; 39% of secondary schools had no-one taking foreign languages after 16. Difficult foreign languages were viewed by schools as unsuitable for the less-able.

British Council Wales produced its annual report 'Language Trends Wales'.

230 French A-levels were taken in 2023, 55 German A-levels, and 140 Spanish A-levels in Wales.

=== Scotland ===
At the same time as England, foreign languages became compulsory at primary schools in September 2014.

=== Northern Ireland ===
Northern Ireland has an exclusively-selective education system; modern languages are broadly well-taught at selective schools. Northern Ireland has 794 primary schools, 66 grammar schools and 126 non-grammar secondary schools.

Language Trends Northern Ireland is produced for British Council Northern Ireland by Ian Collen, head of the NCILT at QUB, a former French and German teacher, who runs the PGCE courses at QUB.

In 2000, 190 Northern Irish candidates sat German A-level; in 2022 it was 72.

== Primary level ==
Around 50% of primary teachers either have a degree or A-level in a language. About 70% of primary schools deliver languages in-house, often with a HLTA, a type of teaching assistant who is not QTS standard. Some primary schools work with local secondary schools or sixth form colleges for language training for primary teachers. Around 10% of primary schools have overseas visits, and about 10% participate in eTwinning or the Comenius programme (itself part of the Socrates programme) whereby the scheme involves teacher exchanges abroad. Another project is MEITS (Multilingualism: Empowering Individuals, Transforming Societies).

=== England ===
At Key Stage 2 it is compulsory to for primary schools to study ancient and modern languages. French is offered at around 75% of primary schools, with Spanish at about 25% and German at about 5%, with about 45 minutes per week of language learning per school.

== Secondary level ==
From 1988 to 1995, due to the National Curriculum inclusion of a modern language, GCSE passes at grade A-C steadily increased from 270,000 to 350,000 for French, from around 75,000 to 130,000 for German, from 19,000 to 40,000 for Spanish, and from 2,900 to 5,600 for Italian.

Both French and German GCSE entries peaked in 1996, with 353,000 entries and 136,000 entries. Spanish GCSE entries rose until 2002, with 57,000 entries.

=== England ===
At Key Stage 3 it is compulsory for secondary schools to study modern languages.

GCSE modern foreign languages and GCSE ancient languages are studied at Key Stage 4. Spanish, French, German, Arabic, Bengali, Mandarin, Greek, Gujarati, Modern Hebrew, Italian, Japanese, Latin, Punjabi, Persian, Polish, Portuguese, Russian, Turkish, and Urdu are studied.

The English Baccalaureate was introduced in 2011, which has modern and ancient language requirements. Languages at GCSE are much more popular at single sex secondary schools than for co-educational state secondary schools; many grammar schools are also single sex schools. Many language teachers are female; in some secondary schools all language teachers are female, supplying limited role models for some teenage males.

== Sixth-form level ==
Modern and classical languages are taught at A-level, with French being most popular (around 8,000) followed by German (around 3,000). It is perceived that top grades are difficult to get in language A-levels.

At A-level you can hope to have around 300 hours of contact time, in total in the language course. Combined with that from 11 to 16, it is a total of around 700 hours, when at school for instance, in French. But to become proficient in a language, you would largely require around five times that time, to reach most typical proficiencies.

From 1990 to 1995, A level passes at grade A-C were around 27,000 to 30,000 for French, around 10,500 for German, around 4,700 for Spanish, and around 850 for Italian. A level French entries peaked in 1992 with 31,261, staying around 28,000 for the mid-1990s, but plummeted after 1998, with 21,072 in 1999, and 15,614 in 2002. For most of the 1990s, German A-level entries stayed at around 10,500, but began to drop after 1999, reaching around 7,000 in 2002. Spanish A-level entries started at around 3,800 in 1990, reaching 5,782 in 1999, and were around 5,500 in the early 2000s.

=== England ===
Modular AS levels had been introduced to form 50% of the total A-level result from 2000, but this was stopped from 2016.

=== Scotland ===
Those taking a Higher Grade course in a modern language dropped from 16,000 in 1975, to 12,000 in 1985, to 8,000 in 1995.

== University level ==
Teaching of modern languages at university is well-represented by universities such as those in the Russell Group, but in other universities, such teaching is not represented.

Joint honours courses began in the 1970s, largely with the introduction of polytechnics. University courses became built of modules in the late 1980s and early 1990s, with Institution-Wide Languages Programmes (IWLP). During the 1990s it was quite popular for many other courses to include some language modules, with the result that more students were learning languages through that method, than individual honours courses. After the 1990s the IWLP methodology lost favour, mostly due to tightening of university department budgets.

Admissions to single honours courses peaked in 1992. Single language departments at universities became 'Schools of Modern Languages'. More and more language students since the 1990s now come from independent schools, and less and less from disadvantaged postcode areas.

=== University language centres ===
The £1.5m Hetherington Language Centre opened at the University of Glasgow in December 1985. The Alliance Manchester Business School taught French, German, Spanish, Italian and Japanese from the early 1990s.

University language centres in the UK and Ireland are represented by the Association of University Language Centres.

AULC is part of the Europe-wide CercleS, the Confédération Européenne des Centres de Langues de l’Enseignement Supérieur, or European Confederation of Language Centres in Higher Education, which was formed in 1991. CercleS produces the journal Language Learning in Higher Education (LLHE), published in May and October. The journal can be found internationally at ERIH PLUS, EBSCO Information Services and the Education Resources Information Center (ERIC), and in the UK at Sherpa/RoMEO.

David Bickerton, of the University of Plymouth, was Secretary General from 1994 to 2000, and Peter Howarth from 2014 to 2016. In September 2012 CercleS held its XII conference at the LSE in London. In September 2024 CercleS held its XVIII conference at Durham University, entitled 'Multilingualism & the Anglosphere', which was organised by the university's Centre for Foreign Language Study.

== Military ==
The Diplomatic Service Language Centre was next to Westminster tube station, being formed in 1968 but closed on 2 October 2007; it largely taught French, German and Spanish. Russian was taught on 10-12 month courses at the Army School of Languages at the Wilton Park Estate in Buckinghamshire, on a Royal Army Educational Corps site. Chinese was taught on a 40-week course, over two years, at the University of Cambridge. Hungarian was taught over two terms at the UCL School of Slavonic and East European Studies.

== Broadcasting ==
The School Broadcasting Council for the United Kingdom, set up in 1947, advised the BBC for much of the 1960s.

Educational broadcasting at the BBC was largely started, on the radio, by Mary Somerville (broadcasting executive), after J. C. Stobart. Only after September 1957 did the BBC have the money for school television programmes, or sufficient technical equipment. The Educational Foundation for Visual Aids, founded in 1948, had a catalogue of over 6,000 educational films for schools, mostly for filmstrip projectors, a staple of 1960s and 1970s language education.

Enid Love (1911–79) was head of the BBC schools TV broadcasts, when these began from 2pm on Tuesday September 24, 1957, with 'Living in the Commonwealth' about Canada, presented by Bernard Braden and produced by Peggie Broadhead, at Lime Grove; who later produced a BBC French education series in 1974. Associated-Rediffusion began their schools programme the day before.

Enid Love, a history teacher who attended The Royal Masonic School for Girls, and graduated from Bedford College, London, had been headmistress for five years, from 1944, of a girls' grammar school, and had planned the BBC's educational television from November 1955. Later she was the headmistress of Sydenham School from 1963 to 1968.

The BBC Schools Television Unit began on April 1, 1957. Only 350 schools, in England and Wales, would be given a television to watch such programmes. Programmes would be broadcast four days a week, for a half-hour, from 2pm, all being broadcast live in the studio. All the producers had been teachers. The programmes would be intentionally for 11-15 year olds, at secondary modern schools. One programme a week would cover science, along with 'Looking Around' (became 'Spotlight') and 'Life in the Commonwealth'. Enid Love wanted a programme for school leavers, and a literary series, where schools would be sent books. Kenneth Fawdry was the head of BBC school broadcasting from June 1959.

In the 1980s some of the more well-known BBC programmes were carried by PBS channels in the US, such as WNET.

The Independent Television Authority began language education broadcasting on Tuesday September 20, 1960, with Chez Dupré. The Head of Schools Programmes of Associated-Rediffusion was Miss Enid Love, who chose 12-minute programmes, not 25-minute, as the programme was for beginners; all ITV regions broadcast the series, except Granada.

In late January 1963, the ITA began a language education television series for adults, at 10am on Sunday, called Mesdames, Messieurs, written by Miss Mary Glasgow, made by ATV (Associated Television). Bernard Sendall, of the ITA, had overseen the introduction. This was the first adult education series from the ITA. The BBC had begun adult education on television in September 1962, with an engineering science course for technical colleges.

Educational series have included:

=== Television ===
- Chez les Dupré, ITV September 20, 1960, 50 episodes on Associated-Rediffusion, written by Gerald Lester, until 1962; it was elementary French
- French From France, ITV January 1961, Tuesdays at 11.30 am, written by Miss Mary Glasgow and made by ATV, made in Chantilly, Oise in northern France, for age 14; featured Alain Chauveau, Françoise Apesteguy, Rudi Palmer, Hubert Buthion, Roger Brécourt, Roger Pera, Geneviève Thénier, Fernand Guiot, Suzanne Paillette, Paul Bonifas, and Jean-Marc Isay
- Ici La France, ITV January 1961, Wednesdays at 11.30am, written by Miss Mary Glasgow and made by ATV, made in France for the sixth form; the programme was to be called 'French for Sixth Forms'
- La Jeunesse Francaise, BBC TV 7 May 1962 on Mondays at 11.30am, a 4-part series for sixth forms, presented by Henry Appia, produced by Colin Nears. Repeated in May 1963
- Mesdames, Messieurs, ITV January 1963, Sundays at 10.30am, 20 minutes, it would get 600,000 to 700,000 viewers, made by ATV; it was a drama series featuring Colette Lacoste and Jean Houbé, part of the ITV hour-long 'Sunday Session' adult education programme, later featuring Suzanne Hennion, Aline Bertrand, Walter Magnée, José Berlinka, Gilles Brissac, Louisette Rousseau, Alan Cousineau, Jacques Cey, John Serret, Malou Pantera, Philippe Darau, Annette Fernan, Jean-Pierre Kalfon, Hugues Wanner, Gaston Richer, Marcel Klémens, Jean Driant, Jan Rosol; repeated September 1963
- Parliamo Italiano! BBC TV 5 October 1963 on Saturdays at 12.30pm and Thursdays at 11pm, 30-part series for beginners, presented by Ariella Reggio, with Marla Landi and Sergio Gazzarrini, written by Toni Cerutti, directed by Maddalena Fagandini, produced by Peter Montagnon; also broadcast in 1963 in Ireland by RTÉ One, and repeated in October 1966 on BBC1 on Mondays at 11pm and BBC2 on Thursdays at 7.30pm
- Komm Mit!, BBC1 3 October 1964 on Saturdays at 12.30pm, and Thursdays at 11pm, 30-part series for beginners with Heidi Treutler and Dieter Geißler, introduced by Sabine Michael and Paul Hansard, featured the actor Jeremy Kemp, directed by Maddalena Fagandini, produced by Colin Nears; repeated in October 1967
- Les Trois Coups, ITV 26 September 1965, on Sundays at 12.30pm, 39-part series made by ATV, adult education French for people with O-level French, on all ITV regions except Ulster Television, the second stage to Mesdames, Messieurs; the book was published by the University of London Press
- Bonjour Françoise, BBC1 3 October 1965 on Sundays at 9.30am and Tuesdays at 11pm, 30-part series for beginners, with Malou Pantera as Françoise, André Maranne, and François Brincourt as Jean-Paul, and featured Lucinda Curtis, written by Michel Faure, directed by Maddalena Fagandini, produced by Ronald Smedley; repeated in October 1967 on Saturday mornings on BBC1 and Tuesday evenings on BBC2; it received 500,000 to 1m viewers
- Suivez La Piste!, BBC2 7 January 1966 on Fridays at 7.30pm, as part of 'Outlook for Friday', then repeated from 4 July 1966 on BBC1 on Thursdays at 11.20pm, a French refresher course, 25-part thriller serial, written by Emile de Harven, with technical help from Michel Blanc and Ormond Uren (who had been in the Hungarian section of SOE), who were both Linguistics lecturers at Birkbeck College, with consultants Denys Player and John Trim, presented by Gisèle Grimm, Gérard Buhr with Monique Messine, and Michel Forain, produced by Colin Nears
- La Chasse au Trésor, BBC1 29 April 1968 on Mondays at 2.30pm and Fridays at 9.30am, with Sylvia Declercq, Philippe Paulino, André Maranne, Yvonne Dany, and Claude Legros, featuring Xavier Renoult, Nicole Desailly, François Marthouret, Jean Tolzac, and Max Doria, 8-part series, filmed in France, for children aged ten, who had studied French for two years, written by Michel Faure, produced by Ronald Smedley; repeated in April 1969 and April 1970
- Si Dice Cosi, BBC1 5 January 1969 Sundays at 10am and Saturdays at 10am, 26-part Italian series for beginners, with Bianca Maria Corbella, Yole Marinelli, Luigi Basagaluppi, and Alberto Colzi; repeated in October 1970
- Repondez S'il Vous Plait, BBC1 5 October 1969 on Sundays at 9.30am, with Max Bellancourt, assisted by Jacques Faber, Monique Messine, Paulette Preney and Jan Rosol
- Wie bitte?, BBC1 5 October 1969 Sundays at 10am, and Saturdays at 10.30am, beginners German course, with Dorothea Neukirchen, and Werner Umberg, Gerard Heinz, Carl Jaffe, Wolf Frees, Hannah Norbert, Martina Mayne, Ernst Walder, George Mikell, Leslie Banks, Tom Kempinski, Irene Prador, and Hugo Panczak, written by Milo Sperber; repeated in October 1971. A book was written by Antony Peck, who also wrote the books to 'Kontakte' and 'Wegweiser'
- Zarabanda, BBC1 3 October 1971 Sundays, Spanish beginners, presented by Alison Skilbeck and Carlos Riera, with Juan-Ignacio Macia, Esperanza Alonso, Jacinta Castillejo, Sergio Mendizabal, and Rosa Barbany
- Avventura: Italian, BBC1 1 October 1972 at 10am, 25-part series for beginners, with Margherita Guzzinati, Yole Marinelli (wife of Brian Weske), Gigi Gatti, Leonardo Pieroni, Maurizio Gueli, and Serena Spaziani
- Tout Compris, BBC1 January 1973, for ages 12–14, designed by Edward Neather, produced by John Prescott-Thomas
- Reportage, 30 September 1973 BBC1 on Sundays at 10am and Saturdays at 10.30am, 20-part series, German with Michael Birkett, 2nd Baron Birkett, produced by David Hargreaves, directed by Barbara Derkow; repeated in October 1974, and September 1976
- Quatre Coins de la France, BBC1 Schools 23 April 1974 on Tuesdays at 11.30am and Mondays at 2.30pm, with Katya Ellis, Gilles Dattas, and Paulette Preney, produced by Peggie Broadhead
- Kontakte, BBC1 6 October 1974 on Sundays at 10am and on Wednesdays at 12pm, and a Radio 3 series, with Liane Rudolph, Petra Schroeder, Jurgen Andersen, and Lutz Liebelt, produced by Maddalena Fagandini; Maddalena also presented Deutsch direkt! in 1985
- Ensemble, BBC1 1 October 1975, 24 part French for beginners, with Elma Soiron, Elisabeth Macocco, André Maranne (possibly the most well-known French actor on British television, who appeared as Sergeant François Chevalier in six Pink Panther films), Henri Bon, Richard Guedj, Tania Sourseva, Jean Nehr, Yves Favier, Paulette Frantz and her husband Alain Janey, Jean Péméja, Annick Roux, Jacques Disses, Claude d'Yd, Alain Mergnat, Serge Berry, and Pierre Saintons, co-written by Antoine Tudal, directed by Terry Doyle, produced by Tony Roberts; it had a correspondence course provided by the National Extension College in Cambridge, and other material from the Language Centre at Brighton Polytechnic
- Conversazioni, BBC2 12 April 1977 on 7pm and on BBC1 on Sundays at 10pm, 10-part second stage Italian, presented by Denis Mack Smith; repeated in January 1979 and April 1980
- Treffpunkt: Deutschland, BBC1 Schools 26 April 1977 on Tuesdays at 2pm and Thursdays at 2.30pm, for second and third year German, about German life, narrated by Edward Neather, with theme music the 1971 House of the King by the Dutch group Focus (band), with Georgina Green and the actor Wolf Kahler (four years later he appeared as a main character in Raiders of the Lost Ark), produced by John Prescott-Thomas; repeated September 1977, September 1978, January 1980, January 1981, February 1982, May 1983, on BBC2 in November 1983, March 1984, and February 1985
- Encounter: Germany BBC1 Schools 27 April 1977 on Wednesdays at 11.30am and Fridays at 9.30pm, with Gary Watson and Wolf Kahler, produced by John Prescott Thomas; repeated September 1977, September 1978, January 1980, January 1981, February 1982, and May 1983, and BBC2 from November 1983, March 1984, September 1984, and January 1985
- Télé-Journal, BBC1 10 January 1978 on Tuesdays at 9am, a replay, via Eurovision, of a news bulletin, from the previous day, of Télévision Française 1 (TF1) or Antenne Deux (France 2 since 1992), with Chantal Cuer, later with Marianne Lawrence, produced by Terry Doyle
- Appuntamento in Italia, BBC1 April 1978, with Giancarlo Ciccone, Gigi Gatti, produced by John Prescott-Thomas
- Encounter: Italy BBC1 Schools 18 April 1978 on Wednesdays 11.30am and Fridays at 9.30pm, with Sean Barrett, produced by John Prescott Thomas; repeated January 1979, and April 1980, and on BBC2 in February 1984, January 1985, April 1985, September 1985, and January 1986
- ¡Digame!, BBC1 4 October 1978, Spanish (with Radio 4), presented by Isabel Soto, Miguel Peñaranda, and Carlos Riera, produced by Maddalena Fagandini
- Encounter: France BBC1 Schools 30 April 1979 on Mondays at 11am, and Tuesdays at 2pm, narrated by actor Gary Watson, with theme music House of the King by Focus, produced by John Prescott Thomas; repeated September 1979, September 1980, September 1981, and January 1983, and on BBC2 in September 1983, January 1984, January 1985, September 1985, and January 1986
- Rendez-vous: France, BBC1 2 May 1979 on Wednesdays at 11.30am, presented by Yves Aubert and Carolle Rousseau, produced by John Prescott-Thomas
- Realidades de España, BBC1 2 May 1979 schools, on Wednesdays at 12pm, five films about Spain, in Spanish, including about the poet Antonio Machado, and the Moors and Christians of Alcoy festival, who also celebrate St George; shown until June 1985
- Heute Direkt, BBC1 May 1979, with Corinna Schnabel, it showed untranslated news programmes, via Eurovision, from German-speaking countries, including the GDR; produced by Barbara Derkow, assisted by Werner Kastor
- Dès le début, BBC1 September 1979 schools, presented by Yves Aubert and Carolle Rousseau, produced by John Prescott-Thomas; last shown in February 1988
- Russian Language and People, BBC2 14 January 1980, a 20-part documentary series presented by Tanya and George Feifer, Edward Ochagavia and the Russian TV presenter Tatyana Vedeneyeva; it also featured Lyubov Sokolova and Zoya Isaeva, produced by Terry Doyle; repeated in October 1982, September 1984, and October 1988
- Descubra: España, BBC1 Schools May 1981, with Isabel Soto and Carlos Riera, produced by John Prescott-Thomas
- Encounter: Spain BBC1 Schools 11 May 1981 on Mondays at 11.30pm and Tuesdays at 2pm, with Gary Watson, produced by John Prescott Thomas; repeated November 1981, May 1982, September 1982, and May 1983, and on BBC2 in September 1983, January 1984, January 1985, September 1985, January 1986, September 1986, and September 1987
- Dicho y Hecho, BBC1 Schools November 1981, simple conversational Spanish, with Isabel Soto and Carlos Riera, produced by John Prescott-Thomas
- The French Programme or Action-Télé, 1982 on ITV, written with Max Bellancourt and Michael Buckby, produced by Tony Davenall, made by Thames Television
- Télé-Montage 18 January 1982 BBC2 on Mondays at 11.30pm, 8-part series with excerpts from French television networks, presented by Marianne Lawrence, produced by Susan Paton; repeated on BBC1 in April 1982 and April 1983, and on BBC2 in April 1984
- Alles klar, BBC1 Schools May 1982, simple conversational German, with Lutz Liebelt and Gina Kalla, produced by Susan Paton; shown until June 1986
- Buongiorno Italia!, BBC1 10 October 1982 on Sundays at 11am and on BBC2 on Saturdays at 6pm, introduction to Italian, 20-part series for beginners, presented by Lilly Lambert, produced by Maddalena Fagandini; repeated on BBC2 in September 1983, November 1984, and September 1985, and on BBC1 in October 1986
- Greek - Language and People, BBC2 15 October 1983, on Saturdays at 6pm, ten-part series, with Katia Dandoulaki and Chris Serle, produced by Terry Doyle; repeated on Sundays at 11am on BBC1 in January 1984
- Unter Uns: Deutsche Dialoge, BBC2 Schools March 1984 at 9am, directed by Susan Paton, produced by John Prescott-Thomas
- The German Collection BBC2 Schools 8 March 1984 on Wednesdays at 11am; repeated in February 1994, March 1995, and April 1996
- Prima! BBC2 9 June 1984 on Saturdays at 7.30pm, tourist German, 8-part series, with Petra Ulrich, James McKenna, Rosemary Frankau and Raymond Mason, written by Terry Hawkin, directed by Nicholas Metcalfe, produced by Tony Roberts; repeated on BBC1 in February 1985, and on BBC2 Schools in January 1986
- Excuse My French, BBC1 26 August 1984, French beginners, 5-part, on Sunday evenings at 6.30pm; repeated in November 1986 on BBC2
- Une année chez les Francais, BBC2 25 September 1984, A-level French, produced by Caroline Godley
- A Vous La France, BBC1 7 October 1984 on Sundays at 11am and Saturdays at 6pm on BBC, a fifteen-part series for beginners, with Carolle Rousseau, Patrick Simpson-Jones, Yves Aubert and Phyllis Roome on Radio 4, and Pierrick Picot and Jack Starr, directed by Mary Sprent; repeated in October 1987, September 1990 and September 1992
- Deutsch direkt! BBC1 24 September 1985 on BBC2 at 12.30pm on Tuesdays, then on Radio 5 in the early 1990s, began with Hanni Vanhaiden, a 20-part series, helped by John Trim (linguist), and Katrin Kohl, directed by Marion Allison, and produced by Maddalena Fagandini; repeated in September 1988
- Encounter: Austria BBC2 Schools 22 April 1986 on Tuesdays and Thursdays at 9.30am, produced by Susan Paton; repeated in September 1986, April 1987, September 1987, September 1988, and September 1989
- Treffpunkt: Österreich BBC2 23 April 1986 on Wednesdays at 1.30pm and Thursdays at 9.30am, produced by Susan Paton; repeated in November 1986, April 1987, November 1987, November 1988, and October 1989
- Mach's Gut! BBC2 Schools 7 November 1986 on Fridays at 9.30am, simple conversational German, five-part series, with Robert Rauch and Sylvia Rotter, produced by Caroline Godley; repeated in January 1987, April 1988, April 1989 and April 1990
- France-Francais, BBC2 4 March 1987 on Wednesdays at 1pm
- A-level German BBC2 Schools 27 April 1987 on Wednesdays at 12pm, 5-part series, with Klaus Romer, produced by Susan Paton; repeated in May 1987, April 1988, April 1989, May 1990, April 1991, and April 1992
- España Viva, BBC1 1 November 1987 on Sunday mornings and on BBC2 on Saturday teatime, fifteen programmes, presented by actress Yolanda Vázquez; later in 1988 she presented Telejournal with Carlos Riera on BBC2 on Tuesdays at 7.30pm; repeated in September 1990, January 1991, September 1991, and September 1992
- Quinze Minutes, BBC2 9 January 1989 on Mondays at 12pm and on Wednesdays at 10am, for children aged 11, presented by Nicholas Mead, produced by Caroline Godley; repeated September 1989, January 1991, September 1992, January 1993, September 1993, January 1995, and September 1995, and Quinze Minutes Plus from January 1997
- Diez Temas, BBC2 10 January 1989 on Tuesdays at 10am, produced by Susan Paton; repeated January 1990, February 1991, September 1991, January 1992, September 1992, January 1993, January 1994 and August 1996
- When in Italy, BBC2 6 April 1989 on Thursdays at 7.30pm, five-part series, with associated radio series, with Italian actress Mirella d'Angelo, produced by David Cordingley
- Lernexpress, BBC2 16 January 1990 on Tuesday mornings, part of Daytime on Two (the former BBC Schools from 1983 to 2010), two-year GCSE German course, with Sonja Zimmer (Rebecca Immanuel), produced by Susan Paton; repeated in September 1990, and September 1991
- Italianissimo, BBC1 1 November 1992 on Sundays at 11am, ten-part series presented by Anna Mazzotti
- Jeunes Francophones BBC2 10 January 1994 on Mondays at 12pm
- The French Experience, BBC1 2 October 1994, on Sundays at 10.30am, with Radio 4 series
- Spanish Globo, BBC2 18 September 1995 on Mondays at 1.30pm, Spanish for beginners ages 11–12
- Sueños World Spanish, BBC1 1 October 1995 on Sundays at 10.30am, 20-part series for beginners, with a series on Radio 4, presented by Colombian actor Ricardo Vélez and actress Perpe Caja
- Get By in Italian, BBC2 15 July 1996
- Deutsch Plus, BBC1 29 September 1996 at 11am on Sundays, a twenty-part series, with Radio 4 series; this was an educational soap opera set in the fictional German television station of 'Deutschland Plus' in Cologne, and the fictional magazine television show 'Prima plus'; it was filmed in Germany, and made with DW, narrated by Andrew Sachs, himself a native German speaker, written by Barbara Derkow-Disselbeck; the actors were Ivan Sertic, Lale Utsükarci, Peter Höschler, Konstanze Proebster, Christa Rockstroh, Daniel Werner, Carole Schmitt, Astrid Rempel; produced by Chris Lent and David Hargreaves, directed by Chris Johnston; language consultant was Lore Arthur
- Hallo aus Berlin, BBC2 Schools 19 September 1996 on Thursdays at 12pm, for ages 11–13
- Voces Espanolas, BBC2 Schools 14 January 1998 on Wednesdays at 9.30pm for ages 14–16
- Make German Your Business, parts 1 and 2, BBC2 17 March 1999; last shown in October 2007
- Get By in Portuguese, BBC2 23 June 1999 on Wednesdays at 4am
- Make Spanish Your Business, BBC2 29 November 1999; last shown in February 2008
- Make Italian Your Business BBC2 2 December 1999
- Telling Tales BBC2 19 January 2009, for ages 7–11, German, five minutes long, folk tales

=== Radio ===
- Wiedersehen in Deutschland, Home Service 3 February 1957 on Sundays at 12pm and Fridays at 9.30am, written by Arthur Shepherd, narrated by Ferdy Mayne, 20-part series
- Starting Spanish, Network Three 30 September 1957 on Mondays at 7.30pm, 20-part series with Roger Delgado (later The Master on Doctor Who), Angel Luna, Basil Jones, Vanessa Redgrave, and Elena Morton; produced by Raymond Escoffey; repeated in April 1959
- Starting German, Network Three 24 February 1958 on Mondays at 7pm, with Preston Lockwood as David, Janette Richer as Susan, Martin Miller as Hans, Ferdy Mayne (later appeared as a main German officer in the 1968 Where Eagles Dare), Paul Hansard, Michael Rittermann, Frederick Schrecker, songs by Walther Gruner
- Intermediate German, Home Service 15 January 1959 on Thursdays at 11.30am, from September 1963 at 10.30am on Fridays, from September 1966 on Mondays, from September 1968 on Tuesdays until March 1973, written by Hilde-Maria Kraus, and Milo Sperber
- Russian for Beginners, Network Three 2 November 1959 on Mondays at 7pm, and Sundays at 2pm, 40-part series, with Victor Gregoriy, and Lubow Volossevich, written by Ronald Hingley, produced by Raymond Escoffey; repeated in October 1960
- Italian for Beginners, Network Three 3 October 1960 on Mondays at 7pm, and Fridays at 6.30pm, 40-part series, presented by Luisa Rapaccini, with Ariella Reggio and Andrea Tacchi, produced by Elsie Ferguson; repeated in October 1961
- Keep Up Your Russian, Network Three 6 October 1960 on Thursdays at 6.30pm, 20-part series with Emmie Vosnesenskaya, Dimitri Obolensky, Alexis Bobrinskoy Alexander Tvardovsky, Konstantin Fedin and Victor Gregoriy, with the voices of Lyudmila Pavlichenko, Konstantin Beskov, Mikhail Semichastny, Boris Livanov, Vladimir Belokurov. Produced by Ariadne Nicolaeff, written by Dennis Ward of the University of Edinburgh. Repeated in October 1961
- Keep Up Your Italian, Network Three 9 October 1961 on Mondays at 7pm, and Fridays at 6.30pm, 20-part second-stage series, presented by Giuseppe Manighetti, with Ariella Reggio and Andrea Tacchi, produced by Elsie Ferguson
- Keep Up Your French, Network Three 1 March 1962 on Thursdays at 6.30pm, 20-part second stage series, presented by Paul Couster, written by Charlotte Crozet, produced by Elsie Ferguson; repeated in September 1963
- German for Beginners, Network Three 5 March 1962 on Mondays at 7pm, and Fridays at 6.30pm, with Sydney Salamé, Sabine Michael, Hannah Norbert, René Halkett, Gerda Koeppler, Renee Goddard, produced by Edith Baer; repeated in September 1963
- Starting Russian, Network Three 18 November 1962 on Sundays at 3.30pm and Tuesdays at 6.30pm, 40-part series, presented by Dennis Ward (1 February 1924 - 5 April 2008), Professor of Russian at the University of Edinburgh, with Antony Stokes, Victor Gregoriy, and Emilia Vosnesenskaya (1928–2015), Korney Chukovsky, Sir Dimitri Obolensky, written by Kyra Ericsson, produced by Ariadne Nicolaeff
- Use Your Italian, Network Three 10 January 1963 on Thursdays at 7pm, 20-part series, presented by Ariella Reggio, written by Pietro Giorgetti, produced by Elsie Ferguson; repeated October 1963
- Spanish for Beginners, Network Three 30 September 1963 on Mondays at 7pm and Fridays at 6.30pm, 40-part series, presented by Jacinta Castillejo, with Amelia Diaz, Pablo Soto, Antonio López and Fernando Agós, written by Anthony Watson, produced by Edith Baer, Henry Bentinck and George Walton Scott; repeated in October 1964 on the Home Service
- Starting French, Network Three 28 September 1964 on Mondays at 6.30pm and Fridays at 7pm, 40-part series, with Katia Ellis, assisted by Paul Couster, produced by Elsie Ferguson; repeated in October 1965 and on the Home Service
- Talking Italian, Network Three 29 September 1964 on Tuesdays at 6.30pm, and on the Home Service on Saturdays at 10.30am, 20-part second stage, with Pietro Giorgetti and Ariella Reggio, produced by Elsie Ferguson; repeated in October 1965
- Introduction to Russian, Network Three 7 October 1964 on Wednesdays at 6.30pm, and on the Home Service on Saturdays at 11am, 20-part series, with Dennis Ward and Konstantin Irinsky, produced by Tony Cash; repeated in March 1965
- Es Geht Weiter, Network Three 23 February 1965 on Tuesdays at 6.30pm, with repeats on Saturdays on the Home Service at 11am, a 20-part series for everyday German at an intermediate standard of knowledge, introduced by Sabine Michael and Dieter Geissler, with Heidi Treutler, Lilly Kann, Angelika Sahler, Rolf Richards, Carl Duering, Paul Hansard, Rudolf Offenbach, Irene Prador, Gerda Koeppler, Joseph Stein, René Halkett, Otto Diamant, Frederick Shrecker and Karen Glazer, written and produced by Edith Baer; repeated in October 1965
- additionally with later series Der Arme Millionär (The Poor Millionaire), a similar 20-part programme, with the same presenters, for intermediate German, from 1 March 1967, at the same weekly times, but with Renée Goddard, Michael Wolf, written in consultation with Ladislaus Löb of the University of Sussex, who had escaped to Switzerland on the Kastner train, towards the end of the war; repeated in March 1968 on Radio 3, with additional material from Three Men in the Snow (novel), and in May 1977, broadcast directly after Get By in German. A course book was published in 1967 ISBN 0563071184.
- Allons-y!, Home Service 28 September 1965 on Tuesdays at 10.30am, 32-part second-year French, written by Emile Harven; repeated in September 1966, September 1967, September 1968, and September 1969
- Toutes Directions, Network Three 28 February 1966 on Mondays at 6.30pm, and Thursdays at 7pm, 20-part second-stage series, with Katia Ellis and Emile Harven, written by Odile Castro, produced by Elsie Ferguson; repeated in December 1966
- Buntes Magazin, 16 June 1966 Network Three on Thursdays at 6.30pm, and Saturdays at 11.30am on the Home Service, ten-part German series, with Sabine Michael and Dieter Geissler, written by Edith Baer
- First Year Russian, Network Three 3 October 1966 on Fridays at 7pm, a 20-part beginner's class, in conjunction with the University of Essex, for evening classes, written by Terry Culhane, of the University of Essex, with Paddy O’Toole and Peter Mirsky, with Alexei Jawdokimov, Victor Gregoriy and Ina De La Haye, produced by Dennis Simmons, the series book was published on 1 January 1967; repeated on Radio 3 in October 1967
- Introduction to Chinese, Network Three 4 October 1966 on Tuesdays at 6.30pm, and on the Home Service on Saturdays at 10.30am, 10-part series, it was the first time that the BBC had taught Chinese, and it was an experiment, with Lucia Liu and Terry Chang, written by David Pollard and staff of SOAS University of London, produced by Elsie Ferguson; repeated in May 1967
- À L'Écoute, Home Service 29 September 1967 on Fridays at 9.30am, 20-part series for primary school, third year of French, written by Raymond Escoffey and Paule-Aline Dent; repeated on Radio 4 in September 1968
- Starting Spanish, Radio 3 4 October 1967 on Wednesdays at 6.30pm, and on Radio 4 on Saturdays at 10.30am, as part of 'Study Session', 40-part series, presented by Jacinta Castillejo (wife of Rafael Martínez Nadal and daughter of José Castillejo and Irene Claremont de Castillejo) with Pablo Soto, Fernando Agós, Antonio López, Pilar de Rubio, Cristina Roura, Isabel de Castro, written by Brian Dutton and Ángel García de Paredes, it had a 192-page book, produced by George Walton Scott; repeated on Radio 3 in October 1970, as part of Study on 3
- Speaking Chinese Radio 3 4 October 1967 on Wednesdays at 7pm, and on Radio 4 on Saturdays at 11.30am, a 15-part second-stage course, with Lucia Liu and Terry Chang, written by David Pollard, produced by Elsie Ferguson and Elizabeth Gusterson; repeated on Radio 4 in May 1968
- Frisch Begonnen Radio 4 23 September 1968 on Mondays at 9.20am, made with West German Radio, it was known as 'radiovision' as slides were issued for teachers, written and produced by Stephen Kanocz, with help from A.A. Wolff and H.J. Daus repeated Sept 69, September 1972
- Second Year Russian Radio 4 12 October 1968 on Saturdays at 10.30am, 20-part series, with Maria Sabussky, Victor Gregoriy, Marina Ryan, Tanya Kelim, Slaswek Wolkowinski, Vladimir Czugunow, written by Paddy O’Toole, in conjunction with the University of Essex, produced by Dennis Simmons; repeated in October 1969
- Incontri in Italia, Radio 4 12 October 1968 on Saturdays at 11.30am, 15-part second-stage Italian, with Giovanni Carsaniga and Anna Veneziana, produced by Elsie Ferguson and Ann Caldwell; repeated in June 1971, September 1971, and October 1972 on Radio 3
- Un Paso Mas, Radio 4 29 March 1969 on Saturdays at 10.30am, as part of 'Study on 4', 20-part second-stage Spanish, with Jacinta Castillejo, Pablo Soto, Antonio López, Fernando Agós, César Milego, Isabel de Castro and Cristina Roura, written by Brian Dutton and Ángel García de Paredes; repeated in January 1972
- Amici, buona sera!, Radio 3 6 October 1969 on Mondays at 7pm, and Fridays at 6.30pm, 30-part Italian for beginners, with Hugh Shankland and Ernesto Mussi, assisted by Silvia Gavuzzo and Aldo Bevacqua; repeated in October 1971
- Reisebüro Atlas, Radio 3 7 January 1970 on Wednesdays at 6.30pm, beginners colloquial German, 30 part-series, written by RM Oldnall and Edith Baer, with Ilse Singer, Hannah Norbert, Rolf Richards, Michael Mellinger, Emma Rock, Gerda Koeppler, David Hadda, Paul Hansard, Michael Wolf, Hugo Panczak, Angelika Sahler, and Jörg Sorensen, produced by Edith Baer; repeated in October 1970, and October 1972 on Radio 4
- Wiedersehen in Ansburg, Radio 4 24 January 1970 on Saturdays at 11am, and on Wednesdays at 6.30pm, 20-part second-stage series, with Michael Mellinger and Maria Warburg, the mother of comedian and radio host Bob Mills, written by Alexandra Marchl-von-Herwarth, produced by Edith Baer; repeated on Radio 3 in October 1971 and October 1973
- Deutsch für die Oberstufe, Radio 4 1 October 1970 on Thursdays at 10.30am, with Raymond Escoffey
- Voix de France, Radio 4 2 October 1970 on Fridays at 10.30am, French for the sixth form, a new series in September 1971, and September 1972
- Rendez-vous à Chaviray, Radio 3 12 October 1970 on Mondays at 6.30pm, as part of 'Study on 3', and on Sundays at 10.30am, as part of 'Study on 4', a 25-part second-stage course, about a fictional town called Chaviray, with Louis Bloncourt, Georges Lambert, André Maranne, Jean Lagrave, John Serret, Paulette Preney, Violetta Farjeon, Lila Valmere, written by John Ross and Madeleine le Cunff of the University of Essex, produced by Alan Wilding; repeated in October 1973
- Horizons de France, Radio 4 27 January 1971 on Wednesdays at 10.30am, for the fifth form
- A Language in Your Briefcase, Radio 3 22 February 1971 on Mondays at 7pm, 20-part series on selling to other countries, introduced by Henry Deschampsneufs, chairman of the Institute of Export,
- - French with Katia Lutz, André Marianne, and Pierre Valmer, written by Madeleine le Cunff
- - German with Walter Hertner, Michael Wolf, Michael Mellinger
- - Italian with Marisa Dillon-Weston, written by Giovanni Carsaniga
- - Spanish with Joan Shenton, Fernando Agos and Pablo Soto, written by Ángel García de Paredes
- - Portuguese with Manuela D'Oliveira and Alberto de Lacerda, written by Jorge Ribeiro, produced by Alan Wilding, Ann Caldwell, Edith Baer
- Halb gewonnen!, Radio 4 20 September 1971 on Mondays at 10.30am, 20-part O-level German course, the programme was sometimes recorded at WDR-Studio Münster in North Rhine-Westphalia, written by Stephen Kanocz; repeated in September 1972
- Vient de paraître, Radio 3 4 October 1971 on Mondays at 6.30pm, and on Radio 4 on Saturdays at 10.30am, 20-part second-stage French, presented by Catherine Graham, with Gerard Plaux, Jacques Bonnet, Paul Couster, Elma Soiron, Louis Bloncourt and Pamela Stirling, written by Richard Martineau and Anne-Marie Girolami, produced by Ann Caldwell; repeated in April 1975, on Radio 3 as part of 'Study on 3'
- Introduction to Arabic, Radio 3 27 March 1972 on Mondays at 6.30pm and on Radio 4 on Saturdays at 10.30am as 'Study on 4', 15-part series, with Baha Essaid and Nadia Tawfiq, produced by Elsie Ferguson and Geoffrey Braithwaite; repeated in March 1973 on Radio 3 and Radio 4, and in June 1977
- Tal Como Es, Radio 4 1 October 1972 on Sundays at 3pm, and Mondays on Radio 3 at 6.30pm, 20-part second-stage Spanish, with Pablo Soto, Eloisa Diez, featuring José Miguel Ortega Bariego, Núria Espert; repeated in October 1974 and May 1978 on Radio 3
- Ochen' Priyatno, Radio 3 3 October 1973 on Wednesdays at 6.30pm, 20-part beginner's course in Russian, with Tanya Feifer, Tanya Kelim, Sasha Dorogoi, and Boris Zajic; written by Michael Frewin and Albina Braithwaite, produced by David Doughan; repeated in May 1978
- Punti di vista, Radio 3 27 March 1974 on Wednesdays at 6.30pm, 20-part second-stage Italian, presented by Aldo Bevacqua, written by Maria Laura Franciosi, produced by Ann Goddard
- Euromagazine, Radio 3 4 July 1974 on Thursdays at 6.30pm, part of 'Study on 3', in French, German, Spanish and Italian, with Jean-Louis Barrault, Michael Mellinger, Talia Pareja, Isabel Soto, Miguel Peñaranda, and Nicole Church; another series in May 1975, April 1976, and on Radio 4 in June 1984, as part of 'Study on 4', a 12-part series in April 1985, an 8-part series from April 1987, and a series in May 1988, produced by David Doughan, and in 1988 by Nicole Church
- Svidaniye v Moskyve, Radio 3 2 October 1974 on Wednesdays at 6.30pm, 20-part second-stage Russian, with Tanya Feifer, Sasha Dorogoi, Eugene Isotow, Maria Gordeeva, Victor Nossoff, Tolya Kurdynovsky, written by Michael Frewin and Albina Braithwaite, produced by David Doughan
- Kontakte, Radio 3 9 October 1974 on Wednesdays at 7pm, with Lutz Liebelt, written by Edith Baer, produced by Iris Sprankling, with associated TV series
- Wegweiser, Radio 3 1 October 1975 on Wednesdays at 6.30pm, a follow-on 20-part series for advanced German, after Kontakte, with Jürgen Andersen and Gabi Englet, written by Anne Cuff, produced by Rodney Mantle
- Ensemble, Radio 3 1 October 1975 on Wednesdays at 7pm, 24-part French, companion radio series to the TV series, with Yves Loisel, written by John Ross, produced by Alan Wilding
- Starting Chinese, Radio 3 24 March 1976 on Wednesdays at 6.30pm, 25-part series for beginners, with Lucia Liu and Terry Chang, written by David Pollard, produced by Elsie Ferguson, executive producer Edith Baer
- Sur le vif, Radio 3 6 October 1976 on Wednesdays at 7pm, 20-part second-stage after Ensemble, with Anne-Marie Pelletier, written by Anne Gruneberg, produced by Susan Paton
- Get by in Spanish, Radio 3 24 March 1977, presented by María Antonia Marcos and Eduardo Delgado, written by Jane Freeland, who wrote the series book with Isabel del Rio (a BBC World Service presenter) ISBN 0563162570, published 1 August 1978; repeated in June 1977, March 1978, August 1978 and on Radio 4 in February 1985 and May 1986
- Get by in German, Radio 3 28 March 1977, with Jürgen Andersen and Gabi Englet, written by Edith Baer; repeated in May 1977, and September 1977 and on Radio 4 in November 1984, and in April 1986
- Allez France!, Radio 3 5 October 1977 on Wednesdays at 7pm, presented by Anne-Marie Pelletier, written by John Ross, produced by Alan Wilding
- Get by in French, Radio 3 28 March 1978 on Tuesdays at 6.30pm and Thursdays at 7pm, 5-part series presented by Bénédicte Paviot and Daniel André Pageon, written by Celia Weber, who wrote the series book with Pierrick Picot, produced by Christopher Stone, executive producer Edith Baer (head of further education for BBC Radio); repeated in September 1978, and on Radio 4 in July 1984 and February 1985
- ¡Digame!, Radio 4 5 October 1980 on Sundays at 5pm, 20-part Spanish, written by Bob Winterflood and José Escribano, published 1 September 1978 ISBN 0563162260, produced by Mick Webb; repeated in October 1985
- Get By In Greek, Radio 4 11 April 1983 at 11pm all-week, with Christina Coucounara and Yorgos Yannoulopoulos, written by David Hardy, produced by Christopher Stone; repeated in February 1985, April 1988 and April 1989
- Get By in Italian, Radio 4 9 September 1984 on Sundays at 4.30pm, 5-part beginners, presented by Annamaria Grecas and Giancarlo Ciccone, written by Bob Powell, produced by Mick Webb; repeated in July 1986 and July 1988
- Por Aqui, Radio 4 30 September 1984, on Sundays at 5.30pm, and Fridays at 11.30pm, 20-part second-stage Spanish, from interviews in Santiago de Compostela, broadcast under the 'Study on 4' name, presented by Isabel Soto and Miguel Peñaranda, written by Bob Winterflood; repeated in October 1986
- A vous la France! (with TV series), Radio 4 7 October 1984 on Sundays at 5pm and Wednesdays at 11pm, part of the 'Study on 4', 15-part beginners series, with Yves Aubert, written and produced by Alan Wilding
- Deutscher Club 7 January 1985 Radio 4 Schools Radio short 5-part series, with Christoph Undenmeyer and Detmar Hauke, produced by Al Wolff
- Get By in Portuguese, Radio 4 17 April 1985 on Wednesdays at 11pm, 5-part beginners, presented by Suzette Macedo and Carlos Alves, written by Penny Newman, produced by Christopher StoneR; repeated in June 1986, March 1987, and June 1988
- Get By in Arabic, Radio 4 1 September 1985, on Sundays at 4.30pm, a 6-part series, set in Cairo, designed for holiday-makers, presented by Egyptian novelist Ahdaf Soueif and the actor Alix Refaie, written by Hilary Wise, of Queen Mary College, and Salah El-Ghobashy, who both wrote the BBC book, published 1 September 1985 ISBN 0563211679, produced by Alan Wilding; repeated in February 1986, June 1987, September 1988, and September 1989
- France Extra!, Radio 4 29 September 1985, on Sundays at 5pm, presented by Juliette Mole and Jean-Michel Duffrene (recently a presenter with French Radio London), with Chantal Cuer, written by Duncan Shiels and Elspeth Broady, produced by Nicole Church (who attended the Lycée Français Charles de Gaulle, in London)
- Buongiorno Italia!, Radio 4 12 October 1986, 20-part series for beginners, with a repeat of the TV series on BBC1, with Denise de Rome, produced by Alan Wilding
- Franc-parler, Radio 4 3 January 1987 on Saturdays at 4.30pm, 10-part series presented by Corinne Baudelot and Grégoire Carel, repeated in June 1987 and October 1989
- Deutsch Express!, Radio 4 10 January 1987 on Saturdays and Sundays at 5pm, 15-part second-stage German, after Deutsch Direkt!, presented by Irmgard Meyer, actor Jorg Walesch and Renate Harrington, written by Wolfgang Keinhorst, produced by Nicole Church; repeated in January 1990 and October 1992 (on the new Radio 5)
- When in Spain Radio 4 19 April 1987 on Sundays at 5.30pm, a 5-part series, presented by Andrew Sachs, with Miguel Peñaranda and Cristina Lago, written and produced by Alan Wilding.
- L'Italia dal vivo, Radio 4 10 October 1987, 20-part second stage series, with Denise de Rome, written by Bob Powell
- España Viva, Radio 4 1 November 1987, 15-part series for beginners, with TV series, produced by Carol Stanley and Mick Webb
- Ganz spontan!, Radio 4 3 January 1988 Sundays at 5.30pm, 20-part series, third-stage German, presented by Sabine Michael, Lutz Liebelt and Peter Sahla, written and produced by Iris Sprankling
- Get By in Japanese, Radio 4 14 February 1988 on Saturdays at 5.30pm, 6-part introduction, with Masae Marr and Takeyoshi Kawashima, written by Chihoko Moran, produced by Frank Warwick; repeated in May 1989 on Sundays
- Get By in Chinese, Radio 4 15 October 1988 on Saturdays at 5.30pm, 6-part series, with Paul Crook and Liu Yuan produced by Kathy Flower; repeated in February 1989
- When in Italy, Radio 4 1 April 1989, 5-part series, with associated TV series, with Denise de Rome, produced by Mick Webb; repeated in September 1989 and November 1995, and on Radio 5 in October 1992
- Get By In Turkish, Radio 4 6 May 1989 on Saturdays at 5.30pm, with Bengisu Rona (having met when a student in London, later working at SOAS University of London from the 1980s, on 23 September 1968, aged 26, in Istanbul, she had married the 34-year-old Labour MP David Winnick, who would be replaced by Eddie Hughes in 2017) and Tayfun Ertan; written by Alan Wilding
- Get By in Russian, Radio 4 7 January 1990 on Sundays at 5pm, 6-part series, with Edward Ochagavia, of the World Service Russian Service and Ludmilla Matthews (her son is the writer Owen Matthews) of the University of London
- Make German Your Business, Radio 5 21 November 1993 on Sundays at 8.30pm, 5-part series; repeated in November 1994
- The French Experience, Radio 4 9 October 1994 Sundays at 8.30pm, with Chantal Cuer
- Short Stories In French, Radio 4 9 October 1994 Sunday evenings, fifteen minutes, four works by Alphonse Daudet, Émile Zola, Guy de Maupassant, and Colette, produced by Iris Sprankling; repeated in December 1995
- Short Stories in Spanish, Radio 4 6 November 1994, Sunday evenings, fifteen minutes, four works by Pedro Antonio de Alarcón, Jesús Fernández Santos, Horacio Quiroga of Uruguay, and Juan Rulfo of Mexico, read by Yolanda Vázquez and Guillermo Leon-Ruiz, with an explanation by Mike Gonzalez of the University of Glasgow, produced by Iris Sprankling; repeated in January 1996
- Short Stories in Italian, Radio 4 4 December 1994, Sunday evenings, fifteen minutes, four works by Antonio Tabucchi, Italo Calvino, Leonardo Sciascia, and Elsa Morante, read by Giovanna Price of the BBC World Service, with an explanation by Loredana Polezzi of the University of Warwick
- Sueños World Spanish, Radio 4 8 October 1995, on Sundays at 8pm, with a series on BBC1, 16-part series, presented by Robert Elms
- Short Stories in German, Radio 4 8 October 1995, on Sunday evenings, fifteen minutes, four works by Heinrich von Kleist, Wolfdietrich Schnurre, Heinrich Böll, and Siegfried Lenz, read by German voice actress Aletta Lohmeyer
- Francophonie, Radio 4 31 December 1995, 5-part series
- Deutsch Plus 1, Radio 4 6 October 1996 on Sundays at 8pm, with a corresponding TV series, set in the fictional 'Deutschland Plus' TV station, or D Plus, set in Cologne, 16-part series, introduced by Philip Brady, produced by Lore Windemuth and Nick Webb
- Deutsch Plus 2, Radio 4 12 October 1997 on Sundays at 8pm, an introduction to German culture, not the fictional television station, this was probably the last language education radio series that the BBC made, under the 'Language Extras' name, produced by Alan Wilding

== European schools in the United Kingdom ==
- German School London in south-west London which was established to promote the German language and teach children of embassy staff; it opened in 1971
- Lycée Français Charles de Gaulle in South Kensington; it was set up by the Agency for French Education Abroad and was founded in 1915
- EIFA International School London in Marylebone; run by the Mission laïque française and the French government; it opened in 2013
- Lycée International de Londres Winston Churchill; it opened at Wembley in 2015, opened by President François Hollande on 22 September 2015; 92% get to Russell Group universities
- Instituto Español Vicente Cañada Blanch, situated in Kensington, it was opened in London in 1972, being run by the Spanish government
- European School, Culham in Oxfordshire since 1978, a former European School (the first was in Luxembourg in 1953); since 2017 it has been called the Europa School UK
- Institut français du Royaume-Uni in London since 1910 and the French Institute for Scotland in Edinburgh; set up by the Institut Français, an outreach agency for the French language
- The Swedish School in London
- Greek Secondary School of London
- The Norwegian School in London
- Russian Embassy School in London

== Demographics of Language learners and attitudes ==
Language education in the United Kingdom is predominately done by middle-class girls. Most British students find the lessons boring and unengaging.

== Results by LEA in England for French ==
In 2016 there were 8459 entries for French A-level in England, with 5999 entered by the state sector (grammar schools, sixth form colleges and comprehensive schools).

=== Lowest number of entries for French A-level ===
- Knowsley 0 (Knowsley only entered 61 A-levels in 2016)
- Sandwell 4
- Blackburn 5
- Luton 5
- Redcar and Cleveland 5
- Thurrock 5
- Wolverhampton 5
- Barnsley 6
- Hartlepool 6
- Stockton 6
- Blackpool 7
- Rochdale 7
- Salford 7
- South Tyneside 7
- Tameside 7
- Barking 9
- Haringey 9
- Bolton 10
- Halton 10
- Middlesbrough 10
- North Lincolnshire 10
- Swindon 10
- Bracknell Forest 11
- Bradford 11
- Tower Hamlets 11
- Hackney 12
- Medway 12
- Sunderland 12
- Gateshead 13
- Southwark 14
- Doncaster 15
- North East Lincolnshire 15
- Southampton 15
- Calderdale 17
- North Somerset 17
- Oldham 17
- Windsor and Maidenhead 17
- Stockport 18
- Stoke-on-Trent 18
- Wakefield 18
- Walsall 18
- Bedford 19
- Coventry 19
- Kingston upon Hull 19
- North Tyneside 19

Outer London enters considerably more French A-levels than Inner London; Inner London enters few French A-levels.

=== Highest number of entries for French A-level ===
- Hampshire 223
- Kent 196
- Hertfordshire 182
- Surrey 165
- Essex 148
- Buckinghamshire 143
- Gloucestershire 135
- Lancashire 116
- Oxfordshire 115
- North Yorkshire 107
- Birmingham 104

== Results by LEA in England for German ==
There were 3446 A-level entries for German in 2016 in England, with 2558 entries from the state sector.

=== Highest number of entries for German A-level ===
- Hampshire 101
- Hertfordshire 91
- Lancashire 78
- Essex 75
- Kent 64
- Surrey 58
- Lincolnshire 57
- Buckinghamshire 51

== See also ==
- Association for Language Learning, founded in 1990, the association for language education in UK, headquartered in Derbyshire
- Chartered Institute of Linguists, produces The Linguist
- The Modern Humanities Research Association is in Cambridge, and produces The Year's Work in Modern Language Studies
- Subject Centre for Languages Linguistics and Area Studies (LLAS), a former organisation based at the University of Southampton.
- Category:Language education materials
