= Learning and Teaching Support Network =

Former UK higher education initiative

The Learning and Teaching Support Network (LTSN) was an initiative of the United Kingdom higher education bodies to promote high quality learning and teaching in all subject disciplines in higher education. It was intended to support the sharing of innovation and good practices in learning and teaching including the use, where appropriate, of communications and information technology.

== Overview ==
LTSN operated through a set of 24 centres, specific to different subjects such as Engineering or English, so that good practice appropriate to that subject could be gathered and disseminated, and building up a network of practitioners.

In May 2004 the LTSN merged with the Institute for Learning and Teaching in Higher Education (ILTHE) and the National Co-ordination Team (NCT) to form the Higher Education Academy. The Subject Centres continued, but were closed in 2011.

== Subject Centres ==
The LTSN comprised a set of 24 subject centres, listed below.

- Art, Design and Communication
- Bioscience
- Built Environment
- Business Management and Accountancy
- Economics Network
- Education (ESCALATE) Subject Centre
- Engineering
- English
- Geography, Earth and Environmental Sciences
- Health Sciences and Practice
- History, Classics and Archaeology
- Hospitality, Leisure, Sport and Tourism
- Information and Computer Sciences
- Languages, Linguistics and Area Studies
- Law (UK Centre for Legal Education)
- Materials (UK Centre for Materials Education)
- Maths, Stats & OR Network
- Medicine, Dentistry and Veterinary Medicine
- Performing Arts (PALATINE)
- Philosophical and Religious Studies
- Physical Sciences
- Psychology
- Sociology, Anthropology and Politics
- Social Policy and Social Work (SWAP)

== See also ==
- Education and Skills Funding Agency
