= Engineering Subject Centre =

Coordinates: 52.761455°N 1.240516°W

The logo of the Higher Education Academy Engineering Subject Centre

The Engineering Subject Centre (EngSC) was one of 24 subject centres within the Higher Education Academy from 2000 to 2011. The academy encouraged, supported and enabled teaching excellence in the United Kingdom higher education community. This was achieved through development of research and evaluation both for the higher education (HE) community as a whole and through the discipline-specific expertise of the subject centres. The stated aim of the academy is: "to improve the learning experience for students".

The Engineering Subject Centre was based in the Faculty of Engineering at Loughborough University. It drew upon the expertise of engineering academics and educationalists from across the higher education sector, and worked closely with the engineering professional bodies.

== History ==
The centre was originally created as part of the Learning and Teaching Support Network (LTSN), founded in January 2000. The Higher Education Academy was founded in May 2004, from a merger of the Institute for Learning and Teaching in Higher Education (ILTHE), the LTSN, and the Teaching Quality Enhancement Fund National Co-ordination Team. As a part of the Higher Education Academy, the subject centre was funded by grants from four higher education funding bodies in the UK (Higher Education Funding Council for England, Scottish Funding Council, Higher Education Funding Council for Wales, and Department for Employment and Learning), subscriptions from higher education institutions, and grant/contract income for organised initiatives. In 2010 it was announced that all subject centres would be closed, and a reduced service to subjects provided by the HEA at York. This process was completed in 2011

== Work areas ==
=== Engineering Subject Centre Mini-Projects ===
Projects were awarded up to £3500 over 12 months to complete small scale research or development projects.

=== Events ===
The Centre maintained a comprehensive list of both national and international events. The centre also held a number of events every year covering a diverse range of subjects relating to the practice of the working engineering academic. Although for a UK audience many subjects covered are related to worldwide practice.

=== Engineering Education: Journal of the Higher Education Academy Engineering Subject Centre ===
Engineering Education was a peer-reviewed, international journal freely available via the website of the Engineering Subject Centre and distributed in paper format to all UK university libraries and Engineering departments. Engineering Education was published in the summer and winter each year. The journal supported papers in the traditional format and those incorporating or demonstrating multimedia and web technology.

=== Educational resources ===
The Engineering Subject Centre's Resource Database had direct online links to around 1500 approved engineering-specific and general learning and teaching resources, such as guides, reports, case studies and organisational websites, in addition to the centre's own range of publications.
