= Subject Centre for Languages Linguistics and Area Studies =

LLAS Centre for Languages, Linguistics and Area Studies (2011-2016)
- Predecessor: Higher Education Academy Subject Centre for Languages, Linguistics and Area Studies (de facto).
- Successor: None
- Formation: 2011
- Dissolved: 2016
- Location: University of Southampton
- Region served: UK
- Leader: Michael Kelly OBE
- Parent organization: University of Southampton
- Website: www.llas.ac.uk

LLAS was a staff development centre based at the University of Southampton which provided services to academic staff across the UK (and to a certain extent Europe-wide) teaching Languages, Linguistics and Area Studies in higher education. Its first incarnation was as a subject centre of the Learning and Teaching Support Network (2000-2004), then a subject centre of the Higher Education Academy (2004-2011). Its second incarnation was as an enterprise unit of the University of Southampton.

== LTSN/ HEA Subject Centre for Languages, Linguistics and Area Studies 2000-2011 ==
The Subject Centre for Languages, Linguistics and Area Studies, (also known as LLAS) was one of 24 subject centres of the Higher Education Academy in the United Kingdom. Formed in 2000 as part of the Learning and Teaching Support Network (LTSN), LLAS was hosted by the University of Southampton 2000-2011, jointly with the University of Hull, 2000-2003. In 2004 the functions of LTSN were incorporated into the newly formed Higher Education Academy. It had a UK-wide remit to support teachers of languages, linguistics and area studies in UK higher education. It was funded via the Higher Education Funding Council for England, the Higher Education Funding Council for Wales, the Scottish Funding Council and the Department for Employment and Learning (Northern Ireland).

LLAS activities were supported and informed by a number of advisory committees, made up of academics representing languages, linguistics and area studies disciplines. The largest of these committees was the Advisory Board, but there were also Specialist Advisory groups for each of the three subject areas. There were advisory groups for Scotland, Wales and Northern Ireland, and a number of special interest groups (SIGs) including 'literature and culture' and a group for teachers of "Less Widely Used Less Taught" languages (LWULT).

LLAS had a partnership with CILT, The National Centre for Languages.

The Director of LLAS was Michael Kelly OBE, who is also Emeritus Professor of French at Southampton University. Other staff included a team of academic co-ordinators, a web development team, and an administration team.

== The post Higher Education Academy era: LLAS Centre for Languages, Linguistics and Area Studies, 2011-2016 ==
In November 2010 it was announced that the Higher Education Academy would no longer be funding its subject centres. The centre continued many of its activities as an enterprise unit at the University of Southampton until Summer 2016 when it finally closed down. The website is now archived and no longer actively maintained.

== Activities ==
=== Academic development ===
LLAS organized a variety of staff development workshops, conferences and seminars. It published research and reports relating to the teaching of languages, linguistics and area studies. LLAS also provided funding for pedagogic research, action research and the development of teaching materials. The LLAS website also includes the peer-reviewed Good Practice Guide

=== Promotional materials ===
LLAS also produced materials to help teachers and university lecturers promote languages, linguistics and American Studies in schools and further education colleges.

=== Routes into languages ===
LLAS hosted the England-wide Routes into Languages project which was funded by HEFCE, the Higher Education Funding Council for England (£4.5 million) and the Department for Children, Schools and Families (£3.5 million). Routes into Languages aims to increase the take-up for modern foreign languages in English primary and secondary schools, and promote careers in translating and interpreting.

=== Links into languages ===
Links into Languages provided staff development for language teachers in English primary schools and secondary schools delivered via regional centres. 'Links' was led by LLAS in partnership with the Specialist Schools and Academies Trust(SSAT) and the Association for Language Learning (ALL).

=== Liaison magazine ===
LLAS published "Liaison" magazine twice a year. The magazine contained news, feature articles and book reviews and was distributed free to UK subscribers in print form. Back issues are available from the archived LLAS website in pdf format.

=== Externally funded projects ===
LLAS produced the HEFCE funded International Approaches to Islamic Studies' in partnership with the Subject Centre for Philosophical and Religious Studies.

Other projects included the EU-funded Language Cafe, the Language Network for Quality Assurance (LANQUA) and HumBox, a repository for sharing open educational resources in the humanities. LLAS was also a partner in the Higher Education Academy's Islamic Studies Network.
