= Lisa Emerson =

New Zealand educator

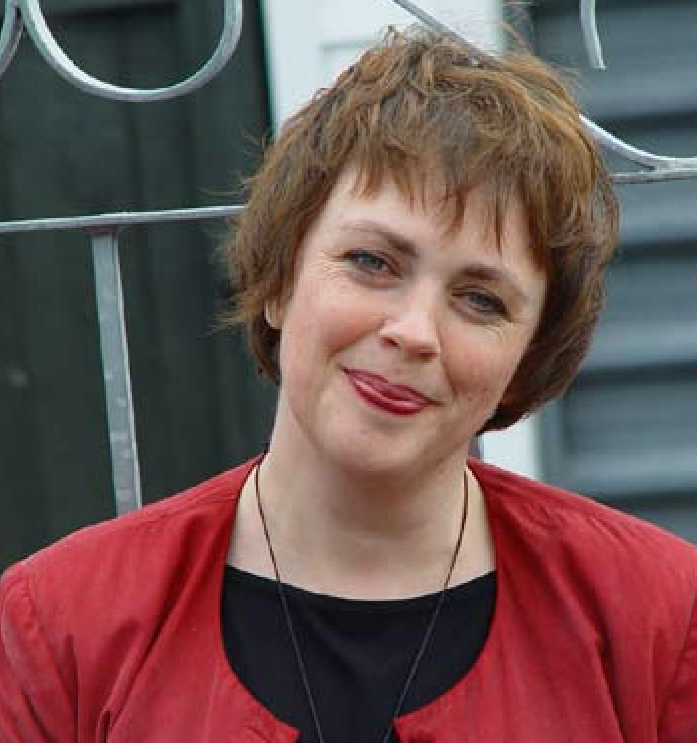
- Emerson in 2007
- Awards: NZ Prime Minister's Supreme Award for Teaching Excellence (2008); Fulbright Scholarship (2013)

Academic background
- Education: Massey University
- Thesis: A collaborative approach to integrating the teaching of writing into the sciences in a New Zealand tertiary context (2000)

Academic work
- Discipline: Science writing, tertiary teaching, information literacy
- Institutions: Massey University

Lisa Emerson is a New Zealand academic and as of 2019 is a full professor and director of teaching and learning at Massey University.

== Academic career ==
Emerson graduated with an MA (1988) and a PhD (2000) from Massey University. She joined the staff of Massey in 1989, being appointed associate professor in 2010 and the promoted to full professor from 1 January 2019.

In 2008 Emerson received the New Zealand Prime Minister's Supreme Award for Teaching Excellence. Iain Hay included her teaching method in his 2011 book, Inspiring Academics. She was awarded a Fulbright Scholarship in 2013. She was appointed a principal fellow of the Higher Education Academy in May 2019.

== Selected works ==
- Hampton, John; Emerson, Lisa; Mackay, Bruce R (1999), Writing guidelines for postgraduate science students, Dunmore Press, ISBN 9780864693396
- Emerson, Lisa; Hampton, John, eds. (2005), Writing guidelines for science and applied science students (2nd ed.), Thomson/Dunmore Press, ISBN 9780170124829
- Emerson, Lisa, ed. (2005), Writing guidelines for social science students (2nd ed.), Thomson/Dunmore Press, ISBN 0170128458
- Emerson, Lisa, ed. (2007), Writing guidelines for education students (2nd ed.), Cengage Learning, ISBN 9780170130042
- Emerson, Lisa (2013), Writing guidelines for business students (4th ed.), Cengage Learning, ISBN 9780170216388
- Emerson, Lisa (2016), The forgotten tribe: Scientists as writers, University Press of Colorado, ISBN 9781607326434
