= FRL =

FRL can refer to:

- Fairlie railway station, in Scotland
- Film Reference Library, a Canadian film archive
- Fire Research Laboratory, part of the United States Bureau of Alcohol, Tobacco, Firearms and Explosives
- First Rail London, train operator in England
- Fish Rap Live!, a publication at the University of California, Santa Cruz
- Flight Refuelling Ltd, now Cobham plc, a British manufacturer
- Florida Rookie League, now the Gulf Coast League, an American Minor League Baseball league
- Forest reference level, also known as Forest reference emission level
- Forlì Airport, in Italy
- Frame representation language
- Freedom Airlines, a defunct American airline
- French Radio London, a French-language internet radio station based in London
- Friesland, a province of the Netherlands
  - .frl, the Internet top-level domain for Friesland
- Fundació Ramon Llull (Ramon Llull Foundation) a Catalan cultural organization
- Furnace Room Lullaby, an album by Neko Case & Her Boyfriends
- Freedom of Russia Legion, Russians fighting for Ukraine during the 2022 Russian invasion of Ukraine
