= Academic administration =

Branch of university or college employees

Academic administration is a branch of university or college employees responsible for the maintenance and supervision of the institution and separate from the faculty or academics, although some personnel may have joint responsibilities. Some type of separate administrative structure exists at almost all academic institutions. Fewer institutions are governed by employees who are also involved in academic or scholarly work. Many senior administrators are academics who have advanced degrees and no longer teach or conduct research.

== Key responsibilities ==
Key broad administrative responsibilities (and thus administrative units) in academic institutions include:

- Admissions
- Supervision of academic affairs such as hiring, promotion, tenure, and evaluation (with faculty input where appropriate);
- Maintenance of official records (typically supervised by a registrar);
- Maintenance and audit of financial flows and records;
- Maintenance and construction of campus buildings and grounds (the physical plant);
- Safety and security of people and property on the campus (often organized as an office of public safety or campus police);
- Supervision and support of campus computers and network (information technology).
- Fundraising from private individuals and foundations ("development" or "advancement")
- Research administration (including grants and contract administration, and institutional compliance with federal and state regulations)
- Public affairs (including relations with the media, the community, and local, state, and federal governments)
- Student services such as disability services, career counselling and library staff.

== Administrative titles ==
The chief executive, the administrative and educational head of a university, depending on tradition and location, may be termed the university president, the provost, the chancellor (the United States), the vice-chancellor (many Commonwealth countries), principal (Scotland and Canada), or rector (Europe, Russia, Asia, the Middle East and South America).

An administrative executive in charge of a university department or of some schools, may be termed a dean or some variation. The chief executive of academic establishments other than universities, may be termed headmaster or head teacher (schools), director (used to reflect various positions ranging from the head of an institution to the head of a program), or principal, as used in primary education.

== Administrative communication ==
Like other professional areas, academic administration follows a specialized and often highly abstract terminology. This terminology often depends on that used in military strategy (as in Strategic Planning) and business management (including Public Relations).

The digital era brings a communication overload and intense stresses of the job are threatening administrators mental or physical health. Administrators are operating in an era of multiple continuing crises, unreliable supply chains, etc. Prof. David D. Perlmutter, Dean of the College of Media & Communication at Texas Tech University, suggests several questions to ask about regularly-held administrative meetings:

- Are these meetings necessary?
- Must they be held this often?
- What is the best way to distribute information, especially in a governance culture, so people can be aware of it and act upon it without being overwhelmed?
- Do people understand the steps and goals of the process, or are they just participating out of tradition?
- Can the number of participants be reduced without hurting governance?
- Do we need to modify any of our processes because of the lack of face-to-face interactions that have occurred off and on since the pandemic began?

== By country ==
Academic administrations are structured in various ways at different institutions and in different countries.

=== Australia ===
Full-time tertiary education administrators emerged as a distinct role in Australia from the mid-1970s, as institutions sought to deal with their increasing size and complexity, along with a broadening of their aspirations. As the professionalism of tertiary administrators has developed, there has been a corresponding push to recognise the uniqueness and validity of their role in the academic environment.

As of 2004, general staff composed over half the employees at Australian universities. Around 65% of these are female. There has recently been a shift in the preferred nomenclature for non-academic staff at Australian universities, from "general staff" to "professional staff". It has been argued that the changing in role of the professional staff has been due to the changing work that they are performing, as professional staff assist students with technology.

The overarching body for all staff working in administration and management in Australia is the Association for Tertiary Education Management.

=== Ireland ===
In Ireland, statutes for universities and technological universities set out roles for governing bodies, chief officers and academic councils. For universities, the Universities Act 1997 provides that each university has a governing authority and that the functions of the university are performed by or on the directions of that authority. The chief officer is appointed by the governing authority and may be called the president, provost or another title determined by the institution. Each university also has an academic council which controls academic affairs, including curriculum, instruction and education, subject to statutory constraints and review by the governing authority.

A broadly similar model applies to technological universities. Under the Technological Universities Act 2018, each technological university has a governing body and a chief officer called the president, and must have an academic council. The academic council's statutory functions include control of academic affairs, programme development, recommendations on admissions and assessment regulations, and other academic functions delegated by the institution.

At national level, the Higher Education Authority (HEA; Irish: An tÚdarás um Ard-Oideachas) plans and funds higher education and research provision, monitors expenditure by funded bodies, assesses institutional performance and supports governance frameworks for designated higher education institutions. The Higher Education Authority Act 2022 also provides for system performance frameworks and performance agreements with designated institutions.

=== United Kingdom ===
==== Administrative structures ====
The structures for administration and management in higher education in the United Kingdom vary significantly between institutions. Any description of a general structure will therefore not apply to some or even many institutions, and therefore any general statement of structures may be misleading. Not all UK universities have the post of Registrar.

The Director of Finance may report to the Registrar or directly to the Vice-Chancellor, whilst other senior posts may or may not report to the Registrar. This next tier of senior positions might include Directors of Human Resources, Estates, and Corporate Affairs. The Academic Registrar is often included in this next tier. Their role is mostly to accomplish student-facing administrative processes such as admissions, student records, complaints, and graduation.

==== Professional associations ====
The overarching body for all staff working in administration and management in the UK is the Association of University Administrators.

=== United States ===
The number of administrators on university campuses has grown dramatically in recent decades, one reason that the rise in college tuition costs has outstripped the rate of inflation.

==== Presidents and chancellors ====
In the United States, a college or university is typically supervised by a president or chancellor who reports regularly to a board of trustees (made up of individuals from outside the institution) and who acts as chief executive officer. Most large colleges and universities now use an administrative structure with a tier of vice presidents, among whom the provost (or vice president for academic affairs, or academic dean) as the chief academic officer. Although the demographic picture of university leadership is changing, the majority of academic administrators remain middle-aged white men.

===== Remuneration of presidents and chancellors =====
The ten highest-paid administrators at private colleges earn an average of about $2.5 million per year, while at public colleges the figure is $1.4 million. These figures includes both base pay and other income.

==== Deans ====
Deans may supervise various and more specific aspects of the institution, or may be CEOs of entire campuses. They may report directly to the president or chancellor. The division of responsibility among deans varies widely among institutions; some are chiefly responsible for clusters of academic fields (such as the humanities or natural sciences) or whole academic units (such as a graduate school or college), while others are responsible for non-academic but campus-wide concerns such as minority affairs. In some cases a provost supervises the institution's entire academic staff, occupying a position generally superior to any dean. In other instances the Dean of a College may be the equivalent to a Provost or Vice Chancellor or Vice President for Academic Affairs. Below deans in the administrative hierarchy are heads of individual academic departments and of individual administrative departments. These heads (commonly styled "chairs" or "directors") then supervise the faculty and staff of their individual departments.

==== Departmental Chairs ====
The Chair of a department is typically a tenured or at least tenure-track faculty member, supported by administrative staff.
