= Peter Goodhew =

Peter John Goodhew CBE FREng (born 3 July 1943, in London) is an electron microscopist who has published extensively on metallic and semiconducting materials and has authored or co-authored several widely used books on transmission (and scanning transmission) electron microscopy. He was the leader of the UK SuperSTEM project at the STFC Daresbury Laboratory for ten years and has been Dean of Engineering and Pro-Vice-Chancellor at the University of Liverpool.

During his career at the Universities of Surrey and Liverpool he established the MATTER computer-based learning project and was the founding Director of the UK Centre for Materials Education (UKCME), one of the Subject Centres of the Higher Education Academy.

Goodhew was appointed Commander of the Order of the British Empire (CBE) in the 2017 New Year Honours for services to Engineering and Education.

== Books ==
Goodhew is the author of the 2010 book Teaching Engineering, published by UKCME.
