= Karen Rafferty =

Irish electrical and electronic engineer

- Born: Karen McMenemy
- Education: Queen's University Belfast
- Known for: Virtual reality
- Scientific career
- Workplaces: Queen's University Belfast

Karen Rafferty (née McMenemy) is the Head of the School of Electronics, Electrical Engineering and Computer Science at Queen's University Belfast. She works with virtual and augmented reality for health care and automation.

== Early life and education ==
Rafferty is an alumnus of St. Patrick's Girls Academy, Dungannon County Tyrone and studied Electrical and Electronic Engineering at Queen's University Belfast. After undertaking a year of industrial practice with NIE and in Norway she earned her master's degree with distinction in 1999. She stayed there for her graduate studies, and was a doctoral student specialising in imaging processing. Her PhD was supported by the Civil Aviation Authority to investigate pattern recognition techniques and image processing. Her research involved environmental sensing, and in particular considered the automatic assessment and validation of the performance of airport landing lighting arrays. After completing her PhD, under the guidance of Dr. Gordon Dodds, she worked as a teaching fellow, and completed a Postgraduate Certificate in Higher Education in 2005. Rafferty made various innovations in teaching, including introducing computer graphics and animation into the assessment modules of the course in Electrical and Electronic Engineering. Since 2000 her research interests have led her to focus most on Virtual and Augmented Reality, especially: how the visual aspects of VR and AR can be enhanced through the interface to other senses.

== Research and career ==
Rafferty was appointed a lecturer in the School of Electronics and Electrical Engineering at Queen's University Belfast. She became interested in virtual reality and tactile feedback. Her research focuses on health and training and industry and automation. She is involved with Performance without Barriers, a research program that improves access to music and performance.

In 2016 Rafferty was made Deputy Head of the School of Electronics, Electrical Engineering and Computer Science (EEECS) at Queen's University Belfast. She was promoted to Head of School in 2018. She serves as the Athena Swan coordinator for EEECS, and has been involved with their Engineering and Physical Sciences Research Council (EPSRC) Inclusion Matters grant. She serves as a judge for the Belfast Telegraph IT awards. In 2019 she announced forty full scholarships in cybersecurity at Queen's University Belfast.

=== Awards and honours ===
Her awards and honours include;

- 2005 Royal Academy of Engineering Teaching Award
- 2011 Worshipful Company of Scientific Instrument Makers Award
- 2011 Institution of Engineering and Technology Innovation Award
- 2018 Queen’s University of Belfast Students Union Most Inspiring and Motivating Teaching Staff Members
- 2019 Springer Best Paper Award

=== Selected publications ===
Her publications include;

- Rafferty, Karen (2014). Engineering Innovative Products Practical Experience. Wiley. ISBN 9781118757734.
- Rafferty, Karen (2010). "Short, medium and long term load forecasting model and virtual load forecaster based on radial basis function neural networks" (PDF). International Journal of Electrical Power & Energy Systems. 32 (7): 743–750. doi:10.1016/j.ijepes.2010.01.009.
- McMenemy, Karen (2007). "A hitchhiker's guide to virtual reality". AK Peters/CRC Press. doi:10.1201/b10677. ISBN 9780429108334.
