= Judith Shapiro (economist) =

American economist

Dr. Judith Shapiro is a Senior Lecturer in Practice in the Department of Economics at the London School of Economics. The main body of her work lies in Russian Transitional and Post-Transitional Economics as well as the Economics of Health and Population. More recently, she has also researched and discussed the economics of gender.

== Life and education ==
Shapiro was born in New York City, New York. She earned a bachelor's degree in economics at the University of Chicago in 1962. She would later go on to earn a PhD in economics from the London School of Economics in 1966. She worked in several different European countries before eventually coming back to the London School of Economics in 2005 to become a Senior Lecturer.

== Work ==
Since 2005, Shapiro has been a senior lecturer at the London School of Economics. She previously worked as Chief of the Transition Economies Section for the United Nations Economic Commission for Europe in Geneva. She later went on to teach Health Economics at the New Economic School in Moscow. During her time in Russia, Shapiro was a part of the Macroeconomic and Finance Unit advising the Russian Ministry of Finance (the 'Sachs' team') during the immediate aftermath of the fall of the Soviet Union, serving there from 1993 to 1994. She also held the role of advisor to the Swedish Ministry of Foreign Affairs. In 2018, she taught a course titled Economics of Gender at the LSE-PKU Summer School.

== Authorship ==
Shapiro has co-authored three books on transitional economics in Eastern Europe and has contributed to or commented on numerous academic journal articles. as well as news articles, including at the Washington Post and the United Nations' PassBlue.

== Talks and debates ==
Shapiro has participated in several public talks, most recently as the chair of the London School of Economics' Economic Symposium in September 2019. The symposium focused on the long-term effects of the 2008 financial crisis and the future of economics because of it. She also co-chaired a discussion with the former Governor of the National Bank of Ukraine on April 30, 2019, hosted by the LSE SU Ukrainian Society. The discussion focused on recent reforms to the Ukrainian financial sector. Shapiro also participated in a debate focused on whether or not Karl Marx was right about capitalism and its connection to the economic divide between the rich and the poor. Shapiro argued against this. A video of the debate was published on the Intelligence Squared website. Shapiro was also invited to talk in Series 4 of the BBC's Four Thought in 2013 and was a speaker at a TEDx Talk in 2018.

== Membership ==
Shapiro is currently an associate of the UK's Economics Network and a member of its management board since 2012. In this role, she has contributed to the organization of the Economics Network's various events, teaching material, and research. In 2010, the Economics Network awarded her the Student Nominated Award.
