= Alison Johns =

Academic background
- Education: Lancaster University

Alison Johns was the chief executive of Advance HE in the UK.

She was previously chief executive of the Leadership Foundation for Higher Education, and helped lead the LFHE into a merger with the Equality Challenge Unit and the Higher Education Academy to form Advance HE in 2018. In December 2017 she was named as the chief executive officer-designate of the new organisation.

She is also a past president of the Association of University Administrators.

In 2024, she is also a non-executive member of Court at the University of St Andrews.

== Education ==
Johns has a masters in management learning from Lancaster University where she studied part-time in the 1990s.
