= Goodhew =

Goodhew is a surname, and may refer to:

- Goodhew (Kent cricketer) (flourished 18th century; first name unknown), English cricketer
- Billy Goodhew (1828–1897), English cricketer
- Duncan Goodhew (born 1957), English competitive swimmer
- Harry Goodhew (born 1931), Anglican Archbishop of Sydney from 1993 to 2001
- Jo Goodhew (born 1961), New Zealand politician
- Mary Goodhew, British ballet performer, teacher, and director
- Peter Goodhew (born 1943), British electron microscopist
- Reginald Goodhew (died 1942), British Spitfire pilot
- Victor Goodhew (1919–2006), British politician
