= LFHE =

LFHE may refer to:

- The Leadership Foundation for Higher Education
- The ICAO code for Romans Saint-Paul Airport in Romans-sur-Isère, France
