= Association for Tertiary Education Management =

- Abbreviation: ATEM
- Formation: 1975
- Type: Organisation
- Headquarters: Canberra, Australia
- Region served: Australia & New Zealand
- Members: 1,500+
- Official language: English
- Website: atem.org.au

The Association for Tertiary Education Management Inc. (ATEM Inc) is a professional body in Australasia for tertiary education administrators and managers. It was established in 1976 as the Australian Institute of Tertiary Education Administrators (AITEA), changing its name in 1996.

Its members are employed at organisations across the tertiary academic environment in Australasia, including universities, TAFE institutes, polytechnics and wanangas, private providers, government departments and other related organisations.

Currently, ATEM publishes the Journal of Higher Education Policy and Management six times annually, in collaboration with the LH Martin Institute for Higher Education Leadership and Management. ATEM collaborates with the Australasian Tertiary Education Facilities Managers Association to hold the annual Tertiary Education Management Conference at a location in Australia or New Zealand.

== Professionalism in tertiary education management ==
Full-time tertiary education administrators emerged as a distinct role in Australia from the mid-1970s, as institutions sought to deal with their increasing size and complexity, along with a broadening of their aspirations. As the professionalism of tertiary administrators has developed, there has been a corresponding push to recognise the uniqueness and validity of their role in the academic environment, led by organisations such as ATEM and the Association of University Administrators in the UK.

== Objective ==
ATEM has stated goals in this area: "ATEM works to advance the professionalisation of tertiary education management. ATEM connects, supports and challenges people, institutions and disciplines, supports them to develop their management skills and knowledge, and challenges the sector to recognise the professional nature of tertiary education management."

ATEM has four major strategic objectives:

- growing careers: growing the careers of professional administrators and managers to enable them to have rewarding careers and contribute beyond their jobs to the broader sector,
- building professionalism: building professionalism for the sector through relevant education and training, and recognising outstanding achievements in the sector,
- connecting people and groups: connecting people and groups across the sector to promote sharing of programs, knowledge and practice, and
- understanding the sector: providing programs and resources for individuals and groups to better understand the tertiary education sector.

== Constitution ==
The ATEM Constitution states that the objectives of the Association are to:

1. develop and improve the level of professional competence and practice in the field of tertiary education administration and management by providing courses, conferences, interactive websites and publications to members, non-members or those with an interest in the tertiary or higher education sectors;
2. provide professional development guidance and further the professional interests of tertiary education administrators and managers;
3. recognise in appropriate ways outstanding contributions to tertiary education administrative and management practice;
4. encourage, develop and implement educational programs and services for any persons in Australia and New Zealand either by way of ATEM providing the services or via making a donation to an educational institution which has similar educational outcomes.

== ATEM regions ==
The organisation is divided into the following six regions:

- Aotearoa
- Bass
- Central
- NSW/ACT
- Queensland
- Western

== See also ==
- Higher education
- Academic administration
- Professional development
- Association of Higher Education Professionals
