= Paul Ramsden =

British-Australian education theorist

Paul Ramsden (5 August 1948–2 August 2017) was a British-Australian education theorist known for his role as the first Chief Executive of the Higher Education Academy (2004–2010).

While at the University of Sydney, he developed the Course Experience Questionnaire. This was the model for the UK's National Student Survey.

He died in August 2017 after suffering from a pulmonary embolism.

== Works ==
- Ramsden, Paul (2003). Learning to Teach in Higher Education. London. Routledge 2nd Edition.
- Ramsden, Paul (1998). Learning to Lead in Higher Education. London. Routledge 2nd Edition.
