= History, Classics and Archaeology Subject Centre =

The Subject Centre for History, Classics and Archaeology was one of 24 Subject Centres funded within the Higher Education Academy to promote high quality learning and teaching in UK Higher Education (HE) by providing subject-based support for sharing innovations and good practices. Initially the only one of the 24 Subject Centres to be sited in Scotland, it was hosted originally by the University of Glasgow and later by the University of Liverpool. Its various Directors were Dr Andrew Roach, Dr Donald Spaeth, Colin Brooks and Dr Anthony Sinclair.

The Higher Education Academy itself came into being in 2004 through the amalgamation of the Learning and Teaching Support Network (LTSN), the Institute for the Learning and Teaching in Higher Education (ILTHE) and the Higher Education Staff Development Agency (HESDA) in order to enable comprehensive, knowledgeable support for practitioners and institutions with an aim to the greater professionalisation of HE teaching.

The Subject Centre for History, Classics and Archaeology supported teaching and learning in history, archaeology, and classics as broadly defined (the study of the languages and cultures of the Greek and Roman Worlds, including Byzantine Studies and Classical Reception Studies).

The key role of HCA was to be a "one stop shop" for the subject communities for matters relating to learning and teaching both at an individual subject level and with regard to common issues across these three Humanities disciplines. HCA did this by identifying, collecting and disseminating information and material on good practice in teaching and learning, enabling practitioners to share their experience with colleagues for mutual benefit. HCA both funded and published disciplinary specific pedagogical research (Ped Res) and development (Ped Dev) and scholarship of teaching and learning (SOTL).

The Subject Centre for History, Classics and Archaeology worked in conjunction with its various subject associations and other relevant national organisations to influence the development of policy and practice within History, Classics and Archaeology in UK higher education. It held several well-attended 3-day Teaching & Learning in History conferences annually at Lady Margaret Hall, University of Oxford.
