= Health Sciences and Practice Subject Centre =

The Subject Centre for Health Sciences and Practice is one of 24 subject centres funded within the Higher Education Academy to promote high quality learning and teaching in UK Higher Education (HE) by providing subject-based support for sharing innovations and good practices. It is hosted by King's College, London. The Director is Catherine Geissler. The centre was founded in 2000.

The Higher Education Academy itself came into being in 2004 through the amalgamation of the Learning and Teaching Support Network (LTSN), the Institute for the Learning and Teaching in Higher Education (ILTHE) and the Higher Education Staff Development Agency (HESDA) in order to enable comprehensive, knowledgeable support for practitioners and institutions with an aim to the greater professionalisation of HE teaching.

The subject centre supports teaching and learning (both in academic classroom and practice settings), in audiology, dance and movement therapy, podiatry, complementary medicine, drama therapy, health informatics, health promotion, health visiting, medical physics, medical imaging and diagnostic radiography, mental health and psychotherapy, midwifery, nursing, occupational therapy, operating department practice, orthoptics, osteopathy, palliative care, paramedic services, pharmacy, physiotherapy, public health, radiotherapy, resuscitation, and speech and language therapy. It works closely with the Medicine, Dentistry and Veterinary Medicine (MEDEV) Subject Centre. The Centres are part of the HEALTH Network Group.

The centre produces various publications and reports. It works through various Special Interest Groups including those focusing on assessment, e-learning and widening participation.
