= Association of Higher Education Professionals =

British professional body

- Founded: 1961 (MUAAS)
- Type: Professional association
- Purpose: Higher education
- Location: University of Manchester
- Origins: Conference of Higher Education Professionals, Association of Polytechnic Administrators
- Region served: Great Britain and Ireland
- Members: 2,000+
- Key people: Rachel Hill-Kelly, Chair; Keith Zimmerman, President
- Employees: 5
- Website: ahep.ac.uk

The Association of Higher Education Professionals (AHEP), formerly known as the Association of University Administrators (AUA), is the professional body for higher education administrators and managers in the United Kingdom and Republic of Ireland. As of 2023, its membership comprised over two thousand individuals, representing 300 institutions from the UK and 21 countries worldwide.

Following the passage of the Further and Higher Education Act 1992, the association was formed by the merger of the Association of Polytechnic Administrators (APA) and the Conference of University Administrators (CUA) in 1993. CUA traced its history back to the Meeting of University Academic Administrative Staff, founded in 1961. The association marked the golden jubilee of the professionalisation of support staff in UK universities in 2011. In response to the changing UK higher education sector, it adopted the current name in 2023.

== Professional values ==
AHEP exists to advance and assist in the advancement of education by fostering sound methods of leadership, management and administration in further and higher education by education, training, and other means.

AHEP members are individually and collectively committed to:

- Advancing education for public benefit through sharing professional knowledge and practice
- Developing their own and others' professional practice
- Actively championing a professional culture of equality, diversity and inclusion
- Working to the highest standards of fair, ethical and transparent professional behaviour

These values underpin the nine professional behaviours of the AHEP Professional Framework.

== Professional development ==
The AHEP Professional Framework is a tool that supports the career development of higher education professionals. It works on an organisational and individual level, for professionals at all career stages, and can be applied across all roles in the sector.

The AHEP Accreditation Scheme provides a clear path for members (entitled to the post-nominal letters MAHEP) to Accredited Membership (AMAHEP) and Fellowship (FAHEP), which recognise a deeper commitment to ongoing professional development and acknowledge the impact and influence of this on professional practice.

The AHEP Postgraduate Certificate in Higher Education Administration, Management and Leadership, delivered in partnership with Nottingham Trent University, is a self-directed, independent, work-based learning programme for higher education professionals working within UK higher education administration.

== Publications ==
The quarterly journal of the Association of Higher Education Professionals, Perspectives: Policy and Practice in Higher Education, is published by Taylor and Francis.

A series of Good Practice Guides available to members, first published by CUA in 1986, aims to share and promote best practice in HE.

== Conference ==
AHEP's annual conference and exhibition is the largest professional development conference in the UK HE calendar, with plenary and keynote presentations and around 100 working sessions.

Internationally, AHEP maintains reciprocal agreements with similar organisations, which allow members to attend partner conferences.

== Governance ==
The association is a Charitable Incorporated Organisation, managed and administered by a Board of Trustees. AHEP Enterprises is a subsidiary trading company and is the accounting body for many of the trading activities undertaken by AHEP.

Following election, the Chair-elect serves as Vice-chair of the Association for one year before taking office; upon completion of a term of office, the retiring Chair serves as Vice-chair for a further year:

Term	Chair	Occupation
1994–1996	Sally Neocosmos OBE	University Secretary, Sheffield Hallam University
1996–1998	Keith Jones	Academic Secretary, University of Liverpool
1998–2000	David Allen OBE	Registrar and Secretary, University of Birmingham
2000–2002	Alison Johns	Director of Staff Development, University of Plymouth
2002–2004	John Ryan MBE	Registrar, University College Worcester
2004–2006	Sue Holmes	Assistant Director (Estate Planning), Sheffield Hallam University
2006–2008	Dr Bruce Nelson	Academic Registrar, University of Edinburgh
2008–2010	Maureen Skinner	Registrar (Faculty of the Arts), Thames Valley University
2010–2012	Christopher Hallas	Director of Student Affairs, University of Greenwich
2012–2014	Matthew Andrews	Academic Registrar, Oxford Brookes University
2014–2016	Tessa Harrison	Director of Students and Education, King's College London
2016–2018	Kathryn Fowler	Deputy Executive Director (Aberdeen Institute of Energy), University of Aberdeen
2018–2020	Dr Chris Ince	Secretary and Registrar, London Metropolitan University
2020–2022	Amanda Oliver	Director of College Operations, Brunel University
2022–2023	Vikki Goddard	Independent Consultant, Vikki Goddard Consulting; former Director of Operations (Faculty of Biology, Medicine and Health), University of Manchester
2023-2025	Dr Thea Gibbs	Director of Operations (Faculty of Laws), University College London
2025-2027	Rachel Hill-Kelly	Assistant Company Secretary, Quality Assurance Agency for Higher Education

The Honorary President of the Association undertakes such activities as may be requested by the Board of Trustees or prescribed from time to time in the bye-laws. The Board is responsible for appointing the Honorary President in accordance with bye-laws established for that purpose:

Term	President	Occupation
2011–2015	Alison Johns	Head of Leadership, Governance and Management, Higher Education Funding Council for England
2015–2017	Prof. Ruth Farwell CBE	Former Vice Chancellor, Buckinghamshire New University
2017–2019	Mary Curnock Cook CBE	Former Chief Executive, Universities and Colleges Admissions Service
2019–2022	Dame Shirley Pearce DBE	Chair of Court and Council, London School of Economics; former Vice Chancellor, Loughborough University
2022–2024	Keith Zimmerman	Executive Director for Transformation of Education and Student Outcomes, King's College London

== See also ==
- Higher education
- Academic administration
- Professional association
- Professional development
- Association for Tertiary Education Management
