= Registrar (education) =

Official within an academic institution

A registrar is a senior administrative executive within an academic institution (consisting of a college, university, or secondary school) who oversees the management and leadership of the Registrar's Office.

== General duties and function ==
Typically, a registrar processes registration requests, schedules classes and maintains class lists, enforces the rules for entering or leaving classes, and keeps a permanent record of grades and marks. In institutions with selective admission requirements, a student only begins to be in connection with the registrar's official actions after admission. Various grades of professional academic-related staff perform senior administrative and managerial roles in such universities on behalf of the registrar or head of department and head subsections of the administration. Titles afforded to such staff include assistant registrar, senior assistant registrar and principal assistant registrar.

=== Registrars in the United Kingdom ===
In the United Kingdom, the term registrar is usually used for the head of the university's administration. The role is usually combined with that of secretary of the university's governing bodies and in these cases, the full title will often be "registrar and secretary" (or "secretary and registrar") to reflect these dual roles. The University of Cambridge in England uses the archaic spelling of "Registrary" for this office.

=== Registrars in Canada ===
In Canada, the registrar is an administrative position, usually responsible for admissions, records and registration, academic scheduling, front line service and support, strategic enrollment data management and analysis, academic policy, and graduation (sometimes known as convocation).

=== Registrars in Ireland ===
In Ireland, the registrar is usually the chief academic officer, and the title is often combined with such titles as "deputy president" or "vice-president for academic affairs".

== Registrar's office ==
A registrar's office is an essential unit within a college, university, or secondary school. The registrar's office provides a variety of services and supports for prospective students, current students, faculty, and staff related to:

- Marketing and recruitment
- Admissions
- Registration
- Graduations
- Course catalog publication
- Curriculum management
- Course scheduling
- Academic records
- Examinations
- Data analytics
- Student awards and financial aid
- Tuition billing and payments
- Athletic compliance
- Veterans’ Educational Benefits
- Mass communications

== See also ==
- Association of University Administrators
