= Leadership Foundation for Higher Education =

UK membership organisation, 2004 to 2019

- Abbreviation: Leadership Foundation
- Formation: January 2004
- Dissolved: March 2019
- Legal status: Non-profit company and registered charity no 1101959
- Purpose: Leadership in UK higher education and professional development
- Location: Peer House, 8–14 Verulam Street, Holborn, WCIX 8LZ
- Region served: UK and International
- Members: 150 universities and higher education colleges
- Chief Executive: Alison Johns
- Main organ: Board of Trustees (Chairman: Sir Andrew Cubie)
- Parent organization: Universities UK, GuildHE
- Affiliations: HEFCE, Committee of University Chairs
- Budget: £5.9m (2014/15)

The Leadership Foundation for Higher Education (LFHE) was an organisation in the United Kingdom providing support and advice on leadership, governance and management for higher education, based in Holborn, London. It was merged into Advance HE in 2018.

== History ==
The organisation was established in 2004 by Universities UK and SCOP (now known as GuildHE). It took over the function of the Higher Education Staff Development Agency, based in Ingram House in Sheffield. It was incorporated as a company in October 2003, and registered as a charity in February 2004.

In March 2018, LFHE merged with the Equality Challenge Unit and the Higher Education Academy to form Advance HE.

== Structure ==
LFHE had offices in Holborn, off the Grays Inn Road. It was funded by the four higher education funding bodies of the UK, namely the Higher Education Funding Council for England; the Scottish Funding Council; the Higher Education Funding Council for Wales; and the Department for Employment and Learning, Northern Ireland.

The Leadership Foundation was a membership organisation and in 2014–2015 there were 152 universities and higher education colleges in membership.

== Function ==
The Leadership Foundation delivered its work through programmes and events, institutional advice and consultancy, and providing research on leadership, management and governance for higher education institutions. It cooperated with a wide range of organisations and associations to do this.

== Notable people ==
- Fiona Ross, Director of Research

== See also ==
- National College for Teaching and Leadership – a similar organisation for schools
