= Fiona Ross (nurse) =

British nurse and academic

Professor Fiona Ross CBE
- Born: Fiona Mary Ross; 23 October 1951 (age 74)
- Education: University of Edinburgh; King's College, London
- Occupations: Nurse and scholar

Fiona Mary Ross, CBE (born 23 October 1951) is a British nurse and academic. She is Emerita Professor in Health and Social Care at Kingston University and an independent governor on the Westminster University Court. Formerly she was Dean at Kingston University and St George's, University of London, and also the director of research at the Leadership Foundation for Higher Education.

== Early life and education ==
Ross was born on 23 October 1951 in London, England. She was educated at James Allen's Girls' School, an all-girls private school in Dulwich, London. She studied social science and nursing at the Department of Nursing Studies, University of Edinburgh, graduating with a Bachelor of Science (BSc) degree in 1973. She later undertook postgraduate research in nursing studies at King's College, London, completing her Doctor of Philosophy (PhD) degree in 1987. Her doctoral thesis was titled "Evaluation of a drug guide in primary care".

== Career ==
Ross qualified as a registered nurse (RN) in 1975. She started her nursing career in community and palliative care, before becoming a district nurse. Her academic career began as a researcher during her district nurse days, working at St Thomas's Hospital Medical School. From 1983 to 1989, she was a lecturer in the Department of Nursing Studies of King's College, London. Having moved to St George's Hospital Medical School, she was a senior lecturer from 1990 to 1995. She was appointed Professor of Primary Care Nursing in 1996; this was the medical school's first chair in nursing.

Ross was Professor of Gerontological Nursing and the Director of the National Nursing Research Unit at King's College, London between 2002 and 2005. She joined Kingston University and St George's, University of London in 2006 as Executive Dean of the Faculty of Health and Social Care. She was an expert advisor on the Prime Minister's independent commission into nursing and midwifery that published the Front Line Care (Report) in 2010. In 2014, she took up two part-time posts: as director of research at the Leadership Foundation for Higher Education (LFHE), and as Professor of Health Research at Kingston University and St George's, University of London. She stepped down from her role at the LFHE in 2017.

== Honours ==
In the 2015 New Year Honours, Ross was appointed a Commander of the Order of the British Empire (CBE) "for services to nursing". She is a Fellow of the Queen's Nursing Institute, and a Fellow of the European Academy of Nursing Sciences.

== Personal life ==
In 1982, Ross married John C. Tatam. Together they have three children: one daughter and two sons and three grandchildren.

== Selected works ==
- Redfern, Sally J.; Ross, Fiona M., eds. (1999). Nursing Older People (3rd ed.). Edinburgh: Churchill Livingstone. ISBN 978-0443058745.
- Redfern, Sally J.; Ross, Fiona M., eds. (2006). Nursing Older People (4th ed.). Edinburgh: Churchill Livingstone. ISBN 978-0443074592.
- Morrow, Elizabeth; Boaz, Annette; Brearley, Sally; Ross, Fiona (2012). Handbook of User Involvement in Nursing and Healthcare Research. Chichester: John Wiley & Sons. ISBN 978-1444334722.
- Fook, Jan; Collington, Val; Ross, Fiona; Ruch, Gillian; West, Linden, eds. (2015). Researching Critical Reflection: Multidisciplinary Perspectives. London: Routledge. ISBN 978-1138825178.
- Ross, Fiona; Woodfield, Steve (January 2017). "Mutuality, Metaphor and Micropolitics in Collaborative Governance: a Joint Venture in UK Higher Education" (PDF). Higher Education Quarterly. 71 (1): 33–52. doi:10.1111/hequ.12110.
- Morrow, Elizabeth M.; Goreham, Helen; Ross, Fiona (16 October 2017). "Exploring research impact in the assessment of leadership, governance and management research". Evaluation. 23 (4): 407–431. doi:10.1177/1356389017730726. S2CID 148951728.

Sims S, Fletcher S, Brearley S, Ross F, Manthorpe J, Harris R. What does Success Look Like for Leaders of Integrated Health and Social Care Systems? a Realist Review. International Journal of Integrated Care, 2021; 21(4): 26, 1–17. DOI: https://doi.org/10.5334/ijic.5936
