= Subject Network for Sociology, Anthropology, Politics =

The Subject Network for Sociology, Anthropology, Politics of the Higher Education Academy of the United Kingdom was established in 2000 to support and enhance learning and teaching in performing arts higher education across the UK. It is based at the University of Birmingham. The director is Professor Alasdair Blair.
