= Mary Curnock Cook =

- Born: 10 October 1958 (age 68)
- Education: London Business School
- Occupation: Independent educationalist
- Employer(s): Universities and Colleges Admissions Service, Qualifications and Curriculum Development Agency

Mary Curnock Cook CBE (born 10 October 1958) is a British educationalist who was chief executive of the Universities and Colleges Admissions Service and director of Qualifications and Skills at the Qualifications and Curriculum Development Agency. She is a non-executive director of the Student Loans Company.

== Life ==
Cook left school at sixteen and took a job as a secretary at International Biochemicals. She was promoted in time to the position of director of International Sales and Marketing.

She later became a Sloan Fellow. Considered one of the most prestigious management training programmes in the world, it targets experienced leaders who have demonstrated success either within organisations or independently, as entrepreneurs. She was awarded a master's degree from the London Business School in 2001.

In 2000, Cook was appointed an Officer of the Order of the British Empire (OBE) for assisting in training within the hospitality industry.

Whilst CEO of UCAS, Cook joined the debate about discrimination against men in education. Commenting on a study by her own organisation, she was quoted as asking: "has the women's movement now become so normalised that we cannot conceive of needing to take positive action to secure equal education outcomes for boys?"

She stood down as the CEO of UCAS in 2017, and was honorary president of the Association of University Administrators until 2019.

== Awards ==
Cook is an honorary Fellow of Birkbeck College and Goldsmiths' College, independent member institutions of the University of London. She has an honorary doctorate from the University of Gloucestershire.

Cook was promoted to Commander of the Order of the British Empire (CBE) in the 2020 Birthday Honours for services to further and higher education.
