= Jean Nehr =

French actor (1929–2023)

- Born: 12 June 1929; Douai, France
- Died: 2 January 2023 (aged 93); Aix-en-Provence, France
- Occupation: Actor

Jean Nehr (12 June 1929 – 2 January 2023) was a French actor.

== Biography ==
Jean Nehr died in Aix-en-Provence on 2 January 2023, at the age of 93.

== Filmography ==
=== Television ===
- The Investigations of Commissioner Maigret (1967)
- The Aeronauts (1969)
- L'Hiver d'un gentilhomme (1974)
- The Investigations of Commissioner Maigret (1978)
- Les Coeurs brûlés (1992)
- Docteur Sylvestre (1996)
- Le Miroir de l'eau (2004)
- Plus belle la vie: season 1 (2005)
- Le Tuteur (2006)
- Vive les vacances ! (2009)
- Enquêtes réservées: season 3 (2010)
- Caïn: season 1 (2012)
- Caïn: season 3 (2015)
- Marjorie (2017)
- Plus belle la vie: season 16 (2020)

=== Telefilms ===
- The Investigations of Commissioner Maigret (1979)
- Cinéma 16 (1981–1987)
- La Controverse de Valladolid (1992)
- La Bastide blanche (1997)
- Eaux troubles (2004)
- 93, rue Lauriston (2004)
- L'Affaire Christian Ranucci : Le Combat d'une mère (2006)
- Meurtres à La Ciotat (2016)
- Imposture (2017)

=== Cinema ===
- Doux amer (1989)
- Hercule et Sherlock (1996)
- Summer of '62 (2007)
- Marseille (2016)
