= Higher Education Funding Council for England =

UK non-departmental public body

- HEFCE

Agency overview
- Formed: 1992
- Preceding agency: Universities Funding Council, Polytechnics and Colleges Funding Council (1988–92)
- Dissolved: 2018
- Superseding agency: Office for Students (OfS) and United Kingdom Research and Innovation (UKRI)
- Type: Non-departmental public body
- Jurisdiction: England
- Headquarters: Nicholson House, Lime Kiln Close, Stoke Gifford, Bristol, BS34 8SR
- Employees: c.260
- Annual budget: £3.5 bn (2016–17)
- Minister responsible: Jo Johnson, Minister of State for Universities and Science
- Agency executives: Professor Madeleine Atkins, chief executive; Sir Tim Melville-Ross, Chairman
- Parent agency: Department for Education
- Website: www.hefce.ac.uk

The Higher Education Funding Council for England (HEFCE) was a non-departmental public body in the United Kingdom, which was responsible for the distribution of funding for higher education to universities and further education colleges in England since 1992. It ceased to exist as of 1 April 2018, when its duties were divided between the newly created Office for Students and Research England (operating within United Kingdom Research and Innovation).

Most universities are charities and HEFCE (rather than the Charity Commission for England and Wales) was their principal regulator. HEFCE therefore had the duty to promote compliance with charity law by the universities for which it was responsible.

== History ==
HEFCE was created by the Further and Higher Education Act 1992 (which also created the Further Education Funding Council for England (FEFC), replaced in 2001 by the Learning and Skills Council).

On 1 June 2010 HEFCE became the principal regulator of those higher education institutions in England that are 'exempt charities'. This followed the Charities Act 2006, according to which all charities should be subject to regulation.

The Higher Education and Research Act 2017 directed that HEFCE should be replaced by a new body, the Office for Students, also incorporating the Office for Fair Access (OFFA), but with HEFCE's research funding functions reassigned to UK Research and Innovation.

=== Chief Executives ===
- Prof Madeleine Atkins (2014–2018)
- Sir Alan Langlands (2009–2013)
- Prof David Eastwood (2006–2009)
- Sir Howard Newby (2001–2006)
- Sir Brian Fender (1995–2001)
- Sir Graeme Davies (1992–1995)

== Structure ==
HEFCE staff worked within six directorates. Leadership for these key strategic areas was shared between the Chief Executive and directors.

=== Management ===
The chief executive of HEFCE was Professor Madeleine Atkins (since 1 January 2014), previously Vice-Chancellor of the University of Coventry. Her predecessor, Sir Alan Langlands, was the Vice-Chancellor of the University of Leeds.

== Function ==
In 2017–2018 HEFCE allocated £3.5 billion in public funds from the UK Government to universities and colleges in England to 'invest on behalf of students and the public to promote excellence and innovation in research, teaching and knowledge exchange'. It only funds the institutions and does not give grants or loans to individual students. It also helps develop and implement higher education policy, based on research and consultation.

=== Charity regulation ===
HEFCE was the legal 'principal regulator' for the many UK universities and colleges who are classed as exempt charities. HEFCE described its role as 'to promote compliance by charity trustees with their legal obligations in exercising control and management of the administration of the charity' and has a memorandum of understanding with the Charity Commission that details how the two will work together.

=== Industry-academia links ===
In addition to distributing both teaching and research funding to higher education institutions HEFCE was also involved with: widening participation; developing links between higher education institutions and business and the community; and enhancing leadership, governance and management within the sector. It provided both a contribution to core funding, and ring-fenced funding for special initiatives, projects and strategic aims.

=== Prevent duty ===
The Government delegated to HEFCE the responsibility for overseeing the Prevent duty, which obliged relevant higher education bodies to have due regard to the need to prevent people from being drawn into terrorism. HEFCE monitored whether these bodies were carrying out the duty effectively, and reports findings back to providers and the Government on a regular basis.

=== Register of Higher Education Providers ===
HEFCE administered the Register of Higher Education Providers, a searchable tool that shows how the Government regulates higher education providers in England. This is primarily a regulatory tool, which lists each provider's names and addresses, its powers and the standards it is required to meet, among other information useful to other regulators and Government agencies.

=== Unistats ===
HEFCE also owned the Unistats website which includes the student satisfaction ratings for different universities and subjects. These satisfaction ratings are compiled from the National Student Survey, and the feedback from students is held within the Unistats website and allows students to compare subjects, universities and UCAS points, see satisfaction ratings from other students and see what the employment prospects are for graduate jobs by subject chosen.

== Teaching initiatives ==
=== Higher Education Academy ===
The Higher Education Academy (HEA), founded in May 2004, is funded by the UK HE Funding Councils (including HEFCE) and institutional subscriptions. It was established as the result of a merger of the Institute for Learning and Teaching in Higher Education (ILTHE), the Learning and Teaching Support Network (LTSN), and the TQEF National Co-ordination Team (NCT).

=== National Teaching Fellowship Scheme ===
HEFCE also funded a National Teaching Fellowship (NTF) scheme for those working in England and Northern Ireland. The initiative is administered by the HEA and has two separate strands providing individual awards – recognising individual excellence in teaching within the Higher Education sector – and awards for large-scale projects typically undertaken by Higher Education institutions over periods of up to three years.

=== Discontinued initiatives ===
- The Centres for Excellence in Teaching and Learning initiative aimed to reward and invest in excellent teaching practice. It was HEFCE's largest ever single funding initiative in teaching and learning, providing £350 million to 74 centres over a five-year period.
- The Higher Education Innovation Fund.
- The Fund for the Development of Teaching and Learning was established to stimulate good teaching and learning practice in Higher Education. Over 164 projects were given awards.
- The Teaching and Learning Research Programme aimed to promote excellent educational research designed to enhance learning.
- The Online Learning Task Force aimed to maintain and develop the position of UK higher education as a world leader in online learning.

== Criticism ==
The journal Nanotechnology Perceptions expressed doubt about the ability of HEFCE to effectively regulate the universities for which it was responsible, suggesting that while it would have the power to impose financial penalties on universities engaging in dishonest practice, there was no indication that it was prepared to do so.

== See also ==
- Higher Education Funding Council for Wales
- Higher Education Statistics Agency (based in Cheltenham)
- Jisc
- Research Councils UK
- Research Excellence Framework
- Scottish Funding Council
- UCAS
