= Postgraduate Certificate in Higher Education =

British qualification

The Postgraduate Certificate in Higher Education (PGCHE), alternatively called the Postgraduate Certificate in Academic Practice (PGCAP), is a British teaching qualification for university lecturers and similar professionals. The PGCHE is designed to equip holders with the skills needed to provide high-quality teaching and learning. PGCHE courses are usually closely aligned with the Higher Education Academy's Professional Standards Framework (UKPSF), with successful completion of an HEA-accredited postgraduate certificate leading to formal professional recognition as an HEA fellow (FHEA).

The PGCHE, like most UK postgraduate certificates, is an advanced postgraduate qualification, taught and assessed at the level of a UK master's-degree. The certificate is typically made up of 60 credits (1/3 of a full academic year), compared to the 180 credits (full academic year) required for a full MEd or MA degree. The duration of the programme for new, full-time members of staff is generally up to two years. PGCHE courses do not in themselves equip holders with knowledge of their specialist subject areas, and a university teacher will also have an appropriate educational and experiential background, typically including a PhD.

The PGCHE began to become widespread after the Dearing Report recommended that all university teachers should achieve an appropriate level of professional recognition during the initial stages of their career.

The names PGCHE and PGCAP are used by the Higher Education Academy but there are variations: several UK universities offer the 'Postgraduate Certificate in Learning and Teaching in Higher Education' (or variations on the theme). Course content and learning outcomes can vary in detail, though alignment with UKPSF and accreditation by the Higher Education Academy are common themes.

== See also ==
- Dearing Report
- Higher Education Academy
- Postgraduate Certificate in Education
- UK Professional Standards Framework (higher education)
