= Emilia Vosnesenskaya =

Emilia Ivanovna Vosnesenskaya
- Born: 12 February 1928; Tsarskoe Selo, Russia
- Died: 27 December 2015 (aged 87); Edinburgh, UK

Emilia Ivanovna "Emmie" Vosnesenskaya (12 February 1928 – 27 December 2015) was a Russian-born British lecturer in Russian language at the University of Edinburgh.

== Early life ==
Vosnesenskaya was born in Tsarskoe Selo in the Soviet Union, on 12 February 1928; both her parents were geneticists. Her father Ivan Filippovich was arrested in 1938 and later executed. With her mother Clavdia Petrovna Vosnesenskaya, she left the Soviet Union after the German invasion. After working in a tuberculosis hospital and then in a maternity hospital, she attended university in the UK.

== Work ==
Vosnesenskaya taught Russian at the Joint Services School for Linguists. She became a naturalised British citizen on 1 January 1957, at which point she was an Assistant University Lecturer. She moved to the University of Edinburgh in 1956 and taught there until her retirement. She contributed to the BBC series Keep Up Your Russian, and associated grammar booklet, in 1960.
