= EIFA International School London =

Coordinates: 51°31′12″N 0°08′40″W

EIFA International School London L'Ecole Internationale Franco-Anglaise
- 36 Portland Place, W1B 1LS

Information
- School type: International French-English Bilingual School
- Established: 2013
- Founders: Sabine Fischer-Dehon and Isabelle Faulkner
- Department for Education URN: 139239 Tables
- Head of school: Stéphane Kuhn
- Gender: Co-educational
- Age range: 2 to 14 years old
- International students: circa 250 from 40 nationalities
- Website: www.eifaschool.com

EIFA International School, formerly known as L'Ecole Internationale Franco-Anglaise, is an English-French international co-educational nursery, junior and middle independent day school, located in Marylebone, London.

EIFA is a school for children from Pre-Nursery to Year 9. Its curriculum is accredited by the Mission Laïque Française and the French National Ministry of Education and it is overseen by the French National Ministry of Education. EIFA is inspected by OFSTED and the French Inspecteur des Ecoles du Ministère de l’Education Nationale.

EIFA is situated in Marylebone, London, catering for local and international families.

== History ==
EIFA opened its doors in January 2013 in a temporary building situated at 55 Harley Street, London. Its first pupil intake was 23 children from Nursery to Year 6. The school then moved in May 2013 into its current building at 36 Portland Place, London. By September 2013, the school grew to 130 pupils. In September 2015, EIFA expanded its offering to a Senior School from Year 7 to Year 11, then housed again in a temporary building at 126 Harley Street, London. The Senior School was then moved in April 2016 to its current premises in Duchess House. With the addition of the IB Diploma Programme, the Senior School goes up to Year 13.

EIFA extended its offering to a day nursery in September 2016 and named it “Little EIFA”. The 36 Portland Place premises is home to Little EIFA.

== Curriculum ==
From Nursery to Year 6, each class has two form teachers: a native qualified English teacher and a native French qualified teacher who work as a team. They teach the French National Curriculum which is enriched with elements from the National Curriculum for England. The combined two curricula provide a bilingual programme that marries academic rigour with cultural, artistic and humanitarian enrichment. The language of instruction is equally dispensed in both English and French.

From Year 7 to Year 9 in Middle School, subjects are taught equally in French and English. In its recent 2024 inspection, EIFA was awarded “Good” by OFSTED.

== Demographics ==
In 2024, EIFA counted over 250 pupils. EIFA's pupils and staff come from 40 countries and there are over 30 languages spoken at the school.
