= Loredana Polezzi =

British literary critic

- Awards: Fellow of the Learned Society of Wales

Academic background
- Education: Università degli Studi di Siena (BA); University of Warwick (MA, PhD)

Academic work
- Discipline: literary critic
- Institutions: Stony Brook University, University of Warwick, Cardiff University

Loredana Polezzi FLSW is a literary critic and Alfonse M. D’Amato Chair in Italian American ad Italian Studies at Stony Brook University. She previously taught at the University of Warwick and Cardiff University. She is known for her work on contemporary Italian travel writing and is the current Co-Editor with Sue-Ann Harding and Rita Wilson of the journal The Translator.

== Works ==
- C. Burdett and L. Polezzi (eds), Transnational Italian Studies (Liverpool: Liverpool University Press, 2020)
- L. Polezzi and E. Di Piazza (eds), special issue on ‘Travel Writing and the Shape of the World’, Textus, XXV: 2(May–December 2012)
- L. Polezzi and S. Ouditt (eds), ‘Travel Writing and Italy’, special issue of Studies in Travel Writing, 16:2 (June 2012)
- L. Polezzi and C. Ross (eds), In Corpore: Bodies in Post-Unification Italy (Madison: Fairleigh Dickinson, 2007)
- L. Polezzi (ed.), ‘Translation, Travel, Migration’, special issue of The Translator, 12:2 (Autumn 2006)
- J. Burns and L. Polezzi (eds), Borderlines: Migrazioni e identità nel Novecento (Isernia: Cosmo Iannone Editore, 2003)
- L. Polezzi, Translating Travel: Contemporary Italian Travel Writing in English Translation, Studies in European Cultural Transition, 12 (Aldershot & Brookfield: Ashgate, 2001)
- R. di Napoli, L. Polezzi, A. King (eds), Fuzzy Boundaries? Modern Languages and the Humanities (London: CILT, 2001)
