= UK Centre for Materials Education =

The UK Centre for Materials Education (UKCME) was one of 24 subject centres within the Higher Education Academy (HEA). It supported teaching and learning in Materials Science and related disciplines. The centre was established in 2000 as part of the Learning and Teaching Support Network (LTSN), later subsumed within the HEA. It was directed from its inception by Professor Peter Goodhew and ceased operating in 2010.

The centre was based at the University of Liverpool and worked with individual academics, departments, professional bodies, employers and students to develop and share excellent practice that would enhance the learning experience.

The Centre funded and supported programmes to develop and evaluate innovative approaches to teaching Materials Science. The centre also maintained an extensive database of resources relevant to materials education. Lecturers could find material to use in their teaching, whilst students would find items to help support their learning. The database also included resources on the processes of learning and teaching for those wishing to further develop their approach.
