= Economics Network =

The Economics Network (UK) is one of the subject networks originally established by the Higher Education Academy (HEA) (UK). On its founding it was known as the Learning and Teaching Support Network (LTSN) for Economics later becoming independent of the HEA.

== Aims ==
It has as its aims the improvement of learning and teaching in economics in the UK's higher education. It lists its strategic aims as:

1. Identifying, developing and disseminating evidence-informed approaches.
2. Brokering and encouraging the sharing and implementation of effective practice and innovation.
3. Supporting individual staff, departments and institutions in initiating and responding to change.
4. Informing, influencing and interpreting policy.
5. Celebrating and raising the status of teaching.
6. Operate a dynamic, highly participatory working environment that supports effective management, delivery and monitoring.

== Notable activities ==
In March 2015 the Economics Network (supported by the Royal Economic Society (UK)) held a notable conference on "Revisiting the State of Economics Education" as a follow-up to the conference at the Bank of England in 2012 on economics teaching and the financial crisis.

== Publications ==
- International Review of Economics Education
