= French Radio London =

French Radio London - FRL

London; England
- Broadcast area: Greater London
- Frequency: Online

Programming
- Language: French

History
- First air date: 17 November 2010

Technical information
- Transmitter coordinates: 51.5142954°N 0.1401677°W

Links
- Webcast: radioplayer
- Website: link

French Radio London (FRL) was a commercial radio station located in London and broadcasting to the Greater London Area on the Internet. Launched in November 2010, was the only UK based French speaking terrestrial radio station. It aimed to provide a cultural link for the French-speaking community in London. Its slogan was "The French Voice of London" or "La voix Française de Londres".

Until 2017 the chief executive was Pascal Grierson, who has previous radio experience with GWR.

FRL presenters included Rachel Bourlier (Rachel&Co talk-show), Eric Gendry (La Newsroom), Maia Morgensztern (Culture FRL), Marie Dosiere (Balade Chromatique) and Frank McWeeny (French Toast).

== FRL's audience ==
As for the editorial prospect, FRL's audience is divided between French listeners and francophiles. At the beginning of 2015, the audience of FRL grew to 100,000 listeners per week.

== Presenters ==
Rachel Bourlier, Marie Dosiere, Eric Gendry, Maïa Morgensztern, Marie Lahetjuzan, Laurent Pastor, Frank McWeeny, Laurent Shark, Antoine Ecalle, Eric Coudert, Olivier Jauffrit, Parris.

== Shows ==
Rachel & Co
This talk show presented by Rachel Bourlier invites French or foreign guests to discusses economic and social issues, international and French politics, as well as news from the worlds of cinema, music, theatre, sports and many others ...

La Newsroom
In this show, Éric Gendry takes a look at the news in France and the United Kingdom by deciphering interviews and reports. The Newsroom also aims to create links within the French community in London by including columns about life in the English capital and by interacting with listeners.

Culture FRL
The cultural programme produced and presented by Maïa Morgensztern that takes you to the Art scene, in its myriad forms. Discover each week the guests who make or break the world of culture and catch up with the current debate questions, previews of films, latest music trends and the designers to watch out for...

Le Labo des Saviors
Along with visiting researchers in our studios, Guillaume Mésière provides reports, documentaries, chronicles and an assortment of sounds to help activate of your synapses.

Balade Chromatique
Marie Dosière helps us discover unique musical styles from a particular era based on her inspirations as a fan and musician, accompanied by a specialist on the subject.

Paris Chanson
Close your eyes and be transported instantly to the heart of 1940s and 50s Paris.

Spotlight
French Radio London is proud to promote the living French culture and art in all its forms with the French and Francophile community in London. Spotlight highlights French entrepreneurs who live and succeed in London.
