= Routes into Languages =

Project promoting the study of languages

The Routes into Languages project is a consortium of universities working together with schools and colleges to promote the study of languages.

The Routes brand and the activities associated with Routes into Languages are managed by the University Council of Modern Languages (UCML), a sector-wide association representing modern languages in the United Kingdom.

== History of Routes into Languages (2006-2019) ==
Routes into Languages (RiL) was an initiative funded between 2006 and 2016 by the Higher Education Funding Council for England to promote the take-up of languages through cooperation between universities, schools and colleges in England. It was managed by the University of Southampton working with nine regional networks across the country. By the end of the funding period, this consortium network of 67 universities across England was working with some 2,300 schools and 87,000 young people, with a focus on those from less advantaged backgrounds.

From 2016, some of the original Routes consortia continued working with local schools, running a range of regional events and a highly successful Student Language Ambassador scheme. They operated under the custodianship of Universities UK International (UUKi) which worked with stakeholders within the modern languages community to transfer the ownership of the Routes brand and consortia to a sector-wide HE modern languages body.

== Routes into Languages Cymru ==
Routes into Languages Cymru, in Wales, is currently funded by a group of Welsh Universities, the four Welsh regional education consortia, and the British Council. Routes Cymru supports the uptake and visibility of modern languages in schools across Wales and is organised around two hubs located in the Schools of Modern Languages at Cardiff University and Bangor University. To date, its focus has been on delivering and supporting schools-based activities intended to generate enthusiasm and interest in modern languages, above all in the secondary school sector, also moving to digital support and online promotion.
