= Institute for Learning and Teaching in Higher Education =

The Institute for Learning and Teaching in Higher Education (ILT) was a UK organisation set up as "the professional body for higher education staff involved in teaching and the support of learning". It was founded in 2000 as a result of the reports of the National Committee of Inquiry into Higher Education (the "Dearing Report").

The ILT was located on York Science Park. The founding Chief Executive was Paul Clark.

Its stated aims were to:

- accredit programmes of learning in higher education
- commission research and development in learning and teaching practices
- stimulate innovation

In May 2004 the ILT merged with the Learning and Teaching Support Network (LTSN), and the TQEF National Co-ordination Team (NCT) to form the Higher Education Academy.
