= Advance HE =

British educational charity

- Abbreviation: AHE / HEA
- Formation: 14 October 2003; 23 years ago
- Registration no.: 1101607 (Charity); 04931031 (Company)
- Legal status: Nonprofit company Registered charity
- Purpose: Application of research in UK higher education, and co-operation between departments
- Headquarters: York Science Park, Heslington, York, England
- Region served: United Kingdom
- Members: 40,000
- Official language: English
- Parent organization: Universities UK; GuildHE
- Website: www.advance-he.ac.uk
- Formerly called: Higher Education Academy (2003–2018)

Advance HE (formerly the Higher Education Academy) is a British charity and professional membership scheme promoting excellence in higher education. It advocates evidence-based teaching methods and awards fellowships as professional recognition for university teachers. Founded in 2003, the Higher Education Academy was responsible for the UK Professional Standards Framework for higher education practitioners and merged (with the Leadership Foundation for Higher Education and Equality Challenge Unit) to form Advance HE on 21 March 2018.

== History ==
Despite Higher Education involvement in teacher training, University Lecturers have not required any formal qualifications beyond demonstrating (usually through publications and a higher degree, such as a doctorate), expert subject knowledge. The merits of professional teaching qualifications for University Lecturers became an issue for debate during the later twentieth century.

=== Institute for Learning and Teaching in Higher Education (2000–2004) ===
The Dearing Report (1997) recommended the establishment of a professional body for Lecturers that would define standards and accredit training for university teaching and that, during their probationary periods, all new Lecturers should be required to achieve 'at least associate membership' of the new Institute. The Institute for Learning and Teaching in Higher Education was founded in 2000.

=== Higher Education Academy (2003–2018) ===
In January 2003, a committee (established by HEFCE, Universities UK and the Standing Conference of Principals) recommended the establishment of a single central body responsible for standards of teaching in higher education. Subsequently, the Higher Education Academy was formed (2003) by the merging of the Institute for Learning and Teaching in Higher Education, Learning and Teaching Support Network and National Coordination Team for the Teaching Quality Enhancement Fund. The Academy became a registered company in October 2003 and charity in January 2004. In February 2004, the Minister for Higher Education, Alan Johnson, announced to Parliament that the first Chief executive of the Academy would be Paul Ramsden.

The Bell Review recommended a single sector agency for equality and diversity, learning and teaching, and leadership and governance in higher education. Consequently, the Academy merged with the Leadership Foundation for Higher Education and the Equality Challenge Unit to form Advance HE on 21 March 2018.

== Aims and purpose ==
Advance HE has stated its overall aim:

Our mission, as stated in our Strategic Plan 2012–2016, is to use our expertise and resources to support the higher education community in order to enhance the quality and impact of learning and teaching. We do this by recognising and rewarding excellent teaching, bringing together people and resources to research and share best practice, and by helping to influence, shape and implement policy.

Advance HE devised a particular set of standards for university teaching (the 'UK Professional Standards Framework'), conferring professional recognition on academics who have met these standards, and runs the UK's annual National Teaching Fellowship awards. It also provides many online resources, some discipline-specific and some more generic, and organises workshops, seminars and journals on matters of interest. The HEA has a 'policy think-tank' and is engaged in research into teaching and learning, e.g. exploring the applicability of 'grade point average' schemes to the UK.

=== Professional Standards Framework (PSF) ===
The Professional Standards Framework (PSF) for teaching and supporting learning in higher education is a voluntary scheme for describing the competences and values expected of university teaching staff in the UK. The scheme consists of four "descriptors" corresponding to different roles in higher education, and defines the areas of activity, core knowledge and professional values expected at each level. The UKPSF was developed by AdvanceHE and the descriptors correspond to the levels in HEA's professional recognition scheme.

The introduction of national professional standards for university teachers was one of the higher education reforms proposed in the DfES white paper "The Future of Higher Education" (2003) which outlined plans to introduce new standards and ensure that all new university teaching staff achieved a qualification that met them. These would be the responsibility of a new "centre of excellence" in the form of a "teaching quality academy". The Higher Education Academy was formed and commissioned by the UK's education funding councils and Universities UK to develop new standards which became known as the "UK Professional Standards Framework" or "UKPSF".

The framework has two elements: the "descriptors" (describing higher education roles and associated competences), and the "dimensions of practice" (describing the activities, core knowledge and professional values expected of practitioners). There are four descriptors corresponding to support staff with minor teaching duties, full academics (e.g. lecturers), senior academics with teaching specialisms, and senior management with strategic responsibility for teaching. The descriptors correspond to the four grades within the HEA's professional recognition scheme and academic staff are usually expected to demonstrate that they meet the second descriptor during their probationary period. The framework is used to accredit training schemes for university teachers such as the Postgraduate Certificate in Higher Education (PGCHE) and the Postgraduate Certificate in Academic Practice (PGCAP).

=== Gender Equality and Athena SWAN (2005) ===
Advance HE manage the Athena Swan Charter framework (established in 2005) which is used to support gender equality within higher education and research.

In June 2022, Advance HE announced it would change its guidelines that ask universities to commit to "collective understanding that individuals have the right to determine their own gender identity and tackling the specific issues faced by trans and non-binary people". Academics at the University of Cambridge had refused to comply; Arif Ahmed, reader in philosophy, said: "A university should absolutely not be ‘fostering collective understanding’ on controversial issues but encouraging open debate."

== Fellowships ==
=== Fellowships of the HEA and professional recognition ===
The Fellowship of the Higher Education Academy (FHEA) is a professional recognition commonly pursued by academics after completing a Doctoral Degree and gaining experience in higher education teaching and learning. Awarded through Advance HE in the UK, FHEA acknowledges an individual's commitment to teaching excellence, student learning, and professional practice in higher education. While it is a highly respected and internationally recognized academic teaching credential, it is not generally considered the highest academic qualification; rather, it is a distinguished professional recognition of teaching expertise and educational leadership.

Advance HE operates a professional recognition scheme for university teachers who have demonstrated that their teaching practices are well-aligned with the UKPSF. This is intended both to encourage excellence in teaching and provide academics with a portable qualification transferable between institutions.

There are four grades. Associate Fellow represents the minimum level of competence expected of any university teacher. Fellow represents the higher level required in an established academic post. These grades can be awarded on the basis of an assessed portfolio (containing a candidate's statement and supporting references) or on completion of an accredited course such as a PGCHE or PGCAP. Senior Fellow and Principal Fellow represent significant leadership in the promotion of teaching excellence, and are only awarded on the basis of an assessed portfolio.

== Funding ==
The Academy was funded by grants from four higher education funding bodies in the UK (HEFCE, SFC, HEFCW and DELNI), subscriptions from higher education institutions, and grant/contract income for organised initiatives. It is owned by the representative bodies of the higher education sector – Universities UK and GuildHE (formerly known as the Standing Conference of Principals).

== Historical Activities: Subject Centres ==
The Academy incorporated "Subject Centres" to share best practices in specific disciplines (2003–12). These were based around the UK at relevant university faculties (until they closed on 1 January 2012).

== See also ==
- Dearing Report
- Universities UK
- GuildHE
- UK Professional Standards Framework (higher education)
- Postgraduate Certificate in Higher Education
- Postgraduate Certificate in Academic Practice
