= Chris Cobb =

British computer scientist and academic administrator, University of London

Chris Cobb (born c. 1964) is a British computer scientist and pro vice-chancellor, chief operating officer at the University of London. He has been pro vice-chancellor at University of Roehampton, London, England and prior to that was at London School of Economics. In 2020, he was appointed as chief executive of the Associated Board of the Royal Schools of Music, despite not having any professional background in music.

== Life and work ==
Cobb received his degree in business and computing in the late 1980s, and started his career at the London School of Economics and Political Science (LSE) as an analyst programmer, and later becoming Director of business systems and services in 1996. In 2005 he was appointed pro vice-chancellor at Roehampton University, and in 2011 back at the University of London, he became chief operating officer and university secretary. He was promoted to pro vice-chancellor in 2014.

Cobb taught university IT management on the ESMU – HUMANE Winter School for Senior University Administrators and has undertaken JISC funded research in the use of IT in Chinese Universities as part of the Leadership Foundation for Higher Education Sino-UK exchange programme.

Previously, Cobb was a member of the AHUA National Executive (2014–2016) where he led in liaison with Jisc and Universities UK on cybersecurity. He has sat on a number of national working groups relating to IT in Higher Education, including the Jisc Organisation Support Committee, Board membership of JISC infoNet. and chairing the Universities and Colleges Information Systems Association (UCISA) CISG between 2003 and 2005. He also chaired a Universities and Colleges Admissions Service (UCAS) working group investigating improvements to the recruitment and admittance of part-time students into Higher Education.

Cobb is an advocate of sharing services across universities and speaks regularly on the advantages of efficiency, quality and cost. He has been awarded several grants to develop new services and was a member of the Higher Education Funding Council for England (HEFCE) Shared Services working group. He now chairs Co Sector Ltd, the University of London's shared services organisation.

Cobb provides consultancy to other universities on the use of IT and in 2008 (on behalf of the European University Association) provided advice on the integration on IT infrastructure and systems for the merger of four universities in Strasbourg; Louis Pasteur University, Robert Schuman University, Marc Bloch University and l'Institut Universitaire de Formation des Maîtres d'Alsace. In 2008 Cobb led a successful funding bid from the JISC to experiment in the use of enterprise architecture within a university context with the specific aim of developing a service-oriented architecture to systems integration and thus enabling greater accessibility to shared services. This project concluded in mid-2010. In 2013 Cobb is involved in developing the University of London into a "significant provider of shared services to higher education". Cobb participated in the Ian Diamond Efficiency Reviews and regularly speaks on University Efficiency.

Between 2011 and 2020, Cobb was a contributor to Times Higher Education, writing on cybersecurity, international student recruitment, and a legal dispute between the Warburg Institute and the University of London. In a 2014 article, Cobb called for universities to be exempt from the Freedom of Information Act 2000, on the grounds that universities are not public authorities, though they do receive public funding.

He is a judge on the Times Higher Education Awards and the Times Higher Education Leadership and Management Awards and is on the National Executive Committee of the Association of Heads of University Administration. He is elected Fellow of the Royal Society of Arts. He is also a Freeman of the Worshipful Company of Information Technologists and the City of London. He is a member of Oracle Education and Research Strategy Council. In 2020-21 he served as Interim Director of Goodenough College. At one point, he served as Chair of the Leadership Foundation's Integrated Reporting Advisory Group. In addition, he is a member of the HESA Data Futures Group and a member of the Emerge Education HE Growth Board. and also a member of the HUMANE Roundtable. In 2019 he was a member of the Financial Sustainability Strategy Group.

== Controversy ==
In December 2013 the University of London obtained a court order that banned sit-in protests by students in the area around Senate House in Holborn for six months. As Chief Operating Officer, Cobb came under fire from student activists and left-wing politicians for his handling of these protests, and in an early day motion in the House of Commons, George Galloway described Cobb as being "nakedly mendacious" for saying that the University supported peaceful protest.

== Selected publications ==
- Chris Cobb. "New approaches to technology in HE management." Perspectives: Policy and Practice in Higher Education 16.4 (2012): 136–145.
