= Digital heritage =

Use of digital information for cultural and historical research

Digital Heritage Documentation Initiative

The Charter on the Preservation of Digital Heritage of UNESCO defines digital heritage as embracing "cultural, educational, scientific and administrative resources, as well as technical, legal, medical and other kinds of information created digitally, or converted into digital form from existing analogue resources".

Digital heritage also includes the use of digital media in the service of understanding and preserving cultural or natural heritage.

The digitization of both cultural heritage and Natural heritage serves to enable the permanent access of current and future generations to culturally important objects ranging from literature and paintings to flora, fauna, or habitats. It is also used in the preservation and access of objects with enduring or significant historical, scientific, or cultural value, including buildings, archaeological sites, and natural phenomena. The main idea is the transformation of a material object into a virtual copy. It should not be confused with digital humanities, which uses digitizing technology to specifically help with research. There have been several debates concerning the efficiency of the process of digitizing heritage. Some of the drawbacks refer to the deterioration and technological obsolescence due to the lack of funding for archival materials and underdeveloped policies that would regulate such a process. Another main social debate has taken place around the restricted accessibility due to the digital divide that exists around the world. Nevertheless, new technologies enable easy, instant, and cross-border access to the digitized work. Many of these technologies include spatial and surveying technology to gain aerial or 3D images.

Digital heritage is also used to monitor cultural heritage sites over years to help with preservation, maintenance, and sustainable tourism. It aims to observe any changes, diseases, or deterioration that may occur on objects.

== Cultural and natural heritage ==
Digital Heritage that is not born-digital can be divided into two separate groups—digital cultural heritage and digital natural heritage.

Digital cultural heritage is the maintenance or preservation of cultural objects through digitization. These are objects, in some cases entire cities, that are considered of cultural importance. These objects are sometimes able to be digitized or physically represented in minute detail. Digital cultural heritage also includes intangible heritage. These are things such as "oral traditions, customs, value systems, skills, traditional dances, diets, performances", and other unique features of a culture. Intangible heritage is particularly vulnerable to destruction due to urbanization.

A digital elevation model (DEM) of the Malaspina Glacier. A DEM is often used as a part of geographic information systems.

There are several projects and programs which concentrate on digital cultural heritage. One such project is Mapping Gothic France, which aims to document and preserve cathedrals across France using images, VR tours, laser scans, and panoramas. This allows for scientific and historical study and preservation of the cathedrals and also provides detailed access to the sites for anyone in the world. The aim of projects like these is to help with the preservation and restoration of cultural objects. After the fire at Notre-Dame de Paris in 2019, digital scans are a major component in the ongoing restoration.

Digital natural heritage pertains to objects of natural heritage that are considered of cultural, scientific, or aesthetic importance. Digital heritage in this instance is used not only to grant access to these objects, but to monitor any changes over time, such as with plant or animal habitats. Geographic information systems are a form of technology that is used primarily in the study of natural heritage. Western Australia has one such digital heritage project where they have created a digital repository of native plants important to both the region and the Aboriginal people. This is in order to protect and preserve the important biological heritage of Western Australia.

== Educational impact ==
The digitization of these heritage objects has impacts around the world and across many disciplines. The increase of digital items means that people, especially the youth, are able to learn about new objects and cultures online through various media. They provide viewers with a more in-depth experience with an item or place, instead of just an image. The media is also able to be curated to age- or educational-level appropriateness, making learning easier. Some of the technology used in education, especially in museums, includes mobile apps, virtual reality, social media, and video games. Cultural heritage institutions are using this technology to try to expand access, increase appreciation for these items, and to gain new viewpoints on their collections. Digital heritage also helps scientists, archaeologists, or other historians and specialists collect data on these objects, providing more information on the objects and the past.

Digital Heritage is still currently being studied and improved by several sectors invested in cultural and intellectual preservation. It is particularly of interest to museums, governments, and academic institutions. Research by these groups is creating new concepts, methodologies, and techniques for the implementation of digital heritage to protect this type of cultural and natural heritage. As new technologies are created, museums and other heritage institutions are provided with more ways of disseminating their information and engaging with the public. A lack of resources within certain groups may still hinder everyone from accessing digital heritage.

== Technologies used ==
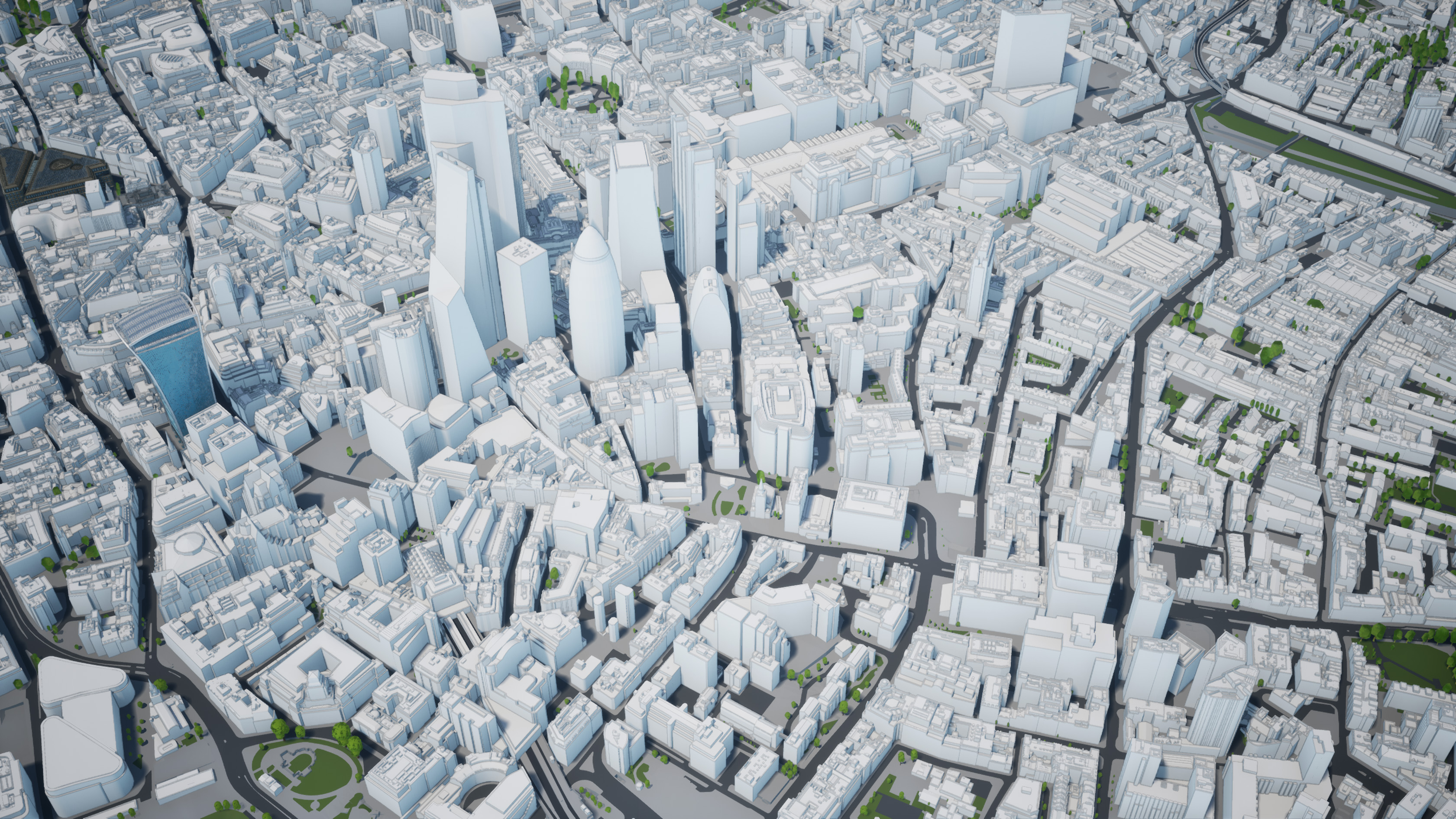
A 3D model of London, captured by aerial imagery in 2019

The digitization of cultural heritage is attained through several means. One of the main technologies used is spatial and surveying technology.

- Space archaeological technology – Observations from space satellites are non-intrusive and can be integrated with other technologies on the ground. It is used to photograph vast areas of Earth and help with research. Remnants of ancient civilizations or other human objects are also able to be spotted via satellite imaging.
- Unmanned aerial vehicles – UAVs, such as drones, are commonly used in the digitization of cultural heritage objects. The Great Wall of China is one such site that has been digitized and analyzed through unmanned aerial vehicle investigation. The resulting images, 3-D scans, maps, and other data are used to evaluate and maintain the Great Wall.
- Laser Scanning – Laser scanning is used to scan an area and recreate spatially accurate depictions, such as a 3D model.
- Virtual and Augmented Reality – VR is used primarily for education but does have uses for reconstruction and research. It is used to provide users with an immersive experience, as though they are actually at the site.
- Geographic Information systems – GIS are used primarily to study objects and sites over time. It is also important in studying the socioeconomic status of the past.
- 3D Modeling – 3D modeling has become more widely used due to an increase in technology that works specifically with heritage sites. It is often used in tandem with GIS to reconstruct objects for restoration, documentation, preservation, and educational purposes. Data is collected using satellite or other aerial imaging and ground-based imaging. There is some concern about the accuracy and authenticity of these types of digital reconstructions and their effects on the sites themselves.

A major barrier to digital heritage is the amount of resources it takes to undertake such projects, such as money, time, and technology. Money and the lack of qualified personnel are two that are considered the most obstructive. This is especially an issue in less developed areas or within underfunded groups such as minorities.

== Virtual heritage ==
A particular branch of digital heritage, known as "virtual heritage", is formed by the use of information technology with the aim of recreating the experience of existing cultural heritage, as in (approximations of) virtual reality. It is hard to differentiate this branch from the core contribution of digital heritage, which is storing the heritage data digitally. Parsinejad et al. developed two techniques for Digital Twinning of the architectural assets and representation of the physical assets virtually in the museum context. Two techniques are hand recording and digital recording, and both have challenges in the adoption and implementation of Digital Twin as a revolutionary concept.

== Digital heritage stewardship ==
Digital heritage stewardship is a form of digital curation which is modeled after collaborative curation. Digital heritage stewardship means stepping away from typical curatorial practices (e.g., discovering, arranging, and sharing information, material, and/or content) in favor of practices which allow its stakeholders the opportunity to contribute historical, political, and social context and culture. The collaborative practice encourages the creation, engagement, and maintenance of relationships with the relevant communities from which certain information, material, and/or content originates.

A notable use of digital heritage stewardship is for the preservation of Indigenous heritage. The Plateau Peoples' Web Portal is an online archive developed and collaborated on by representatives from six different tribes — the Colville, Coeur d'Alene, Spokane, Umatilla, Yakama, and Warm Springs — along with the team for Washington State University Libraries' Manuscripts, Archives, and Special Collections to curate Plateau peoples' cultural materials.

== Digital heritage studies ==
Digital heritage studies examine how people use the Internet to engage with elements of the past and attribute social and cultural meanings to them in the present. They also look into how concepts of history can change depending on the groups of people that engage with the objects or historical concepts. Digital heritage studies have also led to investigations on heritage as experiences.

== See also ==
- Archaeogaming – Archaeology of gaming or the use of video games in archaeology
- Digital archaeology – Application of digital technology to archaeology
- Digital humanities – Area of scholarly activity

== Bibliography ==
- Hemsley, James; Cappellini, Vito; Stanke, Gerd, eds. (2005). Digital Applications for Cultural and Heritage Institutions. Routledge. ISBN 978-0-7546-3359-4.
