= Digital archaeology =

Application of digital technology to archaeology

Digital archaeology is the application of information technology and digital media to archaeology. This includes the use of tools such as databases, 3D models, digital photography, virtual reality, augmented reality, and geographic information systems. Computational archaeology, which covers computer-based analytical methods, can be considered a subfield of digital archaeology, as can virtual archaeology. Digital archaeology plays a key role in data collection, analysis, and public outreach, enhancing the study and preservation of archaeological sites and artifacts.

The use of digital technology to conduct archaeological research allows data to be collected without the invasion or destruction of archaeological sites and the cultural heritage they hold, aiding the preservation of archaeological data. This is how many early archaeological sites were discovered in-depth. Applications of this technology have aided the reconstruction of historical monuments and artefacts such as pottery, human fossils, and mummified remains.

== Subfields ==
=== Virtual archaeology ===
Virtual archaeology is a subfield of digital archaeology that creates and use virtual models and simulations of archaeological sites, artifacts, and processes. It makes use of 3D modeling, virtual reality (VR), augmented reality (AR), and other technologies to recreate or visualize archaeological findings.

=== Computational archaeology ===
Computational archaeology is a subfield of digital archaeology that focuses on the analysis and interpretation of archaeological data using advanced computational techniques. This field employs data modeling, statistical analysis, and computer simulations to understand and reconstruct past human behaviors and societal developments.

== Methods and technologies ==
=== Geographical information systems ===
A geographic information system (GIS) is used within digital archaeology to document, survey and analyse the spatial data of archaeological sites. The use of a GIS within the study of archaeology involves in-field analysis and collection of archaeological and environmental data, predominantly through aerial photography, spatial cognition, digital maps and satellite imaging. The application of GIS in the analysis of archaeological data allows archaeologists to process the data collected efficiently, recreate landscapes of archaeological sites through spatial analysis, and supply the archaeological findings to public archives. The use of this digital method has enhanced the ability of archaeologists to analyse the geography and spatial relationships of ancient archaeological sites.

=== 3D modelling ===
3D modelling is a digital technique used within archaeological research to interpret, analyse, and visualise data. The technique utilises methods of satellite imaging and aerial photography, amongst other digital imaging techniques to construct 3D models of the geography, architecture and archaeological findings of historical sites. Reduced scale physical models of fragmentary architecture has helped refit damaged architecture.

The application of computer technology allows large amounts of image sequencing to be collected and processed by archaeologists, enhancing the photorealistic texture mapping within the construction of these 3D models.

=== Remote sensing ===
==== Aerial photography ====
Aerial photography is a tool used within the field of archaeological research to discover, place and document archaeological sites. The application of this technology developed from its previous use as a method of military surveillance throughout the First World War, and offers a non-destruction means of archaeological research.

The documentation of archaeological sites through Aerial Photography techniques involve the use of digital cameras, GIS and rectification software to collect numerous black and white photographs of the site for archaeological study. These photographs can be used by archaeologists to enhance the details of the site and plot the composite features. These results are often analysed to create a geographical framework, allowing archaeologists to create a map inclusive of the sites landscape features.

Sites recognised by Aerial Photography are then classified into shadow sites, crop-marks and soil-marks.

==== Photogrammetry ====
Photogrammetry is the science and technology of obtaining reliable information about physical objects and the environment through the process of recording, measuring and interpreting photographic images and patterns of electromagnetic radiant imagery and other phenomena.

==== LiDAR ====
LiDAR is a method for determining ranges by targeting an object or a surface with a laser and measuring the time for the reflected light to return to the receiver.

=== Total station theodolite ===
A total station theodolite (TST) is a surveying instrument that utilises electronic distance measurement technology to analyse archaeological sites. TST technology allows the distance of an archaeological site to be documented and maps to be established. This is conducted through the measurement of distance between the TST instrument and the site selected. The use of reflectorless TST technology as a method of archaeological research utilises an infrared beam to record measurements of archaeological sites, this allows archaeologists to study the spatial landscape of sites despite possible inconsistencies in elevation.

TST technology is considered a direct surveying technique as it utilises the manual acquisition of points of reference by the operator. TST techniques allow data to be downloaded and analysed after the archaeological survey is complete, limiting the awareness of an archaeologist when conducting in-field analysis. However, if the TST technology is connected to a portable computer recording the archaeological data, an archaeologist is able to view the data as it is collected.

== Data collection ==
The use of Information Communication Technology and digital techniques in archaeological studies has furthered the development of documenting archaeological data. This incorporation of modern technology throughout the process of conducting archaeological research has allowed commercial, academic and heritage management fields to become increasingly unified. The recording of archaeological data is distinguished through methods of acquisition, analysis, and representation throughout the process of data handling.

Data collected through digital technology when conducting archaeological research is stored on archives at digital repositories. The databases are then checked for integrity to ensure the data can be accessed and analysed for further research. The development of Information Communication Technology and digital techniques has allowed larger amounts of data to be collected and stored from archaeological research.

== Applications in fieldwork ==
=== Virtual reconstruction of Roman wall paintings in the Sarno Baths ===
The application of digital technology through virtual analysis and 3D reconstruction of the frigidarium in the Sarno Baths in Rome has allowed archaeologists to reconstruct and preserve deteriorating wall paintings. The reconstruction involved digitally removing salt deposits and abrasions in the paint layers. The use of virtual analysis and digital imaging by archaeologists allowed the preservation and reconstruction of the wall decorations to reveal further archaeological data on the methods of its original construction.

=== Delphi4Delphi ===
The Digital Enterprise for Learning Practice of Heritage Initiative for Delphi, otherwise referred to as Delphi4Delphi, is a research project conducted by archaeologists to document and reconstruct the historical sites at Delphi, Greece. The project aimed to capture and reconstruct archaeological monuments and artefacts located in Delphi through 3D imaging and reconstruction. The archaeological sites studied were the Temple of Apollo, the Sanctuary of Athena Pronea, the Treasury of the Siphians, the theatre and gymnasium, and the bronze charioteer and marble sphinx located at the site. The project utilised digital methods of spectral documentation, 3D stereo photography systems, and the processing of 2D image sequences into 3D structures to document, analyse and reconstruct the archaeological sites.

=== Multi-Object Segmentation for Assisted Image Reconstruction ===
The Multi-Object Segmentation for Assisted Image Reconstruction, or MOSAIC+, is a project conducted by archaeologists to reconstruct fragments found in the Church of St.Trophimena in Salerno, Italy. Archaeologists conducted research involving the craquelure detection of the Visitation fresco, painted by Francesco Salviati in 1538, utilising differing dimensions of the patch and in-painting present. This study found the use of this digital imaging technology as non-optimal due to the distribution of larger holes within the image's restoration. Further research was conducted into the fresco fragments and their reconstruction before and after undergoing the processes of craquelure detection and in-painting.

MOSAIC+ aimed to develop the work of archaeologists through the catalogue, indexing, retrieval and reconstruction of fragments found at archaeological sites, allowing the extraction of colour and shape features to be completed accurately. Through the application of digital techniques throughout conducting this research, the results indicate the possibility of virtual reconstruction to restore the appearance of archaeological artworks and aid the reconstruction of fragmented artefacts by archaeologists.

=== Maxentius 3D Project ===
The Maxentius 3D Project, undertaken by the Sapienza University located in Italy, is a research project involving the 3D reconstruction of the Circus of Maxentius in Rome. The Circus of Maxentius, situated in the Appion way regional park, is a structure commissioned by the Roman Emperor Maxentius towards the beginning of the 4th century A.D. However, due to its position within a regionally protected area, the vegetation preventing the reconnaissance of the structure by researchers cannot be removed in order to preserve the local ecosystem. Although the site is largely covered by this vegetation, the study of archaeological data collected through cartography, axonometric drawings, archaeological plans and historical illustrations, has allowed archaeologists to construct a 3D model of the monument used to document, analyse and hypothesise its reconstruction.

The project involved the archaeological analysis of the two towers of the Oppidum, the Carceres, the Stands, the Tribunal, the Pulvina, the Spina, the Porta Libitinensis, the Porta Triumphalis and the terrain to create a scientifically correct 3D model of the site. It is through this analysis that archaeologists were able to document a terraced roof, twin staircases and embedded amphoras located at the site, and were able to form a deeper understanding of the sites original construction. The use of archaeological data and digital techniques throughout this research project revealed the possibility for 3D imaging to hypothesise the accurate reconstruction of archaeological sites.

=== 3D reconstruction of Soli, Cyprus ===
The 3D reconstruction of Soli, Cyprus, has allowed archaeologists to create 3D visual models of sites of cultural heritage and archaeological architecture that are inaccessible or restricted to documentation by archaeologists through the analysis of open data from social media sites. Soli, initially designed by the Athenian statesman Solon, is an ancient city built during the 6th century BC and is located in the northern region of Cyprus. The study focused on the reconstruction of the amphitheatre located at the site, a Roman structure built on a previous Greek theatre dating back to the 2nd century BC.

The application of digital imaging, distortion correction and geo-referencing techniques to estimate the sites 3D landscape features from 2D image sequences, and verification of the documentation through existing drawings and Google Earth maps, allowed archaeologists to reconstruct the amphitheatre. Archaeologists were then able to create a geo-referenced 3D model and a digital surface model through processes of image extraction, quality analysis, image alignment, 3D cloud point generation, modelling, photorealistic texture mapping, and geo-referencing. Researchers additionally utilised KMPlayer software to extract the image sequencing frames into JPEG'S, a lens correction model was then applied and the points of interest throughout the site were matched through the overlap of selected images. Through the application of aerial video imagery and digital imaging techniques throughout this project, archaeologists were able to capture, store, process, share, visualise and annotate 3D models of the amphitheatre located at the inaccessible site of Soli, Cyprus through time and cost effective measures in the field.

=== A Night in the Forum ===
A Night in the Forum is an Educational Environmental Narrative compatible with PlayStation® VR that is modelled from the 3D reconstruction of the forum of Augustus in Rome. The project utilised 3D modelling and Virtual Reality technology, applying Image Based Modelling to combine computer vision and photogrammetric algorithms to reconstruct the archaeological site from 2D images. The construction of the VR game involved stages of Pre-production, production, and Level creation Authoring.

The pre-production stage involved the documentation and analysis of the archaeological data relevant to the game context. This process involved the geometric acquisition of cultural artefacts through the use of image-based and range-based sensors, allowing researchers to obtain digital replicas of the objects. The data gathered by researchers in the field was processed though Agisoft Photoscan software to estimate the camera positions and depth information to form into point clouds.

The production phase of this project prioritised the archaeological interpretation of data, 3D modelling reconstruction, performance analysis and optimisation of assets. The process involved the application of three-dimensional surveying and topographic surveying to ensure realism within an aesthetic rendering of the VR game. The 3D models obtained from surveys allowed graphic simulations to be conducted and the extraction of metric data to be accurate. This allowed the virtual location and restoration of fragments documented to be hypothesised.

The Level Creation and Authoring phase of the project involved the graphic layout and environmental simulation of the VR game and the addition of details that confer realism. This process involved the application of scene-dressing, real time rendering and soundscapes.

Through the application of 3D modelling and Virtual Reality technology to create of A Night in the Forum, the project aims to allow players to experience the complex administration of Imperial Rome and gain knowledge on the forum of Augustus. The use of visualisation allowed archaeologists to enhance the understanding of archaeological contexts and the study archaeological sites through visual models. However, the use of this digital technology throughout the process of developing this game resulted in prolonged production, increased costs and the necessary involvement of experts in the fields of both archaeology and computer graphics.

== Evaluation ==
=== Benefits ===
The use of digital technology in the field of archaeology allows the analysis, documentation and reconstruction of data, historical sites and artefacts to be conducted through non-intrusive methods, allowing archaeologists to preserve the data and cultural heritage held within these archaeological findings.

As the Information Communication Technology available within the field of archaeology develops through technological advancements, archaeologists are able to obtain further access to these technologies, allowing greater amounts of archaeological data to be accurately documented and analysed. The technology currently available has allowed data to be efficiently disseminated, processed and supplied to public archives, with the use of in field surveillance techniques allowing a greater amount of on-site data analysis to be conducted by archaeologists.

The use of 3D modelling technology within digital archaeology allows researchers to accurately model archaeological sites, providing further information to formulate archaeological perspectives and promoting the communication between the cultural heritage of archaeological sites and the public population.

=== Criticisms ===
The use of digital technology within archaeology has allowed greater amounts of data to be collected by archaeologists. This collection of data requires greater maintenance of digital archives, often without a clear understanding of its relevance within archaeological research and dependent on further technological advancements to be accurately interpreted.

As the digital techniques used for archaeological research are developed, the sophistication of these technological advancements creates a larger margin of error for archaeologists when conducting, documenting and reconstructing archaeological research.

== See also ==
- Archaeogaming
- Digital heritage
- Digital history
- Digital humanities
- Digital Archaeology (exhibition)
- Institute for Digital Archaeology
- Open data
