= Jason Michael Holland =

English designer & lecturer

Jason Holland
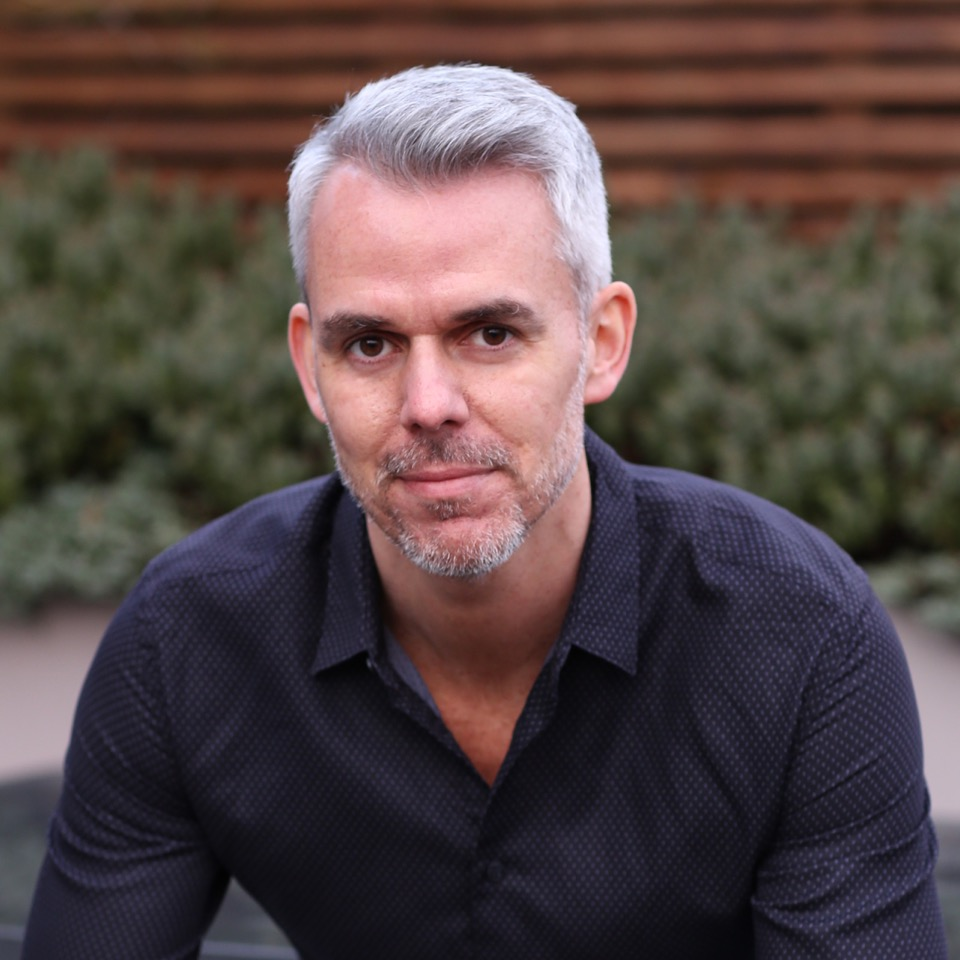
- Born: Jason Michael Holland; Cambridge, Cambridgeshire, England
- Education: University of Northumbria
- Occupations: Designer, lecturer, awards judge

Jason Michael Holland is an English designer, university lecturer, writer and awards judge who created the 1997 website Head-Space, which is included in Management Today's Ten Websites That Changed the World, and is an acknowledged blueprint for intranets and a precursor to YouTube. Holland is also credited with a number of other interactive firsts.

== Early life and education ==
Holland was bornin Cambridge, Cambridgeshire, England. His early childhood was spent in Brinsley, where he attended Matthew Holland School, now renamed Selston High School.

Holland studied the First Diploma in Art and Design at West Nottinghamshire College (Mansfield) from 1989 to 1990, followed by the two-year HND Graphic Design and returns frequently to mentor and lecture. He studied for his BA (Hons) Degree in Graphic design at Northumbria University from 1992 to 1995.

== Career ==
In 1995, Holland joined Hyperinteractive - one of London's earliest web design agencies - as Senior Designer. He has since founded three digital agencies. The first was Head New Media which became the UK digital arm of Lowe Worldwide. Head New Media included the specialist Interactive Television agency Head End that produced the first interactive commercials for Tesco and Unilever. In 1999, Holland and his then business partner, Felix Velarde were the subject of Keeping Creative, an episode of BBC Knowledge's 15 part series, "The Crunch", profiling innovative entrepreneurs. The documentary was made by Uden Associates and is still broadcast occasionally in Europe as part of BBC Worldwide's business education strand. Head New Media also sponsored the non-commercial, online creative community, Head-Space, that incubated prominent community websites including Urban75 and John Lundberg et al.'s Circlemakers.org. Head-Space has featured in the travelling exhibition Digital Archaeology since 2010, and has been recognised as a digital artefact of considerable historic and cultural relevance, a germinal precursor to YouTube.

Holland's next agency Underwired was equally innovative, pioneered the discipline of eCRM and rose to be named The RAR eCRM Agency of the Year 2015. In March 2016, Holland launched THE CRM Agency. with fellow Internet veteran John Thew.

== Notable Internet innovations ==
- 1995 designed the UK's first University Degree Show CD-ROM
- 1995 created the first interactive production featured at the D&AD Student Expo (now called New Blood)
- 1996 created the Sci-Fi Channel's first interactive TV tests
- 1996 designed the Snickers MegaBite website, which Campaign magazine described as Mars’ first real attempt to establish itself on the Internet.
- 1997 created the website Head-Space, which is an acknowledged blueprint for intranets and a precursor to YouTube.
- 1998 Designed first Interactive Television advertisements for Tesco and Unilever

== Other activities ==
- D&AD – “Turning your design portfolio into a job” masterclass
- D&AD – portfolio surgeries and student mentoring
- Farnham Sixth Form College – “Nurturing Digital Talent”
- 2005, 2014-5 BIMA Judge
- 2010-2015 Visiting Lecturer for Students of FE and HE courses across multiple Art, Design and Digital Media levels – West Notts College, now known as VISION
- 2013 to 2015 School of Communication Arts, Mentor
- 2014-5 DMA Judge, Best Use of Technology
- 2015 The Drum DADI Awards
- 2016 Visiting Lecturer, Hyper Island

== Awards ==
- 1994 Creative Futures Award, UK's Most Promising Talent,
- 1995 UK's first University Degree Show CD-ROM (also featured on the cover of Creative Review Magazine)
- 1995 First Student to show an interactive portfolio at the D&AD Student Expo
- 1996 Won the Marketing Design Award, the MacUser Maxine and an EPICA for Snickers MegaBite
- 1997 Three D&AD Awards in Interactive Media
- 1999 Cannes Lion (Best Online Community) for Head-Space (co-created with Felix Velarde)
- 2002 Internet Professional Publishers Association (IPPA) DX Design award for Art Community Redism, Bass Beers Worldwide
- 2005 Webaward for Outstanding Achievement in Web Development for Superscape
- 2006 BIMA Award for Best Use of Email
- 2006 & 2007 DMA (Direct Marketing Association) Gold Awards
- 2008 Interactive Media Council award for Outstanding Achievement for Respro website
- 2011 Head-Space included in Management Today's Ten Websites That Changed the World.
- 2015 eCRM Agency of the Year, RAR Digital Awards
