= Jason Holland =

Jason Holland may refer to:

- Jason Holland (ice hockey), Canadian-German ice hockey player
- Jason Holland (rugby union) New Zealand rugby union player
- Jason Michael Holland, English designer
- Jason Holland, convicted of the murder of Jimmy Farris in 1995
