= Hi-ReS! =

English design and marketing firm

- Industry: Design, digital marketing
- Founded: 1999
- Founder: Alexandra Jugovic, Florian Schmitt
- Defunct: 2017
- Headquarters: London, England
- Parent: Syzygy Group
- Website: hi-res.net

Hi-ReS! or Handsome information - Radical entertainment Systems! was a London-based design and digital marketing firm known for its elaborate commissioned websites.

== Background ==
Hi-ReS! was founded in 1999 by German designers Alexandra Jugovic and Florian Schmitt. Their first major effort, soulbath.com attracted worldwide attention as an experimental website that questioned the use of banner ads throughout the web. The company came to be known for its use of Flash technology to create immersive websites.

The success of Soulbath subsequently brought the firm their first commercial project, when filmmaker Darren Aronofsky reached out to them about a website for his film Requiem for a Dream. The site went on to critical acclaim, winning a Webby Award in 2001. This led to a number of websites for films including Richard Kelly's Donnie Darko which went on to win a Webby Award, and a distinction for Net Excellence by Prix Ars Electronica. The site featured in the 2004 Communicate exhibition curated by Rick Poynor at the Barbican Centre in London.

In January 2008, Hi-ReS! was acquired by Syzygy Group, a subsidiary of British advertising company WPP. The following June saw their first joint project with the international website for German liqueur brand Jägermeister.

Hi-ReS! owns a number of awards to its name, including a BAFTA, Cyber Lion, Clio, D&AD, and Webby Awards.

Hi-ReS! was headquartered in London, England, with offices in New York City, Berlin and Hamburg.

== Notable clients ==
=== Music ===
- The Beatles
- Beck
- Massive Attack

=== Feature films ===
- Donnie Darko
- Minority Report
- Requiem for a Dream

=== Theatre and production ===
- 20th Century Fox
- Artisan
- HanWay Films
- HBO
- Lionsgate
- MTV

=== Cars ===
- Hyundai
- Lexus
- Mitsubishi
- Toyota

=== Others ===
- Chanel
- The Economist
- Esquire
- IBM
- Jägermeister
- Nokia
- Red Bull
- Sony

== See also ==
- Digital Archaeology – a showcase of groundbreaking websites from the early days of the web
