= Paul Reilly (computer scientist) =

Paul Reilly is a pioneer of virtual archaeology and data visualisation in archeology. He was a research scientist at the IBM UK Scientific Centre. He received his B.A. Honours degree in archaeology and history from the University of Leeds and his Ph.D. in computer-based archaeological research, at the Research Centre for Computer Archaeology in North Staffordshire Polytechnic. He has worked on many archaeological excavation and field survey projects in Britain and elsewhere in Europe. From 1986 to 1989 he was an IBM UK Scientific Centre Research Fellow and became Research Scientist in 1989.

He is a Visiting Fellow at the Archaeological Computing Research Group, University of Southampton. He has written many papers and a book, as well as editing several conference proceedings, books and journals relating to computer applications and art practice in archaeological research.

== Selected publications ==
- Reilly, P., 1988, Computer Analysis of an Archaeological Landscape: Medieval Land Divisions on the Isle of Man. Oxford: British Archaeological Reports (British Series 190).
- Reilly, P., 1990, "Towards a virtual archaeology". Computer Applications in Archaeology 1990, Edited by K. Lockyear and S. Rahtz. oxford: British Archaeological reports (Int. Series 565), 133–139.
- Reilly, P., 1992, "Three-Dimensional modelling and primary archaeological data". In Archaeology and the Information Age. Edited by P. Reilly and S. Rahtz. London: Routledge, 147-173 (ISBN 9780415078580)
- Reilly, P., Shennan, S., 1989, "Applying solid modeling and animated three-dimensional graphics to Archaeological problems". Computer Applications in Archaeology 1989, Edited by S. Rahtz and J.Richards. Oxford: British Archaeological Reports (Int. Series 548), 157–166.
- Beale, G., Reilly, P. 2015, Additive archaeology: the spirit of virtual archaeology reprinted. In: C. Papadopoulos, E. Paliou, A. Chrysanthi, E. Kotoula, and A. Sarris, eds. Archaeological research in the digital age, Crete. Rethymno: Institute for Mediterranean Studies, 120–128.
- Reilly, P. 2015a. Putting the materials back into virtual archaeology, In: Virtual Archaeology (Methods and Benefits), State Hermitage Publishers, Saint Petersburg, pp 12–23.
- Reilly, P. 2015b. Additive Archaeology: An Alternative Framework for Recontextualising Archaeological Entities, Open Archaeology, 1 (1), ISSN (Online) 2300–6560, DOI: 10.1515/opar-2015-0013, October 2015
- Reilly, P. 2015c. Palimpsests of Immaterial Assemblages Taken out of Context: Tracing Pompeians from the Void into the Digital, Norwegian Archaeological Review, 48 (2). DOI: 10.1080/00293652.2015.1086812.
- Gant, S., Reilly, P. (2017) Different expressions of the same mode: a recent dialogue between archaeological and contemporary drawing practices, Journal of Visual Art Practice, 17(1), pp 100–120. DOI: 10.1080/14702029.2017.1384974.
- Dawson, I., Reilly, P. 2019. Messy Assemblages, Residuality and Recursion within a Phygital Nexus, Epoiesen, http://dx.doi.org/10.22215/epoiesen/2019.4
