= Northumbria University =

University in Newcastle upon Tyne, England

- Coat of Arms
- Motto: Latin: Aetas Discendi
- Motto in English: A lifetime of learning
- Type: Public
- Established: 1877; 149 years ago as Rutherford College of Technology; 1969; 57 years ago as Newcastle Polytechnic; 1992; 34 years ago gained university status
- Academic affiliations: ACU; Universities UK; Defence Universities Alliance
- Endowment: £1.21 million (2023)
- Budget: £338.3 million (2022/23)
- Chancellor: George Clarke
- Vice-Chancellor: Andy Long
- Academic staff: 1,765 (2022/23)
- Administrative staff: 1,720 (2022/23)
- Students: 29,685 (2024/25)
- Undergraduates: 20,750 (2024/25)
- Postgraduates: 8,935 (2024/25)
- Location: Newcastle upon Tyne, Tyne and Wear, England; 54.9764°N 1.6080°W
- Campus: Urban and suburban
Colours
University: Black & white
Northumbria Sport:
- Sporting affiliations: Wallace Group; BUCS
- Website: northumbria.ac.uk

The University of Northumbria at Newcastle, which operates as Northumbria University, is a public research university located in Newcastle upon Tyne, North East of England. It has been a university since 1992, but has its origins in the Rutherford College, founded in 1877.

Northumbria University is primarily based within City Campus located in Newcastle upon Tyne city centre and at Coach Lane campus on the outskirts of the city centre, London and Amsterdam. It is organised into four faculties—Arts, Design and Social Sciences; Business and Law; Engineering and Environment, and Health and Life Sciences. Northumbria has approximately 30,000 students.

According to the 2021 Research Excellence Framework, Northumbria University was rated 23rd in the UK for research power (the grade point average score of a university, multiplied by the full-time equivalent number of researchers submitted). This determines how much funding is awarded to universities to spend on research activity and represented the largest percentage-point rise in market share since the previous exercise. The annual income of the institution for 2022–23 was £338.3 million of which £16.4 million was from research grants and contracts, with an expenditure of £340.2 million.

Northumbria is a member of the Association of Commonwealth Universities, Universities UK and the Wallace Group.

== History ==
Northumbria University has its origins in three Newcastle colleges: Rutherford College of Technology, which was established by John Hunter Rutherford in 1877 and opened formally in 1894 by the Duke of York (later King George V), the College of Art & Industrial Design and the Municipal College of Commerce. In 1969, the three colleges were amalgamated to form Newcastle Polytechnic. The Polytechnic became the major regional centre for the training of teachers with the incorporation of the City College of Education in 1974 and the Northern Counties College of Education in 1976.

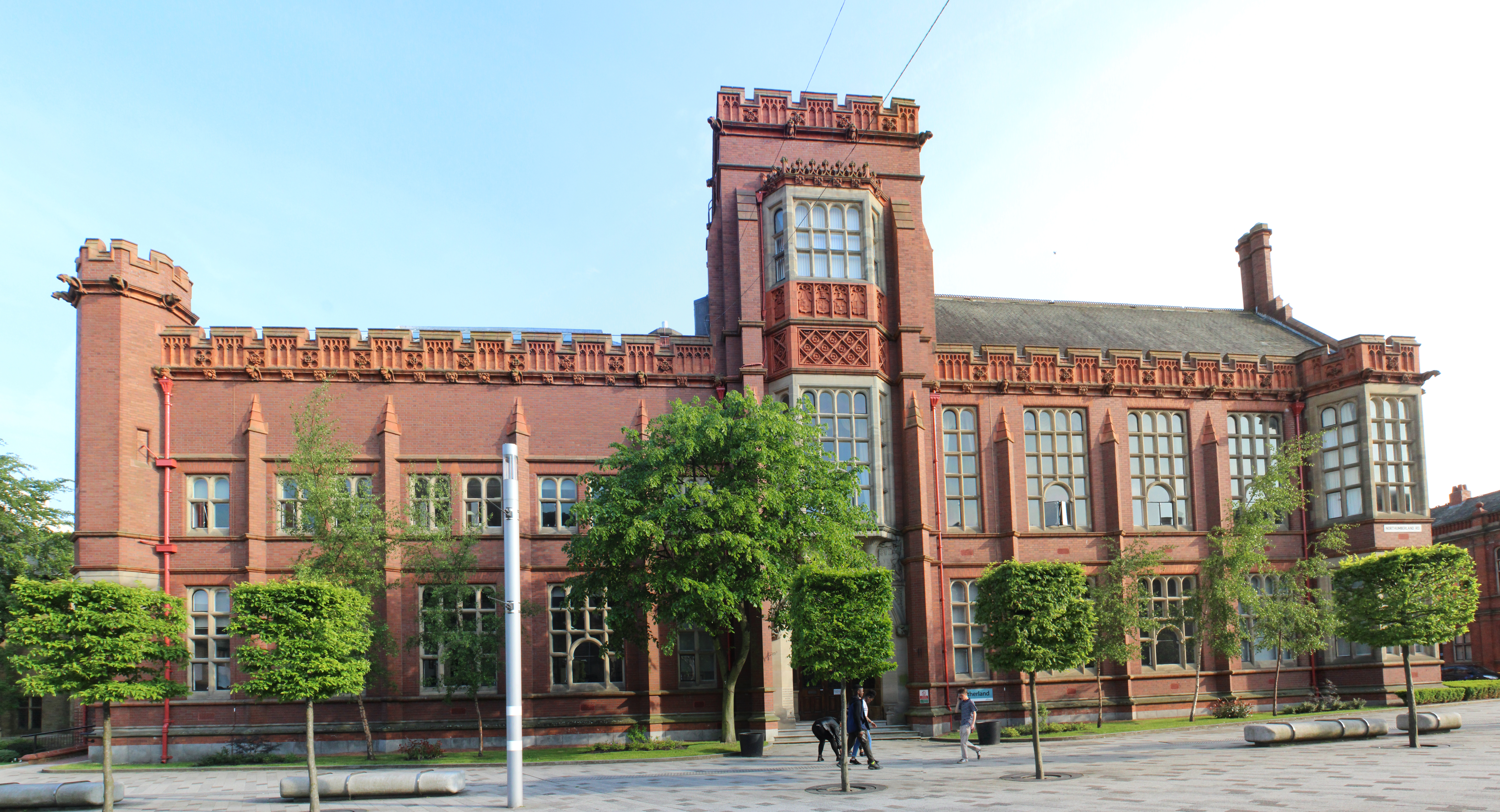
The Sutherland Building

In 1992, Newcastle Polytechnic was reconstituted as the new University of Northumbria, as part of a nationwide process in which polytechnics became new universities. It was originally styled, and its official name still is, the University of Northumbria at Newcastle (see the Articles of Government) but the trading name was simplified to Northumbria University in 2002. In 1995, it was awarded responsibility for the education of healthcare professionals, which was transferred from the National Health Service.

In 2017, the university was fined £400,000 after a sports science experiment gave volunteers a hundred times the safe dose of caffeine. A court hearing heard that the university had not trained staff in safety and had not carried out a proper risk assessment, and that the dose was above the level known to cause risk of death.

Northumbria was named the UK University of the Year 2022 by Times Higher Education. The award was given in recognition of Northumbria's transformation over more than a decade into a research-intensive modern institution. The judging panel stated "The scale of [Northumbria's] ambition, the rigour and effectiveness with which it has been pursued and its role in transforming lives and supporting its region all make it a deserving winner."

== Campuses ==
=== United Kingdom ===
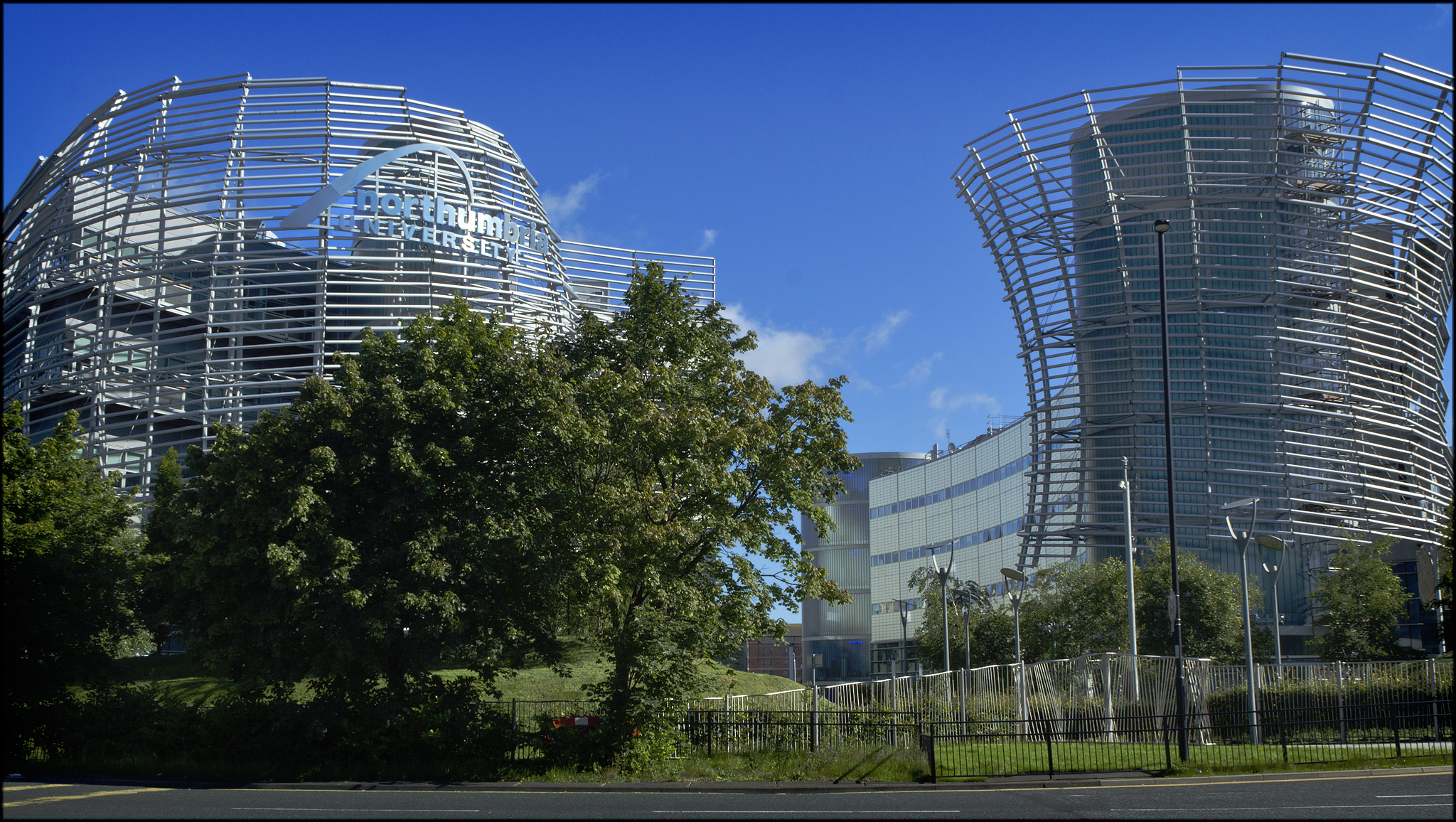
City Campus East, home to the law and business schools

The university has two large campuses situated in Newcastle and one in London.

==== City Campus ====
City Campus, located in the centre of Newcastle upon Tyne, is divided into City Campus East and City Campus West by the city's central motorway and linked by a bridge which was officially opened in 2008 by Lord Digby Jones.

City Campus East is home to the Schools of Law, Design and the Newcastle Business School (NBS). NBS and Law are housed in one building, and the School of Design is across a courtyard. City Campus East was designed by Atkins and opened in September 2007.

City Campus West is home to the Schools of Arts & Social Sciences, Built & Natural Environment, Computing, Engineering & Information Sciences and Life Sciences. Also located on this campus is the University Library, Students' Union building and Sport Central. Sport Central is a multi-purpose built sports centre and indoor arena that houses facilities for swimming, track running, climbing, golf, squash, basketball, netball, badminton, and volleyball. The main sports and events arena has a capacity for over 2,800 spectators. Sport Central opened in 2010, at a cost of £30 million.

The Sutherland Building, originally the Durham University College of Medicine, was a naval warehouse during World War II, and the Sutherland Dental School (named after donor Sir Arthur Sutherland) from 1948 as part of King's College, Durham and then Newcastle University until 1978. It is the home of studios for architecture students, which opened in 2019.

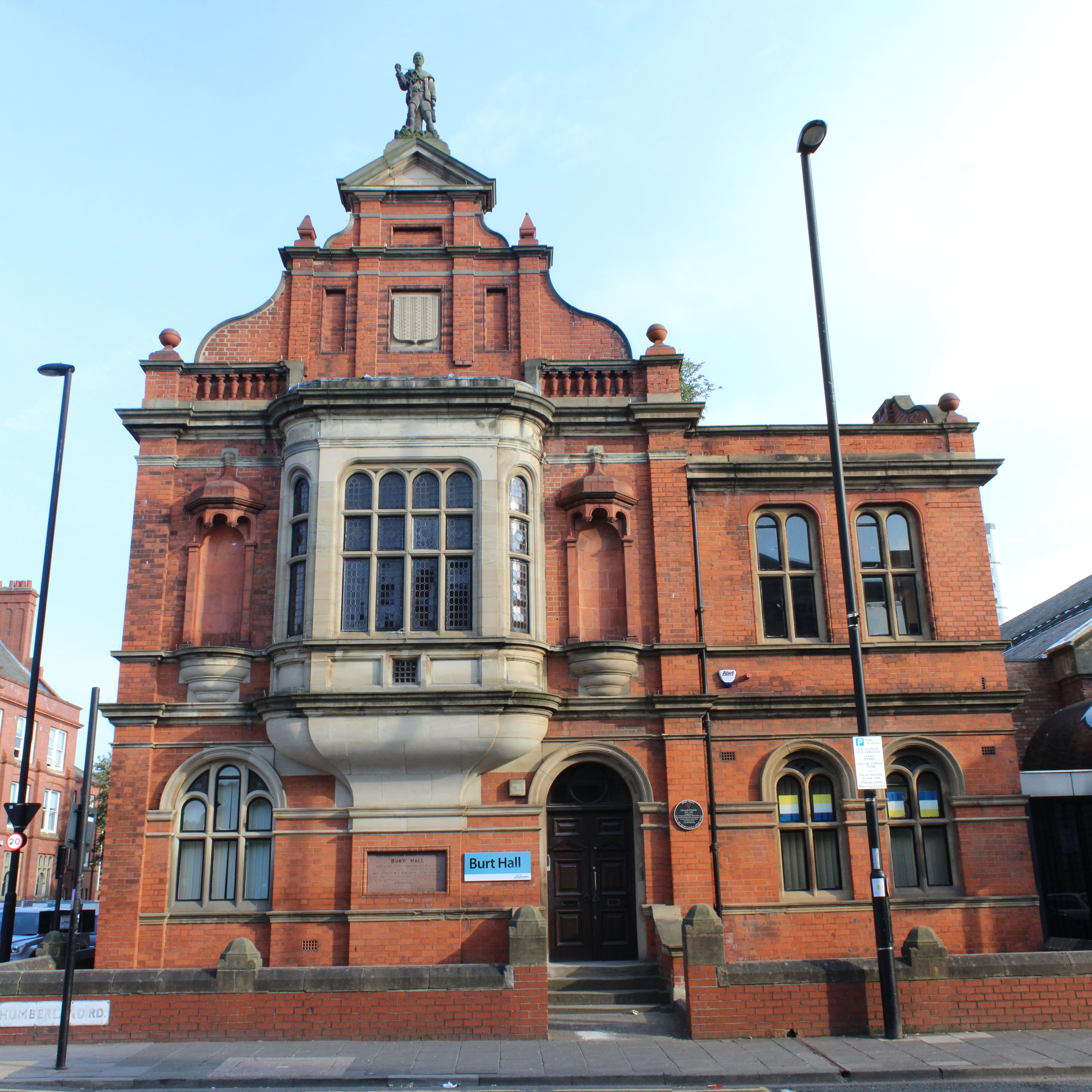
Burt Hall

Administrative departments including Finance & Planning and Human Resources, are based in Pandon Building. The Students' Union building at City Campus West underwent a multimillion-pound makeover with new lobby and recreational facilities, and a refurbished bar and cafe space, in summer 2010.

In September 2016, the Sandyford Building was acquired from Newcastle College.

In 2018, a £7m building for Computer and Information sciences was opened in City Campus West in place of the demolished Rutherford Hall.

==== Coach Lane ====
The Coach Lane Campus is located 2.6 miles (4 km) outside Newcastle on Coach Lane at Cochrane Park near the A188 (Benton Road).

The Coach Lane Campus is home to a number of areas of the Faculty of Health and Life Sciences, the Departments of Nursing, Midwifery and Health and Social Work, Education and Community Wellbeing, as well as the Police Constable Degree Apprenticeships programmes. Coach Lane Campus has computing and library services; and sports facilities, including indoor courts, a fitness suite, outdoor rugby and football pitches, and an all-weather floodlit pitch.

==== London Campus ====
The London Campus offers full-time or part-time programmes, from a range of Business, Computing, Cyber, Project Management and Technology focused programmes to approximately 2,500 students. The campus is near Liverpool Street station, close to London's financial district.

=== International ===
Northumbria has an international campus based in Amsterdam, Netherlands through a partnership with Amsterdam University of Applied Sciences where it offers accredited postgraduate qualifications and the opportunity for undergraduates to experience overseas studies.

== Organisation and structure ==
Northumbria offers programmes in the disciplines of law and business, arts and design, engineering, mathematics, physics computing, geography and environmental sciences, architecture and built environment, applied sciences and healthcare, sports science, humanities and social sciences, psychology, nursing, social work and teacher education.

Northumbria employs more than 3,100 people and offers undergraduate, postgraduate, CPD and degree apprenticeship programmes through three faculties:

- Faculty of Society and Culture
- Faculty of Science and Environment
- Faculty of Health and Wellbeing

=== Newcastle Business School ===
In September 2007, Northumbria opened its new Newcastle Business School building on the site of the former Warner Bros. cinema as part of the city campus east development. As of 2020, The university also holds accreditation for EPAS in 21 different undergraduate programmes. Newcastle Business School has also developed relations with a wide range of other professional bodies. As a result, the university can offer a wide range of professional exemptions in its programmes such as the Accountancy degree which holds exemptions from many of the top accountancy boards including ICAEW, ACCA, and CIMA.

In 2015, Newcastle Business School was the winner of 'UK Business School of the Year' at the Times Higher Education Awards.

=== Northumbria Law School ===
Northumbria Law School is located within City Campus East where it shares its building with Newcastle Business School. Northumbria Law School is one of the nine authorised education and training organisations that provide the vocational component of training for the Bar.

Northumbria also offers 'clinical' courses in law accredited by the Law Society and Bar Council. These allow graduates direct entry to the profession. The institution's Student Law Office is a clinical legal education enterprise, where law students participate in a legal advice and representation scheme on behalf of real clients, under the supervision of practising lawyers.

=== Medicine ===
Although the university roots are linked with medicine through the Sutherland Building being formerly the Medical School of Durham University, it has not offered medicine as a programme until recently. Northumbria has a joint medical programme through a partnership with St George's University, Grenada. As part of the programme the teaching hours are split between time spent within the Grenada and the United Kingdom.

== Academic profile ==
=== Reputation and rankings ===
Rankings
National rankings
- Complete (2027): 37
- Guardian (2027): 63
- Times / Sunday Times (2027): 52

Global rankings
- ARWU (2026): 801–900
- QS (2027): 528=
- THE (2026): 401–500

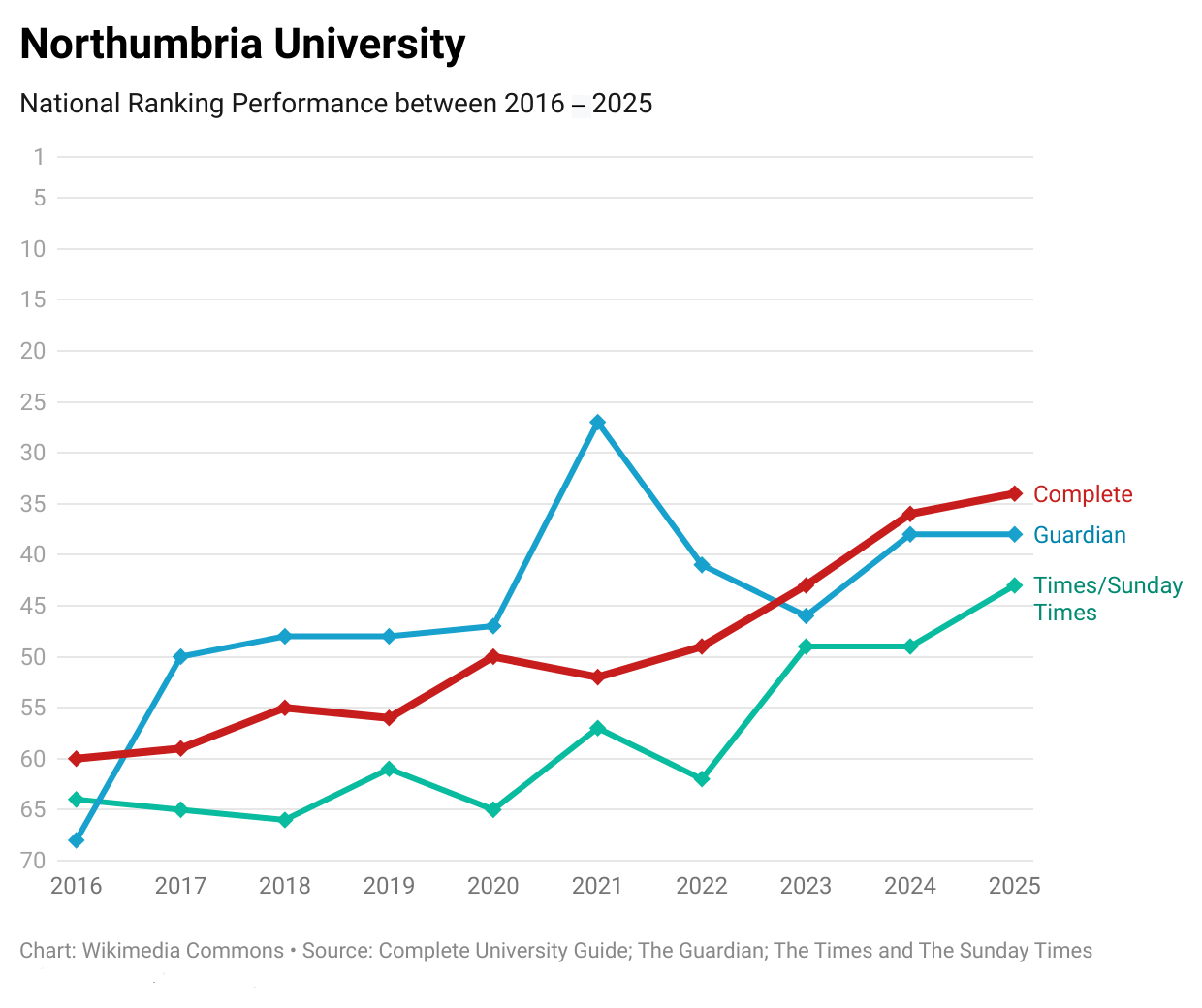
Northumbria University's national league table performance over the past ten years

Northumbria was named Times Higher Education University of the Year in November 2022. It was ranked joint 23rd for research power in the UK, according to the results of the 2021 Research Excellence Framework, as analysed by Times Higher Education. It was also ranked 10th in the UK for sustainability in the People and Planet University League 2024/25. Northumbria was ranked joint 96th globally among universities under 50 years old in the Times Higher Education's Young Universities Rankings 2024.

=== Research ===
In the 2021 Research Excellence Framework, the university climbed to 23rd place from 50th in 2014 and 80th in 2008.

In the UK Research Assessment Exercise 2008 some research in nine of twelve areas submitted was described as "world-leading". In the 2014 Research Assessment Exercise, Northumbria was one of the UK top 50 for research power and the university which had risen fastest up the rankings.

== Student life ==
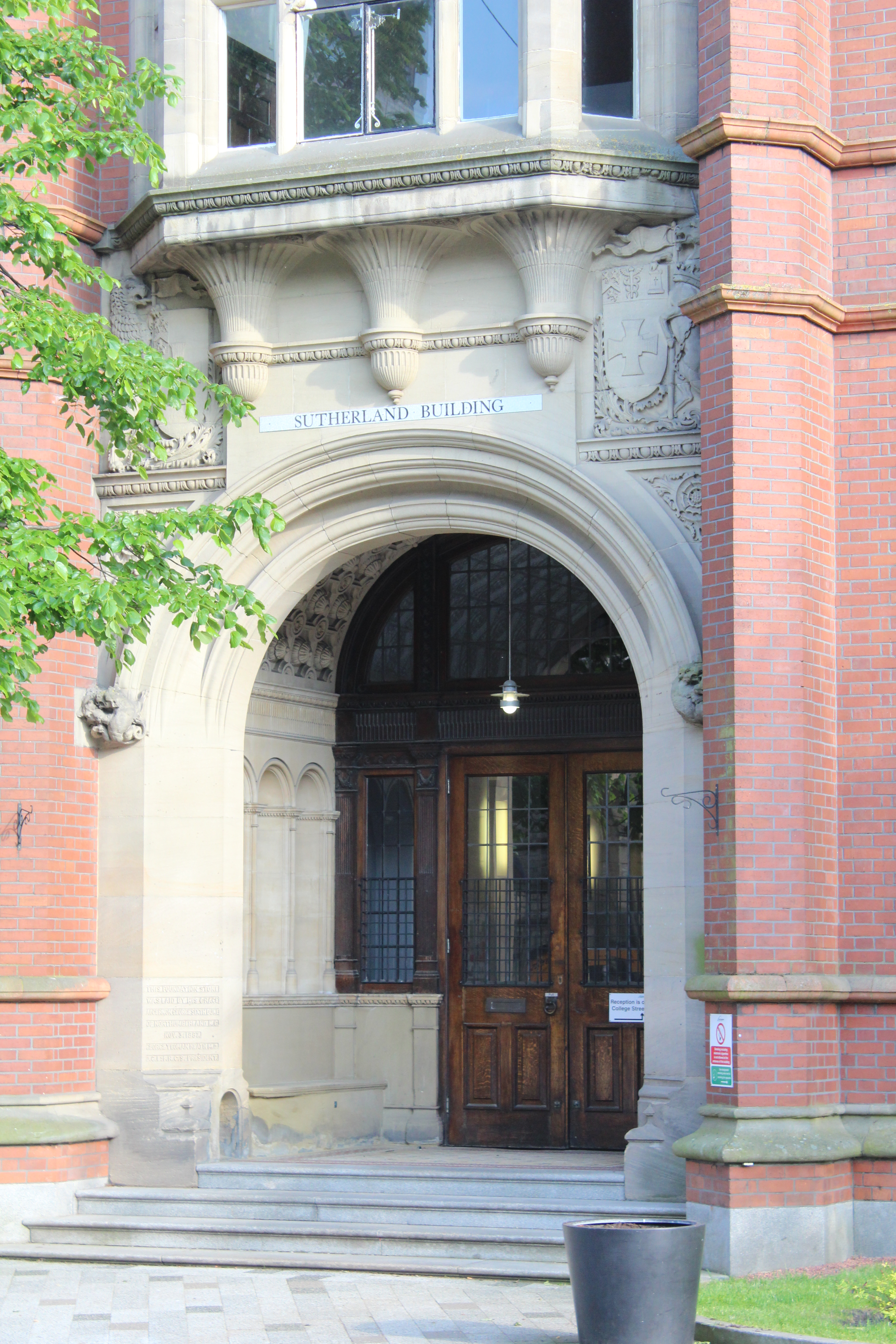
Sutherland Building main entrance

Logo of the Students' Union

Northumbria Students' Union is a campaigning and representative organisation. It is a charity currently exempt from registration and is led by six Sabbatical Officers (President and five vice-presidents) and a 26-member Student Council. The Students' Union offers a range of student activities such as NSU/Community, NSU/Media (Which encompasses NSU/TV, NSU/Life and NSU/Snaps), NSU/Rag (Raise and Give),NSU/Societies, NSU/Employability, Duke of Edinburgh awards and Fast Friends. It represents students in academic and non-academic matters through a nationally recognised School Reps and Postgraduate Research Reps Systems. The university building contains several venues for students to socialise, chiefly at Habita (formerly Bar One), Domain (formerly The Venue) and Reds.

In 2016, Northumbria Students' Union received the National Union of Students award for Student Opportunities and runner up for the Education Award.

=== Sport ===
Northumbria has several world class sporting alumniincluding Steve Cram, Stephen Miller, and Victoria Pendleton. Current student Taka Suzuki won seven medals, including five golds and two silvers in swimming at Tokyo 2020 Summer Paralympics Games.

== Notable alumni ==
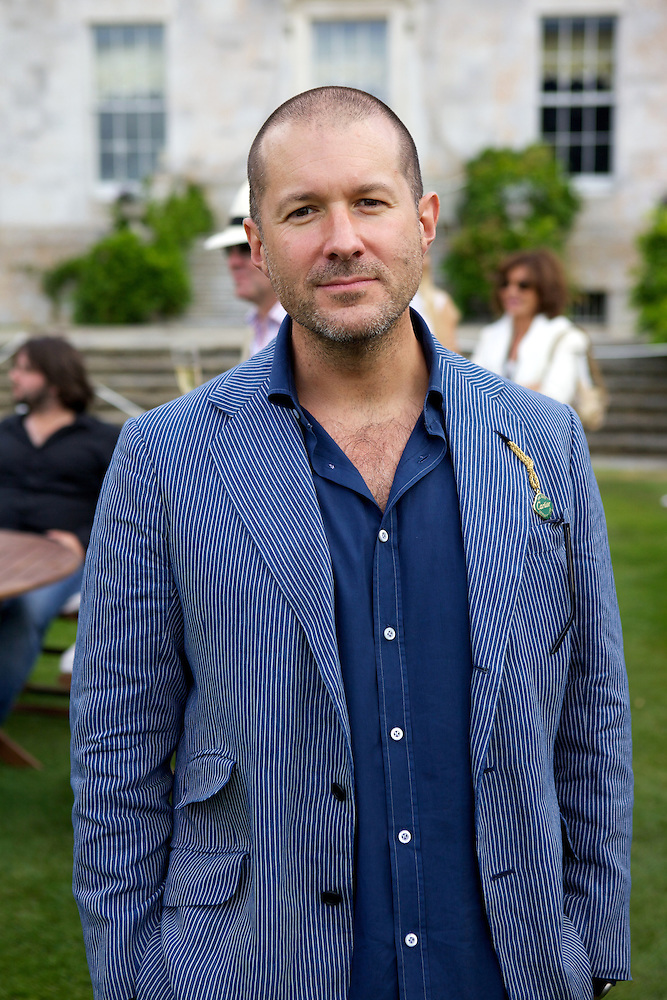
Sir Jonathan Ive, former Chief Design Officer at Apple Inc.

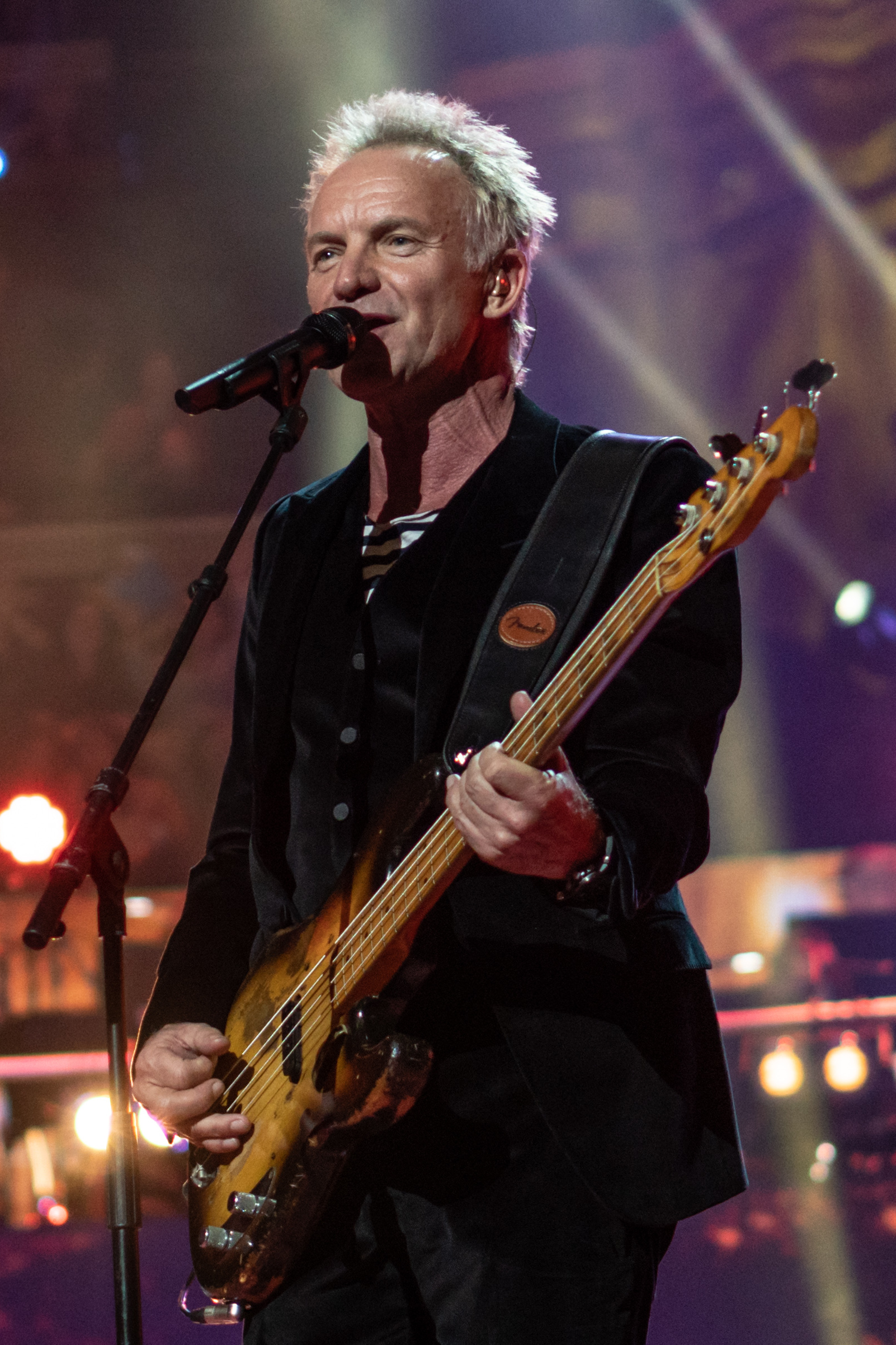
Sting (Gordon Matthew Thomas Summer), musician and former member of The Police

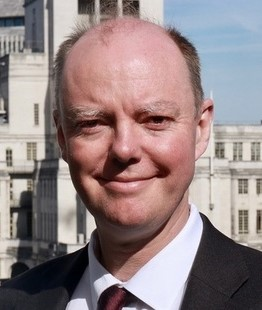
Sir Chris Whitty, Chief Medical Officer for England

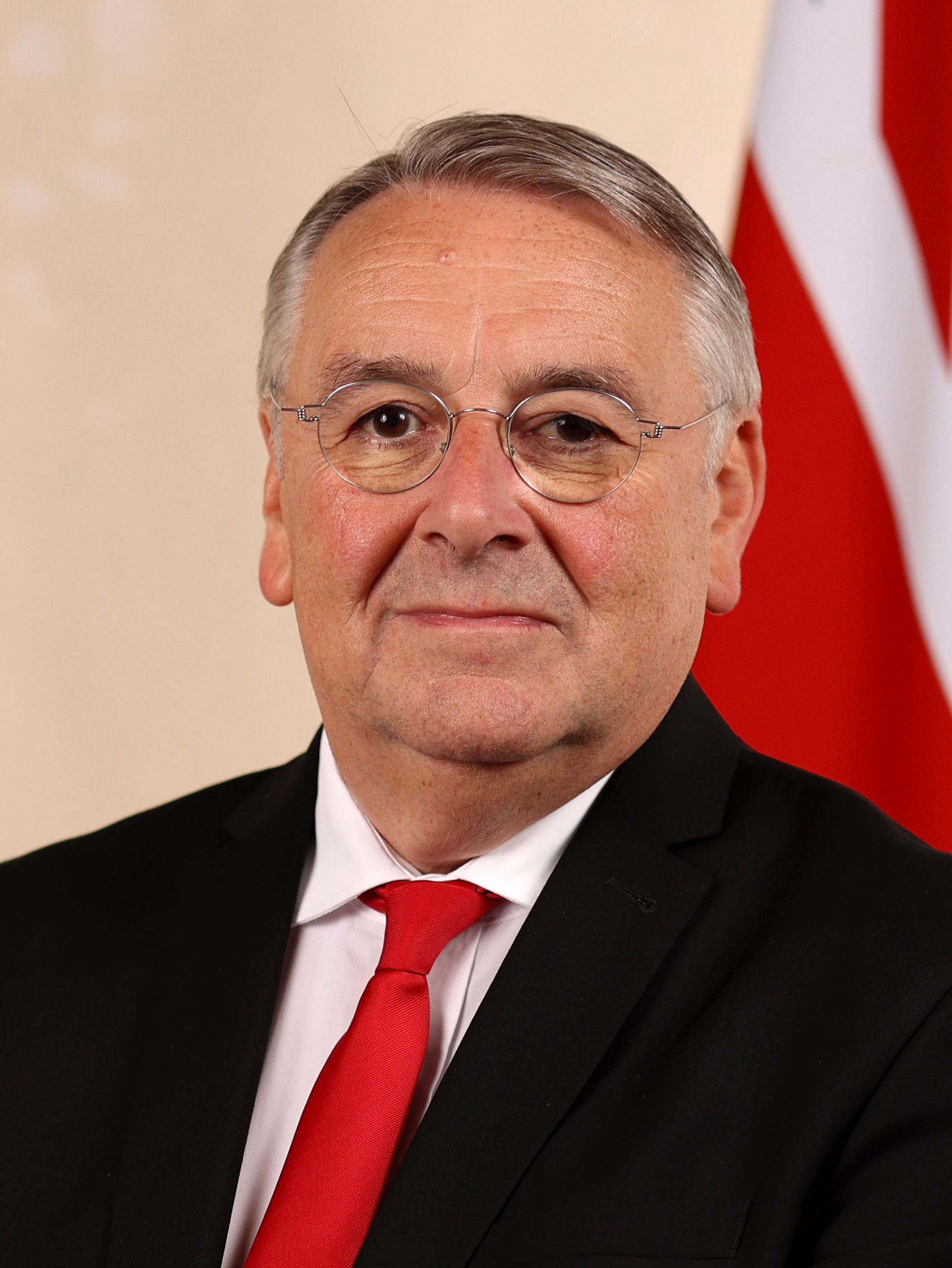
Alan Campbell, MP for Tynemouth and Chief Whip of the House of Commons

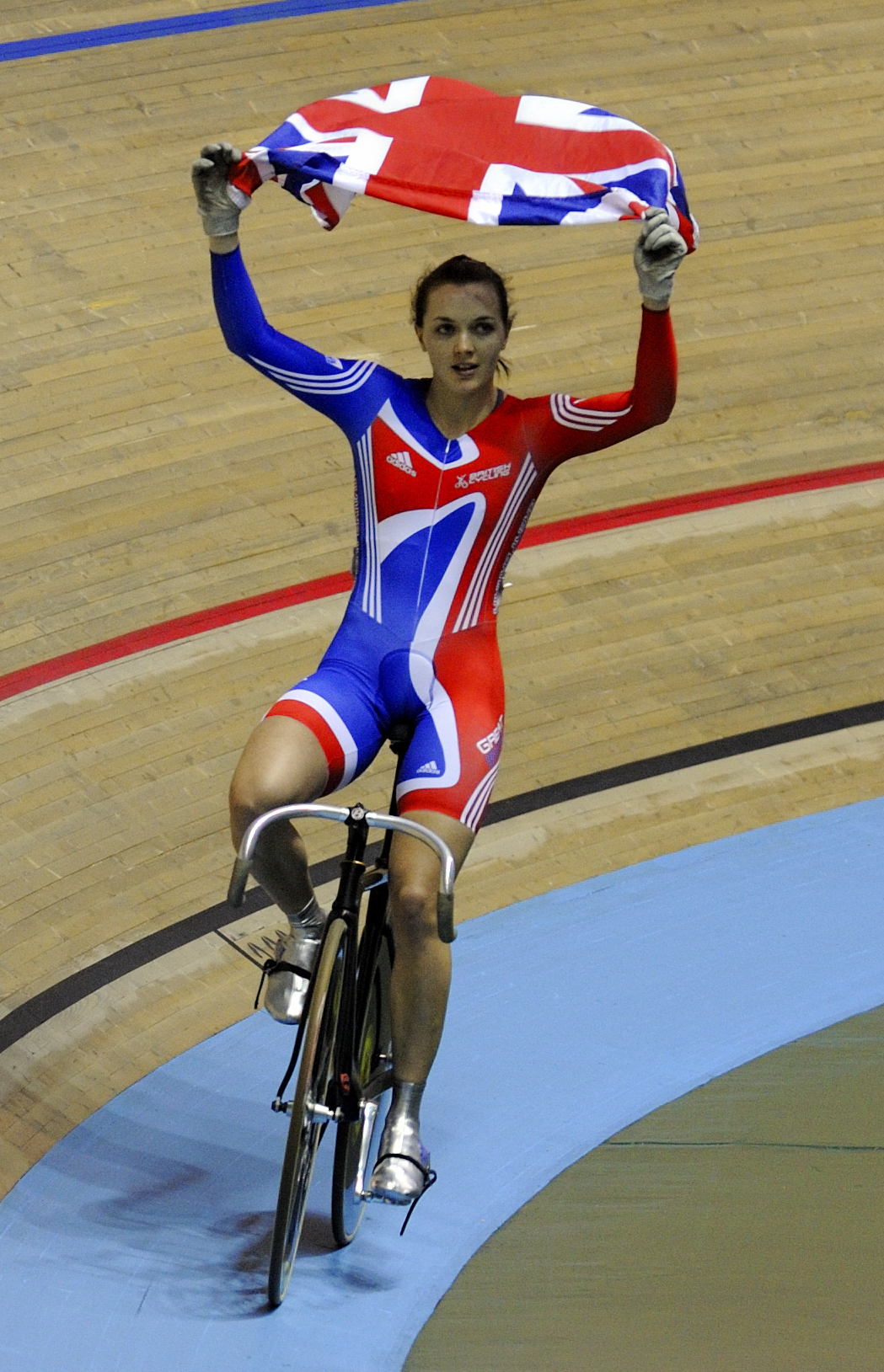
Victoria Pendleton, retired Olympic gold medalist and cyclist

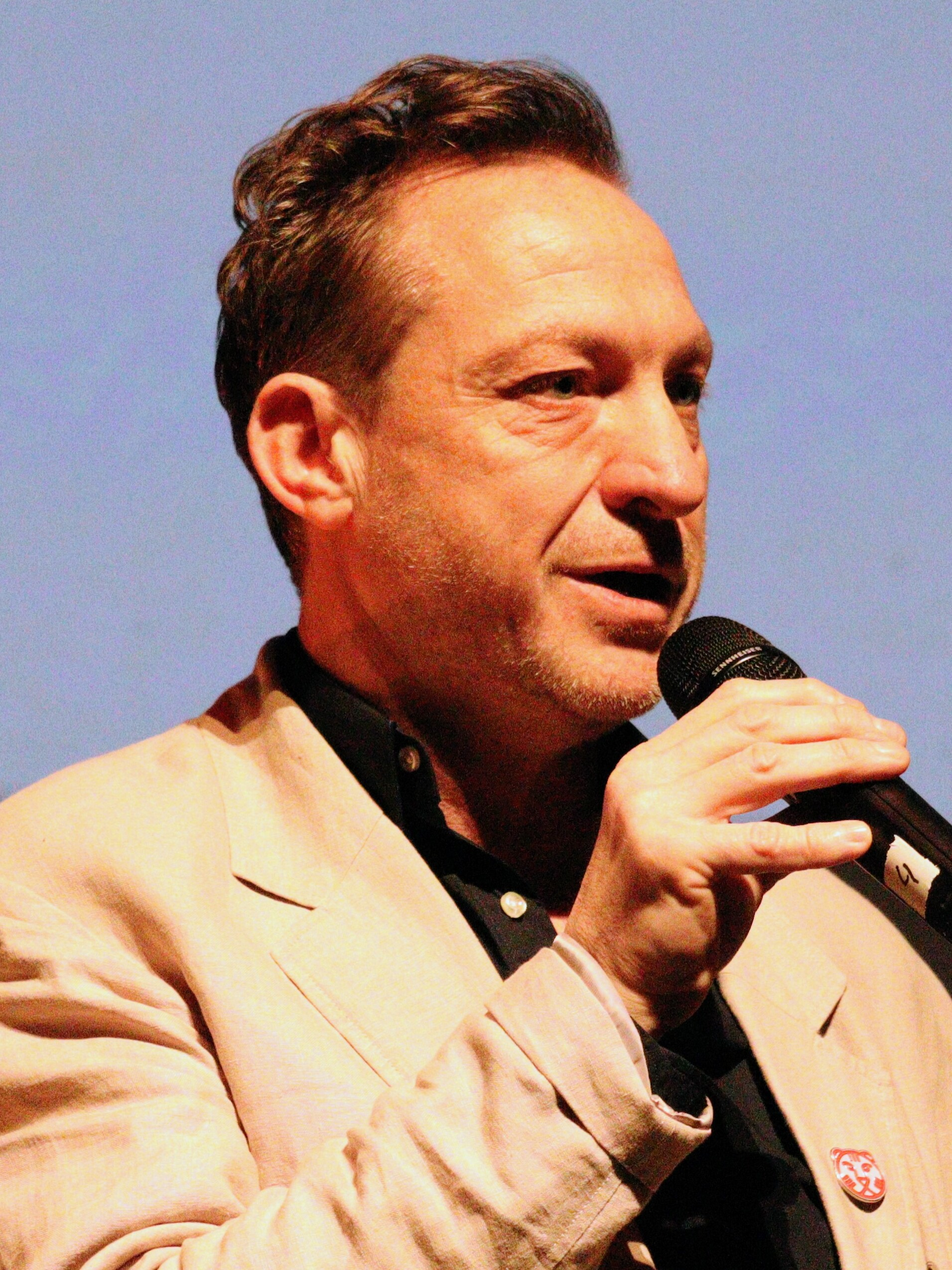
Lol Crawley, Oscar and BAFTA winning Cinematographer

Notable former students of Northumbria University, Newcastle Polytechnic, and Northern Counties College of Education include:

- Sam Ainsley, artist.
- Bibiana Aído Almagro, Spanish politician, previously served as Minister for Equality
- Chris Whitty, Chief Medical Officer for England
- Vera Baird, Victims's Commissioner for England and Wales, former Northumbria Police and Crime Commissioner, former MP for Redcar
- Tunde Baiyewu, vocalist, lead singer of the Lighthouse Family
- Amanda Berry, Chief Executive of BAFTA
- Rodney Bickerstaffe, former General Secretary of UNISON
- Gavin Brown, art dealer
- Lord Brownlow, Conservative peer and former Vice Chairman of the Conservative Party
- Alan Campbell, MP for Tynemouth and Chief Whip of the House of Commons
- Nigel Cabourn, fashion designer
- Mac Collins, artist and designer
- Chris Cook, GB Commonwealth and Olympic swimmer
- Martin Corry, England rugby international, and Leicester Tigers
- Steve Cram, English athlete and television presenter
- Lol Crawley, Oscar and BAFTA winning Cinematographer
- Ali Dia, Senegalese footballer
- Rick Dickinson, designer of the ZX81 computer
- Anke Domscheit-Berg, member of the German Bundestag
- Robbie Elliott, former footballer and coach of the United States U20 men's football team
- John Fashanu, footballer and TV personality
- Toby Flood, former England rugby international player and coach of the Newcastle Falcons
- Bridget Galloway, Nottingham Forest Women F.C. player and England youth international
- Mary Glindon, MP for Newcastle upon Tyne East and Wallsend and former MP of North Tyneside
- Lady Edwina Louise Grosvenor, prison reformer
- Scott Henshall, fashion designer
- Jason Holland, designer
- Louise Hopkins, artist
- Ben Houchen, the first Mayor of Tees Valley
- Sir Jonathan Ive, industrial designer, Chief Design Officer (CDO) of Apple Inc. and Chancellor of the Royal College of Art in London
- Kevan Jones, former MP for North Durham and a Baron in the House of Lords
- Riley Jones, actor
- Bharti Kher, contemporary artist
- Zeb Kyffin, professional cyclist for Unibet Tietema Rockets
- Max Lamb, furniture designer
- Emma Lewell-Buck, MP for South Shields
- Duncan Lloyd, lead guitarist of Maxïmo Park
- Guy Mankowski, author
- Neil Marshall, film director
- Mary Mellor, Emeritus Professor of Sociology
- Alexei Mordashov, Russian business oligarch
- Bob Murray, former chairman of Sunderland AFC
- Jamie Noon, retired England rugby international and Newcastle Falcons player
- Victoria Pendleton, retired Olympic gold medalist and cyclist
- Laura Pidcock, former MP for North West Durham and former Shadow Secretary of State
- Gerry Steinberg, former MP for City of Durham
- Sting (Gordon Matthew Thomas Summer), musician and former member of The Police
- Alan Tomes, retired Scotland national rugby team and British & Irish Lions player
- Kevin Whately, actor
- Stewart Wingate, CEO of Gatwick Airport
- Michael Volland - Bishop of Birmingham

== Arms ==
Coat of arms of Northumbria University
Notes Granted 9 November 1995. Crest On a wreath Argent and Gules, a lion sejant affronty Or holding in the dexter forepaw a torch Azure enflamed Proper and supporting with the sinister forepaw a trident also Azure. Escutcheon Per fess enarched and embattled Argent and Gules in chief two castles triple-towered also Gules and in base an open book Or. Supporters On either side a sea-horse the head neck and forelegs Argent the piscine parts Bleu Céleste dorsally finned Or gorged with a mural crown Gules and supporting between the forelegs a trident erect Azure. Motto 'Aetas Discendi'

The university states 'Northumbria's shield contains two triple-towered castles, representing the City of Newcastle upon Tyne, and an open book which represents learning. The arched line of battlements dividing the shield refers to the Roman Wall, a historic feature of Northumberland. Whilst the curve of the arch reflects the King George the Fifth Bridge over the River Tyne, more generally the bridge alludes to the university's role in the transmission of knowledge to, and strong links, with the society in which its located.' The crest is a lion grasping a flaming torch which is an emblem of learning, also a trident as the emblem of the old god of the River Tyne. The supporters are seahorses referencing the arms of Newcastle upon Tyne but with the addition of crowns around their necks, alluding to the Roman Wall and holding tridents of the River Tyne.

== See also ==
- Armorial of British universities
- Bullocksteads Sports Ground
- JISC infoNet
- Kingston Park (stadium)
- List of universities in the United Kingdom
- Post-1992 universities
- Rankings of universities in the United Kingdom
