= Urban75 =

British website and internet forum

- Website type: Community, local news, left-wing politics
- Headquarters: Brixton, London, England
- Editor: Mike Slocombe
- Website: urban75.org
- Commercial: No
- Launched: May 1995; 31 years ago
- Current status: Online

Urban75, also known as U75 or simply Urban, is a website and internet forum based in Brixton, London, and online since 1995.

== History ==
Urban75 originated from a football comic Bluebird Jones - an e-zine formed around football fans opposition to the Criminal Justice and Public Order Act 1994. The campaign received large amounts of exposure in the media, and in May 1995 an unknown helper on the campaign from Brighton put together the first version of the Urban75 site, using a modem donated by The Levellers. The site is characterised by an opposition to mainstream culture and does not carry adverts. Its editor is founder Mike Slocombe.

The site and forums expanded beyond football and direct action with a mix of left-wing politics, drugs, music, and photography amongst other interests. As it grew in popularity, it was forced to leave its web host Demon Internet, and was briefly hosted on the Head-Space Project until it moved to its own domain in August 1997. Early publicity was generated by Shockwave games in which politicians and celebrities could be virtually "slapped" or "punched".

== In the media ==
'Squirrels On Crack' in South London Press

In March 2002, Urban75 Lambeth police chief Brian Paddick posted on the forums while he was conducting a cannabis tolerance experiment. When the tabloid press discovered Paddick's posts on the site, a scandal ensued. In particular, the press highlighted one such post where Paddick had said: "The concept of anarchy has always appealed to me". Paddick subsequently met with the Metropolitan Police Commissioner, Sir John Stevens, and accepted criticism of his remarks. No disciplinary action was taken and Paddick remained in his post until his retirement in 2007.

In July 2005, Rachel North posted on the forums her account of having been caught up in the 2005 London bombings. This was reposted on a BBC blog in the days following the attack.

In October 2005, a forum post entitled "Can squirrels get addicted to crack?" was picked up by the local South London Press, leading to a number of national newspapers also running the story.

In September 2006 the technology news website The Register said Urban75 was "the naughty corner of British politics" after posters on the forum disrupted an online petition in support of then UK Prime Minister Tony Blair.

== Offline club ==
Urban75 held its first Offline club night in February 2004, and continues today hosting nights in Brixton venues such as the Ritzy Cinema, Dogstar, Brixton Jamm Club, 414 Club, and the Prince Albert. Offline hosts a line-up of DJs and has also put on well known acts such as Alabama 3, Sharks, Morton Valence, Stewart Lee, Josie Long, Rob Newman, Shazia Mirza, and Howard Marks.
