= Vision West Nottinghamshire College =

Coordinates: 53.1223°N 1.1911°W

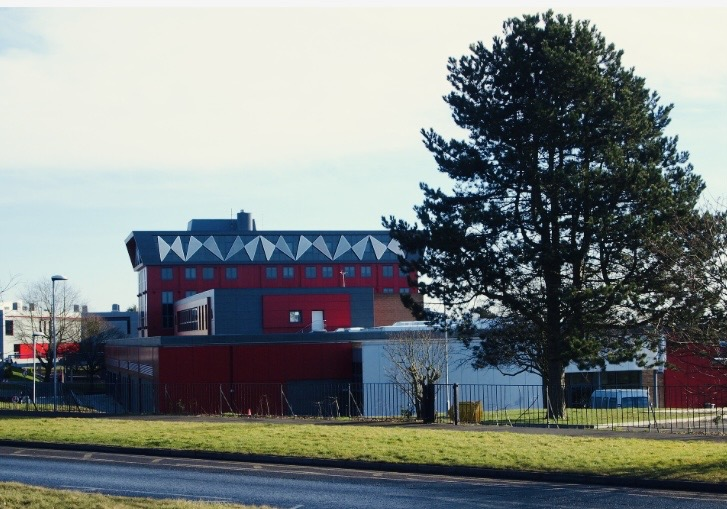
- The Derby Road Campus

Location
- Derby Road; Mansfield, Nottinghamshire, NG18 5BH; England

Information
- Type: Further Education College
- Established: 1928 as a Technical College
- Local authority: Nottinghamshire
- Specialist: ESOL (English for Speakers of Other Languages)
- Department for Education URN: 130777 Tables
- Ofsted: Reports
- Chair of the Corporation Board: Sean Lyons
- Principal & Chief Executive: Andrew Cropley
- Vice Principal: Communications, Engagement and Student Experience: Louise Knott
- Gender: Mixed
- Age: 14 to 65
- Enrolment: about 26,000 full and part-time
- Website: www.wnc.ac.uk

Vision West Nottinghamshire College is the trading name of West Nottinghamshire College, a further education college having two main campuses in Mansfield, with smaller sites at nearby Sutton-in-Ashfield and Kirkby-in-Ashfield, Nottinghamshire, England.

The main college campus is the Derby Road campus on the south edge of Mansfield; the Chesterfield Road campus is in Mansfield town centre. There are other sites and further affiliated outreach venues in the Mansfield and Ashfield area and the largely urban corridor along the M1 motorway route between the counties of Derbyshire and Nottinghamshire.

The College of Further Education was formed in the 1970s by combining elements of an old Technical College dating back to 1928 and adjacent College of Arts dating from 1930 in Mansfield town centre with a newer, main Technical College established in 1960 at a large development on former farmland at Derby Road, on the outskirts of Mansfield. Both sites remain in use, and the college provides dedicated shuttle buses from the different sites.

== College ==
As of 2018, the college's website quoted 26,000 students including apprentices. It offers further education to about 19,000 students in full- and part-time education including courses for 14- to 16-year-olds in collaboration with local schools. The programmes include the majority of 'A' Level courses, access to higher education, and vocational apprenticeships which include bricklaying, plumbing, carpentry, gas fitting, painting and decorating, construction management, driving passenger vehicles, forklift truck driving and railway engineering. A variety of community and adult courses is also provided across the local area. The college has a Centre of Vocational Excellence (CoVE) status for engineering, specialised construction, logistics and care. A 2008 Ofsted report accorded the school Grade 1 (outstanding) on all inspection points, but at the 2012 inspection the college ratings lowered from Outstanding to good overall with some satisfactory areas and some inadequate.

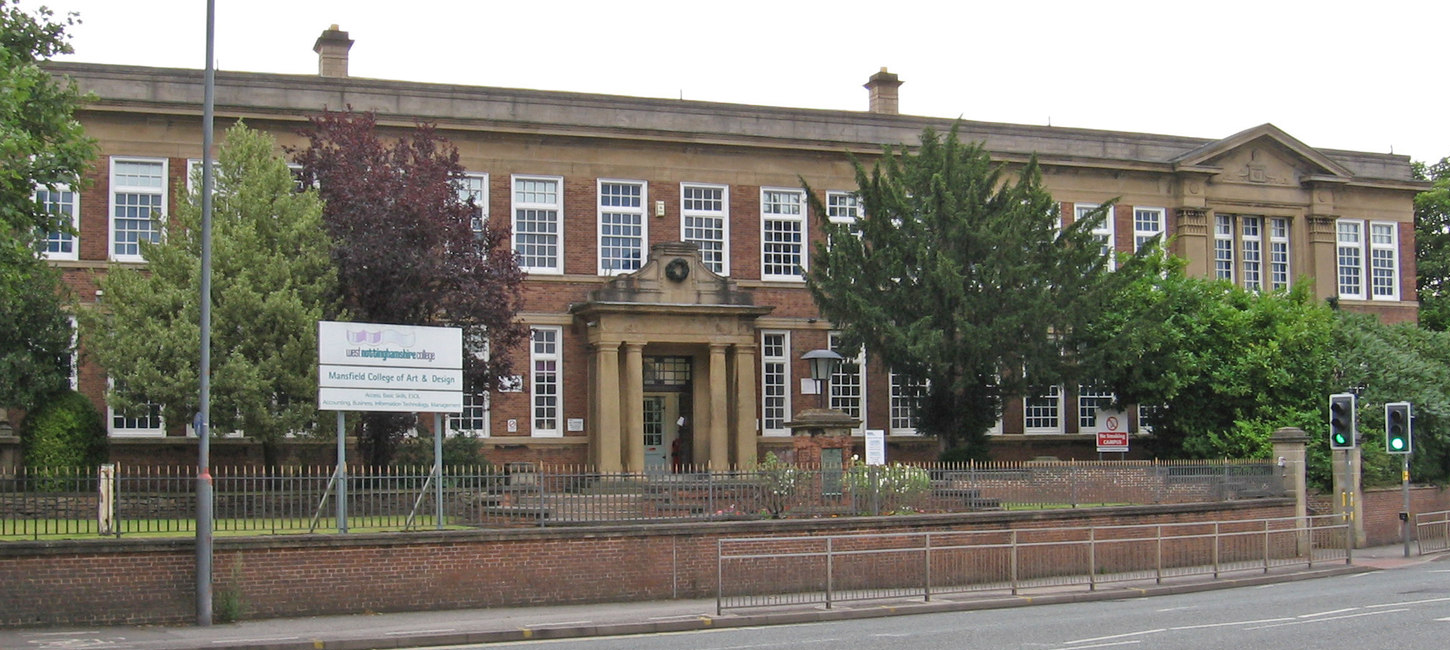
Former Technical and Art College is now Mansfield and Ashfield Sixth Form College, Chesterfield Road South, Mansfield

== Name changes ==
After opening as a newly built Technical College in 1960, the Derby Road site became locally known as Derby Road Tech. West Nottinghamshire College of Further Education was founded in 1976 as the result of a merger of West Nottinghamshire Technical College and Mansfield College of Art (sometimes called College of Arts), previously Mansfield School of Arts.

A change in the law – the Further and Higher Education Act 1992 – allowed colleges to become Incorporated and run semi-autonomously, in this case becoming the Corporation of West Nottinghamshire College, with finances changing from local authority control to that of the Further Education Funding Council in April 1993.

The college renamed itself Vision West Notts in September 2011. Shortly after, however, the college adopted its current trading name of Vision West Nottinghamshire College.

The formal title is West Nottinghamshire College, as cited in the Ofsted report of June 2012, although it is often referred to as 'West Notts College'.

== Campuses ==
As the largest campus, Derby Road offers a wide range of courses and facilities to university-level, and is also home to a 150-seat theatre.

A 'Lifestyle Academy' at Derby Road costing £11m which opened in 2014 offering courses for hairdressing, beauty treatments, holistic therapies and catering, won a Royal Institution of Chartered Surveyors (RICS) award. It is also home to the Vision University Centre which provides Higher Education and professional qualifications.

The Construction Centre at Kirkby-in-Ashfield is a specialist facility providing a training environment for construction students.

The Engineering Innovation Centre at Sutton-in-Ashfield is a specialist hub for students of mechanical and electrical engineering and motor vehicle maintenance at various levels

=== Vision University Centre ===
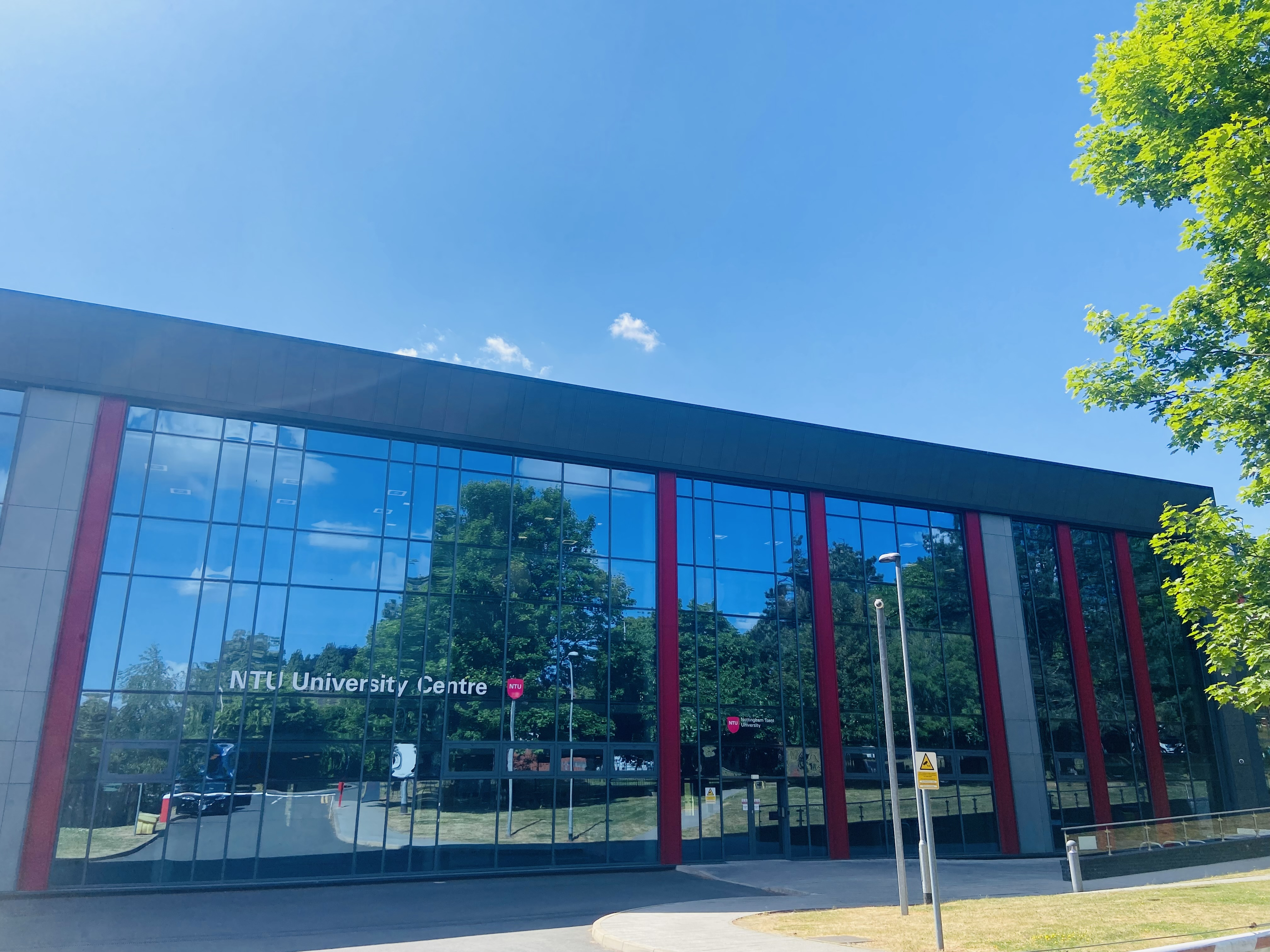
Nottingham Trent University Centre at the Derby Road site

The University Centre, originally affiliated to the University of Derby and Birmingham City University, was created by converting the Sherwood Care building during 2013 at a cost of £30K. Intended as a higher-education (HE) facility, the official opening in February 2014 was conducted by the Duke of Devonshire, the 12th Duke, in his role of Chancellor of the University of Derby.

After approval by local planning department in 2015, a £6.5 million dedicated new building on the Derby Road site was constructed in 2016 to better-enable higher education provision. It was part-funded by a D_{2}N_{2} grant of £2.6 million.

A collaboration with Nottingham Trent University has enabled the College to offer foundation degree courses in several academic, health and technological sectors.

== Vision Studio School ==
First mooted in 2012, in 2013 the college announced a new studio school based at the Chesterfield Road site, to provide education for 300 year 10 to year 13 pupils (ages 14 to 19), with a 9-to-5 working day to mirror commercial practices and having a slant towards work placements and training. In conjunction with the participation of local businesses and organisations, it was intended to be a stepping stone between education and employment. The school was officially opened in 2014 by Lord Karan Bilimoria, and had three principals until its closure in 2017, after an Ofsted report criticising its performance as inadequate in all areas except one, and with pupil numbers falling. The trust running the school commented that it was no longer financially viable to keep it open.

== Financial crisis ==
During 2018, the college suffered a major financial shortfall necessitating emergency government loans of £2.1m and termination of 100 staff. Referring to a report by the Further Education Commissioner, government minister Anne Milton described the situation as a "...serious corporate failure...", needing external administration by the Education and Skills Funding Agency (ESFA). After the resignation of previous Principal Dame Asha Kemkha in October, a new interim Principal and Chief Executive Officer having a background in dealing with struggling colleges was appointed to start in November.

The college issued a statement anticipating further losses of up to 78 non-teaching staff in a bid to save £2.7m, and further expects that by 2019-20 its income will have reduced by £21m compared to 2016-17, due to government reforms changing national apprenticeship funding, with payments being made directly to outside training providers instead of through colleges. Previously, the college benefitted by retaining 20% of the total for managing the schemes. The college established a subsidiary company, Vision Apprentices, in 2010 after 12 organisations nationally were picked to each receive a share of £7m government funding to establish an Apprenticeship Training Association, providing long term placements for 2,550 apprentices with local and national companies. The college has confirmed a commitment to retention of existing courses and quality of tuition for the students and apprentices.

In early 2019, the college confirmed that senior staff were no longer issued with corporate credit cards after the former principal was reported to have claimed in excess of £41K expenses over a three-year period.

== The Inspire and Achieve Foundation ==
In 2009, college principal Asha Khemka established the Inspire & Achieve Foundation, a registered charity to improve the prospects of young people from regeneration areas such as Mansfield.

== Dame Asha Khemka, former Principal ==
Principal Asha Khemka, an OBE since 2009, was awarded a DBE in the New Year Honours list 2014. She was Principal and Chief Executive of West Nottinghamshire College since May 2006, succeeding Di McEvoy-Robinson.

Khemka resigned with immediate effect on 1 October 2018 following a special meeting with the board of governors of the college, which experienced financial difficulties during 2018. Her salary was reported in 2017 as being the third-highest in the field at £275K, compared to £245K for 2014/15 and £229K paid in 2013/14. FE Week reported that Khemka resigned without accepting a financial payout amounting to £130K.

== Royal visit ==
On 20 February 2009, the college's Construction and Skills Logistics Academy was visited by the Prince of Wales, who unveiled a commemorative plaque to mark his visit.

== Alumni ==
- Jason Michael Holland
- Ben Brown, lawyer and former Crown Counsel to the British Overseas Territory of Saint Helena, Ascension and Tristan da Cunha
- Calvin Robinson, Anglican deacon, political commentator, journalist, policy advisor and campaigner
