= Virtual archaeology =

Archaeological sub-discipline

Virtual archaeology is a subfield of digital archeology that creates and use virtual models and simulations of archaeological sites, artifacts, and processes. It makes use of 3D modeling, virtual reality (VR), augmented reality (AR), and other technologies to recreate or visualize archaeological findings.

== Etymology ==
It is a term introduced in 1990 by archaeologist and computer scientist Paul Reilly to describe the use of computer based simulations of archaeological excavations. Since that time, scientific results related to virtual archaeology were annually discussed, among others, at Computer Applications and Quantitative Methods in Archaeology (CAA). The keyword "visualization" defined the aim of the virtual archaeology in the London Charter Initiative:

It should be made clear to users what a computer-based visualization seeks to represent, for example the existing state, an evidence-based restoration or an hypothetical reconstruction of a cultural heritage object or site, and the extent and nature of any factual uncertainty.

— London Charter Initiative (2009)

Since its introduction, the focus of the term has been extended to explore methods that increase the visibility and accessibility of archaeology. Today it serves as an integration paradigm that allows many modern three-dimensional datasets to be analysed together, taking account preliminary reconstructions of archaeological sites and guiding further investigations, for example through archaeological prospection, historical research or excavation. In this iterative and incremental process, the interpretation and virtual representation of results is only one, albeit important, outcome. Consequently, by using 3D printing technologies, results may even be created as physical reality. Such a development was discussed at the first international conference on virtual archaeology, organized by the Department of Eastern Europe and Siberian Archaeology of the State Hermitage Museum, which took place in Saint Petersburg in 2012. A second meeting was held at the State Hermitage Museum in 2015, resulting in a new edited volume, and then in 2018. Next meeting with motto "Revealing the Past, Enriching the Present and Shaping the Future Languages in 2021 was transferred to the Siberian Federal University in Krasnoyarsk.
