= Wallace Group =

- Formation: 2004; 22 years ago
- Founder: Peter Warburton
- Type: Association of United Kingdom-based universities
- Region served: United Kingdom
- Members: 8: University of Bath Cardiff Metropolitan University Durham University University of Edinburgh Loughborough University Northumbria University University of St Andrews University of Stirling
- Key people: Sir David Wallace
- Website: https://www.volunteer-zambia.com/

Locations of Wallace Group universities

The Wallace Group is a grouping of eight universities in the UK that have a shared interest in promoting sports and health workshops in developing countries. The sports which are primarily promoted are football, volleyball, basketball and netball with education workshops focused on HIV & AIDS.

The group was formed in 2004, originally with six universities, in partnership with UK Sport and established itself in 2006. It is named after David Wallace who is affiliated to two member universities. As a group they have worked in collaboration and have shown commitment to the establishment and sustainable practices of International Development. The focus for the group has been Zambia through the partnership with Sport in Action and EduSport. The University of Edinburgh joined in 2018.

== BUCS Ranking ==
The universities participate annually in the British Universities and Colleges Sport Overall Championship, a ranking of around 160 member institutions' sporting achievements. Results for the previous five years are recorded below:

University	BUCS (2024-25)	BUCS (2023-24)	BUCS (2022-23)	BUCS (2021-22)	BUCS (2020-21)^{‡}
Loughborough University	1	1	1	1	*
Durham University	3	3	3	3	*
University of Edinburgh	5	5	5	4	*
University of Bath	7	9	7	7	*
University of Stirling	12	12	13	14	*
University of St Andrews	16	20	18	17	*
Cardiff Metropolitan University	22	21	23	22	*
Northumbria University	23	27	28	28	*

Notes:
^{‡} Suspended due to COVID-19 pandemic
