= Asha Khemka =

India-born educator

Dame Asha Khemka DBE DL (born October 1951, in Sitamarhi, Bihar) is a former educator who resigned as Principal and CEO from West Nottinghamshire College in late 2018 when the college experienced financial difficulties. She joined the college in 2006, succeeding Di McEvoy-Robinson. Prior to her resignation in October 2018 she was one of the highest paid in the sector.

== Honours ==
Khemka was awarded the OBE (Order of the British Empire) as part of 2009 New Year Honours, presented by Elizabeth II, then The Queen, at Buckingham Palace in July 2009. In 2014, she was elevated to Dame Commander of the Order of the British Empire, which was presented by Charles III, then titled Prince of Wales, again at Buckingham Palace.

Khemka is the fourth woman of Indian origin to be awarded a damehood of the Order of the British Empire (DBE or GBE) since the orders were instituted in 1917, following, chronologically, Kaikhusrau Jahan, Begum of Bhopal (1917), Maharani Lakshmi Devi Bai Sahiba of Dhar State (1931), and Indira Patel (2011).

In 2017, she was appointed Deputy Lieutenant of Staffordshire, where she is a long-term resident. In April 2017, she was named Asian Businesswoman of the Year at a ceremony in Birmingham.

== Other awards ==
- National Jewel Award for Excellence in Healthcare and Education, 2007
- Asian Women of Achievement Award, 2008
- Midlands Businesswoman of the Year, 2009
- NRI Welfare Society of India Gold medal for her work in education as a non-resident Indian, 2010
- Inspirational Woman of the Year, Derbyshire and Nottinghamshire Chamber of Commerce, 2011
- Business Personality of the Year, Ashfield and Mansfield Chad, 2011
- Overall Commitment to Apprenticeships (inaugural Asian Apprenticeship Awards, black and minority ethnic Asian community).

== Charity ==
Khemka was the founder of the Inspire and Achieve Foundation, a mentoring organisation intended "...to help troubled, neglected and disadvantaged young people aged 16 to 26...", sometimes known as NEETS – Not in Employment, Education or Training.

== Personal life ==
Khemka is married to Shankar Lal Khemka, a trauma and orthopaedic surgeon. They have three children. She left education in the Bihar area of India at the age 13 and was married at 15. She travelled with her husband to live in the UK during 1978, where she first learned English by watching television and speaking to local people. After being a housewife for 20 years, she returned to education as a mature student, achieving a degree at Cardiff University, then secured her first career-step as a college business studies tutor.

== Controversy and resignation ==
Khemka resigned on 1 October 2018, with 'immediate effect', following a special Board of Governors meeting. The college experienced serious financial irregularities throughout 2018 and prior, and has been placed in 'special measures', having been handed a "Notice To Improve" during July, 2018.

Prior to her resignation, Khemka was one of the highest paid principals/CEOs in the sector, with £275K in 2015/16 and £262K in 2016/17. In early 2019, Khemka was reported to have claimed in excess of £41K expenses over a three-year period. FE Week reported that Khemka resigned without accepting a financial payout amounting to £130K.
