= JISC infoNet =

Jisc infoNet
- Type: Public
- Founded: 2003
- Headquarters: Room 304 Hadrian House, Higham Place, Newcastle upon Tyne, NE1 8AF
- Website: www.jiscinfonet.ac.uk

Jisc infoNet is a service supporting the strategic planning and deployment of technology within the UK Higher Education (HE) and Further Education (FE) sectors. The service is hosted by Northumbria University and is based in Newcastle upon Tyne.

Jisc infoNet was launched as a JISC Advisory Service in January 2003, building on the roots of a HEFCE Good Management Practice project called BISinfoNet. Between 2009 and 2013, Jisc infoNet joined other Jisc Advisory Services and Regional Support Centres in the new not-for-profit company Jisc Advance (the trading name of JISC Services Management Company). As well as Jisc infoNet, other Jisc services include Jisc Digital Media, Jisc Legal, JISCMail, JISC Netskills, Jisc TechDis and Jisc RSC UK.

== Services and Materials ==
Jisc infoNet promotes the effective use of ICT through web-based infoKit resources, institutional exemplars and training workshops. The service provides materials on a range of topics in support of learning, teaching, research and administration.

=== infoKits ===
Jisc infoNet's primary resources are the online infoKits, which include methodologies, tools and techniques, good practice guides and institutional showcases.

=== Case Studies ===
Institutional case studies highlight how practice has been applied in the further and higher education sectors.

=== Workshops ===
Jisc infoNet also run a number of events and workshops to support the online materials.
