= Netskills =

Coordinates: 54.980703°N 1.614105°W

Just Netskills
- Type: Public
- Industry: Education
- Founded: 1995
- Headquarters: Newcastle upon Tyne, United Kingdom
- Products: Workshops, Training materials, Presentations, Qualifications
- Website: http://www.jisc.ac.uk/whatwedo/services/netskills.aspx

Netskills was a training and staff development organisation providing services to help the UK education sector make effective use of technology.

Netskills started in 1995 as a project called 'Network Skills for Users of the Electronic Library' and had the mission 'to help the UK higher education community make effective use of the Internet for teaching, research and administration', which it achieved through workshops on topics including 'An Introduction to the Internet', 'Searching for Information on the World Wide Web' and 'An Introduction to World Wide Web Authoring'.

In 1998 Netskills became a Jisc advisory service, with the new mission 'To be a centre of expertise and knowledge - supporting and enabling the education community to make effective, sustainable use of innovative technology through training, development and consultancy'.

At one stage every university in the UK used the service along with over 400 FE colleges and more than 40 library authorities.

During 2009 Netskills became one of a number of Jisc Advisory services to become part of Jisc Advance. As Jisc Netskills, the service provided a range of training programmes and expertise on topics such as e-learning, web development, social networking, Web 2.0 technologies, information skills and access management.

Some activities were brought in-house by Jisc from 2 January 2015 as part of Jisc Customer Services, nominally marking the closure of the service.

By the end of the project almost 1000 individuals were taking part in Netskills training events every year.

During its time as a Jisc-funded project, Netskills was based at Newcastle University.
