= Head New Media =

Defunct web design agency

- Company type: Arm of Lowes Worldwide, an Interpublic company
- Industry: Web design Interactive television
- Founded: 1997; 28 years ago in the United Kingdom
- Founders: Felix Velarde; Jason Michael Holland
- Defunct: 2001
- Fate: Liquidated

Head New Media was an influential web design and interactive television agency set up in the UK in 1997. In 1998 it became the UK digital arm of the world's fourth largest advertising group Lowe Worldwide, part of Interpublic. The agency was at one point the most awarded in Europe and produced an 'in-house' website Head-Space which won awards including Cannes and in 2011 was listed by Management Today as being one of Ten Websites That Changed the World and a precursor to YouTube. In 1998 the UK's first specialist interactive television creative agency Head End was set up as a wholly owned subsidiary (later acquired by Underwired).

Head New Media's clients included the BBC, Sci-Fi Channel, Unilever (for which the agency produced interactive television advertising on cable operator NTL), Tesco (one of the first interactive TV ads on Flextech), General Motors, Mars Confectionery's Snickers (whose website Snickers MegaBite won a variety of major global advertising awards between 1997-8) and PricewaterhouseCoopers. Its original founders were Felix Velarde and Jason Holland, previously of HyperInteractive (1994–1997) and, following Head New Media's liquidation in 2001, Underwired.

The agency was the subject of a BBC documentary Keeping Creative an episode of The Crunch, made in 1999 by Uden Associates. The documentary is still occasionally broadcast in Europe as part of BBC Worldwide's business education strand.
