= Archaeogaming =

Archaeology of gaming or the use of video games in archaeology

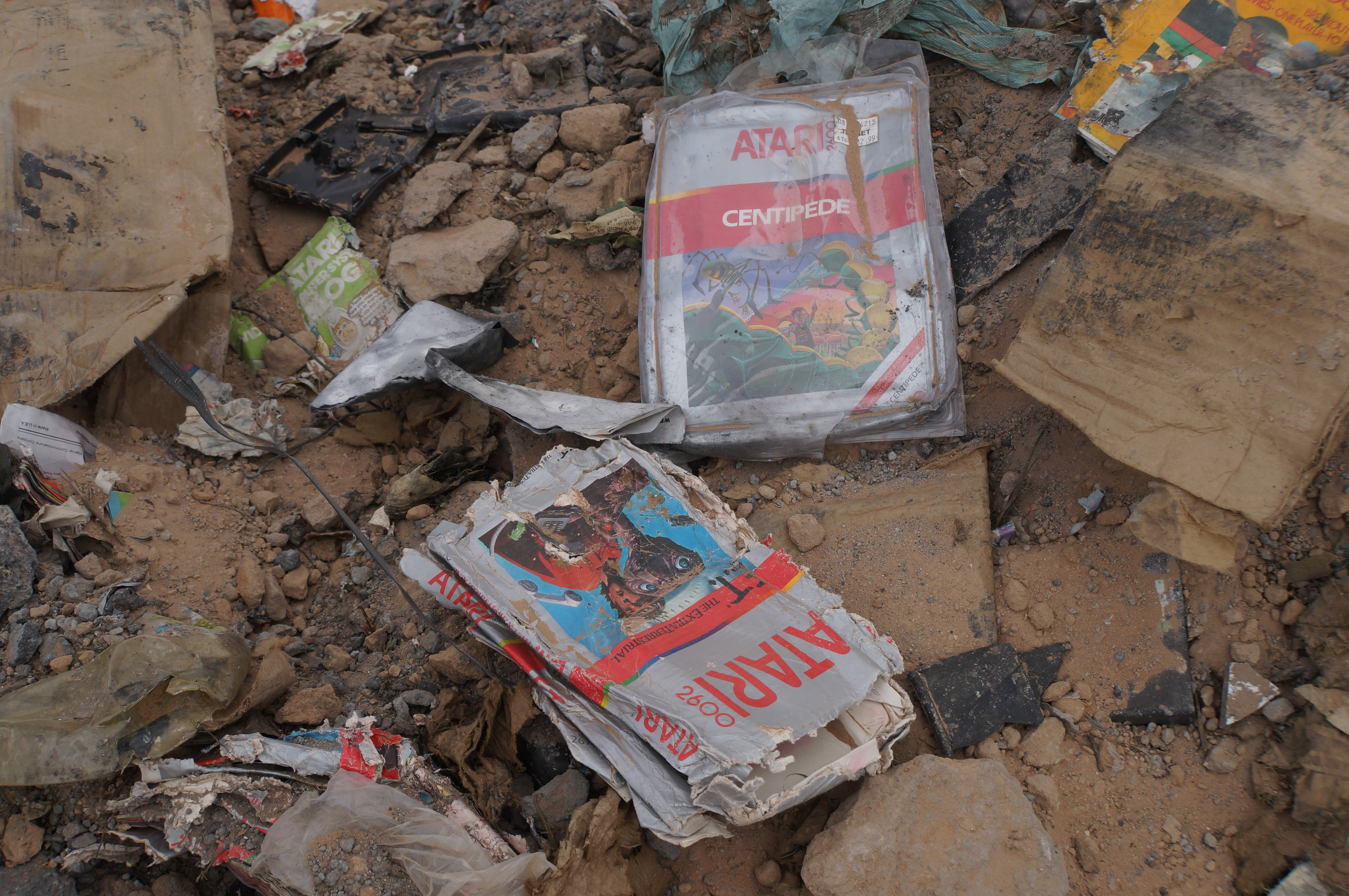
Video games, such as those uncovered from the Atari video game burial, may be archeological artefacts

Archaeogaming is an archaeological framework which is a part of digital archaeology and, broadly speaking, includes the study of archaeology in and of video games as well as the use of video games for archaeological purposes. To this end, the study can include, but is in no means limited to, the physical excavation of video game hardware, the use of archaeological methods within game worlds, the creation of video games for or about archaeological practices and outcomes, or the critical study of how archaeology is represented in video games. Virtual and augmented reality applications in archaeology might also be subsumed within its rubric.

M. Dennis states that archaeogaming is “the utilization and treatment of immaterial space to study created culture, specifically through videogames” which “requires treating a game world, a world bounded and defined by the limitations of its hardware, software and coding choices, as both a closed universe and as an extension of the external culture that created it. Everything that goes into the immaterial space comes from its external cultural source, in one way or another.” Taking this into consideration the archaeogaming framework indicates that there is no functional difference between studying archaeology in the physical, material world, and implementing it with regard to the study, critique and creation of video games for and about archaeology. As such it is said that archaeogaming “requires the same standards of practice as the physical collection of excavated data, only with a different toolset. It also provides the opportunity to use game worlds to reflect on practice, theory and the perceptions of [archaeology].”

In terms of the position of archaeogaming in archaeological theory, Reinhard states; "Archaeogaming breaks with Ian Hodder's postprocessual archaeology (where archaeological interpretations are subjective) by maintaining a positivistic distinction between material and data, but it also takes postprocessualism further by acknowledging at least three actors (the developer, the player, and the player's avatar) as well as three separate contexts that are intertwined (the game media, the player's environment, and the game-space itself)."

== History ==
The first recorded use of the term “archaeogaming” appeared on June 9, 2013, on Andrew Reinhard's blog, in which he discussed the archaeological underpinnings of World of Warcraft and extrapolated that there is the potential to explore the gameplay and construction of these worlds using an archaeological methodology. The term went on to be retroactively applied to work previously carried out within the umbrella of video games and archaeology, for example, the ethnographic investigations conducted by E. Johnson in The Elder Scrolls V: Skyrim. The term has been developed by various academics since the first inception and development is ongoing. Though Reinhard is credited with first applying the term to this study it is noted here that many other academic enquiries have previously tackled the topic under different names such as gaming archaeology and game-archaeology.

== Types of archaeogaming ==
There are many forms or subcategories within the wider archaeogaming discipline, ranging from the study of the material culture of video games through to the creation of video games as a means to think about or represent archaeological practices, processes or outcomes. The core categories will be discussed in turn below.

=== Archaeology of video games (real-world excavation) ===
The archaeology of video games in the physical world entails the excavation of material culture using conventional and specialist archaeogaming methodologies. Excavation of the Atari video game burial, which uncovered E.T. the Extra-Terrestrial cartridges from a New Mexico landfill, is an example of this form of archaeogaming.

=== Archaeology in video games (digital excavation) ===
The archaeogaming sub-category of digital excavation refers to using archaeological methods to dig into how video games operate. An example of this method can be found in J. Aycock's use of computer science methods to explore the construction and implementation of features within video games. Douglas Heaven wrote about the archaeology of rubbish/garbage within virtual worlds for New Scientist. The June 2016 release of No Man's Sky also saw the launch of the No Man's Sky Archaeological Survey, the first formal archaeology project undertaken within a procedurally created universe.

=== Critical examination of archaeology and cultural heritage in video games ===
The critical study of how archaeology has, could and should be used in video games is perhaps the broadest and most widely represented subcategory of the archaeogaming group in academic and popular literature. Proponents of this sector discuss how archaeology has been represented in externally produced games and construct frameworks which aim to develop better representations of archaeological material, practices and outputs.

Cultural heritage is also explored in an archaeological way via archaeogaming, from critical reviews of games such as Subnautica and Never Alone, to online playthroughs of games such as Far Cry Primal by professors and students of archaeology.

Depictions of Cultural Heritage in video games have been critically assessed by archaeological experts, done as an analysis of archaeological practices & to review the accuracy of their depiction. Such as the God of War videogame franchise.

Contributors have also explored aspects of game design and creation in relation to the discipline of archaeogaming, exposing parallels in the development of titles like the Day of the Tentacle remaster to the archaeological process.

=== Creating archaeological video games ===
There are two key branches within this sub-grouping: the practice of creating video games which represent archaeological material, practices or processes or the creation of video games to serve archaeological needs. The former of these categories can be seen in the production of games for museums, exhibitions or online sites, usually with the express aim of educating or informing an audience. The latter of the categories focuses on how video games, as a media form, can be used to supplement, overcome or provide novel methods for recording, expressing or communicating archaeology for academic purposes.

== Media reception ==
Archaeogaming began receiving global attention upon the publication of an August 2015 article on Vice Motherboard by Kathleen Caulderwood, "The Archaeologist Who Studies World of Warcraft." The story received wider circulation courtesy of a follow-up piece on the video game site Kotaku, "Actual Archaeologist is Digging through World of Warcraft, Skyrim." Guokr, a Chinese science and technology news site reported on archaeogaming shortly thereafter, followed by German technology site Technology Review.

Archaeogaming has been the subject of two national radio broadcasts in Canada and Ireland, first on CBC's Spark radio program with Nora Young, "'We're kind of making it up as we go along': What it's like to be a video game archaeologist" and then on Ireland's Lyric FM Culture File with Eleanor Flegg, "What is Archaeogaming?"

== Subsequent developments ==
In April, 2016, a group of academics gathered at Leiden University, Netherlands, as part of the VALUE conference on interactive pasts. The purpose of this conference was to present current research, engage in critical discussion of archaeology and video games and to develop a manifesto for the development of the necessary theoretical, methodological and practice based frameworks involved under the broad term of archaeogaming. The core tenets of the first draft of the manifesto (1.0) are as follows:

- To create a common language for describing the intersection between archaeology and video games
- To develop the methodological, practice-based and theoretical paradigms required for effective analysis, critique and development
- To develop effective methods for communicating with the game development industry regarding the use of archaeological entities
- To develop ethical frameworks for engaging with archaeological material within video games
- To curate and provide data-sets, information and modes of communication which are accessible to developers wishing to access archaeological material
- To develop platforms whereby the public can access integral archaeological information about and for video games
- To preserve games, game culture and game history using appropriate archaeological method and theory
- To approach the study of the public perception of archaeology in / of video games as well as their surrounding culture (including conventions, cosplays, fanart etc.) with due care and appropriate methodological approaches.
- To engage with the development history, the developer culture and the impact which this has on the game development practice through an archaeological lens
- To develop the field of archaeogaming on an academic, public and industry level through effective knowledge sharing, centralization and open information.

== Bibliography ==
- Caraher, B., R. Guins, R. Rothaus, A. Reinhard, B. Weber. 2014. Why We Dug Atari. Online Resource: https://www.theatlantic.com/technology/archive/2014/08/why-we-dug-atari/375702/. Last Accessed 04/05/2016.
- Caulderwood, K. 2015. The Archaeologist Who Studies World of Warcraft. Online Resource: https://www.vice.com/en/article/the-archaeologist-who-studies-world-of-warcraft/. Last Accessed 04/05/2016.
- Dennis, M. 2016. Archaeogaming. Online Resource: http://gingerygamer.com/index.php/archaeogaming/. Last Accessed 02/05/2016.
- Flegg, E. What is Archaeogaming. Lyric FM Culture File. Online Resource: https://soundcloud.com/soundsdoable/culture-file-archeogaming-part. Last Accessed 04/05/2016.
- Flegg, E. Archaeology in No Man's Sky. Lyric FM Culture File. Online Resource: https://soundcloud.com/soundsdoable/culture-file-archeogaming. Last Accessed 04/05/2016.
- García-Raso, D. 2017. Yacimiento píxel. Los videojuegos como cultura material. JAS Arqueología Editorial, Madrid.
- Heaven, D. 2015. What Digital Trash Dumped in Games Tells Us about the Players. Online Resource: https://www.newscientist.com/article/dn28505-what-digital-trash-dumped-in-games-tells-us-about-the-players/. Last Accessed 04/05/2016.
- Johnson, E. 2013. Experienced Archaeologies: A mini-ethnography exploring the way in which people engage with the past in single player role-playing videogames. Masters Thesis: University of York.
- Lepies, J. 2015. Eine Vorbereitung auf von Maschinen erstellte Kulturen. Online Resource: http://www.heise.de/tr/artikel/Eine-Vorbereitung-auf-von-Maschinen-erstellte-Kulturen-2813007.html. Last Accessed 04/05/2016.
- Plunkett, L. 2015. Actual Archaeologist is Digging through World of Warcraft, Skyrim. Online Resource: http://kotaku.com/actual-archaeologist-is-digging-through-world-of-warcra-1724001740. Last Accessed 04/05/2016.
- Reinhard, A. 2013. What is Archaeogaming? Online Resource: https://archaeogaming.com/2013/06/09/what-is-archaeogaming/. Last Accessed 02/05/2016.
- Reinhard, A. 2015. Review of Never Alone [game]. INTERNET ARCHAEOLOGY 38. Online Resource: doi:10.11141/ia.38.6. Last Accessed 04/05/2016.
- Reinhard, A. 2016. Excavating Atari: Where the Media was the Archaeology. JOURNAL OF CONTEMPORARY ARCHAEOLOGY, VOL 2, NO 1.
- Reinhard, Andrew (2018). Archaeogaming: An Introduction to Archaeology in and of Video Games. Brooklyn, New York: Berghahn Books. ISBN 978-1-78533-872-4.
- Silver, C. 2015. Archaeology of Video Games. Online Resource: http://ancienthistory.about.com/od/Digital-Humanities/fl/Archaeology-of-video-games.htm. Last Accessed 04/05/2016.
- VALUE GROUP. 2016. Interactive Pasts Conference. Online Resource: https://web.archive.org/web/20160426030250/http://www.valueproject.nl/blog-posts/other/introducing-the-interactive-pasts-conference/. Last Accessed 02/05/2016.
- York Archaeology Professors Play Far Cry Primal. 2016. Online Resource: https://www.york.ac.uk/archaeology/news-and-events/news/external/news-2016/far-cry-primal/. Last Accessed 04/05/2016.
- Young, N. 2015. "We're Kind of Making it up as we Go Along": What it's like to be a Video Game Archaeologist. CBC Radio, Spark. Online Resource: http://www.cbc.ca/radio/spark/295-street-psychology-game-archaeology-and-more-1.3240890/we-re-kind-of-making-it-up-as-we-go-along-what-it-s-like-to-be-a-video-game-archaeologist-1.3248856. Last Accessed 04/05/2016.
- 发表于. 2015. 在游戏里考古的考古学家？不仅玩游戏，而且做学术！Online Resource: http://www.guokr.com/article/440676/. Last Accessed 04/05/2016.
