= Digital Archaeology (exhibition) =

Internet exhibition

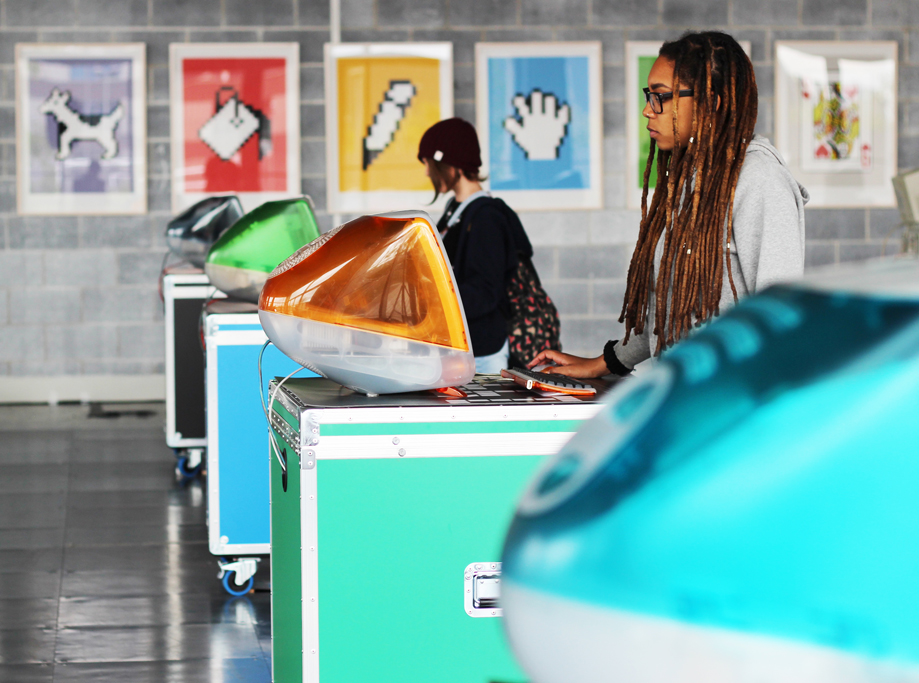
Exhibition at HereEast 2017

Digital Archaeology, unveiled in London as part of Internet Week Europe 2010, was described as 'the first ever archaeological dig of the Internet'. The event showcased a selection of groundbreaking websites from the early days of the web, congruously displayed on the hardware and software they were designed on and for.

== History ==
The Digital Archaeology exhibition, organised by Jim Boulton, made its debut at Internet Week Europe 2010. The show celebrates the golden era of the website but more importantly, it seeks to document the formative years of digital culture and raise the profile of web archiving.

The debut exhibition showcased 15 groundbreaking websites and featured a keynote presentation by Helen Hockx-Yu, Web Archiving Programme Manager at The British Library. Such was the level of interest, Boulton was invited to run it again at Internet Week New York 2011 in an expanded format, where it attracted 12,000 visitors. The New York show was sponsored by Google and featured a keynote presentation by Abigail Grotke, Web Archiving Team Lead at the Library of Congress. The event was held again, in a reduced form, as part of Digital Shoreditch 2013, where it was visited by the team at CERN responsible for restoring the first website.

In 2014, Digital Archaeology featured as a key part of a larger exhibition, called Digital Revolution debuting at The Barbican and then going on tour to Athens, Istanbul, Stockholm and Beijing.

Its next outing was in 2017 at HereEast, in the Queen Elizabeth Olympic Park. In 2021, it appeared in Cambridge's Grand Arcade in partnership with Raspberry Pi and The Centre for Computing History.

Curator Jim Boulton said of the importance of the event "Today, when almost a quarter of the earth's population is online, this artistic, commercial and social history is being wiped from the face of the earth. Unless we act now to archive our recent digital past, we are in real danger of losing the building blocks of the web that have so shaped modern culture."
