= German School London =

School in Petersham, London

- Deutsche Schule London
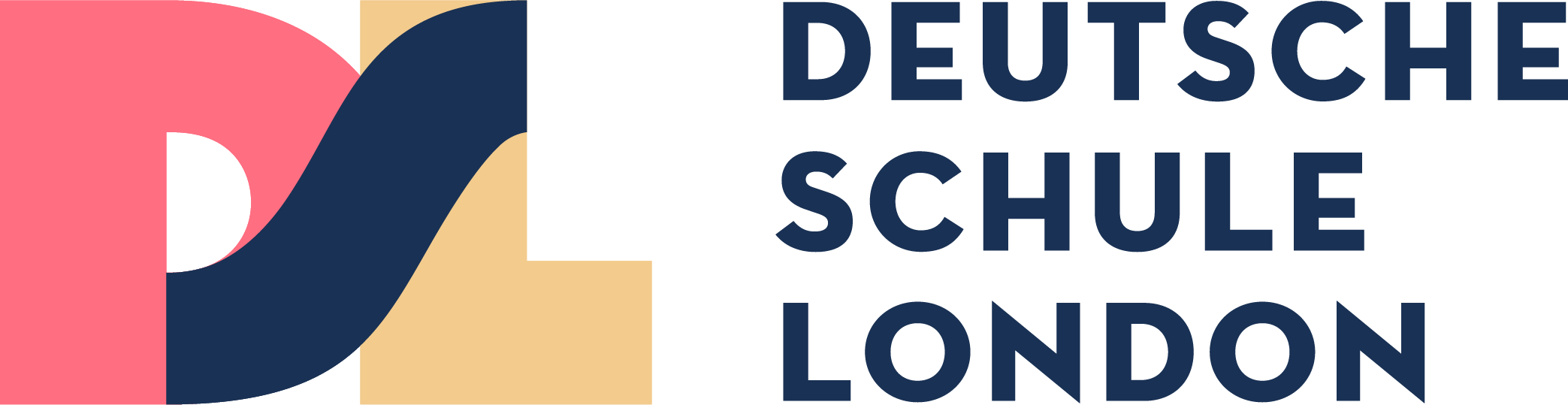

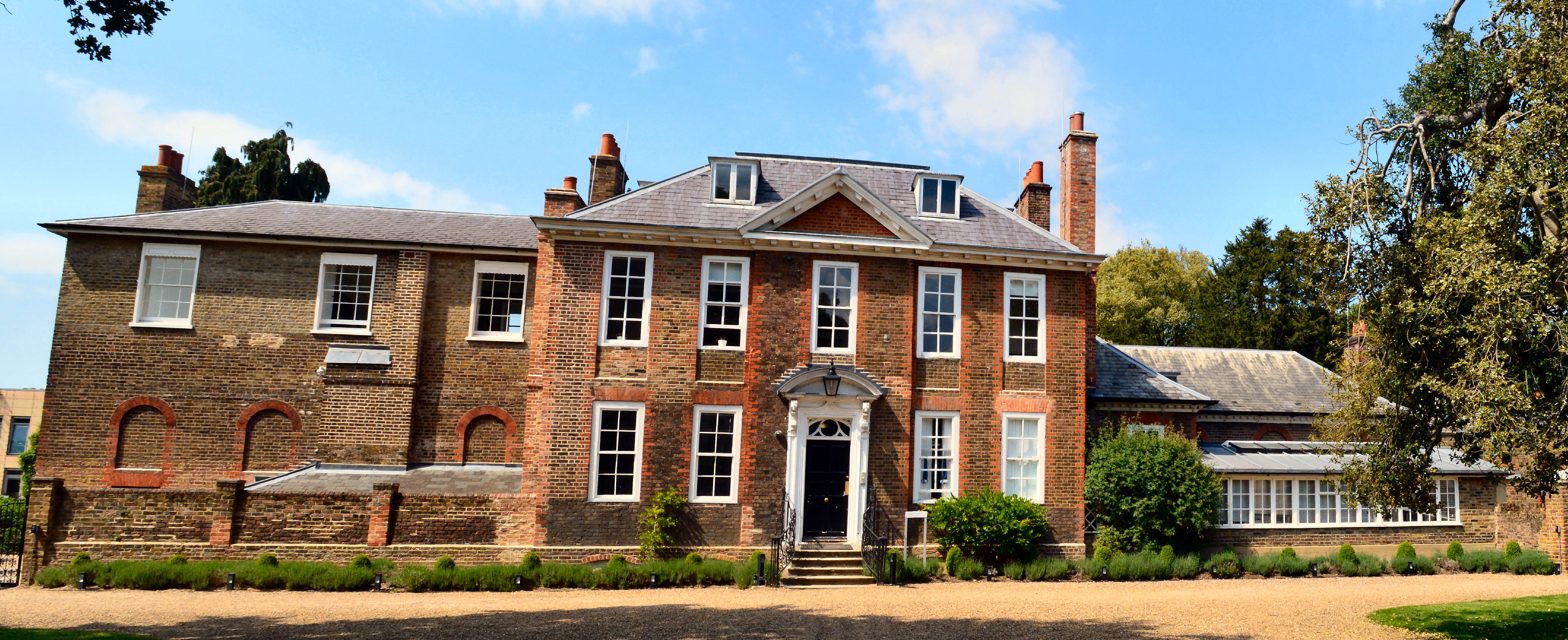

Location
- Douglas House; Petersham Road; Petersham, Greater London, TW10 7AH; England; 51.445134°N 0.305081°W

Information
- Type: International school
- Established: 1971; 55 years ago
- Department for Education URN: 102945 Tables
- Ofsted: Reports
- Chair: Jan Peter Weiland
- Head teacher: Oliver Schmitz
- Gender: Mixed
- Age: 3 to 19
- Enrolment: approx. 890
- Language: German
- Accreditations: Deutsche Auslandsschule (Abitur programme); IBO (IB Diploma Programme)
- Website: www.dslondon.org.uk

The German School London (German: Deutsche Schule London; often referred to in both languages by its German abbreviation DSL) is an independent school based in the grounds of Douglas House in Petersham in the London Borough of Richmond upon Thames. Founded in 1971, today it serves a student body of over 800, from kindergarten to the end of high school.

The German School London is one of approximately 140 schools that the Federal Republic of Germany established internationally to promote the German culture and language in other countries, and is accredited by the German government's Central Agency for German Schools Abroad, as a "Deutsche Auslandsschule" ("German School Abroad").

The German School London offers a bilingual system where, in addition to completing the German Abitur, students can also choose to graduate with an International Baccalaureate Diploma.

== History ==
The Federal Republic of Germany bought Douglas House and grounds in 1969, and built a school around it, with the house itself becoming the reception and administrative offices. The school opened in September 1971, with 84 students. The school was founded to primarily serve children of diplomatic staff from the embassies of German-speaking countries (West Germany, Austria, and Switzerland), while some expatriate children were enrolled.

== Campus ==
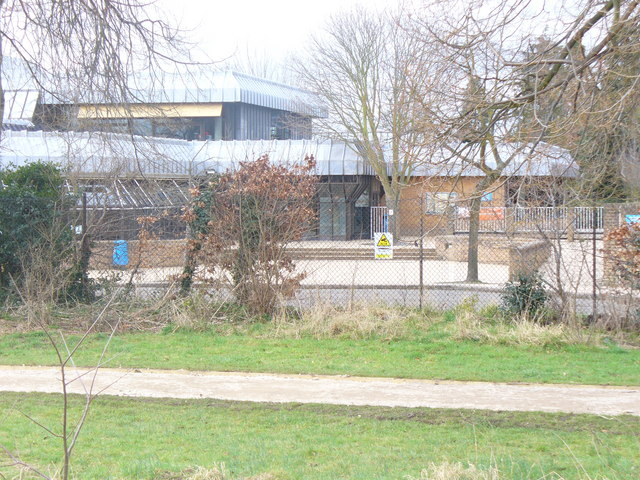
Modern buildings at the German School

The school consists of four main buildings – a building for the upper and middle school, a newly established building for the elementary school, a building for pre-school and kindergarten, and a sports building including a gym, a swimming pool, and changing rooms.

Additional school buildings, designed by the German firm Kersten Mertinoff & Struhk, were erected in the grounds between 1972 and 1983. The executive architects were W H Marmorek and Clifford Culpin & Partners. Douglas House was placed on the Grade II* listed buildings list in 1983. Further contemporary buildings have been constructed on the campus, including a building for computer studies in 2000 and a new sports hall in 2017.

== Curriculum ==
The school largely follows the curriculum of German state (Bundesland) Baden-Württemberg. English is taught from the first year. The aim is for students to be fully bilingual when they graduate from the school, so as to be equally equipped to attend either German-speaking or English-speaking universities.

=== Kindergarten and pre-school ===
The bilingual (Note: German and English are both used."Kindergarten & Preschool". Deutsche Schule London. Archived from the original on 27 June 2013.) kindergarten and pre-school focus on preparing the children for elementary school, and helping them develop self-confidence and independence. Since July 2013 the school has been exempt from the British EYFS (Early Years Foundation Stage) learning and development requirements and is now guided by Baden-Württemberg's curriculum.

=== Elementary school ===
The curriculum in the elementary school consists of German, English, mathematics, social studies & sciences, music, arts, religion and physical education.

=== Middle school and upper school ===
In middle and upper school students study 10 to 13 subjects – German, English, French or Latin, mathematics, physics, chemistry, music, arts, religion or ethics, history, geography and politics. Students can choose to study Spanish as an additional language. The school offers a broad and differentiated education with bilingual units for different talents, and prepares students for university.

=== Qualifications ===
Students in Years 11 and 12 can, if they wish, study for both the International Baccalaureate and the German Abitur. The school has offered the International Baccalaureate since 2010; it is taught in English, although students who take German as an A1 language can graduate with a "bilingual IB Diploma".

== School life ==
The school provides networking opportunities for adults from the German community. Much of the community's social activities and sporting clubs for Germans are organised around the school, which "provides a forum for the expression of Germanness".

=== Sport and the arts ===
Teams from the school have taken part in international sporting events in soccer, basketball, volleyball, badminton and tennis, often playing against teams from other international schools in the UK, and sometimes in tournaments against international schools across Europe. Students also take part in school concerts and in the Jugend musiziert competition, an international music competition in Germany between children and young people held at regional, federal and national level.

=== School exchanges ===
The school operates a programme of school exchange visits, where the students visit a different school for a day and participate in the classes, and family exchange visits where they meet their exchange partner on a Friday afternoon and spend time with them and their family until the Saturday. There are also programmes for students in Years 10, 11 and 12, where they visit the Russell School to teach the German language and culture to Year 5 students.

=== School charity ===
The school has its own charity group, DSLaktiv – Schüler für Schüler, founded in 2010. Every year students in the group choose a different charity to support and organise activities and projects to fundraise for it.

=== School events ===
As well as teaching the German curriculum the school promotes German culture. Every school year there are readings by prominent German authors and poets, and performances by musicians. The school has a Frühlingsfest and Oktoberfest celebrations, as well as Weihnachtsmarkt, a Christmas fair. There are also regular Frühschoppen events.

== Faculty and staff ==
The German School's teaching staff consists of local teachers with German and English backgrounds, and teachers from Germany who are seconded by the German Government.

== Operations ==
The School Association's Board, an unpaid group that operates the school, determines the school's financial, economic and legal business, as well as budgeting and personnel matters.

== See also ==
- Douglas House, Petersham
- Germans in the United Kingdom

=== Other international schools in London ===
- International Community School
- Marymount International School
- Southbank International School
- Lycée Français Charles de Gaulle
- The American School in London
- Japanese School in London
- The Norwegian School in London
- The Swedish School in London

=== Other German "Auslandsschulen" in European capitals ===
- Internationale Deutsche Schule Paris, France
- St Kilian's German School, Ireland
- German School of Athens, Greece
- Deutsche Schule Lissabon, Portugal
- Deutsche Schule Madrid, Spain

== Sources ==
- Moore, Fiona (2012). "The German School in London, UK: Fostering the Next Generation of National Cosmopolitans?" (Chapter 4) in Coles, Anne and Fechter, Anne-Meike (editors). Gender and Family Among Transnational Professionals (Routledge International Studies of Women and Place). Routledge. ISBN 1134156200, 9781134156207.
