= International Community School =

International Community School may refer to:

- International Community School (Kirkland, Washington), US
- International Community School (Singapore)
- International Community School of Addis Ababa, Ethiopia
- International Community School (UK), London
- International Community School (Thailand), Bangkok
