= London Irish (disambiguation) =

London Irish is an English rugby union club.

London Irish may also refer to:

- Arsenal F.C., English football club associated with the Irish community in London, particularly in the 1970s and 80s
- London Irish Amateur, an amateur rugby union club affiliated to London Irish
- London Irish Rifles, a former volunteer rifle regiment of the British Army, now part of the London Regiment
- London Irish (TV series), a 2013 sitcom TV series about young Irish people living in London
- Irish people in London; see Ethnic groups in London#Irish
