= National Heritage List for England =

Register of historic buildings and sites

The National Heritage List for England (NHLE) is England's official database of protected heritage assets. It includes details of all listed buildings, scheduled monuments, registered historic parks and gardens, protected shipwrecks, and registered battlefields. The list is maintained by Historic England, a government body, and consolidates these different designations into a single resource, even though they vary in the type of legal protection they afford. Although World Heritage Sites are not designated by Historic England, they also appear on the NHLE. Conservation areas, however, do not appear, as they are designated by the relevant local planning authority.

The passage of the Ancient Monuments Protection Act 1882 established the first element of what is now the list, granting protection to 50 prehistoric monuments. Subsequent amendments to the act increased the level of protection and added more monuments. Beginning in 1948, the Town and Country Planning Acts introduced the concept of listed buildings and the process for adding properties to the list. As of 2024, more than 401,000 properties are individually listed. Each year, additional properties are added to the national list through the registers that comprise it.

The NHLE was launched in 2011 as the statutory list of all designated historic places, including listed buildings and scheduled monuments.

The list is managed by Historic England (formerly part of English Heritage) and is available as an online database. Each entry is assigned a unique NHLE reference number, which is often used to identify the corresponding database record; for example, 1285296 refers to Douglas House, a Grade II* listed building in the London Borough of Richmond upon Thames.

Since 2022 at least the text (but not maps) of the NHLE has been available under the Open Government Licence 3.0.

== See also ==
- Local heritage list
- List of heritage registers
