= Ethnic groups in London =

London, the capital of England and the United Kingdom, has become one of the most ethnically diverse and multicultural cities in the world.

Greater London had a population of 8,899,375 at the 2021 census. Around 41% of its population were born outside the UK, and over 300 languages are spoken in the region.

== History and ethnic breakdown of London ==
Population pyramid of London by ethnicity in 2021

Ethnic makeup of London over time in age groups

For the overwhelming majority of London's history, the population of the city was ethnically homogeneous with the population being of White British ethnic origin, with small clusters of minority groups such as Jewish people, most notably in areas of the East End. From 1948 onwards, the population has diversified in international terms at an increased rate. In 2011, it was reported for the first time that White British demographic had become a minority, whilst still being the largest single demographic within the city, establishing it was a majority-minority city within the country. In 2005, a survey of London's ethnic and religious diversity claimed that there were more than 300 languages spoken and 50 non-indigenous communities with a population of more than 10,000 in London.

Ethnic Group	Year													
Ethnic Group	1961 estimations		1971 estimations		1981 estimations		1991 census		2001 census		2011 census		2021 census	
Ethnic Group	Number	%	Number	%	Number	%	Number	%	Number	%	Number	%	Number	%
White: Total	7,602,233	97.7%	6,901,596	92.6%	5,893,973	86.6%	5,333,580	79.80%	5,103,203	71.15%	4,887,435	59.79%	4,731,172	53.8%
White: British (Note: New category created for the 2001 census)	–	–	6,500,000	87%	–	–	–	–	4,287,861	59.79%	3,669,284	44.89%	3,239,281	36.8%
White: Irish	–	–	401,596	5.4%	–	–	256,470	3.83%	220,488	3.07%	175,974	2.15%	156,333	1.8%
White: Gypsy or Irish Traveller (Note: New category created for the 2011 census)	–	–	401,596	5.4%	–	–	–	–	–	–	8,196	0.1%	7,031	0.1%
White: Roma	–	–	401,596	5.4%	–	–	–	–	–	–	–	–	37,689	0.4%
White: Other	–	–	401,596	5.4%	–	–	–	–	594,854	8.29%	1,033,981	12.65%	1,290,838	14.7%
Asian or Asian British: Total	–	–	–	–	425,426	6.3%	690,031	10.33%	946,894	13.20%	1,511,546	18.49%	1,817,640	20.8%
Asian or Asian British: Indian	–	–	–	–	232,881	–	347,091	5.19%	436,993	6.09%	542,857	6.64%	656,272	7.5%
Asian or Asian British: Pakistani	–	–	–	–	59,440	–	87,816	1.31%	142,749	1.99%	223,797	2.74%	290,549	3.3%
Asian or Asian British: Bangladeshi	–	–	–	–	41,792	–	85,738	1.28%	153,893	2.15%	222,127	2.72%	322,054	3.7%
Asian or Asian British: Chinese (Note: In 2001, listed under the 'Other ethnic group' heading.)	–	–	–	–	35,938	–	56,579	0.84%	80,201	1.12%	124,250	1.52%	147,520	1.7%
Asian or Asian British: Other Asian	–	–	–	–	55,375	–	112,807	1.68%	133,058	1.86%	398,515	4.88%	401,245	4.6%
Black or Black British: Total	–	–	–	–	405,394	6%	535,216	8.01%	782,849	10.92%	1,088,640	13.32%	1,188,370	13.5%
Black or Black British: African	–	–	–	–	102,230	–	163,635	2.44%	378,933	5.28%	573,931	7.02%	697,054	7.9%
Black or Black British: Caribbean	–	–	–	–	239,956	–	290,968	4.35%	343,567	4.79%	344,597	4.22%	345,405	3.9%
Black or Black British: Other Black	–	–	–	–	63,208	–	80,613	1.20%	60,349	0.84%	170,112	2.08%	145,911	1.7%
Mixed or British Mixed: Total	–	–	–	–	–	–	–	–	226,111	3.15%	405,279	4.96%	505,775	5.7%
Mixed: White and Black Caribbean	–	–	–	–	–	–	–	–	70,928	0.99%	119,425	1.46%	132,555	1.5%
Mixed: White and Black African	–	–	–	–	–	–	–	–	34,182	0.48%	65,479	0.80%	77,341	0.9%
Mixed: White and Asian	–	–	–	–	–	–	–	–	59,944	0.84%	101,500	1.24%	125,188	1.4%
Mixed: Other Mixed	–	–	–	–	–	–	–	–	61,057	0.85%	118,875	1.45%	170,691	1.9%
Other: Total	–	–	–	–	80,793	1.2%	120,872	1.81%	113,034	1.58%	281,041	3.44%	556,768	6.3%
Other: Arab	–	–	–	–	–	–	–	–	–	–	106,020	1.30%	139,791	1.6%
Other: Any other ethnic group	–	–	–	–	–	–	–	–	113,034	1.58%	175,021	2.14%	416,977	4.7%
Non-White: Total	179,109	2.3%	547,588	7.4%	911,626	13.5%	1,346,119	20.2%	2,068,888	28.85%	3,286,506	40.2%	4,068,553	46.2%
Total	7,781,342	100%	7,449,184	100%	6,805,599	100%	6,679,699	100.00%	7,172,091	100.00%	8,173,941	100.00%	8,799,725	100%

Distribution of ethnic groups in Greater London according to the 2011 census.
White

Asian

Black

White-British

White-Irish

White-Other

Asian-Indian

Asian-Pakistani

Asian-Bangladeshi

Asian-Chinese

Black-African

Black-Caribbean

Other-Arab

== Racial breakdown of London ==
=== White population of London ===
At the 2021 census, the total White population of London stood at 3.2 million.

As of the 2011 census:					
	White British Population	White Irish Population	White Gypsy/Irish Traveller Population	Other White Population	Total White Population
Inner London	1,130,882	66,808	1,946	534,723	1,853,209
Outer London	2,429,018	100,809	5,141	499,258	3,034,226
London	3,669,284	175,974	8,196	1,033,981	4,887,435

Whites form a majority of London's population and are evenly spread. Bromley has the highest White British population as well as highest total White, while Newham has the lowest for both. Camden has the highest White Irish population, while Bexley has the highest White Gypsy/Irish Traveller population and Haringey has the highest for Other White (non-British/Irish/Gypsy/Irish Traveller white).

The table below shows the population by numbers in the top 20 boroughs as reported in the 2021 census.

Rank	London Borough	Population				
Rank	London Borough	White British	White Irish	White Gypsy or Irish Traveller	Other White	Total White
1	Bromley	219,493	4,954	578	26,719	251,744
2	Barnet	140,777	7,644	179	74,608	223,208
3	Wandsworth	157,048	8,061	163	55,131	220,360
4	Havering	174,232	2,894	259	19,496	196,881
5	Croydon	146,268	4,935	212	36,450	187,865
6	Bexley	158,824	2,528	620	14,872	176,862
7	Westminster	119,395	6,828	146	46,872	173,241
8	Enfield	103,140	5,969	374	61,280	170,763
9	Greenwich	119,665	4,230	385	35,844	160,124
10	Islington	89,261	8,511	248	59,009	157,033
11	Richmond upon Thames	123,093	4,886	85	22,667	156,711
12	Kingston upon Thames	109,253	6,024	156	41,208	156,641
13	Haringey	88,424	6,997	370	58,552	154,343
14	Lewisham	111,726	5,055	116	36,819	153,716
15	Hillingdon	113,377	5,585	479	27,255	146,696
16	Waltham Forest	94,766	4,230	198	46,433	145,627
17	Sutton	120,014	3,118	130	19,562	142,824
18	Ealing	86,092	7,062	108	40,634	133,796
19	Camden	74,348	9,314	128	44,285	128,075
20	Lambeth	57,162	3,742	49	50,276	111,229

=== Afro-Caribbean and African population of London ===
At the 2021 census, the total Afro-Caribbean and African population of London stood at 1.5 million This is a rise of 1.8% from the 2011 census, when the population stood at 990,000.

Inner London and Outer London have a near-equal Afro-Caribbean and African population. The 2011 census is the first time that the Afro-Caribbean and African population population in Outer London has overtaken that of Inner London:

	Black African Population	Black Caribbean Population	Other Black Population	Total Black Population
Inner London	291,331	186,256	95,350	572,937
Outer London	288,892	163,826	76,033	528,751
London	580,223	350,082	171,383	1,101,688

The black population of London is noticeably concentrated in South London, with the four boroughs with the highest black populations overall all south of the river, and Greenwich also featuring inside the top 10. Southwark has the highest African population, Croydon has the highest Afro-Caribbean population, and Lambeth has the highest total black population in London. In Southwark, Greenwich and Newham, the African population is significantly higher than Afro-Caribbean; conversely, Lewisham and Brent are almost balanced, and Croydon is the only borough where the Afro-Caribbean (Jamaican, Trinidadian, Barbadian, Guyanese and other Afro-Caribbean) population nearly exceeds the African one (Nigerian, Somali, Ugandan, Sierra Leonean and other African groups.

The twenty London boroughs with the highest total Afro-Caribbean and African population (Black African, Black Caribbean and Other Black) are listed below:

Rank	London Borough	Population			
Rank	London Borough	Black African	Black Caribbean	Other Black	Total Black
1	Croydon	40,219	36,108	12,114	88,441
2	Lewisham	37,834	31,883	10,756	80,473
3	Southwark	48,320	18,156	10,823	77,511
4	Lambeth	37,359	28,991	9,795	76,145
5	Newham	40,874	13,586	6,842	61,302
6	Enfield	36,463	16,990	7,059	60,512
7	Brent	31,070	21,258	7,167	59,495
8	Hackney	29,478	17,903	7,264	54,645
9	Greenwich	35,164	8,051	5,440	48,655
10	Haringey	23,037	18,087	6,706	47,830
11	Barking and Dagenham	35,101	5,824	5,882	46,807
12	Waltham Forest	18,759	17,587	5,301	41,647
13	Ealing	22,578	12,898	4,015	39,491
14	Wandsworth	17,330	11,356	4,376	33,062
15	Barnet	22,670	4,951	3,031	30,651
16	Islington	18,091	7,368	3,284	28,743
17	Redbridge	14,573	8,452	3,071	26,096
18	Hammersmith and Fulham	13,234	6,626	2,584	22,453
19	Merton	12,218	7,632	3,037	22,887
20	Hillingdon	15,844	5,752	2,359	23,955

=== Asian population of London ===
At the 2011 census, the total Asian population of London stood at 1,511,546. This is a rise of 60% from the 2001 census, when the population stood at 947,425.

Outer London has a greater Asian population than Inner London:

	Indian Population	Pakistani Population	Bangladeshi Population	Chinese Population	Other Asian Population	Total Asian Population
Inner London	109,933	59,890	163,838	65,983	115,549	515,193
Outer London	432,924	163,907	58,289	58,267	282,966	996,353
London	542,857	223,797	222,127	124,250	398,515	1,511,546

The Asian population of London is noticeably concentrated in East and West London. Harrow has the highest Indian population, Redbridge has the highest Pakistani population, Tower Hamlets has the highest Bangladeshi population and Barnet has the highest Chinese population. Newham has the highest total Asian population in London. The twenty London boroughs with the highest total Asian population (Indian, Pakistani, Bangladeshi, Chinese, Filipino and Other Asian) are listed below.

Rank	London Borough	Population					
Rank	London Borough	Indian	Pakistani	Bangladeshi	Chinese	Other Asian	Total Asian
1	Newham	42,484	30,307	37,262	3,930	19,912	133,895
2	Redbridge	45,660	31,051	16,011	3,000	20,781	116,503
3	Brent	58,017	14,381	1,749	3,250	28,589	105,986
4	Tower Hamlets	6,787	2,442	81,377	8,109	5,786	104,501
5	Harrow	63,051	7,797	1,378	2,629	26,953	101,808
6	Ealing	48,240	14,711	1,786	4,132	31,570	100,439
7	Hounslow	48,161	13,676	2,189	2,405	20,826	87,257
8	Hillingdon	36,795	9,200	2,639	2,889	17,730	69,253
9	Barnet	27,920	5,344	2,215	8,259	22,180	65,918
10	Croydon	24,660	10,865	2,570	3,925	17,607	59,627
11	Waltham Forest	9,134	26,347	4,632	2,579	11,697	54,389
12	Merton	8,106	7,337	2,216	2,618	15,866	36,143
13	Camden	6,083	1,489	12,503	6,493	8,878	35,446
14	Enfield	11,648	2,594	5,599	2,588	12,464	34,893
15	Southwark	8,642	9,718	1,493	3,715	9,770	33,338
16	Wandsworth	7,213	2,328	6,299	5,917	10,105	31,862
17	Greenwich	7,836	2,594	1,645	5,061	12,758	29,894
18	Barking and Dagenham	7,436	8,007	7,701	1,315	5,135	29,594
19	Westminster	5,819	1,623	3,912	8,074	7,764	27,192
20	Kingston Upon Thames	6,325	3,009	892	2,883	13,043	26,152

=== Foreign-born population ===
At the 2011 census, 36.7% of London's population was foreign born (including 24.5% born outside of Europe), with 3,082,000 residents born abroad in 2014. London has the largest population number (not percentage) of foreign-born residents of any UK city.

	Born in the UK		Foreign-born	
	Number	%	Number	%
Inner London	2,012,000	57.8	1,325,000	42.2
Outer London	3,348,000	66.9	1,757,000	33.1
London (total)	5,359,000	63.3	3,082,000	36.7

== Significant ethnic minority communities ==
=== Afghans ===
There is an Afghan refugee community in London.

=== Arabs ===
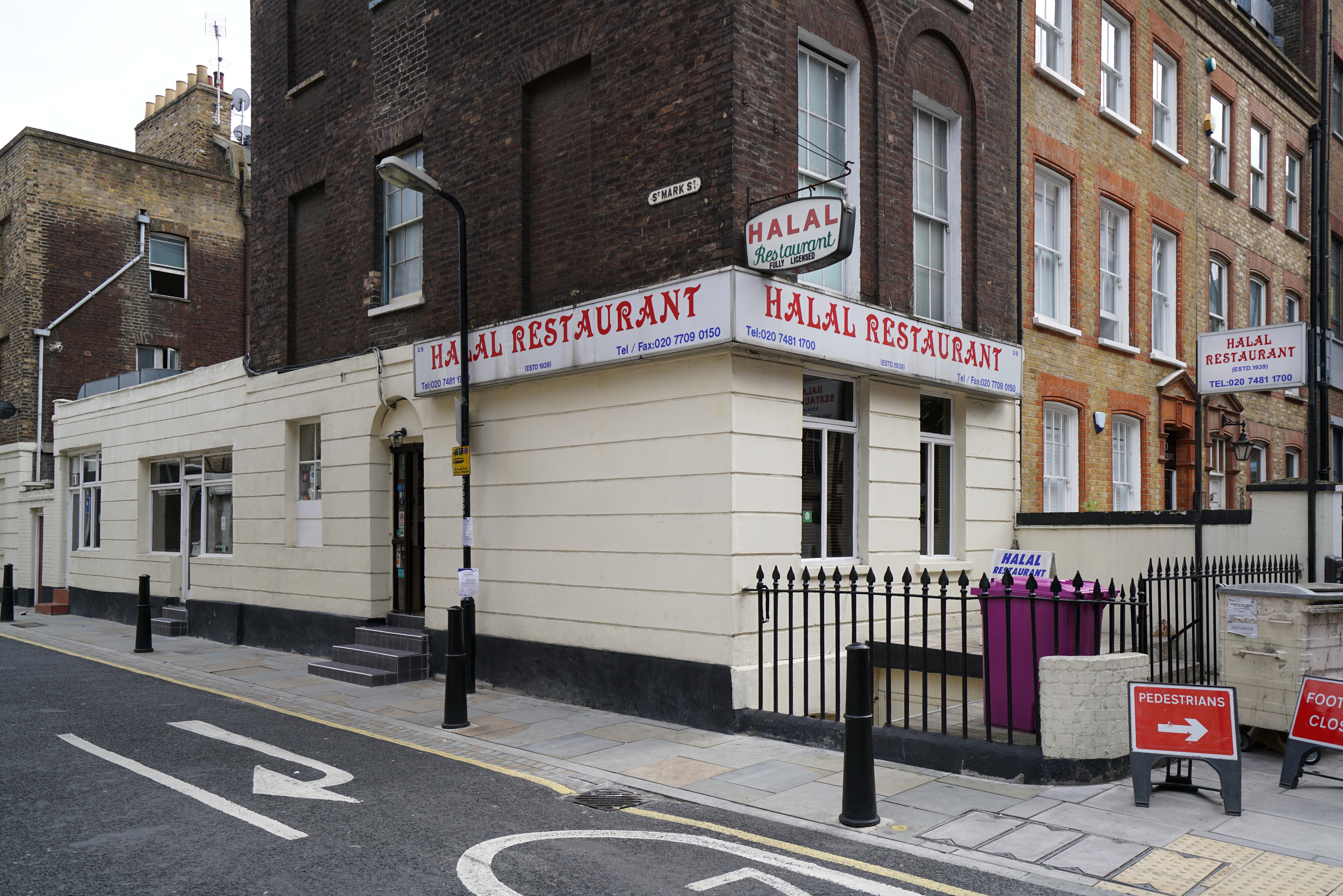
Halal Restaurant in the district of Whitechapel

Significant migration from Arab countries to the UK began in the 1940s, mostly by Egyptians. Other waves followed, such as Lebanese fleeing the civil war. The centre of London has a thriving Arab community, centred around Edgware Road.

=== Bangladeshis ===
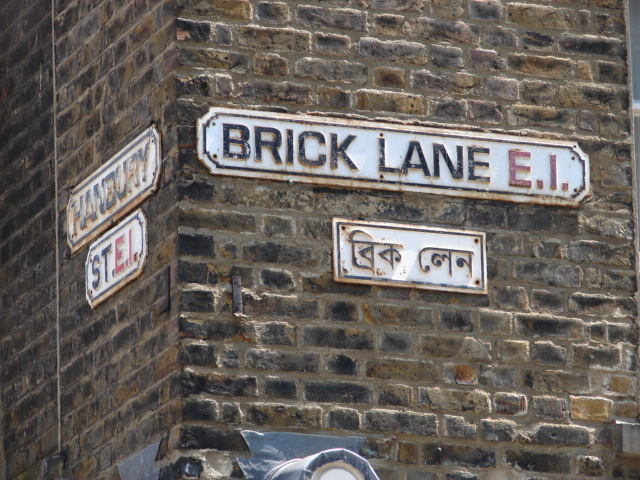
A Bengali sign in Brick Lane in Whitechapel, which is home to a large Bengali diaspora.

A major wave of immigration began in the 1970s, as people from the Sylhet Division arrived in London, fleeing poverty and the Bangladesh Liberation War. Many settled around Spitalfields and Whitechapel, where they entered the textile trade. This trade has declined causing unemployment, but the community has moved into other businesses, including restaurants and banking. The level of immigration peaked in 1986 and has since entered a decline with the introduction of stricter immigration laws.

The community remains concentrated around Whitechapel and has spread into other east London boroughs. London as a city is home to the single largest number of people of Bangladeshi origin outside of Bangladesh, with close to 200,000 individuals being of full Bangladeshi origin in 2007.

The community also annually hosts Europe's largest outdoor Asian event known as the Boishakhi Mela in Bethnal Green as part of the Bengali New Year celebrations.

=== Chinese ===
Chinese people constitute the fourth largest Asian group in London (behind the Indians, Pakistanis and Bangladeshis respectively); numbering 114,800 in 2007, they are spread more or less across the entire city and have become successful in British life, especially when it comes to cuisine. The history of the Chinese in London is long and complex, with the first Chinese people arriving in the city in the 19th century as sailors.

=== Germans ===
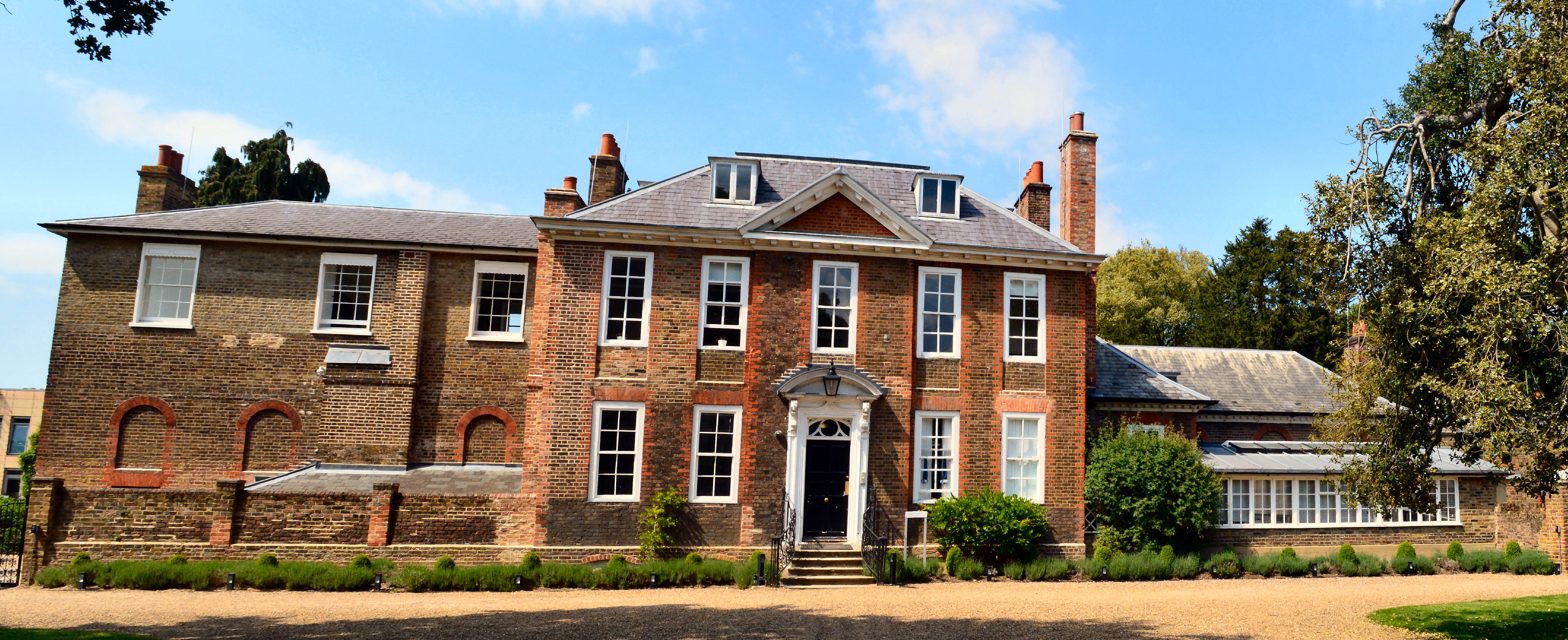
Douglas House in Petersham, which houses the German School London

Fiona Moore, author of "The German School in London, UK: Fostering the Next Generation of National Cosmopolitans?", wrote circa 2012 that the London German community "relies on subtle network connections rather than the displaying of obvious membership traits", since London Germans attended the same churches, joined the same clubs, and sent their children to the same schools. According to Moore this aspect was likely influenced by the outcomes of World War I and World War II, resulting in encouragement for UK-based Germans "to try to blend in to a greater degree than elsewhere."

As of 2012 the German business and expatriate community is centred on the London Borough of Richmond upon Thames, which houses the German School London (DSL) and most German expatriates residing in London. Moore wrote that the borough "does not immediately show signs of hosting a German community" due to a lack of obvious German businesses and storefronts, but that most residents know of the location of the DSL and that there are "more subtle signs of German presence."

As of 2012, German expatriates are located throughout London. As of that year, some of them do not go to the Borough of Richmond upon Thames even though the centre of the German community is located there.

=== Greeks ===
According to the "History of London's Greek community" by Jonathan Harris, the Greek population of London numbered several thousand by 1870 AD whereas in 1850 AD it was just a few hundred. The 2001 Census recorded 12,360 Greek-born people living in London, with particular concentrations in the Hyde Park, Regent's Park, Chelsea and Kensington Census tracts.

The Census tracts with the highest number of Cypriot-born people in 2001 were Palmers Green, Upper Edmonton, Cockfosters, Lower Edmonton, Tottenham North and Tottenham South. Many Greek-Cypriots reside in Wood Green, Harringay and Palmers Green, the latter harbouring the largest community of Greek-Cypriots outside Cyprus, resulting in these areas bearing local nicknames whereby the Green is replaced by Greek – as in Greek Lanes and Palmers Greek.

According to a City of London Corporation sponsored report, there are between 280,600 and 310,000 Greek speakers in Greater London.

The Greek Primary School of London and the Greek Secondary School of London both serve the community.

=== Indians ===
British Indians have long been one of London's largest ethnic minority groups and in 2007 over 500,000 Indians were residing in London (this excludes people of half or less Indian origin). Around 7% of London's population is of Indian origin. Indians have been in the British capital for generations and come from all walks of life. They are influential in the city's culture and are major contributors to London's workforce and economy.

Harrow, Southall, Hounslow and Wembley have significant Indian populations.

=== Irish ===
Irish migration to Great Britain has a lengthy history due to the close proximity of, and complex relationship between, the islands of Ireland and Great Britain and the various political entities that have ruled them. Today, millions of residents of Great Britain are either from the island of Ireland or have Irish ancestry. Around six million Britons have an Irish grandfather or grandmother (approximately 10% of the UK population). 900,000 ethnic Irish people live in the capital (12% of the city's population); despite this, some sources put the population of people of Irish descent in London at 77% (some five and a half million people), although the White British and White Irish populations combined are less than this. The highest concentrations of White Irish people in 2011 were in the London boroughs of Brent and Islington, where they made up 4.0 and 3.9% of the population respectively.

=== Jamaicans ===
There are records that show black people, predominantly from Jamaica, living in London during the 17th and 18th centuries; but it was not until the arrival of the HMT Empire Windrush, on 22 June 1948, that significant numbers of Caribbeans, in particular Jamaicans, arrived in the capital. This has since become an important landmark in the history of modern multicultural Britain. During the post World War II era, the presence of the Caribbean Community was requested to help reconstruct the British economy. Employers such as British Rail, the NHS and London transport recruited almost exclusively from Jamaica. Some 250,000 Londoners are of Jamaican origin. Brixton, Hackney and Harlesden are considered the community's cultural capitals.

=== Japanese ===
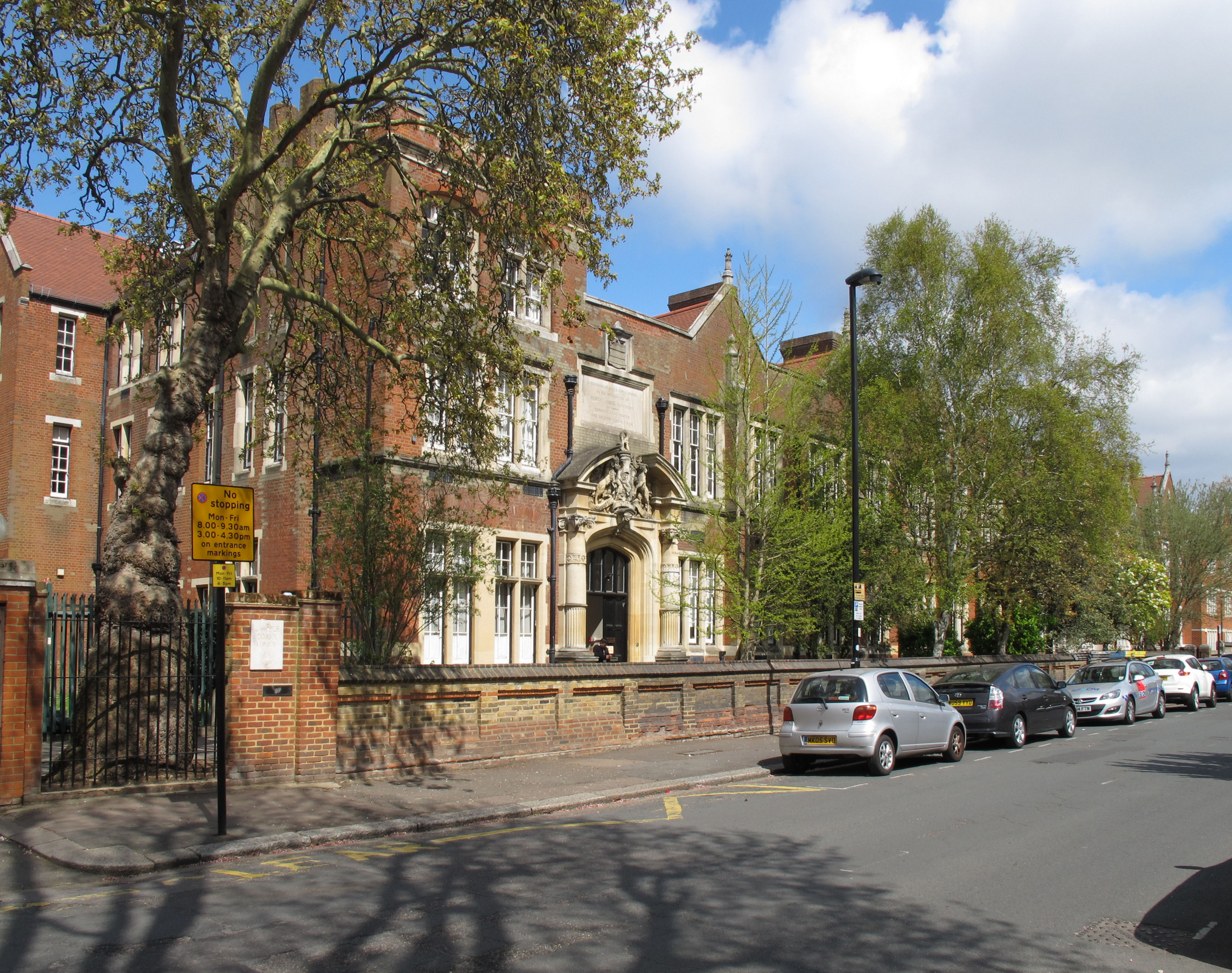
Japanese School in London

Junko Sakai, author of Japanese Bankers in the City of London: Language, Culture and Identity in the Japanese Diaspora, stated that there is no particular location for the Japanese community in London, but that the families of Japanese "company men" have a tendency of living in North London and West London. Japanese restaurants and shops are located around these groups of Japanese people.

=== Jews ===
Jews are an ethnic and religious minority, and are protected under the Race Relations Act. London has the second largest Jewish community in Europe after Paris, numbering some 160,000, particularly in North London. Districts with a high concentration include Finchley, Mill Hill, Edgware, Stanmore, Golders Green, Hendon, Hampstead Garden Suburb, Highgate, and further east the Hasidic-strong exclave in Stamford Hill & South Tottenham.

=== Koreans ===
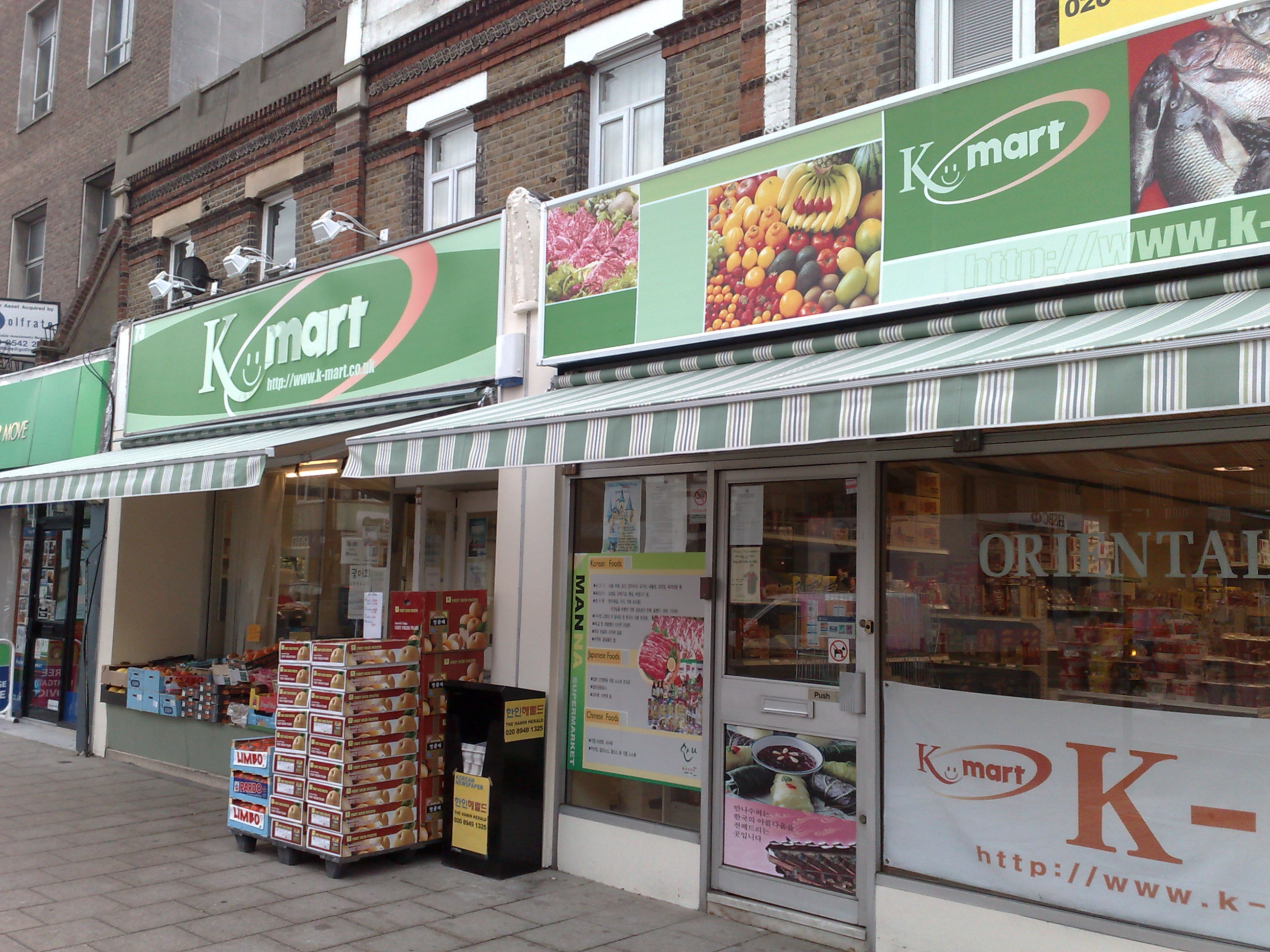
Kmart, a Korean supermarket in New Malden

As of 2014 there were about 10,000 ethnic Koreans in New Malden proper, and as of the same year the Korean population in the area around New Malden is around 20,000, including about 600 originating from North Korea, giving it the largest group of North Koreans in Europe. Many of the Koreans living in New Malden work for Korean companies, and they are either permanently settled and formerly expatriate, or they are still expatriates. In 2015 Paul Fischer of The Independent wrote that the North Koreans were insular, and that there were tensions between the South Korean majority and the North Koreans in New Malden.

The New Malden area has Korean-language churches and nursery schools as well as restaurants and shops with Korean clientele. The area has Korean supermarkets, about 20 Korean restaurants and cafes, including those serving bulgogi. It also has a noraebang (Karaoke bar). The Korean language is visible on several shop signs. The original Embassy of South Korea to the United Kingdom is in Malden.

Some factors cited in The Telegraph as reasons why the Korean community formed in New Malden included a 1950s joint venture partnership between a chaebol and Racal Avionics (formerly Decca), Lord Chancellor's Walk in Coombe Lane West previously serving as the residence of the Ambassador of South Korea to the United Kingdom, and Samsung Electronics having its UK offices in New Malden until they moved to their current location in Chertsey, Surrey in 2005. Many Koreans settled in New Malden in the 1970s due to the ambassador's location.

There is a newspaper published in New Malden, Free NK, which is opposed to the government of North Korea.

=== Lithuanians ===
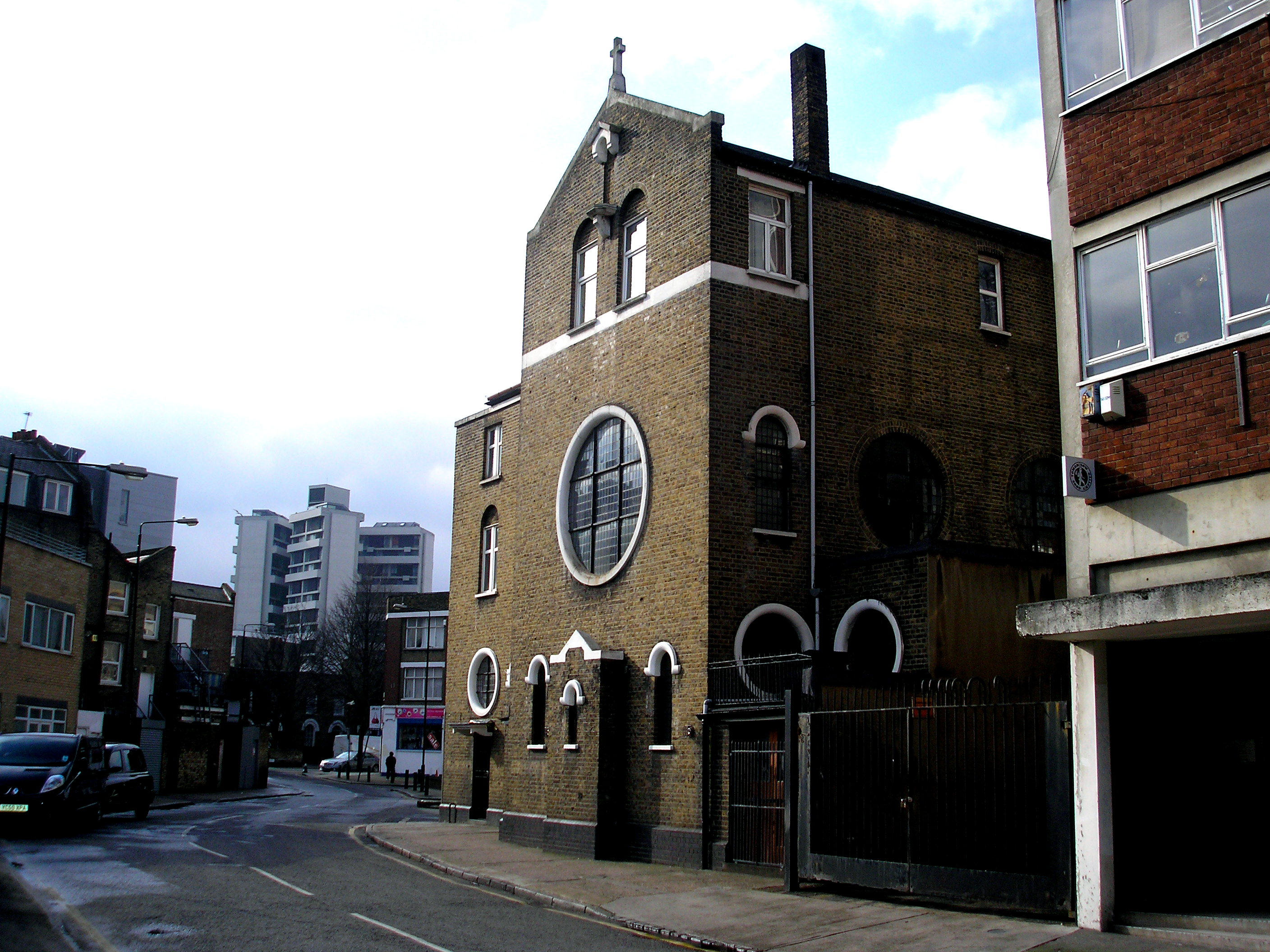
St Casimir's Lithuanian Church in Cambridge Heath

The Lithuanian community in London goes back to at least the early 20th century. Most of the community came in a wave of Eastern European immigration in the 2000s, after Lithuania joined the European Union.

Most of London's Lithuanians live in the boroughs of Barking and Dagenham, Newham, Redbridge and Waltham Forest, with smaller numbers elsewhere. The main Lithuanian-speaking Roman Catholic church, St Casimir's, however, lies in Cambridge Heath.

=== Nigerians ===
London (in particular the southern boroughs) is home to the largest Nigerian community in the UK, and possibly the largest overseas Nigerian community in the world. The first recorded Nigerian in London was Olaudah Equiano who came to Britain after escaping from slavery over 200 years ago, becoming a member of the abolitionist Sons of Africa group.

In the mid-20th century a wave of Nigerian immigrants came to London. Civil and political unrest in the country contributed to numerous refugees arriving in England. The vast majority of famous and notable British people of Nigerian origin were either born in or now live in London.

Peckham (also known as Little Lagos and Yorubatown) is home to one of the largest overseas Nigerian communities in the world; many of the local establishments are Yoruba-owned. Nigerian churches and mosques can be found in the area. As immigrants become assimilated, English is becoming the predominant language of the local Nigerian British population. The Yoruba language is declining in use in the Peckham area despite the increasing Nigerian population. In 2001, about 7% of Peckham's population was born in Nigeria. A much larger proportion of the ward's 60% Black population is of Nigerian descent, as 40% are of other African descent.

=== Pakistanis ===
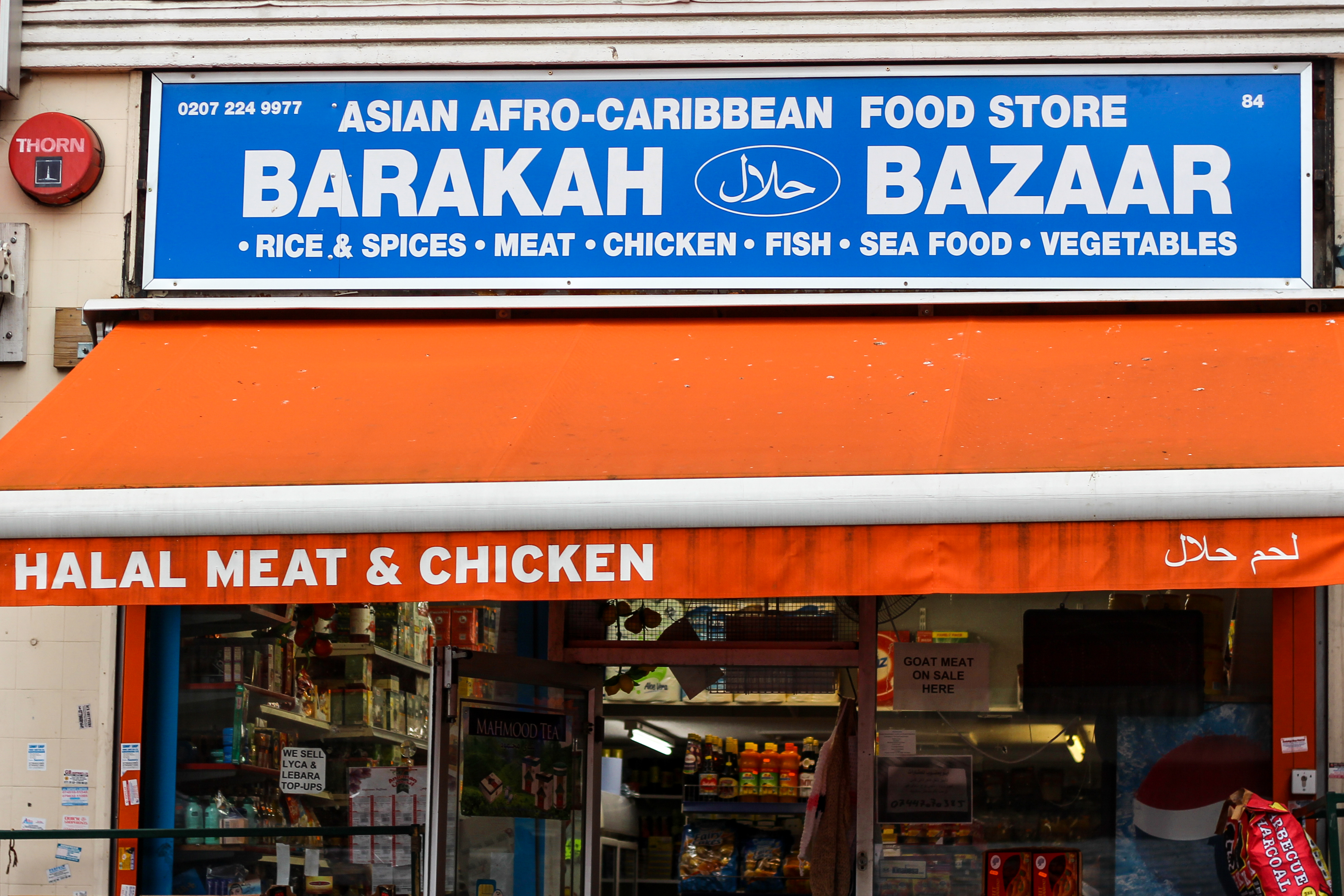
Asian Afro-Caribbean Food Store in London

Pakistanis in London form the largest concentrated community of British Pakistanis; immigration from regions which now form Pakistan predate Pakistan's independence. The main concentrations of Pakistani settlement in London are found in Outer London with the boroughs of Redbridge, Newham and Waltham Forest accounting for nearly a third of Londoners of Pakistani descent.

=== Polish ===
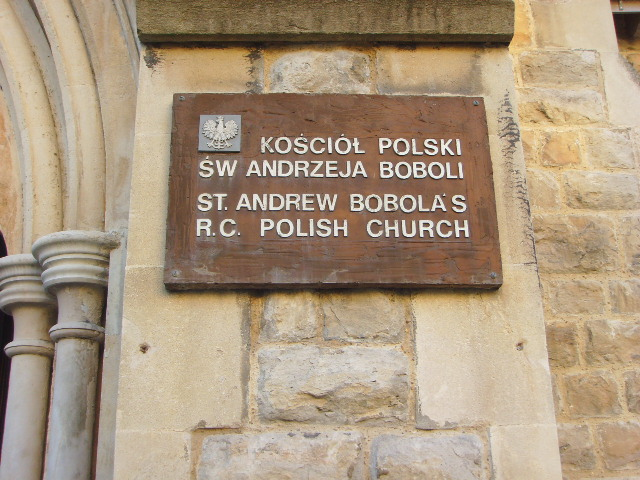
Sign in English and Polish outside St Andrew Bobola's Church in Shepherd's Bush

London has had a notable Polish community since the Second World War. Many of the migrants from Poland in the 1940s were soldiers and their families. The Polish Government in Exile was based in London until it was dissolved in 1991 following the restoration of democracy in Poland. In the 2000s a wave of Polish immigrants came to Britain, including London, after Poland joined the European Union. As of 2016, Poles now account for about 4.5 per cent of London's foreign-born population.

The boroughs of Ealing, Enfield, Kensington and Chelsea, Haringey, Lambeth, Lewisham and Wandsworth have significant numbers of Poles residing in them. The Church of the Evangelist in Putney is one of several Polish-speaking Roman Catholic churches in London, and the Polish Social and Cultural Association in Hammersmith is the community's main centre. Polish shops, with their distinctive red and white signs accompanied by words in the Polish language, can be found in many parts of London.

=== Romanians ===
There has been a growing Romanian community in London since World War II. In the 2000s a wave of Romanian immigrants came to the UK, including London, after Romania joined the European Union.

A particularly concentrated community exists in the Edgware-London suburb of Burnt Oak which has gained the nickname "Little Romania" or "Little Bucharest". Most Romanians belong to the Romanian Orthodox religion.

=== Romanis ===
Romani people are concentrated in north and east London. Approximately 30,000 Roma and Travellers live in London.

=== Sri Lankans ===
There is a large Sri Lankan community in London. The population of Sri Lankans in London was 50,000 in 2001 and 84,000 in 2011. British Sri Lankans in London (mainly Tamils) can be found in Harrow (West London) and Tooting (South London). They have a long presence in the UK dating back to the colonial times in the 19th century. However, the majority came as refugees during the Sri Lankan Civil War.

=== South Africans ===
More than 53,000 South Africans live in London.

=== Turkish ===
London is home to the largest Turkish community in the UK. The boroughs of Enfield, Haringey and Hackney have a significant number of Turkish inhabitants. A large Turkish-Cypriot community is also present in boroughs of South London such as Lambeth and Croydon.

== Gallery ==
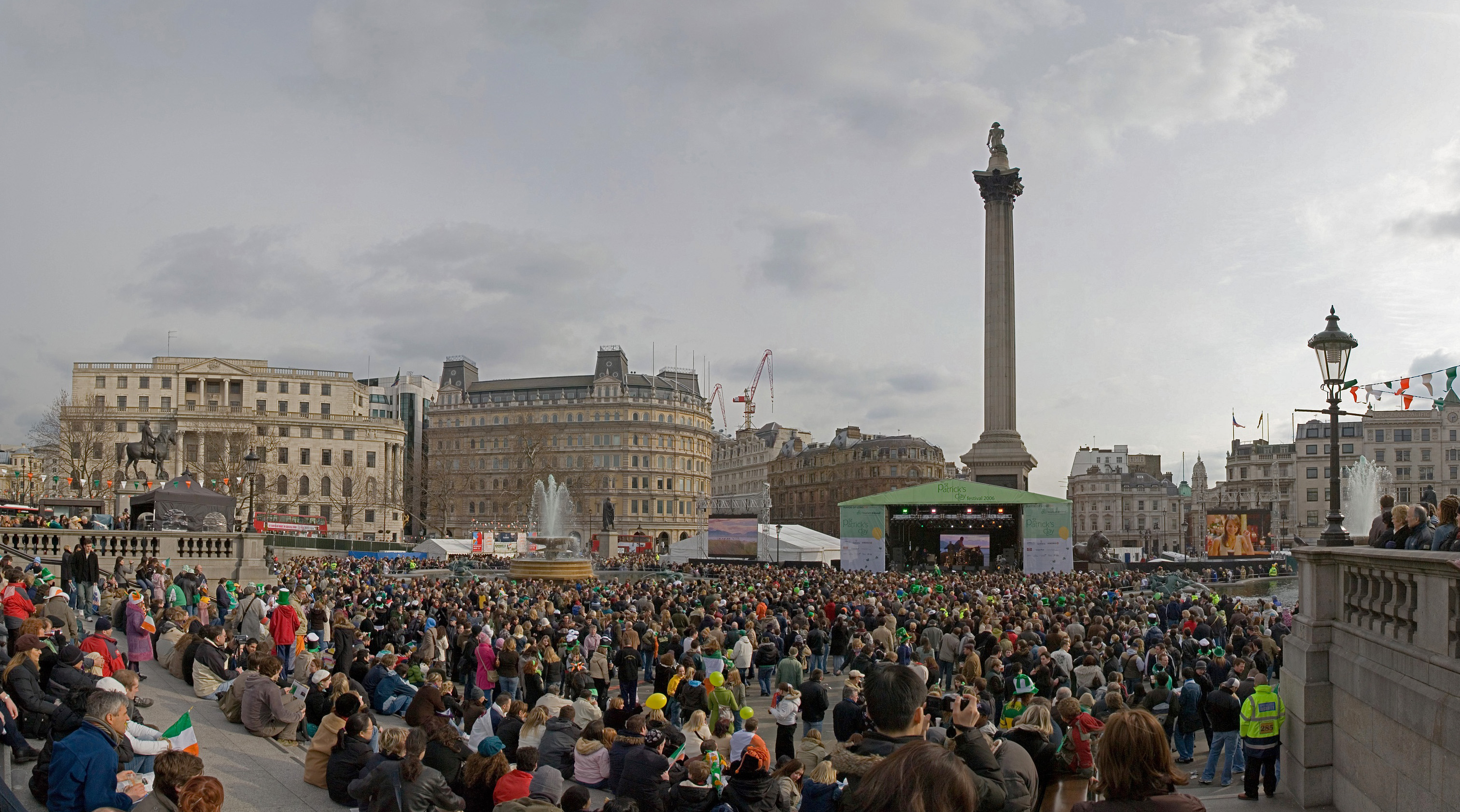
London's Irish community celebrating Saint Patrick's Day.

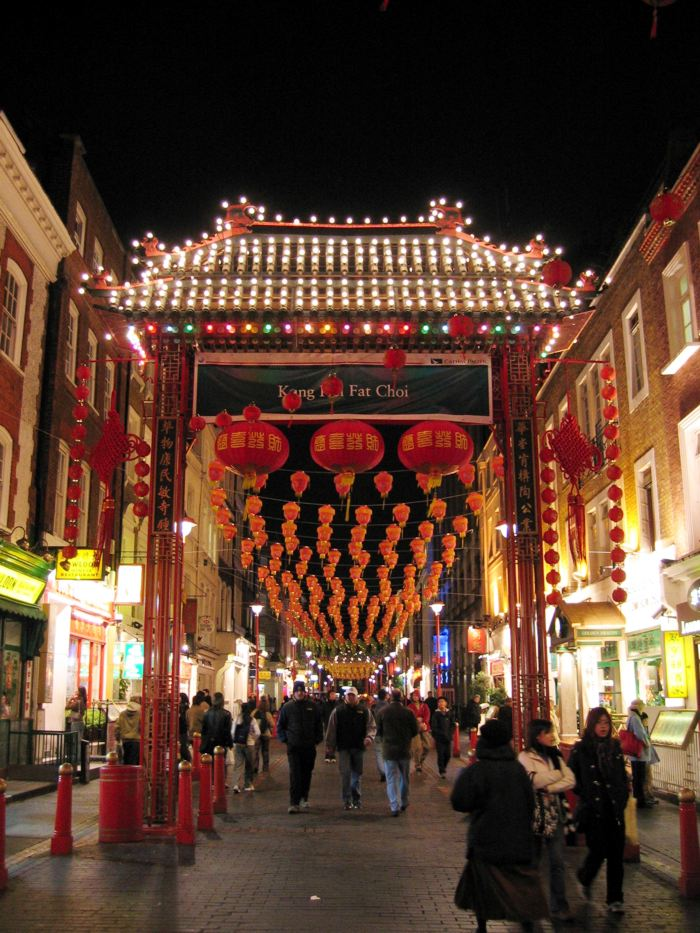
Chinatown, London during Chinese new year.

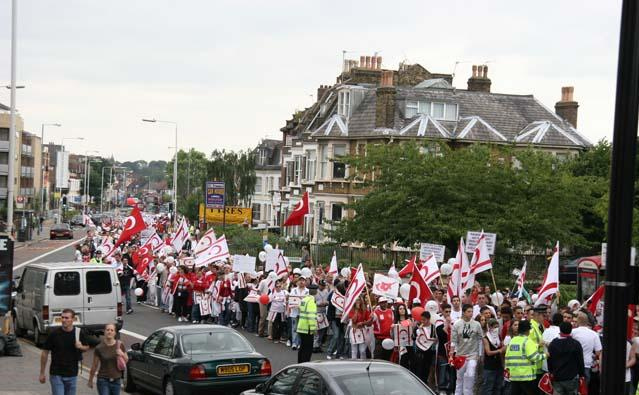
London Turks protesting.

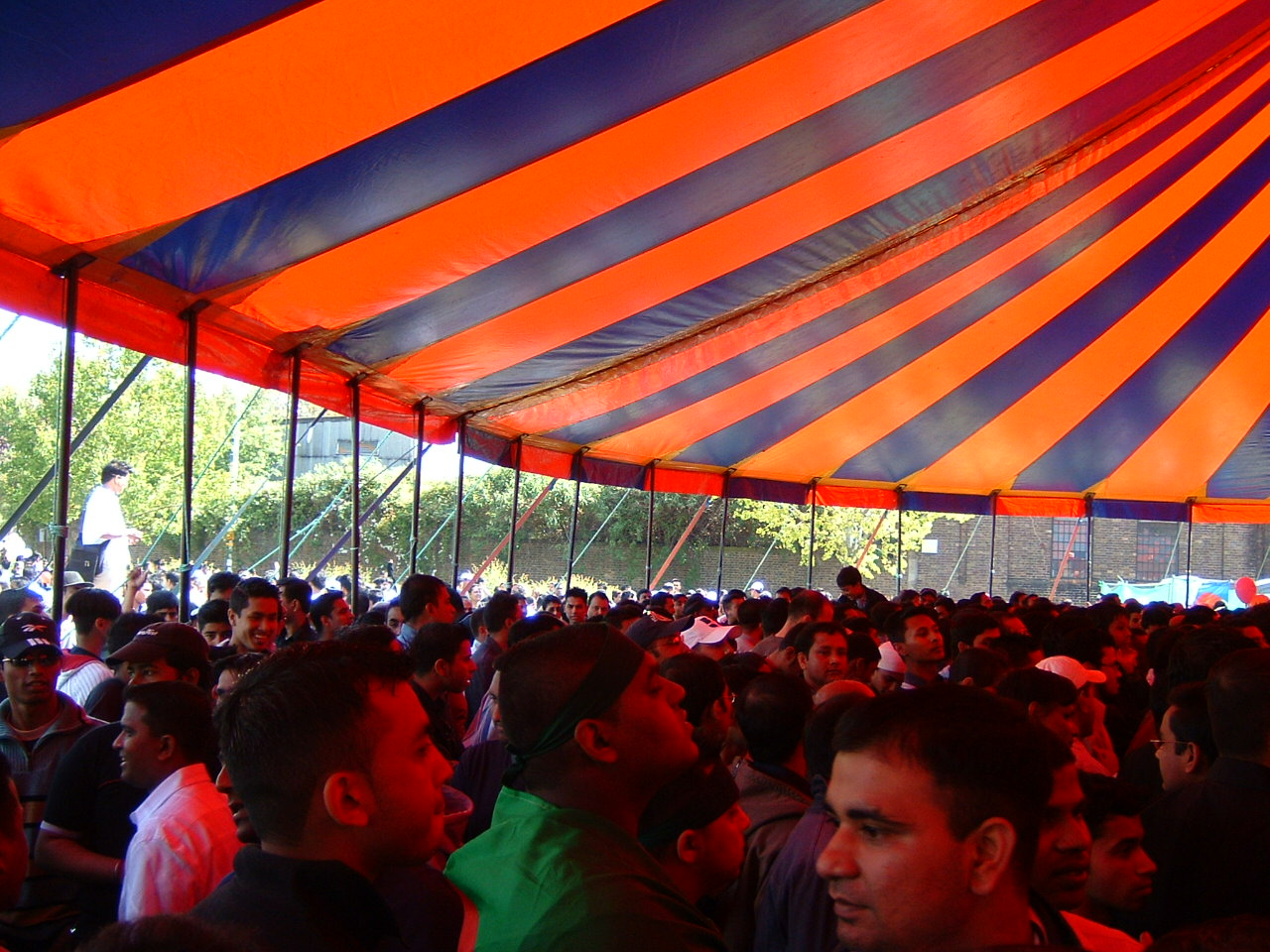
London Bangladeshis at Baishakhi Mela.

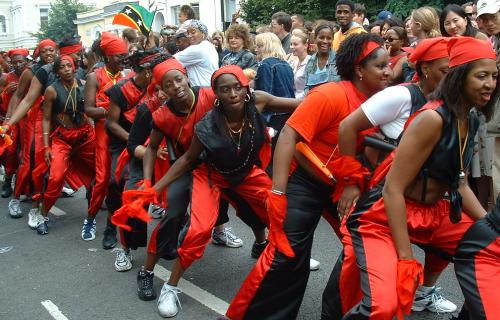
Kittitian and Nevisian street dancers at the Notting Hill Carnival.

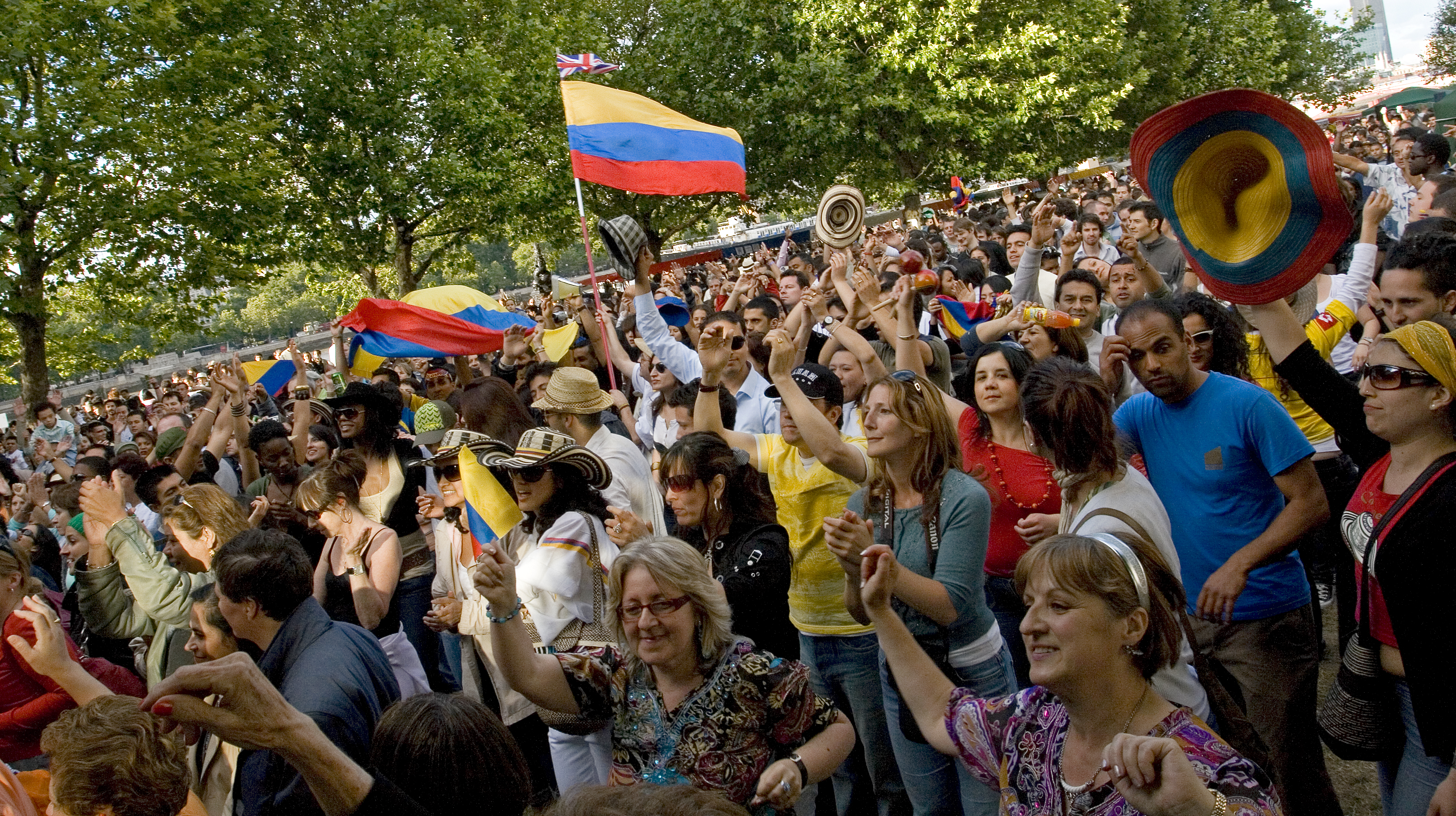
Large numbers of Colombians live in London.

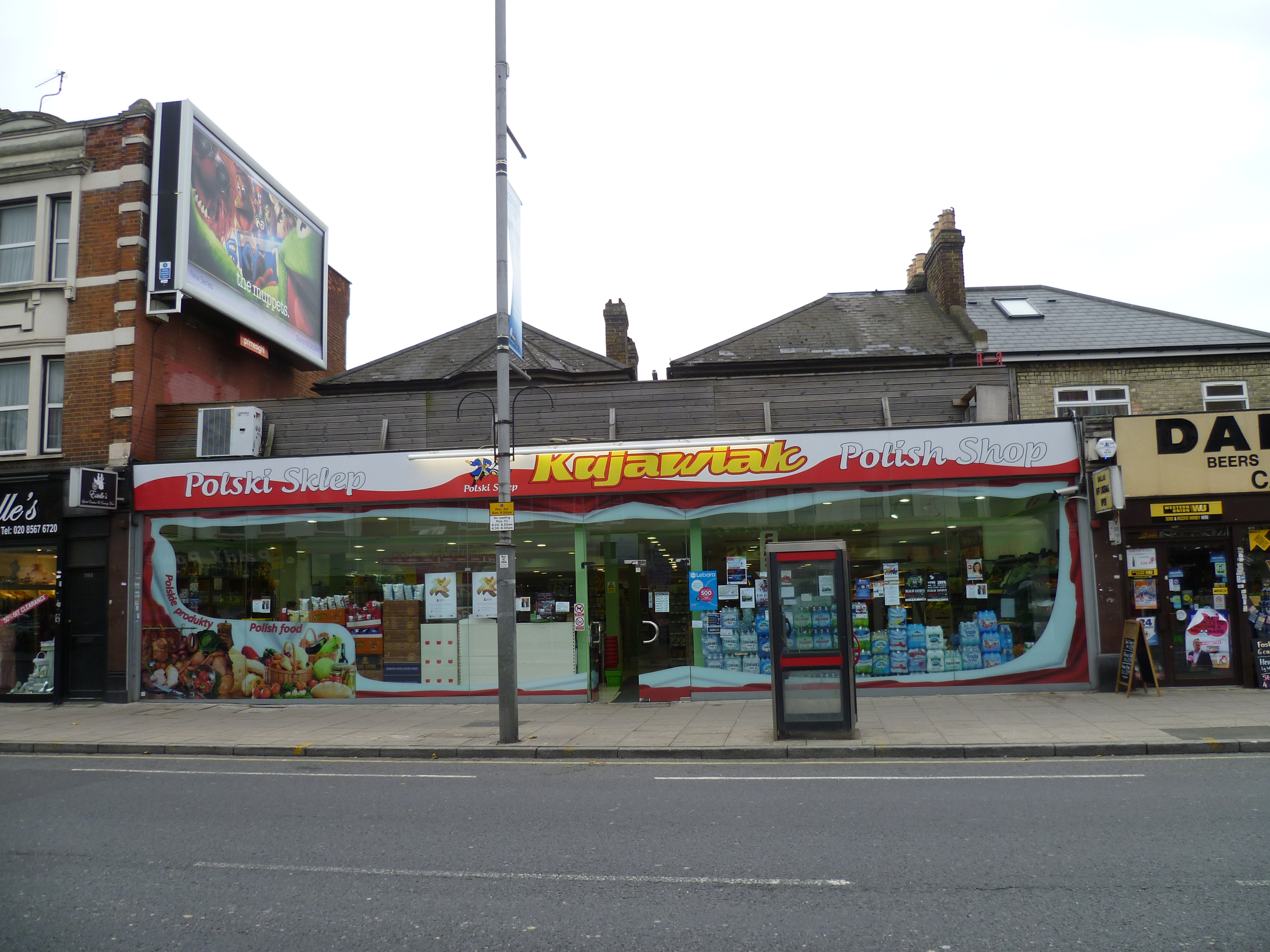
A Polish shop in Ealing.

== See also ==
- Demographics of London
