= The Swedish School in London =

Svenska Skolan London (Swedish School in London)
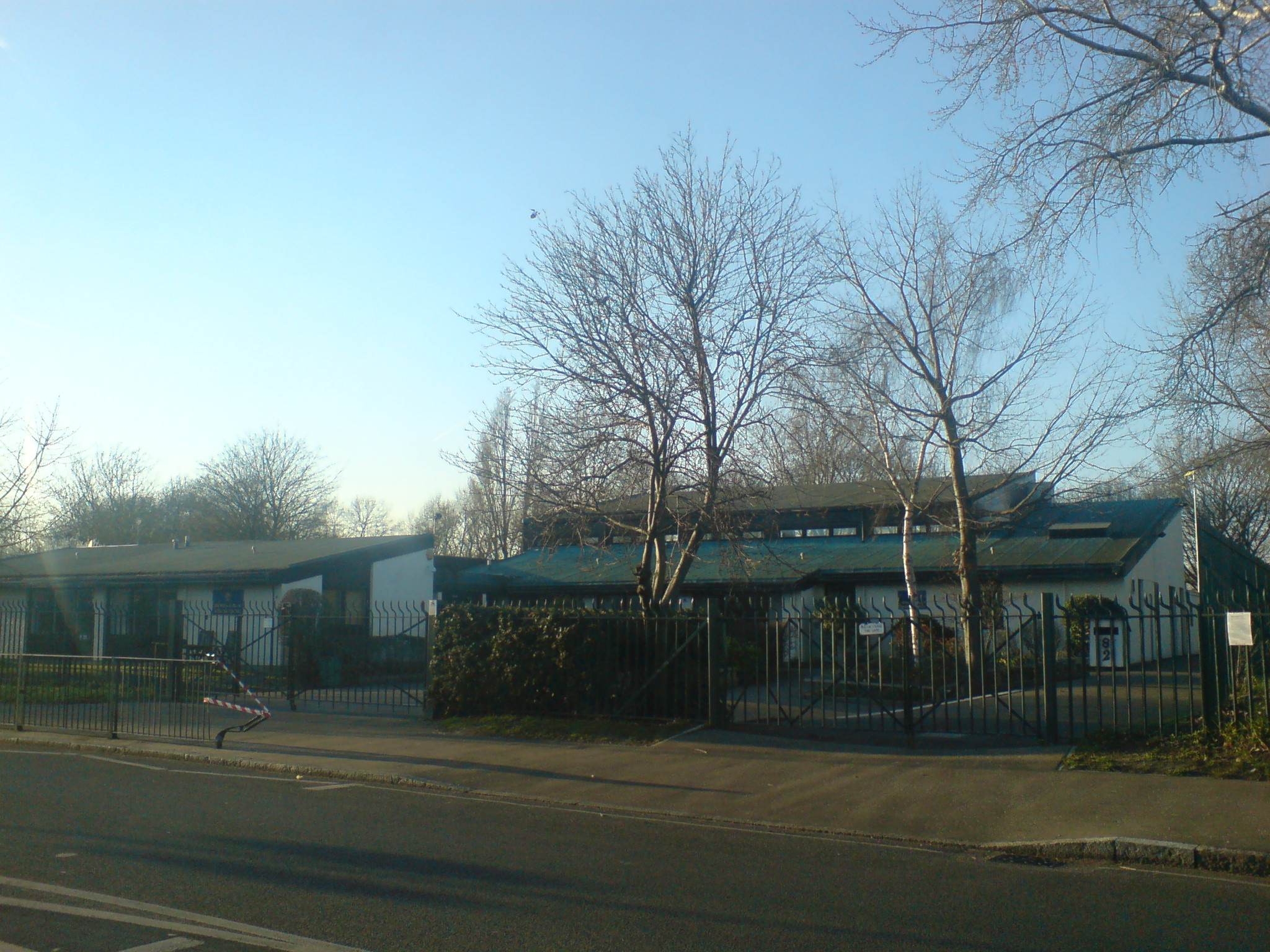

Location
- 82 Lonsdale Road; Barnes, London, SW13 9JS; England; 51.4852°N 0.2447°W

Information
- Type: Independent school
- Established: 1907
- Local authority: Richmond upon Thames
- Department for Education URN: 102948 Tables
- Ofsted: Reports
- Chair: Klaus Bassler
- Head Teacher: Jenny Abrahamsson
- Gender: Mixed
- Age: 3 to 19
- Enrolment: 241 (June 2023)
- Colours: Blue and yellow
- Website: https://swedishschool.org.uk/

The Swedish School in London (Swedish: Svenska Skolan i London) is an independent school located in the London Borough of Richmond upon Thames. Since its founding in 1907, the school has supported Swedish expatriate families wishing to maintain their language and cultural heritage while living in London. Approximately half of the pupils are permanently resident in the UK, while the remainder are expats.

The school consists of a nursery, primary school and secondary school (Swedish: förskolan och grundskolan) for pupils aged 2-16 years, located near St Paul's School in Barnes, London, and a sixth form (gymnasiet) for 16- to 19-year-olds, in Kew, London, co-located with The National Archives. The sixth form of the school has three programmes: a science programme, a social science programme focusing on civics and the humanities and a business administration programme focusing on economics and entrepreneurship.

The Swedish School in London is regulated by the British schools inspectorate, Ofsted, as well as by the Swedish national agency for education, Skolverket.

The school welcomes Swedish exchange students in the Sixth Form, who stay with local host families arranged by the school.

The school has been recognised as Outstanding for the last 14 years, including as a boarding school.

== History ==
The school was founded in 1907 in and was originally hosted in Ulrika Eleonora Church (The Swedish Church in London) at Harcourt Street in Marylebone. The school's former PE hall and canteen is today Svenska Salen. The church was designed in 1911 by architects Herbert Wigglesworth and Axel H. Haig (known for Harrow School, Trinity College) in Victorian Gothic Revival style.

The lower school moved to Barnes in 1976 to a building designed by Swedish architect Klas Nilsson. The school's Sixth Form was previously based at the American International University in Richmond but moved to The National Archives in Kew in 2019.

== See also ==
- Stockholm International School – Anglo-American school in Stockholm
