= The Norwegian School in London =

Independent Norwegian school

Location
- 28 Arterberry Road; Wimbledon, London, SW20 8AH; England

Information
- Type: Independent school
- Established: 1982; 44 years ago
- Local authority: Merton London Borough Council
- Department for Education URN: 102693 Tables
- Ofsted: Reports
- Chair: Siri Mikalsen
- Head teacher: Lise Meling Karlsen
- Gender: Mixed
- Age: 6 to 16
- Enrolment: 65 (2017/2018)
- Website: http://www.norwegianschool.org.uk/

The Norwegian School in London is an independent Norwegian international school in Wimbledon, London, England for children aged six to sixteen years. It was founded in January 1982. The school has two main divisions: a Primary School for pupils aged six to twelve years, and a Lower Secondary School for pupils aged twelve to sixteen, all together incorporating grades 1 through 10. The school's Head Teacher is Lise Meling Karlsen.

Since the school is accredited by both English and Norwegian school authorities, it must conform to both countries' regulations. From the English side the whole school is supervised by Merton Council, which is the local district and Ofsted (Office for Standards in Education). Norwegian authorities supervise the primary section through the Norwegian Directorate for Education and Training.

The school is housed in a Victorian villa from the 1870s, in a quiet residential area in Wimbledon, South West London. Many families with children registered at the school, choose to settle in the area. The pupils are a mix of longtime-residential in London and those who are staying for a shorter period of time. A part of the school building is rented out to The Norwegian Kindergarten in London, with whom there is close cooperation. Many of the longtime-residential children will attend both the Norwegian Kindergarten and the Norwegian School.

For the 2018/2019 school year, roughly 65 children attend the school: about 46 Primary School students and 19 Lower Secondary School. There are a total of 14 employees corresponding to 11 FTEs.

The school is owned by an English foundation: The Norwegian School in London Ltd. The school's top management is its Board, consisting a total of six members. Two are elected by parents who have children in this school.
