= ICS London =

Location
- 7b Wyndham Place, W1H 1PN; London; England, United Kingdom; 51°31′04″N 0°10′13″W

Information
- Type: Independent school, international school
- Established: 1979
- Department for Education URN: 101171 Tables
- Head of School: Ms. Mona Taybi
- Gender: Co-educational
- Age: 3 to 18
- Enrollment: 157
- Colours: Red , Blue
- Affiliation: Globeducate Network
- Website: www.icslondon.co.uk

ICS London is a co-educational world International Baccalaureate school located in Marylebone, London, England, United Kingdom, teaching students aged from 3 to 18 years old.

== History ==
The Toettcher family established International Community School (ICS) in 1979. The school was set up to teach children English within a full curriculum International School. Since then the school has broadened its scope to offer a full curriculum for children between three and 18 years old.

The school has grown and developed over the years and is now one of just a small group of IB Word Schools offering the full International Baccalaureate (IB) programme. The school was formed upon a set of principles that the founders believed should underpin any school designed for the modern age. These included values such as freedom, internationalism, democracy, respect and the rule of law and they are still part of the ICS philosophy today.

In 2008, the International Baccalaureate made ICS London an IB World School, accredited to teach the Primary Years Programme (PYP), Middle Years Programme (MYP), and Diploma Programme (DP). Consisting of three age-targeted stages, this international curriculum takes a holistic approach to education, fostering intellectual, personal, emotional, and social skills.

In 2010, ICS London was awarded accreditation to teach the IB Diploma, becoming one of only five schools in the United Kingdom to teach all three school-age levels of the IB.

ICS London was acquired by NACE Schools group in 2017 and is now known as Globeducate.

== Curriculum ==
ICS teaches the International Baccalaureate curriculum through the three programmes:

- PYP for students aged 3–11 years old
- MYP for students aged 11–16 years old (with the addition of iGCSEs for students aged 14–16 old)
- DP for students aged 16–18 years old
