= Douglas House, Petersham =

Douglas House
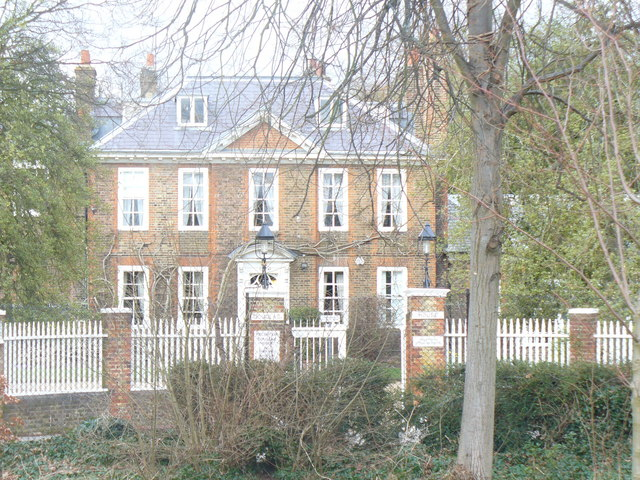
- Douglas House viewed from Petersham Avenue

- Location within London Borough of Richmond upon Thames
- Former names: Hall Place; Petersham Place

General information
- Status: Completed
- Type: House
- Architectural style: Queen Anne
- Location: Petersham, London Borough of Richmond upon Thames, England
- Coordinates: 51°26′42.6″N 0°18′18.9″W
- Current tenants: Deutsche Schule
- Completed: c. 1717
- Client: Nathaniel Halhead
- Owner: Federal Republic of Germany

Height
- Roof: slate

Technical details
- Floor count: 2

Listed Building – Grade II*
- Official name: Douglas House
- Designated: 25 June 1983
- Reference no.: 1285296

Douglas House is a Grade II* listed early 18th-century Queen Anne-style house in Petersham in the London Borough of Richmond upon Thames. It is now the site of the German School London (German: Deutsche Schule London; DSL).

== Location ==
Douglas House is located on the north side of Petersham Avenue leading west from the A307, Petersham Road to Ham House. The grounds of the house front the River Thames to the north. Ham Polo Club is situated to the west.

== History ==
The house was originally known as Hall Place or Petersham Place until acquiring its present name in the 1890s. Some sources state that the house was built in about 1680 but the manorial rolls that record of sale of the plot of land on which it stands during the late 17th century do not mention a building until 2 May 1717 when they record the sale of land and "brick messuage etc. built by Nathaniel Halhead" to Lord Carlton.

After his death in 1725, Carlton's nephew, Charles Douglas, 3rd Duke of Queensberry inherited the house and, with his wife, Catherine "Kitty" Hyde, the couple played host to literary and artistic figures of the time including John Gay who is reputed to have written and rehearsed the Beggar's Opera in 1728 whilst at the riverside summerhouse in the grounds. Their children having predeceased them, the house passed to their niece, Lady Jane Scott, following the death of the Duchess in 1777 and Duke in 1778.

The house subsequently passed to Lady Jane's niece, Lady Frances Scott, daughter of Francis Scott, Earl of Dalkeith; she became the second wife of Archibald Douglas, 1st Baron Douglas. The house then passed in 1817 to their daughter, Lady Caroline Lucy and her husband Vice Admiral Sir George Scott. Although the couple lived at the house, Caroline made her brother, Rev. James Douglas, 4th Baron Douglas, part owner in 1827. Following both their deaths in April 1857, it was their younger sister, Mary Sidney Douglas, who inherited. The house then passed through her to the Drummond-Moray family.

From the late 19th century the house was home to George Tournay Biddulph (1844–1929). A son of Robert Biddulph MP, he was a banker with Cocks, Biddulph & Co. Biddulph was appointed one of the Dysart Trustees on the death of Algernon Gray Tollemache in 1891 and helped oversee the management of the Tollemache estates, both locally in Petersham and Ham and elsewhere.

The house, stables and cottage were Grade II listed in 1950 and the house's designation upgraded to Grade II* in 1983.

The Federal Republic of Germany bought Douglas House and grounds in 1969 and built a school around it. The German School London was then founded in 1971. New buildings were erected in the grounds, but the original house and stables have been preserved.

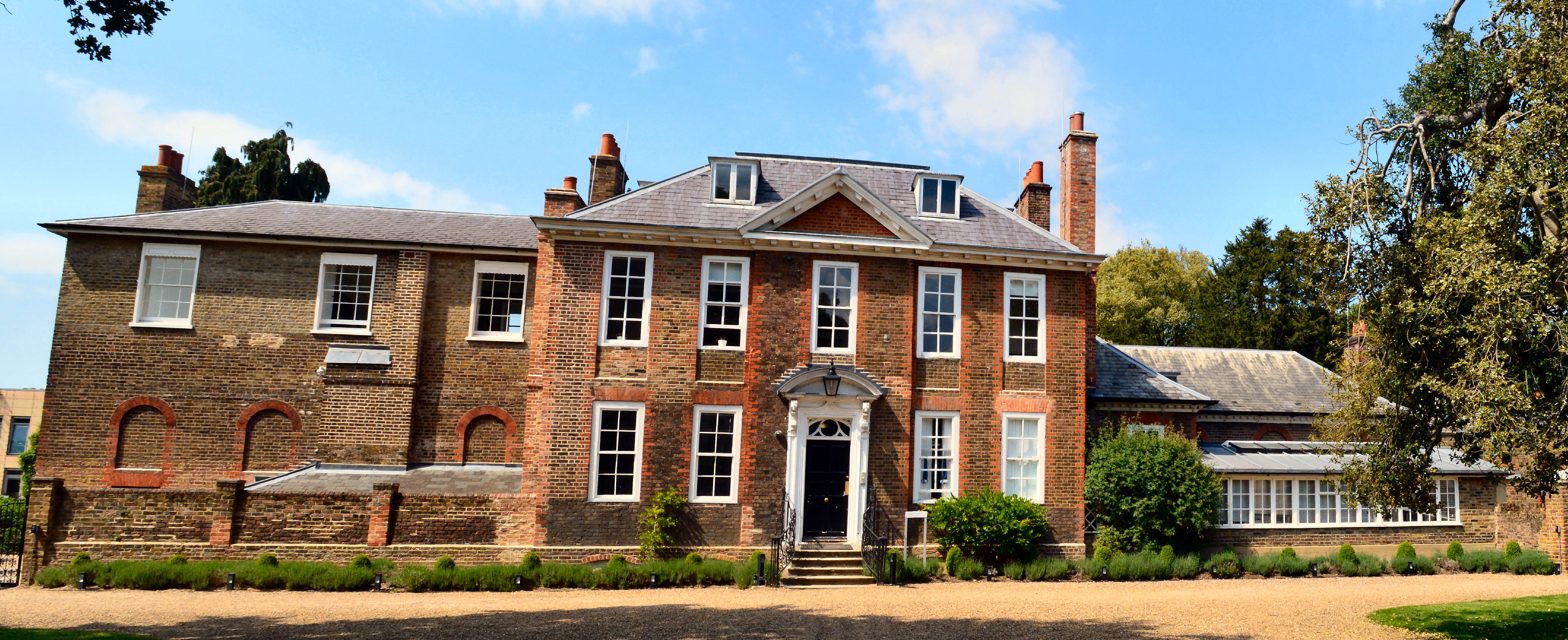
Douglas House
