= List of post-nominal letters (Canada) =

This is a list of post-nominal letters used in Canada. The order in which they follow an individual's name is:

1. Distinctions conferred directly by the Crown
2. University degrees
3. Memberships of societies and other distinctions

Normally no more than two are given, representing the highest award of each type. For decorations and medals, the order of precedence is the same as the order of precedence for the wearing of order insignias, decorations, and medals, as laid out by the Department of Canadian Heritage.

== Awards and orders ==
Post-nominal	Office	Notes
=== Higher national decorations ===
VC	Recipient of the Victoria Cross	Currently there are no living Canadians permitted to use the post-nominal letters VC. Since its creation in 1993, the Canadian Victoria Cross has never been awarded. Historical Canadians with the post-nominals VC were Canadian recipients of the British Victoria Cross.
CV	Recipient of the Cross of Valour	
=== National orders and Commonwealth orders ===
OM	Member of the Order of Merit	Commonwealth order
CC	Companion of the Order of Canada	The Order of Canada is awarded by the governor general for "the highest degree of merit, an outstanding level of talent and service, or an exceptional contribution to Canada and humanity".
OC	Officer of the Order of Canada	The Order of Canada is awarded by the governor general for "the highest degree of merit, an outstanding level of talent and service, or an exceptional contribution to Canada and humanity".
CM	Member of the Order of Canada	The Order of Canada is awarded by the governor general for "the highest degree of merit, an outstanding level of talent and service, or an exceptional contribution to Canada and humanity".
CMM	Commander of the Order of Military Merit	
COM	Commander of the Order of Merit of the Police Forces	
CVO	Commander of the Royal Victorian Order	Commonwealth order
OMM	Officer of the Order of Military Merit	
OOM	Officer of the Order of Merit of the Police Forces	
LVO	Lieutenant of the Royal Victorian Order	Commonwealth order
MMM	Member of the Order of Military Merit	
MOM	Member of the Order of Merit of the Police Forces	
MVO	Member of the Royal Victorian Order	Commonwealth order
=== Obsolete National orders ===
CM	Recipient of the Medal of Courage of the Order of Canada	The Medal of Courage of the Order of Canada was never awarded and was abolished in 1972 when the Order of Canada was restructured into two levels and the Canadian Bravery Decorations were established.
SM	Recipient of the Medal of Service of the Order of Canada	The Medal of Service of the Order of Canada was awarded to 319 Canadians, and would be converted into the Officer level of the Order of Canada in 1972. Thirty recipients of the Medal of Service died prior to 1972 and thus were never converted to Officers of the Order of Canada.
=== Provincial orders ===
Note: Precedence of provincial orders are in order of when they were added to the national orders system at the request of the provincial orders system, not by the normal order of precedence for provinces.
GOQ	Grand officier de l'Ordre national du Québec	English: Grand officer of the National Order of Quebec
OQ	Officier de l'Ordre national du Québec	English: Officer of the National Order of Quebec
CQ	Chevalier de l'Ordre national du Québec	English: Knight of the National Order of Quebec
SOM	Member of the Saskatchewan Order of Merit	
OOnt	Member of the Order of Ontario	
OBC	Member of the Order of British Columbia	
AOE	Member of the Alberta Order of Excellence	
OPEI	Member of the Order of Prince Edward Island	
OM	Member of the Order of Manitoba	
ONB	Member of the Order of New Brunswick	
ONS	Member of the Order of Nova Scotia	
ONL	Member of the Order of Newfoundland and Labrador	
=== Territorial orders ===
Note: Precedence of territories orders are in order of when they were added to the national orders system, not by the normal order of precedence for territories.
ONu	Member of the Order of Nunavut	
ONWT; French: OTN-O	Member of the Order of the Northwest Territories	
OY	Member of the Order of Yukon	
=== National Decorations ===
SMV	Recipient of the Star of Military Valour	
SC	Recipient of the Star of Courage	
MSC; French: CSM	Recipient of the Meritorious Service Cross	When awarded the Meritorious Service Cross, francophones use the post-nominal letters CSM for Croix du service méritoire, instead of MSC.
MMV	Recipient of the Medal of Military Valour	
MB	Recipient of the Medal of Bravery	
MSM	Recipient of the Meritorious Service Medal	The post-nominal letters for the Meritorious Service Medal (MSM) are the same in both English and French.
RVM	Recipient of the Royal Victorian Medal	
CD	Recipient of the Canadian Forces' Decoration	
=== Provincial Decorations ===
OMC	Recipient of the Ontario Medal for Good Citizenship	
SVM	Recipient of the Saskatchewan Volunteer Medal	
MGC	Recipient of the British Columbia Medal of Good Citizenship	
=== Appointments to the monarch ===
ADC	Aide-de-Camp to His Majesty	
A de C	Aide-de-Camp to Governor General, Lieutenant Governor or viceroy.	
KC; French: c.r.	King's Counsel; French: conseillier du roi	
KHS	King's Honorary Surgeon	During the reign of a female monarch, the K is replaced with a Q for "queen".
KHP	King's Honorary Physician	During the reign of a female monarch, the K is replaced with a Q for "queen".
KHDS	King's Honorary Dental Surgeon	During the reign of a female monarch, the K is replaced with a Q for "queen".
KHNS or KHN	King's Honorary Nursing Sister or King's Honorary Nurse	During the reign of a female monarch, the K is replaced with a Q for "queen".
KHC	King's Honorary Chaplain	During the reign of a female monarch, the K is replaced with a Q for "queen".
KPO	King's Police Officer	During the reign of a female monarch, the K is replaced with a Q for "queen".
=== Political ===
PC; French: CP	Privy Councillor	A Privy Councillor is also entitled to be styled "The Honourable" or "L'honorable" for life. The post-nominal letters are necessary to denote that someone is a privy councillor because in Canada holding a certain office can also allow the use of The Honourable title. Unlike what is done in the United Kingdom, the post-nominals "PC" have precedence over all Crown honours with two notable exceptions: the Victoria Cross ("VC") and the Cross of Valour ("CV"). In practice, post-nominals are not usually translated from one language to another, but this is an exception.
ECNS	Member of the Executive Council of Nova Scotia	Used for members (including honorary members) of the Executive Council of Nova Scotia since 2007.
ECA	Member of the Executive Council of Alberta	Used for members (including honorary members) of the Executive Council of Alberta. Bill 1 was passed by the Legislative Assembly of Alberta on 24 March 2022. Section 7 stipulates that every member and honorary member of the Executive Council may use these postnominals. Section 6 states that every former living member as of 6 February 2022, and anybody who becomes a former member of the Executive Council, is designated as an honorary member.
ECO	Member of the Executive Council of Ontario	Used for members (including honorary members) of the Executive Council of Ontario since 2025.
MP	Member of House of Commons of Canada	Letters are short for "Member of Parliament". This title is used in Canada and other Commonwealth nations to describe members of the lower house of Parliament only. The Senate of Canada is part of Parliament, but its members are not called MPs.
MPP	Member of the Ontario Legislative Assembly after 1938	Letters are short for "Member of Provincial Parliament". Before 1938, members used MLA.
MNA	Member of the National Assembly of Quebec after 1968	Before 1968, members used MLA.
MLA	Member of the Legislative Assembly	Used for members of provincial and territorial legislatures except Ontario, Quebec, and Newfoundland and Labrador.
MHA	Member of the Newfoundland and Labrador House of Assembly	Only used for members of the Newfoundland and Labrador legislative assembly. Even though Nova Scotia's assembly is called the Nova Scotia House of Assembly, its members are styled MLAs.

== Academic degrees ==
The exact hierarchy of professional degrees relative to academic degrees varies. For example, a Bachelor of Laws degree (LLB) from North American schools is treated as equivalent to a Juris Doctor degree (JD). On the other hand, a Bachelor of Applied Science degree (BASc) at many schools can be done straight out of highschool, and is treated as the same level as academic bachelor's degrees like a Bachelor of Arts degree.

In academic contexts, it is common to give an abbreviation of name of the school awarding the degree after the letters for the degree itself. The way school names are abbreviated can vary. For example, a PhD from Memorial University of Newfoundland can be found written as PhD (MUN) or PhD (Memorial). When a person has multiple degrees from the same school, the school name is only written once, after all degrees from that school.

Post-nominal	Office	Notes
=== Academic doctorates ===
PhD	Doctor of Philosophy, Philosophiae Doctor, Doctorem Philosophiae	Also appears as DPhil.
DBA	Doctor of Business Administration	
DD	Doctor of Divinity	
DLitt	Doctor of Letters	
DSocSci	Doctor of Social Science	
DU	Doctor of the University	Awarded only as an honorary degree.
EdD	Doctor of Education	
EngD	Doctor of Engineering	
JSD	Doctor of Juridical Science	Also appears as SJD.
LLD	Legum Doctor	
=== Professional doctorates ===
MD	Doctor of Medicine	
DMin	Doctor of Ministry	
DDS	Doctor of Dental Surgery	
DNP	Doctor of Nursing Practice	
DO	Doctor of Osteopathic Medicine	
DSW	Doctor of Social Work	
DVM	Doctor of Veterinary Medicine	
JD	Juris Doctor	Considered to be equivalent to the older Bachelor of Laws (LLB). Does not allow use of the prefix "Dr.".
OD	Doctor of Optometry	
PharmD	Doctor of Pharmacy	
PsyD	Doctor of Psychology	
=== Academic master's degrees ===
LLM	Master of Laws	
LMS	Licentiate in Mediaeval Studies	
MA	Master of Arts	
MASc	Master of Applied Science	
MEd	Master of Education	
MEng	Master of Engineering	
MES	Master of Environmental Studies	
MFA	Master of Fine Arts	
MJ	Master of Journalism	
MLIS	Master of Library and Information Science	
MM	Master of Management	
MMath	Master of Mathematics	
MRes	Master of Research	
MSc	Master of Science	
MSci	Master of Science	
MScN	Master of Science in Nursing	
MTM	Master of Technology Management	
MT	Master of Teaching	
MTh	Master of Theology	
=== Professional master's degrees ===
MAcc	Master of Accountancy	
MArch	Master of Architecture	
MBA	Master of Business Administration	
MC	Master of Counselling	
MDiv	Master of Divinity	
MDS	Master of Defence Studies	
MFin	Master of Finance	
MMM	Master of Management and Manufacturing	
MMus	Master of Music	
MPA	Master of Public Administration	
MPH	Master of Public Health	
MSW	Master of Social Work	
MTax	Master of Taxation	
MTS	Master of Theological Studies	
=== Academic bachelor's degrees ===
BA	Bachelor of Arts	A BA done with an extra year (four years instead of three) may be called an honours degree, and may be shown with the postnominals HBA, BAHons, BA(h) or BA4.
BFA	Bachelor of Fine Arts	
BMath	Bachelor of Mathematics	
BCS	Bachelor of Computer Science	
BMgmt	Bachelor of Management	
BSc	Bachelor of Science	
BScN	Bachelor of Science in Nursing	
BSocSc	Bachelor of Social Science	
BSW	Bachelor of Social Work	
BCYC	Bachelor of Child and Youth Care	
BCom	Bachelor of Commerce	
BBA	Bachelor of Business Administration	
BMASc	Bachelor of Military Arts and Science	
BMus	Bachelor of Music	
BJ	Bachelor of Journalism	
BJazz	Bachelor of Jazz Studies	
BPR	Bachelor of Public Relations	
=== Professional bachelor's degrees ===
BASc	Bachelor of Applied Science	Considered to be equivalent to Bachelor of Engineering (BEng). Some schools award the degree BSc for what is, in effect, a BASc.
BEng	Bachelor of Engineering	Considered to be equivalent to the Bachelor of Applied Science (BASc).
BTech	Bachelor of Technology	
BCL	Bachelor of Civil Law	Considered to be equivalent to Licentiate of Laws (LLL).
BEd	Bachelor of Education	
BSW	Bachelor of Social Work	
LLB	Bachelor of Laws	Considered to be equivalent to the Juris Doctor (JD).
LLL	Licentiate of Laws	Considered to be equivalent to the Bachelor of Civil Law (BCL).

== Professional qualifications ==
Post-nominal	Office	Notes
=== Legal positions ===
CJC	Chief Justice of Canada	These letters are only employed (as a convenient short-form) within published law reports, and are not used in correspondence, announcements, etc.
CJ	Chief Justice	These letters are only employed (as a convenient short-form) within published law reports, and are not used in correspondence, announcements, etc.
J, JA	Justice, Appellate Justice	These letters are only employed (as a convenient short-form) within published law reports, and are not used in correspondence, announcements, etc.
CS	Certified Specialist of The Law Society of Ontario	Lawyers who are designated Certified Specialist are recognized and experienced in their field of law and have met high standards imposed by the Law Society of Ontario. This is commonly identified as modern day replacement to the King's Counsel (KC) designation in the province of Ontario, but is not an appointment under the royal prerogative. King's Counsel appointments have been restored in Ontario since the coronation of King Charles III.
Ad. E.	Lawyer Emeritus Quebec Bar	This is the post-1975 replacement for the title of King's Counsel in Quebec, but is not an appointment under the royal prerogative.
=== Academic orders, societies, academicians ===
FCAN	Fellow of the Canadian Academy of Nursing	FCAN has Canadian Nurses Association-Association des infirmières et Infirmiers de Canada (CNA-AIIC) Trademark and is awarded by the Canadian Academy of Nursing (CAN).
FCIC	Fellow of the Chemical Institute of Canada	Awarded by the Chemical Institute of Canada (CIC). Associate members are individuals who supports the objectives of the CIC and are not able to meet the requirements of membership.
MCIC	Member of the Chemical Institute of Canada	Awarded by the Chemical Institute of Canada (CIC). Associate members are individuals who supports the objectives of the CIC and are not able to meet the requirements of membership.
ACIC	Associate Member of the Chemical Institute of Canada	Awarded by the Chemical Institute of Canada (CIC). Associate members are individuals who supports the objectives of the CIC and are not able to meet the requirements of membership.
FCIS	Fellow of the Institute of Chartered Secretaries and Administrators	Awarded by the Institute of Chartered Secretaries and Administrators
ACIS	Associate of the Institute of Chartered Secretaries and Administrators	Awarded by the Institute of Chartered Secretaries and Administrators
ARCT	Associate of the Royal Conservatory of Toronto	Awarded by the Royal Conservatory of Music
ARIDO	Member of the Association of Registered Interior Designers of Ontario	
CAHP	Member of the Canadian Association of Heritage Professionals	
BCSLA	Member of the British Columbia Society of Landscape Architects	
FCFP	Fellow of the College of Family Physicians of Canada	Awarded by The College of Family Physicians of Canada.
MCFP	Member of the College of Family Physicians of Canada	Awarded by The College of Family Physicians of Canada.
CCFP	Certificant of the College of Family Physicians of Canada	Awarded by The College of Family Physicians of Canada.
CSLA	Member of the Canadian Society of Landscape Architects	
C.Psych	Member of the College of Psychologists of Ontario	
CPMHN(C)	Certified in Psychiatric and Mental Health Nursing by the Canadian Nurses Association	
DCAPM	Diplomate of the Canadian Academy of Pain Management	
DipSportMed	Diplomate of the Canadian Academy of Sport and Exercise Medicine	
FRCPC	Fellow of the Royal College of Physicians and Surgeons of Canada (Division of Medicine)	Awarded by the Royal College of Physicians and Surgeons of Canada
FRCSC	Fellow of the Royal College of Physicians and Surgeons of Canada (Division of Surgery)	Awarded by the Royal College of Physicians and Surgeons of Canada
DRCPSC	Diplomate of the Royal College of Physicians and Surgeons of Canada	Awarded by the Royal College of Physicians and Surgeons of Canada
FCAE	Fellow of the Canadian Academy of Engineering	
FCAHS	Fellow of Canadian Academy of Health Sciences	
FCAMPT	Fellow of the Canadian Academy of Manipulative Physical Therapists	
FCASI	Fellow of the Canadian Aeronautics and Space Institute	
FCGmA	Fellow of the Canadian Gemmological Association	
FCIM	Fellow of the Canadian Institute of Mining, Metallurgy and Petroleum	
FCIP	Fellow of the Canadian Institute of Planners	Awarded by the Canadian Institute of Planners.
MCIP	Member of the Canadian Institute of Planners	Awarded by the Canadian Institute of Planners.
FCMS	Fellow of the Canadian Mathematical Society	
FCSI	Fellow of the Canadian Securities Institute	
FEC	Fellow of Engineers Canada	
FEIC	Fellow of the Engineering Institute of Canada	
FIAM	Fellow of the Institute of Asset Management	Awarded by the Institute of Asset Management.
MIAM	Member of the Institute of Asset Management	Awarded by the Institute of Asset Management.
FONA	Fellow of the Ontario Numismatic Association	
FRCA	Fellow of the Royal Canadian Academy of Arts	Awarded by the Royal Canadian Academy of Arts established 1880
RCA	Member of the Royal Canadian Academy of Arts	Awarded by the Royal Canadian Academy of Arts established 1880
FRAIC	Fellow of the Royal Architectural Institute of Canada	Awarded by the Royal Architectural Institute of Canada.
MRAIC	Member of the Royal Architectural Institute of Canada	Awarded by the Royal Architectural Institute of Canada.
FRASC	Fellow of the Royal Astronomical Society of Canada	
FRCCO	Fellow of the Royal Canadian College of Organists	
FRCDC	Fellow of the Royal College of Dentists of Canada	
FRCGS	Fellow of the Royal Canadian Geographical Society	
FRCNA	Fellow of the Royal Canadian Numismatic Association	
FRHSC	Fellow of the Royal Heraldry Society of Canada	Awarded by the Royal Heraldry Society of Canada
LRHSC	Licentiate of the Royal Heraldry Society of Canada	Awarded by the Royal Heraldry Society of Canada
FRPSC	Fellow of the Royal Philatelic Society of Canada	
FRSA	Fellow of the Royal Society for the Encouragement of Arts, Manufactures and Commerce	
FRSC; French: MSRC	Fellow of the Royal Society of Canada	
MAIBC	Member of the Architectural Institute of British Columbia	
OAA	Member of the Ontario Association of Architects	
rmc	Graduate of the Royal Military College of Canada	Students who graduate from the Royal Military College of Canada, the Collège militaire royal de Saint-Jean (CMR), or the Royal Roads Military College (RRMC) having successfully completed the four interlocking components merit the "rmc" post nominal. This post nominal is presented by the Minister of National Defence to individuals upon successful completion of the four components, which are academics (undergraduate degree), leadership, athletics, and bilingualism.
HonFSBCE	Honorary Fellow of the Society of British & Commonwealth Entrepreneurs	Awarded by the Society of British & Commonwealth Entrepreneurs
HonMSBCE	Honorary Member of the Society of British & Commonwealth Entrepreneurs	Awarded by the Society of British & Commonwealth Entrepreneurs
FSBCE	Fellow of the Society of British & Commonwealth Entrepreneurs	Awarded by the Society of British & Commonwealth Entrepreneurs
MSBCE	Member of the Society of British & Commonwealth Entrepreneurs	Awarded by the Society of British & Commonwealth Entrepreneurs
FNI	Fellow of The Nautical Institute	Awarded by The Nautical Institute
AFNI	Associate Fellow of The Nautical Institute	Awarded by The Nautical Institute
MNI	Member of The Nautical Institute	Awarded by The Nautical Institute
AMNI	Associate Member of The Nautical Institute	Awarded by The Nautical Institute
=== Professional qualifications ===
==== Art and graphic design ====
CCE	Member of the Canadian Cinema Editors	
CSC	Member of the Canadian Society of Cinematographers	
CDC	Member of the Casting Directors Society of Canada	
CDP	Certified Member of the Design Professionals of Canada	
RGD	Certified Member of the Association of Registered Graphic Designers	
==== Teaching, counseling, and dispute resolution ====
CMed	Chartered Mediator	Awarded by the ADR Institute of Canada.
QMed	Qualified Mediator	Awarded by the ADR Institute of Canada.
CArb	Chartered Arbitrator	Awarded by the ADR Institute of Canada.
QArb	Qualified Arbitrator	Awarded by the ADR Institute of Canada.
RRM	Registered Roster Mediator	Registered Roster Mediators or RRMs are mediators and med-arbitrators who have met the stringent knowledge, skills, experience, and ethics standards for admission to one of Mediate BC's rosters. Mediate BC exists to serve the public: the RRM allows the public to identify mediators who are committed to Mediate BC's Standards of Conduct and meet ongoing requirements for continuing professional development.
RCIC	Regulated Canadian Immigration Consultant	Awarded by the College of Immigration and Citizenship Consultants
RISIA	Regulated International Student Immigration Advisor	Awarded by the College of Immigration and Citizenship Consultants
OCT	Ontario Certified Teacher	
OCELT	Ontario Certified English Language Teacher	The designation was granted in early 2017, and is automatically applied to accredited members of TESL Ontario.
FOTF	Fellow of the Ontario Teachers' Federation	This designation was established in 1964 in commemoration of the twentieth anniversary of the founding of the Ontario Teachers' Federation.
FEA	Certified Family Enterprise Advisor and Member of the Institute of Family Enterprise Advisors	
RSW	Registered Social Worker	
RECE	Registered Early Childhood Educator	
CTC	Certified Travel Councillor	
CTM	Certified Travel Manager	
==== Engineering and skilled trades ====
P.Eng.	Professional engineer	By law, can only be used by members of a provincial or territorial engineering regulator. See Canadian Council of Professional Engineers.
EIT	Engineer in training/engineering intern	
StrucEng	Structural engineer	
CTech	Certified engineering technician	In most parts of the country, membership in a regulatory organization is needed to use the title, but is not needed to practice. See Canadian Council of Technicians and Technologists.
CET	Certified engineering technologist	In most parts of the country, membership in a regulatory organization is needed to use the title, but is not needed to practice. See Canadian Council of Technicians and Technologists.
AScT	Applied science technologist	In most parts of the country, membership in a regulatory organization is needed to use the title, but is not needed to practice. See Canadian Council of Technicians and Technologists.
PTech	Professional technologist	Exact meaning varies considerably across the country.
LET	Licensed engineering technologist	Used only in Ontario.
RET	Registered engineering technologist	Used only in Alberta. No longer being issued since October 2009, and replaced by PTech.
GSC	Gold Seal Certification	Organized by the Canadian Construction Association
GSI	Gold Seal Intern	Organized by the Canadian Construction Association
P.GSC	Professional Gold Seal Certification	Organized by the Canadian Construction Association
ME	Master Electrician	Provincially regulated license. In Ontario, it is regulated by the Electrical Safety Authority, previously known as Ontario Hydro, through the Electricity Act of 1998, O.Reg 570/05.
RSE	Red Seal Endorsement	Interprovincial qualification endorsement for skilled trade professionals in Canada. Awarded by provincial associations in coordination with Canadian Council of Directors of Apprenticeship. In Ontario, the program is facilitated by The Ontario College of Trades.
ISP	Information Systems Professional	
PQS	Professional Quantity Surveyor	
CEC	Construction Estimator Certified	
==== Financial Advisors and Planners ====
CFP	Certified Financial Planner	Awarded by FP Canada.
QAFP	Qualified Associate Financial Planner	Awarded by FP Canada.
CLU	Chartered Life Underwriter	Awarded by Advocis.
PFA	Professional Financial Advisor	Awarded by Advocis.
CIM	Chartered Investment Manager	
PFP	Personal Financial Planner	
RFRA	Registered Financial and Retirement Advisor	Awarded by CIFP Retirement Institute.
RRA	Registered Retirement Analyst	Awarded by CIFP Retirement Institute.
RRC	Registered Retirement Consultant	Awarded by CIFP Retirement Institute.
TEP	Trust and Estate Practitioner	Awarded by STEP Canada.
==== Land surveying and urban planning ====
ALS	Alberta Land Surveyor	
BCLS	British Columbia Land Surveyor	
CLS	Canada Lands Surveyor	
MLS	Manitoba Land Surveyor	
OLS	Ontario Land Surveyor	
SLS	Saskatchewan Land Surveyor	
GISP	Geographic Information Systems (GIS) Professional	
RPP	Registered Professional Planner	
==== Medical practice ====
CCPE	Canadian certified physician executive	
PHN	Public health nurse	
RM	Registered midwife	
RN	Registered nurse	Required to pass the National Council Licensure Examination, except for in Quebec, which has its own exam.
ACP	Advanced Care Paramedic	Required to pass the Canadian Organization of Paramedic Regulators National Examination. Paramedicine is a regulated profession in all 10 Canadian provinces.
PCP	Primary Care Paramedic	Required to pass the Canadian Organization of Paramedic Regulators National Examination. Paramedicine is a regulated profession in all 10 Canadian provinces.
RO	Registered optician	
RRT	Registered respiratory therapist	
CCC	Certified Canadian counsellor	
CCPA	Canadian certified physician assistant	
CT	Clinical Traumatologist	
CWT	Community and Workplace Traumatologist	
NP	Nurse practitioner	
LPN	Licensed practical nurse	
RPN	Registered psychiatric nurse Registered practical nurse	
RPh	Registered pharmacist	
R.Kin		On June 4, 2007, the Kinesiology Act was enacted making the designation "kinesiologist" a legal and protected designation in Ontario.
RDH	Registered dental hygienist	
DD	Denturism degree	
==== Medical technology and inspection ====
CRSP; French: PSAC	Canadian Registered Safety Professional	Awarded by the Board of Canadian Registered Safety Professionals
CRST	Canadian Registered Safety Technician	Awarded by the Board of Canadian Registered Safety Professionals
CPHI(C)	Certificate in Public Health Inspection (Canada)	
CIC	Certification in Infection Control	
ROH	Registered Occupational Hygienist	Awarded by Canadian Registered Board of Occupational Hygienists.
ROHT		
MLT	Medical Laboratory Technologist	
RD	Registered Dietitian	
RMT	Registered Massage Therapist	
CHE	Certified health executive	
MRT	Medical radiation technologist	
RPSGT	Registered polysomnographic technologist	
CBET(c)	Certified biomedical engineering technologist/technician	On April 8, 1982, The Canadian Board of Examiners for Biomedical Engineering Technologists and Technicians was approved by the International Certification Commission (ICC) to certify Biomedical Engineering Technologists and Technicians in Canada.
cdt	Certified dialysis technologist/technician	On June 8, 2009, at the annual meeting of the International Certification Commission (ICC) in Baltimore, Maryland, a revised certification program of The Canadian Board of Examiners for Biomedical Engineering Technologists and Technicians (BMET Board) that include a "cdt" designation for Certified Dialysis Technologists and Technicians was approved. The BMET Board changed its name to The Canadian Board of Examiners for Biomedical Engineering and Dialysis Technologists and Technicians, (Le Jury Canadien D'Accréditation en Génie Biomédical Pour Les Technologues et Les Techniciens) to reflect the addition of dialysis certification to the program.
RDT	Registered dental technician	
==== Science ====
C.Chem	Chartered Chemist	The Association of the Chemical Profession of Ontario (ACPO), legally constituted in 1963 by a provincial Act, sets strict academic standards for its members and monitors their professional and ethical conduct. These members are "Chartered Chemists", permitted to use the designation "C.Chem" after their names.
PGeo	Professional Geoscientist	In some provinces, use of this title is restricted by law to members of the provincial regulatory body.
PGeol	Professional Geologist	
PGeoph	Professional Geophysicist	
PPhys	Professional Physicist	
RPBio	Registered Professional Biologist	
P.Ag	Professional Agrologist	In some provinces, professionals practicing agrology must register with a provincial regulatory body. In Quebec agr is used instead of P. Ag.
EP	Environmental Professional	
RPF	Registered Professional Forester	
==== Finance, business, and management ====
Acc.Dir.	Accredited Director of The Chartered Governance Institute of Canada	The Chartered Governance Institute of Canada is the Canadian division of the Chartered Governance Institute.
ACG	Associate Member of The Chartered Governance Institute of Canada with Chartered status.	The Chartered Governance Institute of Canada is the Canadian division of the Chartered Governance Institute.
FCG	Fellow Member of The Chartered Governance Institute of Canada with Chartered status.	The Chartered Governance Institute of Canada is the Canadian division of the Chartered Governance Institute.
CA	Chartered Accountant	Awarded by CPA Canada. The accounting bodies responsible for granting the CGA, CMA, and CA were merged into CPA Canada in 2014. The CPA designation is the only accounting designation that is obtainable presently.
CGA	Certified General Accountant	Awarded by CPA Canada. The accounting bodies responsible for granting the CGA, CMA, and CA were merged into CPA Canada in 2014. The CPA designation is the only accounting designation that is obtainable presently.
CMA	Certified Management Accountant	Awarded by CPA Canada. The accounting bodies responsible for granting the CGA, CMA, and CA were merged into CPA Canada in 2014. The CPA designation is the only accounting designation that is obtainable presently.
CPA	Chartered Professional Accountant	Awarded by CPA Canada. The accounting bodies responsible for granting the CGA, CMA, and CA were merged into CPA Canada in 2014. The CPA designation is the only accounting designation that is obtainable presently.
CAE	Certified Association Executive	
MXC	Member Excellence Certified	
CAMA	Certified Asset Management Assessor	Asset management qualifications are awarded by the PEMAC Asset Management Association of Canada. WPiAM administers CAMA through the association. CTAM, CPAM, and CSAM are part of the Global Certification Scheme developed to ensure international alignment of competencies in the Asset Management practice.
CAMP	Certified Asset Management Professional.	Asset management qualifications are awarded by the PEMAC Asset Management Association of Canada. WPiAM administers CAMA through the association. CTAM, CPAM, and CSAM are part of the Global Certification Scheme developed to ensure international alignment of competencies in the Asset Management practice.
CTAM	Certified Technical Specialist in Asset Management	Asset management qualifications are awarded by the PEMAC Asset Management Association of Canada. WPiAM administers CAMA through the association. CTAM, CPAM, and CSAM are part of the Global Certification Scheme developed to ensure international alignment of competencies in the Asset Management practice.
CPAM	Certified Practitioner in Asset Management	Asset management qualifications are awarded by the PEMAC Asset Management Association of Canada. WPiAM administers CAMA through the association. CTAM, CPAM, and CSAM are part of the Global Certification Scheme developed to ensure international alignment of competencies in the Asset Management practice.
CSAM	Certified Senior Principal in Asset Management	Asset management qualifications are awarded by the PEMAC Asset Management Association of Canada. WPiAM administers CAMA through the association. CTAM, CPAM, and CSAM are part of the Global Certification Scheme developed to ensure international alignment of competencies in the Asset Management practice.
MMP	Maintenance Management Professional	Asset management qualifications are awarded by the PEMAC Asset Management Association of Canada. WPiAM administers CAMA through the association. CTAM, CPAM, and CSAM are part of the Global Certification Scheme developed to ensure international alignment of competencies in the Asset Management practice.
CAPM	Certified Associate in Project Management	Awarded by the Project Management Institute.
PMP	Project Management Professional	Awarded by the Project Management Institute.
CBHF	Companion of the Canadian Business Hall of Fame	Part of the Canadian Business Hall of Fame.
OBHF	Officer of the Canadian Business Hall of Fame	Part of the Canadian Business Hall of Fame.
CCP	Certified Credit Professional	In 1928, the Government of Canada created the Credit Institute of Canada (CIC) through a Special Act of Parliament. The mandate of the CIC is to provide rigorous training, examination and continuous learning to credit professionals who protect the wealth of Canada's companies and institutions. The institute is the only government-recognized body in Canada to issue the CCP designation in the field of Commercial Credit.
C.Dir	Chartered Director	
CE	Credentialed Evaluator	Awarded by the Canadian Evaluation Society
CFA	Chartered Financial Analyst	
CFRE	Certified Fund Raising Executive	
C. Mgr.	Chartered Manager	
CPHR	Chartered Professional in Human Resources	
CCLP	CITT-Certified Logistics Professional	
CMC	Certified Management Consultant	
ICD.D	Institute of Corporate Directors, Director	
OLCM	Ontario Licensed Condominium Manager	Completion of necessary education and experience requirements to be licensed by the Condominium Management Regulatory Authority of Ontario (CMRAO).
PLog	Professional Logistician	
RP	Registered Parliamentarian	Awarded by the National Association of Parliamentarians.
PRP	Professional Registered Parliamentarian	Awarded by the National Association of Parliamentarians.
CCS	Certified Customs Specialist	
P. App. CRA	Professional Appraiser - Canadian Residential Appraiser	Awarded by the Appraisal Institute of Canada.
P. App. AACI	Professional Appraiser - Accredited Appraiser Canadian Institute	Awarded by the Appraisal Institute of Canada.
CFF	Certified in Financial Forensics	
CBV	Chartered Business Valuator	
CPM	Certified Payroll Manager	Awarded by the Canadian Payroll Association.
PCP	Payroll Compliance Practitioner	Awarded by the Canadian Payroll Association.
(F)CIP	(Fellow) Chartered Insurance Professional	
CRM	Canadian Risk Management	
CIA	Certified Internal Auditor	

== Hereditary titles ==
Post-nominal	Office	Notes
Bt; Btss	Baronet or Baronetess	A small number of baronetcies were created for Canadians, such as the Tupper baronetcy, and some still have living heirs. When used, it comes before all other Canadian honours. For more information, see Canadian peers and baronets.
UE	United Empire Loyalists	U.E. is based on Lord Dorchester's Order in Council in 1789, which was meant to differentiate loyalists from later settlers. Entitled to use these letters are descendants of: Either male or female, as of 19 April 1775, a resident of the American colonies, and joined the Royal Standard prior to the Treaty of Separation of 1783, or otherwise demonstrated loyalty to the Crown, and settled in territory remaining under the rule of the Crown; or; a soldier who served in an American Loyalist Regiment and was disbanded in Canada; or; a member of the Six Nations of either the Grand River or the Bay of Quinte Reserve who is descended from one whose migration was similar to that of other Loyalists. (Dorchester Proclamation is found on uelac.org).

== British post-nominals used alongside Canadian ones ==
Any person who, prior to 1 June 1972, was a member of a British order or the recipient of a British decoration or medal may use the post-nominal letters for the decoration or medal together with those of any Canadian order, decoration or medal.

Canadians can still be awarded British medals, as well as those from other countries, but this must first be approved by the Government of Canada. (See Nickle Resolution)

Post-nominal	Office	Notes
=== British higher decorations ===
VC	Victoria Cross	The letters VC can also refer to the Canadian Victoria Cross, but that decoration has never been awarded.
GC	George Cross	
=== British orders ===
CH	Order of the Companions of Honour	
CB	Companion of the Order of the Bath	
CMG	Companion of the Order of St. Michael and St. George	
CBE	Commander of the Order of the British Empire	
DSO	Distinguished Service Order	
OBE	Officer of the Order of the British Empire	
ISO	Imperial Service Order	
MBE	Member of the Order of the British Empire	
=== British decorations ===
RRC	Member of the Royal Red Cross	
DSC	Distinguished Service Cross	
MC	Military Cross	
DFC	Distinguished Flying Cross	
AFC	Air Force Cross	
SMV	Star of Military Valour	
SC	Star of Courage	
MSC	Meritorious Service Cross	
MMV	Medal of Military Valour	
MB	Medal of Bravery	
MSM	Meritorious Service Medal	
ARRC	Associate of the Royal Red Cross	
DCM	Distinguished Conduct Medal	
CGM	Conspicuous Gallantry Medal	
GM	George Medal	
DSM	Distinguished Service Medal	
MM	Military Medal	
DFM	Distinguished Flying Medal	
AFM	Air Force Medal	
QGM	Queen's Gallantry Medal	
BEM	British Empire Medal	

== The Most Venerable Order of the Hospital of St. John of Jerusalem ==
Post-nominal	Office	Notes
GCStJ	Bailiff or Dame Grand Cross of the Most Venerable Order of the Hospital of St. John of Jerusalem	External use of post-nominals is currently under review by Rideau Hall. Presently, St. John post-nominals can only be used within the order itself. The sequence to wear modern Canadian orders, decorations, and medals can be found at the Government of Canada, Department of National Defence website. Listed at each order, decoration, and medal is whether or not a post-nominal is authorized. Often shortened to the Most Venerable Order of St. John. Serving Member was formerly "SBStJ/SSStJ" for Serving Brother / Sister of the Most Venerable Order of the Hospital of St. John of Jerusalem.
KStJ; DStJ	Knight or Dame of the Most Venerable Order of the Hospital of St. John of Jerusalem	
CStJ	Commander of the Most Venerable Order of the Hospital of St. John of Jerusalem	
OStJ	Officer of the Most Venerable Order of the Hospital of St. John of Jerusalem	
MStJ	Serving Member of the Most Venerable Order of the Hospital of St. John of Jerusalem.	

== See also ==
- Orders, decorations, and medals of Canada
- Canadian honorifics
