= The Society of Certified Engineering Technicians and Technologists of Nova Scotia =

Engineering organization of Canada

- Founded: 1967
- Purpose: Certification of engineering technicians and technologists
- Location: 202 Brownlow Avenue, Suite 308, Dartmouth, Nova Scotia
- Region served: Nova Scotia
- Method: National Technology Benchmarks
- Affiliations: Canadian Council of Technicians and Technologists
- Website: technova.ca

The Society of Certified Engineering Technicians and Technologists of Nova Scotia, also called TechNova Certified Technology Professionals, is Nova Scotia's independent certifying body for engineering/applied science technicians and technologists.

TechNova confers the post-nominal designations of C.Tech. (certified technician), and A.Sc.T. (Applied science technologist) which are symbols of achievement in engineering/applied science technology and are legally protected for use only by fully certified members in good standing. The designations are recognized across Canada by many employers and other engineering professionals through the efforts of provincial associations that make up the Canadian Council of Technicians and Technologists (CCTT). Through CCTT being a signatory, TechNova Certified Technology Professionals recognizes international transferability through the Sydney Accord, the Dublin Accord and the Engineering Technologist Mobility Forum, which confers the ability to award the designation IntET(Canada) for Technologists who wish to work internationally.

The Society of Certified Engineering Technicians and Technologists of Nova Scotia, was established in 1967. Today, they identify themselves with the name TechNova Certified Technology Professionals.

Certified engineering technologists are bound by a specific code of ethics and rules of professional conduct.

The society is mandated and empowered by the Applied Science Technology Act of Nova Scotia.

== See also ==
- Engineering technologist
- Engineering Technician
