= Applied science technology and engineering technology in Canada =

In Canada, a new occupational category of "technologist" was established in the 1960s in conjunction with an emerging system of community colleges and technical institutes. It was designed to effectively bridge the gap between the increasingly theoretical nature of engineering science degrees and the predominantly practical approach of technician and trades programs. Provincial associations may certify individuals as a professional technologist (P.Tech), certified engineering technologist (C.E.T.), registered engineering technologist (R.E.T.), applied science technologist (AScT) or technologue professionel (T.P.). These provincial associations are constituent members of the Canadian Council of Technicians and Technologists (CCTT), which nationally accredits technology programs across Canada through its Canadian Technology Accreditation Board (CTAB). Nationally accredited engineering technology programs range from two to three years in length, depending on province, with two-year programs leading to a C.Tech. certification and three-year programs usually leading to an AScT, CET or RET certification.
