= Island Technology Professionals =

Organization of Canada

Coordinates: 46°14′0.40″N 63°7′35.41″W

- Founded: 1972
- Purpose: Certification of Applied Science and Engineering Technicians and Technologists
- Location: 92 Queen Street, Charlottetown, PEI, Canada
- Origins: Trade name of the Association of Certified Engineering Technicians and Technologists of Prince Edward Island
- Region served: PEI
- Method: National Technology Benchmarks (2014)
- Members: 130
- Key people: Ryan Webster, CET (President)
- Employees: 0
- Volunteers: 10
- Website: http://www.techpei.ca/

The Island Technology Professionals is Prince Edward Island's independent certifying body for engineering/applied science technicians and technologists. It is an official trade name of the Association of Certified Engineering Technicians and Technologists of Prince Edward Island (ACETTPEI).

== Designations ==
Island Technology Professionals confers the following designations, which are symbols of achievement in engineering/applied science technology and are legally protected for use only by fully certified members:

- C.Tech. (Certified Technician)
- C.E.T. (Certified Engineering Technologist)
- A.Sc.T. (Certified Applied Science Technologist)

The designations are recognized across Canada by many employers and other engineering professionals through the Canadian Council of Technicians and Technologists (CCTT). With CCTT as a signatory, Island Technology Professionals recognizes international transferability through the Sydney Accord, the Dublin Accord and the Engineering Technologist Mobility Forum. This confers ability to award the designation IntET(Canada) to technologists who wish to work internationally.

== History ==
Island Technology Professionals, under the name Prince Edward Island Society of Engineering Technicians and Technologists (PEISETT), was established in 1972.

ACETTPEI registered the tradename Island Technology Professionals in 2019.

== See also ==
- Engineering technologist
- Engineering technician
- Applied science technologist
- Professional technologist
