= Certified engineering technologist =

Canadian professional title

Certified engineering technologist (CET) is a Canadian professional certification awarded on the basis of academic qualification and work experience. Abbreviated as C.E.T., most Canadian provincial engineering and applied science technology associations offer this certification. Certification is voluntary and does not represent a provincial regulatory requirement or a statutory required license.

== Definition ==
The ASET website defines a certified engineering technologist as

"A professional, who through academic training and experience in the application of engineering or scientific principles, is capable of assuming responsibility and exercising independent judgement in the practice of engineering or applied science technology.

Carries out a wide range of complex work, either independently or under general direction.

Typical activities include design, production, marketing, testing, quality control, estimating, surveying, inspection, diagnostic evaluation, supervision, management, technical sales and teaching. Such activities may be carried out in association with other professionals.

Uses an applied approach based on a comprehensive understanding of a specific technology.

Evaluates assignments, determines procedures and implements solutions, schedules work to meet objectives, participates in short- and long-range planning, and may become involved in developing and promoting conceptual change.

May assume managerial or administrative responsibility for a wide range of technical endeavours.

May supervise and coordinate a diverse working group and train less experienced technical and professional staff."

== Requirements for certification ==
Each province's certifying body is responsible for determining the standards by which Engineering Technologists are certified. However, most jurisdictions do have some commonalities:

- Graduation from a two or three year post-secondary program in engineering or applied science technology approved by the Canadian Technology Accreditation Board. CTAB accreditation is not required in Quebec.
- Two years of work experience in the field that certification is sought.
- Completion of an application, work history and submission of professional references.
- Submission of a technology report of substantial content. In some provinces, completion of an accredited technology program removes this requirement.
- Completion of a professional practice examination.

== Legislation and professional organizations ==
Certified engineering technologist (abbreviated "C.E.T."), registered engineering technologist (abbreviated "R.E.T."), and applied science technologist" (abbreviated "A.Sc.T.") are voluntary certifications and are not a provincial regulatory requirement or a statutory required license, there is no legal requirement for membership. Certification is managed individually by each province. In Alberta, professional technologists abbreviated "P.Tech" are required to have a limited license to practice professional engineering within a defined scope.

Certification is protected and managed by provincial law.

=== New Brunswick ===
Certification is managed by New Brunswick Society of Certified Engineering Technicians and Technologists. Certified professionals are bound by a specific code of ethics.

The society is mandated and empowered by the Engineering Technology Act of New Brunswick.

=== Nova Scotia ===
Certification is managed by a council of The Society of Certified Engineering Technicians and Technologists of Nova Scotia, also called "TechNova Certified Technology Professionals". Certified professionals are bound by a specific code of ethics.

The society is mandated and empowered by the Applied Science Technology Act of Nova Scotia.

=== Prince Edward Island ===
Certification is managed by Island Technology Professionals. Certified professionals are bound by a specific code of ethics.

The association is mandated and empowered by the Applied Science and Engineering Technicians and Technologists Act

=== Newfoundland ===
Certification is managed by the Association of Engineering Technicians and Technologists of Newfoundland and Labrador. Certified professionals are bound by a specific code of ethics.

There doesn't appear to be a specific applied science technology act or engineering technology act in Newfoundland.

=== Quebec ===
Certification in Quebec is called "Professional Technologist", or "technologue professionel". Certification is managed by the Ordre des Technologues Professionnels du Quebec.

Members who earn this designation are allowed to carry out certain activities and seal certain engineering documents normally reserved for engineers.

For more information, see: Professional technologist

=== Ontario ===
Certification is managed by the Ontario Association of Certified Engineering Technicians and Technologists. Certified professionals are bound by a specific code of ethics and rules of professional conduct.

The association is mandated and empowered by the Ontario Association of Certified Engineering Technicians and Technologists Act of Ontario.

=== Manitoba ===
Certification is managed by the Certified Technicians and Technologists Association of Manitoba. Certified professionals are bound by a specific code of ethics and rules of professional conduct.

The association is mandated and empowered by the Certified Applied Science Technologists Act of Manitoba.

=== Saskatchewan ===
Certification in Saskatchewan is called "Applied Science Technologist", abbreviated "A.Sc.T."

Certification is managed by the Saskatchewan Applied Science Technologists & Technicians. Certified professionals are bound by a specific code of ethics and rules of professional conduct.

The association is mandated and empowered by the Technologists and Technicians act of Saskatchewan.

=== Alberta ===
Certification is managed by the Association of Science and Engineering Technology Professionals of Alberta. Certified professionals are bound by a specific code of ethics and rules of professional conduct, as well as a set of bylaws. and regulations.

In addition to certification, ASET is able to provide a "Professional Technologist" designation, which makes that person eligible to practice engineering within a scope of practice specified by a board of examiners.

Unlike other provinces, Alberta authorizes the creation of ASET and the regulation of the title of Engineering Technologist in their Engineering and Geoscience Professions act.

=== British Columbia ===
Certification in British Columbia is called "applied science technologist", abbreviated "A.Sc.T." and is closely related to a certified engineering technician, abbreviated "C.Tech"

Certification is managed by The Applied Science Technologists and Technicians of British Columbia. Certified professionals are bound by a specific code of ethics and rules of professional conduct. Technologists and technicians contribute to the overall engineering team in different functional capacities. Technicians frequently support engineers or technologists; providing design input via feedback loop when troubleshooting operational equipment.

The organization registers Applied Science Technologists (A.Sc.T.) and Certified Technicians (C.Tech) in the engineering disciplines and professional recognition and definitions is governed by Bill 49 – 2018: Professional Governance Act in British Columbia. Each engineering team member has a professional seal and qualifies for independent professional liability insurance within their practice.

=== Nunavut ===
Nunavut has no professional association for the occupation of engineering technologist.

As well, they do not appear to have an act regarding the profession of engineering technology.

=== Yukon Territory ===
The Yukon Territory is offers residents certification by the Applied Science Technologists & Technicians of BC for the occupation of applied science and engineering technologist.

=== Northwest Territory ===
The Northwest territory does not appear to have a professional association for the occupation of engineering technologist.

As well, they do not appear to have an act regarding the profession of engineering technology.

Engineering technologist in the Northwest Territories are regulated by the Alberta association.

== Rights and responsibilities ==
Certification is a provincial jurisdiction, so the rights and responsibilities of certified engineering technologists can vary.

=== Code of ethics ===
In every province, certified engineering technologists are required to follow the professional code of ethics laid out by the certifying body.

The code of ethics can vary from province to province, but the following is representative of what is contained in many province's code of ethics:

1. Hold paramount the safety, health and welfare of the public, the protection of the environment and the promotion of health and safety within the workplace;
2. Undertake and accept responsibility for professional assignments only when qualified by training or experience;
3. Provide an opinion on a professional subject only when it is founded upon adequate knowledge and honest conviction;
4. Act with integrity towards clients or employers, maintain confidentiality and avoid a conflict of interest but, where such conflict arises, fully disclose the circumstances without delay to the employer or client;
5. Uphold the principle of appropriate and adequate compensation for the performance of their work;
6. Keep informed to maintain proficiency and competence, to advance the body of knowledge within their discipline and further opportunities for the professional development of their associates;
7. Conduct themselves with fairness, courtesy and good faith towards clients, colleagues and others, give credit where it is due and accept, as well as give, honest and fair professional comment;
8. Present clearly to employers and clients the possible consequences if professional decisions or judgments are overruled or disregarded;
9. Report to the appropriate agencies any hazardous, illegal or unethical professional decisions or practices by other members or others; and
10. Promote public knowledge and appreciation of applied science and engineering technology and protect the Association from misrepresentation and misunderstanding.

Failure to follow the code of ethics can result in loss of certification, as well as fines from the certifying body.

=== Ability to practice Engineering ===
In all provinces and territories, it is unlawful to practice Professional engineering and hold yourself as a Professional Engineer without a license to practice. However, some provinces provide exemptions allowing certified engineering technologists to practice under certain circumstances.

- In Nova Scotia, the Engineering Professions Act does not include the word "technologist, suggesting that only a Professional Engineer may practice Professional Engineering as defined in the Act.
- In Prince Edward island, anyone following their trade, profession, or calling is not prevented from practicing in that capacity as long as they don't hold themselves as professional engineers unless so licensed. Certified engineering technologists may perform engineering work where a Professional Engineer takes responsibility for the application of the technology.
- In Newfoundland, their 'An Act Respecting the practice of Engineering and Geoscience' does not allow for technologists to practice engineering.
- In Quebec, the engineers act lists certain engineering activities a professional technologist is able to legally exercise, some independently, some using specifications written by an engineer.
- In Ontario, certification does not allow a person to practice Professional Engineering as defined by the Professional Engineers Act of Ontario unless supervised by a licensed Professional Engineer. However, an engineering technologist can be granted a limited license to practice within a certain scope of work.
- In Manitoba, the Engineering and Geoscientific Professions Act includes an exemption for certified engineering technologists: "Nothing in this Act applies to prevent [...] a person who is certified under The Certified Applied Science Technologists Act in an engineering discipline, from engaging in an act that constitutes the occupation of applied science technology". Regardless, certified technologists are not allowed to use the titles professional engineer; engineer; or consulting engineer, and the practice of professional engineering is prohibited. Where there is overlap between the two disciplines, a joint board will decide disputes.
- In Saskatchewan, the Engineering and Geoscientific Professions Act includes an exemption for certified engineering technologists: "[so long as they are not employed as a Professional Engineer,] nothing in this Act prevents:[...] a person from practising as an applied science technologist or a certified technician within the meaning of The Saskatchewan Applied Science Technologists and Technicians Act".
- In Alberta, a Certified Technician (C.Tech.) is a technology professional who performs routine technical procedures with occasional direct supervision and who may assume limited responsibility for any decision-making process. A certified engineering technologist (C.E.T.) is a technology professional who is capable of assuming responsibility and exercising independent judgment to perform technical tasks and solve problems in complex technological areas with limited direct supervision.
- In British Columbia, only a Professional Engineer or those working under a professional engineer may practice professional engineering. However; the Professional Engineering and Geoscientists act gives The Association of Professional Engineers and Geoscientists of the Province of British Columbia the power to establish and monitor compliance with standards of training and experience required for licensees, and the enrolment and qualifications for a limited licensee, including limited licences for applied science technologists.
- In Nunavut, the Engineering Professions Act does not include the word "technologist, suggesting that only a Professional Engineer may practice Professional Engineering as defined in the Act.
- In the Yukon Territory, the Engineering Professions Act allows for an applied science technologist to be granted limited license to practice professional engineering after 8 years of work.
- In the Northwest Territory, the Engineering Professions Act does not include the word "technologist, suggesting that only a Professional Engineer may practice Professional Engineering as defined in the Act.

== Right to use of title ==
In Canada, the title of C.E.T., which is used as a post-nominal, is generally protected by provincial legislation. One cannot use the title or hold that one is a certified engineering technologist unless so certified, by a provincial body associated with the Canadian Council of Technicians and Technologists, unless stipulated otherwise by provincial legislation.

In some provinces this title may be replaced with applied science technologist (AScT), registered engineering technologist (RET), or more recently professional technologist (P.Tech) to more closely align with professional engineers who use the title (P.Eng).

The 1995 agreement on internal trade (amended since), agreed upon by all provinces except Nunavut, lays out the general principles of transferability of professional certifications between provinces. Specifically, chapter 7 spells out the principles of professional certification.

Internationally, transferability of this title by members of Canadian Council of Technicians and Technologists affiliated associations is governed by the Sydney Accord.

Unlike the Red Seal Journeyman certification, which is automatically and freely recognized in all provinces and territories, Membership in one provincial organization does not automatically and freely provide the ability to use the C.E.T. designation in all provinces. For example, in the province of Ontario, being a member of the Certified Engineering Technicians and Technologists Association of Manitoba does not provide the ability to use the C.E.T. title in Ontario. The options available are to either transfer their membership to the Ontario Association of Certified Engineering Technicians and Technologists, or to maintain a membership in both provinces.

Alberta and British Columbia have the Trade, Investment, and Labour Mobility Agreement, which allows professionals and tradesmen certified in one province to use their title in the other province.

== See also ==
- Engineering technician
- Engineering technologist
- Incorporated engineer
