= International engineering technologist =

Professional certification

The international engineering technologist (IntET) designation of Canada is a professional certification recognized over provincial borders and over some national borders. Technology Professionals Canada offers this certification. It is awarded on the basis of academic qualification and work experience.

The IntET designation is recognized and protected in Australia, Canada, Hong Kong, Ireland, New Zealand, South Africa and the United Kingdom.

To qualify for this certification, a technologist must:

- be a certified engineering technologist in Canada
- have a minimum of seven years practical work experience
- have a minimum of two years in a management or supervisory role
- agree to be bound by an international code of ethics
- demonstrate professional development activities for the past 5 years
