= Association of Engineering Technicians and Technologists of Newfoundland and Labrador =

Technical organization of Canada

- Founded: 1968
- Purpose: Certification of engineering technicians and technologists
- Location: Suite 3008, 29-31 Pippy Place, St. John's, NL A1B 3X2
- Region served: Newfoundland and Labrador
- Method: National Technology Benchmarks
- Members: 1,200
- Website: www.aettnl.com

The Association of Engineering Technicians and Technologists of Newfoundland and Labrador (AETTNL) is Newfoundland and Labrador's independent certifying body for engineering/applied science technicians and technologists.

AETTNL confers the post-nominal designations of C .Tech. (certified technician), P. Tech (professional technologist), and A.Sc.T. (applied science technologist) which are symbols of achievement in engineering/applied science technology and are legally protected for use only by fully certified members in good standing. The designations are recognized across Canada by many employers and other engineering professionals through the efforts of provincial associations of engineering technology.

Until 2010, AETTNL was a member of the Canadian Council of Technicians and Technologists (CCTT). Through CCTT being a signatory, The association recognizes international transferability through the Sydney Accord, the Dublin Accord and the Engineering Technology Mobility Forum, which confers the ability to award the designation IntET(Canada) for Technologists who wish to work internationally. In 2010, a number of different provincial associations of engineering technology left CCTT. Unlike the other associations, AETTNL has not joined Technology Professionals Canada.

The professional technologist designation in Newfoundland is not the same as the professional technologist designation in Alberta and British Columbia. The P. Tech designation in Newfoundland is equivalent to a certified engineering technologist (C.E.T.) designation in many other provinces.

The Association of Engineering Technicians and Technologists of Newfoundland and Labrador, under the name Association of Engineering Technicians and Technologists of Newfoundland (AETTN), was established in 1968.

Unlike every other association or society of engineering technicians and technology in Canada, AETTNL operates as a corporation. Rather than having a specific act of parliament in effect to empower the association to regulate their certifications, they rely on the CCTT's ownership of copyrights to different certifications. They have used that flexibility to give their members a different title.

Certified engineering technologists are bound by a specific code of ethics and rules of professional conduct.

== See also ==
- Engineering technologist
- Engineering Technology
