= Engineering Technologist Mobility Forum =

The Engineering Technologist Mobility Forum is an international forum held by signatories of the Sydney Accord to explore mutual recognition for experienced engineering technologists and to remove artificial barriers to the free movement and practice of engineering technologists amongst their countries. Signatories met in Sydney in November 1999 and Thornybush South Africa in June 2001. At their meeting on 25 June 2001, the Sydney Accord signatories established a forum, to be known as the Engineering Technologists Mobility Forum (ETMF).

== Results ==
From these meetings an agreement was reached known as the Engineering Technologist Mobility Forum Memorandum of Understanding (ETMF MOU). The agreement provides a framework for members to recognise the equivalence in professional competence and standing of experienced engineering technologists.

The signatories also agreed to create and maintain a decentralised ETMF International Register of Engineering Technologists.

== Members ==
- Canada - Represented by Canadian Council of Technicians and Technologists (2001)
- Hong Kong China - Represented by Hong Kong Institution of Engineers (2001)
- Ireland - Represented by Engineers Ireland (2001)
- New Zealand - Represented by Institution of Professional Engineers New Zealand (2001)
- South Africa - Represented by Engineering Council of South Africa (2001)
- United Kingdom - Represented by Engineering Council UK (2001)

== See also ==
- Washington Accord
- Dublin Accord
- Sydney Accord
- Certified engineering technologist
