= NBSCETT =

Organization of Canada

New Brunswick Society of Certified Engineering Technicians and Technologists
- Founded: 1968
- Purpose: Certification of engineering technicians and technologists
- Location: New Brunswick, Canada
- Origins: Trade name of Association of Certified Engineering Technicians and Technologists of New Brunswick
- Region served: New Brunswick
- Method: National Technology Benchmarks
- Website: nbscett.nb.ca

The New Brunswick Society of Certified Engineering Technicians and Technologists (NBSCETT) is New Brunswick's independent certifying body for engineering/applied science technicians and technologists. NBSCETT was established in 1968.

It confers the designations "C.Tech" and "P. Tech" which are symbols of achievement in engineering/applied science technology and are legally protected for use only by fully certified members. The designations are recognized across Canada by many employers and other engineering professionals through the efforts of provincial associations that make up the Canadian Council of Technicians and Technologists (CCTT). Though CCTT being a signatory, NBSCETT recognizes international transfer-ability through the Sydney Accord, the Dublin Accord and the Engineering Technologist Mobility Forum, which confers the ability to award the designation IntET (Canada) for Technologists who wish to work internationally.

== See also ==
- Engineering technologist
- Engineering technician
