= Professional degree =

Academic degree for qualification to work in a specific profession

A professional degree, formerly known in the US as a first professional degree, is a degree that prepares someone to work in a particular profession, practice, or industry sector often meeting the academic requirements for licensure or accreditation. Professional degrees may be either graduate or undergraduate entry, depending on the profession concerned and the country, and may be classified as bachelor's, master's, or doctoral degrees. For a variety of reasons, professional degrees may bear the name of a different level of qualification from their classification in qualifications, e.g., some UK professional degrees are named bachelor's but are at master's level, while some Australian and Canadian professional degrees have the name "doctor" but are classified as master's or bachelor's degrees.

== History ==
=== Europe ===
The first doctorates were awarded in the mid twelfth century to recognise teachers (doctors) in mediaeval universities, either in civil law at the University of Bologna or in theology at the University of Paris. These were followed shortly afterwards by doctorates in canon law, and then in the thirteenth century by doctorates in medicine, grammar, logic and philosophy. These mediaeval doctorates remained, however, essentially teaching qualifications, with their major importance being the ius ubique docendi – the right to teach anywhere.

==== United Kingdom ====
The first university medical school to be established in the United Kingdom was at the University of Edinburgh in 1726, followed in 1744 by the University of Glasgow. In 1817, Glasgow became the first British university to offer a separate degree in surgery, the Master of Surgery. However, other Scottish universities – St Andrews and the two universities in Aberdeen – also offered medical degrees, often in absentia and without examination, despite not having medical schools. In England, the two universities (Oxford and Cambridge) were only sporadically interested in medical teaching, which was mainly carried out in the London hospitals. It was not until the establishment of the University of London in 1836, however, that students at the hospital medical schools could earn degrees. Following the passing of the Medical Act 1858 and the establishment of the General Medical Council, Scottish graduates gained the right to practice in England and degrees in both medicine and surgery became the norm. The Scottish practice of awarding the Doctor of Medicine (M.D.) as a first degree was abolished by the university commissioners appointed under the Universities (Scotland) Act 1858, it being replaced by the Bachelor of Medicine and Master of Surgery (MS), with the MD becoming a higher degree as in England. The commissioners under the Universities (Scotland) Act 1889 completed the reform by replacing the MS with the Bachelor of Surgery, the MS joining the MD as a higher degree and the initial professional qualification taking on its modern form as the double Bachelor of Medicine, Bachelor of Surgery, degree.

The first university in England to offer training in theology for those intending to become priests in the Church of England was the University of Durham in 1833, following the lead of colleges such as St Bees Theological College and St David's College, Lampeter. The Licence in Theology could be taken as either a one year graduate course, following on from a BA, or a three-year undergraduate course. Shortly after, in 1837, Durham also became the first British university to teach engineering (although the course closed after a few years), followed only a few months later by King's College London.

Anglican theological colleges partnered with local universities to offer professional degrees in theology and ministry during the twentieth century. Since 2014, however, the Common Award degrees, validated by Durham, have offered a more unified training across the theological colleges. Some colleges continue to offer other degrees in addition to the Common Awards, such as the Cambridge Bachelor of Theology at the Cambridge Theological Federation

Legal studies in England were mainly confined to the Inns of Court until the late nineteenth century. The only undergraduate course was at Cambridge and concentrated on Roman civil law rather than English common law; in terms of employment, that the bishops accepted it as equivalent to a B.A. for ordination was more useful than the legal training it provided, and it was generally seen as an easy option for those who couldn't cope with the mathematics on the B.A. course. Cambridge reformed its course in 1858, and London established an undergraduate course a few years later. However, it has only been since the 1960s that law schools have taken on a leading role in training lawyers and truly established professional degrees.

In the latter part of the twentieth century, many chartered bodies introduced educational requirements for their chartered professional statuses, most notably the Engineering Council requirements for Chartered Engineer. This led to the accreditation of degrees by the relevant professional bodies and, in the case of engineering, to the Washington Accord – an international agreement between engineering regulatory bodies to recognise professional degrees accredited in each country – signed originally in 1989 by the UK, US, Australia, Canada, Ireland and New Zealand, and since expanded to include many other countries. In the twenty-first century, the standard professional degree for many science and engineering fields was raised from bachelor's to master's level, including for qualification as a Chartered Physicist (from 2001), Chartered Scientist (from 2004) and Chartered Engineer (from 2012).

=== United States ===
The Bachelor of Medicine, or M.B., was the first medical degree to be granted in the United States and Canada. The first medical schools that granted the M.B. degree were at the University of Pennsylvania and Columbia University. Columbia University was the first American university to grant the M.D. degree in 1770, although, as in England, this followed the M.B. (which was the qualifying degree) and required completion of a thesis. Professional societies started licensing doctors from the 1760s, and in the early nineteenth century started setting up their own medical schools, known as proprietary medical colleges, the first being the medical college of the Medical Society of the County of New York, which opened March 12, 1807. These eliminated the general education and long lecture terms of the university schools, making them much more popular. Without effective regulation, abuses arose, and national conventions in 1846 and 1847 led to the establishment of the American Medical Association. This new body set the first nationwide standards for M.D. degrees, requiring that students had a liberal education in arts and sciences as part of their degree, that they had served an apprenticeship before starting the course, and that the course lasted three years.

The M.D. was thus the first entry-level professional degree to be awarded as a purely trade school "doctor" degree in the United States, before the first European-style doctorate, the Ph.D., was awarded by an American institution in 1861, although the M.D. was not established as a post-baccalaureate degree until much later. The President of Yale, Arthur Twining Hadley, stated in the early 20th century that: "However convenient it might be to insist on the possession of a bachelor's degree by all pupils in the schools of law or medicine, I feel that it would be a violation of our duty to these professions to hedge ourselves about by any such artificial limitations." This changed (for medicine) after Abraham Flexner's damning report into the state of medical education in 1910: by 1930 almost all medical schools required a previous liberal arts degree before starting the M.D. course.

Law degrees were introduced in the US by the College of William & Mary in 1792, with its "Batchellor of Law" (sic) (L.B.) degree. This was followed by the "Graduate of Law" at the University of Virginia in 1829, which became the first American LL.B. in 1840. The J.D. was introduced by the University of Chicago in 1902, with the same curriculum as the LL.B. but requiring a previous B.A. or B.S. for entry. The J.D. spread, but encountered opposition, and Harvard, which imposed graduate entry as a requirement for its LL.B. course in 1909, and Yale used the name for their post-LL.B. degree, elsewhere called the LL.M. By the 1930s, when most law schools had shifted to graduate entry, the standard degree was once again the LL.B. The second shift to the J.D., again without a change of curriculum, came in the 1960s, with all American Bar Association–accredited professional degrees adopting the nomenclature by 1971.

In the late twentieth and early twenty-first century, other professions, particularly in clinical fields, transitioned their professional degrees to doctorates, following the example of the M.D. and J.D. The Master of Public Health (M.P.H. degree) and the Doctor of Public Health (Dr.P.H.) are multi-disciplinary professional degrees awarded for studies in areas related to public health. The M.P.H. degree focuses on public health practice, as opposed to research or teaching. In the 1990s there was also some debate in the architectural community about renaming the professional degree in architecture a "doctorate". The spread of professional doctorates raised concerns about the standards of the new degrees, particularly in cases such as physical therapy, where the standard set by the American Physical Therapy Association for the doctorate is the same as that for the master's degree. Critics have claimed that these degrees should not be called doctorates, pointing out that a Ph.D. takes an average of twelve years from the start of college, compared to five and a half to eight years for professional doctorates, while defenders of the new professional doctorates have said the point of comparison should be the M.D. and J.D., not the Ph.D.

== By country ==
=== United States ===
Among the professional degrees in the United States, one particular form was the graduate-entry first-professional degree, often denominated as a doctorate. The US Department of Education defined these as: "A first-professional degree was an award that required completion of a program that met all of the following criteria: (1) completion of the academic requirements to begin practice in the profession; (2) at least two years of college work before entering the program; and (3) a total of at least six academic years of college work to complete the degree program, including prior required college work plus the length of the professional program itself." The use of the term "first-professional" was discontinued by the Department of Education as of 2010–11, when new post-baccalaureate award categories were introduced. Before this, first-professional degrees (so defined) were awarded in the following ten fields:

- Chiropractic (D.C. or D.C.M.)
- Dentistry (D.D.S. or D.M.D.)
- Law (LL.B. or J.D.)
- Medicine (M.D.)
- Optometry (O.D.)
- Osteopathic medicine (D.O.)
- Pharmacy (Pharm.D.)
- Podiatry (Pod.D. or D.P.) or Podiatric medicine (D.P.M.)
- Theology (M. Div., M.H.L., B.D., or Ord. and M.H.L./Rav.)
- Veterinary medicine (D.V.M.)

Since 2011, the classification "doctor's degree - professional practice" has been used for "[a] doctor's degree that is conferred upon completion of a program providing the knowledge and skills for the recognition, credential, or license required for professional practice." As with the "first professional degree", this classification also requires that the total time in higher education is at least six years. However, the requirement for at least two years of college-level study before entering the program was removed. The Department of Education does not define which fields professional doctorates may be awarded in, unlike with the "first professional degree". Besides professional doctorates, other professional degrees can exist that use the title of bachelor or master, such as the degrees of Bachelor of Architecture and Master of Architecture in the field of architecture. In particular, first professional degrees in theology, which did not use the title of doctor, were reclassified as master's degrees in 2011 — including the degree of Bachelor of Divinity.

A distinction is drawn in the United States between professional doctorates and "doctor's degree - research/scholarship", with the latter being "[a] Ph.D. or other doctor's degree that requires advanced work beyond the master's level, including the preparation and defense of a dissertation based on original research, or the planning and execution of an original project demonstrating substantial artistic or scholarly achievement." Internationally, United States professional doctorates (which, unlike research doctorates, are not defined as requiring work beyond the master's level) are not generally considered to be doctoral level qualifications. The classification of "Doctor's degree - other" also exists for doctorates that do not meet the definition of either professional doctorates or research doctorates.

The United States Census Bureau uses the classification "professional degree beyond bachelor's degree" as one of the possible answers to "What is the highest degree or level of school this person has completed?" in the American Community Survey, with examples of Doctor of Medicine, Doctor of Dental Surgery, Doctor of Veterinary Medicine, Bachelor of Laws, and Juris Doctor. This sits between "master's degree" and "doctorate degree" (with the examples for a doctorate being Doctor of Philosophy and Doctor of Education).

Some fields offer degrees beyond the professional doctorate or other degrees required for qualification, sometimes termed post-professional degrees. Higher professional degrees may also be offered in fields that do not have specific academic requirements for entry, such as Fine Arts. These degrees may be at master's or doctorate levels.

=== Canada ===
Professional degrees are considered undergraduate degrees in Canada and are recognized by Statistics Canada as degrees that lead to entry-to-practice professions. They generally require an undergraduate degree prior to admission; however, some professional degrees may be direct entry after secondary schooling, such as social work, nursing, midwifery, and education. Professional degrees are considered competitive for entry with academic rigor.

- Medicine (M.D.)
- Optometry (O.D.)
- Pharmacy (Pharm.D.) or (BPharm)
- Dentistry (D.D.S.) or (D.M.D.)
- Chiropody/Podiatry (D.Ch) or Podiatric medicine (D.P.M.)
- Veterinary medicine (D.V.M.)
- Law (J.D) or (LL.B.) or (B.C.L.)
- Midwifery (B.H.Sc.)
- Nursing (B.Sc.N.) or (B.N.)
- Social Work (B.S.W.)
- Education (B.Ed.)
- Engineering (B.Eng) or (B.A.Sc.)
- Psychology (D.Psy.)

=== United Kingdom ===
Professional degrees in the UK are accredited by professional, statutory and regulatory bodies, which work with the Quality Assurance Agency on defining benchmark statements for their subjects. Specific benchmark statements have also been produced for professional qualifications in Scotland.

Many professional degrees span teaching at bachelor's and master's level, leading to a master's level award:

This includes older degrees that retain the names of bachelor's degrees for historic reasons, e.g., the Bachelor of Medicine, Bachelor of Surgery (M.B.B.S.; M.B., Ch.B.; etc.), Bachelor of Dental Surgery (B.D.S.), and Bachelor of Veterinary Science (B.V.S.), and newer integrated master's degrees such as the Master of Engineering (M.Eng.), Master of Optometry (M.Optom), or Master of Pharmacy (M.Pharm.). In some subjects, qualification can be via separate bachelor's and master's degrees, e.g., a Bachelor of Engineering (B.Eng.) followed by a Master of Science (M.Sc.) in Engineering, or a Bachelor of Arts (B.A.) or Bachelor of Science (B.Sc.) in Architecture followed by a year of professional experience, then a two-year Master of Architecture (M.Arch.). In some subjects the normal professional degree is a bachelor's degree, e.g., the Bachelor of Laws (LL.B.) or B.A. in Law (for both solicitors and barristers) or a B.Sc. in Surveying. or a B.Sc. in Accountancy. Some professional bodies also offer different levels of professional recognition, e.g., a master's degree is needed for Chartered Engineers or Chartered Scientists but a bachelor's degree for Incorporated Engineers and a bachelor's or foundation degree for Registered Scientists.

It is common for professional qualification in the UK to require professional experience in addition to academic qualification. For Architecture, the standard route has a year of experience between the bachelor's and master's stages and a further year after the master's before the final examination; becoming a Chartered Engineer requires post-degree Initial Professional Development that typically takes four to six years; becoming a General Practitioner requires five years of study beyond the M.B.B.S., while qualifying as a Consultant takes seven to nine more years. Although initial registration as a medical doctor occurs after the initial four-to-six-year primary medical qualification (e.g., M.B.B.S.).

In addition to initial professional degrees, some professional master's degrees and most professional doctorates, e.g., the Master of Business Administration (M.B.A.), Doctor of Education (Ed.D.), Doctor of Engineering (Eng.D.) and Doctor of Agriculture (D.Ag.), are offered for those already established in professions. UK professional doctorates are research degrees at the same level as Ph.D.'s, normally including teaching at doctoral level but still assessed by a doctoral research thesis or equivalent.

Some professional degrees are designed specifically for trainees or members within a particular organisation, rather than being available via general enrollment. Examples of these include the Church of England's Common Awards with Durham University and the Association of Chartered Certified Accountants' B.Sc. in Applied Accounting with Oxford Brookes University.

== International equivalence ==
=== In medicine ===
In medicine, individual countries specify rules for recognising foreign qualifications; in the US, for example, this is carried out by the Educational Commission for Foreign Medical Graduates (ECFMG) and in the UK by the General Medical Council (GMC). The Australian Medical Council, US ECFMG, UK GMC, Medical Council of Canada, Danish Health and Medicines Authority, and Korean Institute of Medical Education and Evaluation jointly sponsor the World Directory of Medical Schools. At least one state in the US, Wisconsin, permits foreign graduates to use the title "MD" if licensed to practice in the US. The state of New York grants an M.D. degree to graduates of approved foreign medical schools upon application and payment of a fee.

=== In engineering ===
In engineering, the Washington Accord (1989) recognised that the academic training (i.e., professional degrees) for full professional status (Professional Engineer, Chartered Engineer, European Engineer, etc.) is equivalent in the signatory countries. Similarly the Sydney Accord (2001) recognises similar academic training between signatories for Engineering Technologists, Incorporated Engineers, etc. and the Dublin Accord (2002) for Engineering Technicians. For computing and information technology, the Seoul Accord (2008) recognises similar academic training on accredited courses for computing and information technology professionals in the signatory countries.

== See also ==
- Licensure
- Postgraduate education
- Professional certification
- Terminal degree
