= Ontario Association of Certified Engineering Technicians and Technologists =

- Abbreviation: OACETT
- Founded: 1962; 64 years ago
- Purpose: Certification of engineering technicians and technologists
- Headquarters: 10 Four Seasons Place, Suite 700, Toronto Ontario, Canada
- Region served: Ontario
- Method: National Technology Benchmarks
- Members: 20,300 (2025)
- Key people: Board of Directors
- Affiliations: Technology Professionals Canada
- Website: oacett.org

The Ontario Association of Certified Engineering Technicians and Technologists, or OACETT, is a not-for-profit, self-governing organization in Ontario, Canada. It is a professional association that promotes the interests of engineering and applied science technicians and technologists to industry, educational institutions, government and the public. It currently has 24,000+ members.

== History ==
The OACETT logo celebrating their 50th anniversary

In 1956, a certification program for technicians and technologists was started by the Association of Professional Engineers of Ontario (APEO), now known as Professional Engineers Ontario (PEO). The first certifications were granted on June 5, 1957.

OACETT was incorporated in 1962 by the APEO. APEO reserved the post-nominal "CET" under the federal Trademarks Act, and later transferred ownership to OACETT.

OACETT played a role in the 1973 formation of the Canadian Council of Technicians and Technologists (CCTT), a federal parent organization with which OACETT was affiliated.

By 1977, OACETT's Bylaw 15 had adequately established its own registration board separate from the APEO, asserting its independence.

In 1984, the Legislative Assembly of Ontario granted OACETT self-governing status, with Royal Assent of the OACETT Act, Statutes of Ontario. The act recognized OACETT as a professional body whose main objective is to establish and maintain high standards for the engineering and applied science technician and technologist professions. The Association's disciplinary and registration tribunals became formalized and subject to the Statutory Powers Procedure Act and Judicial Review Procedure Act, with their decisions appealable to the Divisional Court of the Superior Court of Ontario. These statutes reserved titles and their respective post-nominals, making their use by non-members unlawful under the Provincial Offences Act and triable by the Ontario Court of Justice.

In 1998, a revised version of the OACETT act was passed by the Ontario Legislature.

In 2006, like other self-governing and self-regulating professional bodies in Ontario, OACETT's registration and admissions procedures became subject to the Fair Access to the Regulated Professions Act.

In 2010, OACETT withdrew from CCTT and no longer has an affiliation. They are now affiliated with Technology Professionals Canada, an organization they helped found.

== Certification ==
The Institute of Engineering Technology of Ontario (IETO) is the section of OACETT responsible for certification. It includes a panel of professional members that evaluates applications for certification and registers engineering and applied science technicians and technologists who meet established Canadian standards in education and experience.

OACETT confers the post-nominal designations of C.Tech. (certified technician), C.E.T. (certified engineering technologist), and A.Sc.T. (applied science technologist). These titles and their respective post-nominal abbreviations are legally protected under the OACETT Act for use only by certified members, in the same manner that the PEO protects the use of the P.Eng. (professional engineer) designation.

The 1995 agreement on internal trade (amended since), agreed upon by all provinces except Nunavut, lays out the general principles of transferability of professional certifications between provinces. Specifically, chapter 7 spells out the principles of professional certification Certifications from any province can be transferred to another province by filling out an inter-provincial transfer form.

Unlike the Red Seal Journeyman certification, which is automatically and freely recognized in all provinces and territories, Membership in one provincial organization does not automatically and freely provide the ability to use the C.E.T. designation in all provinces. For example, in the province of Ontario, being a member of the Certified Engineering Technicians and Technologists Association of Manitoba does not provide the ability to use the C.E.T. title in Ontario. The options available are to either transfer their membership to OACETT, or to maintain a membership in both provinces.

MTO (Ministry of Transportation Ontario) Designations issued by OACETT include:

- RCJI - Road Construction Junior Inspector;
- RCSI - Road Construction Senior Inspector; and
- RCCA - Road Construction Contract Administrator.

== Governance and operation ==
Although OACETT interacts closely with the provincial and federal governments, it is not a governmental organization, and receives no governmental funding. OACETT's activities are primarily funded by annual membership dues.

The association's affairs are governed by an elected council of technician and technologist members. Much of the association's operation is aided by volunteer members.

== Master electrician license ==
Certified engineering technologists and technicians are one of the four classes of certified professional who meet the requirements to write the master electrician exam; The other classes are journeyman electricians, professional engineers, and journeyman power line technicians.

This is provided for under the Electricity Act, 1998, of Ontario.

== Well technician license ==
Engineering technologists and technicians who are registered as technicians and technologists in training with OACETT are subject to a dramatically reduced requirement for licensing.

This is provided for under the Ontario Water Resources Act R.R.O. 1990

== Aggregate resources ==
Certified engineering technologists and technicians may apply for qualified person status with the Ministry of Natural Resources. This allows them to receive approval to prepare Class 'A' site plans.

== Pre-start & safety reviews ==
The Ministry of Labour's Occupational Health & Safety Act – Section 7 – requires a pre-start health and safety review (PSR) to be completed. A report must be prepared by a "qualified reviewer". C.E.T.s, A.Sc.T.s and C.Tech.s with competent technical knowledge, may qualify as a “qualified reviewer” under item 8 which covers, "process uses or produces a toxic substance that may result in exposure above the occupational exposure limits".

== Designer qualification and registration ==
The Ministry of Municipal Affairs and Housing considers an OACETT member who is employed as a designer, who has passed the ministry's exam, and has a Building Code Identification Number can do the design on a house and other structures within their qualification, usually up to 600 square metres and three storeys.

== Arms ==
Coat of arms of Ontario Association of Certified Engineering Technicians and Technologists

Notes
Granted 23 September 1992
Crest
Issuant from a coronet composed of four maple leaves Gules set on a rim Or a pellet edged by a steel gear wheel Proper charged with an arm in pale Proper the hand grasping three lightning flashes one in pale and two in saltire Or.
Escutcheon
Gules on a chevron Or a pair of calipers Sable in chief two trillium flowers and in base an open book proper bound Or.
Supporters
On a grassy mound dexter a representation of the God Haephaestus holding in the dexter hand a forge hammer and sinister a representation of the Goddess Athena holding in the sinister hand a spear paleways all Proper.
