= Association of Science and Engineering Technology Professionals of Alberta =

Canadian professional association

- Formation: August 1, 1963; 62 years ago
- Type: Professional association
- Region served: Alberta
- Website: aset.ab.ca

The Association of Science and Engineering Technology Professionals of Alberta (ASET), is a professional association located in Alberta, Canada. The organization represents applied science and engineering technology professionals in industry, educational institutions, the public and the government. ASET also evaluates the qualifications of individuals who voluntarily apply for certification and issues professional credentials accordingly. It also delivers a number of benefits and services to its members and their employers.

== History ==
On August 1, 1963, with the sponsorship of the Association of Professional Engineers, Geologists and Geophysicists of Alberta (APEGGA), the Alberta Society of Engineering Technicians was incorporated. In 1966, the name was adjusted to the Alberta Society of Engineering Technologists. Then, in 2005, the name was updated to properly reflect the broad range of disciplines in which ASET certifies, thus becoming the Association of Science and Engineering Technology Professionals of Alberta, while the established acronym ASET was retained.

== Governance and operation ==
Although ASET interacts closely with the provincial and federal governments, it is not a governmental organization and receives no governmental funding. ASET's activities are primarily funded by annual membership dues. The association's affairs are governed by an elected council of technician and technologist members. Much of the association's operation is aided by volunteer members. A paid, administrative staff operates out of the ASET office in Edmonton, including the Executive Director who liaises with the council.

=== National association ===
Each of the 10 Canadian Provinces has a society similar in nature to ASET. In 1970, a coordinating body representing engineering and applied science technicians and technologists in Canada was formed, known as the Canadian Council of Technicians and Technologists (CCTT). Provincial societies appoint directors to CCTT for its governance. ASET has withdrawn from CCTT as of summer 2010. Since then, it has joined Technology Professionals Canada, which is not a signatory of the Sydney or Dublin Accords.

== Certification ==
ASET includes a panel of professional members that evaluates applications for certification and registers engineering and applied science technicians and technologists who meet established Canadian standards in education and experience.

=== Designations ===
ASET confers the following post-nominal designations:

- C.Tech. (certified technician)
- C.E.T. (certified engineering technologist)
- P.Tech. (professional technologist) – Members who earn this designation have the right to practice engineering independently in accordance with established methodologies and specifications including existing codes and regulations. With this right, a member is able to sign off and stamp their own work.

Other types of ASET membership include:

- Student – enrolled in the final half of a recognized Alberta technical institute or college training program that will lead to eventual professional certification in one of the applied science, information or engineering technologies.
- T.T. (technician/technologist in training) – open to any person who resides in the province of Alberta or the Canadian Territories and who graduated from a Canadian institute of technology or college whose course content is approved as being satisfactory for certification as a technician or technologist, but who has not completed the full two years' related work experience requirement.
- R.E.T. (registered engineering technologist) – a senior designation still recognized in Alberta, but no longer offered

The above symbols are legally protected for use only by certified members.

ASET has issued other designations in the past, which are no longer issued in Alberta:

- A.Sc.T. (applied science technologist)
- C.C.I.T. (certified computer information technologist)

ASET members who earned these designations previously were instead assigned C.E.T.

The designations conferred by ASET are recognized across Canada by provincial member organizations of Technology Professionals of Canada (TPC) and CCTT.
