= Institution of Engineers of Ireland =

Engineering organization of Ireland

Engineers Ireland Cumann na nInnealtóirí
- Founded: 1835 as the Civil Engineers Society of Ireland
- Type: Engineering society Learned society Professional body
- Purpose: "The professional body for engineers and engineering in Ireland."
- Headquarters: 22 Clyde Road, Ballsbridge, Dublin 4, Ireland
- Origins: By amalgamation of Cumann na nInnealtóirí into the Institution of Civil Engineers of Ireland
- Region served: Ireland (primarily)
- Members: circa 30,000+ (2025)
- Key people: Laura Burke – President; Damien Owens – Director General
- Website: www.engineersireland.ie

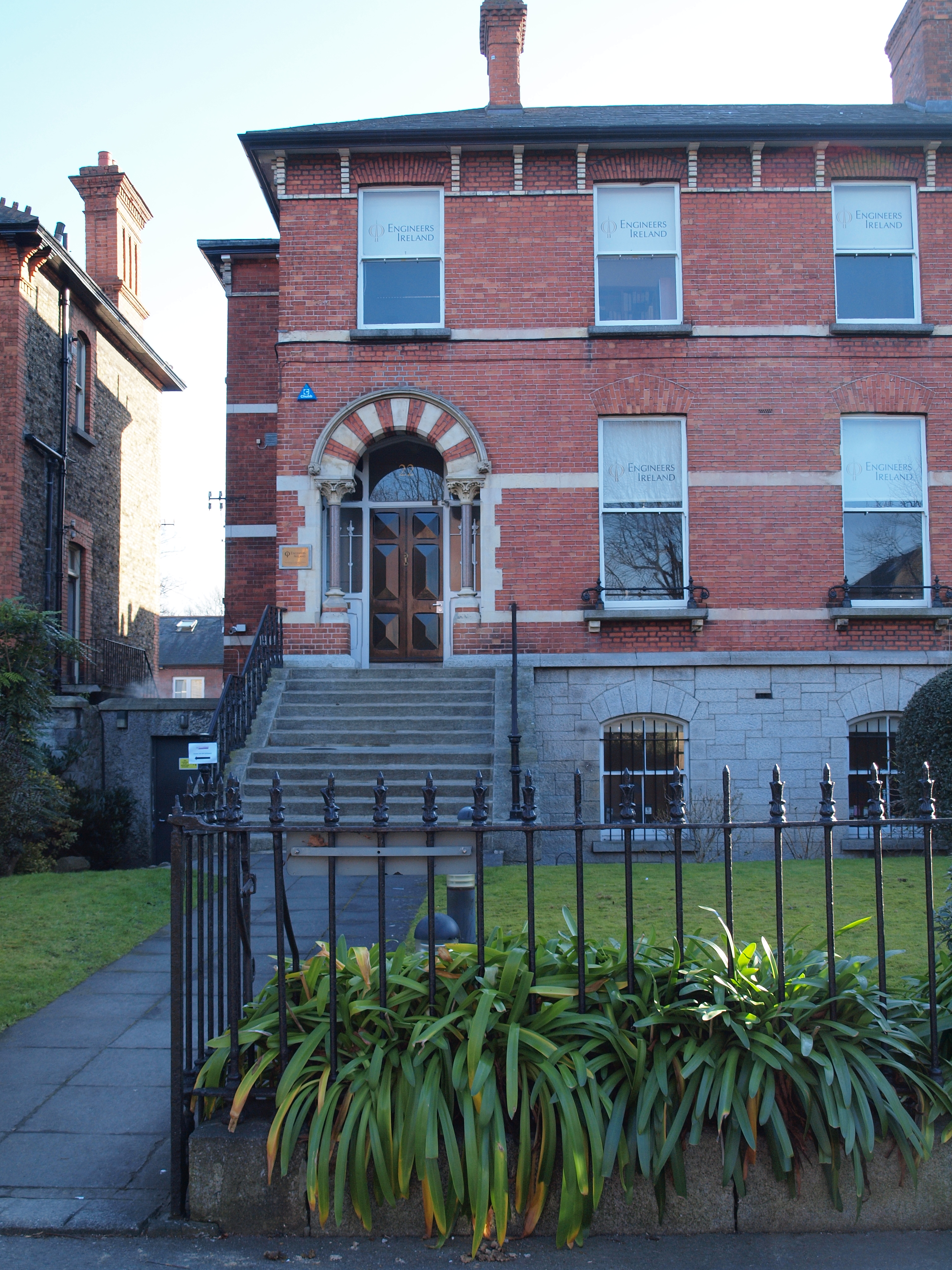
At the headquarters of Engineers Ireland, 22 Clyde Road, Dublin 4

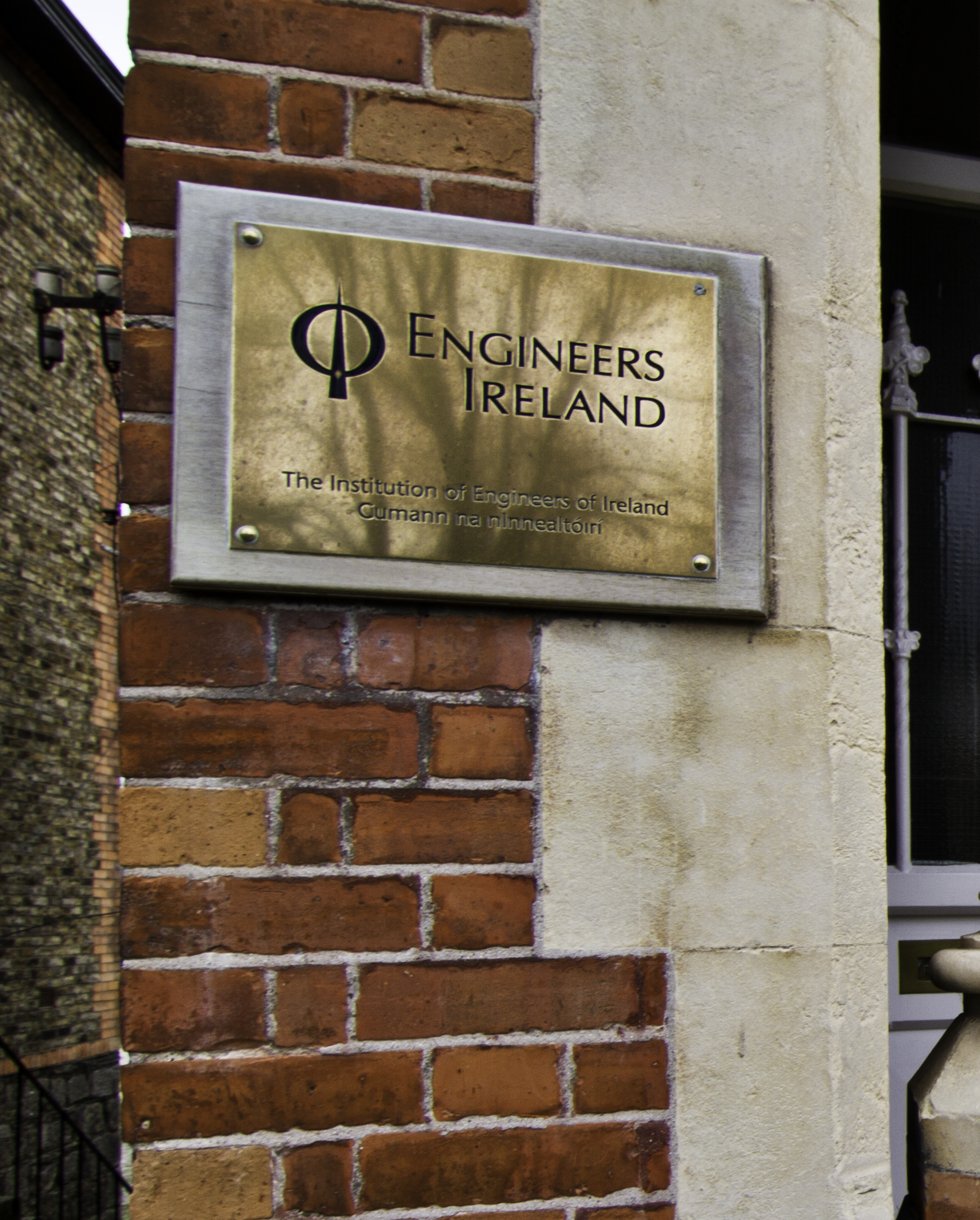
Engineers Ireland Headquarters at 22 Clyde Road, Ballsbridge, Dublin 4

The Institution of Engineers of Ireland (Irish: Cumann na nInnealtóirí) or the IEI, is an engineering society primarily representing members based in Ireland. The institution is Ireland’s recognised organisation for accreditation of professional engineering qualifications under the Washington Accord, Sydney Accord, and Dublin Accord. As such, it is the regulatory authority for the engineering profession in Ireland and is responsible for the registration of Chartered Engineers, Associate Engineers, and Engineering Technicians.

Membership of the institution is open to individuals based on academic and professional background and is separated into grades in accordance with criteria. The institution received its current legal name in 1969 by an Act of the Oireachtas. In October 2005 the institution adopted the operating name Engineers Ireland; the legal name is, however, unchanged.

== History ==
1999: former logo incorporated phi, the 21st Greek alphabet letter.

The history of the institution can be traced to 6 August 1835 when civil engineers met in Dublin; the result was the Civil Engineers Society of Ireland, in 1844 the society adopted the name the Institution of Civil Engineers of Ireland (ICEI). The institution received a royal charter on 15 October 1877, this being a significant milestone in obtaining international recognition and standing. In the early years of the Irish Free State Cumann na nInnealtóirí (The Engineers Association) was set up independently, in 1928, by incorporation under the Companies Act, 1908 to "improve and advance the status and remuneration of qualified members of the engineering profession" as it was felt that the ICEI's charter prevented its negotiation of employment conditions and salary.

In 1927 the ICEI elected their first woman member when Iris Cummins was admitted to the organisation.

As time progressed it was realised that the institution and association might better advance engineering in Ireland by amalgamation of both into a single organisation which would represent a broader set of engineering disciplines, so discussions commenced in 1965, and resulted in The Institution of Civil Engineers of Ireland (Charter Amendment) Act, 1969 leading to the redesignation of the unified institution as The Institution of Engineers of Ireland – Cumann na nInnealtóirí. Since this Act the institution has represented all branches of engineering in Ireland.

In 1997 the institution set up the Irish Academy of Engineering – official website, based at Bolton Street, Dublin Institute of Technology (Now Technological University Dublin).

== Mission ==
"The institution promotes the art and science of engineering...", in particular:

"Our members serve society through the highest standards of professional engineering. We seek to improve the quality of life for all, creating prosperity and adding value through innovation and the promotion of health, and sustainable development."

== Responsibilities ==
- Promote knowledge of engineering.
- Establish and maintain standards of professional engineering and engineering education.
- Provide opportunities for Continuing Professional Development (CPD) for engineers.
- Maintain standards of professional ethics and conduct.
- Ensure that professional titles are granted to qualified candidates.
- Act as the authoritative voice of the engineering profession in Ireland.

== Professional Titles ==
- Honorary Fellow of Engineers Ireland – FIEI (Hons)
- Fellow of Engineers Ireland – CEng FIEI or CEng CEnv FIEI
- Chartered Environmentalist – CEng CEnv MIEI
- Chartered Engineer – CEng MIEI
- Associate Engineer – AEng MIEI
- Engineering Technician – Eng Tech MIEI
- Member of Engineers Ireland – MIEI
- Technician Member of Engineers Ireland – Tech IEI
- European Engineer – EUR ING

Other Membership Titles

- Student Member of Engineers Ireland
- Affiliate Member of Engineers Ireland
- Companion Member of Engineers Ireland

== Sectors ==
The institution is divided into three sectors; Divisions, Regions, and Societies, which are further subdivided – their purpose is to promote engineering and share knowledge.

- Regions: An Ríocht (Kerry); Australia/New Zealand; Cork; Donegal; GB; Midland; North-East; Northern; North-West; South-East; Thomond and West.
- Divisions: Agriculture and Food; Biomedical; Chemical and Process; Civil; Electronic and Computing; Electrical; Energy, Environment and Climate Action; Fire and Safety; Public Sector; Mechanical and Manufacturing; Structures and Construction.
- Societies: Academic; An Roth; Geotechnical; Heritage; MEETA Asset Management; Project Management; Transportation; Water and Environmental; Young Engineers Society (Y.E.S); Inclusion and Diversity; Executive and Business; Women in Engineering Group.

== International ==
In accordance with EU requirements it is the designated authority for the engineering profession in Ireland. The institution is a national member of European Federation of National Engineering Associations (FEANI). The institution is also a signatory to a number of multilateral agreements, these are principally for registered professional titles and accredited engineering programmes, for academic programmes these are:

Year	Agreement	Qualification	Practitioner
1989	The Washington Accord	An accredited engineering degree	Engineer
2001	The Sydney Accord	National Diploma in Engineering	Technologist
2002	The Dublin Accord	National Certificate in Engineering	Technician

The institution is also the signatory to a number of bilateral agreements with engineering societies in the United Kingdom. These are for the dual recognition of corresponding Chartered Engineer, Associate Engineer and Engineering Technician grades of the institution.

== What the Institution offers ==
Free CPD Series and Sector webinars; Awarding Registered Professional Titles; Continuing Professional Development (CPD); International Recognition of your Qualifications; Advocating on behalf of Members and the Profession; Supporting Career Progression; Online Resources/Communications

== See also ==
- Education in the Republic of Ireland
- List of Irish learned societies
- List of universities in the Republic of Ireland
