= Order of Professional Technologists of Quebec =

Organization of Quebec, Canada

The Ordre des technologues professionnels du Québec is Quebec's independent certifying body for engineering/applied science technicians and technologists.

Ordre des technologues professionnels du Québec is a constituent member of the Canadian Council of Technicians and Technologists, and as such recognizes international transferability through the Sydney Accord, the Dublin Accord and the Engineering Technology Mobility Forum, which confers the ability to award the designation IntET(Canada) for Technologists who wish to work internationally.

Certification in Quebec is called "professional technologist", or "technologue professionnel" status. Unlike Alberta's Professional Technologist (Engineering) designation, which is a limited license to practice professional engineering within a limited scope, Quebec's professional technologist designation is equivalent to a certified engineering technologist designation and thus is not a license to practice professional engineering.

Members are governed by the "Code des professions du Québec" and the "Code de déontologie des technologues professionnels", and perform according to accepted norms and standards in the industry.
