= Applied Science Technologists and Technicians of British Columbia =

Organization of Canada

The Applied Science Technologists and Technicians of British Columbia
- Founded: 1958
- Purpose: Certification of engineering technicians and technologists
- Location: 10767 - 148th Street, Surrey, British Columbia V3R 0S4
- Region served: British Columbia
- Method: National Technology Benchmarks
- Website: www.asttbc.org

The Applied Science Technologists and Technicians of British Columbia (ASTTBC), is British Columbia's regulating body for engineering/applied science technicians and technologists in British Columbia.

ASTTBC falls under the Professional Governance Act (PGA) which oversees ASTTBC.

ASTTBC confers the post-nominal designations of CTech (Certified Technician), and AScT (Applied Science Technologist) which are symbols of achievement in engineering/applied science technology and are legally protected for use only by fully certified members in good standing. The designations are recognized across Canada by many employers and other engineering professionals through the efforts of provincial associations of engineering technology.

In April 2023 ASTTBC announced that it was in the process of eliminating the requirement for registrants to have Canadian work experience. This change was updated in the ASTTBC bylaws that were approved by the Minister in September 2023, which came just before the International Credentials Recognition Act received royal assent. The International Credentials Recognition Act is scheduled to come into effect in summer 2024.

Until 2010, ASTTBC was a member of the Canadian Council of Technicians and Technologists (CCTT). Through CCTT being a signatory, the Applied Science Technologists and Technicians of British Columbia recognizes international transferability through the Sydney Accord, the Dublin Accord and the Engineering Technology Mobility Forum, which confers the ability to award the designation IntET(Canada) for Technologists who wish to work internationally. In 2010, a number of different provincial associations of engineering technology left CCTT to found Technology Professionals Canada. In 2021 Technology Accreditation Canada began to confere international accredited diplomas, and in 2023 TPC became the recognized signatory as CCTT dissolved into TPC.

Society of Architectural and Engineering Technologists of BC, was established in 1958, making them one of the first societies of engineering technology. Today, they identify themselves with the name Applied Science Technologists and Technicians of British Columbia.

In 2001-2004 ASTTBC and APEGBC (now EGBC) attempted to merge and provide practice rights to Technicians and Technologists. This attempt made it as far as determining where staff would sit in the merged office, but ultimately failed when a new APEGBC council was elected, led by Dennis McJunkin cancelled the merger. The reasoning provided was protectionism by citing in the November 2004 "Innovation Magazine" (EGBC's trade magazine) that was "it is not in the best interests of the APEGBC membership". In the proposed merger APEGBC outlined the draft definitions for defined scopes of practice.

ASTTBC has since been establishing its right to practice, which is being advanced by the PGA.

Certified Engineering Technologists and Technicians are bound by a specific code of ethics and rules of professional conduct as outlined in their bylaws and the PGA.

== Sewage System Regulation ==
In addition to certifying applied science technologists, ASTTBC has the ability to certify courses regarding sewer systems as acceptable, and the ability to certify individuals as qualified to work on sewage systems, and for setting occupational competencies and accredited programs or courses.

These powers are granted through the Sewerage Regulation Act of British Columbia.

== Electrical Field Safety Representative Certification ==
Applied Science Technologists registered with ASTTBC in the electrical discipline and with acceptable experience are eligible to apply for certification by the British Columbia Safety Authority (BCSA) as a Field Safety Representatives (FSR).

This is provided for under the Electrical Safety Regulations of British Columbia

== License to Practice Limited Electrical Work ==
Certain ASTTBC-registered applied science technologists and certified technicians with suitable electrical experience may apply for certification and then licensing by the British Columbia Safety Authority to perform very specified electrical work within a limited scope.

== See also ==
- Engineering technologist
- Engineering Technology
- The Association of British Columbia Land Surveyors
