= Certified Technicians and Technologists Association of Manitoba =

Professional organization of Canada

- Founded: 1965
- Purpose: Certification of engineering technicians and technologists
- Location: 870 Pembina Hwy, Winnipeg, Manitoba, Canada
- Region served: Manitoba
- Method: National Technology Standards
- Members: 3300
- Key people: Bernardo Pasco, C.E.T., President, Shannon Nordal, C.E.T., Past President, Julie Schneider, C.E.T., President Elect, Robert Okabe, C.E.T., F.E.C.(Hon), CEO & Registrar
- Employees: 3
- Volunteers: 30
- Website: www.cttam.com

The Certified Technicians and Technologists Association of Manitoba (CTTAM) is a regulated profession in Manitoba responsible for certifying engineering/applied science technicians and technologists. The Certified Applied Science Technologists Act assented on June 29, 1998.

CTTAM confers the post-nominal designations of C.Tech. (certified technician), and C.E.T. (certified engineering technologist) which are symbols of achievement in engineering/applied science technology and are legally protected for use only by fully certified members in good standing. The designations are recognized across Canada by many employers and other engineering professionals through the efforts of provincial associations that make up the Technology Professionals Canada (TPC).

The Certified Technicians and Technologists Association of Manitoba, under the name Manitoba Certified Technicians and Technologists (MANCETT), was established in 1965.

Certified engineering technologists are bound by a specific code of ethics and rules of professional conduct.

The association is mandated and empowered by the Certified Applied Science Technologists Act of Manitoba

Although certification is voluntary, some employers will require it.

== M-License ==
In 2006, the legislation regarding electrical work changed. Now, all electrical workers must be licensed.

Certified members in the field of Electrical, Instrumentation, Electronic, Communication, Computer, Biomedical and Mechanical can be granted a M-license limited license to practice electrical work, once certain criteria are met.

There are 3 levels of license available: A limited construction license which can be attained after 5400 hours of documented construction work, a maintenance license which can be attained after 3600 hours of documented maintenance work, and a maintenance/builder license.

== Activism and lobbying ==
CTTAM is actively involved with lobbying for the interests of technologists in Manitoba.

CTTAM, in cooperation with the Association of consulting Engineering companies (ACEC), Engineers Geoscientists Manitoba and representatives from the insurance industry, has reduced the ultimate limitation period for civil actions in Manitoba.

CTTAM has contributed to local colleges, including Red River College Polytechnic, Assiniboine College and University College of the North.

== See also ==
- Engineering technologist
- Engineering Technology
