= Licensed engineering technologist =

A licensed engineering technologist (LET) is a class of licensee within Professional Engineers Ontario.

LET is a class of limited license authorized under the Professional Engineers Act of Ontario, which allows a holder to practice, and take responsible for the practice of engineering within a limited scope of work. A limited license may be provided in the case that a person has—through at least 13 years of specialised experience—become competent at a certain area of professional engineering. They may only practice within the scope of their license.

== See also ==
Engineering technologist
