= Technology Professionals Saskatchewan =

Organization of Canada

- Founded: 1965
- Purpose: Registration of engineering technicians and technologists
- Location(s): 381 Park Street; Regina, Saskatchewan; S4N 5B2
- Region served: Saskatchewan
- Method: Canadian Technology Standards
- Website: www.tpsk.ca
- Formerly called: Saskatchewan Applied Science Technologists & Technicians; Society of Engineering Technicians and Technologists of Saskatchewan

Technology Professionals Saskatchewan (TPS) is the only regulatory body in the Province of Saskatchewan that registers professionals in applied science and engineering technology.

TPS awards the following professional post-nominal designations of P.Tech. (Professional Technologist), and C.Tech. (Certified Technician), which are symbols of achievement in applied science and engineering technology and are legally protected for use only by fully certified members in good standing. These professional designations are recognized across Canada by provincial applied science and engineering technology regulating associations, and many employers.

The association is mandated and empowered by the "Saskatchewan Applied Science Technologists and Technicians Act".

TPS is a member of Technology Professionals Canada, which recognizes international transferability through the Sydney Accord, and the Dublin Accords.

The Society of Engineering Technicians and Technologists of Saskatchewan (SETTS), was established in 1965. It changed its name to Saskatchewan Applied Science Technologists and Technicians, and later to Technology Professionals Saskatchewan in May 2019.

Certified Applied Science Technologists are bound by a specific code of ethics and rules of professional conduct.

== See also ==
- Engineering technologist
- Engineering Technology
