= Hong Kong Institution of Engineers =

Professional organization

- Coat of Arms of The Hong Kong Institution of Engineers (beaver and dragon)
- Abbreviation: HKIE
- Formation: 1947 (Engineering Society of Hong Kong)
- Type: Professional body
- Headquarters: 1 Great George Street, Hong Kong
- Website: Official website
- Formerly called: Engineering Society of Hong Kong

Hong Kong Institution of Engineers
- Traditional Chinese: 香港工程師學會
- Simplified Chinese: 香港工程师学会
Transcriptions
Standard Mandarin
- Hanyu Pinyin: Xiānggǎng Gōngchéngshī Xuéhuì
Yue: Cantonese
- Jyutping: hoeng1 gong2 gung1 cing4 si1 hok6 wui6*2

The Hong Kong Institution of Engineers (HKIE, Chinese: 香港工程師學會) is a professional body of engineers in Hong Kong. It was founded in 1947 as the Engineering Society of Hong Kong and was incorporated by the Legislative Council of Hong Kong as The Hong Kong Institution of Engineers in 1975. The institution aims to facilitate the exchange of knowledge and ideas, train the members in new technology and practices, and to raise the standing and visibility of engineers. It has a membership of more than 30,000 under 21 different engineering disciplines.

== History ==
=== Before World War II ===
On 3 June 1882, The Hong Kong Engineers' Institute was established at Hongkong Hotel, with John Inglis as the first president. On 8 January 1891, Institution of Engineers and Shipbuilders of Hong Kong was established at 16 Praya Central, Hong Kong, and it has replaced The Hong Kong Engineers' Institute's function.

=== Post-War Period ===
John Finnie, president of Institution of Engineers and Shipbuilders of Hong Kong between 1939 and 1940 proposed to create a new engineering society focusing on training local engineers in Hong Kong. During the World War II, Finnie was imprisoned by the Japanese Army in the civilian internment camp at Stanley where he still organised talks on engineering.

The Engineering Society of Hong Kong was set up in 1947, following the efforts of John Finnie. The society was established in the Lee Gardens Hotel. In 1972 the Society was amalgamated with the Hong Kong Joint Group of the Institutions of Civil, Mechanical and Electrical Engineers of London, and transformed into The Hong Kong Institution of Engineers with both learned society and qualifying functions three years later.

=== Establishment of The Hong Kong Institution of Engineers ===
In 1975, the Legislative Council of Hong Kong passed The Hong Kong Institution of Engineers Ordinance which granted the institution statutory status.

=== Milestones ===
1947 - Founding of Engineering Society of Hong Kong

1972 - Amalgamated with the independent Hong Kong Joint Group of the Institutions of Civil, Mechanical and Electrical Engineers of London

1975 - Incorporated by Law as The Hong Kong Institution of Engineers

1982 - Recognition of the HKIE Corporate Members by the Government for Civil Service Appointments

1995 - Admitted to the Washington Accord

1997 - 50th Anniversary of the Founding of Engineering Society of Hong Kong

2001 - Admitted to the Sydney Accord and the Engineers Mobility Forum (EMF)

2003 - Admitted to the Engineering Technologists Mobility Forum (ETMF)

2005 - 30th Anniversary of the HKIE Incorporation

2007 - 60th Anniversary of the Founding of Engineering Society of Hong Kong

2009 - Admitted to the Seoul Accord

== Education and Training ==
The Hong Kong Institution of Engineers has a system to assess the standards of engineering programme in various tertiary institutions in Hong Kong to determine whether to recognise the qualifications of the programme for graduates to join the Institution. The Institution's accreditation board conducts professional assessments of Bachelor's, Associate's and Higher Diploma programmes in Engineering and Computer Science in Hong Kong and overseas universities. The Bachelor of Engineering program that meets the standards can be accredited under the "Washington Accord", and the Bachelor of Computer Science program can be accredited under the "Seoul Accord"; as for each sub-degree program that meets the academic requirements of the Institution, it can be accredited under the "Sydney Accord".

The Institution also provides Continuing Professional Development activities to engineers to increase their quality.

== Publication ==
The Hong Kong Institution of Engineers, as an academic body in the engineering field in Hong Kong, has a publication HKIE Transactions. Published quarterly since 1994, the HKIE Transactions provides a platform for engineers to discuss various aspects of engineering from both theoretical and practical perspectives. The journal welcomes submissions of research papers, literature reviews, engineering case studies, technical notes or articles and written discussions involving advanced technology。

The HKIE also publishes the monthly magazine "Hong Kong Engineer", the Institution Yearbook and the Annual Report。

== See also ==
- Regulation and licensure in engineering
