= Professional technologist =

Certification in Canada and Malaysia

A professional technologist (P.Tech) is a class of certification of engineering technologist and professional technologist in Canada and Malaysia respectively.

The title of P.Tech is protected across Canada by copyright law, and specifically in certain jurisdictions by provincial law. The P.Tech designation came into place to align technologists with P.Engs (professional engineers). Technologists can perform the functions of a technician, but have a scope of practice more limited than an engineer or scientist.

The title is not used consistently across Canada. In some cases, the P.Tech designation is equivalent to a certified engineering technologist designation. However; in other cases, provincial legislation makes professional technologists into licensees under the local professional engineering organization, capable of practicing some professional engineering within a limited scope.

== Quebec ==
The Ordre des Technologues Professionnels du Quebec is Quebec's independent certifying body for engineering/applied science technicians and technologists.

The Ordre des Technologues Professionnels du Quebec confers the post-nominal designation of T.P. "technologue professionel" to engineering technologists who meet the standard for certification. The English post-nominal designation of P.T. "Professional Technologist" can also be used.

Members who earn this designation are allowed to carry out certain activities and seal certain engineering documents normally reserved for engineers.

Members are governed by the "Code des professions du Québec" the "Code de déontologie des technologues professionnels", and the "Loi sur les ingénieurs" and perform according to accepted norms and standards in the industry.

== Newfoundland ==
The Association of Engineering Technicians and Technologists of Newfoundland and Labrador (AETTNL) is Newfoundland and Labrador's independent certifying body for engineering/applied science technicians and technologists.

AETTNL confers the post-nominal designation of P.Tech to engineering technologists who meet the standard for certification. This designation in Newfoundland is equivalent to a certified engineering technologist elsewhere in other provinces.

Unlike every other association or society of engineering technicians and technologists in Canada, except Island Technology Professionals, AETTNL operates as a corporation. Rather than having a specific act of parliament in effect to empower the association to regulate their certifications, they rely on the CCTT's ownership of copyrights to different certifications. They have used that flexibility to give their members a different title.

== Alberta ==
The Association of Science and Engineering Technology Professionals of Alberta (ASET) is Alberta's independent certifying body for engineering/applied science technicians and technologists.

ASET confers the post-nominal designation of C.E.T. to engineering technologists who meet the standard for certification. This represents the status as a certified engineering technologist who has met a standard agreed upon across Canada.

In addition to that designation, ASET and the Association of Professional Engineers and Geoscientists of Alberta together maintain a P.Tech.(Eng.) certification, which over and above the designation of C.E.T. provides a limited license to practice professional engineering within a limited scope.

Members who earn this designation have the right to independently practice engineering and/or geoscience within a specified scope of practice that is the routine application of industry recognized codes, standards, procedures and practices using established engineering or applied science principles and methods of problem solving as specified by the ASET/APEGA Joint Board of Examiners.

This professional technologist designation is written into the provincial act regarding professional engineering, the Engineering and Geoscience Professions Act of Alberta

Specifically, “professional technologist” means an individual who is issued a certificate of registration by the ASET Registrar in accordance with this Act to engage in the practice of engineering or geo-science within the scope of practice specified by the Joint Board of Examiners.

P.Tech.(Eng.) license allows the practitioner to work independently and stamp their own work indicating they take responsibility for the work they have done. The scope of practice for a P.Tech. will be narrower and more prescribed than the defined scope of practice for a P.L.(Eng.) {Professional Licensee}

== British Columbia ==
The Applied Science Technologists and Technicians of British Columbia (ASTTBC) is British Columbia's independent certifying body for engineering/applied science technicians and technologists.

ASTTBC confers the post-nominal designations of A.Sc.T. (applied science technologist) which are symbols of achievement in engineering/applied science technology and are legally protected for use only by fully certified members in good standing. This designation in Newfoundland is equivalent to a certified engineering technologist elsewhere in other provinces.

The association is mandated and empowered by the Applied Science Technologists and Technicians Act of British Columbia. However, they are looking to Alberta's "One Act, two organizations" model to better serve the public interest.

== Malaysia ==
Under the Technologists and Technicians Act 2015 [Act 768], the Malaysia Board of Technologists (MBOT) issues Professional Technologist status to registered Graduate Technologists after passing an assessment. A minimum of 3 years of working experience is required. The Professional Technologists are entitled to bear pre-nominal letters of "Ts.", and post-nominal letters of "P.Tech." and their specializations.
