= Applied science technologist =

Applied science technologist (AScT) is a Canadian professional certification awarded on the basis of academic qualification and work experience. Abbreviated as A.Sc.T., some, but not all, Canadian provincial engineering and applied science technology associations offer this certification.

== Requirements for certification ==
- Graduation from at least a three-year post secondary program in engineering or applied science technology approved by the Canadian Technology Accreditation Board
- Two years of engineering work experience in the field that certification is sought
- Completion of an application, work history and submission of professional references
- Completion of a professional practice examination

=== Ontario ===
As of 1 July 2010, OACETT will be eliminating the A.Sc.T. title due to public confusion regarding certification requirements. Members who hold the AScT designation will be eligible to keep it while new applicants will only be able to obtain either the C.Tech. or C.E.T. designations.

== Right to use of title ==
The title of A.Sc.T., which is used as a post-nominal, is generally protected by provincial legislation. One cannot use the title or hold that one is an applied science technologist unless so certified by a provincial body associated with the Canadian Council of Technicians and Technologists.

In some provinces this title may be replaced with certified engineering technologist (CET), registered engineering technologist (RET), or more recently professional technologist (P.Tech) to more closely align with professional engineers who use the title (P.Eng).

Internationally, transferability of this title is governed by the Sydney Accord.

== See also ==
- Technologist (disambiguation)
- Incorporated engineer
- Engineering technician
- Engineering technologist
