= Washington Accord (credentials) =

International engineering degree agreement

The Washington Accord is an international accreditation agreement for undergraduate professional engineering academic degrees and postgraduate professional engineering academic degrees between the bodies responsible for accreditation in its signatory countries. The full signatories as of January 2024 are Australia, Bangladesh, Canada, China, Costa Rica, Hong Kong, India, Indonesia, Ireland, Japan, Korea, Malaysia, Mexico, New Zealand, Pakistan, Philippines, Peru, Russia, Singapore, South Africa, Sri Lanka, Taiwan, Turkey, the United Kingdom and the United States.

== Overview ==
The Washington Accord recognizes that there is substantial equivalence of programs accredited by those signatories. Graduates of accredited programs in any of the signatory countries are recognized by the other signatory countries as having met the academic requirements for entry to the practice of engineering. Recognition of accredited programs is not retroactive but takes effect only from the date of admission of the country to signatory status.

== Scope ==
The Washington Accord covers both undergraduate and postgraduate engineering degrees. Engineering technology programs are not covered by the accord. Engineering technology programs are covered under the Sydney Accord and Dublin Accord. Only qualifications awarded after the signatory country or region became part of the Washington Accord are recognized. The accord is not directly responsible for the licensing of professional engineers and the registration of chartered engineers but it does cover the academic requirements that are part of the licensing processes in signatory countries.

== Signatories ==
Signatory status: (2025) Full signatory Partial signatory

The following are the signatory countries and territories of the Washington Accord, their respective accreditation bodies and years of admission:

Flag	Member State	Member Institution	Year of admission
(Australia)	Australia	Engineers Australia	1989
(Bangladesh)	Bangladesh	Institution of Engineers, Bangladesh	2023
(Canada)	Canada	Engineers Canada	1989
(China)	China	China Association for Science and Technology	2016
(Costa Rica)	Costa Rica	Association of Engineers and Architects of Costa Rica	2020
(Hong Kong)	Hong Kong	The Hong Kong Institution of Engineers	1995
(India)	India	National Board of Accreditation	2014
(Indonesia)	Indonesia	Persatuan Insinyur Indonesia (PII)	2022
(Republic of Ireland)	Ireland	Engineers Ireland	1989
(Japan)	Japan	Japan Accreditation Board for Engineering Education	2005
(Malaysia)	Malaysia	Board of Engineers Malaysia (BEM)	2009
(Mexico)	Mexico	Consejo de Acreditación de la Enseñanza de la Ingeniería (CACEI)	2022
(New Zealand)	New Zealand	Engineering New Zealand	1989
(Pakistan)	Pakistan	Pakistan Engineering Council	2017
(Philippines)	Philippines	Philippine Technological Council	2023
(Peru)	Peru	ICACIT	2018
(Russia)	Russia	Association for Engineering Education of Russia	2012
(Singapore)	Singapore	Institution of Engineers Singapore	2006
(South Africa)	South Africa	Engineering Council of South Africa	1999
(South Korea)	South Korea	Accreditation Board for Engineering Education of Korea	2007
(Sri Lanka)	Sri Lanka	Institution of Engineers, Sri Lanka	2014
(Taiwan)	Taiwan	Institute of Engineering Education Taiwan	2007
(Turkey)	Turkey	MÜDEK	2011
(United Kingdom)	United Kingdom	Engineering Council	1989
(United States)	United States	ABET	1989

The following countries have provisional signatory status and may become full signatory members in the future:

Flag	State	Institution	Provisional Status Approved
(Chile)	Chile	Acredita CI	2018
(Kenya)	Kenya	Engineers Board of Kenya (EBK)	2025
(Mauritius)	Mauritius	Institution of Engineers Mauritius (IEM)	2024
(Myanmar)	Myanmar	Myanmar Engineering Council	2019
(Nigeria)	Nigeria	Council for the Regulation of Engineering in Nigeria	2023
(Saudi Arabia)	Saudi Arabia	Education and Training Evaluation Commission (ETEC)	2022
(Thailand)	Thailand	Thailand Accreditation Board of Engineering Education	2019

== See also ==
- Regulation and licensure in engineering
- Seoul Accord
- European Engineer
