= Registered engineering technologist =

In Canada, a registered engineering technologist (R.E.T.) is a person holding a particular category of membership of the Association of Science and Engineering Technology Professionals of Alberta (ASET). This designation is only used in the province of Alberta.

No new R.E.T. designations have been issued in Alberta since October 2009, following proclamation of the new provincial Engineering, Geological and Geophysical Professions Amendment Act. Existing R.E.T.'s in Alberta are not grandfathered into Alberta's newer P.Tech designation, as the certification criteria for a P.Tech. designation is different from the older R.E.T. designation. The R.E.T. designation in Alberta is being phased out over time. Existing R.E.T.'s may retain their title to the conclusion of their careers. However, no new R.E.T. applications are being accepted. One of the reasons that the R.E.T. designation being phased out is that it is only recognized in Alberta and is not transferable to any other province.
