= Certified engineering technician =

Certified engineering technician (CTech) is a Canadian professional certification awarded on the basis of academic qualification and work experience. Abbreviated as C.Tech., most Canadian provincial engineering and applied science technology associations offer this certification. They are closely related to a certified engineering technologist and share the same professional association.
