= Technology Professionals Canada =

Organization in Canada

- Founded: 2010
- Purpose: Certification of engineering technicians and technologists
- Website: www.technologyprofessionals.ca

Technology Professionals Canada (TPC) is an organization that advocates for the professions of technicians, applied science technologists and engineering technologists within the provinces of their member organizations.

== History ==
It was founded in 2010 as a partnership between associations of technology professions in British Columbia, Alberta, Saskatchewan, and Ontario.

The organization came about when several associations of certified engineering technology ceased their membership with the Canadian Council of Technicians and Technologists (CCTT). The professional associations of Manitoba, New Brunswick, Nova Scotia, Prince Edward Island, and Newfoundland and Labrador remained in CCTT until 2021 when CCTT joined TPC.

== Accreditation ==
TPC has created a new standard accreditation model, called Technology Accreditation Canada, based on a comprehensive review of current technology accreditation practices conducted by the Canadian Standards Association.

This accreditation model is being set up under a different organization, called Technology Accreditation Canada.

== International transferability of title ==
As of June 2023, TPC is a signatory to the Dublin and Sydney accords as well as the mobility agreements for technicians and technologists.

== Membership ==
TPC consists of 9 of the 10 provincial associations of certified engineering technicians and technologists in Canada, and represents over 85% of the certified engineering technicians and technologists in Canada.

Membership consists of the Applied Science Technologists and Technicians of British Columbia, Association of Science and Engineering Technology Professionals of Alberta, Ontario Association of Certified Engineering Technicians and Technologists, and Saskatchewan Applied Science Technologists and Technicians, Certified Technicians and Technologists Association of Manitoba, New Brunswick Society of Certified Engineering Technicians and Technologists, Island Technology Professionals, Technova, and Association of Engineering Technicians and Technologists of Newfoundland and Labrador
