= Engineering technologist =

Profession

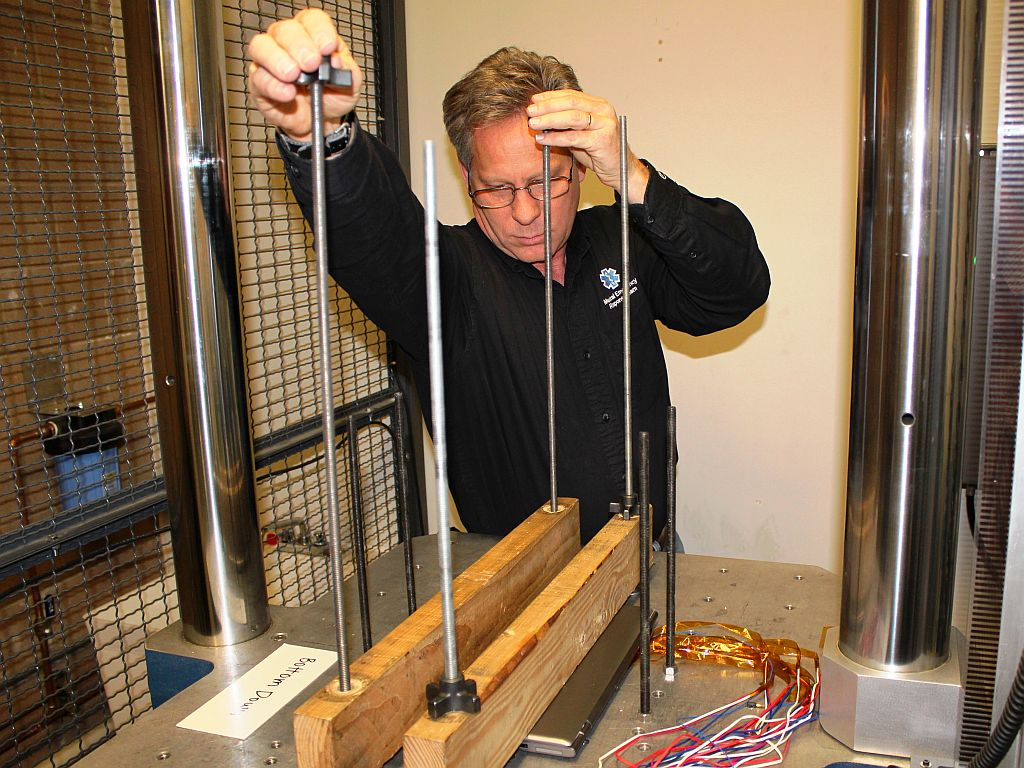
An engineering technologist at Intel tests an ultrabook for mechanical shock, using a hydraulic platform to model a 3-foot drop onto concrete

An engineering technologist is a professional trained in certain aspects of development and implementation of a respective area of technology. An education in engineering technology concentrates more on application and less on theory than does an engineering education. Engineering technologists often assist engineers; but after years of experience, they can also become engineers. Like engineers, areas where engineering technologists can work include product design, fabrication, and testing. Engineering technologists sometimes rise to senior management positions in industry or become entrepreneurs.

Engineering technologists are more likely than engineers to focus on post-development implementation, product manufacturing, or operation of technology. The American National Society of Professional Engineers (NSPE) makes the distinction that engineers are trained in conceptual skills, to "function as designers", while engineering technologists "apply others' designs". The mathematics and sciences, as well as other technical courses, in engineering technology programs, are taught with more application-based examples, whereas engineering coursework provides a more theoretical foundation in math and science. Moreover, engineering coursework tends to require higher-level mathematics including calculus and calculus-based theoretical science courses, as well as more extensive knowledge of the natural sciences, which serves to prepare students for research (whether in graduate studies or industrial R&D) as opposed to engineering technology coursework which focuses on algebra, trigonometry, applied calculus, and other courses that are more practical than theoretical in nature and generally have more labs that involve the hands-on application of the topics studied.

In the United States, although some states require, without exception, a BS degree in engineering at schools with programs accredited by the Engineering Accreditation Commission (EAC) of the Accreditation Board for Engineering and Technology (ABET), about two-thirds of the states accept BS degrees in engineering technology accredited by the Engineering Technology Accreditation Commission (ETAC) of the ABET, in order to become licensed as professional engineers. States have different requirements as to the years of experience needed to take the Fundamentals of Engineering (FE) and Professional Engineering (PE) exams. A few states require those sitting for the exams to have a master's degree in engineering. This education model is in line with the educational system in the United Kingdom where an accredited MEng or MSc degree in engineering is required by the Engineering Council (EngC) to be registered as a Chartered Engineer. Engineering technology graduates can earn an MS degree in engineering technology, engineering, engineering management, construction management, or a National Architectural Accrediting Board (NAAB)-accredited Master of Architecture degree. These degrees are also offered online or through distance-learning programs at various universities, both nationally and internationally, which allows individuals to continue working full-time while earning an advanced degree.

== Nature of the work ==
Engineering technologists are more likely to work in testing, fabrication/construction or fieldwork, while engineers generally focus more on conceptual design and product development, with considerable overlap (e.g., testing and fabrication are often integral to the overall product development process and can involve engineers as well as engineering technologists).

Engineering technologists are employed in a wide array of industries and areas including product development, manufacturing and maintenance. They may become managers depending upon the experience and their educational emphasis on management. Entry-level positions relating in various ways to product design, product testing, product development, systems development, field engineering, technical operations, and quality control are common for engineering technologists. Most companies generally make no distinction between engineers and engineering technologists when it comes to hiring.

== Education and accreditation ==
Beginning in the 1950s and 1960s, some post-secondary institutions in the U.S. and Canada began offering degrees in engineering technology, focusing on applied study rather than the more theoretical studies required for engineering degrees. The focus on applied study addressed a need within the scientific, manufacturing, and engineering communities, as well as other industries, for professionals with hands-on and applications-based engineering knowledge. Depending on the institution, associate's or bachelor's degrees are offered, with some institutions also offering advanced degrees in engineering technology.

In general, an engineering technologist receives a broad range of applied science and applied mathematics training, as well as the fundamentals of engineering in the student's area of focus. Engineering technology programs typically include instruction in providing support to specific engineering specialties. Information technology is primarily involved with the management, operation, and maintenance of computer systems and networks, along with an application of technology in diverse fields such as architecture, engineering, graphic design, telecommunications, computer science, and network security. An engineering technologist is also expected to have had some coursework in ethics.

In 2001, Professional organizations from different countries have signed a mutual recognition agreement called the Sydney Accord, which represents an understanding that the academic credentials of engineering technologists will be recognized in all signatory states. The recognition given engineering technologists under the Sydney Accord can be compared to the Washington Accord for engineers and the Dublin Accord for engineering technicians. The Engineering Technologist Mobility Forum (ETMF) is an international forum held by signatories of the Sydney Accord to explore mutual recognition for experienced engineering technologists and to remove artificial barriers to the free movement and practice of engineering technologists amongst their countries. ETMF can be compared to the Engineers Mobility Forum (EMF) for engineers.

Graduates acquiring an associate degree, or lower, typically find careers as engineering technicians. According to the United States Bureau of Labor Statistics: "Many four-year colleges offer bachelor's degrees in engineering technology and graduates of these programs are hired to work as entry-level engineers or applied engineers, but not technicians." Engineering technicians typically have a two-year associate degree, while engineering technologists have a bachelor's degrees.

=== Canada ===
In Canada, the new occupational category of "technologist" was established in the 1960s, in conjunction with an emerging system of community colleges and technical institutes. It was designed to effectively bridge the gap between the increasingly theoretical nature of engineering degrees and the predominantly practical approach of technician and trades programs. Provincial associations may certify individuals as a professional technologist (P.Tech.), certified engineering technologist (C.E.T.), registered engineering technologist (R.E.T.), applied science technologist (AScT), or technologue professionel (T.P.). These provincial associations are constituent members of Technology Professionals Canada (TPC), which accredits technology programs across Canada, through its Technology Accreditation Canada (TAC). Nationally accredited engineering technology programs range from two to three years in length, depending on the province, and often require as many classroom hours as a 4-year degree program.

=== United States ===
In the United States, the U.S. Department of Education or the Council for Higher Education Accreditation (CHEA) are at the top of the educational accreditation hierarchy. The U.S. Department of Education acknowledges regional and national accreditation and CHEA recognizes specialty accreditation. One technology accreditation is currently recognized by CHEA: The Association of Technology, Management and Applied Engineering (ATMAE). CHEA recognizes ATMAE for accrediting associate, baccalaureate, and master's degree programs in technology, applied technology, engineering technology, and technology-related disciplines delivered by national or regional accredited institutions in the United States. As of March 2019, ABET withdrew from CHEA recognition

The National Institute for Certification in Engineering Technologies (NICET) awards certification at two levels, depending on work experience: the Associate Engineering Technologist (AT) and the Certified Engineering Technologist (CT). ATMAE awards two levels of certification in technology management: Certified Technology Manager (CTM) and Certified Senior Technology Manager (CSTM). ATMAE also awards two levels of certification of manufacturing specialist: Certified Manufacturing Specialist (CMS) and Certified Senior Manufacturing Specialist (CSMS). In 2020, ATMAE announced offering the Certified Controls Engineer (CCE) and Certified Senior Controls Engineer (CSCE) professional certifications. While the CTM, CMS, and CCE certifications are obtained through examination, the CSTM, CSMS and CSCE require industry experience and continuous improvement via the obtainment of professional development units (PDUs).

The American Society of Certified Engineering Technicians (ASCET) is a membership organization that issues Certified Member certifications to engineering technicians and engineering technologists. Professional engineers are issued Registered Member certification.

=== United Kingdom ===
The United Kingdom has a decades-long tradition of producing engineering technologists via the apprenticeship system. UK engineering technologists have always been designated as "engineers", which in the UK is used to describe the entire range of skilled workers and professionals, from tradespeople through to the highly-educated Chartered Engineer. In fact, up until the 1960s, professional engineers in the UK were often referred to as "Technologists" to distinguish them from scientists, technicians, and craftspeople. The modern term for an engineering technologist is "incorporated engineer" (IEng), although since 2000 the normal route to achieving IEng is with a bachelor's or honors degree in engineering or technology. Modern technical apprenticeships would normally lead to the engineering technician (EngTech) professional qualification and, with further studies at higher apprenticeship level, an IEng. Since 2015, the Universities and Colleges Admissions Service (UCAS) has introduced engineering degree (bachelors and masters) apprenticeships. The title "incorporated engineer" is protected by civil law. Prior to the title "incorporated engineer", UK technologists were known as "technician engineers" a designation introduced in the 1960s.

In the United Kingdom, an incorporated engineer is accepted as a "professional engineer", registered by the Engineering Council, although the term "professional engineer" has no legal in the UK, and there are no restrictions in practice. In fact, anyone in the UK can call themselves an "engineer" or "professional engineer" without any qualifications or proven competencies in engineering, and most UK skilled trades are sometimes referred to as "professional" or "accredited" engineers. Examples are Registered Gas Engineer (gas installer) or "Professional Telephone Engineer" (phone line installer or fault diagnosis). Incorporated engineers are recognized internationally through the Sydney Accord academic agreement as engineering technologists. One of the professional titles of engineers in the United Kingdom, recognized in the Washington Accord is chartered engineer. The incorporated engineer is a professional engineer as declared by the Engineering Council of the United Kingdom (ECUK).

The European designation, as demonstrated by the prescribed title under 2005/36/EC, is "engineer". The incorporated engineer operates autonomously and directs activities independently. They do not necessarily need the support of chartered engineers, because they are often acknowledged as full engineers in the UK (but not in Canada or the US). The United Kingdom incorporated engineer may also contribute to the design of new products and systems.

The chartered engineer and incorporated engineer, whilst often undertaking similar roles, are distinct qualifications awarded by the EngC, with Chartered Engineer (CEng) status being the terminal engineering qualification.

Incorporated engineers currently require an IEng-accredited bachelors or honors degree in engineering or technology (prior to 1997 the B.Sc. and B.Eng. degrees satisfied the academic requirements for "chartered engineer" registration), a Higher National Certificate or diploma, City and Guilds of London Institute higher diploma/full technological cert diploma, or a Foundation Degree in engineering or technology, plus appropriate further learning to degree level, or an NVQ4 or SVQ4 qualifications approved for the purpose by a licensed engineering institution.

The academic requirements must be accompanied by the appropriate peer-reviewed experience in employment—typically 4 years post qualification. In addition to the experience and academic requirements, the engineering candidate must have three referees (themselves CEng or IEng) who vouch for the performance of the individual being considered for professional recognition. There are a number of alternative ways to achieve IEng status for those that do not have the necessary qualifications for applicants, but who can clearly show they have achieved the same level as those with qualifications, including:

- writing a technical report, based upon their experience and demonstrate their knowledge and understanding of engineering principles;
- earning the City and Guilds graduate diploma (bachelors level) and a postgraduate diploma (masters level) accredited by the Institution of Mechanical Engineers (IMechE), Institution of Engineering and Technology (IET) and Institution of Civil Engineers (ICE);
- following a work-based learning program;
- or taking an academic program specified by the institution to which they are applying.

=== Germany – European Union ===
==== Engineering technologist / state-certified engineer ====
The engineering technologist (state-certified technician; German: Staatlich geprüfter Techniker) are vocational (non-academic) qualifications at the tertiary level in Germany. The degree is governed by the framework agreement of trade and technical schools (resolution of the Standing Conference of the Ministers of Education and Cultural Affairs of the states in the Federal Republic of Germany of 7 November 2002 in its respective applicable version) and is recognised by all states of the Federal Republic of Germany. It is awarded after passing state examinations at state or state-recognised technical school or academies (German: Fachschule/Fachakademie). Through the Vocational Training Modernisation Act (12.12.2019), state-certified engineers are also allowed to hold the title Bachelor Professional in Technik as of 1 January 2020.

To be eligible for the engineering technologist examination, candidates must fulfill the following requirements: completion of one of the school systems (Hauptschule, Realschule, Gymnasium), an apprenticeship of at least two years duration, one year of completed professional work experience and attendance of an educational program with a course load of 2400–3000 hours, usually completed within two years, full-time, or 3.5–4 years, part-time, at vocational colleges.

==== State-certified technicians/engineers in the EU directives ====
As of 31 January 2012, state-certified engineers, state-certified business managers and state-certified designers are at level 6-bachelor in the European Qualifications Framework (EQF), equivalent to a bachelor's degree. As such, the engineering technologist constitutes an advanced entry qualification for German universities and in principle permits entry into any undergraduate academic-degree program.

The qualifications are listed in EU Directives as recognised, regulated professions in Germany and the EU. Annexes C and D were added to Council Directive 92/51/EEC as a second general system for the recognition of professional education and training to supplement Directive 89/48/EEC.

Institutions involved included the federal government (in Germany, the Federal Ministry of Education and Research and the Federal Ministry of Economics and Technology), EU Standing Conference and Economic Ministerial Meeting of Countries, the German Chamber of Crafts, the Confederation of German Employers' Associations, German Chambers of Industry and Commerce, Confederation of German Trade Unions, and the Federal Institute for Vocational Application. These government institutions agreed on a common position regarding the implementation of the EQF and a German qualifications framework (DQR).

European Union law and other documents considered to be public include:

- Annexes C and D to Council Directive 92/51/EEC on a second general system for the recognition of professional education and training to supplement Directive 89/48/EEC
- EU Directive 2005L0036-EN 01.01.2007
- ANNEX III list of regulated education and training referred to in the third subparagraph of Article 13(2)

== See also ==
- National Council of Examiners for Engineering and Surveying
- American Society for Engineering Education
- UNESCO-UNEVOC
- Practical engineer
- Drafter
