= Engineering technician =

Professional with technology skills

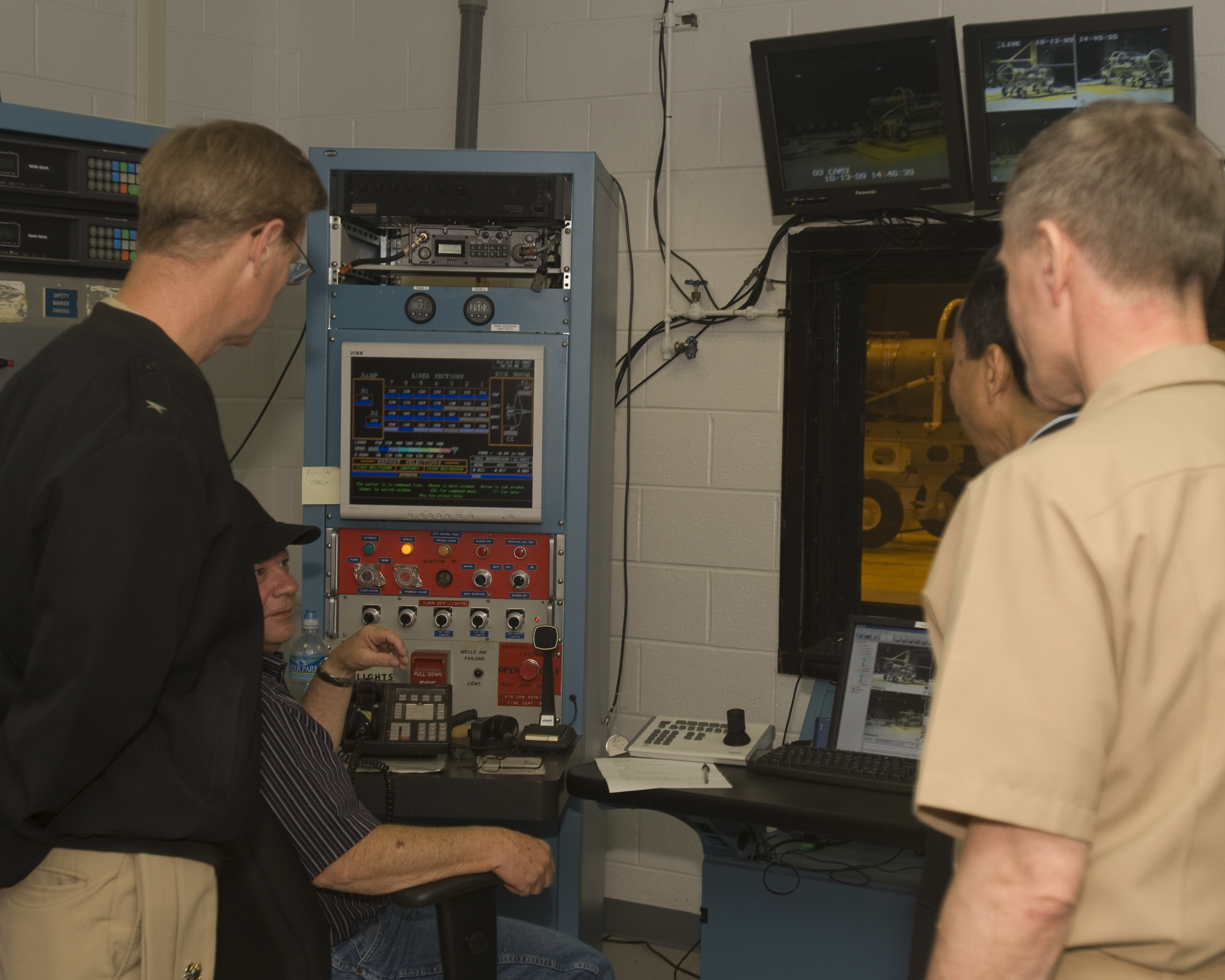
An engineering technician explains instrument readings

An engineering technician is a professional trained in skills and techniques related to a specific branch of technology, with a practical understanding of the relevant engineering concepts. Engineering technicians often assist in projects relating to research and development, or focus on post-development activities like implementation or operation.

The Dublin Accord was signed in 2002 as an international agreement recognizing engineering technician qualifications. The Dublin Accord is analogous to the Washington Accord for engineers and the Sydney Accord for engineering technologists.

== Nature of work ==
Engineering technicians help solve technical problems in many ways. They build or set up equipment, conduct experiments, collect data, and calculate results. They might also help to make a model of new equipment. Some technicians work in quality control, checking products, tests, and collecting data. In manufacturing, they help to design and develop products. They also find ways to produce things efficiently. There are multiple fields in this job such as; software design, repair, etc. They may also be people who produce technical drawings or engineering drawings.

Engineering technicians are responsible for using the theories and principles of science, engineering, and mathematics to solve problems and come up with solutions in the research, design, development, manufacturing, sales, construction, inspection, and maintenance of systems and products. Engineering technicians help engineers and scientists in researching and developing, while some other engineering technicians may be responsible for inspections, quality control, and processes which may include conducting tests and data collection.

== Education ==
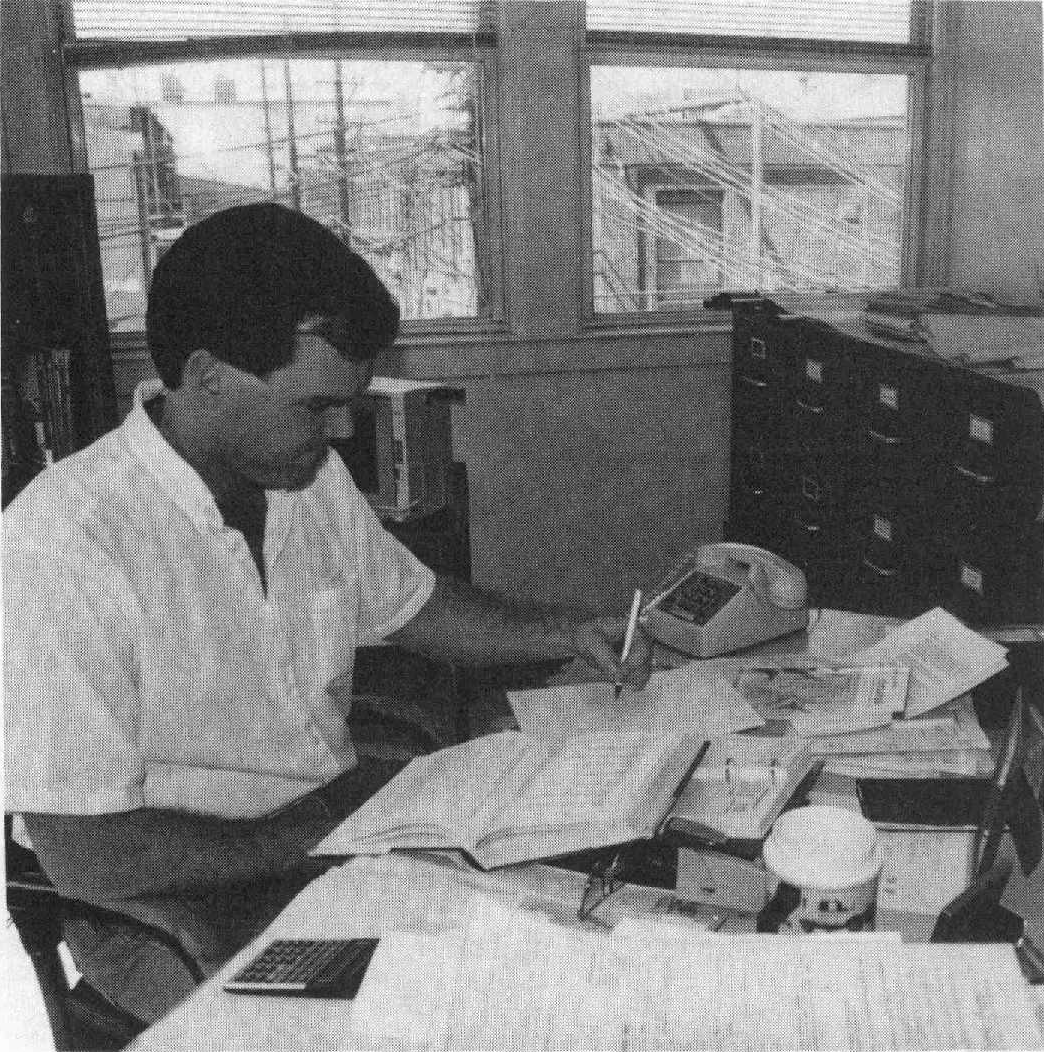
An engineering technician at work. (1992)

Engineering technician diplomas and two-year degrees are generally offered by technical schools and non-university higher education institutions like colleges of further education, vocational schools, and community colleges. Many four-year colleges and universities offer bachelor's degrees in engineering technology but engineering technologists are somewhat different from engineering technicians.

In Portugal and Spain, the titles Portuguese: engenharia técnica and Spanish: ingeniería técnica (literally 'technical engineering') are used. Professionals attain the title with the award of a short-cycle three- to four-year undergraduate degree (associate degree or bachelor's degree) in a technical engineering field from colleges or technical engineering institutes (in Portugal) and (in Spain), from universities. Spanish "technical engineers" have full competency in their respective professional fields of engineering, being the difference that the three or four-year Engineers have competence only in their specialty (Mechanical, Electrical, Chemical, etc.), and the "Engineering Superior School" Engineers have wider competencies.

In the United States, the engineering technology accreditation commission (ETAC) of the Accreditation Board for Engineering and Technology (ABET) grants two-year associate degree programs to students that meet a set of specified standards. These programs include at least a college algebra and trigonometry course and, if needed, one or two basic science courses at any accredited school. The number of math and science prerequisite courses depends on the branch of engineering that the student chooses.

Engineering technicians apply scientific and engineering skills usually gained in postsecondary programs below the bachelor's degree level or through short-cycle bachelor's degrees. However, some university institutions award undergraduate degrees in the engineering field, which may confer the title of Engineering technician to the student, who is eligible to become a fully chartered engineer after further studies at the master's degree level. Engineering technicians are called professional engineers in the UK only.

== Certification ==
Even though the term engineering technician is used throughout, it is mindful that these roles are often termed differently within specific jurisdictions. It also includes roles such as; certified or professional technician, which may also be called engineering associates.

=== Canada ===
The individual professional title Certified Technician and post-nominal C.Tech. are protected by provincial legislation and can only be used by registrants certified by engineering and applied science member organizations. The nine provincial professional associations are unified federally through Technology Professionals Canada, which advocates for the profession within the provincial associations and respective regulatory bodies.

=== United Kingdom ===
In the United Kingdom, the term Engineering Technician and post-nominal EngTech are protected in civil law and can only be used by technicians registered with the Engineering Council UK.

== See also ==
- Practical engineer
- Drafter
- American Society for Engineering Education
- National Council of Examiners for Engineering and Surveying
- UNESCO-UNEVOC
