= Sydney Accord =

International mutual recognition agreement

The Sydney Accord is an international mutual recognition agreement for qualifications in the fields of engineering technology.

== Definition and background ==
The Sydney Accord is an agreement between the bodies responsible for accrediting engineering technologist qualification programs in each of the signatory countries. It recognizes the substantial equivalency of programs accredited by those bodies, and recommends that graduates of accredited programs in any of the signatory countries be recognized by the other countries as having met the academic requirements for entry to the practice of engineering technologist. The Sydney Accord was signed in 2001.

== Scope ==
The Sydney Accord is an international agreement that acknowledges the educational qualifications of engineering technologists. It encompasses programs such as the Bachelor of Engineering Science and Bachelor of Engineering Technology. Conversely, the Bachelor of Engineering qualifications are recognized under the separate Washington Accord.

The scope of the Sydney Accord only covers the academic requirement for an engineering technologist qualification. Engineering technologist titles do not transfer directly between signatory countries that don't have reciprocating agreements, because the signatory countries reserve the right to scrutinize foreign titles and compare them to their own licensing criteria. However, this does not mean the titles are not respected by employers within those signatory countries.

The engineering technologist may be hired within a country by an employer where a formal license is not required. The industrial exemption clause negates formal engineering registration within the United States for those who meet the criteria.

Foreign titles may be utilized as a foundation for recognition of professional licensing. The titles can be supplemented with additional experience and/or training to meet the local definition of formal registration. This serves to underline that a foreign technologist covered under the accord does not arrive in a fellow signatory country without merit. The Sydney Accord is therefore not a hollow agreement without advantages.

== Accord Enhancements ==
The Canadian Council of Technicians and Technologists (CCTT) and the United Kingdom's Institution of Incorporated Engineers (IIE) signed a reciprocating agreement of recognition for engineering technologist. In 2006, the IIE merged with the Institute of Electrical Engineers (IEE) to form the Institution of Engineering and Technology (IET). The CCTT also signed a reciprocating agreement with the National Institute for Certification in Engineering Technologies (NICET). NICET is a United States organization sponsored by the National Society of Professional Engineers (NSPE). The formal recognition of the CCTT as a common link between NICET and the IET has not been realized.

== Signatories ==
The following are the signatories of the Sydney Accord, their respective countries, and years of admission:

- Australia - Engineers Australia (2001)
- Canada - Technology Professionals Canada (2023)
- Taiwan - Institute of Engineering Education Taiwan (2014)
- Hong Kong - The Hong Kong Institution of Engineers (2001)
- Ireland - Engineers Ireland (2001)
- Korea - Accreditation Board for Engineering Education of Korea (ABEEK) (2013)
- Malaysia - Board of Engineers Malaysia (2018)
- New Zealand - Institution of Professional Engineers New Zealand (2001)
- South Africa - Engineering Council of South Africa (2001)
- United Kingdom - Engineering Council UK (2001)
- United States - ABET (2009)

The following are provisional signatories of the Sydney Accord, their respective countries, and years of admission:

- Peru - Instituto de Calidad y Acreditacion de Programas de Computacion, Ingenieriay Tecnologia (ICACIT)
- Sri Lanka - Institution of Engineers, Sri Lanka

=== Canada ===
Canada has signed the Sydney Accord with the title of "Applied Science" and "Engineering Technologist".

From 2002-2022, the Canadian Council of Technicians and Technologists (CCTT) represented Canada in the Sydney accord. In 2023 Technology Professionals Canada took the CCTT's place in representing Canada.

=== Hong Kong ===
Hong Kong originally signed the Sydney Accord with the title of "Science Technologist" and later abbreviated the title to "Technologist."

=== United States ===
The United States applied for recognition with the Sydney Accord in 2007 and was granted that status in 2009. Despite this achievement the United States still has significant confusion in defining a unified technologist registration for professionals. Part of the reason for this is that the engineering technology profession is not well defined as a separate profession (distinct from professional engineering) in the United States. This is because the National Society of Professional Engineers (NSPE) has opposed legal registration of technologist by the United States government through a licensing program. The loss of government oversight has led to competing ideologies from societies with different perspectives on what represents the qualities of a technologist.

==== Confusion ====
Some legitimate societies and organizations that have established technology programs do not have clear representation in the accord. The Society of Manufacturing Engineers (SME), and the Society of Broadcast Engineers (SBE) are two organizations that have engineering technology and technician certifications that are respected and recognized but operate independently from the accord. In addition to these societies there are legitimate accreditations that are unacknowledged. They are the Distance Education and Training Council (DETC), the National Association of Industrial Technology (NAIT), the Accrediting Commission of Career Schools and Colleges of Technology (ACCSCT), or other non-ABET/TAC institutions that are exclusively regionally accredited. It is unclear if these organizations or societies will eventually be represented by a formal avenue of recognition in the Sydney Accord.

== Registrations ==
As an international representative of the accord the UK offer a registration program for individuals from any country. However, since the standards for technologist are higher in UK (B.Sc. and B.Eng. in Engineering or Technology) only 25 UK (emigrating) registrants up to this date applied for registration as "Technologist" indicating the failure of the Accord within UK. In the UK the term "engineer", "professional engineer" or "engineering" have no meaning in law so anyone can call themselves a professional engineer, or technologist without restrictions. However the titles "Chartered Engineer", "Incorporated Engineer" and "Engineering Technician" awarded by The Engineering Council (UK) are protected by law. United States' graduates may apply for a peer review by the Engineering Council UK if they belong to one of the organizations or societies that are not explicitly mentioned as a member of the accord. Individuals that graduate from a regionally accredited technology program are likely to receive acceptance through professional engineering registration as an Incorporated Engineer.

In the U.S. professional registration is regulated by each state individually. While the profession of engineering technologist is not specifically recognized, many states provide engineering technologists with a pathway towards Professional Engineer (PE) licensing that bypasses national engineering requirements. This is opposed by the national regulatory and representative bodies for professional engineers, the National Society of Professional Engineers (NSPE). Notably, the Washington Accord does not apply to American PEs who have obtained this status through a technologist route.

== See also ==
- Dublin Accord – engineering technicians
- Seoul Accord – computing and information technology
- Certified engineering technologist
