= Seoul Accord =

The Seoul Accord is an international accreditation agreement for professional computing and information technology academic degrees, between the bodies responsible for accreditation in its signatory countries. Established in 2008, the signatories as of 2016 are Australia, Canada, Taiwan, Hong Kong, Japan, Korea, the United Kingdom and the United States. Provisional signatories include Ireland, New Zealand, Mexico, Philippines, Sri Lanka and Malaysia. In 2021, Mexico officially became a signatory. In 2024, Saudi Arabia, Ireland, Indonesian, Malaysia add in one of signatories, while Sri Lanka, Peru, Philippines are provisional status. On the other hand, New Zealand quit at same year.

This agreement mutually recognizes tertiary level computing and IT qualifications between the signatory agencies. Graduates of accredited programs in any of the signatory countries are recognized by the other signatory countries as having met the academic requirements as IT professionals.

== Scope ==
The Seoul Accord covers tertiary undergraduate computing degrees. Engineering and Engineering Technology programs are not covered by the Seoul accord, although some Software engineering programs have dual accreditation with the Washington Accord.

== Signatories ==
Signatories of the Seoul Accord, Their Respective Countries and Territories, and Years of Admission:
Flag	Member State	Member Institution	Year of Admission
(Australia)	Australia	Australian Computer Society (ACS)	2008
(Canada)	Canada	Canadian Information Processing Society (CIPS)	2008
(Hong Kong)	Hong Kong	Hong Kong Institution of Engineers (HKIE)	2008
(Indonesia)	Indonesia	Indonesian Accreditation Board for Education (IABEE)	2024
(Republic of Ireland)	Ireland	Engineers Ireland (EI)	2024
(Japan)	Japan	Japan Accreditation Board for Engineering Education (JABEE)	2008
(Malaysia)	Malaysia	Malaysia Board of Technologists (MBOT)	2024
(Mexico)	Mexico	Consejo Nacional de Acreditación en Informática y Computación, A. C. (CONAIC)	2021
(Saudi Arabia)	Saudi Arabia	Education and Training Evaluation Commission (ETEC) - National Center of Academic Accreditation and Evaluation (NCAAA)	2024
(South Korea)	South Korea	Accreditation Board for Engineering Education of Korea (ABEEK)	2008
(Taiwan)	Taiwan	Institute of Engineering Education Taiwan (IEET)	2009
(United Kingdom)	United Kingdom	British Computer Society (BCS)	2008
(United States)	United States	ABET	2008

Provisional Signatories of the Seoul Accord, along with their respective countries and territories and years of Initial Recognition:
Flag	Member State	Member Institution	Provisional Status Recognised
(Peru)	Peru	Instituto de Calidad y Acreditacion de Programas de Computacion, Ingenieriay Tecnologia (ICACIT)	2022
(Philippines)	Philippines	PCS Information and Computing Accreditation Board (PICAB)	2015
(Sri Lanka)	Sri Lanka	Computer Society of Sri Lanka (CSSL)	2018

== See also ==
- Sydney Accord - engineering technologists
- Dublin Accord - engineering technicians
- EQANIE - European accreditation
- Chartered Engineer
- Outcome-based education
- Professional Engineer
