= Abhaya Induruwa =

Sri Lankan engineer and educator

Professor Abhaya Induruwa
- මහාචාර්ය අභය ඉඳුරුව
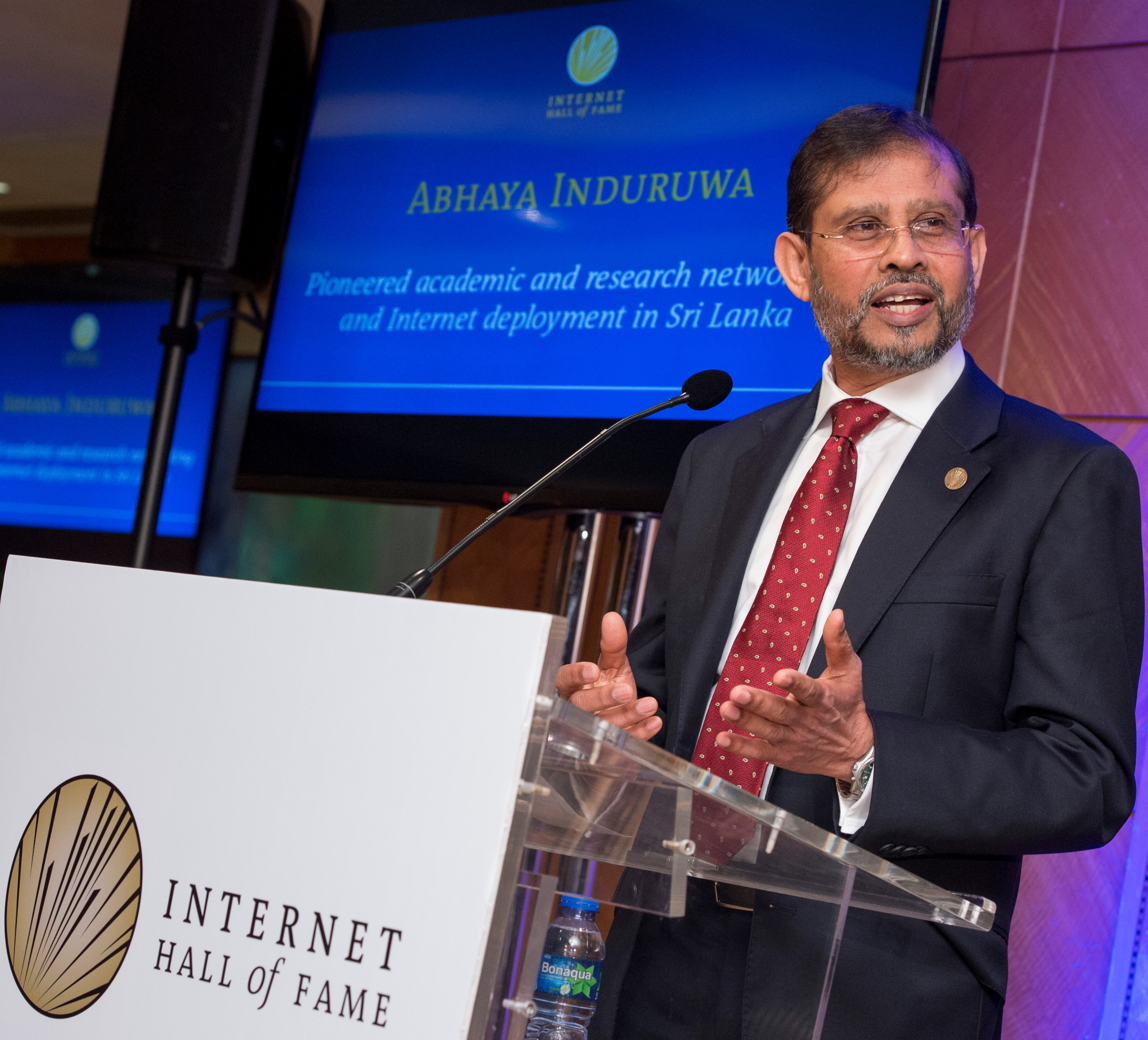
- Professor Abhaya Induruwa delivering his Internet Hall of Fame Acceptance Speech in 2014
- Born: Dalugama, Kelaniya Sri Lanka
- Education: Nalanda College, Colombo; University of Sri Lanka, Katubedda Campus; Imperial College London
- Occupations: Endowed Professor (Sri Lanka) and Director, Cyber Innovation Hub (CCCU - UK)
- Known for: Pioneering Computer Science & Engineering education at the University of Moratuwa, Pioneering Internet & Academic and Research Networking (LEARN ) in Sri Lanka
- Awards: 2003 - Honorary Fellow of the Computer Society of Sri Lanka; 2014 - Internet Hall of Fame Lifetime achievement award of the Internet Society; 2015 -Internet Pioneers Award at the 20th Anniversary of Internet in Sri Lanka; 2017 - Zero-One Lifetime Achievement Award of Sri Lanka Telecom; 2019 - LEARN Pioneer Award at the 30th Anniversary of LEARN; 2024 - National ICT Lifetime Achievement Award of the BCS Sri Lanka section

Abhaya Induruwa (Sinhala: අභය ඉඳුරුව) is a Sri Lankan engineer and educator who is known for pioneering Computer Science & Engineering education in Sri Lanka. He founded LEARN Internet, the country's IP network for academic and research communities in Sri Lanka. He served as the inaugural Professor V K Samaranayake Endowed Professor of Computing, University of Colombo School of Computing, Sri Lanka. Having served as the Director of Cyber Innovation Hub he retired from the Canterbury Christ Church University in the United Kingdom where he researched into security and forensic investigation of Internet of Things (IoT) with a special interest in security vulnerabilities of smart home appliances. Currently he is engaged in promoting IoT in digital agriculture as a disruptive technology, primarily in developing countries, leading to smart agriculture resulting in higher yields in food production. Induruwa is considered the father of Internet in Sri Lanka.

== Education ==
After spending three years of his early primary education at Kahagolla Madya Maha Vidyalaya, Diyatalawa, he was admitted to Nalanda College, Colombo from where he proceeded to the University of Sri Lanka, Katubedda Campus. He is the first student to graduate with a First Class Honours degree in Electrical or Electronics Engineering since the inception of the University of Sri Lanka, Katubedda Campus, and is the recipient of the Prof Om Prakash Kulshreshtha award for the Best Electrical and Electronic Engineering student in 1975. In September 1976 he proceeded to Imperial College London and in January 1980 he was awarded PhD from the University of London for his research on Computer Simulation Techniques in Power Systems Planning. His research supervisor was emeritus Professor Brian J. Cory.

== Professional career ==
Induruwa founded the Department of Computer Science and Engineering at the University of Moratuwa in 1985, the first and the only department of its kind in a Sri Lankan university, and served as its Head until 1998.

In 1989 he pioneered and served as the Principal Investigator of project LEARN (Lanka Education and Research Network), which he developed into the academic Internet in Sri Lanka . He obtained funds from the Sri Lankan government and other well wishers, commissioned staff and resources, provided technical and managerial leadership, and led the project LEARN to completion in 1995. He also administered the .LK domain since its first registration in 1990 until 1998.

Induruwa is a founding member of the Internet Society (ISOC - Kobe, 1992) and a member of the Internet Society Sri Lanka Chapter. He serves as a Member of the Advisory Group of the Asia Internet History project, and is a contributing author.

He is a Chartered Engineer, a Chartered Fellow of the Institution of Engineering and Technology, UK, Chartered Fellow of the Institution of Engineers, Sri Lanka, and a Chartered Fellow of the British Computer Society.

CSSL Newsletter, April 2014

Induruwa is a founding member of the Computer Society of Sri Lanka (1976). In recognition of his services to computer education and IT industry in Sri Lanka the Honorary Fellowship of the Computer Society of Sri Lanka was conferred on him in 2003.

In recognition of his signal contribution to the growth, connectivity, and use of the Internet in Sri Lanka, and for pioneering LEARN - the first IP WAN (Internet Protocol Wide Area Network) in Sri Lanka Induruwa was inducted to the Internet Hall of Fame 2014, an honorary lifetime achievement award administered by the Internet Society. Recognising his significant contribution to the development of networking and Internet in Sri Lanka Induruwa was honoured by the Internet Society Sri Lanka Chapter with an Internet Pioneers Award at the celebration of 20 years of Internet in Sri Lanka in June 2015. For his exceptional contribution to the digital arena Prof Induruwa received a Lifetime Achievement Award from Sri Lanka Telecom in June 2017. In October 2019, at the 30th anniversary celebrations of LEARN, he received the LEARN Founder Award for proposing in 1989 the conceptual design for an academic and research network in Sri Lanka, and implementing the same between 1990 and 1995, finally connecting to the Internet in 1996.

The British Computer Society Sri Lanka section honoured Prof Induruwa by awarding the NBQSA National ICT Lifetime Achievement Award in October 2024 in recognition and appreciation of the yeomen services rendered for the development of the ICT industry in Sri Lanka.

Prof Induruwa is the founding honorary treasurer of the British Computer Society Specialist Group in Cybercrime Forensics which was founded in 2008. He served in this capacity for 10 years until 2018. He served on the Internet Hall of Fame Advisory Board from 2016 until 2018. From 2016 to 2019 he served as a Member of the General Assembly of the European Cybercrime Education and Training Group (ECTEG) of the Europol. In 2018 he served as an Expert on Cybercrime to the United Nations Office on Drugs and Crime (UNODC) on their Education for Justice (E4J) project. In 2019 he served as an Expert to the Belgian Federal Science Policy Office (BelSPO) to evaluate project proposals under BRAIN-BE 2.0 (Belgian Research Action Through Interdisciplinary Networks).

== Life Time Achievement Awards ==
2003 - Honorary Fellow of the Computer Society of Sri Lanka recognizing the distinguished services to the ICT education and ICT profession in Sri Lanka

2014 - Internet Hall of Fame Lifetime Achievement Award of the Internet Society (ISOC) for pioneering IP networking and Internet in Sri Lanka

2015 - Internet Pioneers Award of the Internet Society-Sri Lanka (ISOC-LK) Chapter celebrating 20 years of Internet in Sri Lanka, for pioneering LEARN, the academic and research Internet in Sri Lanka

2017 - Sri Lanka Telecom Zero-One Lifetime Achievement Award for exceptional contribution to the digital arena

2019 - LEARN Founder Award for proposing, designing and implementing academic and research networking, and pioneering Internet in Sri Lanka

2024 - NBQSA National ICT Lifetime Achievement Award of the British Computer Society Sri Lanka section in recognition and appreciation of the yeoman services rendered for the development of the ICT industry in Sri Lanka

== Recent published work ==
- "Hybrid Intrusion Detection System for Smart Home Applications" (Chapter 12) in Developing and Monitoring Smart Environments for Intelligent Cities (Edited by Zaigham Mahmood), IGI Global, October 2020.
- "Snapshot of Internet in Sri Lanka around 2020" in Asia Internet History - Fourth Decade (2011-2020) (Edited by Kilnam Chon), Published in April 2021.
- "COVID-19 track & trace apps and their data governance issues" in Asia Internet History - Fourth Decade (2011-2020) (Edited by Kilnam Chon), Published in April 2021.
- "Security Vulnerabilities of Popular Smart Home Appliances", Conf. Proc. ICN 2021: The Twentieth International Conference on Networks, IARIA NexComm 2021 Congress, 18–21 April 2021, Porto, Portugal

== Keynotes and public lectures ==
- "Smart Technologies for the Sustainable Development of Environment", Keynote Address to the IEEE India Council organised by its Sustainable Development Activities Committee, 25 July 2025.
- "Engineering the future of Agriculture: Using IoT to achieve UN Sustainable Development Goals", Address to the World Engineering Day 2022 organised by the Institution of Engineers Sri Lanka (IESL), 4 March 2022.
- "LEARN: Its Journey from 1989", Keynote address at the 30th Anniversary of Lanka Experimental Academic & Research Network (LEARN), 7 October 2019, Colombo, Sri Lanka.
- "Emerging Cyberspace Challenges and the Role of Cyber-intelligence", Opening keynote address at the inauguration of the 12th International Research Conference of the General Sir John Kotelawala Defence University (KDU), 11 September 2019, Ratmalana, Sri Lanka.
- "Realising the Internet of Things (IoT): Can we afford to miss the opportunity?", Plenary keynote address at the 12th International Research Conference of the General Sir John Kotelawala Defence University (KDU), 11 September 2019, Ratmalana, Sri Lanka. ("KDU Computer Science Plenary Keynote Speech - 2019 on Youtube". YouTube. 11 September 2019.)
- "Computer Science & Smart Currencies", Plenary Keynote address at the 11th International Research Conference of the General Sir John Kotelawala Defence University (KDU), 14 September 2018, Ratmalana, Sri Lanka. ("KDU Computer Science Plenary Keynote Speech - 2018 on Youtube". YouTube. 16 October 2018.)
- "Sri Lanka 3CENTRE - A National Initiative for Capacity Building in Cybercrime Forensics, Cybersecurity & Cyber Intelligence", Keynote Speech delivered at the Cyber Security Industry Forum, 31 May 2017, Colombo, Sri Lanka.
- "Internet - the Next Wave of Disruption: Opportunities and Threats", Keynote Speech delivered at the 34th National IT Conference (NITC 2016) of the Computer Society of Sri Lanka, 9–10 August 2016, Colombo, Sri Lanka.
- "Internet of Everything: How secure should it be?", Keynote Speech delivered at the 2015 IEEE International Conference on Research in Computational Intelligence and Communication Networks ("ICRCICN 2015". Archived from the original on 24 November 2015.), 20–22 November 2015, Kolkata, India.
- "A (brief) Moment in Internet History", Address delivered at the 20 Years of Internet in Sri Lanka, 8 June 2015, Colombo, Sri Lanka.
- "Making and Breaking the Internet", Guest Speaker at the "Engineers Australia WA" (PDF)., 18 December 2014, Perth, Australia.
- "Distributed Computation: Its impact on Network Security and Forensics", Keynote Speech delivered at the 2014 IEEE International Conference on Computational Intelligence and Communication Networks, 14–16 November 2014, Kolkata, India.
- "ICT for Inclusive Development of Sri Lanka beyond 2020", Keynote Speech delivered at the 32nd National IT Conference of the Computer Society of Sri Lanka, 26–27 August 2014, Colombo, Sri Lanka.
- "Intelligent Future", Seventh Annual Professor V K Samaranayake Memorial Oration delivered at the University of Colombo School of Computing, 23 July 2014, Colombo, Sri Lanka.
- "The Internet: Where is it taking us?", Presentation at the felicitation ceremony organized by the Internet Society, Sri Lanka Chapter". DiGIT Magazine. 16 April 2014.
- "The Dark Side of the Internet", Presentation at the public lecture sponsored by the Computer Society of Sri Lanka in collaboration with the Internet Society, Sri Lanka Chapter". DiGIT Magazine. 19 September 2013.
- "Hidden in the Clouds: Impact on Data Security and Forensic Investigation", Keynote Speech delivered at the International Conference on ICT for Emerging Regions, 1–2 September 2011, Colombo, Sri Lanka.
- "Cyberwar - How Real is the Threat?", Keynote Speech delivered at the 29th National IT Conference of the Computer Society of Sri Lanka, 24–25 August 2011, Colombo, Sri Lanka.

== Interviews ==
- "History of ICT in Sri Lanka as told by Prof Abhaya Induruwa". Video Produced by the ICT History of Sri Lanka Project. 2016.
- "History of ICT in Sri Lanka - Interview with Prof Abhaya Induruwa". Interview scripted by the ICT History of Sri Lanka Project. 2016.
- Schafer, Valérie (15 March 2017). "Tell us about ... Internet Histories - Memories and Testimonies". Internet Histories. 1 (1–2): 188–196. doi:10.1080/24701475.2017.1301132. S2CID 157820948.
- "ඔබේ ස්මාර්ට් ජංගම දුරකථනය තුල ඔබ කෙතරම් සුරක්ෂිතද? (සංහිඳ සජීවී විකාශණය) - (How secure are you when you use your Smart Mobile Phone on the Internet? - 'Sanhinda' Live Broadcast)". 'Nuga Sevana' Programme of the Sri Lanka Rupavahini Corporation. 4 August 2016.
- "Prof Abhaya Induruwa: In-depth interviews at ISOC Hall of Fame 2014". Imagining the Internet Center at Elon University, North Carolina. 7 April 2014.
- "Interview with Prof Abhaya Induruwa, Father of Internet in Sri Lanka". DiGIT Magazine. 24 April 2014.
- "2014 Historic Profile Series: Abhaya Induruwa". Internet Hall Fame. 3 June 2014.
- "Interview with Prof Abhaya Induruwa, on Induction to the Internet Hall of Fame". DiGIT Magazine. 8 April 2014.
- "We cannot escape from the technological pull by the developed world - Prof Abhaya Induruwa" (PDF). Business Today. July 1999.

== Sources ==
- "Sri Lanka celebrates 20 years of Internet". Daily FT. 23 June 2015.
- "Moratuwa University Computer Science Dept. turns 25". Sunday Observer. 7 February 2010. Archived from the original on 16 October 2012.
- "CSE'2003 Conference Program". University of Moratuwa. 28 June 2003. Archived from the original on 7 August 2011.
- Interview with Prof Abhaya Induruwa, Father of Internet in Sri Lanka
