= EUCIP =

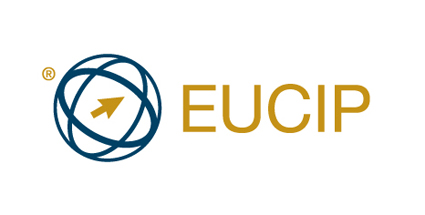
EUCIP logo

The European Certification of Informatics Professionals (EUCIP) is a professional certification and competency development scheme, aimed at informatics professionals and practitioners. EUCIP, which originated with the Council of European Professional Informatics Societies, is offered in a range of European countries through national computer societies. The EUCIP certifications are maintained by ECDL Foundation.

== History of EUCIP ==
The evolution of EUCIP stems from a series of earlier projects in the area of IT competence. These include the EISS (European Informatics Skills Structures) and EICL (European Informatics Continuous Learning) (circa 1995–1999), EPIC (European Professional Informatics Certificate) in 2000, which aimed at providing a basic level of IT professional certification, followed by EPICS (European Professional Informatics Certificate Service) in 2001–2003, which saw the development of what was soon to become the EUCIP Core syllabus.

This EPICS activity involved input from several European Subject Matter Experts. In addition, the EPICS project applied for financial support from the EU, through the TEN-telecom program. As a result of this funding, a market validation project took place to prepare a business plan for a limited market in six European countries.

The name was changed to EUCIP in late 2001 and a EUCIP central organisation was created as part of CEPIS. An initial meeting of early adopters was held in Athens in January 2002 and the work of creating the EUCIP product (based on the initial activities from the EPICS) began. During 2002, a test base was developed and extensive piloting activities took place in Italy, Finland, Norway, UK, Estonia and Germany. Later in the year, the working groups which had been involved in designing the product were transformed into a more structured form and EUCIP moved into office space in the BCS (British Computer Society) headquarters in Swindon. The first official tests took place in Italy in July 2003, in the University "G. d'Annunzio" of Chieti-Pescara (coordinated by Prof. Antonio Teti), soon followed by Norway. During 2004 CEPIS decided to hand over operation and maintenance support for EUCIP to ECDL Foundation. The involvement of ECDL Foundation has led to further revision to the EUCIP programmes.

== Candidates ==
The EUCIP certification is available in 8 European countries with testing being administered in competence centres in each these countries for a fee. ECDL Foundation markets the EUCIP programme to practitioners working in industry, government and public organisations. EUCIP aims to create a pan-European skills standard for ICT Professionals, helps to close the IT skills gap, enhance worker mobility, and increases the labour market value of certified practitioners.

== EUCIP Core ==
According to ECDL Foundation, the EUCIP Core provides students with a solid foundation for all types of ICT related work. To achieve a EUCIP certification, the candidate must successfully pass a test in all three knowledge areas. These are:

A) Plan Area: The Use and Management of Information Systems

This area refers to requirements analysis and planning in the use of ICT within an organisation. It is therefore directly concerned with management processes and defining requirements within a strategic perspective.

B) Build Area: Development and Integration of Information Systems

This area includes processes for specification, development and testing, and maintenance of Information Systems. It deals with methodological and technological issues related to development processes.

C) Operate Area: Operation and Support of Information Systems

This area concerns installation, supervision and maintenance of ICT systems. Essential topics include: hardware and software concepts, management of networks, service delivery and support, and security.

== EUCIP Professional ==
EUCIP Professional demands advanced competence in a particular role. The professional level is based on a specialised competence that a candidate may earn by working through a variety of educational modules and by gaining practical experience. There are 21 professional profiles to choose from:

- IS Analyst
- Business Analyst
- Software Developer
- Network Manager
- Enterprise Solutions Consultant
- X-Systems Engineer
- Database Manager
- Data Centre & Configuration Manager
- IS Project Manager
- IS Manager
- IS Auditor
- Logistics & Automation Consultant
- Sales & Application Consultant
- Client Manager
- IT Systems Architect
- Help Desk Supervisor
- Web & Multimedia Master
- Systems Integration & Testing Engineer
- Telecommunications Architect
- Security Advisor
- IT Trainer

== EUCIP IT Administrator ==
IT Administrator is a standalone certification programme that certifies practical and theoretical knowledge of computer technicians. The certification covers a wide range of Hardware, Software and Networks knowledge areas. Syllabus 3.0 consists of the following modules:

- PC Hardware
- Operating Systems
- Networks
- IT Security

In addition, ECDL Foundation has developed a EUCIP IT Administrator - Fundamentals module that provides a broad understanding of hardware, operating systems, networks and IT Security.
