= Engineering Council of South Africa =

Statutory body for engineering profession in South Africa

The Engineering Council of South Africa (ECSA) is the statutory body for engineering profession in South Africa. Its functions are to accredit the engineering programs and to register the engineering professionals in specified categories throughout the country.

== Overview ==
It was established in terms of the Engineering Profession Act 2000 (Act No. 46 of 2000), although its history dates to the South African Council for Professional Engineers (SACPE) in 1969.

== Professional Titles ==
The council regulates the practice of engineering, including titles as follows:

- Professional Engineer (Pr Eng)
- Professional Engineering Technologist (Pr Tech Eng)
- Professional Certificated Engineer (Pr Cert Eng)
- Professional Engineering Technician (Pr Eng Techni)

== Identification of Work ==
The council has been working towards a regulated industry for several years and is going towards implementation by 25 March 2024. The Identification of Engineering Work (IDoEW). The regulation did have several challenges in the past including the Competition Commission.

The regulations have their inceptions back in 2000, section 26(4), which already start limiting the practice to be performed under a registered person. Later editions were made in August 2006 to outline clear prohibitions under section 3. The prohibition was communicated in October 2013, section 5.2, by ECSA. Offences and penalties are outlined in the Engineering Profession Act 2000 (Act No. 46 of 2000) section 41. The implementation process started in March 2021 with a 3 year implementation period; all the engineering practitioners need to be registered by March 2024.

The CEO of the Council for the Built Environment, Dr Msizi Myeza has issued a response also in this regard, "illegal for the non-registered persons to administer and lead infrastructure projects in South Africa". The letter is broad as it goes beyond ECSA and includes all other disciplines within the environment.

== Finances ==
The current financial surplus increased from 92.5 million to 112.6 million and then was followed by the cash reserves which also increased from 75.3 million to 90.9 million from 2022 to 2023.

== Accreditation ==
Signatories of the following international education agreements have agreed to recognize educational programs that are accredited by ECSA:

- Washington Accord (since 1999) and recognition of BEng Degree Programs.
- Sydney Accord (since 2001) and recognition of BTech Degree Programs.
- Dublin Accord (since 2002) and recognition of National Diploma Programs.

The accreditation of honours in combination of masters programs are in progress and currently no honours & masters degrees have been accredited.

== See also ==
- Eastern Province Society of Engineers
