= ITNOW =

British computing magazine

ITNOW (formerly The Computer Bulletin) is a bimonthly magazine aimed at IT professionals that is published on behalf of the British Computer Society (BCS) and sent to all its members. The magazine was started with the title The Computer Bulletin in London in 1957. It is published by Oxford University Press for the BCS.
