= BCS Hong Kong Section =

Organisation of Information Technologists

BCS (Hong Kong Section)
- Founded: 1991
- Type: Professional Organisation & Local Section of the British Computer Society
- Purpose: Information and Communications Technology
- Region served: Hong Kong
- Members: about 1000
- Website: www.bcs.org.hk

The BCS (Hong Kong Section) is an organization of Information Technologists. It was founded in 1991 to create a platform to unite and communicate with its members in Hong Kong, and to create a professional presence for the BCS Headquarters. The Parent body BCS is the industry body for IT professionals and a Chartered Institute for Information Technology. Throughout the years, the Hong Kong Section has organized many activities for the members and also actively participated in both public and invited consultation of IT related matters initiated by the Government in Hong Kong. Currently, there are about 1,000 members attached to the Section.

== Affiliations ==
- BCS, The Chartered Institute of IT
