= Configuration Management Specialist Group =

UK professional body

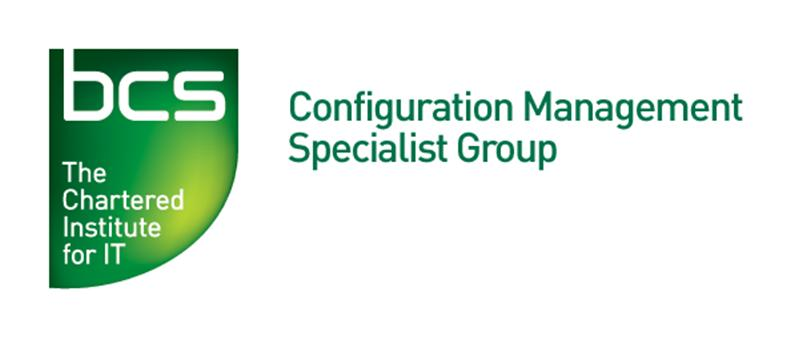
The logo of the BCS Configuration Management Specialist Group

The Configuration Management Specialist Group (CMSG) is a Specialist Group (SG) of the British Computer Society (BCS) a professional body, registered charity (incorporated by Royal Charter in 1984) and a learned society representing those working in Information Technology both in the United Kingdom and internationally. The CMSG was set up in 1995 and conforms to the rules for BCS Member Groups. Its original aim was to provide a forum for the promotion of Configuration Management as a discrete management process. Its remit now extends across configuration, IT asset, change and release management with the aim being to provide an accessible resource of expertise based on experience, exchange, education, professional development and promoting industrial standards. Its key strength is facilitating the open exchange of experiences and ideas across configuration, IT asset, change and release management both between members and sources of expertise in the wider community.

The group organises a number of regular and ad-hoc events and meetings each year to cover relevant topics and provide for discussion and debate on configuration management topics for its members. Events that the group has run include 2 day residential conferences, and joint events with the itSMF and other industry bodies.

Conference proceedings have been published and have influenced books such as Configuration Management: Expert Guidance for IT Service Managers and Practitioners. The CMSG also works with other BCS Specialist Groups and Branches to share knowledge and experience.

The CMSG has influenced national and international standards through Shirley Lacy (former Chair and committee member) who is the ITIL V3 Service Transition co-author, and project mentor for the ITIL 2011 Update. Shirley has also presented for the group together with other ITIL Authors. Another member of the committee, Rory Canavan sits on the working group of ISO/IEC addressing standards in IT Asset Management (ITAM) and Software Asset Management (SAM)

There is a strong subgroup with regular networking events for software asset management (SAM). Meetings are held every two months, and attendance is typically 80+ people. A report on one of these meetings entitled The Five Constants of IT Asset Management and delivered by the CMSG's treasurer, Kylie Fowler was published in The Register. The CMSG's 10th annual conference was held at the BCS's London Offices in June 2015 and the next SAM conference entitled Info Sec - Intersections and Interactions will take place in Manchester on 14 April 2016. Abstracts and available presentations from the June 2015 conference can be found here.
