= Dublin Accord =

International agreement on qualifications

The Dublin Accord is an agreement for the international recognition of Engineering Technician qualifications.

In May 2002, the national engineering organisations of Ireland, the United Kingdom, South Africa and Canada signed an agreement mutually recognising the qualifications which underpin the granting of Engineering Technician titles in the four countries. Operation of the Dublin Accord is similar as for the Washington Accord and Sydney Accord.

== Signatories ==
Signatories With Full Participation Rights:
| Flag | State | Member Institution | Year of Admission |
|---|---|---|---|
| (Australia) | Australia | Engineers Australia | 2013 |
| (Canada) | Canada | Technology Professionals Canada | 2023 |
| (Republic of Ireland) | Ireland | Engineers Ireland | 2002 |
| (Malaysia) | Malaysia | Board of Engineers Malaysia | 2018 |
| (New Zealand) | New Zealand | Engineering New Zealand | 2013 |
| (South Africa) | South Africa | Engineering Council of South Africa | 2002 |
| (South Korea) | South Korea | Accreditation Board for Engineering Education of Korea | 2013 |
| (United Kingdom) | United Kingdom | Engineering Council United Kingdom | 2002 |
| (United States) | United States | Accreditation Board for Engineering and Technology, Inc. (ABET) | 2013 |

Former Signatories:
| Flag | State | Member Institution | Years Recognized |
|---|---|---|---|
| (Canada) | Canada | Canadian Council of Technicians and Technologists | 2002-2022 |

== See also ==
- Seoul Accord - computing and information technology
- Outcome-based education
- Chartered Engineer
- Professional Engineer
