= British Computer Society Young Professionals Group =

The British Computer Society Young Professionals Group (YPG) was formed in 1986 (although its roots date back to around 1983) to provide representation and support to younger members of the IT profession. Today, the group is one of the largest and arguably one of the most influential young professional groups in the UK, with over 26,000 members. The group organises events and provides services ranging from lectures and debates to networking evenings, various competitions, college bursaries, and awards.

While support is provided from the British Computer Society, the group's leadership is run primarily by volunteers from the younger membership of the British Computer Society, which form the YPG's executive committee and network of regional representatives.

== Young IT Practitioner of the Year ==
The YPG judges, promotes and awards the Young IT Practitioner of the Year Award along with naming the annual British Computer Society Medal Winners. This underlines one of the YPG's key roles: to nurture and applaud individual ingenuity and entrepreneurial success that have made the British IT industry a leading global player. The awards mark the vital contribution made by young people to the IT profession.

Former winners of the award

- 2010 — Meri Williams, Procter & Gamble
- 2009 — Jacques Erasmus, Prevx
- 2008 — Sarah Christie, Procter & Gamble
- 2007 — Travers Powell, Vocalink
- 2006 — Saqib Shaikh, Microsoft Corporation
- 2005 — Andrew McAnulla, BTL Group Ltd
- 2004 — Karen Elizabeth Petrie, NASA
- 2003 — James Bailey, Eclipse Internet

Former medal winners

2010

- Adam Thompson, IBM UK Ltd
- Dominic Green, Microsoft

2009

- Luke Claughton, Micheldever Tyre Services Ltd
- Riyaz Patel, Yorkshire Water

2008

- Victoria O'Reilly, Allianz Insurance plc
- Luke Robison, IBM UK Ltd

2007

- Kate Scott, Premier Inn - Whitbread Group plc
- Chris Dale, IBM UK Ltd.

2006

- Paul Cheek, TeamSpirit Software Ltd
- Mark Alexander, Graham Technology Plc
- Iain McGinniss, Graham Technology Plc

2005

- Verity Wiscarson, IBM UK Ltd.
- Graham Marwick, IBM UK Ltd.
- Steven Henderson, Royal Bank of Scotland Group

2004

- Nicolas Eggleton, The Pensions Trust
- Lee Englestone, AstraZeneca
- Keith Sutcliffe, Steptronik UK

2003

- Richard Clayton, B Mason & Sons
- Steven Henderson, Royal Bank of Scotland Group
- David Hewitt, James Hamilton Group

== SkillCentre ==
The YPG runs an event series called 'YPG SkillCentre'. These events tend to help attendees still in the earlier stages of their career explore and develop skill areas that are typically untaught and/or neglected in the IT industry, such as advice on body language and tips on how to negotiate a pay rise. The series, established by YPG Chairman Andrew Brown in 2003, has since trained hundreds of IT professionals.

Past events have included popular speakers such as the author of The Naked Leader, David Tayor, Chris Croft, and Craig Goldblatt.

== ProNetworking ==
ProNetworking is an event series established by YPG Chairman Christopher Moxon in 2006 as an expansion of the YPG SkillCentre event series. It comprises events in two parts, offering attendees the opportunity to network while the second part brings together a top panel of IT professionals to share their secrets of success with the audience.

== YPG OneTeam ==
YPG OneTeam was a project run by the YPG to consolidate the YPG's representation efforts at national and local levels.

== WorkLink ==
Worklink was an online interactive database that allowed students to search for IT work placements. Notable employers using the service included, Buckingham Palace.

== History of the group ==
The YPG was originally established by students from Thames Polytechnic (now the University of Greenwich) in 1984. By 1985, the group had over 250 members and in 1986 on 23 April the YPG's Constitution was ratified and the group held its inaugural conference organised by Barbara McManus.

Historical listing of Chairs of the YPG

2016–present	Haiyan Wu
2011–2016	Tom Crick
2010–2011	Ben Pygall
2007–2009	Jennifer Hewitt
2005–2007	Christopher Moxon
2005	Kay Gamble
2003–2005	Andrew S. Brown
2002–2003	James Hickson
1998–2002	Edward Wolton
1997–1998	Richard Neighbour
1996–1997	Angus Marshall
1992–1993	Nick Young
1991–1992	Alex Durkin
1990–1991	Brid Seery
1989–1990	Greg O'Hare
1988–1998	Paul Edge
1986–988	Nick Carroll
1985	Tim McNally

== See also ==
- Young professional
