= Computer Society of Sri Lanka =

Sri Lankan professional body and learned society

- Founded: 1976
- Founder: DR. R. B. Ekanayake
- Type: Professional Organisation
- Purpose: Information and Communications Technology
- Location(s): OPA Professional Center, Colombo; Sri Lanka
- Region served: Sri Lanka
- Method: Conferences and Publications
- Key people: Damith Hettihewa, President
- Website: www.cssl.lk

The Computer Society of Sri Lanka (CSSL) is a professional body and learned society that represents those working in information technology (IT) and computer science in Sri Lanka. It was founded in 1976 and incorporated in 1986 under the Companies Act, No. 17 of 1982.

== Governance ==
The CSSL is governed by an executive council that consists of a President, Vice President, Secretary, Treasurer, Assistant Secretary, Assistant Treasurer, Student Counselor, Publication Secretary and several committee members. The executive council is elected at the annual general meeting of the society.

== Grades of membership ==
CSSL has different grades of membership:

- Honorary Fellow Members
- Members (MCS)
- Associate Members
- Student Members
- Affiliate Members

== Projects organised by the CSSL ==
The CSSL organises regular events for the benefit of the ICT community of Sri Lanka, and key among them are the following projects;

- National IT Conference (NITC)
- National Schools' Software Competition (NSSC)
- IT MasterMind National Schools' Quiz Competition
- IT Blast / Membership Night, a Dinner Dance for the ICT Fraternity
- CSSL Awards – An Annual Award Ceremony where key individuals and contributors are awarded and recognised.

== Affiliations ==
- Information and Communication Technology Agency of Sri Lanka (ICTA)
- International Computer Driving Licence (ICDL)
- South East Asian Regional Computer Confederation (SEARCC)
- Organisation for Professional Associations of Sri Lanka (OPA)
- Australian Computer Society
