= Frank Zhigang Wang =

Chinese computer scientist

Frank Zhigang Wang (Chinese: 王志刚) is a Chinese computer scientist and Professor of Future Computing at the University of Kent, England. He was previously Head of the School of Computing at the University of Kent.

Wang received his PhD in the UK in 1999. He was previously the Chair Professor and the Director of the Centre for Grid Computing, Cambridge-Cranfield High Performance Computing Facility (CCHPCF). In 1994, he invented spin-tunneling random access memory with Tohoku University, Japan. In 2003, Wang proposed a new concept of Grid-oriented Storage architecture. In 2004, Wang and his colleagues launched the UK-first Masters Program in Grid Computing. In 2005, he was elected as the Chairman of UK & Republic of Ireland Chapter of the IEEE Computer Society. In 2007, he was elected as a Fellow of the British Computer Society.
