= Australian Computer Society =

Association for information and communications technology professionals

- Founded: 1966; 60 years ago
- Type: Professional organisation
- Region served: Australia
- Method: Publications, conferences, technical councils, industry standards, certification and training, scholarships
- Members: 35,000+
- Key people: Helen McHugh (President); Josh Griggs (CEO)
- Website: acs.org.au

The Australian Computer Society (ACS) is an association for information and communications technology professionals with claimed 40,000+ members Australia-wide but not audited. According to its Constitution, its objectives are "to advance professional excellence in information technology" and "to promote the development of Australian information and communications technology resources".

The ACS was formed on 1 January 1966 from five state based societies. It was formally incorporated in the Australian Capital Territory on 3 October 1967. Since 1983 there have been chapters in every state and territory.

The ACS is a member of the Australian Council of Professions ("Professions Australia"), the peak body for professional associations in Australia. Internationally, ACS is a member of the International Professional Practice Partnership (IP3), South East Asia Regional Computer Confederation, International Federation for Information Processing and the Seoul Accord.

The ACS is also a member organisation of the Federation of Enterprise Architecture Professional Organizations (FEAPO), a worldwide association of professional organisations which have come together to provide a forum to standardise, professionalise, and otherwise advance the discipline of Enterprise Architecture.

== Activities ==
The ACS operates various chapters, annual conferences, Special Interest Groups, and a professional development program. Members are required to comply with a Code of Ethics and a Code of Professional Conduct.

== Extent of representation ==
The ACS describes itself as "the professional association for Australia's technology sector" and "Australia's primary representative body for the ICT workforce", but industry analysts have questioned this based on the small percentage of IT professionals who are ACS members. The issue has been discussed in the press since at least 2004, and in 2013 the Sydney Morning Herald wrote that "the ACS aggressively seeks to control the important software engineering profession in Australia, but ... less than 5 per cent of the professional IT workforce belongs to the ACS." The ACS Foundation came up with a slightly higher figure: "Depending on the data used to calculate the number of ICT professionals in Australia, however, [ACS] membership represents approximately 6.5 per cent of the total."

== Presidents ==
The Australian Computer Society elects its National President every two years, who serves as the leader of the Society. Some of the most recent presidents include:

- Nick Tate, 2022–2023
- Ian Opperman, 2020–2021
- Yohan Ramasundarah, 2018–2019
- Anthony Wong, 2016–2017
- Brenda Aynsley, 2014–2016
- Nick Tate, 2012–2014
- Kumar Parakala, 2008–2010
- Philip Argy, 2006–2008
- Edward Mandla, 2004–2006

== Publications ==
Information Age is the official publication of the ACS. In February 2015 Information Age became an online-only publication. Peer-reviewed research publications of the ACS include:

- Australian Computer Journal
- Journal of Research and Practice in Information Technology
- Conferences in Research and Practice in Information Technology
- Australasian Journal of Information Systems

The digital library contains free journal articles and conference papers.

== Education and Certification ==
The ACS also certifies IT professionals at two levels, the Certified Professional and the Certified Technologist. Each certification level has a minimum level of experience and also required ongoing CPD (Certified Professional Development) hours of learning each year. In 2017 the ACS launched a cybersecurity specialisation within the certification framework.
