= EQANIE =

German non-profit

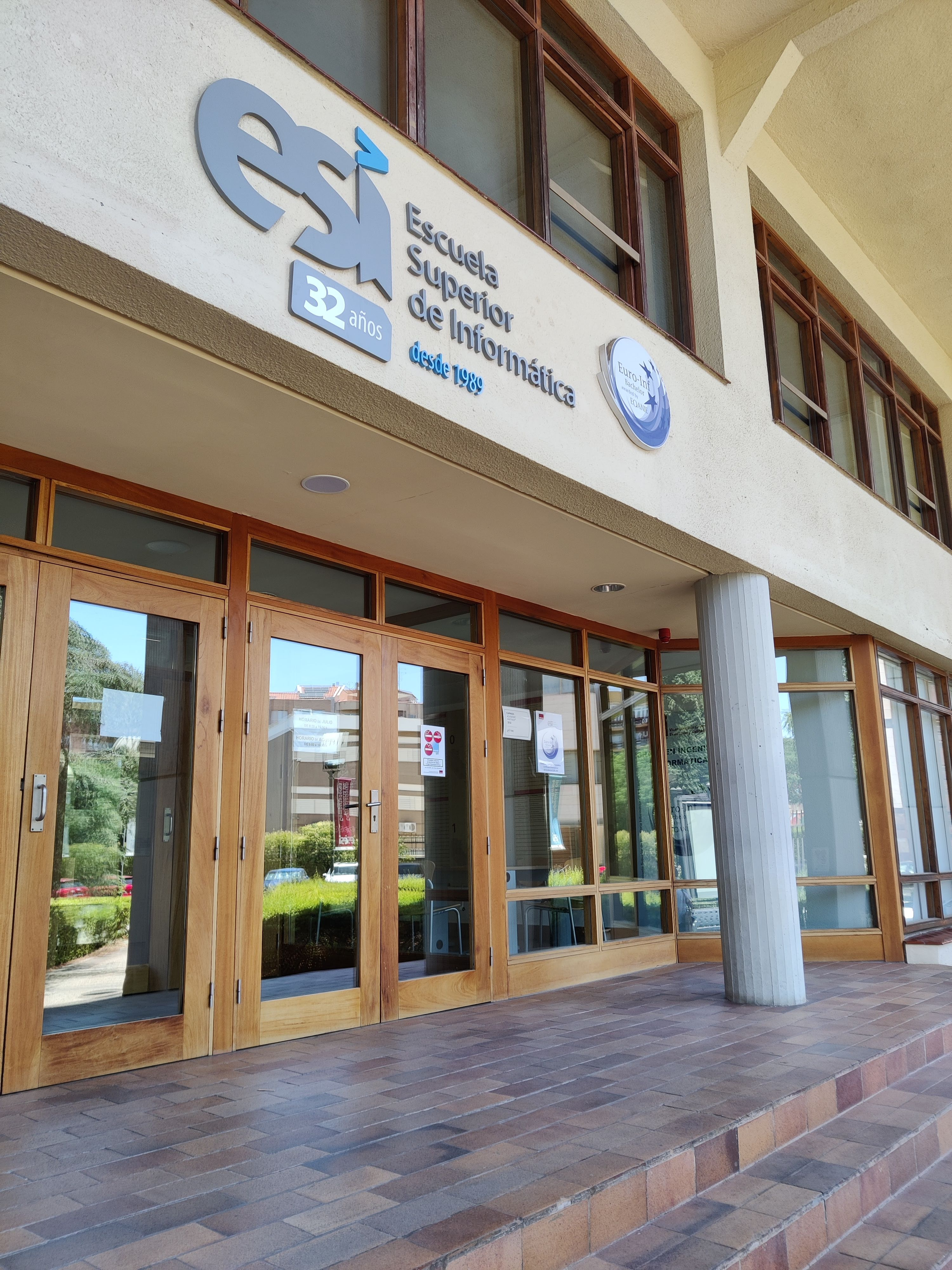
Euro-Inf Quality Label promotion

EQANIE (European Quality Assurance Network for Informatics Education e.V.) is a non-profit association seeking to enhance evaluation and quality assurance of informatics study programmes and education in Europe. It was founded on January 9, 2009 in Düsseldorf, Germany. EQANIE develops criteria and procedures for the evaluation and quality assurance in informatics study programmes and education. EQANIE awards the so-called Euro-Inf Quality Label to degree programmes that comply with the Euro-Inf Framework Standards and Accreditation Criteria. As of 2021, informatics study programmes from 21 different countries have been accredited.

== Background ==
EQANIE’s founding is to be seen against the background of the Bologna Process, aiming at the creation of a European Higher Education Area. The association emanated from the informal network of stakeholders involved in the Euro-Inf Project co-financed by the European Union under the Socrates-Programme from 2006 until 2008. The Euro-Inf consortium comprised the German Accreditation Agency ASIIN, Hamburg UAS, the University of Paderborn and the Council of European Professional Informatics Societies (CEPIS). The project consortium established and tested the so-called Euro-Inf Framework Standards and Accreditation Criteria for Informatics Programmes in Europe. The rights of ownership and copyright on the assessment tools developed by the Euro-Inf Project are held by EQANIE.

Main objectives of EQANIE in the area of accreditation and quality assessment are:

- Improving the quality of educational programmes in informatics;
- providing the Euro-Inf Quality Label for accredited educational programmes in informatics;
- facilitating mutual transnational recognition by programme validation and certification;
- facilitating recognition by the competent authorities, in accord with the EU directives and other agreements;
- increasing mobility of graduates as recommended by the Lisbon Strategy

The key principle of Euro-Inf accreditation is that all graduates of a Euro-Inf accredited degree should have undertaken a defined set of learning activities and should have achieved a broadly defined set of learning outcomes. The Framework represents a quality threshold; those degree programmes that have demonstrated compliance are awarded the Euro-Inf Bachelor / Euro-Inf Master Label.

== The Accreditation Process ==
An Institution wishing to have one or more of its degrees accredited has to select between two different paths:

- The institution may submit an application to the General Secretary of EQANIE that includes a self-assessment report, compiled in accordance with the Euro-Inf guidelines, a matrix showing how the modules that make up each degree programme satisfy the Eur-Inf expected Learning Outcomes, and supporting documentation that includes the module descriptors, short CV's of academic staff, etc. An audit team studies the documentation and visits the institution. After the visit, the Secretariat prepares a report which is sent to the Institution to be checked for factual accuracy. The auditors then submit their assessment to the Accreditation Committee which decides on the outcome. For a positive decision, the degree is added to the list of accredited degrees on the EQANIE website ( www.eqanie.eu).
- EQANIE has also appointed three national agencies the authority to award the Euro-Inf labels on its behalf, namely ASIIN in Germany, BCS in the UK, and ANECA in Spain.

== Structure ==
The General Assembly is the highest decision-making body of EQANIE. It is composed of one delegate per EQANIE member-organization. The General Assembly meets at least once a year.

The Executive Board is appointed by the General Assembly for a period of three years. Members of the Executive Board may be re-elected once. After Prof. Dr. Hans-Ulrich Heiß, Prof. Dr. Eduardo Vendrell and Prof. Dr. Liz Bacon, Prof. Dr. Maria-Ribera Sancho is currently the President of EQANIE.
