= International Certification of Digital Literacy =

Computer literacy certification programme by ECDL Foundation

Logo ICDL

International Certification of Digital Literacy (ICDL), formerly known as European Computer Driving Licence (ECDL), is a digital literacy certification program provided by ICDL Foundation, a not-for-profit organisation. The ICDL / ECDL certification is a globally recognised information and communication technology (ICT) and digital literacy qualification.

In 1995 the ECDL certification programme was developed through a task force of the Council of European Professional Informatics Societies (CEPIS) and was recommended by the European Commission High Level Group, ESDIS, to be a Europe-wide certification scheme. The task force compared several national certification schemes and chose the CDL from Finland as the basis for piloting and later adoption into the ECDL.

== Contents ==
Though the ICDL does not refer to Microsoft or its Office software suite by name in the official course syllabus, training occurs almost exclusively with Microsoft's products as they are ubiquitous in the business world. Users can also be introduced to Google Applications.

For the Base certificate, there are no pre-requisites regarding computer use.

=== Levels ===
The ICDL Base certificate comprises all four of these modules:

- basic operation of a computer (with Microsoft Windows or Ubuntu in some editions)
- basic operation of the internet
- basic use of Microsoft Word or LibreOffice Writer
- basic use of Microsoft Excel or LibreOffice Calc

The ICDL Standard certificate involves the aforementioned Base module, and three of the following modules:

- databases (with Microsoft Access or LibreOffice Base)
- creating and using presentations (Microsoft PowerPoint)
- collaborating online (mostly Microsoft Teams)
- IT security
- editing images (with Photoshop or GIMP)

The ICDL Advanced certificate comprises one of the following modules; the ICDL Expert certificate three of the following modules:

- advanced use of Microsoft Word
- advanced use of Microsoft Excel
- advanced use of Microsoft Access
- advanced use of Microsoft PowerPoint

== Testing ==
In order to take the tests, a candidate buys an ECDL Skills Card, which usually is issued electronically and serves as a login to the testing platform. To prepare for a module test, the candidate may use ECDL diagnostic tests. Testing is done using software which simulates the Windows/Microsoft Office environment. The candidate's mouse movements and keystrokes are monitored and the result of the test is reported immediately after the test is completed.

== Value ==
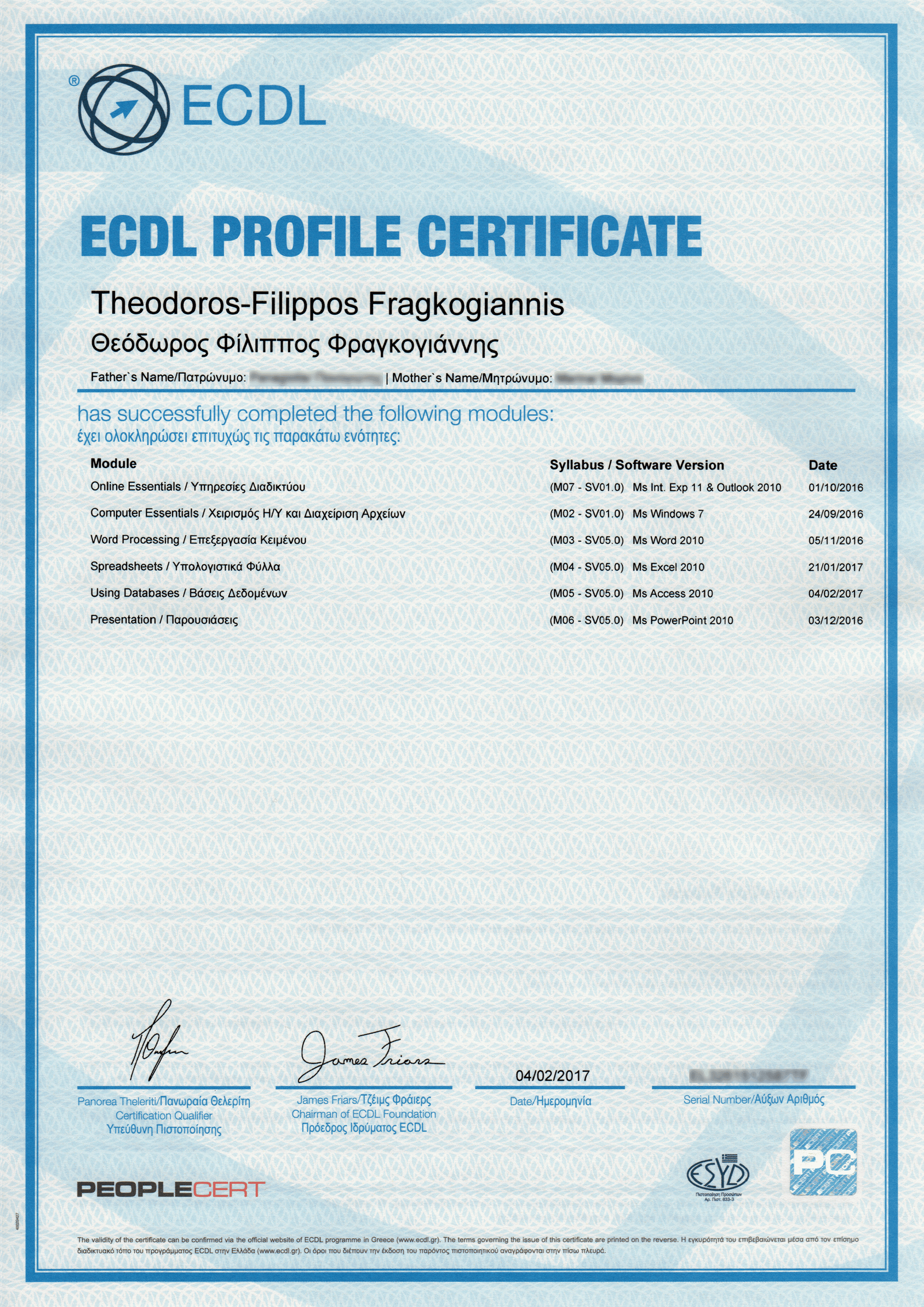
ECDL Profile certification issued in Greece in February 2017.

In professions like publishing, graphic and web design, science or information technology, a completed ICDL course is not a desired quality however as the work requires specialist skills and experience with other software.
