= Alan Reay (engineer) =

New Zealand structural engineer

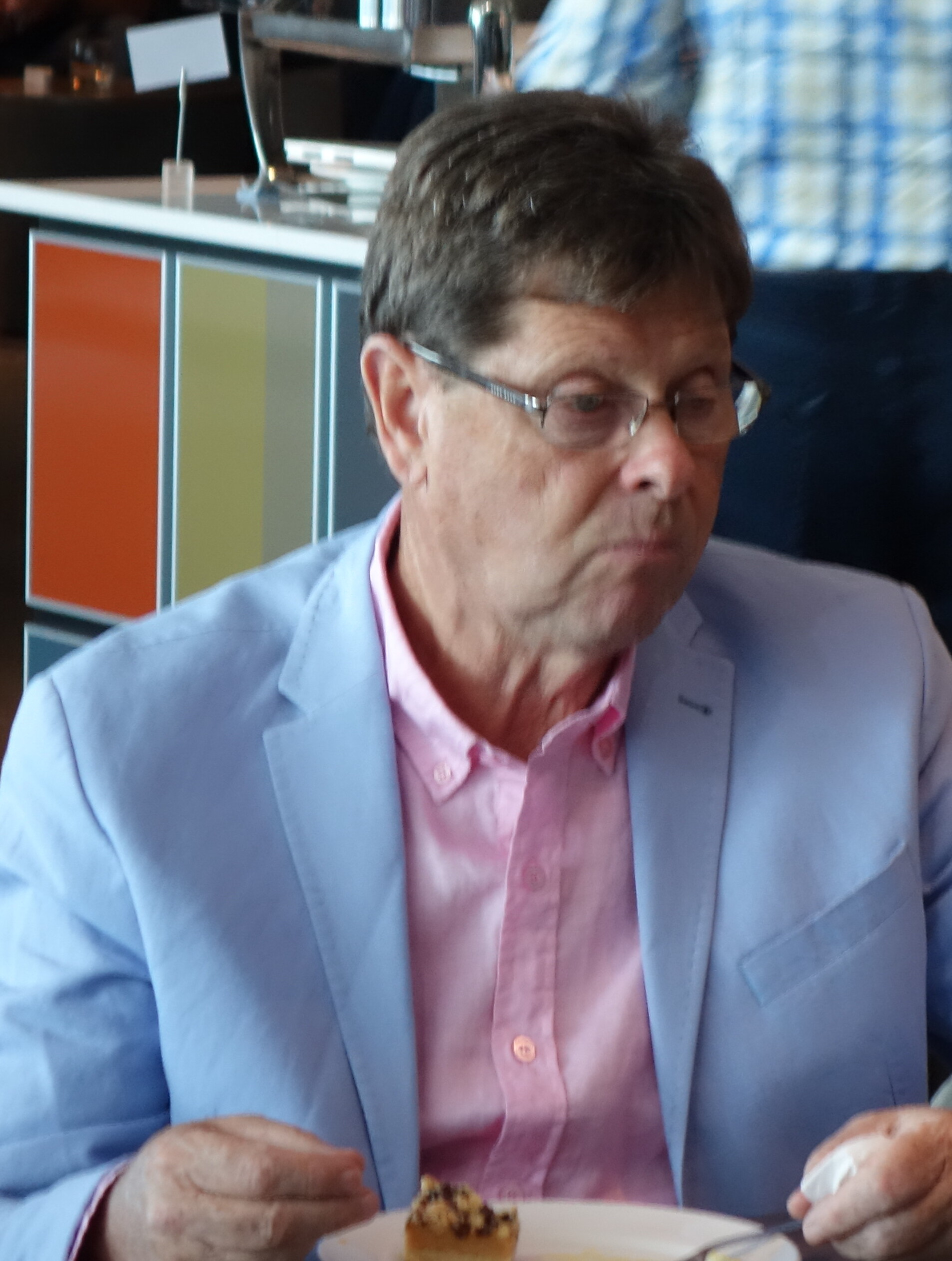
- Reay in 2014
- Born: Alan Michael Reay; 1941 (age 84–85)
- Education: University of Canterbury (BEng, PhD)
- Occupation: Structural engineer
- Years active: 1970–late 2010s

Alan Michael Reay (born 1941) is a New Zealand structural and civil engineer with a career spanning over 45 years. Reay received his doctorate in civil engineering in 1970, and began working for Hardie & Anderson on inner-city buildings in Christchurch. In 1971, he started his consulting firm, Alan Reay Consulting Engineer (ARCE), which became Alan Reay Consultants Limited (ARCL) in 1988. Reay has worked on a variety of large projects including office towers and apartment buildings, and was known in the 1980s for low-rise tilt-slab buildings. In the 1990s, he was the first non-American to be awarded the engineering achievement award by the Tilt-Up Concrete Association of America. In 2002, Reay was elected a Fellow of IPENZ.

Reay's engineering firm, for which he was the sole principal and structural engineer, was responsible for designing the CTV Building in Christchurch. The building failed in the 2011 Christchurch earthquakes and was the deadliest single incident in the disaster, resulting in the deaths of 115 people. Reay was investigated in a publicised inquiry; he was found responsible for breaching standards and ethics on the CTV Building project, by both a royal inquiry and Engineering New Zealand, and fined the maximum penalty in accordance with 1986 regulations. It was also found that Reay had interfered in the building permit process, persuading council engineers that their reservations were unfounded. Reay has vehemently denied responsibility for the collapse of the CTV Building and attempted to appeal the decision, placing much of the responsibility on David Harding, an employee who designed the building. An investigation to bring manslaughter charges against both Harding and Reay was dropped due to a lack of evidence.

Reay started a new firm in 2012, which was renamed to Engenium in 2013, where he continued engineering work. His conduct was again the subject of criticism in 2015, when the foundation work Engenium had undertaken for Green Lane West apartments had to be redesigned. Reay believed he was used as a scapegoat due to his troubled reputation, and retired from engineering work in the late 2010s. As of 2026, he has maintained his role as director of Engenium.

== Early and personal life ==
Alan Michael Reay was born in late 1941. Reay has been based in Christchurch for much of his life. His first marriage ended in 1974; he is married to his current wife, Barbara.

Reay attended the University of Canterbury in the 1960s, receiving a Bachelor of Engineering with First Class Honours in 1965, and a Doctor of Philosophy in Civil Engineering in 1970. Reay's PhD thesis was on the dynamic characteristics of civil engineering structures.

In the 2020s, Reay was retired from engineering work and was reportedly suffering from ill-health. He remains at Engenium as director.

== Career ==
=== Early career (1970–1972) ===
Reay registered as an engineer in 1970 and became a member of IPENZ in November that year. He began his career working as a structural engineer for consultancy Hardie & Anderson, a role he held for two years. During his time at the consultancy, he worked on tower structures including a six-storey building on Liverpool Street.

In 1971, Reay founded ARCE, his own consultancy firm. The business was initially unincorporated and he worked as the sole engineer, but he later hired additional staff, including structural engineer David Harding who was first employed by Reay in 1978.

In the early 1970s, Reay lectured at the University of Canterbury on steel structures.

=== Engineering consultancy (1972–1987) ===
Reay worked as a consulting engineer through his company ARCE (Alan Reay Consulting Engineer) throughout the 1970s and 1980s. Some of his significant early projects include Kamahi Towers on Carlton Mill Road (an eight-storey concrete apartment block) and the eight-storey Ibis House on Hereford Street. Reay also worked on retail and industrial buildings, including Smith City Market in 1977, working as the consulting engineer on the Moorhouse Mazda building in 1983, and leading the project team for the expansion of the Christchurch Carpet Yarns building in 1986. During the 1980s, Reay also became notable for his work engineering low-rise, tilt-slab buildings. He designed the Bisley Industries building using the technique, which was considered an advance and novel approach at the time.

Reay acted as the sole principal and structural engineer during this time, and the firm had no more than 5 full-time employees at any one time. Others who worked at the consultancy included Harding, who worked as a structural engineer, and three draughtsmen, Terry Horn, Wayne Strachan, and Shane Fairmaid. Harding left ARCE in 1980, and his role was taken over by John Henry. Henry left in 1985 and Harding returned, taking over his projects and negotiating a 20% pay increase.

In the mid-1980s, Reay's firm worked on more high-rise projects during the inner-city boom in Christchurch, and was involved in the redevelopment of Christchurch Hospital. In 1986, the firm took on the CTV Building project, a six-storey office block on Madras Street for Prime West Corporation. The design was undertaken by Harding, with Reay as his boss, and two others, comprising a team of four. Reay was aware that the CTV Building would be Harding's first involvement in a structure of its scale, but had confidence in Harding, noting he had recently worked on the twelve-storey Westpark Towers and undertaken an intensive seminar on concrete structures. Reay was also confident in Harding's background and experience, however Harding was not experienced with multi-storey structures. Harding claims that the project was jointly designed by himself and Reay, and he would not have worked on it on his own; Reay disputes this, and claims the project was largely Harding's responsibility.

In 1987, Reay was the project manager and consulting engineer for the Bealey Park office development. That same year, Reay also designed the entertainment wing of The George Hotel. In 1988, Reay was the design engineer for the Noel Leeming head office, a two-storey structure on Montreal Street spanning 13,500 sq ft.

=== ARCL (1988–2011) ===
In 1988, Reay renamed his company ARCL (Alan Reay Consultants Limited) and formally registered it as a company. In the 1990s, Reay became the first non-American to receive the engineering achievement award by the Tilt-Up Concrete Association of America. Reay was also a consultant to New Zealand Wool Services International at some point during or after the 1990s.

In 1995, Reay was the engineering advisor in a commission inquiry investigating the collapse of a viewing platform at Cave Creek, an incident which killed 14.

On 25 March 2002, Reay was elected a Fellow of IPENZ.

ARCL ceased operations in the 2010s, following the CTV Building collapse, for which they were investigated. The company was dissolved and officially removed from the company registrar in 2021.

=== Engenium (2012–present) ===
In 2012, Reay founded Reay Consulting Group Limited. In 2013, Reay gave up his shares and directorship, and the company was renamed Engenium. However, Reay's wife retained a director role, and the majority of shares were held by his lawyers' trustee company. An investigation by Stuff noted the company retained the same premises, contact details, and many of the same directors. As of 2026, Reay is again the sole director of Engenium according to company records.

Reay practiced as an engineer for Engenium, most notably in 2015 as a main engineer for Green Lane West "urban village" apartments in Auckland. The project incurred expenses after the foundations had to be changed from the original design, which Engenium provided. There were also issues with the steel work, with materials provided by a company run by Bert Govan, a long-time associate of Reay. A number of contractors blamed Reay and the developer for expensive delays and issues on the project. In response, Reay said he was used as a scapegoat due to his troubled background.

Reay resigned his membership of Engineering New Zealand on 28 February 2014, in attempt to prevent Engineering New Zealand from investigating him. In the late 2010s, Reay retired from engineering work, but has continued to lead Engenium.

=== Other activities ===
Reay has been involved in a number of construction and property related companies including Tilt-Up Systems, Concrete Systems Limited, and as the director of Engineering Certifiers Limited, among other projects.

Reay is a member of the New Zealand Concrete Society, American Concrete Institute, and Tilt Up Concrete Association. He also had membership with the Association of Consulting Engineers New Zealand and New Zealand Society for Earthquake Engineers.

== CTV investigation and appeal ==
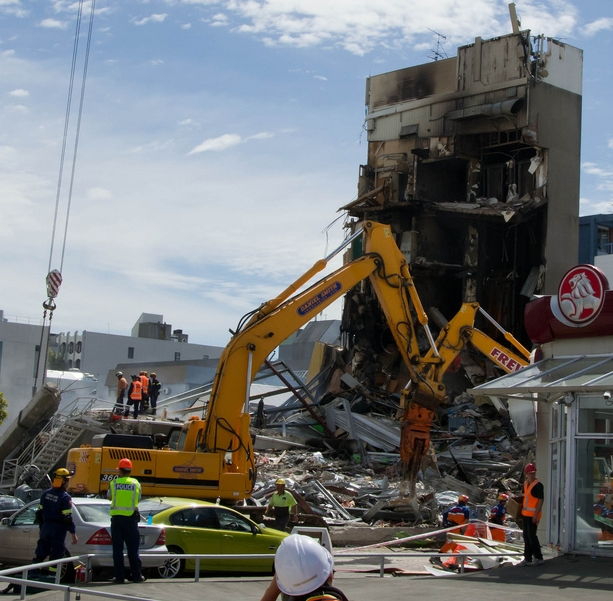
Ruins of the Canterbury Television (CTV) building, 24 February 2011

The CTV Building collapsed during the 2011 Christchurch earthquake, killing 115 people. It was the deadliest single incident in the disaster, accounting for most of the 185 fatalities.

In May 2011, Reay met with investigators Clark Hyland and Ashley Smith at the request of Hyland. Throughout 2011, Reay provided information to assist with the investigation. ARCL was provided the final report before it was released to media on 9 February 2012. A complaint was then raised against Reay in late 2012; it was dropped in 2014 after Reay gave up his membership with IPENZ, before being reopened in 2019 after intervention by the Attorney-General.

=== Investigation outcome ===
Multiple investigations have found that both Harding and Reay were jointly responsible for the failures in design of the CTV Building. An initial report suggested manslaughter charges against both Harding and Reay, but charges were eventually dropped due to a lack of evidence.

In 2012, the Canterbury Earthquakes Royal Commission found the CTV Building had design flaws and should not have been built. Harding was described as "inexperienced" and "working beyond his competence." It was stated that Reay had left Harding unsupervised and pressured city officials to approve the building design, despite several members having reservations. It was established that Reay knew the building was irregular and had a layout which risked excessive torsional response, but did not take proper steps to check the design, which was labelled "seriously deficient". As part of the investigation by police into whether criminal charges should be laid, independent reports into the building found the failure was attributed to "substandard design by Harding and insufficient oversight by Reay".

In 2024, Engineering New Zealand upheld a complaint that Reay failed to adequately supervise Harding in the design of the CTV Building, and breached the Code of Ethics and standards at the time, calling for him to make a public apology. They fined him NZ$750 and costs of $1000, the maximum penalty as per the rules in 1986. Reay had previously attempted to prevent the hearing into his conduct, and stated he would appeal, describing the process as a "witch hunt".

=== Appeal of judgement ===
Reay has apologised for the substandard quality of the building, but has vehemently denied the structural failure was his responsibility, largely attributing the engineering to Harding, who claims that Reay was jointly responsible for the design. Reay argued that he gave responsibility to Harding and was not closely overlooking his work, and that a high level of supervision was not standard in 1986. Engineering New Zealand rejected Reay's position, accepting that 1980s supervision standards were looser, but that Reay's supervision was "virtually non-existent". Family of the victims of the CTV Building collapse criticised Reay for his stance, believing he failed to take accountability. Reay claims he repeatedly offered to meet with the families, but Engineering New Zealand refused the offers.

Reay has argued the building was designed to withstand a seismic design live load for its intended use as an office; specifically, changes to seismic load were not considered when a school was added on a floor in 2001, and that there should have been an engineering review before approving change of use. Further, Reay argues that the particularly strong vertical force of the earthquake likely caused unexpected results compared to initial analysis, and that the near total destruction of the building prevented a more thorough examination of potential material failures and other factors unrelated to the design work. There were also other issues complicating the case, including that of construction supervisor Gerald Shirtcliff, who had stolen the identity of a retired engineer and faked his engineering degree.

In 2024, Reay appealed the decision by Engineering New Zealand and requested a judicial review. Reay's claims against the process by ENZ are still under review, however in January 2026, part of Reay's claim was rejected and both parties were admonished by Justice Jason McHerron for "wasting his time."
