= Sarah Wakes =

English New Zealand engineer and academic

- Awards: Fellow of the Institution of Professional Engineers New Zealand

Academic background
- Education: University of Nottingham
- Thesis: The development of a sand wave (1991)

Sarah Jane Wakes is an English-born New Zealand applied mathematician and engineer, and is a full professor at the University of Otago. She is the first woman to be head of the Department of Mathematics and Statistics at the university.

== Academic career ==
Wakes was born in England. Wakes completed a PhD titled The development of a sand wave at the University of Nottingham in 1991. Wakes was a chartered engineer and marine engineer in the UK, and through the UK Institute of Marine Engineering, Science and Technology is also a chartered engineer in New Zealand. Wakes joined the University of Otago in 2002, initially in the design department, then in applied sciences. Wakes has also been the director of the university's Clothing and Textile Sciences programme. In 2021 Wakes was appointed as the head of the Department of Mathematics and Statistics. She was the first woman to lead the department in the university's 150-year history. Wakes was appointed a full professor in 2024, and as of 2024 is a member of the university Senate.

Wakes is considered an expert on computational fluid dynamics, and has researched coastal management, engineering design and wind flow over geomorphology such as dunes. She is also interested in sedimentation effects. Wakes is part of a Plant & Food Research-led MBIE-funded project researching design of aquaculture structures for the open ocean. She also works on the sustainability of materials.

In 2022 Wakes was elected as a Fellow of Engineering New Zealand, in recognition of her contribution to engineering education.

== Selected works ==
- Sarah J. Wakes; Tanja Maegli; Katharine J. Dickinson; Mike J. Hilton (2010). "Numerical modelling of wind flow over a complex topography". Environmental Modelling & Software. 25 (2): 237–247. doi:10.1016/j.envsoft.2009.08.003. Wikidata Q56936554.
- Lauren M. Degenstein; Rachel H. McQueen; Lisa S. McNeill; Robert P. Hamlin; Wakes, Sarah Jane; Linda A. Dunn (2020). "Impact of physical condition on disposal and end‐of‐life extension of clothing". International Journal of Consumer Studies. 44 (6): 586–596. doi:10.1111/ijcs.12590. Wikidata Q125016489.
- Lisa S. McNeill; Robert P. Hamlin; Rachel H. McQueen; Lauren Degenstein; Wakes, Sarah Jane; Tony C. Garrett; Linda Dunn (2020). "Waste not want not: Behavioural intentions toward garment life extension practices, the role of damage, brand and cost on textile disposal". Journal of Cleaner Production. 260 121026. doi:10.1016/j.jclepro.2020.121026. Wikidata Q125016495.
- Andrew T. Hart; Hilton, Michael J.; Wakes, Sarah Jane; Dickinson, Katharine Josephine Mary (2012). "The Impact of Ammophila arenaria Foredune Development on Downwind Aerodynamics and Parabolic Dune Development". Journal of Coastal Research. 279: 112–122. doi:10.2112/jcoastres-d-10-00058.1. Wikidata Q56974724.
- Lisa S. McNeill; Robert P. Hamlin; Rachel H. McQueen; Lauren Degenstein; Tony C. Garrett; Linda Dunn; Wakes, Sarah Jane (2020). "Fashion sensitive young consumers and fashion garment repair: Emotional connections to garments as a sustainability strategy". International Journal of Consumer Studies. 44 (4): 361–368. doi:10.1111/ijcs.12572. Wikidata Q125016491.
- Wakes, Sarah Jane; A E Holdø; A J Meares (2002). "Experimental investigation of the effect orifice shape and fluid pressure has on high aspect ratio cross-sectional jet behaviour". Journal of Hazardous Materials. 89 (1): 1–27. doi:10.1016/s0304-3894(01)00307-7. PMID 11734343. Wikidata Q42043439.
- Wichai Pattanapol; Wakes, Sarah Jane; Hilton, Michael J.; Dickinson, Katharine Josephine Mary (26 August 2007), Modeling Of Surface Roughness For Flow Over A Complex Vegetated Surface, doi:10.5281/zenodo.1058657, Wikidata Q125198043
- Y. Jiao; C.R. Lloyd; S.J. Wakes (2012). "The relationship between total embodied energy and cost of commercial buildings". Energy and Buildings. 52: 20–27. doi:10.1016/j.enbuild.2012.05.028. Wikidata Q125198045.
