= CTV Building =

Former headquarters of Canterbury Television

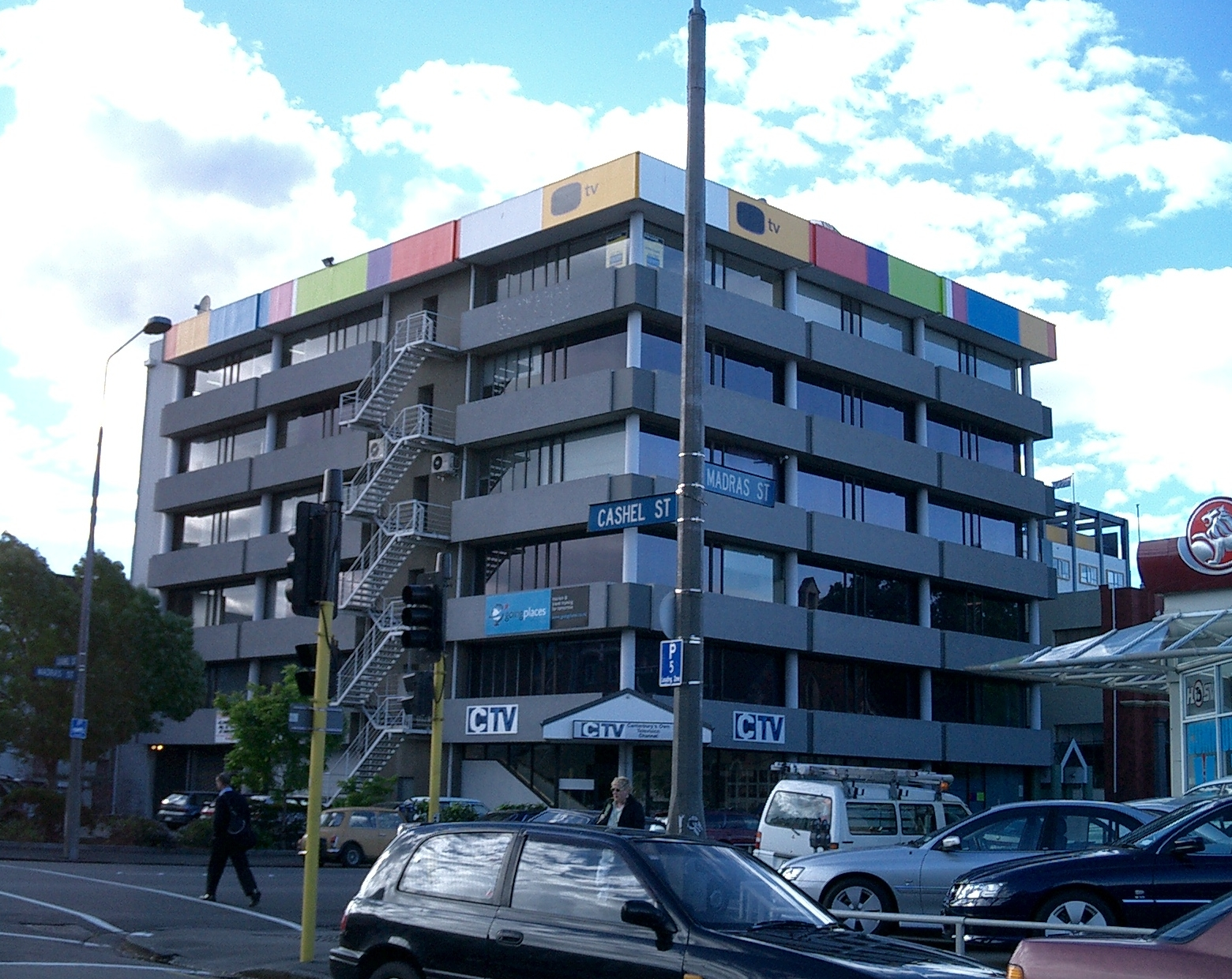
- The CTV Building in 2004

General information
- Type: Office building and a television station
- Location: Christchurch Central City, New Zealand, 243–245 Madras Street, Christchurch, New Zealand
- Coordinates: 43.5328°S 172.6424°E
- Construction started: 1986
- Completed: Around August 1987
- Destroyed: 22 February 2011
- Owner: Madras Equities

Technical details
- Floor count: 7

Design and construction
- Architecture firm: Alun Wilke Associates Architects
- Structural engineer: Alan Reay Consultants

The CTV Building was the headquarters of Canterbury Television (locally known as CTV) and other companies. Located on the corner of Cashel and Madras Streets in Christchurch Central City, New Zealand. It became one of the symbols of the February 2011 Christchurch earthquake after 115 people lost their lives when the building collapsed during the disaster; the deaths made up about 60% of the earthquake's total fatalities.

== History ==
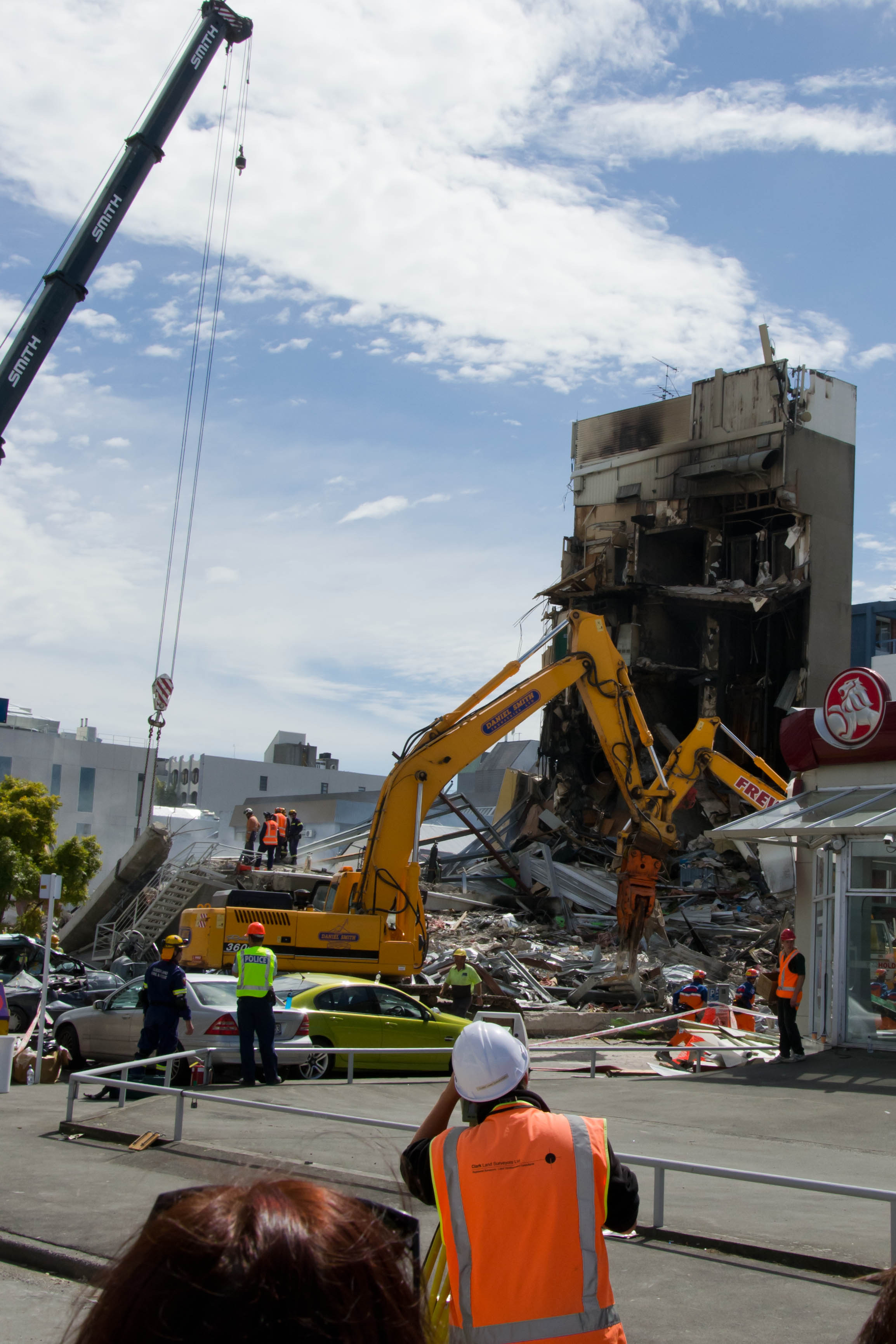
Ruins of the CTV Building, 24 February 2011

Work on the CTV Building began in 1986. Christchurch City Council gave building consent in September of that same year, and construction neared completion by August 1987.Building codes for earthquake design changed frequently in New Zealand following the 1931 Hawke's Bay earthquake (in 1935, 1965, 1976, 1984 and 1992). A significant change in design philosophy was the change from non-ductile design of a reinforced concrete structure to a ductile approach, where it is expected that building joints yield in design earthquake events, which might make a structure uninhabitable but without it collapsing. A new reinforced concrete standard emphasising ductility came into effect in New Zealand in 1982. Stefano Pampanin, an associate professor at the University of Canterbury who teaches in structural and seismic design, described the non-ductile philosophy as "an obsolete design based on the levels of knowledge and code provisions that existed before the mid-1980s". The structural design engineer was Alan Reay Consultants (named after the company's owner) and the architect was Alun Wilke Associates Architects, both of which are firms based in Christchurch.

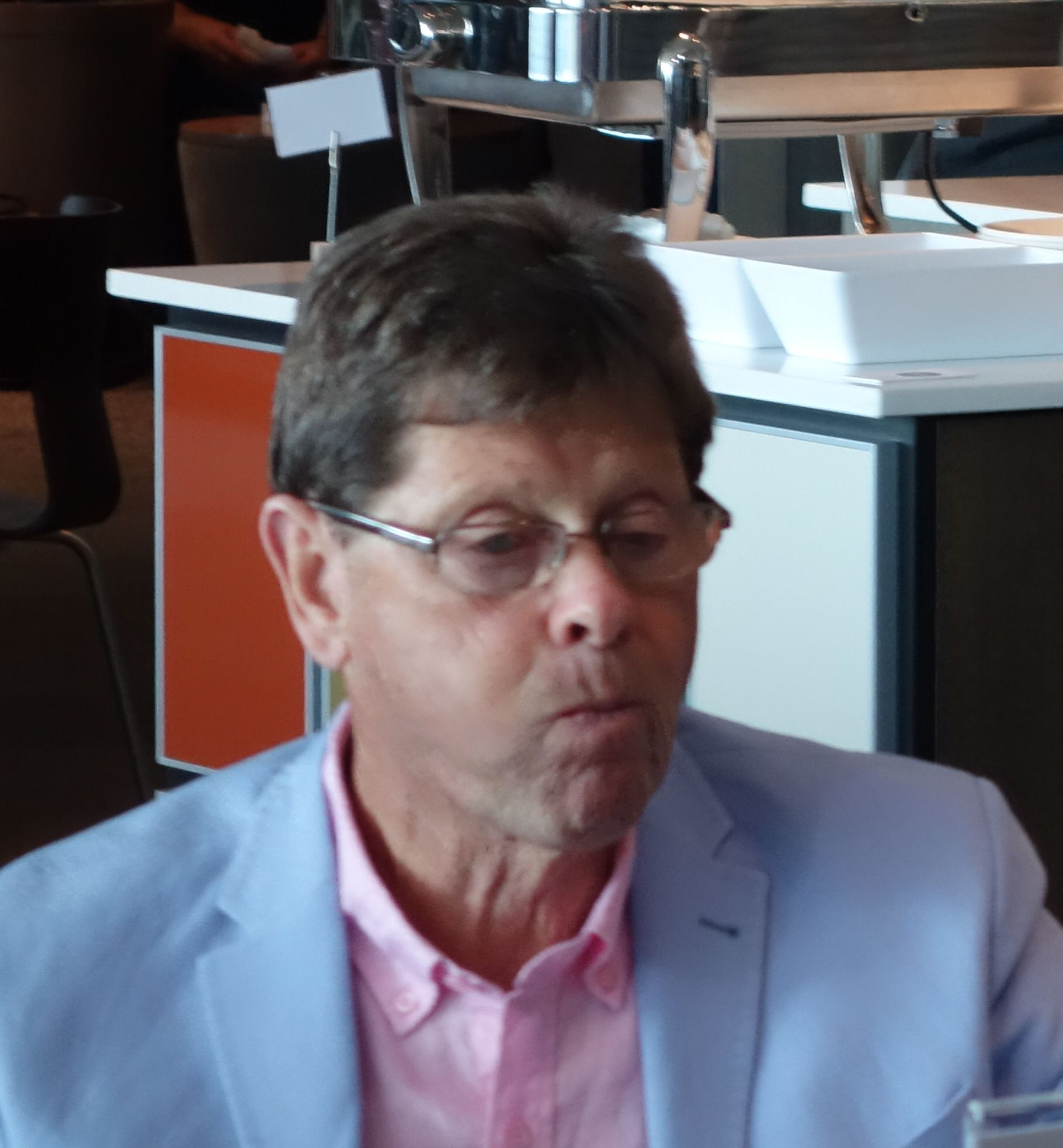
Alan Reay in 2014, whose company designed the CTV Building

The CTV Building was inspected by engineers after the 4 September 2010 Canterbury earthquake and after the 26 December 2010 4.9 magnitude aftershock. On both occasions, the building was declared safe, having suffered only superficial damage. The building collapsed in the 22 February 2011 earthquake and, due to its high death toll of over 100 people, has become one of the symbols of the earthquake.

The building was owned since 1991 by Madras Equities, a company owned by shareholders Russell Warren Ibbotson and Lionel Walter Hunter. Hunter lost a friend in the building and told a reporter if he had known that there was anything wrong with the building, "I would have pushed it over myself."

== Tenants ==
The building's main tenant was Canterbury Television and the company held the naming rights. CTV occupied the ground and first floors, Levels 1 & 2. The second floor, Level 3, was not tenanted during the quake. King's Education, an English-as-a-second-language school occupied the third floor, Level 4. The Clinic, a medical clinic, was on the fourth floor, Level 5; and the not-for-profit relationship counselling agency Relationship Services was on the fifth floor, Level 6. A nursing school was also located in the building.

== 2011 Christchurch earthquake ==
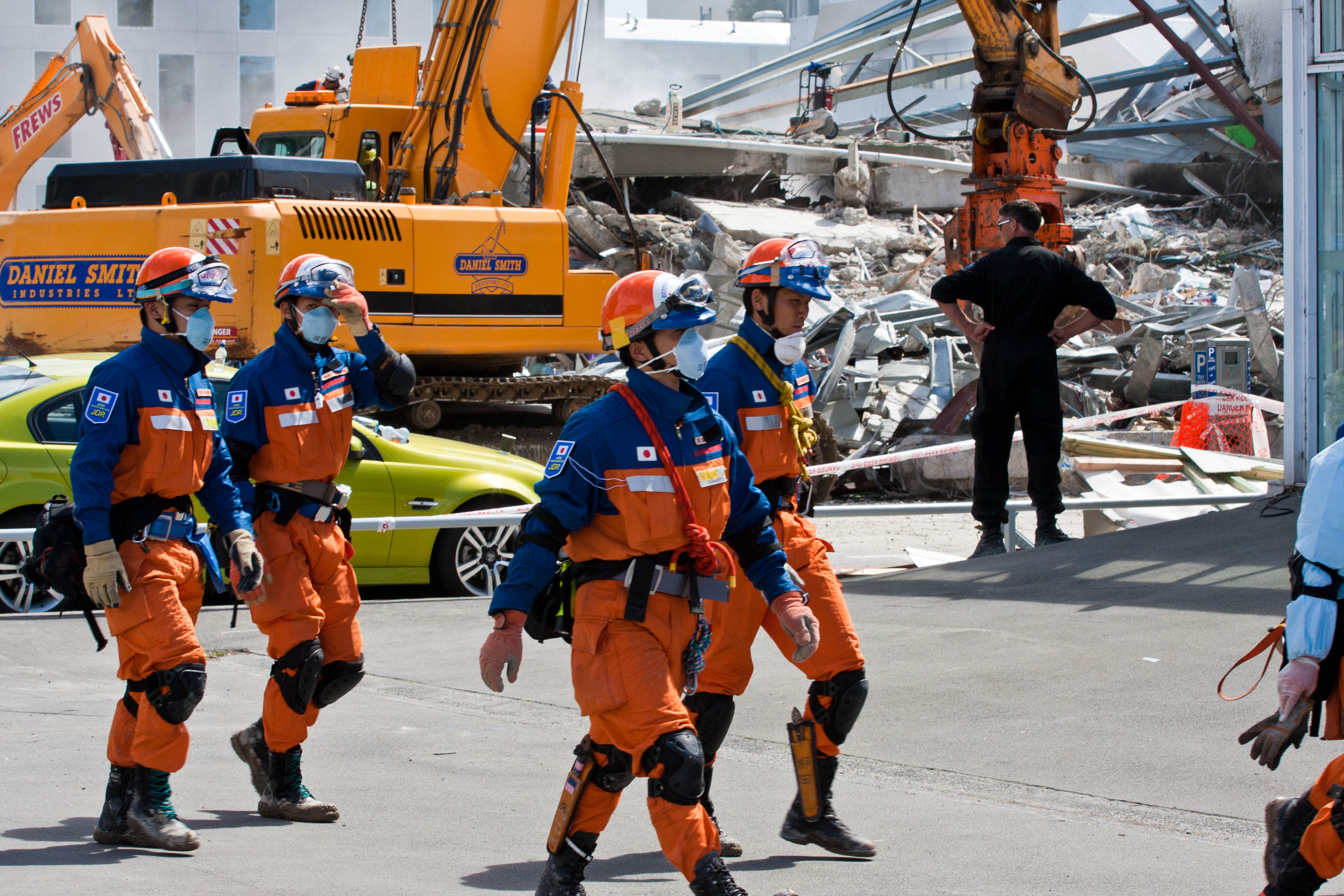
A Japanese urban search and rescue team at the ruins of the CTV Building

The building collapsed in the February 2011 Christchurch earthquake, with only the north shear wall that included the lift shaft left still standing. One survivor was quoted as running out of the ground floor during the shaking. When she had reached the other side of the 14-metre-wide (46 ft) road, she looked back and "the building was down." Within minutes, a fire broke out. Most of the deaths were caused by the collapse, but it is assumed that some of the victims suffered fatal burns, and some may have even drowned during the efforts of putting the fire out.

King's Education was an ESL school that was located on Level 4 of the CTV building. There were an estimated 87 regular students and 27 visiting students in the building at the time of the earthquake, as well as 17 staff members. Some people had already left the building for lunch when the earthquake struck. The loss of hard copy and server records in the earthquake complicated the school's attempts to contact students and next-of-kin; as a last resort, the school decided to post best-known student and staff status and location on the Internet in spite of privacy issues, in an effort to update friends and relatives and to find students who were not accounted for but who were not in the building at the time of its collapse. The disaster received particularly wide coverage in Japan due to 27 of the victims being Japanese.

The building collapse killed 115 persons, consisting of 16 Canterbury Television employees on Levels 1 & 2; 79 King's Education staff (4), teachers (5) and foreign students (70) on Level 4; 19 medical centre staff (13), patients (5) and one patient's friend on Level 5; and an Administrator for Relationship Services on Level 6. The bodies of four victims in the CTV building could not be identified because the high temperature of the building fire had destroyed any traces of DNA. The inquest into the CTV building deaths was adjourned in September 2011 and resumed in October 2012. This second inquest, continuing until December 2012, paid particular attention to six CTV building victims who were alive for some time but could not be rescued.

The follow-up report was completed and released in March 2014 by Coroner Gordon Matenga. Eight victims were identified as making cell phone contact following the building collapse, apparently all affiliated with the King's Education program located on Level 4. Two of the eight died from their injuries early on, but six of them were identified as being injured but alive until the early hours of the next day, when uncontrollable fire, smoke, and further collapse resulted in their deaths. The report is mainly for establishing time and cause of death but is 56 pages long and it includes detailed observations and conclusions from rescuers, administrators, survivors, and friends and family members of several victims, and it includes several recommendations for additional training.

Dozens of people survived the collapse of the building. At least 18 staff and patients from Relationship Services on the top level, Level 6, survived the building collapse. Nina Bishop, a Relationship Services administrator, was the only fatality on that level. CTV receptionist Maryanne Jackson was the only person to survive from the ground floor; she did so by running out of the building as the quake struck.

== Demolition and land ownership ==
In May 2011 the last remnants of the building, the lift shaft, were demolished. It was announced in July 2013 that the Crown had bought the land for the Eastern Frame, a new park proposed on the east side of the central city. The site was subsequently developed into a garden of remembrance with some elements of the original building foundations still visible.

== Royal Commission of Inquiry ==
The Royal Commission of Inquiry heard evidence into why the CTV Building collapsed during the 2011 earthquake from 25 June 2012, and was scheduled to run for eight weeks.

Witnesses before the Commission debated whether the building was code-compliant when it was built, and whether the engineers designing and approving the building had adequate experience. Consulting firm head Alan Reay stated that the building did not meet his own standards, and he thought the engineer he employed for the design, David Harding, had adequate experience. Harding had not designed buildings of more than two floors before. He said he relied on Reay for guidance, and that the developers wanted a minimum-cost design to (just) meet the code; no extra reinforcing was to be added or you "got your hand smacked".

Witness Arthur O’Leary, a structural engineer, said that a "critical eye" should have been cast over the building design. The "pioneering" structural design could have been beyond the experience of council staff to evaluate, though the "pioneering" design meant that non-compliant elements in the building columns were not obvious. Panel member Barry Davidson also disagreed with an "opportunistic and legalistic" interpretation of the code that found they were compliant.

In September 2012 it was discovered the man who supervised the building's construction had faked his engineering degree. Gerald Shirtcliff had stolen the identity of a retired engineer based in the UK, William Fisher. The pair had been friends in the 1960s, and Shirtcliff stole Fisher's degree by adopting his name. It was later discovered Shirtcliff's father had done most of the work on his master's in highway engineering.

The commission's findings were released on 10 December 2012. The report found the building's design was deficient and should not have been approved. The building's engineer, David Harding, of Alan Reay Consultants Ltd, was found to have no experience in designing multi-storey buildings and was "working beyond his competence." His supervisor, Alan Reay, left Harding unsupervised then pressured city officials to approve the building design even though several members had reservations about the design.

In November 2017 it was announced that the Police would not prosecute anyone who was involved in the building's construction. In late September 2024, the Engineering New Zealand Disciplinary Committee upheld a complaint against Reay for inadequately supervising the construction of the CTV Building. Reay has strongly rejected the decision and vowed to appeal it, describing the process as a "witch hunt."
