= Bernard Poulin (businessman) =

Canadian businessman

- Born: 1951 or 1952 (age 74–75)
- Education: Université de Sherbrooke
- Occupation: Businessman
- Known for: Founder and CEO, SM Group International

Bernard Poulin (born 1951/1952) is a Canadian businessman. He is best known as the president and CEO of the construction and engineering company SM Group International, which employs more than 1,200 people and is active in more than 39 countries, with US$11 billion in projects under management.

== Education ==
Bernard Poulin earned bachelor's and master's degrees in civil engineering from the Université de Sherbrooke in Canada. He completed the Harvard Business School Owner/President Management Program (OPM). In October 2010, New Jersey City University presented Poulin with an honorary doctorate.

== Career ==
In 1972, Poulin founded a construction company, Labo SM Inc, and was president and CEO for more than 40 years as it grew to be SM Group, a large international conglomerate.

He was on the board of overseers of Seton Hall University's John C. Whitehead School of Diplomacy and International Relations. He was a member of the advisory committee of the Association of Consulting Engineers of Quebec.

Poulin assisted New Jersey City University (NJCU) to form a partnership with the French company Dassault Systèmes S.A. and others to create opportunities for NJCU students; he was subsequently presented in 2010 with the university's Global Leadership Award.

Poulin was a member of the board of directors of the Fondation Hôpital Charles-LeMoyne, and the Jewish General Hospital of Montreal. In 2009, he co-chaired the first cyclo-challenge against cancer, which raised approximately US$6 million to benefit the Jewish General Hospital of Montreal, the Centre hospitalier universitaire de Québec (CHUQ) in Trois-Rivières.

Poulin co-founded the Musée des Beaux-Arts of Sherbrooke. He was a regional judge for the EY Entrepreneur of the Year award in Canada.

Poulin headed up the 2010-11 fundraising campaign for the "Youth Quebec Mission 2010-2013" project. He later became a major fund-raiser for the Union Montreal municipal political party. He was appointed to the Charbonneau Commission by Marc Lalonde.

=== SM Group International ===
SM Group International, formerly known as Labo SM Inc, was established in 1972 and is based in Montreal, Canada. Poulin is the company's president and CEO. SM Group International provides engineering, environmental, and project management services, and operates in about than 35 countries.

In Algeria, SM Group International operates as a subcontractor for the multinational Chinese CITIC Group, which won the contract to build one of the sections of the East-West Highway. The firm opened an office in Saudi Arabia, and created a consortium with a local company, Gulf Construction.

== Personal life ==
On January 28, 2022, Poulin plead guilty to using his employees to illegally donate to the Liberal and Conservative parties, and was fined $3,750. In response to the plea Quebec's Order of Engineers revoked his license to practice and levied a fine of $50,000.
