= Alan Reay =

Alan Reay may refer to:

- Alan Reay (British Army officer) (1925–2012), Director General Army Medical Services
- Alan Reay (engineer) (born 1941), New Zealand structural and civil engineer
