= Lawrence Lee =

British stained glass artist (1909–2011)

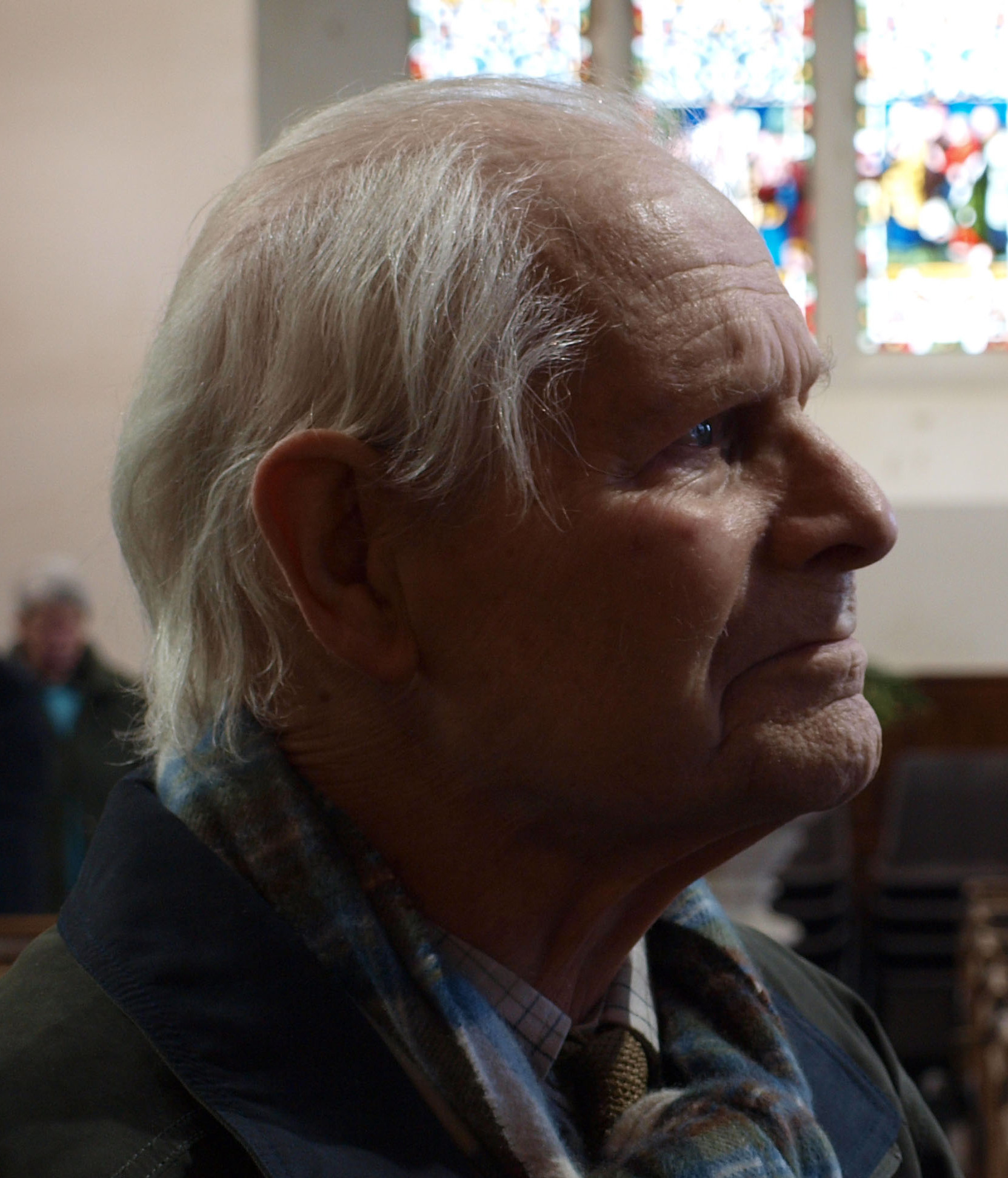
- Lawrence Lee, aged 100
- Born: Lawrence Stanley Lee; 18 September 1909; Chelsea, London, England
- Died: 25 April 2011 (aged 101)
- Education: Kingston School of Art, Royal College of Art
- Known for: Stained glass, painting, drawing
- Notable work: Windows in Coventry Cathedral, Southwark Cathedral and Guildford Cathedral
- Movement: Modern art
- Spouse: Dorothy Tucker
- Elected: Master of the Worshipful Company of Glaziers, 1976.

Lawrence Stanley Lee (18 September 1909 – 25 April 2011) was a British stained glass artist whose work spanned the latter half of the 20th century. He was best known for leading the project to create ten windows for the nave of the new Coventry Cathedral. His other work includes windows at Guildford and Southwark Cathedrals as well as a great number of works elsewhere in the UK, and some in Canada, Australia and New Zealand.

== Early life ==
Lee was born in Chelsea Hospital for Women on 18 September 1909. His family moved to Weybridge where his father, William, a chauffeur and engineer, had a garage near the Brooklands Race Track. Lawrence's mother, Rose, was deeply religious and it was this influence that gave him the appreciation of biblical symbolism that became an important feature of his work. His parents divorced and Lawrence moved with his mother to New Malden. At the local Methodist church he met Dorothy Tucker, later to become his wife.

He left school at 14, but won a scholarship to Kingston School of Art. A further award in 1927 enabled him to attend the Royal College of Art, where he studied stained glass under Martin Travers, graduating in 1930.

== Pre-war career ==
Lee's first job was as an assistant to Travers in his studio. For a while he joined James and Lilian Dring in an artistic co-operative. His works included a range of craft and art work produced at Southside Studios in Clapham, London. He also worked part-time teaching at Kingston and Bromley schools of art.

For a year prior to the outbreak of war, Lee joined the Anglican Franciscan Friary at Cerne Abbey, Dorset, but at the outbreak of war, abandoned monastic life to fight fascism.

== World War II ==
In the summer of 1940, Lee married Dorothy Tucker. Lee joined the Royal Army Medical Corps but transferred to the Royal Artillery, serving as an anti-aircraft gunner for a while. He was promoted from cadet to Second Lieutenant in June 1942. He subsequently served in North Africa and Italy, seeing action at the battle of the Kasserine Pass in Tunisia in February 1943 and in the Allied landings at Salerno later that year. He was transferred to the Army Educational Service in Italy in February 1945, maintaining his rank of Lieutenant, and ran courses in art and culture. He sketched and painted throughout the war, capturing an eruption of Mount Vesuvius whilst in Italy. The Imperial War Museum holds five watercolours of tanks and desert scenes, and, though some works were declined in 1942, a donation from James Dring was accepted and further works were subsequently purchased. Other work from this period is held in the Ashmolean Museum.

== Post-war ==
On leaving the army, Lee returned to Travers' commercial studio as a chief assistant alongside John E Crawford. Travers' services were in great demand restoring bomb-damaged church windows and furnishings. Work like this continued even into the 1960s such as Lee's window at Holy Trinity church in Attleborough, Warwickshire showing Christ in majesty with a wheel of life - a replacement for a Victorian window destroyed by bomb-damage.

When Travers died in 1948 Lee and Crawford shared his open commissions, prompting Lee to establish his own studio; firstly in Sutton, later in New Malden, and finally, in 1963, at Penshurst, Kent. Lee also succeeded Travers as the RCA's Head of Stained Glass, where he served until 1968.

Lee also paid homage to his military career making several contributions to the Royal Military Academy Chapel at Sandhurst. This includes about 26 windows by Lee installed over the years between 1954 and 1991. These include small heraldic windows commemorating the field marshals of the Second World War. Other work from the early 1950s includes four windows in the south wall of St Magnus-the-Martyr in the City of London. These depict St Magnus of Orkney, St Margaret of Antioch, St Thomas of Canterbury and St Michael - the latter dated 1954.

The majority of post-war commissions were conservatively traditional and influenced by the post-Victorian Arts and Crafts movement. At the RCA though, Lee could be more experimental. Whilst respecting the historic traditions of the craft, Lee was also interested in the new possibilities afforded by improvements in adhesives. He was also interested in all forms of glass including slab glass and the dalle de verre technique.

=== Coventry Cathedral ===
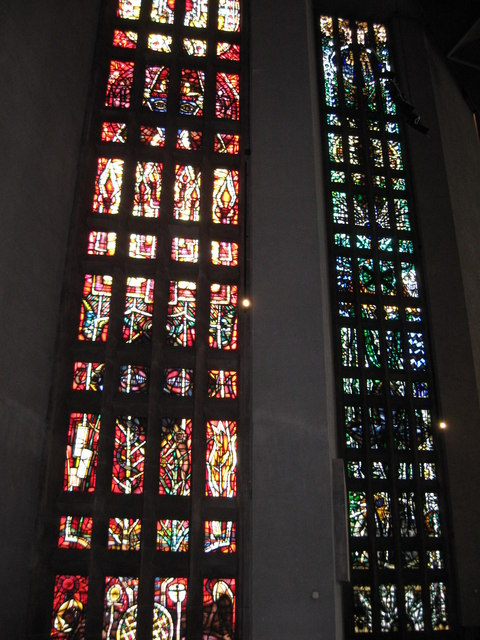
Lawrence Lee's windows in Coventry Cathedral

Sir Basil Spence was commissioned to design the replacement for Coventry Cathedral, destroyed during the war. Spence was determined that the stained glass should be an integral part of the design from the outset. About this time, Spence received an invitation from Lee to act as external examiner at the RCA. Spence was impressed by the experimental and abstract work he saw there. Spence abandoned his thoughts of inviting French artist Fernand Léger to bid for the Cathedral work and invited the College to tender instead. The college won the contract but the decision was controversial, seen by some as being unfair competition using cheap student labour.

Spence's design brief requested some Christian symbolism and the use of green, red, multi-coloured, purple and gold, to represent “Man’s progress from birth to death and from death to resurrection and transfiguration”. The artists were allowed to exercise their own interpretations beyond that. The requirement was for ten 70 feet (21 m) high lights which posed a significant technical challenge for Lee. He enlisted two former students; Geoffrey Clarke and Keith New, to collaborate on the designs. They worked individually on three each and together on the tenth, using the mural studio of the Victoria and Albert Museum adjacent to the RCA. They treated the windows as pairs, Lawrence designing the red and gold, symbolic of early manhood. Jane Gray, Lee's assistant at this time, also worked on the project with him. The whole project took six years. After four years, in 1960, the first six windows completed were assembled for the first time and exhibited at the Victoria and Albert Museum where they drew a lot of attention. They were then stored until the consecration of the cathedral in 1962. Coventry established Lawrence's reputation, and with it came greater acceptance of a more modern, abstract style which Lee was able to develop through the 1960s.

=== Other works ===
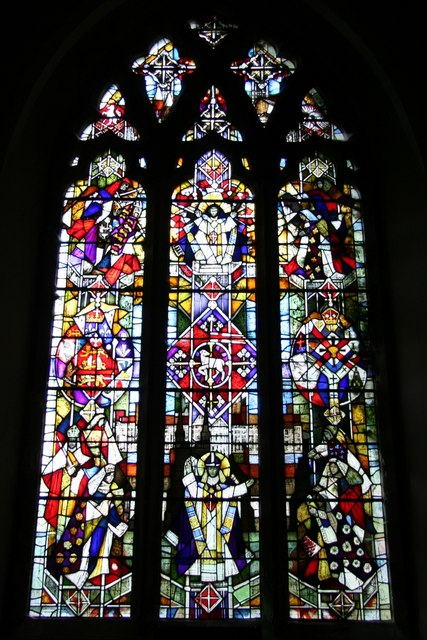
St John the Baptist's church, Penshurst, Kent

Whilst the Coventry project was in progress, Lee also worked on smaller commissions. Lee created three small windows for the Unitarian Church, Croydon in 1959. Lee's large three-light window in the retrochoir of Southwark Cathedral, completed in 1959, depicts a dove in the top light, the Virgin with the child Jesus carrying a set-square in the centre and, in the lower light, stonemasons, carpenters and a glazier on a ladder commemorating the donation of the widow by the family of Thomas Rider whose firm had rebuilt the cathedral's nave in 1895. The dove representing the Holy Spirit was a recurring theme in many of Lee's works. Lee's knowledge of bird anatomy assisted in this. Lee is alleged to have insisted to his RCA students that "doves representing the Holy Spirit should not resemble stuffed pigeons".

The success of Coventry led to another large commission for 10 clerestory windows for the Church of St Andrew and St Paul in Montreal, Quebec, Canada, in the early 1960s. Other commissions came from across the UK, as well as Canada, Australia and New Zealand. A few examples are of Lee's work through the following three decades are given below.

In 1967 Lee created an east window for St James Church, Abinger, Surrey, comprising three lights depicting a cross as a living tree, riven by lightning & distorted. Ian Nairn, architect and critic, described it as "much the best modern glass in the county".

Major refurbishment of headquarters of the Chemical Society (now the Royal Society of Chemistry), Burlington House, London, in 1967–68 allowed Lee to undertake one of his relatively few secular works. Other secular work included a staircase window in Carpenters' Hall showing shields supported by a schematic tree completed in 1970, an abstract work above the entrance of Montreal General Hospital in 1971 and a large heraldic appliqué in the Glaziers Hall in 1975.

Other work completed about this time included in 1969 the east window of St Giles' Matlock, Derbyshire - the Incarnation expressed in symbols and, in King Charles the Martyr, Tunbridge Wells; Ruth "amid the alien corn".

A three-light window (see image) depicting St Thomas Becket in St John the Baptist's church, Penshurst, Kent was presented by the people of Penshurst in August 1970 in commemoration of the institution of Wilhelmus as the first Parish priest on 27 December 1170 by Becket. Lee's 1970 east window in St John the Baptist, Belmont depicts Christ's baptism with Mary and the Baptist, the Holy Spirit descending in a whirlwind.

A pair of small west windows in the Church of the Holy Cross at Binstead, Isle of Wight, date from the early 1970s—part of restoration work following fire damage to the nave. Lee's windows feature a phoenix, a peacock and the dove.

About thirty windows and panels, many of badges, in Guildford Cathedral are Lee's work, installed at various times between 1974 and 1992.

In 1971 Lee's semi-abstract Iveagh memorial was installed in the south aisle of Saint Andrew and St Patrick, Elvedon.

Lee's 1975 window commemorating local JP, Arthur Darby, in St Andrew's, Sutton-in-Ely has an accompanying description written by Lee himself in which he not only describes the window, a theme of Man ascending and God descending, but also some of his philosophy on the role of stained glass in worship. Another 1975 work joined Lee's 1962 "Benedicite" east window at the University of Glasgow Memorial Chapel.

The church of St Mary the Virgin, Swanley has four two-light windows by Lee completed between 1979 and 1982 showing St Michael and St Peter, the Annunciation, Visitation and Presentation. The church also has windows by Lee's assistants; Lydia Marouf and Philippa Martin.

== Teaching ==
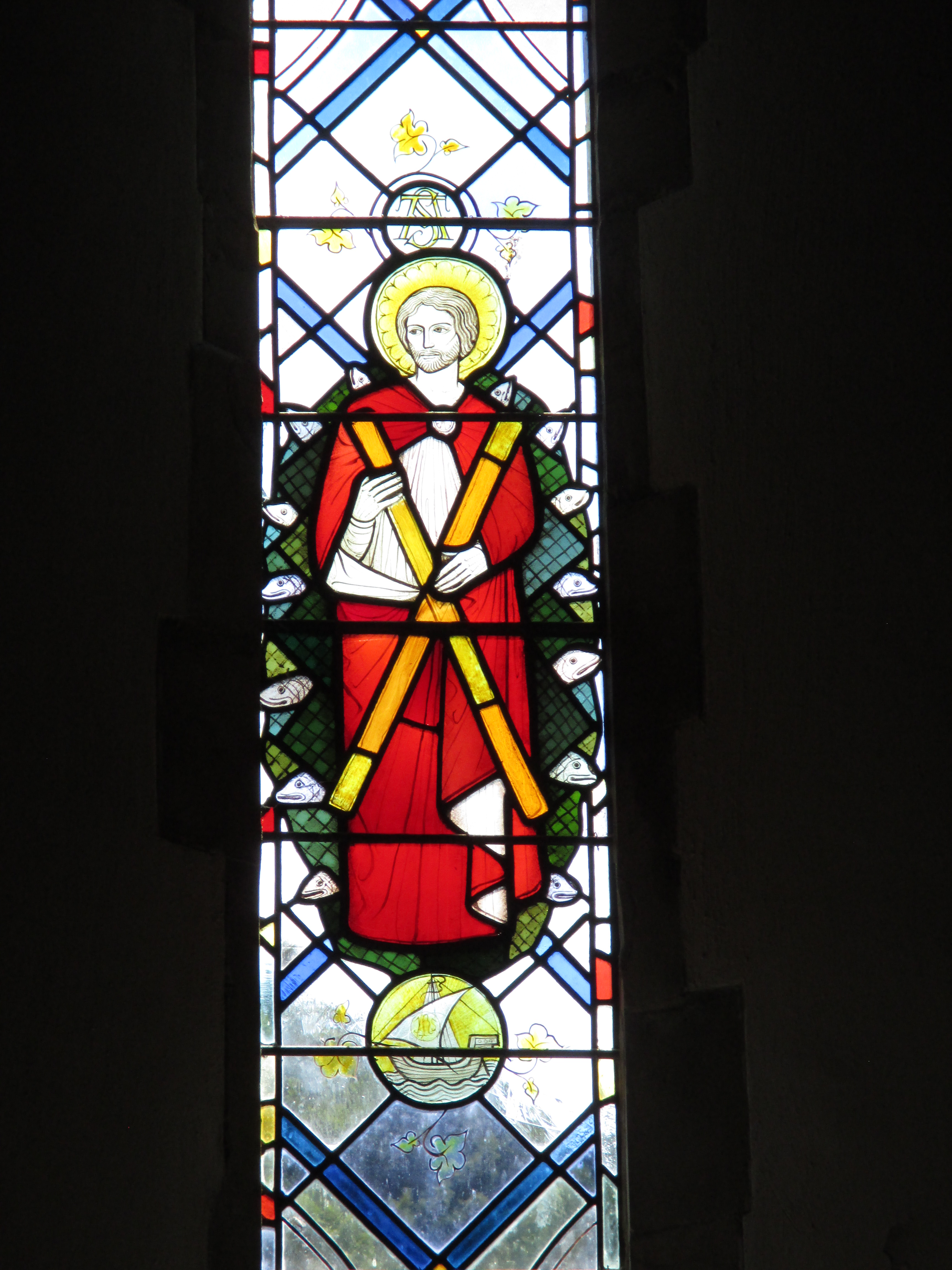
St Andrew and St Mary's Church, Fletching, East Sussex

Both in his role at RCA and in his commercial work, Lee was generous in passing on his knowledge to students and more than a dozen assistants that apprenticed to him over the years. Several became eminent practitioners in their own right including Jane Gray and Philippa Martin. He was unusual amongst artists in that he often included his assistant's initials in his signature glassmark. This support continued into later life, Lee contributed the foreword to Jane Gray's autobiography; Playing with Rainbows, published when he was one hundred years old.

Lee wrote several books on his craft. In 1967, shortly before leaving his post at RCA, he wrote Stained Glass, a handbook for artists. In 1976 he co-authored Stained Glass, An Illustrated Guide. His last book, written in 1977, The Appreciation of Stained Glass encapsulated his artistic philosophy.

In 1974 he was master of the Worshipful Company of Glaziers and helped introduce measures to encourage practising stained-glass artists into the company at an affordable rate and encourage women into the profession. He was a fellow of the British Society of Master Glass Painters.

== Later life ==
Lee continued to work as a stained glass artist until the early 1990s. Lee's last big church window was completed in 1991 at St Martin's Brasted, Kent. His last window is in the library of Chew Valley School, Bristol, in memory of his grandson, killed in a car crash in 1994.

His wife, Dorothy died in 1996. Lawrence Stanley Lee died 25 April 2011 aged 101. He was survived by their sons, Stephen and Martin.
