= Kennie Tsui =

New Zealand chemical and environmental engineer

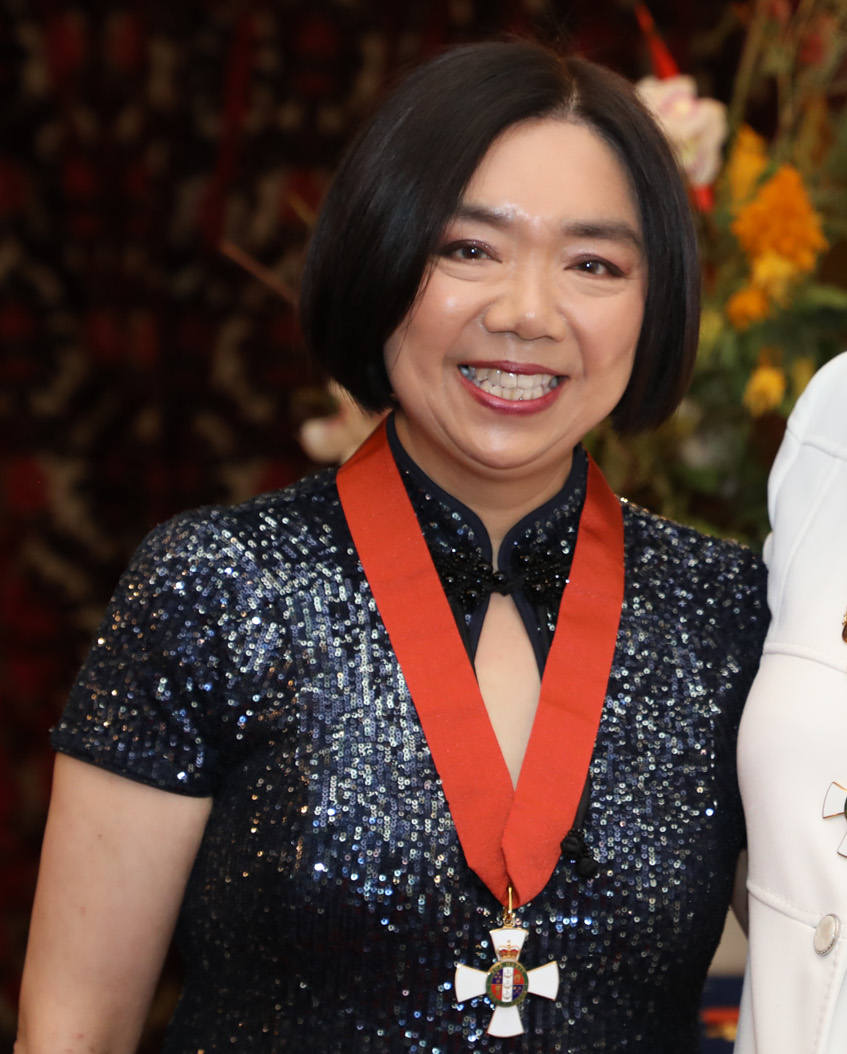
Tsui in 2025

Kennie Tsui CNZM is a New Zealand chemical and environmental engineer. In July 2021, she was appointed chief executive of the New Zealand Geothermal Association. In December 2024, she was appointed a Companion of the New Zealand Order of Merit, for services to the environment and governance.

== Biography ==
Tsui is the chair of the Wellington branch of Engineering New Zealand. Since 2016, she has been chair of the International Partnership of Geothermal Technologies. In 2019, she was appointed principal analyst for the New Zealand Climate Change Commission. In 2020, she received the Fulton-Downer Gold Medal for her leadership in the engineering industry.

In the 2025 New Year Honours, Tsui was appointed a Companion of the New Zealand Order of Merit, for services to the environment and governance.
