= Jan Evans-Freeman =

New Zealand engineering professor

Jan H. Evans-Freeman
- Education: University of Manchester
- Scientific career
- Workplaces: Sheffield Hallam University, University of Canterbury

Jan H. Evans-Freeman was the Pro-Vice-Chancellor of the University of Canterbury College of Engineering between 2009 until 2021, and is an English-New Zealand professor of engineering. She then became the Pro-Vice-Chancellor Sustainability at the University of Canterbury until 2025. After obtaining a Ph.D. at the University of Manchester she moved to Sheffield Hallam University and then University of Canterbury in 2009. As well as her academic roles, she holds a number of industry roles. From March 2024 to March 2026 she was the President of Engineering New Zealand.

== Education ==
Evans-Freeman was educated at the University of Manchester Institute of Science of Technology (now known as Manchester University) where she completed a PhD in electronic engineering after obtaining a physics degree with first-class honours.

== Career ==
In 1990 Evans-Freeman became a lecturer in the department of electrical engineering at the University of Manchester, Institute of Science of Technology. In 2004 she then took on the position of professor of electronic materials and head of research centre at Sheffield Hallam University. Currently Evans-Freeman is the pro-vice-chancellor of sustainability at the University of Canterbury and has been in this position since 2021. Prior to that she was the pro-vice-chancellor of the University of Canterbury College of Engineering, commencing in 2009.

She is a member of the board for a number of organisations in the electricity sector and engineering industry including the Electric Power Engineering Centre, the Wireless Research Centre, Engineering New Zealand and the University of Canterbury Earthquake Centre.

Evans-Freeman has published over 100 research papers, including 'Characterisation of defects in p-GaN by Admittance Spectroscopy' and 'Kinetics of self interstitials reactions in p-type silicon irradiated with alpha particles'.

Jan is currently working as a dog trainer, a particular passion of hers.
