= Kath Dickinson =

New Zealand botanist

- Born: Katharine Josephine Mary Dickinson
- Education: University of Tasmania
- Awards: Te Tohu Taiao Award
- Scientific career
- Workplaces: University of Otago
- Thesis: Vegetation and fuel dynamics following clearfelling of dry Eucalypt forests on Dolerite in Southeastern Tasmania with special reference to the use of fire in forest regeneration (1985)

Katharine Josephine Mary Dickinson is a New Zealand academic working in the field of botany. In 2009 the New Zealand Ecological Society awarded Dickinson the Te Tohu Taiao Award, an award for ecological excellence. As of 2018 she is a full professor at the University of Otago.

== Academic career ==
After a 1985 PhD thesis titled 'Vegetation and fuel dynamics following clearfelling of dry Eucalypt forests on Dolerite in Southeastern Tasmania with special reference to the use of fire in forest regeneration' at the University of Tasmania in Australia, Dickinson moved to the University of Otago in New Zealand, rising to full professor in 2009.

Dickinson has published in diverse areas, but particularly in alpine systems and ecology.

In 2009, Dickinson was awarded the Te Tohu Taiao Award by the New Zealand Ecological Society. She is recognised as an excellent teacher at a national level.

== Selected works ==
- Conservation Commission of the Northern Territory, B. A. Wilson, O. S. Brocklehurst, M. J. Clark, and K. J. M. Dickinson. Vegetation survey of the Northern Territory. Conservation Commission of the Northern Territory, 1991.
- Crisp, Philippa N., K. J. M. Dickinson, and G. W. Gibbs. "Does native invertebrate diversity reflect native plant diversity? A case study from New Zealand and implications for conservation." Biological Conservation 83, no. 2 (1998): 209–220.
- Derraik, José GB, Gerard P. Closs, Katharine JM Dickinson, Philip Sirvid, Barbara IP Barratt, and Brian H. Patrick. "Arthropod morphospecies versus taxonomic species: a case study with Araneae, Coleoptera, and Lepidoptera." Conservation Biology 16, no. 4 (2002): 1015–1023.
- Cavieres, Lohengrin A., Rob W. Brooker, Bradley J. Butterfield, Bradley J. Cook, Zaal Kikvidze, Christopher J. Lortie, Richard Michalet et al. "Facilitative plant interactions and climate simultaneously drive alpine plant diversity." Ecology Letters 17, no. 2 (2014): 193–202.
- Kirkpatrick, J. B., and K. J. M. Dickinson. "The impact of fire on Tasmanian alpine vegetation and soils." Australian Journal of Botany 32, no. 6 (1984): 613–629.
