= Gerald Shirtcliff =

New Zealand fraudster (born 1945)

- Born: 1945 (age 79–80)
- Other names: William Fisher (stolen identity)
- Known for: CTV Building; Qualification fraud

Gerald Morton Shirtcliff (Note: His surname is Shirtcliffe but it is often shortened to Shirtcliff.) (born 1945) is a New Zealand fraudster who posed as an engineer, working under a fake identity and qualifications. He received public attention following the collapse of the CTV Building, which caused 115 deaths, in the 2011 Christchurch earthquake as the subsequent investigation over his role as the building's construction manager in the 1980s led to revelations of his deception. He worked in Australia under the name Will Fisher, an identity Shirtcliff stole from a former colleague.

== Early life and education ==
Gerald Morton Shirtcliffe was born in Wellington in 1945 as the third child in his family, after two daughters. His father, Morton Shirtcliff, was a business executive who by the time of retirement would become the manager of Shell Oil for the South Island. He was also a pilot and taught Shirtcliff to fly. Shirtcliff attended Rongotai College in Wellington, where he did neither greatly nor poorly academically. He participated in choir and had also become a bandsman in the Territorial Army and played the trumpet or cornet.

== Career ==
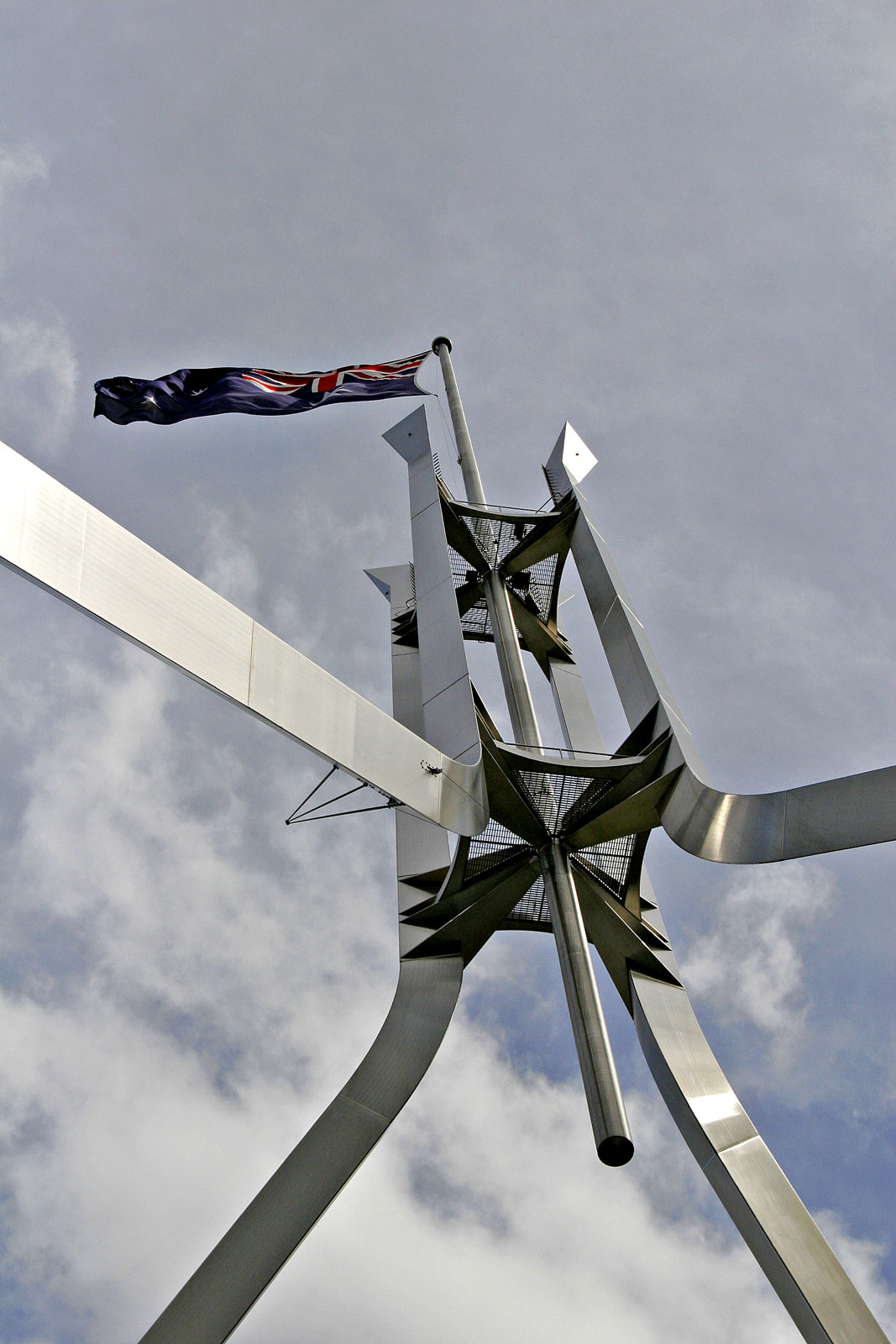
The flagpole on top of the Australian Parliament House, one of the many projects Shirtcliff was involved in

After leaving secondary school, Shirtcliff went to work for a bank in Wellington, and later an insurance company. According to The Press, his coworkers of that time have said that Shirtcliff had a tendency to lie. He went to Wanganui Flying School to get a commercial pilot's licence. His father thought that overseas experience might be a good idea for Shirtcliff, so he organised a job for him in South Africa. Shirtcliff worked there from 1968 to 1969 in Pretoria at the engineering consultancy company Van Niekerk, Klein and Edwards (now known as VKE) as a junior technician. According to Niek Diedericks, a colleague at the time, Shirtcliff told him that he was avoiding the draft for the Vietnam War, despite New Zealand not having one. Shirtcliff later left the company, which according to Diedericks, was because Shirtcliff allegedly forged a signature on a cheque and cashed it in.

Shirtcliff moved to Sydney in late 1969, and stole the identity of a former colleague in South Africa: William Anthony Fisher, an English engineer. Using Fisher's name, birthplace, birthdate and Bachelor of Engineering degree from the University of Sheffield in England, Shirtcliff applied in 1971 for entrance to a master's programme at the University of New South Wales, and in 1974 he was granted a Master of Engineering Science in Highway Engineering. The Press reported in 2012 that "It is understood Shirtcliff was assisted in his thesis by his ... father." In 1972 he applied to join the Australian Institute of Engineers and for some time was a fleet manager for Streets ice cream. After working for some time as an engineer at the Sydney company MacDonald, Wagner and Priddle (now named Aurecon), he moved back to New Zealand in the mid-1980s, reverted to the Shirtcliff name, and began describing himself as a "registered" engineer, and at one point, "chartered".

At one point, Shirtcliff met commercial pilot Murray Cresswell at Christchurch Airport. Cresswell wanted to set up a regional airline. Shirtcliff became interested, and according to Cresswell, said that he could invest in it. Shirtcliff ended up working for the company in management; however, the two soon started to disagree with each other, and in 1986 the company had to shut down. That same year, he was assigned a construction manager role at Williams Construction for the CTV Building in Christchurch. Shirtcliff then partnered with Tony Scott, a co-worker at Williams, to found their own construction firm, Scott Shirtcliff Ltd. After the partnership ended, Shirtcliff founded the company Autoburger Ltd in October 1992 to set up burger shops in petrol stations. It later changed its name to Langford Services but failed in 1999. During some of this time, Shirtcliff was also employed by March Construction as an engineer.

Around 1999, Shirtcliff sold a failing vehicle-service franchise to investor Eric Zust after falsifying GST returns, making the business appear to be doing well. He then returned to Australia and in March 2000 started working in Queensland as a registered engineer. Zust pressed charges, and Shirtcliff was investigated for fraud. During the investigation, he spent a week in a Brisbane jail denying being Gerald Shirtcliff before admitting to it. Afterwards, he was extradited to New Zealand, convicted on nine charges of tax fraud in 2005, and sentenced to 20 months in prison. After two weeks, a judge decided that the rest of the 20 months could be served in home detention at the New Brighton home of Phil Stanley and Sue Lyons, who let him live with them. During this time, he helped the couple with their Sydenham automotive repair business. Following the end of his sentence, Shirtcliff moved back to Brisbane in 2007. Stanley later accused Shirtcliff of stealing his diesel engine invention—which allowed for an engine to use a combination of diesel and LPG—and patenting it in Australia and the United States. For the invention, Shirtcliff was given a $1000-a-week retainer for about a year by investor Wayne Smith. Smith later said that he had spent over $1 million on experts hired from Germany to work on the design.

During his time in Australia, Shirtcliff worked on the Kingsgate Hotel in the Kings Cross Centre in Sydney, as well as power stations, and the 80-metre tall flagpole on Parliament House in Canberra. Investigations have found that these structures have no issues. For the engineering companies Worley Parsons and Sedgman Limited, he worked on coal projects at Boggabri, Codrilla, Maules Creek, Lake Vermont and Caval Ridge, Mount Isa Mines, and in New Auckland in Gladstone. On his 2009 CV, he claimed that he had also worked on a gold mine in Ballarat, Victoria, and on buildings for the Loy Yang Power Station, also in Victoria.

== Later investigations ==
=== CTV Building ===
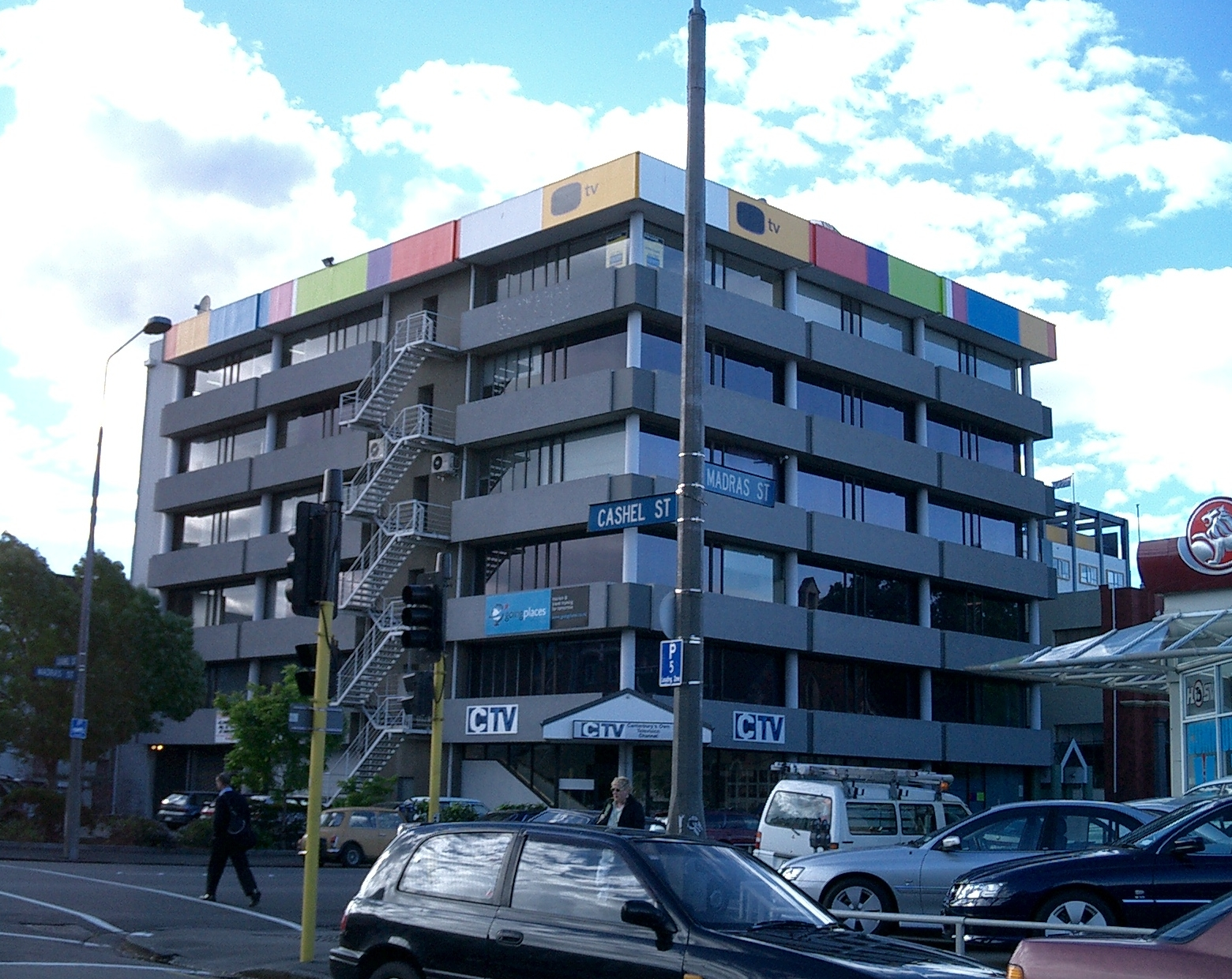
The CTV Building before the earthquake

In 1986, Shirtcliff was the manager of Williams Construction, which was building the CTV Building, the future headquarters of Canterbury Television, in Christchurch. He was the construction manager supervising the construction of the building, which was completed in 1987. His job was to ensure that the building "was built to comply with drawings and calculations". In 1987, Shirtcliff and his colleagues resigned from Williams Construction and moved to Union Construction Ltd, founded by Shirtcliff, Michael Brooks and Tony Scott. Completion of the building was then transferred to Union Construction Ltd. According to Shirtcliff's superior, Michael Brooks, Shirtcliff was fired from the company after Brooks had left, but, "not for reasons of technical incompetence". Brooks has described Shirtcliff's work as disappointing, saying, "He just wasn't up to the job. It's as simple as that".

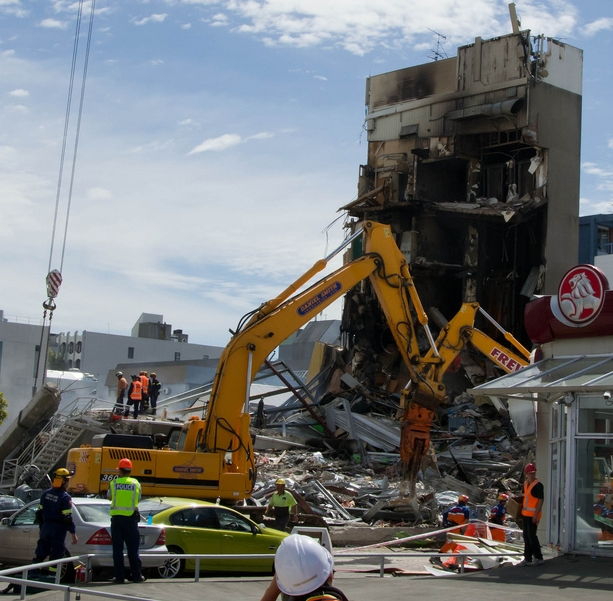
Ruins of the CTV Building

The building collapsed during the February 2011 Christchurch earthquake, resulting in 115 deaths. In June 2012, during the Royal Commission of Inquiry into the collapse of the CTV Building, Shirtcliff initially refused to give evidence and to say where in Australia he was located, leading to his first making headlines. At first, he communicated with investigators only via email, but by 8 August he was participating in the inquiry through a video call.

Shirtcliff claimed, "I had only limited involvement in the CTV building... [and] ...I deny I was responsible for supervising construction of the CTV building". Commission lawyers accused Shirtcliff of claiming that he had lower responsibility in the building's construction than he actually had. Shirtcliff said that he had visited the construction site once a month "at most" while his boss stated that he thought that Shirtcliff had visited the site daily.

The Royal Commission concluded that, among other significant deficiencies in the building's construction, which included serious design flaws, Shirtcliff "did not spend sufficient time on the site to perform his role adequately." Ultimately, the police decided not to press charges against any of those involved, due to the insufficient weight of the evidence.

=== Fraud investigations ===
Following the initial attention over Shirtcliff's refusal to give evidence at the inquiry, a tip was passed to The Press reporter Martin van Beynen, who investigated and uncovered the breadth of Shirtcliff's deception. When confronted with the allegations of identity theft, Shirtcliff denied the claims and threatened to sue if the allegations were published. The Press then published the story in September 2012, which resulted in what has been described as a "minor sensation" in New Zealand and a "scandal" in Australia. In October, an episode of the Australian television news programme 60 Minutes about him aired.

After The Press provided their identity theft investigation to the Brisbane engineering consultancy company WorleyParsons, where Shirtcliff had started working in 2009, the company started investigating him themselves and, as a result, terminated him. Shortly afterwards, Shirtcliff started contracting for Sedgman, another Brisbane engineering company, who also terminated Shirtcliff after hearing the allegations. Engineers Australia and the University of New South Wales also started investigating, and the university went on to strip Shirtcliff of his degree. In October 2012, Engineers Australia came to the conclusion that Shirtcliff had stolen the identity of Fisher, and revoked his membership. Engineers Australia also complained to the Australian Federal Police about the false identity, but after a five-month investigation a spokeswoman for the police said that "no Commonwealth offences were identified", and the police laid no charges against him. The Australian Police said that they had given "advice" to the New Zealand Police and would provide assistance. Shirtcliff was also investigated by the New Zealand Police.

In June 2014, Shirtcliff pleaded guilty to 146 charges brought by the Queensland Board of Professional Engineers in Magistrates Court and was fined AU$500,000. The charges included making false or misleading statements and working as an unqualified engineer. He also had to pay AU$20,000 in professional costs.

== Personal life ==
Shirtcliff has spent most of his working life in Australia. As of 2012, he lives on the coast of Cleveland, Queensland. Shirtcliff met his wife, Julie Rook, in Australia when he worked for MacDonald, Wagner, and Priddle.

== Fake identity ==
Shirtcliff's fake identity was taken from William Anthony Fisher. Shirtcliff used Fisher's name, birthdate, birthplace, and Bachelor of Engineering degree from the University of Sheffield in England. Fisher was born in Hong Kong in 1946, got his Bachelor of Engineering degree in 1967, and became a chartered engineer in 1974 in London. When Fisher and Shirtcliff worked in South Africa in the 1960s, the two flatted together for about six to eight months. It was during that time, Fisher later noted, that the original copy of his university degree had gone missing. Fisher moved to England in 1969 to get married and lost contact with Shirtcliff. In 2012, Fisher described Shirtcliff as being colourful, a bit mysterious, and a person who told a lot of stories. On an episode of the news television show 60 minutes, Fisher said about the identity theft "It makes me feel pretty rotten; my name is stuck there like mud isn't it? Part of my anxiety is what the hell else has he got up to?".

In 2012, Shirtcliff said that he had been living in Australia with the name "Fisher" due to "family issues" that had been ongoing for 40 years. He said it was due to abuse from his father, which his family has denied.
