= Engineering New Zealand =

Professional organization

Engineering New Zealand Te Ao Rangahau
- Engineering New Zealand Te Ao Rangahau
- Formation: 1914 (New Zealand Society of Civil Engineers)
- Type: Professional body
- Location: Wellington, New Zealand
- Members: 22,000
- President: Kennie Tsui
- Chief Executive: Richard Templer
- Staff: 80
- Website: www.engineeringnz.org

Engineering New Zealand (Māori: Te Ao Rangahau) is a non-profit professional body that upholds professional engineering standards in Aotearoa New Zealand, advocates for engineers, and provides advice to the engineering industry.

Engineering New Zealand is responsible for accrediting engineering education programmes in New Zealand and is the Registration Authority for Chartered Professional Engineers (CPEng) in New Zealand.

Membership provides several benefits for engineers in Aotearoa:

- Credibility: Enhanced professional reputation, new career opportunities and being perceived as trusted leaders.
- Connection: Members are part of an inclusive, supportive and connected network.
- Career growth: Access courses, events, online learning and leadership training – plus practical tools and resources to support day-to-day work and long-term goals.
- Purpose and pride: Members play a part in shaping a better Aotearoa – where their work contributes to climate action, community wellbeing and a stronger future.
- Advocacy: Being a member means having a voice in the issues that matter – from building systems reform to the overhaul of resource management. Engineering New Zealand advocates for the profession, influences systems and upholds the standards that build public trust.

== History ==
The first professional engineering body in New Zealand, the Institute of Local Government Engineers of New Zealand, was formed in 1912. The following year the New Zealand Society of Civil Engineers was formed. The two bodies merged in 1914 and were known under the later name until 1937.

The organisation changed its name to The New Zealand Institution of Engineers in 1937. In 1959 the Association of Consulting Engineers New Zealand (ACENZ) was created as a consultancy division, and became a separate entity in 1970. The name Institution of Professional Engineers New Zealand (IPENZ) was adopted in 1982.

In 1989, IPENZ became a founding signatory to the Washington Accord.

In 2002, the Chartered Professional Engineers of New Zealand Act 2002 gave IPENZ the designation "Registration Authority", making them responsible for the registration, complaints and disciplinary processes of Chartered Professional Engineers (CPEng) in New Zealand.

In 2017, the organisation changed its name to Engineering New Zealand to reflect a significant shift in strategic direction. It retains the legal name "Institution of Professional Engineers New Zealand".

In 2018, the organisation adopted the Māori name Te Ao Rangahau (which roughly translates as "the world of engineering").

== Upholding standards ==
=== Tertiary program accreditation ===
Engineering New Zealand is a signatory to the Washington Accord, Sydney Accord and Dublin Accord. As a signatory, Engineering New Zealand is responsible for accrediting four-year engineering degrees (Washington Accord), three-year engineering technology degrees (Sydney Accord) and two-year engineering diplomas (Dublin Accord) in New Zealand. These programmes are internationally recognised under their respective accords. Engineering New Zealand also recognises qualifications from other signatories.

=== Chartered Professional Engineer ===
Engineering New Zealand is the Registration Authority for Chartered Professional Engineers (CPEng) in New Zealand, as delegated by the Chartered Professional Engineers of New Zealand Act 2002. As the Registration Authority, they are responsible for assessing engineers as well as managing the complaints and disciplinary processes.

== Growing the pipeline of engineers ==
=== The Wonder Project ===
The Wonder Project is Engineering New Zealand's industry-led STEM education initiative. It's designed to inspire rangatahi (young people) with STEM across the critical years of their school experience, and to encourage them into STEM careers.

It includes successive programmes aligned to the New Zealand Curriculum, with an emphasis on reaching girls, Māori and Pacific Peoples.

=== The Diversity Agenda ===
Engineering New Zealand is a Founding Partner and Accord Signatory of The Diversity Agenda – a joint initiative between Engineering New Zealand, the Association of Consulting Engineers New Zealand and Te Kāhui Whaihanga New Zealand Institute of Architects. The Diversity Agenda encourages firms working in engineering and architecture to become more diverse and inclusive through awareness, empowerment and action. Membership as an Accord Signatory provides access to a range of resources, events, tools and tips.

== Fellowships and awards ==
Engineering New Zealand elects Fellows and Distinguished Fellows annually.

Notable Distinguished Fellows include:

- Jan Evans-Freeman
- Gretchen Kivell

Notable Fellows include:

- Paul Callaghan
- Neil Dodgson
- Philippa Martin
- Thomas Paulay
- Kennie Tsui
- Sarah Wakes
- Bing Xue

Other major awards programmes run by Engineering New Zealand include the biennual ENVI Awards. and biennial Auckland Branch Awards. Other awards, scholarships and grants are offered through the Engineering New Zealand Foundation.

== Presidents ==
- Horace Lusty (1949 – )
- Francis Small (engineer) (1996–1997)
- Gerry Coates (2003– )

== See also ==
- ACENZ
- Engineer
- Professional Engineer
- Engineering
- Fields of engineering
- Learned society
- Professional association
- Professional body
- Standards organizations
