= Lisa McNeill =

New Zealand consumer behaviourist

- Born: Lisa Sylvia Simpson; 1981 (age 44–45)

Academic background
- Education: University of Otago
- Thesis: Retail sales promotion in the supermarket industry: a tri-country comparison of New Zealand, Singapore and Malaysia (2003)

Academic work
- Institutions: University of Otago
- Doctoral students: Masoud Karami

Lisa Sylvia McNeill (née Simpson; born 1981) is a New Zealand academic, and is a full professor at the University of Otago, specialising in consumer behaviour, especially with respect to sustainability, ethical consumption and fashion.

== Early life and education ==
McNeill was born in 1981. She studied at the University of Otago, graduating with a Bachelor of Arts degree in 1999 and a Bachelor of Commerce degree with first-class honours in marketing management in 2001. She completed a PhD, with a thesis titled Retail sales promotion in the supermarket industry: a tri-country comparison of New Zealand, Singapore and Malaysia, at the University of Otago in 2003.

== Academic career ==
McNeill then joined the faculty of the University of Otago, rising to associate professor in 2014 and full professor in 2023. She has been the Associate Dean Postgraduate Research since 2019. McNeill is a principal investigator in the Food Waste Innovation research theme at Otago, where her interest is in sustainable packaging of food, and consumer behaviour. She is also part of an international collaboration on sustainable fashion aimed at enabling multi-disciplinary conversations on sustainable fashion. According to the university, her 2015 paper with colleague Rebecca Moore examining relationships that people have with fashion and sustainability is "internationally considered a seminal work", and she authored one of the top ten most downloaded papers in the International Journal of Consumer Studies in 2020.

McNeill researches consumer behaviour, and is interested in consumer identity, sustainable fashion, and fashion ethics. Her research projects have included the concept of 'slow fashion', consumer understanding of fashion labelling, textile consumption and waste, collaborative consumption, and cultures of fashion, waste, repair and wardrobe curation in Korea, New Zealand and Canada.

McNeill is an associate editor or on the editorial board of a number of journals, including the International Journal of Consumer Studies, Sustainability, and Young Consumers.

== Selected works ==
- Rollo A.S. Grayson; Lisa S. McNeill (2009). "Using atmospheric elements in service retailing: understanding the bar environment". Journal of Services Marketing. 23 (7): 517–527. doi:10.1108/08876040910995301. Wikidata Q125016526.
- Robertson, Kirsten; Lisa McNeill; Green, James A.; Claire Roberts (2011). "Illegal Downloading, Ethical Concern, and Illegal Behavior". Journal of Business Ethics. 108 (2): 215–227. doi:10.1007/s10551-011-1079-3. Wikidata Q59414236.
- Robert Hamlin; Lisa McNeill (2016). "Does the Australasian "Health Star Rating" Front of Pack Nutritional Label System Work?". Nutrients. 8 (6). doi:10.3390/nu8060327. PMC 4924168. PMID 27258305. Wikidata Q37045078.
- Lisa S. McNeill; Douglas, Katie (2011). "Retailing masculinity: Gender expectations and social image of male grooming products in New Zealand". Journal of Retailing and Consumer Services. 18 (5): 448–454. doi:10.1016/j.jretconser.2011.06.009. Wikidata Q125016520.
- Robert P Hamlin; Lisa S McNeill; Vanessa Moore (2014). "The impact of front-of-pack nutrition labels on consumer product evaluation and choice: an experimental study". Public Health Nutrition. 18 (12): 2126–2134. doi:10.1017/s1368980014002997. PMID 25529170. Wikidata Q50599513.
- Lisa S. McNeill (2018). "Fashion and women's self-concept: a typology for self-fashioning using clothing". Journal of Fashion Marketing and Management. 22 (1): 82–98. doi:10.1108/jfmm-09-2016-0077. Wikidata Q125016501.
