= Association of Consulting Engineers New Zealand =

Engineering organization of New Zealand

The Association of Consulting Engineers New Zealand (ACENZ) is New Zealand's main business association representing engineers providing consultancy services in a wide range of disciplines. It was founded in 1959 as the consulting division of IPENZ, though it has been a separate entity since 1970.

It has 176 corporate members with a total of around 8,500 staff (2007 data), up from about 5,800 in 2001.

Apart from its functions as a representative of the interests of its member companies, it annually judges engineering awards for the most innovative and exceptional engineering projects of New Zealand.
