= Philippa Martin =

New Zealand academic

Philippa Anne Martin
- Education: University of Canterbury
- Scientific career
- Fields: Digital communications and signal processing
- Workplaces: University of Canterbury
- Thesis: Adaptive iterative decoding : block turbo codes and multilevel codes (2001)

Philippa Anne Martin is a New Zealand electrical engineering academic and a senior member of the Institute of Electrical and Electronics Engineers. She previously was a full professor and since 2026 is a professor emerita at the University of Canterbury.

== Academic career ==
After a 2001 PhD titled Adaptive iterative decoding: block turbo codes and multilevel codes at the University of Canterbury, she moved to the University of Hawaii before returning to Canterbury and rising to full professor.

From 2005 to 2008 and from 2015 to 2016, she was an editor for the IEEE Transactions on Wireless Communications journal.

== Selected works ==
- Tee, James SK, Desmond P. Taylor, and Philippa A. Martin. "Multiple serial and parallel concatenated single parity-check codes." IEEE Transactions on Communications 51, no. 10 (2003): 1666–1675.
- Hanif, Muhammad Fainan, Peter J. Smith, Desmond P. Taylor, and Philippa A. Martin. "MIMO cognitive radios with antenna selection." IEEE Transactions on Wireless Communications 10, no. 11 (2011): 3688–3699.
- Martin, Philippa A., Desmond P. Taylor, and Marc PC Fossorier. "Soft-input soft-output list-based decoding algorithm." In Information Theory, 2002. Proceedings. 2002 IEEE International Symposium on, p. 339. IEEE, 2002.
- Vitetta, Giorgio, Desmond P. Taylor, Giulio Colavolpe, Fabrizio Pancaldi, and Philippa A. Martin. Wireless communications: algorithmic techniques. John Wiley & Sons, 2013.
- Martin, Philippa A., and Desmond P. Taylor. "On multilevel codes and iterative multistage decoding." IEEE Transactions on Communications 49, no. 11 (2001): 1916–1925.
