= Barts and The London School of Medicine and Dentistry =

Medical and dental school in London, England

- Motto: Latin: Amara lento tempera risu
- Motto in English: Temper the bitter things in life with a smile
- Type: Medical and dental school
- Established: 1123 (St Bartholomew's Hospital); 1785 (London Hospital Medical College); 1843 (Medical College of St Bartholomew's Hospital); 1995 (Merger of medical colleges with Queen Mary and Westfield College)
- Parent institution: Queen Mary University of London
- Affiliations: United Hospitals
- President: Lord Mayor of London
- Warden: Mark Caulfield
- Students: 3,410
- Undergraduates: 2,235
- Postgraduates: 1,175
- Location: London, England
- Colours
- Website: www.qmul.ac.uk/smd/

Barts and The London School of Medicine and Dentistry, commonly known as Barts, is the medical and dental school of Queen Mary University of London, a constituent college of the federal University of London. It was formed in 1995 by the merger of the London Hospital Medical College (the first school to be granted an official charter for medical teaching in 1785) and the Medical College of St Bartholomew's Hospital (established in 1843, with medical teaching dating back to the founding of the hospital in 1123).

The school has multiple sites, having a presence at the site of both of the former colleges at and near their respective hospitals, St Bartholomew's Hospital (in Smithfield in the City of London and nearby in Charterhouse Square), and the Royal London Hospital in Whitechapel with an additional site at Queen Mary's main (Mile End) campus, and a satellite campus, commencing 2017, on the island of Gozo in Malta.

As of 2018, the school had 2,235 undergraduate and 1,175 postgraduate students, for a total of 3,410 students.

== History ==
=== London Hospital Medical College ===
The medical college at the London Hospital, now the Royal London Hospital, opened in 1785. It was England's first purpose-built medical school, pioneering a new kind of medical education, with an emphasis on theoretical and clinical teaching. The teaching premises were expanded in 1854, when buildings in Turner Street were built and opened, which are still in use today. For many years it functioned as an unincorporated general medical school of the University of London, until it was incorporated as The London Hospital Medical College on 30 March 1949. A dental school also opened at the London Hospital in 1911, acquiring the new dental institute and expanding student numbers during the 1960s. Dental education developed during the 1970s, increasing collaboration between dentists and other professionals.

=== Medical College of St Bartholomew's Hospital ===
Records of students at St Bartholomew's Hospital date back to at least 1662, although a purpose-built lecture theatre at the hospital was not built until 1791, and it was not until that 1822 the governors formally approved the provision of medical education within the hospital. Later a residential college was established, which moved to premises at Charterhouse Square in the 1930s. The medical college was formally established in 1843, and was incorporated as the Medical College of St Bartholomew's Hospital on 26 July 1921.

=== Merger ===
Both colleges were admitted to the University of London in 1900, and a close association between the two was developed following the Royal Commission on Medical Education in 1968, with new links with the then Queen Mary College being established at the same time. In 1989 the pre-clinical teaching at the two colleges was merged and sited in the Basic Medical Sciences Building at Queen Mary (where it stayed until 2005, when it was moved to the Blizard Building at the Whitechapel campus). The two colleges officially merged in 1995, along with Queen Mary and Westfield College, University of London, now known as Queen Mary University of London, forming the combined entity known as Barts and The London School of Medicine and Dentistry.

In 2016, the school reached an agreement with the government of Malta to open a satellite campus on the island of Gozo, with a purpose-built medical school and anatomy centre to be built on the Gozo General Hospital campus. The first students were admitted in 2017, and the buildings were due to be completed in 2019.

In recent years, Queen Mary University of London has attempted to remove aspects of the 'Barts and The London' name and identity from the School of Medicine and Dentistry. In 2019, QMUL changed the logo of Barts and The London School of Medicine and Dentistry, to much resistance from staff and students of the medical and dental school. A petition was sent to the principal of the university, Colin Bailey. This has become an ongoing issue, with Barts and The London Students' Association condemning the way the BL identity and community had been treated. Current students at Barts and The London, as well as alumni, are concerned that this line of change will lead to a complete eradication of the tradition and heritage of Barts and The London.

In 2022, students and alumni reacted with even more anger when University leadership attempted to drop the 'Barts and The London' name entirely and rebrand the School to 'Queen Mary University of London Faculty of Medicine and Dentistry'; QMUL responded by claiming that the change was necessary to ensure 'no possible confusion' in its own brand identity.

== Campus ==
The Blizard Building in Whitechapel

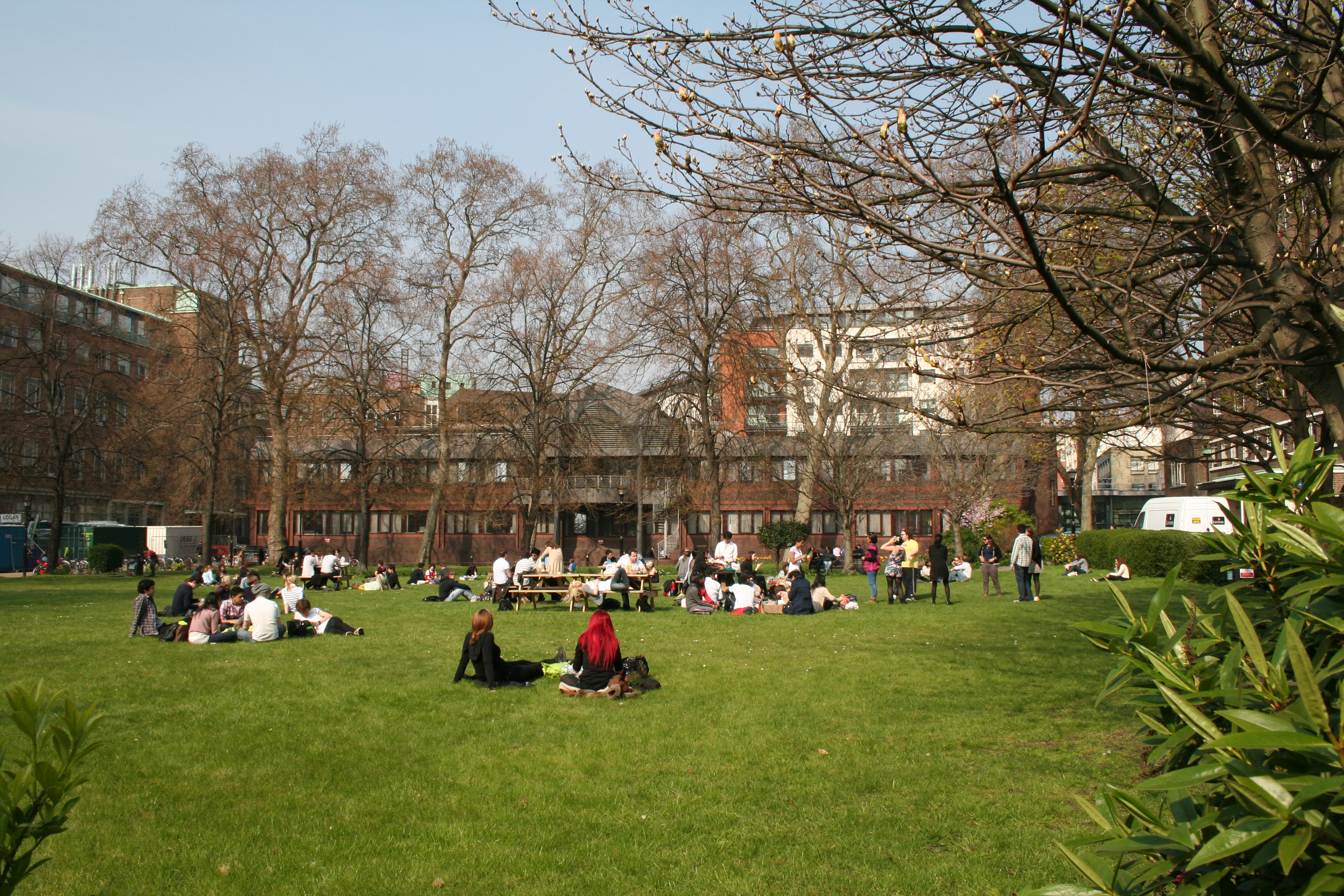
Charterhouse Square

The school is split over a total of five campuses, with the main ones based around the location of the former medical colleges and their respective hospitals. Most medical teaching takes place at the Whitechapel campus, adjacent to The Royal London Hospital. The Blizard Building, a purpose-built building housing research facilities and a lecture theatre, was completed at the Whitechapel site in 2005, and is where most lectures take place. Most dental teaching takes place at the Royal London Dental Hospital, which opened in 2014, adjacent to the main hospital site.

Teaching, in particular clinical skills teaching, also takes place at the West Smithfield campus, adjacent to St Bartholomew's Hospital, and the nearby Charterhouse Square campus. The Charterhouse Square campus is also the home of the William Harvey Research Institute, focusing on pharmacology, and houses student residences.

Some additional teaching, including anatomy and dissection, takes place at the main QMUL campus in Mile End.

=== Hospitals ===
Medical students undertake clinical placements in the following hospitals, the majority of which are located in the City of London and East London, with a few in neighbouring Essex:

==== London ====
- Goodmayes Hospital
- Homerton University Hospital
- King George Hospital
- Mile End Hospital
- Newham University Hospital
- Queen's Hospital
- Royal London Hospital
- St Bartholomew's Hospital
- Whipps Cross University Hospital
- Moorfields Eye Hospital

==== Essex ====
- Broomfield Hospital
- Colchester Hospital
- Princess Alexandra Hospital
- Southend University Hospital

== Academic profile ==
=== Teaching ===
A unique aspect of the Barts curriculum is the use of problem-based learning, which was first developed at McMaster University Medical School in the 1960s. Barts uses this method as part of an integrated curriculum as opposed to one that is solely or predominately based on problem based learning. Students work in groups with a tutor on a clinical case or problem, and use problem based learning to supplement the knowledge they acquire during their lectures.

The standard undergraduate Medicine course is a five-year course, which results in the award of an MBBS degree. Students also have the option of extending their studies by a further year in order to study for an intercalated BSc in a range of related subjects. This is usually done after the 2nd, 3rd or 4th year.

Students who already have a science or health-related degree and who wish to study Medicine can also choose to apply to the Graduate Entry Programme (GEP). This is a four-year course, with the first two years of the standard undergraduate course being condensed into one. The remaining years of the course are identical to the undergraduate course.

Several of the constituent institutes also offer undergraduate and postgraduate programmes such as Neuroscience by the Blizard Institute and Pharmacology by the William Harvey Research Institute. These programmes will result in the award of a BSc, MSc, or MRes, with undergraduate study options including optional years abroad or in industry.

=== Rankings ===
The medical school has scored highly in a number of independent rankings in recent years, placing it in the top 10 of medical schools in the United Kingdom:

- ranked 2nd by The Guardian (2017)
- ranked 3rd by The Times and The Sunday Times (2017)
- ranked 7th by The Complete University Guide (2017)
- ranked 9th (51st–100th in the world) by the QS World University Rankings (2016–17)
- ranked 10th (65th in the world) by the Times Higher Education (2016–17)
- ranked 7th (28th in the world) by CWTS Leiden Ranking (2016) based on the percentage of publications belonging to the top 10% of their field (PP top 10%)

The dental school has also been ranked highly:

- ranked 3rd by The Complete University Guide (2017)
- ranked 3rd by The Guardian (2017)
- ranked 4th by The Times and The Sunday Times (2017)

The William Harvey Research Institute is also widely considered to be the foremost centre for pharmacological research in Europe, and among the top in the world.

=== Admission ===
Admission to both the medical and dental schools is highly competitive. Over 2,500 applications to study medicine are received by the school each year. Of these, 800 candidates are interviewed and approximately 440 offers are made. For dentistry, over 700 applications are received, of which 250 candidates are interviewed and approximately 150 offers are made.

The school accepts A-levels, the International Baccalaureate Diploma, Irish Leaving Certificate, Scottish Highers, Cambridge Pre-U and the European Baccalaureate as entry qualifications. Both the medical and dental degrees are open to graduate students, with a minimum of a 2:1 required. Applicants must sit the UK Clinical Aptitude Test which is used alongside the UCAS application to determine selection for interview. The school also accepts medical students only from the universities of Cambridge, Oxford, and St Andrews aiming to complete a three-year direct clinical entry programme. Students applying to this scheme do not need to apply by 15 October deadline and are not required to take the UKCAT.

== Research ==
The school serves a diverse population in East London and the wider Thames Gateway, with the differing demographics of East London in contrast to other areas of the country providing the school with a unique teaching opportunity. Consequently, many of the school's research efforts are focused on conditions that are prevalent or endemic to the local area, for example, diabetes, hypertension, heart disease, tuberculosis and other chronic lung diseases, HIV, oral disease, and cancer. The school is associated with 8 nobel laureates.

The school has six research institutes:

- Barts Cancer Institute researches cancer and inflammation, experimental cancer medicine, haemato-oncology, cancer stem cells and ageing, cancer genomics, molecular oncology and imaging and tumour biology. The director is Nick Lemoine.
- Blizard Institute, which focuses on surgery, paediatrics, cutaneous, diabetes, gastroenterology, haematology, infectious diseases, neuroscience, pathology and health sciences.
- Institute of Dentistry does research and teaching in adult oral health, oral growth and development, and clinical and diagnostic oral sciences.
- Institute of Health Sciences Education is responsible for the teaching of pre-clinical medical sciences to medical students along with research in medical education and community based medical education.
- William Harvey Research Institute is a research facility focusing on biochemical pharmacology, orthopaedic diseases, genomics, clinical pharmacology and translational medicine and therapeutics. It was founded by Sir John Vane, with Professor Sir Mark Caulfield currently serving as its director. The institute is operated in part by the independent William Harvey Research Foundation which holds the rights to the 'William Harvey Research...' branding.
- Wolfson Institute of Population Health researches public health and policy, preventive medicine, epidemiology, mathematics and statistics, psychology and psychiatry.

== Students' Association ==
BLSA Logo

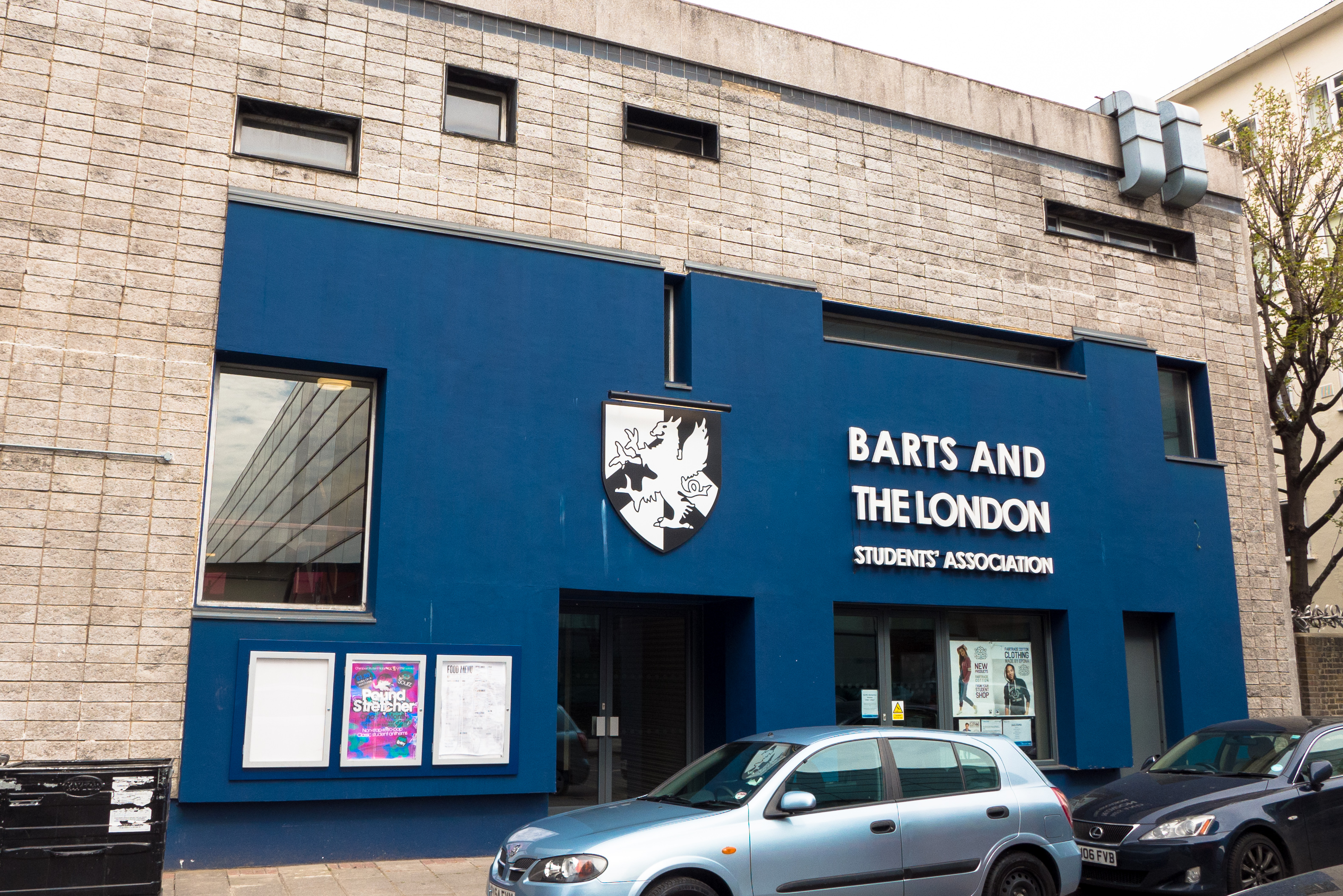
The BLSA building in Whitechapel

Barts and The London Students' Association (BLSA) is the students' union for the medical and dental school, a largely independent arm of Queen Mary Students' Union (QMSU) formed when the student unions of St Bartholomew's Hospital Medical School and the London Hospital Clubs Union merged with QMSU at the time their parent bodies merged in 1995.

The BLSA Building, where the students' association is based, is set to be demolished at the end of 2024. This building is the original site of the London Hospital Clubs' Union, and the BLSA will move into the Garrod Building, the original site of teaching at the London Hospital Medical College. The BLSA is led by a sabbatical student president, with a board of part-time student officers who operationally run the association, and provide activities for students at Barts and The London School of Medicine and Dentistry.

The Students' Association has a distinct structure and culture from that of QMSU, with its own clubs and societies for most sports and activities, competing in the National Association of Medics' Sports and United Hospitals Competitions against other schools and universities.

The BLSA also exists at the Malta Campus of the Medical School, based in Gozo, to provide students' union services to the students studying there.

== Notable people ==
=== Notable staff ===
- Stephanie Amiel – diabetologist
- William Baly
- Gustav Victor Rudolf Born
- Thomas Peel Dunhill – thyroid surgeon and Physician to the Queen of the United Kingdom
- Edward Frankland – chemist
- Sir James Galloway – dermatologist
- Samuel Gee
- Ian Jacobs – gynaecological oncologist
- Peter Kopelman
- Irene Leigh – dermatologist
- Henry Letheby – chemist and public health officer
- William Odling – helped develop the periodic table
- Alexander George Ogston – biochemist
- Dame Lesley Rees – professor and dean of Bart's Medical College
- Joseph Rotblat – Nobel Prize winner
- Wendy Savage – gynaecologist
- Denise Sheer – geneticist
- R.A. Shooter – professor of bacteriology and dean of Bart's Medical College 1972–1981
- Dorothy Stuart Russell – professor of morbid pathology
- John Robert Vane – Nobel Prize winner

=== Notable alumni ===
- George F. Abercrombie – British GP, cofounder of the Royal College of General Practitioners
- John Abernethy – surgeon
- Robert D. Acland – surgeon, pioneer in plastic and reconstructive microsurgery
- Joseph Adams – surgeon and pathologist
- Christopher Addison, 1st Viscount Addison – politician
- George Augustus Auden – professor of public health
- John Badley – surgeon
- Edward Bancroft – physician and double agent in the American Revolution
- Gopal Baratham – author and neurosurgeon
- Gilbert Barling – former vice-chancellor of the University of Birmingham
- Thomas John Barnardo – philanthropist
- Frederick Batten – neurologist and paediatrician
- Hannah Billig – famous wartime doctor
- William Blizard – surgeon
- George Bodington – pulmonary specialist
- Henry Edmund Gaskin Boyle – anaesthetist
- Robert Bridges – poet and holder of the honour of poet laureate from 1913
- Alfred James Broomhall – medical missionary
- George Busk – surgeon, zoologist and palaeontologist
- William Carr – former director of the Royal Australian Navy's Naval Medical Services
- Graham Chapman – comedian; member of the surreal comedy group Monty Python
- Anjem Choudary – Islamist, founder of al-Muhajiroun and Islam4UK, solicitor, convicted of inviting support for a proscribed organisation, namely the Islamic State of Iraq and the Levant, under the Terrorism Act 2000
- William Job Collins – surgeon and politician
- Brian Colvin – haematologist
- Albert Ruskin Cook – medical missionary
- John Desmond Cronin – politician and surgeon
- Tim Crow – psychiatrist
- Thomas Blizard Curling – surgeon
- John Langdon Down – first to describe Down syndrome, a genetic disorder named after him
- Horace Evans, 1st Baron Evans – Welsh GP, personal physician to King George VI
- Pamela Evans – GP and author
- John Fenning – British doctor and Olympic gold medallist
- John Freke – first ophthalmic surgeon
- Archibald Garrod – first physician to appreciate the importance of biochemistry in medicine
- Richard Gordon – screenwriter and novelist
- Martin Gore CBE – professor of medical oncology
- Major Greenwood – epidemiologist and statistician
- Sir Wilfred Grenfell – medical missionary
- Gordon Hamilton-Fairley – oncologist
- Anthony Hamilton-Smith, 3rd Baron Colwyn – politician
- William Harvey – described circulation
- Charles Hill, Baron Hill of Luton – politician and former chairman of the BBC
- James Hinton – surgeon and author
- Ebbe Hoff – founding director of the Virginia Division of Substance Abuse
- Eric John Holborow – physician and immunologist, known for his pioneering research on autoimmunity
- John Hughlings Jackson – neurologist
- John Hunt, Baron Hunt of Fawley – British GP, co-founder of the Royal College of General Practitioners
- John Hunter – surgeon and anatomist; namesake of the Hunterian Society
- Jonathan Hutchinson – ophthalmologist
- Donald McIntosh Johnson – author and politician
- Parveen Kumar – co-author of world-renowned medical textbook Kumar and Clarke's, former president of the British Medical Association and the Royal Society of Medicine, lectures occasionally at the Medical School
- William Lawrence – surgeon, a founder of British ophthalmology
- William Elford Leach – English zoologist and marine biologist
- John Leech – caricaturist
- Irene Leigh – dermatologist
- Suzy Lishman – former president of the Royal College of Pathologists
- Siew C. Ng - Hong-Kong based clinician-scientist and Croucher Professor in Medical Sciences
- William John Little – surgeon, pioneer of orthopaedic surgery
- Martyn Lloyd-Jones – Evangelical Christian religious leader
- Morell Mackenzie – pioneer of laryngology
- Johann Malawana – leader of BMA Junior Doctors Committee, trade unionist
- William Marsden – surgeon, founder of The Royal Free and Marsden Hospitals
- Peter William Mathieson – president of the University of Hong Kong
- John Preston Maxwell – medical missionary
- Robert Morrison – medical missionary
- Richard Owen – English biologist, comparative anatomist and palaeontologist
- Sir James Paget – surgeon and founder of scientific medical pathology
- James Parkinson – political activist and first to describe Parkinson's Disease
- Jonathan Pereira – pharmacologist
- Richard Pollok – gastroenterologist, medical researcher and academic
- Percivall Pott – English surgeon, founder of orthopaedy
- Sir Bentley Purchase – coroner, involved in Operation Mincemeat
- Peter J. Ratcliffe – British Nobel laureate physician-scientist
- Reza Razavi – vice president (Research) at King's College London and Director of the King’s Wellcome Trust EPSRC Centre For Medical Engineering
- W. H. R. Rivers – psychiatrist, psychiatric anthropologist
- Sir Ronald Ross – first British Nobel laureate, known for his work on the transmission of malaria
- Martine Rothblatt – entrepreneur, author, founder of United Therapeutics and Sirius Radio
- William Scovell Savory – surgeon
- Jay Sean – singer-songwriter
- Liz Shore – former deputy chief medical officer
- G. Spencer-Brown – mathematician
- Tareq Suheimat – Jordanian physician, military general and statesman
- Frederick Howard Taylor – medical missionary
- Herbert Hudson Taylor – medical missionary
- Hudson Taylor – medical missionary
- Roger Taylor – drummer of the band Queen
- Sir Frederick Treves, 1st Baronet – surgeon
- Daniel Hack Tuke – expert on mental illness
- William Turner – anatomist and former principal of the University of Edinburgh
- John Waterlow – British physiologist
- Hugh Watkins – cardiologist
- William James Erasmus Wilson – surgeon
- Peter Wingfield – actor
- Robert Winston – gynaecologist and politician
- Arthur Wint – Olympic gold medallist
- Adeline Yen Mah – author and physician

=== Fictional alumni ===
- Harold Legg – doctor in the British soap opera EastEnders from 1985 to 1997, making guest appearances in 2000 and 2004
- Dr. Watson – Sherlock Holmes's companion and "biographer": not only did the two first meet in the pathology laboratories in 1881, but Watson studied and met his friend Stamford (who was Watson's "dresser" – the equivalent nowadays of the surgical houseman) at St. Bartholomew's Hospital in the mid/late 1870s.

== See also ==
- Third-oldest university in England debate
