= Wang Guodong =

Wang Guodong is the name of:

- Wang Guodong (painter) (1931–2019), Chinese painter
- Wang Guodong (metallurgist) (born 1942), Chinese metallurgist
- Gordon King (gynaecologist) (1900–1991), known as Wang Guodong in China and Hong Kong
