= Razavi =

Razavi may refer to:

- Razavi (surname)
- Razavi Khorasan Province, province in northeastern Iran
- Razavi, Gonabad, village in Razavi Khorasan Province, Iran
