= Bishop Douglass =

Bishop Douglass may refer to:

- Bishop Douglass Catholic School, in the London Borough of Barnet
- John Douglass (bishop) (1743–1812), English Roman Catholic bishop
