= Wendy Savage =

British gynaecologist

Professor Wendy Diane Savage FRCOG
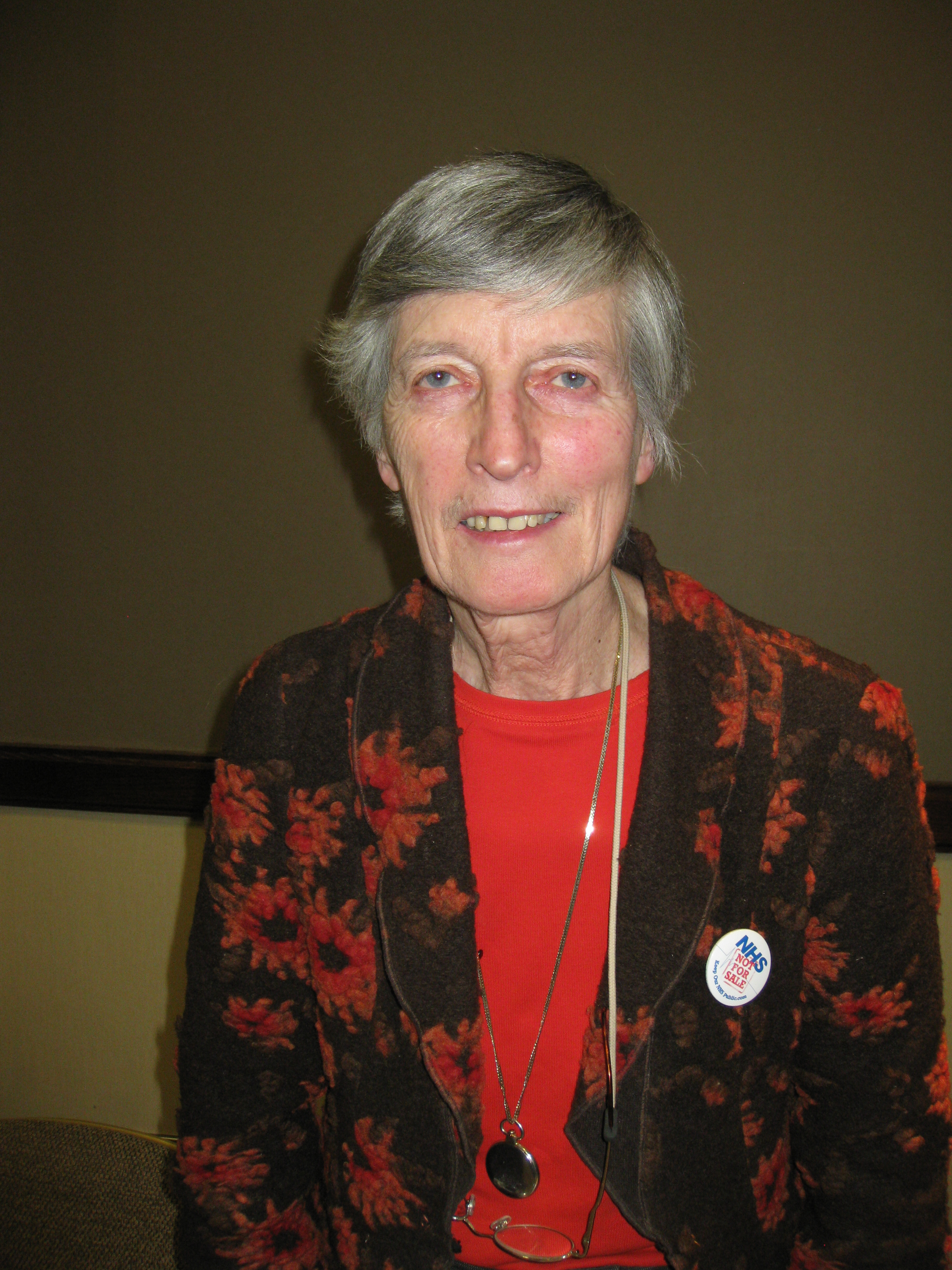
- Education: London Hospital Medical College
- Alma mater: Girton College, Cambridge
- Scientific career
- Fields: Obstetrics, Gynaecology, Family planning, Venereal disease, Abortion
- Institutions: Mile End Hospital, London Hospital Medical College, Royal London Hospital, Tower Hamlets Health Authority

Wendy Diane Savage (born 12 April 1935 in Surrey) is a British gynaecologist, and advocate and campaigner of women's rights in childbirth and fertility.

Professor Savage read medicine at Girton College, Cambridge. She qualified in 1960, and was the first woman consultant to be appointed in obstetrics and gynaecology at The London Hospital. She has worked in the United States of America, Nigeria, Kenya, and New Zealand. In New Zealand she set up an abortion service before the law was liberalised. She was an elected member of the General Medical Council for more than 16 years. She was shortlisted for the BMJ Group Lifetime Achievement Award in 2009.

In 1985, she was accused of incompetence by the professor in her department (Professor Jurgis Gediminas Grudzinskas) and suspended from her post at the London Hospital Medical College, but she was cleared of all charges and reinstated in 1986 following a high-profile enquiry. A British Medical Journal editorial concluded that a clash of personalities had led to the charges against Dr Savage.

"Mrs Savage's strongly held and voiced opinions on women's rights to a say in their method of delivery and in their rights to abortion made her a public and at times controversial figure; rumours of other sources of conflict with her colleagues have ranged from style of dress to private practice."

Savage was supported during this time by other birth activists such as Beverley Lawrence Beech. Savage herself wrote about her experiences. Her later book, Birth and Power, revisits the issues which her suspension raised. In 1991 she made an extended appearance on the television discussion programme After Dark alongside Helen Brook, John Finnis, Mary Kenny and others.

She was co-chair of the pressure group Keep Our NHS Public. She is a publicly elected Governor for Islington in the Camden and Islington NHS Foundation Trust, and was further elected by her fellow Governors to serve on the Remuneration and Nominations committee, which then chose her as chair of that committee. She was also elected by Governors to serve on the Council of Governors' Steering Committee.

In 2018 she was awarded the BMJ Award for Outstanding Contribution to Health.

== 2017 views on terminations ==
Professor Savage was interviewed by The Mail on Sunday in March 2017. Professor Savage was described as saying people should be allowed to have an abortion at any stage of a pregnancy and abortion pills should be available online without the need to see a doctor or nurse. She stressed that abortion beyond 24 weeks is very rare. Professor Savage was further quoted as saying there is no evidence that sex-selective abortion is a problem in the UK and that, consequently, policies to not tell expectant mothers in the UK the sex of the foetus are unnecessary. She was further quoted as arguing that forcing women to give birth to a child of a sex they do not want "is not going to be good for the eventual child, and it's not going to be good for mental health."

Conservative MP Mark Field was quoted by The Mail on Sunday as calling Professor Savage's views (as put to him by the paper) "extreme" and told the newspaper: "Suggesting that women should be able to abort babies solely because they happen to be either male or, much more usually, female, is utterly abhorrent. Globally, sex-selective abortion is thought to have led to millions of girls being aborted, and both the United Nations and the World Health Organisation have campaigns to stamp it out."

The British Pregnancy Advisory Service (BPAS) informed The Independent (which wrote about the story) that it was "totally appalled" by The Mail on Sunday's front page "demonising Wendy Savage, a doctor who has devoted her life to supporting pregnant women." The Independent further quoted BPAS as saying: "Wendy believes women should not be prosecuted for causing their own abortion with pills bought online. We agree and so do two thirds of the public. We stand by Wendy Savage and are forever grateful for all she has done for pregnant women over a career spanning decades."

== Selected publications ==
- A Savage Enquiry. Virago. 1986. ISBN 978-0-86068-859-4.
- Birth and Power: A Savage Enquiry Revisited. Middlesex University Press. 2007. ISBN 978-1-904750-58-1.
