= Irene Leigh =

British dermatologist

Irene May Leigh CBE FRSE FMedSci is a British dermatologist. She is an emeritus Professor of Cellular and Molecular medicineBarts and The London School of Medicine and Dentistry. Her research has focused on keratinocytes, non-melanoma skin cancers and genetic skin diseases. She was elected to the Academy of Medical Sciences in 1999 and appointed CBE in 2012.

== Biography ==
Born in Liverpool, Leigh completed her medical studies at the London Hospital Medical College. After qualifying, she specialised in dermatology. During her specialist training, she lectured in medicine at the University of Dar es Salaam in Tanzania for two years. She returned to London afterwards to complete her registrar training, and was appointed a consultant dermatologist to the Royal London Hospital in 1983. The same year, she set up a research laboratory at the hospital; she was also a research fellow at the Cancer Research UK London Research Institute, and was awarded an MD degree. Her research laboratory, the Centre for Cutaneous Research, became a national leader in skin biology research, and in 1992 Leigh was appointed professor of dermatology at Barts and The London School of Medicine and Dentistry. She received a DSc degree and was elected to the Academy of Medical Sciences in 1999. She was made professor of cell and molecular medicine at Barts and The London in 1999 and held the positions of research dean (1997–2002) and research director (2002–2005).

In 2006, Leigh moved to the University of Dundee School of Medicine, where she was the head of the College of Medicine, Dentistry and Nursing, a vice-principal of research, and chair of cellular and molecular medicine. She was appointed OBE in 2006 and CBE in 2012. She was also awarded the Archibald Gray Medal, the highest honour of the British Association of Dermatologists, in 2012.She returned to QMUL as Professor Cellular and Molecular Medicine and Interim Dean of Dentistry in 2018 and became International Dean for Medicine and Dentistry in 2019-2022. She acted as Interim Director of Institute of Population Health in 2020-21 and Interim Vice Principal for health in 2021. She is currently continuing research into Squamous Cell Carcinoma as part of the Barts Centre for Squamous Cancer, generously funded by Barts Charity.

== Research ==
Leigh's research focus has been keratinocytes, a type of skin cell. She has studied the role of keratin in non-melanoma skin cancers and hereditary skin diseases, and discovered that numerous genetic diseases of the skin are caused by mutations in keratin, plectin, desmosomal proteins and connexins. Her research group also showed that human papillomavirus plays an oncogenic role in non-melanoma skin cancers. In her early career, she helped to identify the cause of recessive dystrophic epidermolysis bullosa and develop a monoclonal antibody for diagnosis of the condition.
