= Kathryn Colvin =

British diplomat

Kathryn Frances Colvin CVO DStJ (born 11 September 1945) is a British diplomat who, since 2015, serves as a Special Representative of HM Secretary of State for Foreign and Commonwealth Affairs.

== Life ==
The daughter of Ernest Osborne, she was educated at Walthamstow Hall, Sevenoaks, before going up to the University of Bristol (BA (Hons)), then Bordeaux University (Diplôme d'Etudes Supérieures) and was elected a Fellow of the Institute of Linguists (FCIL) in 1968.

She joined the Foreign Office in 1968, and spent the period 1968–1994 in the Information Research Department (known from 1977 as the Information and Analysis Department). From 1980 to 1990 she was a member of the United Kingdom delegation to the Office of the United Nations High Commissioner for Human Rights in Geneva.

In 1994 Colvin was promoted Deputy Head of the OSCE Department, 1995–1998 of the West Europe Department, and 1998–1999 of the Whitehall Liaison Department.

From 1999 to 2002 she was Her Majesty's Vice-Marshal of the Diplomatic Corps, a senior member of the Royal Household and the Queen's link with the diplomatic community in London. The role involved arranging the annual Diplomatic Corps Reception by the Sovereign, organising the regular presentation of credentials ceremonies for Ambassadors and High Commissioners, and supervising attendance of diplomats at State events.

Colvin served as HM Ambassador to the Holy See 2002 thru 2005. Since 2007, she serves on the Honours and Awards Committee of the Most Venerable Order of Saint John.

She was appointed Officer of the Legion of Honour in 1996, CVO in 2002, and Dame of the Order of St John in 2024.

In 1971 she married Professor Brian Colvin with whom she lives in Chislehurst, London.
