= Denise Sheer =

Professor of human genetics

- Born: Johannesburg, South Africa
- Education: University of Oxford
- Known for: Cancer Genetics, Genome Biology
- Scientific career
- Fields: Human Genetics
- Workplaces: Institute of Cell and Molecular Science, Barts and The London, Queen Mary's School of Medicine and Dentistry

Denise Sheer was appointed professor of human genetics at The Institute of Cell and Molecular Science at Queen Mary, University of London in November 2006. Her fields of expertise include cell and molecular biology; cancer genetics and epigenetics; and molecular pathology of paediatric brain tumours.

== Education and career ==
Sheer completed a BSc (Hons) degree in embryology and zoology at the University of the Witwatersrand, Johannesburg in 1973, after which she ran the diagnostic cytogenetics laboratory at the South African Institute of Medical Research for two years.

She then moved to the genetics laboratory of the University of Oxford, where she was awarded a D.Phil. in 1980. She completed a post-doctoral research fellowship at the Imperial Cancer Research Fund (now the Cancer Research UK London Research Institute) and became head of the Human Cytogenetics Laboratory from 1983 to 2006. Here her work involved the identification of significant genetic aberrations in many malignant cancers and she made critical discoveries on chromosome architecture.

In 2006 she moved with her research group to the Blizard Institute in the Centre for Genomics and Child Health at Barts and The London, Queen Mary's School of Medicine and Dentistry.

The Blizard Building.

Her current research is an interventional clinical trial studying the treatment of young patients with recurrent or refractory low grade glioma, due for completion in 2020. The group received the Jeremy Jass Prize for Excellence in Pathology for this work.

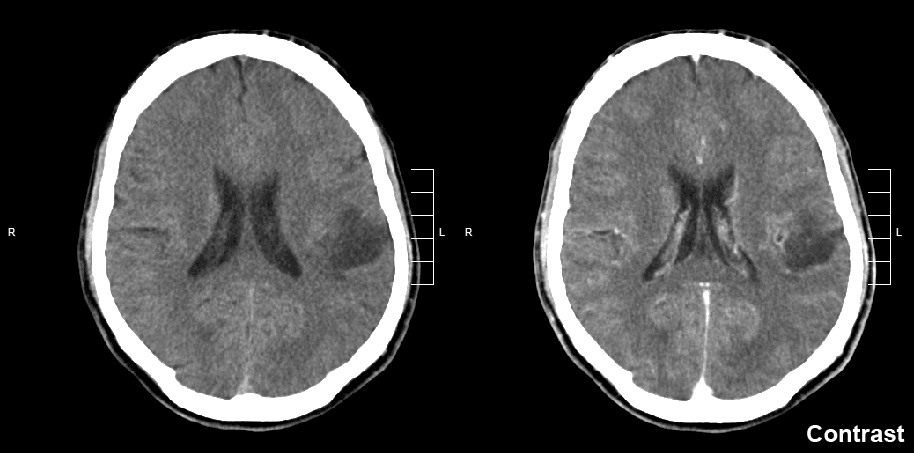
Glioma of the left parietal lobe. CT scan with contrast enhancement.

Sheer has 273 publications and 11,000 citations listed on ResearchGate and almost 15,000 citations listed on Google Scholar. The work done by Sheer and her group has been funded by The Brain Tumour Charity since 2013 and she won the Research Engagement Award at The Brain Tumour Charity Celebrating You Awards
