= Gordon King =

Gordon King is the name of:

- Gordon King (gynaecologist) (1900–1991), English gynaecologist
- Gordon Grimsley King (1918–2009), Australian Army officer
- Gordon King (American football) (born 1956), American football player
