= Mark Caulfield =

British genomic medicine researcher (born 1960)

Sir Mark Jonathan Caulfield FRCP FMedSci (born 19 July 1960) is a British genomic medicine researcher and warden of Barts and The London School of Medicine and Dentistry. He is the professor of clinical pharmacology at the William Harvey Research Institute in Queen Mary University of London. He was awarded a knighthood in the 2019 Birthday Honours.

== Early life and education ==
Caulfield was born in 1960. His Irish parents raised him in North London. He attended Bishop Douglass School in Finchley and London Hospital Medical College where he graduated with a degree in medicine in 1984. With his medical degree, Caulfield trained at St Bartholomew's Hospital where he developed a research programme in molecular genetics of hypertension.

== Career ==
In 2002, Caulfield was appointed as the director of the William Harvey Research Institute at Queen Mary University of London. While there, he was elected to the Academy of Medical Sciences and awarded the Lilly Prize of the British Pharmacological Society. From 2009 until 2011, Caulfield also served as president of the British Hypertension Society, while also directing the National Institute for Health Research (NIHR) Bart’s Biomedical Research Centre.

In 2013, Caulfield was appointed as chief scientist for Genomics England, a non-profit company run through the Department of Health. He was charged with the scientific strategic oversight and delivery of the 100,000 Genomes Project which is a healthcare transformation applying whole genome sequencing to rare disease, cancer, and infection. ".

By 2014, Caulfield was reported to be a Highly Cited Researcher as determined by Thomson Reuters. A few years later, he received the Franz Volhard Award and Lectureship for Outstanding Research by the International Society of Hypertension. By 2018, Caulfield was reported to be one the top “influential researchers” in the world.

Caulfield was awarded a knighthood in the 2019 Birthday Honours. He also agreed to act as interim chief executive of Genomics England following the department of John Mattick.

In 2022, Sir Mark was appointed as vice-principal health for Queen Mary, University of London. He is also the Warden of Bart’s and The London School of Medicine and Dentistry.

== Personal life ==
Caulfield married his wife Fran in 1991 and they have two daughters together. Sarah studied at University of Nottingham and is a practising veterinary surgeon, and Rachel studied medicine at University of Bristol. In a June 2017 interview he claimed to be a workaholic with few hobbies, aside from walking, particularly in Germany, playing golf "badly" and gardening "often unsuccessfully".
