= Pamela Evans =

British author

Pamela Evans (born 1949) is a British author who is also trained as a medical doctor and a published academic.

Evans was born in London and trained as a doctor at The London Hospital Medical College, graduating with an MB BS. After graduating, she worked as a General Practitioner in Highams Park, London E4.

== Academic career ==
Pamela took up a post as a research fellow in epidemiology to enable her to continue working whilst raising a family. She was a member of the UK national working party concerned with data recording in cerebral palsy research from 1985 to the early 1990s. She has published various papers in the field and was invited to deliver a paper at a UCLA conference ('Epidemiology of the Cerebral Palsies: a Foundation for Research and Prevention') in 1986.

She developed the "Limb by Limb" method of data recording, a standardised methodology for clinicians providing data to epidemiologists. Before this method was described, different interpretations of commonly used terms (e.g. diplegia, hemiplegia and quadriplegia) meant that data recorded in studies were not always able to be assessed correctly at an epidemiological level. The "Limb by Limb" method stimulated a debate among other researchers about the best format for data recording in epidemiological studies, providing a basis from which other recording methodologies could be derived.

Her work on the life expectancy of children affected by cerebral palsy has been used as evidence in the High Court.

== Writings ==
She left her epidemiological studies and developed an interest in counselling and to begin to teach adults in her local church and elsewhere. She contributed to the training of Christian counsellors, and lectured GPs on workaholism and other addictions. This work culminated in "Driven Beyond the Call of God" which received good reviews including from the Christian Medical Fellowship – connecting her past career as a doctor to her present one as an author.

In 2002 she compiled her New Testament church-based teaching on the Body of Christ into a second book – "Building the Body" and has since contributed to the "Quiet Spaces" journal and bible reading notes such as "Living Light" and "Closer to God" from Scripture Union.

In 2011 she published her 3rd book – "Shaping the Heart", subtitled "Reflections on spiritual formation and fruitfulness".

== Current activities ==
Pamela Evans continues to teach and preach in the Anglican church to which she and her husband belong. She is a member of the Association of Christian Writers and part of the Chichester Diocese team of facilitators for the national Growing Healthy Churches initiative. She also provides spiritual direction to a small number of church leaders.
