= Siew C. Ng =

Hong Kong-based clinician-scientist

Professor Ng Siew Chien
- 黃秀娟
- Born: Penang, Malaysia
- Education: Imperial College London (PhD), Barts and The London School of Medicine and Dentistry (MBBS)
- Occupation(s): Clinician-scientist, Gastroenterologist
- Years active: 2010–present
- Known for: Research in Inflammatory bowel disease, Fecal microbiota transplant, Colorectal cancer, Endoscopy, and Gut microbiota
- Title: Croucher Professor in Medical Sciences, Associate Dean (Research), Department of Medicine and Therapeutics
- Children: 2
- Awards: Highly Cited Researcher (2020–2024), Academia Europaea Foreign Member (2024), Bank of China Hong Kong Science and Technology Prize (Life and Health) (2024)
- Scientific career
- Fields: Gastroenterology
- Institutions: The Chinese University of Hong Kong, Imperial College London

Siew C. Ng
- Traditional Chinese: 黃秀娟
- Simplified Chinese: 黄秀娟
Transcriptions
Standard Mandarin
- Hanyu Pinyin: Huáng Xiùjuān
Yue: Cantonese
- Yale Romanization: Wòng Sáu Gwān
- Jyutping: Wong4 Sau3 Gyun1

Ng Siew Chien (Chinese: 黃秀娟; Jyutping: Wong4 Sau3 Gyun1) is a Malaysian-born clinician-scientist and gastroenterologist based in Hong Kong. She holds the Croucher Professorship in Medical Sciences at The Chinese University of Hong Kong (CUHK), known for research in inflammatory bowel disease (IBD) and gut microbiota. She has led international studies on IBD epidemiology in the Asia-Pacific region, publishing over 400 peer-reviewed papers in journals such as Nature, Nature Medicine, and The Lancet. Ng has been recognized as a Highly Cited Researcher by Clarivate since 2020 and elected a Foreign Member of Academia Europaea in 2024.

== Education ==
Ng obtained her Bachelor of Medicine and Surgery (MBBS) degree from St Bartholomew's and the Royal London School of Medicine and Dentistry in 2000. She completed her Doctor of Philosophy (PhD) degree at Imperial College London in 2009.

== Career ==
Ng joined The Chinese University of Hong Kong in 2010, serving as Croucher Professor in Medical Sciences and Associate Dean (Research) in the Faculty of Medicine. She is the Director of the Microbiota I-Center (MagIC), focusing on utilizing the human gut microbiome for the development of novel microbial biomarkers and personalised microbiome therapeutics. She has collaborated with over 20 countries and 30 centers in the Asia-Pacific on IBD studies.

== Research ==
Ng’s research addresses inflammatory bowel disease (IBD), gut microbiota, and therapies like fecal microbiota transplantation. Her studies have improved understanding of IBD trends in Asia. Ng has identified microbial signatures for IBD and autism spectrum disorder, leading to non-invasive diagnostic tests, including one granted Breakthrough Device Designation by the U.S. Food and Drug Administration in 2024 for autism diagnosis in at-risk children. Her work extends to colorectal cancer and post-acute COVID-19, supporting long COVID treatments.

== Awards and recognition ==
Ng was elected a Foreign Member of Academia Europaea in 2024. That year, she received the Bank of China Hong Kong Science and Technology Innovation Prize (Life and Health). In October 2023, she became the first Hong Kong New Cornerstone Investigator in Biology and Biomedical Sciences. Ng has been a Highly Cited Researcher by Clarivate since 2020 and received Croucher Senior Medical Fellowships in 2020.
