= Brian Colvin =

British haematologist (born 1946)

Brian Trevor Colvin (born 17 January 1946) is a British haematologist.

== Education ==
Colvin attended Sevenoaks School, and then Clare College, Cambridge, where he attained MA and MB BChir degrees. He completed his medical education at London Hospital Medical College.

== Career ==
=== Medical and academic positions ===
Colvin was consultant haematologist at St Peter's Hospital and Institute of Urology 1977-86, and at Barts and the London Hospital 1977-2009. He was director of postgraduate medical and dental education at the Royal Hospitals NHS Trust, London 1996-99, and Dean of Queen Mary's School of Medicine and Dentistry 1998-2008. He has been appointed honorary professor at Queen Mary College. He was director of the company Clinical Pathology Accreditation Ltd 1998-2004, and since 2008 has been medical director (haemophilia) at Pfizer Europe.

=== Memberships of professional bodies ===
His memberships include: Fellow of the Royal College of Pathologists (RCPath) (since 1988), Fellow of the Royal Society of Medicine (RSM) (1989-2008), and Fellow of the Royal College of Physicians (since 1990). He was the founder director and company secretary of the European Association for Haemophilia, and first author of the European principles of haemophilia care. He has served on various committees including the Medical Advisory Committee of the UK Haemophilia Society (1993-2007), and chaired the Haemostasis and Thrombosis Sub-Committee of the British Committee for Standards in Haematology (1991–94); the Steering Committee of the UK National External Quality Assurance Scheme in Blood Coagulation (1992–96 and 2005–11); the Panel of Examiners in Haematology at the RCPath (1994–99); the National Quality Assurance Advisory Panel in Haematology (1996–98); and the Ethics Committee of the RCPath (2004–08). He was president of the Council of the Pathology Section of the RSM (1996–98), and of the Barts and The London Alumnus Association (2007–11).

== Awards ==
In 2012 Colvin was awarded the Queen Mary College Medal.

== Publications ==
Colvin is the author of 59 published papers and 14 books and chapters related to haematology.
