= Razavi (surname) =

Razavi (Persian: رضوی, romanized: Razavi) is a Persian surname from the Arabic adjective رضوي (ALA-LC: Raḍawī) meaning "of Rida" or "Reza" (Persian: رضا) in Persian. The Urdu version of this name is Rizvi.

Razavi is the surname of:

- Abbas Razavi (born 1944), retired Iranian footballer
- Behzad Razavi (contemporary), Iranian-American professor
- Shahra Razavi (contemporary), Iranian-born academic
- Reza Razavi (contemporary), professor
- Mansour Razavi (contemporary), Iranian engineer and politician
- Melika Razavi (born 1989) Iranian-South African beauty queen, magician and professional poker player
- Atefeh Razavi (born 1969), Iranian actress and make-up artist
- Sam Razavi (born 1980), English professional poker player and actor
- Bita Razavi (born 1983), contemporary artist
- Ahmad Razavi (1906–1971), Iranian engineer and politician
- Noureddin Razavi Sarvestani (1935–2000), Iranian vocalist
- Nicole Razavi (born 1965), German politician
