= James Calder (orthopaedic surgeon) =

British orthopaedic surgeon

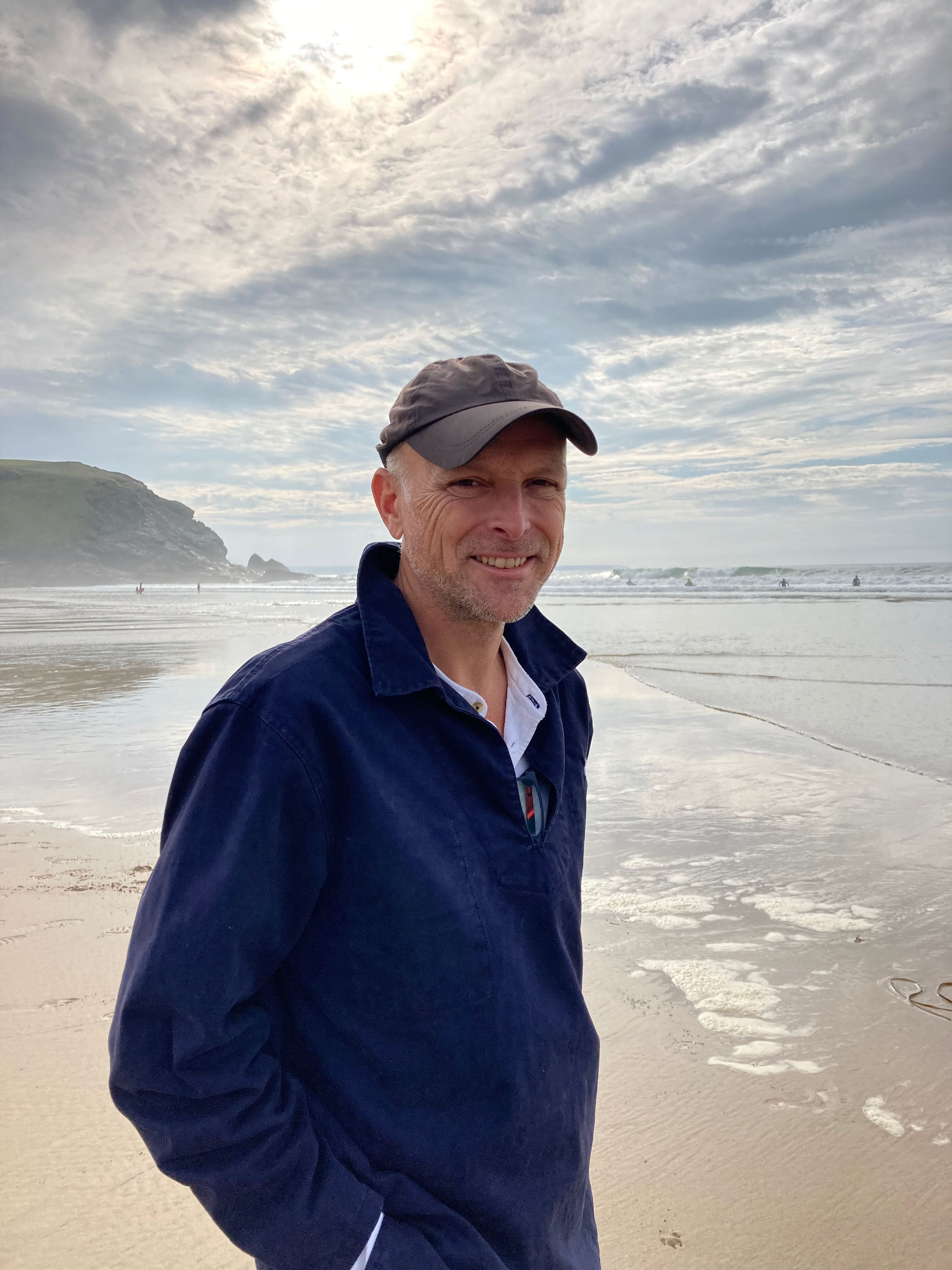
- Born: James David Forbes Calder; 22 February 1968 (age 58); England
- Education: London Hospital Medical College
- Occupation: Orthopaedic surgeon
- Medical career
- Institutions: Royal College of Surgeons; Chelsea and Westminster Hospital; University of Amsterdam; Royal College of Physicians of Ireland; Royal College of Surgeons in Ireland; Royal College of Physicians and Surgeons of Glasgow
- Sub-specialties: Sporting injuries

James David Forbes Calder OBE TD (born 22 February 1968) is a British orthopaedic surgeon specialising in sporting injuries. He has treated foot and ankle injuries in football players from the English Premier League and European clubs including Paris St Germain, AC Milan, Barcelona FC, Real Madrid, Olympique de Marseille in addition to rugby players from England, Ireland, Scotland and Wales, GB Olympic teams, England and Indian cricket teams and UK Athletics.

== Early life and education ==
After attending The Leys School in Cambridge, Calder graduated from the London Hospital Medical College in 1991 and awarded FRCSEng in 1995. He was awarded the Laming Evans Research Fellowship from the Royal College of Surgeons in England studying the histochemical effects of avascular necrosis and awarded a Doctorate of Medicine from London University in 2001 and FRCS(Tr & Orth) the same year. He continued his training in Australia with a foot and ankle fellowship for a year and subsequently in the USA following the award of a travelling Fellowship from the American Academy of Orthopaedic Surgeons.

Calder was made a Fellow of the Faculty of Sports and Exercise Medicine, Royal College of Surgeons in Edinburgh in 2007 and in 2017 he was awarded a PhD by the University of Amsterdam. His thesis was titled "Advances in the Management of Ankle Injuries in Athletes".

In the same year, he was conferred the Fellowship of Faculty of Sports and Exercise Medicine (FFSEM) by the Royal College of Physicians of Ireland and the Royal College of Surgeons in Ireland, in recognition of support for Irish athletes and research into sporting injuries; and the Fellowship of the Royal College of Physicians and Surgeons of Glasgow.

== Military and humanitarian work ==
Calder saw military service in Northern Ireland, the Balkans and Middle East. He continued an interest in humanitarian aid through the Leonard Cheshire Centre for Conflict Relief and he worked in Sri Lanka following the tsunami in 2004 and subsequently assisted medical aid workers in the Pakistan earthquake of 2005.

== Career and research ==
Calder was appointed a consultant in trauma and orthopaedic surgery at the North Hampshire Hospital in 2003 and subsequently at the Chelsea and Westminster Hospital, London in 2008. He is Professor in the Department of Bioengineering at Imperial College, London where he leads the Sports Injury Research Group. He was appointed honorary consultant advisor in sports and performing arts to UK Health Security Agency in 2020.

He remains involved in research and teaching collaborating with universities in USA, Europe and Singapore. He has authored and edited several books, chapters and original papers related to the advancement of understanding sporting foot and ankle, tendon and cartilage injuries. Calder was president of ESSKA-AFAS and on the Board of the European Society for Sports Traumatology, Knee Surgery and Arthroscopy (ESSKA), is on the committee of the International Cartilage Research Society and former chairman of the International Achilles Tendon Study Group. He co-founded the Fortius Clinic, London. He is on the Editorial Board of the Journal of Cartilage and Joint Preservation and former Associate Editor of the Bone and Joint Journal and the Knee Surgery, Sports Traumatology and Arthroscopy (KSSTA) Journal.

Calder was appointed Officer of the Order of the British Empire (OBE) in the 2020 New Year Honours for services to sport and exercise.

== Concussion in sport ==
The DCMS Select Committee inquiry into concussion in sport published its findings in July 2021 and the UK Government recommended the development of standard protocols for the management of concussion. It was estimated that approximately 30 million people participated regularly in sport with 700,000 sport-related concussions across the UK each year. The Minister for Sport, Stuart Andrew MP, appointed Calder Chair of the committee of domestic and international experts to produce guidelines in the Government's Action Plan on Concussion. This resulted in the landmark publication of the first UK-wide Concussion Guidance for Grassroots Sport in April 2023. It built on previous Scottish guidance using the strapline "If in doubt, sit them out". The Guidance was supported by the devolved governments in Northern Ireland, Scotland and Wales and the Chief Medical Officers across all four nations and adopted by sports National Governing Bodies, the National Health Service, schools and the medical Royal Colleges. Announcement of the Guidance received a positive response across stakeholders and the public, with Sir Chris Whitty, Chief Medical Officer for England and Chief Medical Advisor to the UK Government recognising that it helped "players, referees, schools, parents and others balance the substantial health and social benefits and enjoyment from taking part in sport with minimising the rare but serious and potentially lifelong effects of concussion".

Calder continued to chair UK Government groups co-ordinating research and the development of innovation and technology in concussion and traumatic brain injuries. In February 2024 he launched the UK guidance jointly with the Australian and New Zealand Governments through the Australian Institute of Sport, the Australian Sports Commission and the New Zealand Accident Compensation Corporation. Calder presented the UK Guidance to the Dutch Health Ministry and in 2025 it was subsequently adopted across Holland by Netherlandse Sportstraad and Sportzorg.nl.

== COVID-19 pandemic ==
In March 2020, Calder was appointed clinical lead setting up the NHS Nightingale Hospital London. Early in the pandemic, the quest to increase ventilator capacity in the NHS led to the concept of converting the Excel Exhibition Centre into a 4000-bed critical care facility. The co-ordination of NHS, military and private sector workers which enabled the hospital to open for patients within 10 days was rightly praised but few patients actually used the facility. The O2 Arena became a training centre for NHS staff across London to teach the skills required to work in critical care but whether the Nightingale would have been able to staff the hospital had it become fully operational remains in doubt. There are disagreements as to whether the £500M spent setting up the seven Nightingale Hospitals across England should have been used elsewhere or whether they were an insurance policy that was not needed. The King's Fund concluded "There were undeniably some positives from the Nightingale experience. Staff who worked in these locations speak of less hierarchical working styles and rapid learning and improvement systems (including the use of bedside learning co-ordinators)". These were then taken back to their home organisations for the benefit of the wider NHS.

In April 2020, Calder was appointed independent chair of the Department of Digital, Culture, Media and Sport (DCMS) committee tasked with returning elite sport during the COVID-19 pandemic. The "Five Stage Model" developed by sports chief medical officers, UK Sport and the sports National Governing Bodies enabled elite sport to re-commence in May 2020. Calder was also medical advisor on the DCMS Entertainment and Events and Broadcasting groups.

Calder was appointed to the Sports Technology and Innovation Group by the Culture Secretary, Oliver Dowden MP CBE which aimed at returning fans to elite sports venues. He was subsequently made a scientific advisor on the Science Board for the Events Research Programme. This reported on the environmental and behavioural risk factors associated with the transmission of SARS-CoV-19 in more than 2 million participants at 31 pilot events across various sectors including sports, theatre, nightclubs and festivals.

Calder also co-ordinated various collaborative research studies aimed at assessing risks and dispelling myths surrounding COVID-19 transmission in sports and the culture sectors. A joint study between Imperial College London and Liverpool School of Tropical Medicine using live COVID-19 virus demonstrated that the risk of its transmission from shared use of sports equipment was very unlikely. This enabled recreational sports clubs to allow people to share tennis balls, footballs, crash mats and for golf clubs to allow green pins and bunker rakes to be used which was previously banned. Following the award of a UKRI research grant, Calder co-ordinated aerobiology experiments which were performed in the ultra clean-air of orthopaedic operating theatres. The researchers from Imperial College London and Bristol University investigated the potential for aerosol transmission of COVID-19 in professional and amateur singers, woodwind and brass instrument musicians and the effect of exercise on aerosol generation in elite and amateur athletes. The results have helped shape guidelines for several areas of the performing arts as well as gyms. This body of work was awarded the Faraday Horizon Prize by the Royal Society of Chemistry in June 2025.
