= Richard Pollok =

British gastroenterologist

Prof. Richard Pollok is a British gastroenterologist and academic. He is a Professor of Practice in Gastroenterology and Gastrointestinal Infection at St George's, University of London. He also serves as a consultant physician at St George's University Hospitals NHS Foundation Trust and is a visiting professor at Imperial College London. His research primarily revolves around inflammatory bowel disease (IBD) and gastrointestinal infection.

== Education ==
Pollok went to school at King's School, Canterbury, graduated from St Bartholomew’s Hospital Medical School in 1989. He has a BSc in Immunology (Imperial College) and Diploma of Tropical Medicine & Hygiene (Liverpool University). He trained in gastroenterology in north east London and received his PhD (Queen Mary University of London) for his work on gastrointestinal immunology. He was a Wellcome Trust clinical research fellow at St Bart’s before joining St George’s as a consultant in 2002. He is a Fellow of the Royal College of Physicians (London) and member of the British Society of Gastroenterology and European Crohn's and Colitis Organisation.

== Research work ==
Pollok’s research work is extensive and influential. He has over 200 peer-reviewed publications in high impact journals like The Lancet, JAMA, and Gastroenterology. He leads the POP-IBD research collaboration working with Sonia Saxena, Irene Pettersen, Alex Bottle and PMatthew Hotopf working with large national datasets evaluating the impact of medical treatment, associated comorbidities and environmental factors on clinical outcomes in IBD. His recent work has focused on pre-clinical IBD diagnosis and the importance of early diagnosis. He has been principal investigator for a wide range of clinical trials, both commercial and those funded/adopted by the National Institute for Health and Care Research and is gastroenterology lead for the Clinical Research Network/ Research Delivery network in south London. His research has impacted clinical guidelines for IBD and gastrointestinal infection.

As a clinician, Pollok undertakes consultation, endoscopy, service development and education at St George’s University Hospitals NHS Foundation Trust. He focuses on IBD, including the care of adolescents and young people with IBD who are moving from the paediatric service. He also has an interest in irritable bowel syndrome/ disorders of gut brain interaction and gastrointestinal-associated lymphoedema.
