= Beverley Lawrence Beech =

Welsh author (1944–2023)

Beech in 2021

Beverley Ann Lawrence Beech (12 November 1944 – 25 February 2023) was a Welsh author, chair of the Association for Improvements in the Maternity Services (AIMS) from 1977 to 2017 and an active campaigner against the medicalisation of pregnancy and birth. She raised awareness of the harm that can be done to women in obstetrics during labour and the importance of women being aware of their rights so they can make their own decisions about the place and manner of the birth of their children. She also counselled for a more positive attitude towards home births.

== Early life ==
Lawrence was born in Tenby, Wales. She was the oldest of four siblings. Her mother was Josephine née Wickland and her father was Charles Lawrence, a naval Lieutenant. She attended schools in Malta and Cornwall until the age of 16.

== Activism ==
After the traumatic experience of giving birth to her first son in 1972, involving a 36-hour labour which she later found out involved an artificial labour induction for no medical reason, Beech determined to act. She noticed a letter in The Times penned by Jean Robinson about the overuse of artificial induction and contacted the writer. Robinson suggested Beech join the Association for Improvements in the Maternity Services (AIMS). AIMS had been set up in 1960 by Sally Willington in order to support women in achieving the sort of birth they wanted. In 1977, Beech was elected chair of AIMS and continued as chair for the next 40 years, campaigning for improvements to maternity services in the UK.

Beech campaigned over several years for the restitution of midwife power and the institution of independent midwife units, for an evaluation of the common use of ultrasound research for enquiry into the widespread use of episiotomy, and, successfully, for the admission of fathers into maternity wards. She organised the first international conference on the topic of water birth. After her article on Normal Birth was published, a midwife called Soo Downe conducted research that showed that less than a sixth of first time mothers had a normal birth, that is a birth that starts spontaneously without drugs or intervention by doctors. This was a catalyst for the 2005 Campaign for Normal Birth by the Royal College of Midwives although this campaign has now been superseded by one calling for 'Better Births'.

Under Beech's chairwomanship, AIMS produced the 1997 Charter for Ethical Research in Maternity Care and noted a gradual shift in the discourse of articles and statements towards discussion of informed consent. Beech questioned, less successfully, the rapid increase in birth by Caesarean section, which stood at some 30% of all UK births in 2019. She successfully challenged the policy of chaining women prisoners to their beds during labour. She was supportive of health care professionals such as Wendy Savage who were vocal in their stand for women's reproductive rights.

Beech was a fellow of the Royal Society of Medicine, a lay advisor to the National Perinatal Epidemiology Unit, a lay member of the Royal College of Obstetricians and Gynaecologists Maternity Forum and of the Professional Conduct Committee of the Nursing and Midwifery Council (NMC) and a member of the Midwifery Committee of the NMC. She was also a founder member of CERES (Consumers for Ethics in Research). Beech was supportive of younger birth activists such as those in the organisation named When Push Comes to Shove.

== Personal life ==
Beverley Lawrence married Geoff Beech in 1968. They later divorced and she married Gavin Robertson in 2003. Robertson died in 2009. Beech is survived by two sons.

== Bibliography ==
- Beech, Beverley Lawrence (1991). Who's having your baby? : a health rights handbook for maternity care (2nd ed.). London: Bedford Square. ISBN 978-0719913228.
- Beech, Beverly A. Lawrence (2021). Am I allowed : what every woman should know before she gives birth (4th ed.). Edinburgh: Birth Practice and Politics Forum. ISBN 978-1916060609. This publication has been deemed useful for midwives and other professionals in the child birth team as well as for pregnant women.
- Beverly A. Lawrence Beech, ed. (1996). Water Birth Unplugged: Proceedings of the First International Water Birth Conference (1 ed.). Hale, Cheshire, England: Books for Midwives Press. ISBN 978-1-898507-53-6. OCLC 35829228.

=== Contributed chapters ===
- Beech, Beverley Lawrence (1992). "Women's View of Childbirth". In Chard, T.; Richard, M.P.N. (eds.). Obstetrics in the 1990's:Current Controversies. London: Mac Keith Press. pp. 153–166.
- Beech, Beverly Lawrence; Phipps, Belinda (2008). "Normal birth:Women's stories". In Downe, Soo (ed.). Normal childbirth : evidence and debate (2nd ed.). Edinburgh: Churchill Livingstone/Elsevier. pp. 67–81. ISBN 978-0-443-06943-7.
