= Dorothy Stuart Russell =

British pathologist

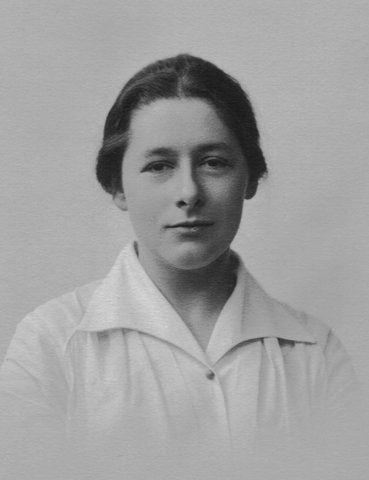
- Born: 29 June 1895; Sydney, Australia
- Died: 19 October 1983 (aged 88); Dorking, England
- Education: Girton College, Cambridge; London Hospital Medical College

Dorothy Stuart Russell (29 June 1895 – 19 October 1983) was an Australian born, British pathologist. She was a director of the Bernhard Baron Institute of Pathology.

== Life ==
Dorothy Stuart Russell was born in Sydney, Australia in 1895, the second daughter of Phillip Russell and his wife Alice Cave. After the death of her father in 1898, and then her mother in 1904, she and her sister were sent to be cared for by their father's sister at Fowlmere in England. She went to the Perse High School for Girls before going to the University of Cambridge, gaining a first class B.A. degree at Girton College in 1918.

== Medical studies ==
In 1918, Russell went on to study at the London Hospital Medical College (LHMC) where she discovered a mentor in Hubert Turnbull. Turnbull was the Professor of morbid anatomy and she was funded to work with him for some years. After qualifying in 1922, she pursued pathology studies. In 1928, Russell won a Rockefeller Scholarship and worked with Frank Mallory in Boston, and Wilder Penfield at the Montreal Neurological Institute. This year enabled her to move into a study of neuropathology. She graduated with her M.D. and the University Gold Medal in 1929.

Russell published A Classification of Bright's Disease in 1930, and she further expanded on this in her D.Sc. in 1943. From 1929, Russell worked closely with Hugh Cairns until around 1944, at the Medical Research Council. During the war she worked at Oxford University at the Military Hospital for Brain Injuries.

In 1944 she returned to the London Hospital Medical College where she took over many of the duties of Turnbull. She was made Professor of Morbid Pathology, the first woman to be appointed in this position, succeeding her mentor Professor Turnbull in 1946. She published her work, Observations on the Pathology of Hydrocephalus in 1949. Russell published her work with Lucien Rubinstein, The pathology of tumours of the nervous system, in 1959. She retired in 1960. She was appointed Emeritus Professor in 1960.

== Memberships ==
Russell was a Fellow of the Royal Society of Medicine. She was also a Fellow of the Royal Microscopical Society and Royal College of Physicians.

She won the Oliver Sharpey Prize of the Royal College of Physicians in 1968.

Russell died in Dorking in 1983.
