= Martin Gore (oncologist) =

British oncologist (1951–2019)

Professor Martin Gore CBE (February 1951 – 10 January 2019) was a leading British oncologist and cancer researcher. He was medical director of the Royal Marsden Hospital from 2006, and professor of cancer medicine at The Institute of Cancer Research.

Gore was the son of refugees who escaped the 1939 Invasion of Poland. He was educated at Bradfield College, where he proved himself to be a talented actor - brilliantly playing the sergeant in the 'C House' production of 'Reluctant Heroes' and, more notably, 'Shylock' in the school's production of 'The Merchant Of Venice'. He studied medicine at St Bartholomew's Hospital. He joined the Royal Marsden in 1981, becoming a consultant in 1989.

He authored or co-authored more than 500 academic papers, taking a particular interest in personalised medicine and bringing new therapies, such as targeted therapy and cancer immunotherapy, into the clinic.

He received a CBE for services to oncology in the Queen's birthday honours in 2016.

Gore died of total organ failure after receiving an inoculation against yellow fever.
