= Robert D. Acland =

Surgeon and academic

Robert Acland
- Born: Robert Dyke Acland; 20 June 1941; Exeter, England
- Died: 6 January 2016 (aged 74); Louisville, Kentucky, US
- Education: London Hospital Medical College
- Medical career
- Profession: surgeon
- Field: plastic and reconstructive surgery
- Institutions: University of Louisville
- Research: microsurgery, fresh tissue dissection
- Notable works: Acland's Video Atlas of Human Anatomy

Robert D. Acland, MBBS, FRCS (20 June 1941 – 6 January 2016) was a British surgeon and academic. A pioneer in plastic and reconstructive surgery, he was the younger son of Richard Acland and his wife Anne. He developed one of the first microsurgical instruments, the Acland micro-vessel clamp, as well as the 10-0 nylon sutures and needles that are still used today. He published the first edition of Acland's Practice Manual for Micro-vascular Surgery, also known as the "Red Book", a manual on microsurgical techniques (1997). The current edition was revised in 2008 and is still an essential tool for any trainee in microsurgical techniques and fundamentals of surgical microscopes and their use.

Acland was also a clinical anatomist and became a pioneer in the field of fresh tissue dissection. From 1981 to 2011, he established and ran the Fresh Tissue Anatomy Dissection Laboratory for surgeons and students at the University of Louisville.

Acland's major published work consists of the comprehensive Video Atlas of Human Anatomy. The video atlas depicts moving structures and pioneers new and highly effective techniques of anatomical videography for a clear three-dimensional understanding of spatial relationships. The unique dynamic and 3-D perspective was achieved using innovative camera rotation techniques pioneered at the University of Louisville School of Medicine.

== Early life and education ==
Robert Acland was born on 20 June 1941, in Exeter, England, to Richard Thomas Dyke Acland, the 15th baronet of Columb John, and Anne Alford. Although Richard Acland was a member of the landed gentry, he held left-wing political views; he was a Labour member of Parliament (MP) and one of the founders of the far-left Common Wealth Party, which promoted common ownership of land. In 1944 Richard Acland donated the ancestral estate of Killerton to the National Trust. Owned by the Aclands since the 17th century, Killerton consisted of a manor house and several thousand acres near Exeter. As they would not be able to rely on Killerton for financial support, Richard Acland told his sons that they would have to "make it on their own by being better, not by heredity."

Robert Acland grew up in the dower house at Killerton. He went to the village school and then to Bryanston School in Dorset, where he said he developed "a great interest in breaking rules." He had the opportunity to learn carpentry and welding at Bryanston, practical skills that he would later put to use as a surgeon.

Acland started at London Hospital Medical College (now Barts and The London School of Medicine and Dentistry) in 1959. After graduating in 1964, he did an internship at Bukumbi Hospital in Tanzania, where he built a Thomas splint (fraction splint) for a boy mauled by a lion. This experience heightened his interest in surgery and made him feel like he could use his hands to help people. Acland continued his medical training as a senior house officer (SHO) in Northampton, Mansfield and then took a SHO post in Oxford. In 1969 Acland spent a year as a senior registrar (Note: At the time, the term senior registrar referred to a doctor senior to a house officer but junior to a consultant.) in general surgery in Swindon, where his interest in microsurgery began after watching John Cobett perform a microvascular anastomosis. Acland was fascinated by the utmost surgical skill microsurgery required, and thought that the instrumentation then available was crude and could be improved upon. During his training in Swindon he began developing microsurgical instruments on the side but realized that to make any real progress he would need to research the problem full-time.

Acland applied for and received two years of funding from the Medical Research Council (MRC) to improve the instruments used in microsurgery. It was unusual for surgical trainees to receive MRC funding, and Acland suspected that the Scottish plastic surgeon Thomas Gibson may have played a part in approving his application. With this funding he returned to London Hospital in 1970, where he improved the tiny needles and thread used in microsurgery, invented the "Acland micro vessel clamp," and investigated how to prevent microthrombosis. He developed smaller needles and thread for microsurgery, making them himself. Acland realized that he needed to commercialize the process and initially approached Ethicon, then the largest suture manufacturer in Britain, with a proposal to do so. They thought microsurgery sutures would not sell well and turned him down. Acland then turned to Springler and Tritt, a startup suture company in southern Germany. Acland then trained as a registrar in plastic surgery at Canniesburn Hospital in Glasgow, Scotland, from 1972 to 1975.

== Career ==
While at Canniesburn Hospital, Acland performed meticulous microsurgery operations that could last up to 14 hours. The medical establishment at the NHS was displeased with him taking up so much time in the operating room, and he came to see that the NHS was not the place for his perfectionism. In 1975 he accepted an offer to set up a microsurgery teaching laboratory at the Kleinert-Kutz Hand Center in Louisville, Kentucky. The center had been founded by Harold E. Kleinert, a pioneering surgeon who was the first to use microsurgery to treat hand injuries, and his partner and fellow hand surgeon Joseph E. Kutz. Kleinert had also established the Christine M. Kleinert Fellowship in Hand Surgery in 1960 to give surgical residents more experience with hand surgery. He realized that the fellowship needed to improve its teaching of microsurgery, and invited Acland to set up a teaching laboratory at the suggestion of Graham Lister, a plastic surgeon who had joined Kleinert's practice and who had trained with Acland at Canniesburn Hospital.

Acland played a key role in the founding of the University of Louisville's fresh tissue dissection laboratory in 1981. A retired surgeon, Herbert Wald, asked Acland and two other surgeons, Harold Kleinert and Gordon Tobin, to help pay for a large walk-in refrigerator for unembalmed cadaver preservation. While it was immediately useful, Tobin thought that it resembled a dungeon cell, located as it was in the basement of a University of Louisville medical building. Acland was appointed director of the fresh tissue laboratory in 1983 upon Dr. Wald's full retirement, and under his leadership the laboratory was substantially expanded and improved. As director, Acland began to transition away from teaching microsurgery in favor of teaching anatomy.

=== Acland's Video Atlas of the Human Anatomy ===
Acland began making a video atlas of anatomy in the fall of 1993. Although he had been considering such a project for years, the immediate cause was a conversation he had with a medical student, Suzanne l'Ecuyer, at the University of Louisville, after giving a lecture on the importance of anatomy in clinical practice. His goal in producing the video atlas was to dissect lightly embalmed cadavers in order to preserve natural tissue appearance and demonstrate structures moving as they would in the living body. He also wanted to help students understand three-dimensional anatomical relationships by rotating the camera around specimens. Acland considered the project to be his personal "Sistine Chapel".

== Personal life ==
Acland was married three times and had four children. He married his first wife, Sarah Wood, in 1963. A fellow student at the London Hospital Medical College, she became a psychiatrist and accompanied him when he moved to the United States in 1975. They had two children together; Beatrice, born in 1966, and Daniel, born in 1969. He divorced Sarah in 1983 and that same year married Susan Bishop of Louisville, Kentucky. He had two children with her; Benjamin, born in 1985, and Emily, born in 1987. He divorced Susan in 1990. In 1992 he married Bette Levy, a respected local textile artist, to whom he was married until his death in 2016. According to Sarah, as of 2016 all three wives live in the Louisville area and get along well.

== Illness and death ==
Acland was diagnosed with cholangiocarcinoma, or bile duct cancer, in September 2014. He died on 6 January 2016, some 16 months later, at age 74.
