= Acland's Video Atlas of Human Anatomy =

Acland's Video Atlas of Human Anatomy is a series of anatomy lessons on video presented by Robert D. Acland. Dr. Acland was a professor of surgery in the division of plastic and reconstructive surgery at the University of Louisville School of Medicine. The Atlas was originally released as a series of VHS tapes, published individually between 1995 and 2003. The series was re-released in 2003 on DVD as Acland's DVD Atlas of Human Anatomy.

The series uses unembalmed human specimens to illustrate anatomical structures. Intended for use by medical, dental and medical science students, the video teaching aid uses simple language and high quality images.

The authors claim: "Each minute of the finished product took twelve hours to produce: five in creating the script, five in making the shots, and two in post-production."

== Contents ==
- Volume 1 - The Upper Extremity
- Volume 2 - The Lower Extremity
- Volume 3 - The Trunk (Musculoskeletal System)
- Volume 4 - The Head and Neck: Part 1
- Volume 5 - The Head and Neck: Part 2
- Volume 6 - The Internal Organs and Reproductive System

== Reception ==
The British Medical Journal wrote that "Robert Acland's video atlas series represents a powerful force against .. perceived dumbing down and has set about reinvigorating the subject through its crystal clear presentation of human anatomy."
