= Reza Razavi =

British academic

Reza Razavi is a British-Iranian professor of paediatric cardiovascular science, vice-president and vice-principal of research at the King's College London, the director of research at King's Health Partners, and the director of the King's Wellcome Trust EPSRC Centre For Medical Engineering.

== Career ==
Professor Rezavi obtained a degree in medicine at St. Bartholomew's Medical School, Barts and The London School of Medicine and Dentistry, Barts Health NHS Trust based in 1988, and later trained in the area of Paediatrics and Paediatric Cardiology. He was appointed as the Head of Division of Imaging Sciences and Biomedical Engineering between Jan 2007 and March 2017, as an Assistant Principal (Research & Innovation) between 2015 and 2017, and as a non-executive director on the Board of Guy's and St Thomas’ NHS Foundation Trust during 2016.

His research focuses in the area of cardiovascular diseases using imaging and biomedical engineering. It includes, but not limited to, cardiac magnetic resonance imaging (MRI) concerning congenital heart disease, electrophysiology and heart failure, image-guided intervention, X-ray and MRI based guided cardiac catheterisation, and methodological advancements for quicker cardiac imaging. He, along with his group, performed the first MRI-guided cardiac catheterisation in humans, and helped to establish the Trust's cardiovascular MRI service and developed the world's first cardiovascular MRI cardiac catheterisation programme.

== Memberships ==
2001–Present: Society of Cardiac MR Congenital Heart Disease Committee.

2001–Present: The British Society of Cardiac MR affiliated to the British Cardiac Society. He is a past chair of the British Society for Cardiovascular MRI.

Present: Governance Committer Academic Board member at the King's College London.

== Journal services ==
2001–Present: Heart

2001–Present: European Heart Journal

2001–Present: Circulation (Baltimore)

== Publications ==
Professor Reza Rezavi published his first research paper during the year 2000 titled "Pulmonary arterial thrombosis in a neonate with homozygous deficiency of antithrombin III: successful outcome following pulmonary thrombectomy and infusions of antithrombin III concentrate".

His most cited article is the "Percutaneous pulmonary valve implantation in humans: results in 59 consecutive patients" with over 450 citations.

Till today, Reza has published over 300 documents with more than 8,600 citations recorded by Scopus, and over 20,000 citations recorded by Google.
