= Letitia Clark =

Letitia Sarah Clark MBE, RRC
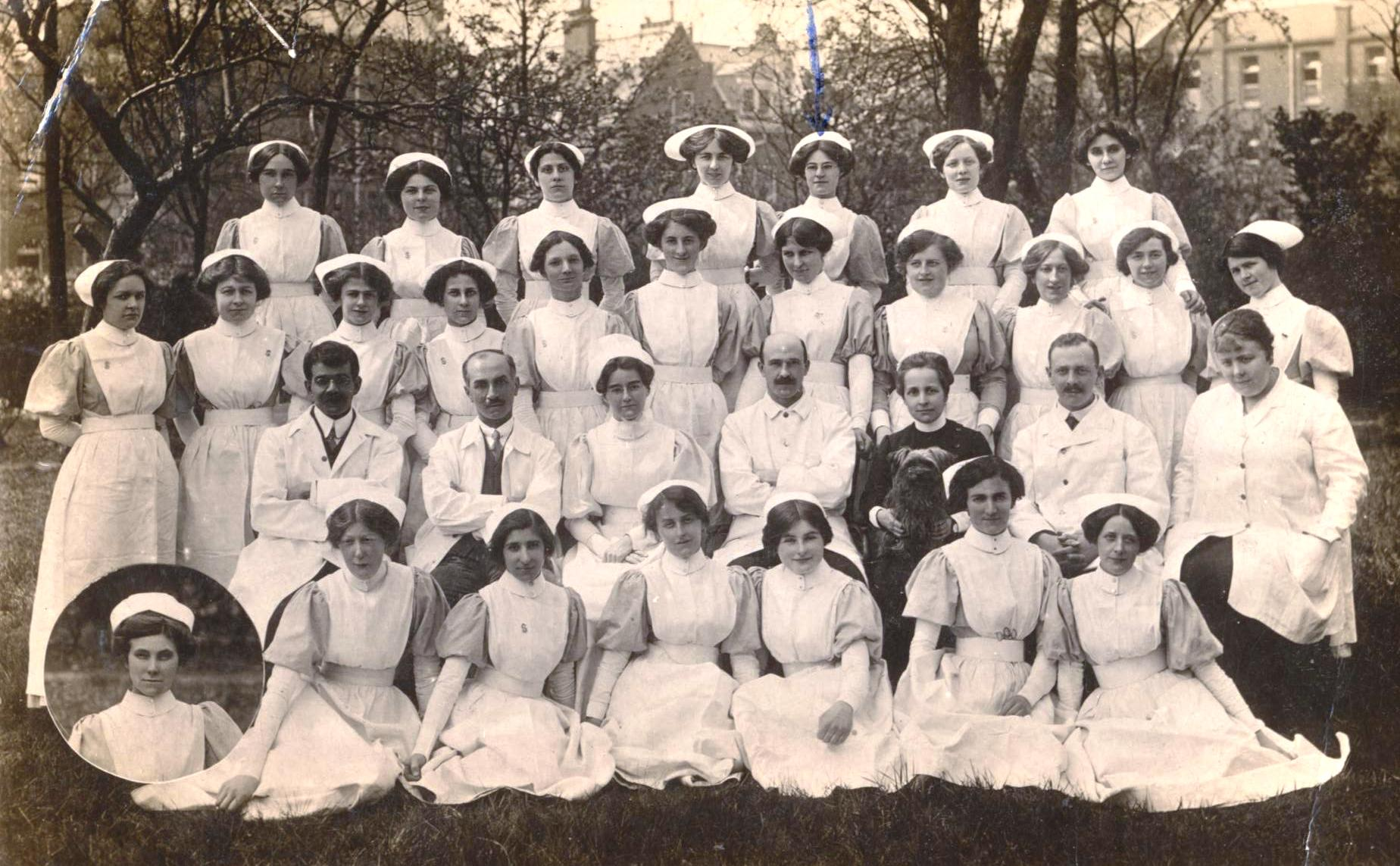
- Born: 1870; Mile End, London
- Died: 1939 (aged 68–69); Stroud, Gloucestershire
- Education: The London Hospital
- Occupation: Nursing Leader

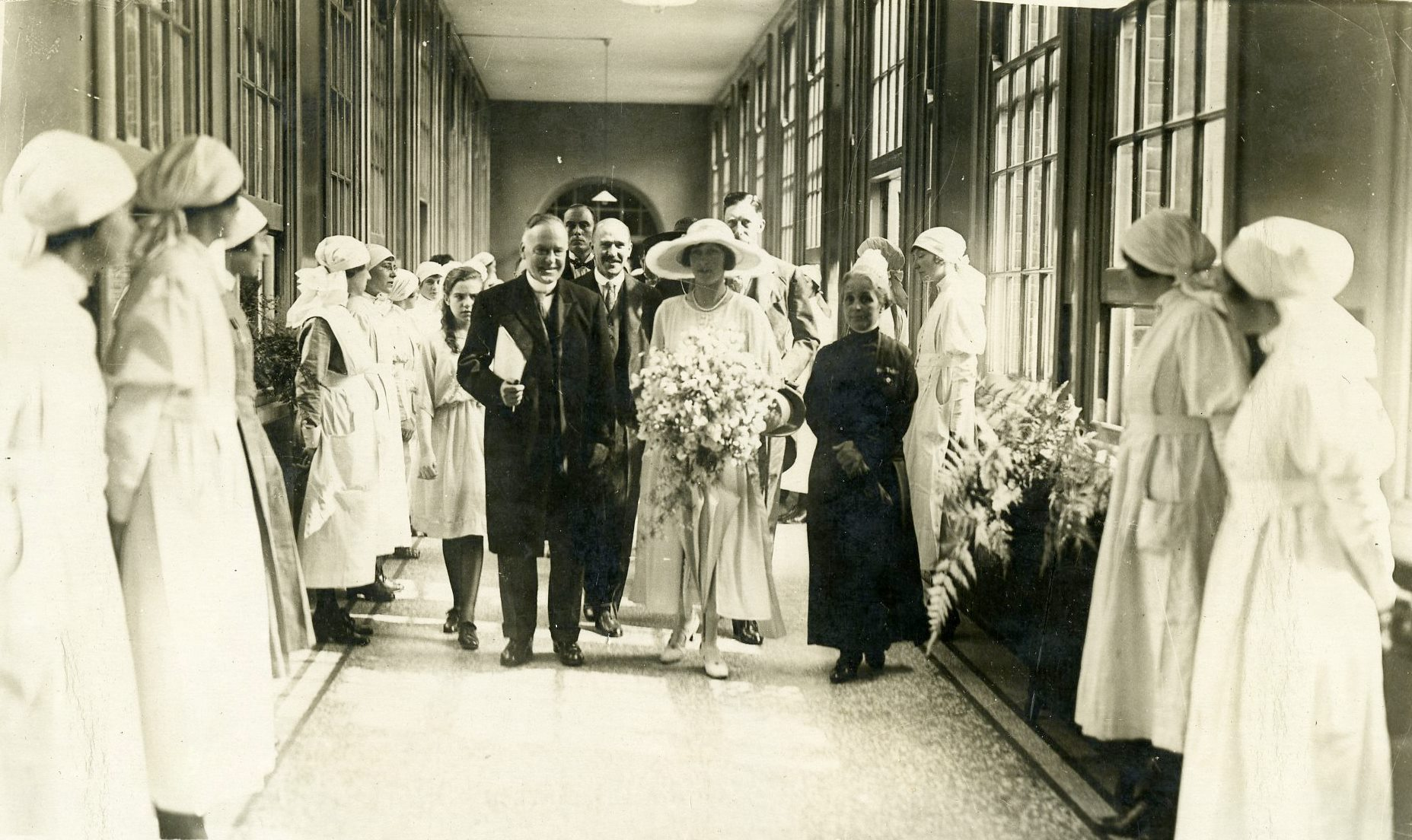
Letitia Clark with Princess Mary

Letitia Sarah Clark MBE, RRC (1870–1939) was a matron and nursing leader. She ran West Ham Union Infirmary, later Whipps Cross Hospital from 1907 for over 24 years. From 1917 she also ran Whipps Cross War Hospital. She was a founding member of the College of Nursing and a member of the college's governing council. She was a member of the General Nursing Council, and an advocate for the State Registration for nurses.

== Early life ==
Clark was born in Mile End, East London in 1870. She was the eldest child of ten born to her father Thomas, a dock clerk, and his wife Letitia.

== Career ==
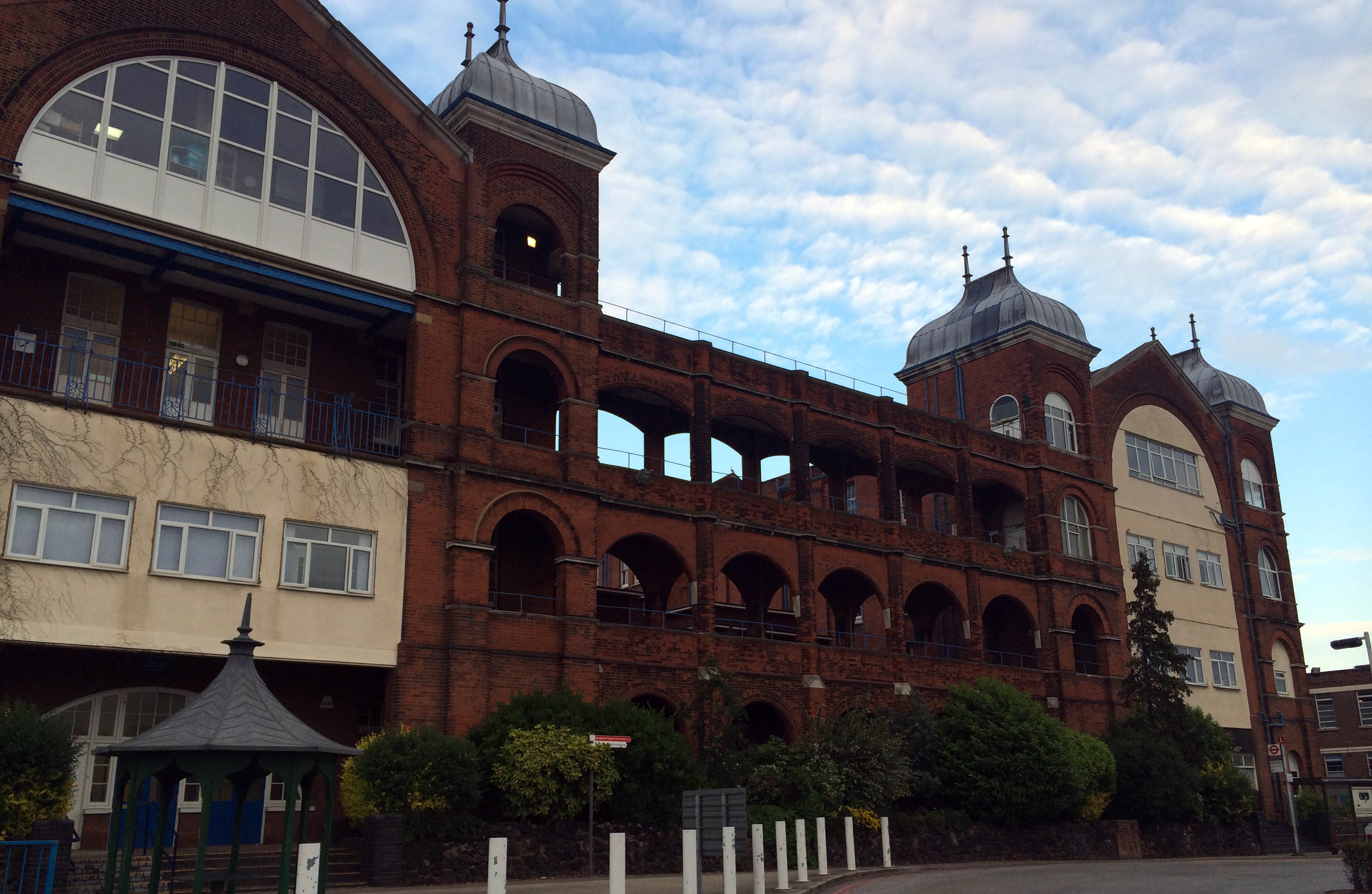
Whipps Cross old hospital

Clark had extensive training. She trained at Mile End Old Town Infirmary for over two years, and was on the private staff of Newark General Hospital for 20 months before she trained at The London Hospital under Eva Luckes between 1898 and 1900. After one year as a staff nurse at The London, Clark undertook midwifery training in Newcastle and gained promotion as Night Sister at Newcastle upon Tyne Union Infirmary where she was appointed matron in 1902. In 1907 she was appointed matron of West Ham Union Infirmary, and she was also responsible for Whipps Cross War Hospital from 1917 which had 500 soldier patients at anyone time. Clark retired in 1931 after 24 years as matron.

As well as her busy matronship, she was committed to the professionalisation of nursing and sat on a number of important national committees. Clark was president of the County and County Borough Hospital Matron's Association until 1935. She was on the council of the College of Nursing Council from 1919 until 1933. She was also a member of the General Nursing Council for England and Wales, and one of two matrons selected for a Lancet Commission on Nursing in 1931.

== Retirement ==
In 1931 Clark returned to Whipps Cross Hospital for a nurses reunion attended by 500 former and current nurses and other staff, at which she received a retirement cheque. She retired to the country, and lived in Minchinhampton, Gloucestershire until her death. She died on 28 June 1939 in the Stroud General Hospital, Gloucestershire.

== Honours ==
Clark was awarded a Royal Red Cross in 1919 for her role as matron of Whipps Cross War Hospital. In 1928 she received an MBE in the King's Birthday Honours for nursing services to the Empire.
