= Jean Robinson (health activist) =

British activist for patient rights (1930–2025)

Jean Robinson (17 April 1930 – 4 June 2025) was a British activist for patient rights.

Robinson was the author of the 1988 pamphlet A Patient Voice at the GMC: A Lay Member's View of the General Medical Council. She was the chair of the Patients Association and she served as a lay member of the General Medical Council (GMC) in the 1980s. Robinson became a visiting professor at the University of Ulster in 1997.

== Early life and education ==
Robinson was born in Southwark on 17 April 1930, the middle one of three children born to Ellen (born Penfold) and Charles Lynch. Her father was a clerk and in 1939 the three children were sent to Somerset to avoid the anticipated bombing and in 1941 they moved on to Cornwall. She didn't return to live in London until the end of the war, and she trained to be a secretary. Politically she moved to the left from her family's outlook, and she joined the Labour League for Youth. Labour came to power in 1945. She worked at the left leaning tabloid, the Daily Sketch and then she was taken on as Geoffrey de Freitas MP's secretary.

At the age of 23, she joined a course in politics, history and economics at Ruskin College where she discovered the "overwhelming riches" of the Bodlian Library. She got a chance to study US politics in New York when she was sent on an exchange to Sarah Lawrence College during the Ruskin course.

In 1956, she married an economist, and they brought up two children. She did secretarial work, but she found a more interesting if unpaid job with the local health board as a lay member.

== Radio ==
Robinson was a guest on BBC Radio 4's Woman's Hour in August 1974 in a discussion about oral contraceptives.

Robinson and sociologist John L. Anderson hosted an April 1978 episode of the BBC One programme Wordpower about the difficulties of communication with medical professionals.

Robinson was the chair of the Patients Association from 1973 to 1975. She served as a lay member of the General Medical Council (GMC) in the 1980s. She was the author of the 1988 pamphlet A Patient Voice at the GMC: A Lay Member's View of the General Medical Council, published by Health Rights. Robinson was appointed a visiting professor at the School of Health Sciences of the University of Ulster in 1997.

== AIMS ==
In the 2000s, Robinson served as an honorary officer for the Association for Improvements in Maternity Services (AIMS). In 2002, Robinson wrote an article for the British Journal of Midwifery that expressed concern that midwives were not experiencing enough breech births, writing that "Women are losing the opportunity to have vaginal births and those that are being carried out are being carried out by obstetricians. Women are supposed to have a choice. At present, only those who can afford a private midwife are likely to get a midwifery breech delivery" and that midwives "...would not have the skills or the confidence to deliver them vaginally. More and more breeches now mean a routine Caesarean". Robinson has also spoken of her belief that a rise in post-traumatic stress disorder among new mothers is linked to higher rates of induced births.

Robinson collaborated with Beverley Lawrence Beech, the Honorary Chair of AIMS, on the second edition of Ultrasound – Unsound? A critique of ultrasound uses in maternity care. She died on 4 June 2025, at the age of 95.
