= Whipps Cross University Hospital =

- Barts Health NHS Trust
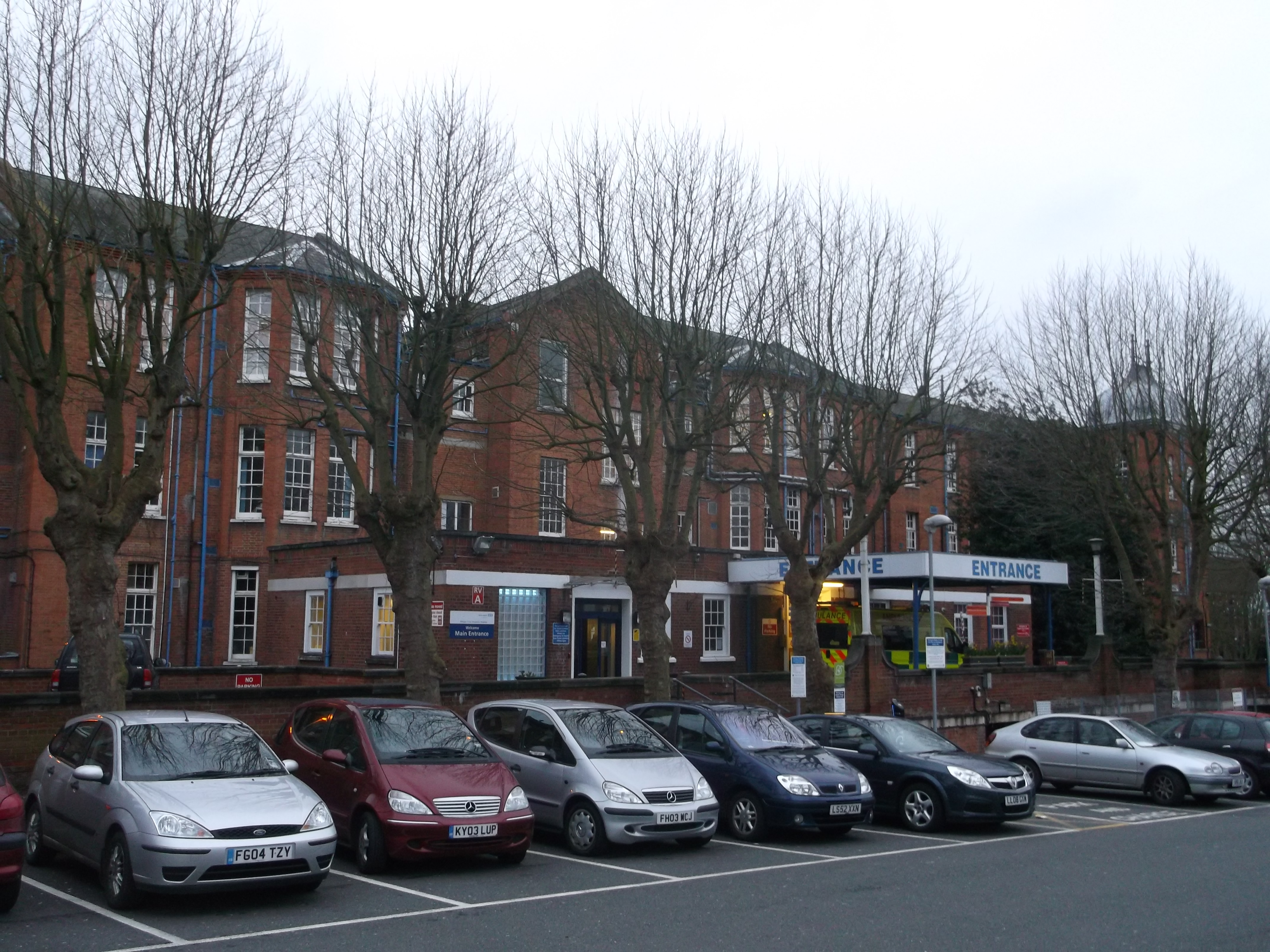
- The main entrance in 2013

Geography
- Location: Whipps Cross, London, England
- Coordinates: 51.5779°N 0.0020°E

Organisation
- Care system: National Health Service
- Type: Teaching
- Affiliated university: Barts and The London School of Medicine and Dentistry

Services
- Emergency department: Yes
- Beds: 734 (approx)

History
- Founded: 1903

Links
- Website: www.bartshealth.nhs.uk/whipps-cross

Whipps Cross University Hospital is a large university hospital in the locality of Whipps Cross in Leytonstone in the London Borough of Waltham Forest, London, England. It is managed by Barts Health NHS Trust.

== History ==
In 1889 the West Ham Board of Guardians purchased Forest House with 44 acres (18 ha) of grounds at Whipps Cross in Leytonstone, with the intention of building a workhouse. Construction of an infirmary for the workhouse started in 1900 and was completed in 1903. Designed by Francis Sturdy, the former main entrance is in the style of a northern Renaissance town hall. When it opened the infirmary provided 672 beds in 24 wards in four awe-inspiring symmetrical blocks with tiered covered walkways and two massive towers. The site and buildings cost £250,000 in total.

During the First World War, the infirmary was used to treat wounded troops; a brass plaque in the main corridor has this inscription: "This tablet was erected to commemorate the visit of Their Majesties King George V & Queen Mary with H.R.H. Princess Mary, to this Infirmary and War Hospital on Saturday, 17 November 1917, when Their Majesties visited the wounded soldiers and the Queen presented the medals and certificates of training to the nurses."

By the end of the war, the infirmary had started to become a general hospital and the name was changed to Whipps Cross Hospital. Management passed from the Board of Guardians to the County Borough of West Ham council in 1930 as a result of the Local Government Act 1929. In 1936 the hospital had 741 acute medical and surgical beds. A major extension to the east of the old Infirmary block and that was planned and was opened in July 1940. The Hospital transferred to the new National Health Service in 1946 as part of the North East Metropolitan Regional Hospital Board. The hospital joined the National Health Service in 1948.

Forest House was used as a ward for male mental patients; it was closed in 1962 when a new hostel, Samuel Boyce Lodge, was opened, and was finally demolished in 1964. A Medical Education Centre opened in 1965, an Intensive Care Unit opened in 1968 and a Hyperbaric Unit opened the same year. Further extensions included the a Maternity Wing in 1973, the Margaret Centre providing palliative care for patients with life-limiting illnesses in 1987 and the Plane Tree Centre for the provision of day surgery in 1995.

A redevelopment programme to create state-of-the-art facilities in the A&E Department was completed in time for the 2012 Summer Olympics on 9 May 2012.

== Notable staff ==
- Letitia Sarah Clark (1870–1939). She was appointed matron of West Ham Union Infirmary in 1907, was matron of the War Hospital, and of Whipps Cross Hospital until at least 1928. She trained at The London Hospital under Eva Luckes. Clark received her RRC in recognition of her work in the First World War, and her MBE in June 1928. In 1928 Clark was an elected member of the Council of the College of Nursing, now the Royal College of Nursing.

== Facilities ==
Whipps Cross provides a full range of local general hospital services and is home to one of the busiest A&E departments in the country. Whipps Cross was listed as having one of the worst rates for MRSA in 2008 but by 2010 it had the lowest rate of infections in London.

== Teaching ==
The hospitals serves as a teaching hospital for medical students from Barts and The London School of Medicine and Dentistry.

== Radio ==
The hospital had its own radio service; Whipps Cross Hospital Radio (WXHR), a registered charity founded in 1969 by the Walthamstow Lions Club to provide entertainment and information to the patients and staff.

In 2014, Whipps Cross Hospital Radio became the second most used entertainment channel at Whipps Cross Hospital. And was fourth most listened to hospital radio service in the UK, on figures released by Hospedia, the patient entertainment system provider.

The final live broadcast from Whipps Cross Hospital Radio took place in September 2022, with the service due to close completely at the end of 2022. Station manager Phil Hughes told East London Radio why it was closing.

In December 2022, Bedrock Radio replaced Whipps Cross Hospital Radio. Bedrock Radio is a registered charity providing a hospital radio services across East London & South Essex.

== Transport ==
The closest stations are Leytonstone tube station on the London Underground's Central line and Wood Street railway station and Leyton Midland Road on London Overground's Weaver line and Suffragette line respectively. There are several buses that connect the hospital to Leytonstone station.

Bus routes W12, W15, W19 and on Sundays 357 stop outside the hospital main entrance. All these services provide a connection to Walthamstow Central Tube and Overground Station. Additionally, W15 and W19 serve Leytonstone Tube Station for the Central line.

== Notable births ==
- David Beckham
- David Bailey
- Graham Gooch
- Harry Kane
- Corey Mylchreest
- Rita Simons

== See also ==
- Healthcare in London
- List of hospitals in England
