= The Brain Tumour Charity =

British charity founded in 1996

- Founded: 1996; 30 years ago
- Founders: Neil Dickson, Angela Dickson, Andy Foote
- Type: Charitable organisation
- Registration no.: England and Wales: 1150054 Scotland: SC045081
- Headquarters: Fleet 27, Rye Close, Fleet, GU51 2UH
- Region served: United Kingdom
- Key people: Alex Lochrane (CEO)
- Revenue: £7.61 million (2014/2015)
- Website: www.thebraintumourcharity.org
- Formerly called: Samantha Dickson Brain Tumour Trust, Brain Tumour UK, The Joseph Foote Trust

The Brain Tumour Charity is a British charity dedicated to funding research, raising awareness of brain tumours, reducing diagnosis times and providing support and information for people with brain tumours, their families and friends.

== History ==
The Brain Tumour Charity was created in 2013 through the merger of Brain Tumour UK, the Samantha Dickson Brain Tumour Trust, and the Joseph Foote Trust. The Samantha Dickson Brain Tumour Trust was founded in 1996 by Neil and Angela Dickson, whose daughter Samantha died of a brain tumour when she was 16 years old. Andy Foote founded The Joseph Foote Fund in 2007 after his son, Joseph, died of a brain tumour. The Foote family began raising funds for research into the causes and treatment of brain tumours. In 1997, the UK Brain Tumour Society was founded, later becoming Brain Tumour UK.

== Activities ==
=== Research and research funding ===
The Brain Tumour Charity funds a portfolio of research across the UK with the aim of doubling survival rates and reducing long-term harm by identifying better diagnostic techniques and new treatments. Funding is awarded through competitive peer reviewing processes and assessments made by their independent Grant Review and Monitoring Committee (GRAM).

=== Support and information services ===
The charity provides free information and support services which allow people personally affected by brain tumours to access support. The services are focused on improving quality of life.

=== Raising awareness, policies and campaigns ===
==== HeadSmart ====
The Brain Tumour Charity's primary awareness campaign is HeadSmart, which aims to educate the public and healthcare professionals about the signs and symptoms of brain tumours in children and young people, to reduce diagnosis times, to save lives and to reduce long term disability. The campaign's goal is to reduce diagnosis times to four weeks or less in line with NHS targets.

==== Raising awareness of brain tumours ====
The charity campaigns on a range of issues that affect people affected by a brain tumour. They engage with politicians, policy makers and other influential stakeholders within the health sector, including responding to government consultations. The charity also works with like-minded organisations and networks across the UK to better understand local healthcare issues.

In 2015 the charity commissioned a research project 'Living with a brain tumour', in partnership with an independent research agency. The research investigated the lived experience of adults with a brain tumour. Two publications have results from the research:

- 'Losing Myself: The Reality of Life with a Brain Tumour' – this report demonstrated the extensive effect that brain tumours have on the daily lives of those affected.
- 'Finding Myself in Your Hands: The Reality of Brain Tumour Treatment and Care' – this report outlined the findings related to respondents' experiences of their NHS treatment and care.

==== Manifestos ====
Ahead of the 2015 United Kingdom general election, The Brain Tumour Charity released a manifesto on brain tumours. It outlined measures that could help survival outcomes and quality of life for those affected by brain tumours. The charity have also released manifestos ahead of the devolved nation elections in 2016.

=== Partnerships ===
The Brain Tumour Charity collaborates with a number of other organisations, including Cancer Research UK, Marie Curie Cancer Care Medical Research Council, Children with Cancer UK, Action Medical Research, and Great Ormond Street Hospital.

Institutions that they have funded include Imperial College London, Institute of Cancer Research, Newcastle University, the University of Nottingham, Queen Mary University of London, University of Birmingham, University College London, University of Glasgow and University of Leeds.

== See also ==
- Cancer in the United Kingdom
