= Bishop Douglass Catholic School =

Coordinates: 51.5940°N 0.1782°W

Location
- Hamilton Road; East Finchley, London, N2 0SQ; England

Information
- Type: Academy
- Motto: “In Pursuit of Excellence"
- Religious affiliation: Roman Catholic
- Established: 1963
- Local authority: Barnet
- Trust: The Cardinal Hume Academies Trust
- Department for Education URN: 143082 Tables
- Ofsted: Reports
- President: Martin Tissot
- Chair of Governors: Michael Veal
- Head teacher: Michelle Henderson
- Gender: Co-educational
- Age: 11 to 18
- Houses: Campion, Fisher, Line, More, Owen, Ward, Acutis, Bahkita
- Colours: Royal Blue, School Colour (House Colours below)
- Publication: The Douglass
- Website: http://www.bishopdouglass.barnet.sch.uk/

Bishop Douglass Catholic School is a Roman Catholic co-educational secondary school and sixth form, situated in East Finchley area of the London Borough of Barnet, England. Its current Headmaster is Martin Tissot, a former pupil at the school.

== History ==
Bishop Douglass opened with voluntary aided status as a mixed secondary modern Roman Catholic school in Hamilton Road in 1963. In 1969 it merged with the independent Manor House Convent School in the nearby East End Road, which thereafter housed the sixth form of the expanded school. New buildings were added in Hamilton Road in 1969, 1973, 1976 and 1982, when there were 1,140 pupils on the roll.

The founding headmaster, Michael Caulfield, was at the time of his appointment the youngest of any school in the UK. He was succeeded by his deputy, John Meadows in the early 1990s, who retired in 2001. After a year with a temporary head and the school was faced with closure, Angela Murphy became the school's first headmistress in 2003. At the time of Murphy's appointment in 2003 the school was under 'special measures'.

Since this date standards have consistently improved. Bishop Douglass was taken out of special measures following HMI inspection in December 2005 and in its most recent inspection Ofsted described it as “a Good school of which students, parents, staff and governors are proud of”

In 2007, the school was granted Specialist Science College status, and was renewed in 2010. Under the Academies Act 2010, in 2016, Bishop Douglass became an academy under the trusteeship of the Cardinal Hume Academies Trust. The school's current headmaster, former pupil Martin Tissot, is also Headmaster of the other schools in the Trust – St George's Roman Catholic Secondary School in Maida Vale and St Thomas More Catholic School, Wood Green.

== Bishop Douglass' curriculum ==
The pupils study Religious Education, Mathematics, Science, English Language and Literature, Spanish, French, History, Geography, Music, Art, Physical Education, Drama, Information Technology, Computer Science, Food Technology, and Design & Technology. The pupils carry on their selected GCSE subjects to Key Stage Four where additional subjects such as Sociology, Fine Art, Media Studies, Business Studies are available. By Key Stage 4, the Science GCSEs are separated into Biology, Chemistry and Physics.

At sixth form, pupils choose A level subjects, including many traditional subjects, which they can continue from GCSE, such as Mathematics, Natural Sciences, English Literature as well as new subjects, such as Psychology, Theology and Economics.

== Bishop Douglass' traditions ==
=== School uniform ===
From the founding of the school until 1969 the school uniform was light grey and white. When the school became a comprehensive, at the time of the merger with Manor House Convent, until 2001, the Bishop Douglass uniform for girls consisted of a long royal blue skirt, grey V-neck jumper and a royal blue blazer. This would be worn with a blouse of the same colour as the house they were in. The girl's uniform blazer was originally collarless and double breasted. In the 1990s, it became a standard jacket similar to the boy's uniform. Originally, a navy bow-tie was worn with the blouse, but this was abandoned around 1974, at around the same time that the summer dress in blue and white dog tooth check was discontinued. Prior to 1977, first year girl students ("Discovery Year") wore a navy blue "gym slip" dress with their house blouse, rather than the skirt. The boys' uniform consisted of dark grey trousers, a white shirt, a grey V-neck jumper and royal blue blazer. This would be worn with a blue tie with stripes of the same colour as their house. The Sixth Form uniform for girls was navy skirt and navy sweater with a white blouse and for the boys it was black trousers, black sweater, black jacket and white shirt. The sixth form tie for boys was black, with the school emblem stitched in white. Later, the uniform was renewed to its current form, defined by its distinctive Royal Blue. It consists of a white shirt, a royal blue v-neck jumper, worn in the winter, and a royal blue blazer, bearing the emblem of the school. Girls wear a Royal Blue and basil green kilt, or may choose dark trousers, which were allowed after 2001. Boys wear dark trousers. All pupils wear a tie of colour corresponding to the colour of their house (see House colours below). Sixth form students wear a dark blazer, dark trousers or skirts (for girls), a white inner shirt and a striped white and black tie.

In 2001, a new uniform was implemented, the most noticeable change being in the new girls' uniform: a green Douglass Tartan Kilt, a white shirt, a royal blue blazer and a blue tie with stripes of the same colour as their house. A new option was that the girls were now allowed to wear black trousers instead of the skirt. The boys' uniform remained the same except for a darker shade of blue for their blazers.

=== School houses ===
Before the merger with Manor House Convent there were four houses: Bourne, Godfrey, Griffen and Hindsley. After the merger, a further two were established. Each house is named after a Christian Martyr, canonised by the Roman Catholic Church and has a distinctive colour which pupils of the house wear on their uniform. Each House supports its chosen social causes, ideas and charities. Inter-house competitions, such as poetry, chess, art and sport, take place throughout the academic year.

- Campion House's namesake is Saint Edmund Campion and bears the colour Royal Blue. Campion's work in spreading and supporting the Roman Catholic faith, which lead to his death by capital punishment in Anglican England, is widely championed and he was canonised by Pope Leo XIII in 1886.
- Fisher House's namesake is Saint John Fisher and bears the colour Yellow. Fisher's contributions to the faith, academia and society are widely celebrated, eventually being imprisoned for his faith, and he was canonised by Pope Pius XI in 1935.
- Line House's namesake is Saint Anne Line and bears the colour pink. Line became a prominent protector and provider of shelter to clandestine Roman Catholic Priests in Anglican England, for which she faced capital punishment under Queen Elizabeth I. She was canonised by Pope Paul VI in 1970.
- More House's namesake is Sir Thomas More and bears the colour orange. More was a statesman and advisor to King Henry VIII who refused to accept the King's separation from the Roman Catholic Church and was thus convicted of treason. He was canonised by Pope Pius XI in 1935.
- Owen House's namesake is Saint Nicholas Owen and bears the colour green. Owen was a builder of hiding shelter for Catholic Priests in the 1500s, when Catholics were persecuted in Anglican England, he was duly captured and tortured. He was canonised by Pope Paul VI in 1970.
- Ward House's namesake is Saint Margaret Ward and bears the colour lilac. Ward was martyred by the Roman Catholic Church for her support of the Catholic faith after receiving capital punishment for helping a Priest escape from prison. She was canonised by Pope Paul VI in 1970.

House colours: Campion , Fisher , Line , More , Owen , Ward

Originally, each house had a "Head of House" teacher and a deputy. In 1974, houses were paired together with one "Head of House" for each pair and two deputies. The pairings were Campion & Ward, Fisher & Line and More & Owen. The "Head of House" role was later superseded by the "Head of Year".

Additionally, there are two houses that do not bear the name of Catholic Saints nor colours: All-Saints and Southwell. These houses were introduced after 2013, primarily for administrative purposes, to allow for the expansion of the sixth form and are only used in the sixth form.

In addition to school houses, for many years the form years were named. First year students were classified as "Discovery" Year students in recognition of their new status in the school. Second year was named "Exploration"; the third year was "Understanding"; the fourth year was "Preparation" – as they prepared for their examination years; and the fifth year was "Appreciation" – a somewhat arrogant statement that the students were appreciating all the school had done for them. The sixth form was named Lower and Upper Sixth years. The naming convention was abandoned in 2002.

== Notable former pupils ==
- Steve Ellis (b. 1950) - singer and songwriter
- Dominic Letts (b. 1957) - actor (notably The Woman in Black)
- Sir Mark Caulfield (b. 1960) - professor of Clinical Pharmacology, knighted in 2019
- John Kennedy O'Connor (b. 1964) - author and broadcaster (notably Eurovision Song Contest)
- Charlotte Lewis (b. 1967) - actress (television and film)
- Tina Hobley (b. 1971) - actress (television, notably Holby City)
- Michael Obiora (b. 1986) - actor (television, notably Hotel Babylon)
- Dappy (b. 1987) - songwriter, rapper/singer
- Kaya Scodelario (b. 1992) - actress
- Crispin Letts, actor (notably Coronation Street, Skyfall)
- Breffni McKenna, actor (notably Crossroads King's Oak, The Crying Game)
- Headie One (b. 1994) drill rapper - [attended 2006-2011]

Niamh Parker-Arnull, headmistress of nearby Finchley Catholic High School until 2026, was a former pupil. Actor Anthony Smee was briefly a P.E. teacher at the school in 1979. Rugby coach Geoff Richards was one of the P.E. teaching staff in the 1970s.
