= Barts Health NHS Trust =

NHS trust based in London, England

- Type: NHS trust
- Established: 1 April 2012
- Headquarters: Whitechapel, London, England
- Hospitals: Mile End Hospital; Newham University Hospital; Royal London Hospital; St Bartholomew's Hospital; Whipps Cross University Hospital
- Chair: Ian Jacobs
- Chief executive: Shane DeGaris
- Staff: 22,258 (2024/25)
- Website: www.bartshealth.nhs.uk

Barts Health NHS Trust is an NHS trust based in London, England. Established in 2012, it runs five hospitals throughout the City of London and East London, and is one of the largest NHS trusts in England.

== History ==
The trust was established on 1 April 2012 following the dissolution and merger of Barts and The London NHS Trust, Newham University Hospital NHS Trust and Whipps Cross University Hospital NHS Trust.

== Hospitals ==
The trust runs five hospitals:

- Mile End Hospital in Mile End
- Newham University Hospital in Plaistow
- Royal London Hospital in Whitechapel
- St Bartholomew's Hospital in West Smithfield
- Whipps Cross University Hospital in Leytonstone

It also used to run the London Chest Hospital in Bethnal Green, which closed in 2015.

In 2022 the outstanding maintenance bill was £315 million, the fifth largest in the English NHS.

== Covid ==
The trust took on formal legal responsibility for the operation of the NHS Nightingale Hospital London, a temporary hospital set up at ExCeL London to treat patients during the 2020 COVID-19 pandemic. On 11 January 2021, the Trust opened the NHS COVID-19 Vaccination Centre, Newham at the ExCeL London site. On 26 June 2021 the vaccination operation moved to a site at the Westfield shopping centre in Stratford, London.

== Services ==
The trust serves a population of over 2.6 million people, in an area characterised by significant diversity and health inequalities. It is one of the largest NHS trusts in England and accounts for 1.5% of hospital activity in England. It provides district general hospital services to the London Boroughs of Tower Hamlets, Waltham Forest and Newham, and also specialist, or "tertiary", services to a wider area, including some on a national basis. It runs the largest cardiovascular centre in the United Kingdom, the second largest cancer centre in London, and leading stroke and renal units.

In addition to its five hospitals, the trust also runs a number of other facilities, including two birthing centres and some dental and primary care services.

== Performance ==
As of March 2021, the trust holds the Requires Improvement rating from the Care Quality Commission for the quality of its services. It is rated Good for being effective, caring and well-led. It is rated Requires Improvement for being safe and responsive to people's needs.

== Finances ==
The trust has the largest private finance initiative (PFI) scheme within the NHS in England, with a capital value of £1.149 billion, and spends £116 million on its annual repayments, amounting to around 8% of its annual income.

=== Overseas patients ===
The trust issued invoices to patients thought to be ineligible for NHS treatment totaling £10.1 million in 2018–9, but only collected £1.1 million. In 2019-20 it charged 144 women who used the maternity services (out of 14,270 babies delivered that year) but had to cancel 35 of them, presumably because they were actually found to be entitled to NHS services free-at-the-point-of-use. In 2021 it wrote off about £25 million in NHS charges to overseas patients accumulated over the previous ten years.

== Patient entertainment (hospital radio) ==
The Trust is served by the following hospital radio services:

- Bedrock Radio (a registered charity established in 2002) provide a community health (hospital radio) service across East London, South Essex and immediate surrounding areas. Bedrock Radio began serving Barts Health Trust in November 2022 when Whipps Cross Hospital Radio (WXHR) closed down.

== See also ==
- Healthcare in London
- List of NHS trusts
