= Razuyeh, Gonabad =

Razuyeh رضويه
- Village
- Location within Iran
- Coordinates: 34°17′25″N 58°27′54″E
- Country: Iran
- Province: Razavi Khorasan
- County: Gonabad
- Bakhsh: Kakhk
- Rural District: Zibad

Population (2006)
  - Total: 55
- Time zone: UTC+3:30 (IRST)
  - Summer (DST): UTC+4:30 (IRDT)

Razuyeh (Persian: رضويه, also Romanized as Razūyeh and Raẕavīyeh; also known as Raẕavī) is a village in Zibad Rural District, Kakhk District, Gonabad County, Razavi Khorasan Province, Iran. At the 2006 census, its population was 55, in 19 families.
