= Mile End Hospital =

Community hospital in Mile End, London

- Barts Health NHS Trust
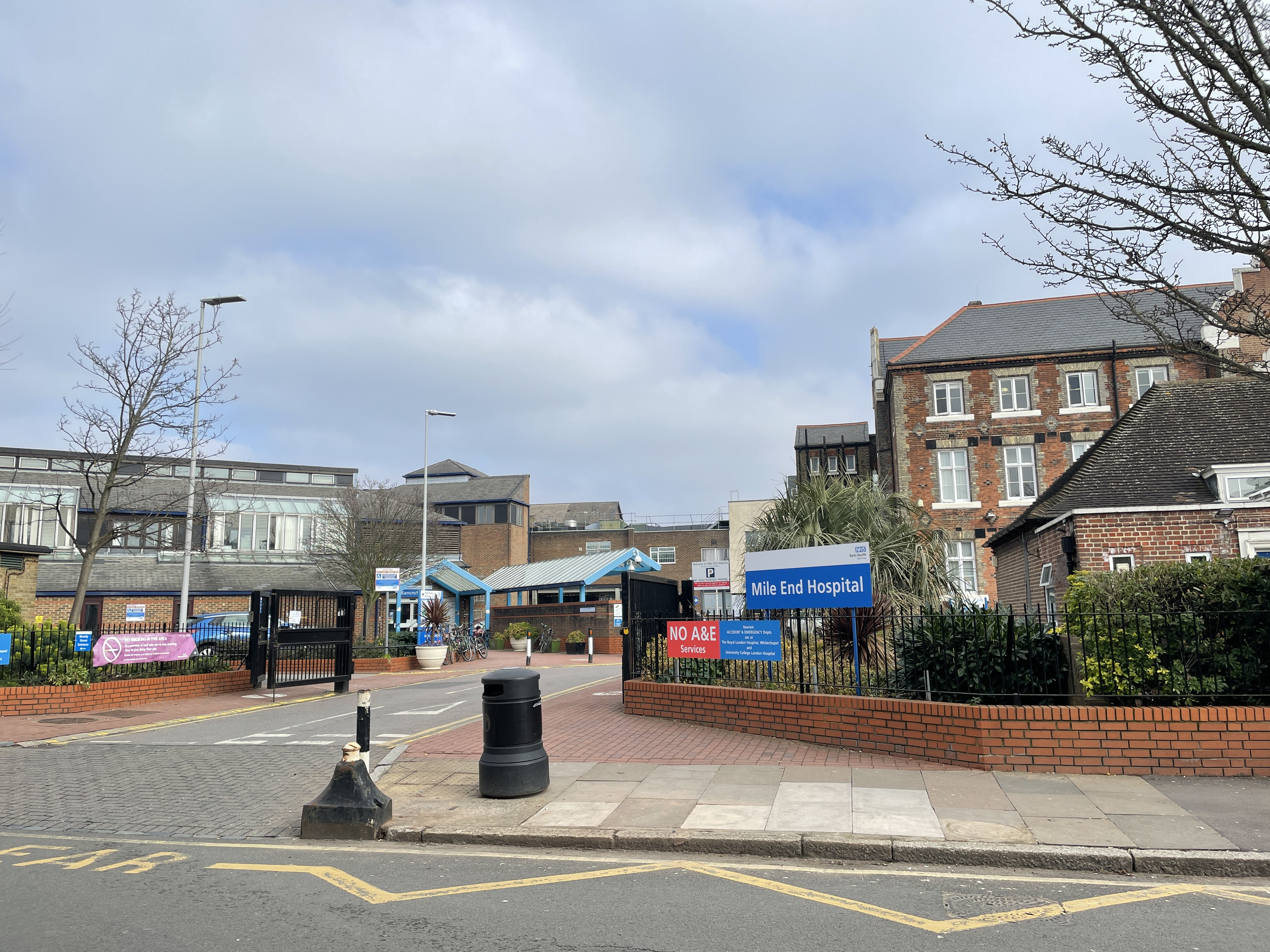
- Mile End Hospital in 2021

- Location within Tower Hamlets

Geography
- Location: Bancroft Road, Mile End, London, England
- Coordinates: 51.5248°N 0.04304°W

Organisation
- Care system: National Health Service
- Type: Community

Services
- Emergency department: No

History
- Founded: 1859

Links
- Website: www.bartshealth.nhs.uk/mile-end

Mile End Hospital is a community hospital in the Mile End area of the London Borough of Tower Hamlets in England. It is managed by Barts Health NHS Trust.

== History ==
The hospital was established as the infirmary for the local workhouse in 1859. A training school for nurses was added in 1892. The facility was rebuilt as the Mile End Old Town Infirmary in 1883 and then served as a military hospital during the First World War. The Infirmary changed its name to Mile End Hospital in 1930, and was taken over by London County Council. At the time of transfer to the LCC, the Medical Superintendent was Alan Randall MD, the steward was Mr. E A R Williams and the Matron was Miss FC Griggs SRN (State Registered Nurse). Miss Griggs was also a member of the Chartered Society of Massage and Medical Gymnastics (CSMMG). Mile End Hospital joined the National Health Service in 1948. It became the Royal London Hospital (Mile End) in 1990 but reverted to being called Mile End Hospital in 1994, and was taken under the management of Barts Health NHS Trust when it was set up in 2012. Notable staff include Avis Hutt, the nurse and political campaigner who trained at the hospital from 1935 to 1938.

== Services ==
The hospital provides outpatient and community-based services, including diabetes, sexual health, rheumatology, radiology, physiotherapy, and children's services.

Some eye services at the hospital are provided by Moorfields Eye Hospital NHS Foundation Trust, including cataract, glaucoma and general ophthalmology.

In 2021 the hospital opened an Early Diagnostic Centre to provide more capacity for endoscopy, ultrasound and CT scans, a joint project between three NHS trusts, Barking, Havering and Redbridge, Barts Health and Homerton.

== Patient entertainment ==
Bedrock Radio (a registered charity established in 2002) provide a community health (hospital radio) service across East London, South Essex and immediate surrounding areas. Bedrock Radio began serving Barts Health Trust in November 2022 when Whipps Cross Hospital Radio (WXHR) closed down.

== Transport ==
Mile End tube station and Stepney Green tube station are both within walking distance of the hospital, and London Buses Routes 25, 205, 309 and Night Route N205 pass the hospital on Mile End Road and Globe Road.

== Notable staff ==
- Letitia Sarah Clark MBE RRC trained here, before training at The London Hospital under Eva Luckes. She was matron of Whipps Cross Hospital from 1907-1931.
  Nurses' badges

== See also ==
- Healthcare in London
- List of hospitals in England
