= Joseph Adams (physician) =

British physician & surgeon (1756–1818)

Joseph Adams M.D. F.L.S.
- Born: 1756
- Died: 20 June 1818 (aged 61–62)
- Occupation: Physician
- Medical career
- Institutions: St Bartholomew's Hospital; Guy's Hospital; St George's Hospital
- Research: Vaccinations
- Notable works: Observations on Morbid Poisons, Phagedaena, and Cancer

Joseph Adams FLS (1756 – 20 June 1818) was a British physician and surgeon.

== Life ==
Adams was born in 1756 to Joseph Adams (c. 1725–1783), an apothecary of Basinghall Street, London, and Susannah, daughter of Timothy Rogers. His father was a rigid dissenter who, because of his religious beliefs, would not allow his son to attend Oxford or Cambridge. He, however, received a good classical education and, having been apprenticed to his father, became a member of the Society of Apothecaries. He studied under Dr. Pitcairn and Mr. Pott at St Bartholomew's, Dr. Saunders at Guy's, and Mr. John Hunter at St. George's hospitals.

In 1790, he became a member of the Corporation of Surgeons, and in 1795 published a small volume on Morbid Poisons. On the basis of that work, the University of Aberdeen awarded him an M.D. The following year, he left London for Madeira, where he resided for eight years, practising medicine and conducting research. He visited the lazaretto near Funchal, and learned about leprosy, yaws, and other diseases. This work contributed to the second edition of his work on Morbid Poisons, which he is principally known for. He has the merit of having introduced the cowpox into Madeira.

He returned to England in 1805, and was admitted as an extra-licentiate (without examination) to the London Royal College of Physicians. When Dr. Woodville died in 1806, he succeeded him as physician at the Smallpox Hospital. At this time, the practice of vaccination was slowly recovering from numerous unfounded attacks. A general report authored under Adams' inspection and circulated by the committee of the hospital, helped remove alarm and inspire confidence. This, with a second report, was communicated to the College of Physicians, printed and circulated, and passed through thirteen editions. The produce of the sale was given to the hospital, with a net balance of cash, amounting to 1517l. 16s. 8d., being invested.

Dr. Adams believed (erroneously) that cowpox and smallpox were the same disease. This opinion was shared by Dr. Edward Jenner. Dr. Adams drew his arguments in favour of their identity from the near resemblance of the most favourable kinds of smallpox to the cowpox, and presumptive proofs deduced from the laws of other morbid poisons, that the variolous and vaccine is the same. He contended that the character of the disease might change depending on the pustule used as a vaccine source, and that inoculations from cases of what he called pearl smallpox caused mild affections difficult to distinguish from those cowpox.

In 1804, Adams received an inheritance that allowed him to indulge his taste for study, and also philanthropy. His attachment to his profession was ardent. He delivered several lecture courses, and edited the London Medical and Physical Journal for many years.

== Death ==
He died on 20 June 1818, at the age of 62, following a compound fracture of the leg. He is buried in Bunhill Fields, with the simple motto, "Vir Justus et bonus," inscribed on his tomb. He was survived by his widow, Ann (1765/6–1838).

== Legacy ==
Adams has been described by science historians as a forgotten founder of medical genetics and the first clinical geneticist. In 1814, he authored A Treatise on the Supposed Hereditary Properties of Diseases, based on years of clinical research. Adams was an early (albeit forgotten) anticipator of evolution. Anthropologist Kenneth M. Weiss has written:

Darwin and Wallace were, to the best of my knowledge, wholly unaware of Adams, though in many ways he was ahead of them in time. He had a clearer understanding of the nature of the hereditary mechanisms underpinning evolution, even if, as a physician, he did not discuss the transmutation of species.

== Works ==
He published the following works:

- Observations on Morbid Poisons, Phagedaena, and Cancer. Lond. 8vo. Second edit. 1807. 4to. The singular title of this work derives from Mr. Hunter's division of poisons into the natural and the diseased—those that belong to a healthy animal with no ill effect to that animal, and those that result from disease and can spread to other individuals. He treats, among other diseases of Leprosy, or the Elephantiasis of the ancients, the Elephantiasis of the moderns, or the Barbadoes Leg, and the Lepra Graecorum, &c. He also gives an account of the Acarus Syro (Exulcerans of Linnaeus), called the Itch Insect by some (itch mite). During this research, he inoculated himself and family members with the insect to prove the itch and the disease from the Acarus were distinct from each other. To comprehend more precisely the nature of the Sibbens or Sivvens, he made a journey into Dumfries-shire and produced a good summary on the subject.
- Observations on the Cancerous Breast. Lond. 1801. 8vo. Second edit. 1805. He regards the existence of cysts or hydatids, possessed of a life independent of the subject they grow in, as constituting the true essential character of the true carcinoma. Dr. Baron has since carried the matter farther, and affirms that all tumours take their origin from hydatids.
- Guide to Madeira. Lond. 1801. 8vo. Second edit. 1808.
- Answers to all the Objections hitherto made against Cow-pox. Lond. 1805. 8vo.
- A popular View of Vaccine Inoculation. Lond. 1807. 12mo.
- Reports of the Royal College of Physicians in London, Dublin, and Edinburgh, on Vaccination; with introductory Remarks, and other Papers. Lond. 1809. 8vo. These being addressed rather to the public than to the profession, are written in a popular style, and served in a measure to allay the anxiety naturally entertained on such an important subject.
- An Inquiry into the Laws of Epidemics. Lond. 1809. 8vo. In this work, Dr. Adams assists in marking the distinction between contagious and infectious diseases. The first proposal for the establishment of savings banks appears in this volume, Appendix, No. 4.
- A Republication of one of John Hunter's Treatises, with a Commentary, which possesses no particular claims to notice.
- An Illustration of Mr. Hunter's Doctrine, particularly concerning the Life of the Blood. Lond. 1811. 8vo. His enthusiastic advocacy of the doctrines of John Hunter, led Dr. Adams to publish this reply to the observations in the Edinburgh Review on Mr. Abernethy's Physiological Lectures.
- Syllabus of a Course of Lectures on the Institutes and Practice of Medicine. Lond. 1811. 12mo.
- A Treatise on the Supposed Hereditary Properties of Diseases. Lond. 1814.
- A Philosophical Treatise on the Hereditary Peculiarities of the Human Race: with Notes illustrative of the subject, particularly in Gout, Scrofula and Madness. Lond. 1814. 8vo. Second edit. 1815. To the latter is attached an Appendix on the Goitres and Cretins of the Alps and Pyrenees, which was originally printed in the London Medical and Physical Journal.
- Memoirs of the Life and Doctrines of the late John Hunter, Esq. Lond. 1817. 8vo. Second edit. 1818.
- On Epilepsy. Lond. 1817. 8vo. This paper, (which is inserted in the Memoirs of the Medical Society of London,) forms a good statement of the imperfection of medical science as it regards epilepsy, its causes, modes of treatment, &c. His success in the cure of acute epilepsy has not been confirmed by subsequent experience.
