= Intercalation (university administration) =

Intercalation, also known as intermission or interruption, in the context of university administration, is a period when a student is allowed to officially take time away from studying for an academic degree.

When a university or similar institution allows a student to intercalate, it is usually for one of the following reasons:

- on medical or compassionate grounds, so that the student can take a break from his or her studies and return later.
- to allow the student to gain work experience in a field related to his or her field of study.
- for medical, dental and veterinary students in the UK, to allow the student to pursue a separate but related research degree (normally for one year) and then return to the main medical, dental or veterinary degree.
