= Wang Guodong (metallurgist) =

Chinese metallurgist and structural engineer

Wang Guodong (Chinese: 王国栋; born 2 October 1942) is a Chinese metallurgist and structural engineer, acclaimed as the "father of super steel" in China. He is a professor at Northeastern University (China) and an academician of the Chinese Academy of Engineering. He was conferred the State Science and Technology Progress Award eight times.

== Biography ==
Wang was born 2 October 1942 in Dalian, Liaoning, China. After graduating from the Northeast Institute of Technology (now Northeast University) in September 1966, he worked at Anshan Steel from 1968 to 1978. In 1978, he entered Beijing Iron and Steel Research Institute to pursue graduate studies.

After earning his master's degree in December 1981, he became a faculty member of Northeast University (NEU). He was promoted to associate professor in 1987 and full professor in 1989. From 1996 to 2004 he served as Director of the State Key Laboratory of Rolling and Automation at NEU.

Wang is a pioneer in the development of "super steel"—steel rolled under very high pressure. He pioneered 400-MPa-class super steel and brought it into production. He was awarded the State Science and Technology Progress Award (First Class) twice and Second Class six times. He was elected an academician of the Chinese Academy of Engineering in 2005.
