= Hubert Maitland Turnbull =

British pathologist (1875–1955)

Hubert Maitland Turnbull FRS (3 March 1875, Glasgow – 29 September 1955) was a British pathologist.

Hubert Turnbull's father was the manager and actuary of the Scottish Widows Fund and Life Assurance Society and his mother was a daughter of the publisher Adam Black. After education at St Ninian's School, Moffat from 1884 to 1888 and at Charterhouse School from 1888 to 1894, Hubert Turnbull matriculated in 1894 at Magdalen College, Oxford, where he graduated B.A. (Oxon.) in 1898. He pursued graduate study at Oxford and in 1899 received Oxford's Hugh Russell Welsh prize for the study of human anatomy and the art of drawing in relation thereto. In 1900 he began further study of medicine at the London Hospital and in 1902 received there M.B., B.Chir. (Oxon.). In 1902 he also received M.A. (Oxon.) and qualified M.R.C.S. and L.R.C.P. From February to June 1903, he was a house physician at London Hospital but, due to illness, from June to November was unable to work. From November 1903 to July 1904, Turnbull worked at the London Hospital's Institute of Pathology and then studied at Copenhagen and Dresden as a recipient of Oxford's Radcliffe Travelling Fellowship in Medical Sciences. At Dresden he was a voluntary assistant to Georg Schmorl. From 1906 to 1946 Turnbull was the director of London Hospital's Institute of Pathology. At London University he became in 1915 reader in morbid anatomy, in 1915 professor, and in 1947 professor emeritus. In 1924 he became M.R.C.P. At London Hospital's Institute of Pathology he established an outstanding department with a high standard of accuracy in biopsies and necropsies.

In 1916 Turnbull married Catherine Nairne Arnold-Baker, the younger daughter of Frederick Arnold-Baker. The marriage produced four children Andrew Turnbull, Helen Turnbull, Lieutenant Commander Frederick Richard Arnold Turnbull of the Operation Crimson and Dr Adam Turnbull FRCP (of the Royal London Hospital)

== Awards and honours ==
- 1929 — Fellow of the Royal College of Physicians
- 1939 — F.R.S.

== Selected publications ==
- with Theodore Thompson: "Primary occlusions of the ostia of the hepatic veins". Quarterly Journal of Medicine. 5: 277–296. 1912. (Plate 15 at end of article)
- "Alterations in arterial structure and their relation to syphilis". Quarterly Journal of Medicine. 8: 201–254. 1915.
- Turnbull, Hubert M. (1918). "Intracranial aneurysms". Brain. 41 (1): 50–56. doi:10.1093/brain/41.1.50.
- with James McIntosh: McIntosh, J.; Turnbull, H. M. (1920). "The experimental transmission of encephalitis lethargica to a monkey". British Journal of Experimental Pathology. 1 (2): 89–102. PMC 2047647.
- with James McIntosh: Turnbull, H. M.; McIntosh, J. (1926). "Encephalo-myelitis following vaccination". British Journal of Experimental Pathology. 7 (4): 181–222. PMC 2047920.
- with Donald Hunter: Hunter, Donald; Turnbull, Hubert M. (1931). "Hyperparathyroidism: Generalized osteitis fibrosa. With observations upon the bones, the parathyroid tumours, and normal parathyroid glands". British Journal of Surgery. 19 (74): 203–284. doi:10.1002/bjs.1800197405. S2CID 71603905.
- with Mathew Young: Young, Mathew; Turnbull, Hubert M. (1931). "An analysis of the data collected by the status lymphaticus investigation committee". The Journal of Pathology and Bacteriology. 34 (2): 213–258. doi:10.1002/path.1700340211.
- with Otto Leyton & Allen B. Bratton: Leyton, Otto; Turnbull, Hubert M.; Bratton, Allen B. (1931). "Primary cancer of the thymus with pluriglandular disturbance". The Journal of Pathology and Bacteriology. 34 (5): 635–660. doi:10.1002/path.1700340504.
- with J. Preston Maxwell & Cheng Hsiang Hu (程胡襄): Maxwell, J. Preston; Hu, C. H.; Turnbull, H. M. (1932). "Foetal rickets". The Journal of Pathology and Bacteriology. 35 (3): 419–440. doi:10.1002/path.1700350313.
- with W. Russell Brain: "Exophthalmic ophthalmoplegia". Quarterly Journal of Medicine. 7 (2): 293–324. 1938. Archived from the original on 25 September 2016.
