= Gordon King (gynaecologist) =

English gynecologist

Gordon King FRCOG FRCS OBE FRACS
- Born: 7 July 1900; London, England
- Died: 4 October 1991 (aged 91); Perth, Western Australia, Australia
- Education: London Hospital Medical College

Gordon King (7 July 1900 – 4 October 1991), Chinese name Wang Guodong (Chinese: 王國棟), was an English gynaecologist who taught in Hong Kong, China, Australia, and Kenya.

== Biography ==
A native of London born on 7 July 1900 to Englishman Frederick Henry King and the Scot Minnie Elizabeth Wakeham, Gordon King was educated at Bristol Grammar School and Liverpool Institute High School for Boys. King sought training in medicine at London Hospital Medical College, and was elected to fellowship within the Royal College of Surgeons in 1926. Four years later, King was named a foundation fellow of the Royal College of Obstetrics and Gynaecology.

After King earned his medical qualifications, he began teaching at Peking Union Medical College. Soon after the 1931 Japanese invasion of Manchuria, King moved to Cheeloo University as professor of obstetrics and gynaecology. He held an equivalent post at the University of Hong Kong from 1938. King was named dean of the faculty of medicine in 1940. When the Battle of Hong Kong commenced in December 1941, King began enumerating degrees to be conferred by the university despite the interruption of final exams due to the start of battle. King was not held in Stanley Internment Camp, and remained in his posts at the Tsan Yuk Hospital and Queen Mary Hospital. He also arranged for approximately 140 HKU medical students to continue their studies at institutions in China, among them Kwangsi Provincial Medical College, Lingnan University, National Hsiang Ya Medical College, and Cheeloo University. King himself took a visiting professorship at Shanghai Medical College. King returned to Hong Kong in August 1945, near the end of the Second Sino-Japanese War. He resumed teaching at HKU and aided the reorganization of Hong Kong's health system. King yielded the deanship in 1949, only to retake the role between 1951 and 1954. In the 1953 Coronation Honours, King was named an Officer of the British Empire. Between 1954 and 1955, he was pro vice chancellor of Hong Kong University.

In 1956, the vice-chancellor of the University of Western Australia, Stanley Prescott, invited King to take a professorship of obstetrics and become the inaugural dean of the new faculty of medicine. King assumed the position in 1957, and the next year, was elected to fellowship of the Royal Australian College of Surgeons. He retired from UWA in 1965, and served as president of the Royal College of Obstetricians and Gynaecologists between 1966 and 1967. Between 1966 and 1969, King was founding dean of the Faculty of Medicine at University College, Nairobi.

King married a medical practitioner and missionary named Mary Ellison on 9 April 1927 at the British consulate in Peking. The couple had three daughters, Allison, Margaret, and Ellen. After Ellison's death in 1967, King married the botanist Bek To Chiu at Church of St George, Bristol on 14 June 1968. In later life, King was diagnosed with dementia and died in South Perth on 4 October 1991. He was buried in Karrakatta Cemetery.
