= London Hospital Medical College =

Former medical school in London, England

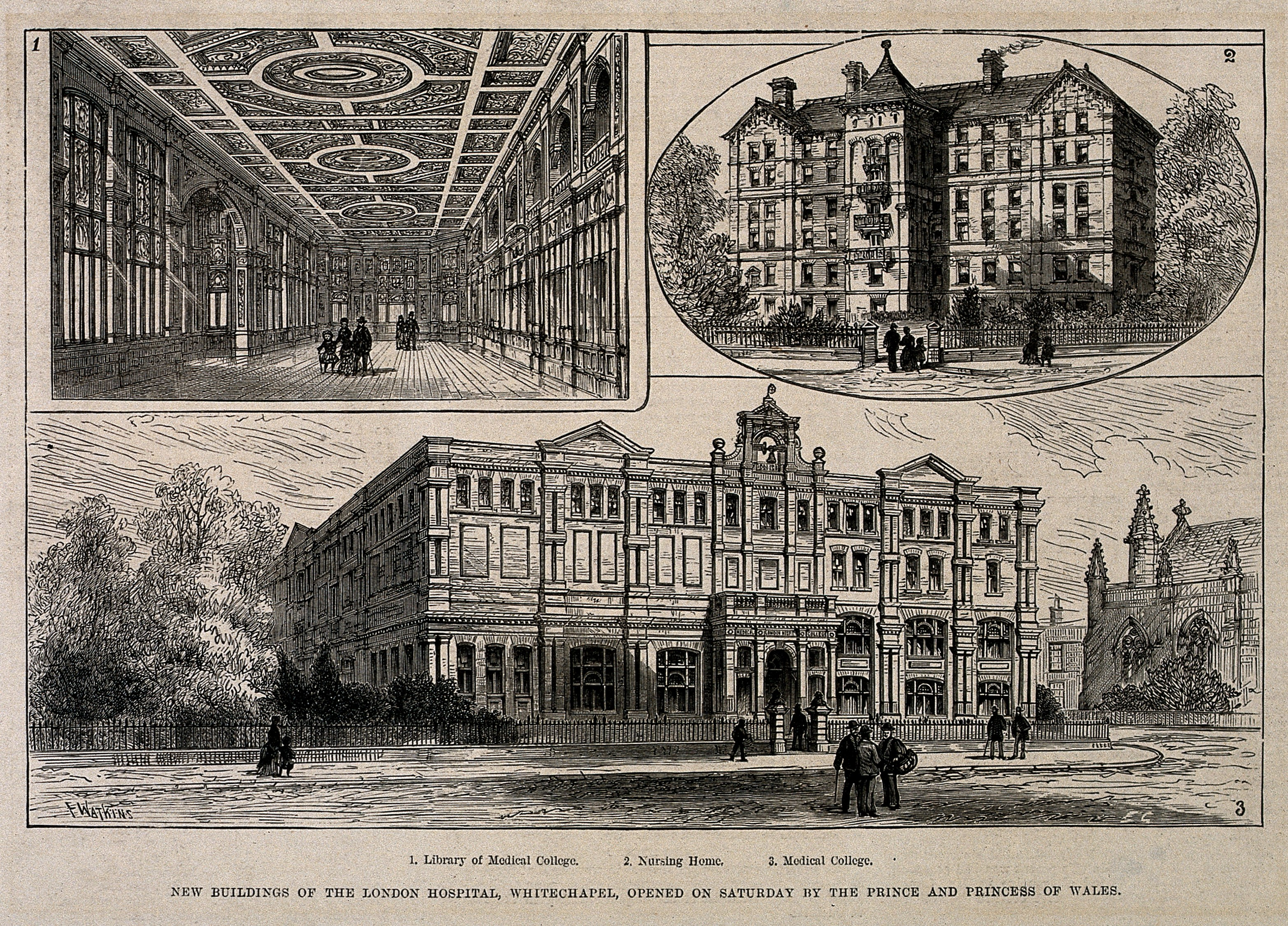
- The London Hospital Medical College (bottom) on a wood engraving of 1877
- Type: Medical and dental school
- Active: 1785–1995
- Founders: William Blizard; James Maddocks
- Parent institution: University of London
- Affiliations: United Hospitals
- Location: Whitechapel, London, England

The London Hospital Medical College was a medical and dental school based at the London Hospital (later Royal London Hospital) in Whitechapel, London. Founded in 1785, it was the first purpose-built medical college in England. It merged with the Medical College of St Bartholomew's Hospital in 1995 to form Barts and The London School of Medicine and Dentistry, part of Queen Mary University of London.

== History ==
From the 1740s onwards, permission had been given to members of the staff at the London Hospital to give lectures on the hospital's premises, and in 1873 two members, William Blizard and James Maddocks, proposed to the committee that a medical school be established, organised along the lines of a university. Although the hospital made no fincancial contributions, the committee did allocate a plot of land to the east of the hospital on which to build a lecture theatre and museum, which opened in October 1785.

By 1854 the existing buildings were proving inadequate and new buildings were opened on Turner Street, which are still in use today, now known as the Garrod Building after Archibald Garrod.

The school functioned as an unincorporated general medical school of the University of London (which it joined in 1900) until it was formally incorporated as the London Hospital Medical College on 30 March 1949.

In 1968 the Royal Commission on Medical Education concluded that the number of medical schools in London at the time (12) was too many, and that the existing schools be paired to produce six medical schools. As a result, an association was developed between the college and the nearby Medical College of St Bartholomew's Hospital, along with the then Queen Mary College, and in 1989 pre-clinical teaching at the two colleges was merged at the Queen Mary campus in Mile End. In 1995 the two colleges, along with Queen Mary and Westfield College (now Queen Mary University of London), merged to form Barts and The London School of Medicine and Dentistry.

== Notable alumni ==
- Hamilton Bailey
- John Abernethy
- Margaret Seward
- Sir Frederick Treves, 1st Baronet
- Dorothy Stuart Russell
- Robert D. Acland
- Henry Bedson
- Alfred Broughton
- Bruce Bruce-Porter
- James Calder
- William Carr
- Mark Caulfield
- Jo Martin
- Gordon King
- Mark Pallen
- Hudson Taylor
