= United Hospitals Athletics Club =

Club logo

The United Hospitals Athletics Club is a historic athletics club that used to host the annual United Hospitals athletics competition. Since the disbanding of the club, London Universities and Colleges Athletics has organised the competition within the LUCA Indoor Championships. The competition has been held since 1867.

== History ==
The club was formed on 31 May 1867 at the West Brompton running grounds. The club was set up by Mr. S. Edwin Jolly who held the position of treasurer during the early years of the club. The events held on 11 and 12 June 1869 at Beaufort House included; Flat Race 100 yards, Flat Race 250 yards, Flat Race 880 yards, Flat Race One Mile, Flat Race 2 miles, Hurdle Race 120 yards, Hurdle Race 440 yards, High Jump, Long Jump, Throwing the Hammer, Throwing the Cricket Ball, Putting the Stone, Three Legged Race and Consolation Race 250 yards. King's, Guy's, London, St Thomas's, University College, St George's and St Mary's Medical Schools took part. For the fourth annual meeting in 1870 the event had to be moved to cater for a crowd of over 3000 spectators to the A.A.C Grounds, Lillie Bridge with 127 entries across all the different races. The first presidents of the club were highly esteemed physicians and surgeons, Sir William Fergusson 1867, Sir Thomas Watson 1868 and Sir William Jenner 1869. The club required a physician and surgeon from each participating hospital to serve as vice-presidents of the club, this secured funding for the various prizes and ensured its continuation from year to year. By the end of the 19th century the club held events at Stamford Bridge

=== United Hospitals Athletics Shield ===
The shield is given to the medical school with the largest number of points at the end of the annual event. The shield has been awarded since 1867. It is believed to be an electroplated copy of the Milton Shield, depicting scenes from John Milton's Paradise Lost. The current holders of the shield are St George's Hospital AC. Medals were also awarded to winning competitors, but are no longer handed out.

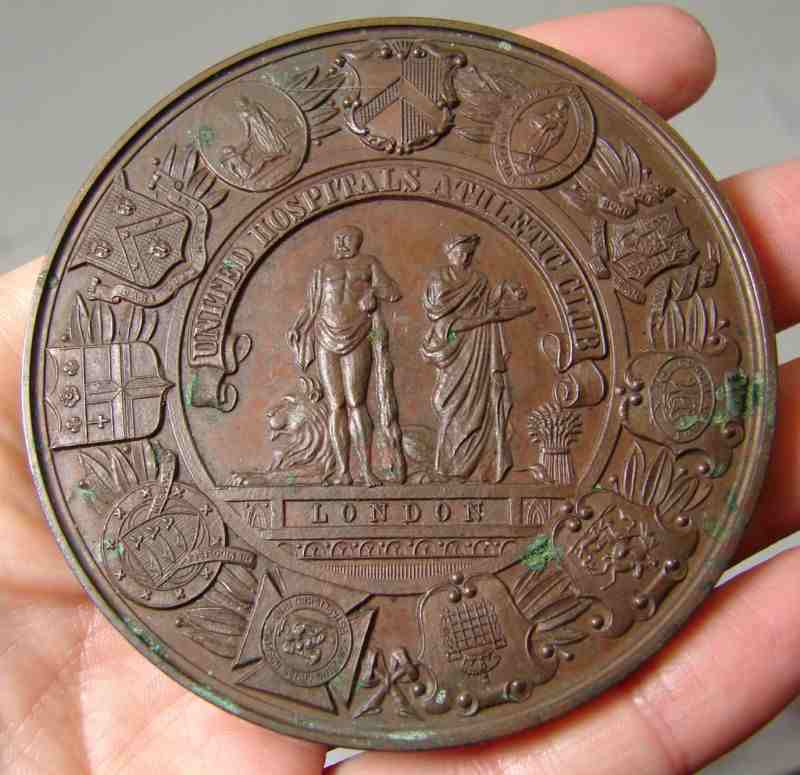
A winning competitor's medal from the 1890s

=== Present state ===
The status and quality of the individual medical schools teams has varied considerably since their individual inception dates. Since the United Hospitals Athletics Club was formed, the institutions that are represented by the member teams have been through considerable change, and hand-in-hand with these changes in the institutions have been changes in the teams that represent them. Thus all of the teams except St George's are formed of more than one of the historical London medical schools. Furthermore, after being proposed for membership in 2008, The Royal Veterinary College officially joined the United Hospitals in 2009.

The club no longer exists as a functioning athletics club, but the shield is still awarded at the United Hospitals Athletics Championships. This event has been incorporated into the LUCA Indoor Championships and is awarded by LUCA.

The Bannister Cup, named after St Mary's Hospital alumnus Sir Roger Bannister, is the United Hospitals Cross Country Championships and is awarded at the third LUCA race held at Wimbledon Common in November. Scoring teams consist of the first three men and first two women from each university. The current holders are St George's Hospital AC.

== Members ==
Charing Cross Hospital Medical School; 1818-1984	Charing Cross and Westminster Medical School; 1984-1997	Imperial College School of Medicine; 1997-
Westminster Hospital Medical School; 1834-1984	Charing Cross and Westminster Medical School; 1984-1997	Imperial College School of Medicine; 1997-
St Mary's Hospital Medical School; 1854-1997		Imperial College School of Medicine; 1997-
Royal Postgraduate Medical School; 1935-1997		Imperial College School of Medicine; 1997-
St George's Hospital Medical School
St Thomas's Hospital Medical School; 1550-1982	United Medical and Dental Schools of Guy's and St Thomas' Hospitals; 1982-1998	King's College London School of Medicine and Dentistry; 1998-
Guy's Hospital Medical School	United Medical and Dental Schools of Guy's and St Thomas' Hospitals; 1982-1998	King's College London School of Medicine and Dentistry; 1998-
King's College Medical School		King's College London School of Medicine and Dentistry; 1998-
Middlesex Hospital Medical School; 1745-1987	University College & Middlesex School of Medicine; 1987-1998	The Royal Free & University College Medical School; 1998-2008 renamed UCL Medical School; 2008-
University College Hospital Medical School; 1834-1987	University College & Middlesex School of Medicine; 1987-1998	The Royal Free & University College Medical School; 1998-2008 renamed UCL Medical School; 2008-
Royal Free Hospital Medical School; 1874-1998		The Royal Free & University College Medical School; 1998-2008 renamed UCL Medical School; 2008-
St Bartholomew's Hospital Medical College	Barts and The London School of Medicine and Dentistry	
The London Hospital Medical College	Barts and The London School of Medicine and Dentistry	
Royal Veterinary College; 2009-

=== Shield winners ===
1867 Guy's

1868 St George's

1869 King's

1870 King's

1871 Guy's

1872 Guy's

1873 Barts

1874 King's

1875 St George's

1876 St George's

1877 Guy's

1878 Guy's

1879 St Thomas's

1880 St Thomas's

1881 St Thomas's

1882 St Thomas's

1883 St Thomas's

1884 London

1885 Barts

1886 Barts

1887 Barts

1888 Barts

1889 Barts

1890 Barts

1891 Barts

1892 Guy's

1893 Guy's

1894 Barts

1895 Guy's

1896 St Mary's

1897 St Mary's

1898 St Mary's

1899 Barts

1900 St Mary's

1901 Barts

1902 Barts

1903 Barts

1904 London

1905 London

1906 London

1907 London

1908 Barts

1909 London

1910 London St Thomas

1911 London

1912 London

1913 London

1914 London

1915

1916

1917

1918

1919

1920 Guy's

1921 King's

1922 Guy's

1923 Barts

1924 Guy's

1925 Barts

1926 Guy's

1927 Guy's

1928 Guy's

1929 Guy's

1930 St Thomas's

1931 St Thomas's

1932 St Thomas's

1933 Barts

1934 Barts

1935 Guy's

1936

1937 Guy's

1938

1939 London

1940

1941

1942

1943

1944

1945

1946

1947 Guy's

1948 Barts

1949 Barts

1950

1951

1952 London

1953 London

1954 St Mary's

1955 London

1956 Guy's

1957 Guy's

1958 Guy's

1959 St Mary's

1960

1961 St Mary's

1962 St Mary's

1963 St Thomas's

1964 Guy's

1965

1966 Guy's

1967 Guy's

1968 Guy's

1969 Guy's

1970 Guy's

1971 Guy's

1972 Guy's

1973 Guy's

1974 Guy's

1975 Barts

1976 Barts

1977 Westminster

1978 Westminster

1979 Westminster

1980 King's

1981

1982 St Thomas's

1983 St Thomas's

1984

1985

1986 Guy's

1987

1988

1989

1990 St Mary's

1991 St Mary's

1992 St Mary's

1993 St Mary's

1994 St Mary's

1995 Barts

1996 Barts and the London

1997 Barts and the London

1998 Barts and the London

1999 Barts and the London

2000 Barts and the London

2001 Barts and the London

2002 Barts and the London

2003 Barts and the London

2004 ICSM

2005 ICSM

2006 ICSM

2007 ICSM

2008 ICSM

2009 ICSM

2010 ICSM

2011 ICSM

2012 ICSM

2013 ICSM

2014 ICSM

2015 ICSM

2016 GKT (King's College)

2017 St George's

2018 The Royal Veterinary College

2019 St George's

2021 St George's

== See also ==
- United Hospitals
- United Hospitals RFC
- United Hospitals Lawn Tennis Club
