= United Hospitals Boat Club =

British Rowing Club

- Location: Chiswick, London
- Home water: Tideway
- Founded: 1885
- Membership: London Medical Schools
- University: United Hospitals (University of London and Imperial College London)
Colours
- Affiliations: British Rowing
- Website: www.uhboatclub.co.uk
- Acronym: UHBC

Events
- UH Autumn Regatta and Allom Cup, UH Winter Regatta, UH Head, UH Bumps

United Hospitals Boat Club (UHBC) is the rowing club of United Hospitals - a group made up of the four medical schools of the University of London, the Royal Veterinary College, and Imperial College School of Medicine.

== Members ==
Membership of UHBC is open to rowing clubs a club representing one of the eligible educational institutions associated with any of the London teaching Hospitals within the University of London or Imperial College London. The current members are:

Blade	Club	Medical School	University/College	Notes
	King's College London School of Medicine Boat Club	King's College London GKT School of Medical Education	King's College London	
	Imperial College School of Medicine Boat Club	Imperial College School of Medicine	Imperial College, London	Not a member of UoL
	Royal Free and University College Medical School Boat Club	Royal Free and University College Medical School	University College London	
	Royal Veterinary College Boat Club		Royal Veterinary College	Not a member of UH MedGroup
	St Bartholomew's and The Royal London Hospitals' Boat Club	Barts and The London School of Medicine and Dentistry	Queen Mary University of London	
	St George's Hospital Medical School Boat Club	St George's Hospital and Medical School	City St George's, University of London	

Former members of UHBC include the boat clubs of Charing Cross Hospital Medical School & St Mary's Hospital Medical School (both now part of ICSM), and Middlesex Hospital Medical School (now part of RUMS).

== Races ==
UHBC organises a number of races on the Tideway each year. While most UH races are open to all clubs rather than only UHBC member clubs to compete, for UHBC members they are significant events as they offer opportunities to compete against other London medical schools.

=== UH Regattas ===
The UH Autumn Regatta is a regatta held in the autumn along a 1000m course of the River Thames between the University of London Boat House and Quintin Boat Club. The UH Winter Regatta is held in January along the same course as the Autumn Regatta. The historic University of London inter-collegiate Allom Cup and Anne Redgrave Cup are also contested as part of UH Autumn Regatta. The Allom Cup itself is competed for by senior men's eights. Senior women's eights compete for the Anne Redgrave Cup. There are also intermediate and novice events.

=== UH Head ===
UH Head is a head race held in the spring term. It is held along a 4400m course from Syon Park Pavillion to Mortlake Anglian and Alpha Boat Club. There are Championship, Senior, Intermedia, and Open categories for eights and coxed fours for both men and women.

=== UH Bumps ===
UH Bumps is a bumps race, a type of rowing race in which a number of boats chase each other in single file, each crew attempting to catch and 'bump' the boat in front without being caught by the boat behind, held in May. It is held along a 4400m course from Syon Park Pavillion to Chiswick Bridge. UH Bumps is open only to UHBC member clubs, UHBC alumni clubs, and other university rowing clubs by invitation.

== See also ==
- University rowing in the United Kingdom
