= Saving Londoners' Lives =

Saving Londoners’ Lives (SLL) is a project with the aim of increasing the number of people in London with emergency life support (ELS) skills by training school children. The project is a partnership between the NHS in London, the Mayor's office, St John Ambulance Prince of Wales District (SJA), British Heart Foundation (BHF), London Ambulance Service NHS Trust (LAS) and students from all five London medical schools to help prevent deaths from heart attacks, accidents and serious diseases, so improving the health of Londoners.

The project brings ELS skills training into London primary and secondary schools using a cost-effective and sustainable model. Teachers and other school staff receive instructor training, equipping them to teach their pupils. Schools receive, at no cost, all the resources and equipment they need to train their pupils. Teachers are supported in the classroom by medical students from London's medical schools who are specially trained by LAS. Training is tailored by each school to fit the ages of their pupils and the range of opportunities presented by the curriculum in a number of subjects.

Evidence shows that children and young people trained in ELS, particularly if instruction is repeated several times during the school years, not only retain the knowledge of what to do, but also the confidence to step in and perform the actions needed when the moment arises.

About 450 (of about 2200) London schools have been recruited into SLL, with over 280,000 pupils on the roll of schools within the scheme and therefore with training opportunities each academic year. The goal of Saving Londoners' Lives is to provide training consistently to every London schoolchild, thus growing a population for London who can act when needed.

SLL has been recognised by awards from the Bupa Foundation (winner 2009), Patient Safety Awards (finalist 2010), Lord Mayor's Dragon Awards (finalist 2010), Health Services Journal Awards (highly commended 2011) and Children and Young People Now Awards (shortlisted, 2012).
