= Uchenna Okoye =

Nigerian cosmetic dentist (1969–2023)

Uchenna Okoye FRSM
- Born: 1969; Anambra State, Nigeria
- Died: 15 September 2023 (aged 53–54)
- Education: Guy’s Hospital dental school
- Known for: Cosmetic dentist and media personality

Uchenna Okoye (1969 – 15 September 2023) was a cosmetic dentist and media personality.

== Career ==
She was the clinical director of the London Smiling Dental Group, and worked at St George's Hospital on what The BMJ described as "difficult, restorative cases".

Okoye was on the board of the British Academy of Cosmetic Dentistry for seven years. She was awarded various honours throughout her career, including European Professional Black Woman of the Year 2006, being voted one of the UK's most influential black women in 2007, and being featured on the Powerlist in 2008.

In 2012 Okoye was described by the Evening Standard as "probably London's only black female cosmetic dentist".

In addition to her clinical work, Okoye regularly appeared as a medical expert on the This Morning show on ITV. She may have been best known for her appearances on 10 Years Younger on Channel 4 and its spin-off on Channel 5.
