= United Hospitals =

Collective name for medical schools in London, England

United Hospials
- Type: Medical School, Students Union
- Academic affiliations: University of London
- Location: London, England
Colours
United Hospitals
College scarves
- GKT (Guy's)
  GKT (St Thomas')
  ICSM
  Barts
  RUMS
  St George's
  Scarf colours: green, with two narrow yellow stripes a quarter of a scarf-width in from either edge
- Website: https://unitedhospitals.weebly.com/

United Hospitals is the historical collective name for the medical schools in London, England. The name originally referred to Guy's Hospital and St Thomas's Hospital and their relationship prior to 1769. It has since been used to describe all London medical schools, which are all part of the University of London (UoL), except the Imperial College School of Medicine (ICSM) which left in 2007. The term is currently used by United Hospitals Medgroup, a joint students' union made up of the five UoL medical schools, and ICSM.

In addition to inter-collegiate UoL competitions, which include all UoL colleges, the United Hospitals are engaged in an active series of sporting, and even comedy events against each other, and also at times as a united team.

== Current Members ==
The current United Hospitals are:

Medical School	University	Teaching Hospitals
King's College London GKT School of Medical Education (GKT)	King's College London	Guy's Hospital · King's College Hospital · St Thomas's Hospital
Imperial College School of Medicine (ICSM)	Imperial College London	Charing Cross Hospital · Chelsea and Westminster Hospital · St Mary's Hospital, London · Hammersmith Hospital
Barts and The London School of Medicine and Dentistry (BL)	Queen Mary University of London	St Bartholomew's Hospital · Royal London Hospital · Newham University Hospital · Whipps Cross University Hospital · Mile End Hospital · Homerton University Hospital
UCL Medical School (RUMS)	University College London	University College Hospital · The Royal Free Hospital · The Whittington Hospital
School of Health & Medical Sciences	City St George's, University of London	St George's Hospital · St Helier Hospital · Epsom Hospital · Kingston Hospital

Medical Student Newspaper is also distributed to the five members, with the editorial team being made up of students from each school. For the purposes of sporting events, the Royal Veterinary College is included in the United Hospitals, as was – until the demise of both hospital and school in the early 1980s – the Royal Dental Hospital School of Dentistry. The five members also contribute to the Saving Londoners' Lives project, sending medical students to deliver emergency life support skills training in schools.

== Former Members ==
The original 13 United Hospitals of London were:

Charing Cross Hospital Medical School; 1818–1984	Charing Cross and Westminster Medical School; 1984–1997	Imperial College School of Medicine; 1997–
Westminster Hospital Medical School; 1834–1984	Charing Cross and Westminster Medical School; 1984–1997	Imperial College School of Medicine; 1997–
St Mary's Hospital Medical School; 1854–1997		Imperial College School of Medicine; 1997–
Royal Postgraduate Medical School; 1935–1997		Imperial College School of Medicine; 1997–
St George's Hospital Medical School; 1733–
St Thomas's Hospital Medical School; 1550–1982	United Medical and Dental Schools of Guy's and St Thomas' Hospitals; 1982–1998	King's College London School of Medicine and Dentistry; 1998–
Guy's Hospital Medical School	United Medical and Dental Schools of Guy's and St Thomas' Hospitals; 1982–1998	King's College London School of Medicine and Dentistry; 1998–
King's College Medical School		King's College London School of Medicine and Dentistry; 1998–
Middlesex Hospital Medical School; 1745–1987	University College & Middlesex School of Medicine; 1987–1998	The Royal Free & University College Medical School; 1998–2008 renamed UCL Medical School; 2008–
University College Hospital Medical School; 1834–1987	University College & Middlesex School of Medicine; 1987–1998	The Royal Free & University College Medical School; 1998–2008 renamed UCL Medical School; 2008–
Royal Free Hospital Medical School; 1874–1998		The Royal Free & University College Medical School; 1998–2008 renamed UCL Medical School; 2008–
St Bartholomew's Hospital Medical College; 1843–1995	Barts and The London School of Medicine and Dentistry	
London Hospital Medical College; 1785–1995	Barts and The London School of Medicine and Dentistry	

== MedGroup ==

MedGroup is the collective body of Students' Union presidents and British Medical Association representatives from each of the five member medical schools. Monthly meetings ensure common workings and sharing of best-practice within the student bodies.. The committee is formed of six positions alongside the presidents of each medical schools students' union; chair, vice-chair, activities officer, education officer, welfare officer and communications officer. The chair is Christian Oldfield (ICSM) and the vice-chair is Ciaran O'Toole (ICSM).

== Sports ==
=== Combined teams ===
- United Hospitals RFC
- United Hospitals Athletics Club
- United Hospitals Boat Club
- United Hospitals Cricket Club
- United Hospitals Football Club
- United Hospitals Hockey Club
- United Hospitals Lawn Tennis Club

Occasionally compete in National Association of Medics Sports

=== Competitions ===
Year	Rugby	Men's Hockey	Women's Hockey	Football	Men's Bumps	Women's Bumps	Cricket	Athletics	Cross Country	Revue	Tennis	Netball	Cricket	Squash	Women's Rugby
2025–26										SGH					
2024–25		ICSM								BL					
2023–24				BL	KCL/GKT		BL			RUMS					
2022–23							BL			BL					
2021–22					ICSM	GKT	SGH	SGH	SGH	SGH					
2020–21					ICSM/KCL	GKT	GKT	Not Held	Not Held	Not Held					
2019–20							GKT	SGH		BL					
2018–19	GKT				BL/KCL	GKT	RUMS	RVC		ICSM					
2017–18	RUMS			SGUL	GKT	GKT	BL	SGH		BL					
2016–17	BL				ICSM	GKT	BL	GKT		RUMS					
2015–16	SGUL				ICSM	GKT	BL			RUMS					
2014–15	RUMS	GKT		BL	ICSM	GKT	BL			RUMS					
2013–14	ICSM	GKT		RUMS	ICSM	SGUL	BL			RUMS					
2012–13	BL	GKT		RUMS	SGUL	SGUL	GKT	ICSM		GKT					
2011–12	BL	ICSM		RUMS	SGUL	SGUL	ICSM	ICSM		SGUL	ICSM				
2010–11	ICSM	ICSM		GKT	GKT	GKT	SGUL	ICSM		SGUL	ICSM		SGUL		
2009–10	ICSM	SGUL	RUMS		GKT	GKT		ICSM		GKT		ICSM			ICSM
2008–09	GKT	Not Played			GKT	GKT	RUMS			RUMS			ICSM		
2007–08	ICSM	SGUL		BL	GKT	RUMS		ICSM		GKT				ICSM	ICSM
2006–07	ICSM	SGUL			GKT	GKT		ICSM		ICSM					ICSM
2005–06	ICSM	SGUL		BL	ICSM	GKT		ICSM		GKT		ICSM	ICSM		
2004–05	ICSM	ICSM		ICSM	ICSM	GKT		SGUL		SGUL			ICSM		
2003–04	ICSM	GKT			ICSM	ICSM	RUMS	ICSM		SGUL					
2002–03	ICSM	GKT	ICSM	ICSM	ICSM	BL				SGUL					
2001–02	ICSM	ICSM			ICSM	BL				First year (not competitive)					
2000–01	GKT	GKT			ICSM	BL				–	ICSM				
1999–2000	ICSM	GKT		ICSM	GKT	ICSM				–	ICSM				
1998–99	ICSM	ICSM		ICSM	ICSM	ICSM				–	ICSM				
1997–98	ICSM		ICSM	ICSM	ICSM	ICSM				-	ICSM				
