= Stuart Reid (veterinarian) =

British veterinary surgeon and academic leader

Professor Stuart W. J. Reid CBE FRSB FRSE FRCVS

President & Principal of the Royal Veterinary College
- Incumbent
- Assumed office January 2011
- Preceded by: Quintin McKellar

Personal details
- Born: Stuart W. J. Reid
- Education: University of Glasgow
- Occupation: Veterinary surgeon; academic; higher education administrator
- Known for: Veterinary epidemiology; One Health; academic leadership
- Salary: £414,000
- Awards: RCVS's Queen's Medal (2024); CBE (2018); BVA's Dalrymple-Champneys Cup (2016); BVA's Wooldridge Medal (2010); Petplan Charitable Trust Scientific Award (2010); Pfizer Academic Award (1996)

Stuart W. J. Reid is a British veterinary surgeon, academic and higher-education leader. He has served since January 2011 as president and principal of the Royal Veterinary College, at the University of London.

== Early life and education ==
Reid graduated in veterinary medicine (Bachelor of Veterinary Science or BVMS) from the University of Glasgow in 1987. He completed his PhD at the same university in 1992, with a thesis entitled The equine sarcoid: molecular and epidemiological studies in Equus asinus.

== Career ==
After completing his PhD, Reid worked in veterinary practice in Aberdeenshire. He returned to the University of Glasgow as Associate Dean (Research) in 2004 and became Dean in 2005.

In January 2011, Reid joined the Royal Veterinary College (RVC), University of London, as president and principal. During his tenure at RVC, he also served as president of the Royal College of Veterinary Surgeons (RCVS) in 2014–2015.

== Royal Veterinary College ==
During his tenure at the Royal Veterinary College (RVC) from January 2011, Reid oversaw substantial institutional developments. He led the RVC through a sustained period of financial stability, a growth in student numbers of approximately 20%, and an increase in annual income by roughly 70%. In May 2025, the RVC announced that he would continue as president and principal through to autumn 2028, in recognition of the strategic challenges facing veterinary education and higher education more broadly. In addition, he took on, in 2021, the role as chair of the Veterinary Schools Council, the representative body for veterinary schools in the UK, Ireland and the Netherlands, reinforcing his leadership in the education sector.

== Royal College of Veterinary Surgeons ==
While serving as president of the Royal College of Veterinary Surgeons (RCVS) in 2014-2015, Reid guided the adoption of a new royal charter which formally recognised veterinary nurses as a regulated profession and authorised the RCVS council to establish new classes of membership. His presidency also emphasised global standards of veterinary education and explored the introduction of the courtesy title "Dr" for United Kingdom veterinary surgeons. In recognition of his career contributions, Reid received the RCVS's Queen's Medal in 2024 — the highest honour the college can bestow for a distinguished career in veterinary science, education, and leadership.
