= Clare Bryant =

British veterinarian and pharmacologist

- Education: Royal Veterinary College; University of London
- Scientific career
- Workplaces: University of Cambridge
- Thesis: A study of the cardiovascular pharmacology of medetomidine (1993)

Clare Bryant is a British veterinary scientist and clinical pharmacologist who is a professor at the University of Cambridge. She specialises in innate immunity. Bryant is a Fellow of Queens' College, Cambridge and of the British Pharmacological Society.

== Early life and education ==
Bryant was an undergraduate in biochemistry and physiology at the University of Southampton. She trained in veterinary medicine in London. She was supported by the Wellcome Trust to complete a doctorate. Her research first concentrated on anaesthesia, but soon shifted focus to concentrate on receptor pharmacology. She spent four years as a Wellcome Trust postdoctoral fellow with John Vane at the William Harvey Research Institute. She started her independent career at the University of Cambridge.

== Research and career ==
Bryant studies how hosts recognise bacteria using pattern recognition receptors (PRR). She is interested in how these PRR are related to chronic inflammatory diseases, for example Alzheimer's disease. There are several different types of PRR, including Toll-like receptors and NOD-like receptors. She is particularly interested in the PRRs that detect Salmonella enterica. Bryant has studied how ligands on the outer-membranes of bacteria (for example, lipopolysaccharides like endotoxin) interact with PRR to recruit signalling molecules.

Bryant's research demonstrated the power of Fluorescence Resonance Energy Transfer (FRET) and single-molecule fluorescence microscopy to understand the function of toll-like receptors and super resolution microscopy to determine the function of NOD-like receptors to work out how these PRRs form signalling. When allergens are contaminated by endotoxins they can be detected by toll-like receptors. By preventing this detection, Bryant believes it may be possible to design inhibitors that suppress the onset of allergenic responses. As the proteins produced in neuroinflammatory diseases such as Alzheimer's and Parkinson's are recognised by toll-like receptors and induce inflammation, these studies may identify novel treatments for neurodegenerative conditions.

In 2023, Bryant was elected a Fellow of the Learned Society of Wales. She was elected a Fellow of the Academy of Medical Sciences in 2025.

== Selected publications ==
- Simon D Harding; Joanna L. Sharman; Elena Faccenda; et al. (1 January 2018). "The IUPHAR/BPS Guide to PHARMACOLOGY in 2018: updates and expansion to encompass the new guide to IMMUNOPHARMACOLOGY". Nucleic Acids Research. 46 (D1): D1091–D1106. doi:10.1093/nar/gkx1121. ISSN 0305-1048. PMC 5753190. PMID 29149325. Wikidata Q47139831.
- Evanna L Mills; Beth Kelly; Angela Logan; et al. (22 September 2016). "Succinate Dehydrogenase Supports Metabolic Repurposing of Mitochondria to Drive Inflammatory Macrophages". Cell. 167 (2): 457-470.e13. doi:10.1016/j.cell.2016.08.064. ISSN 0092-8674. PMC 5863951. PMID 27667687. Wikidata Q46485595.
- Clare Bryant; Katherine A Fitzgerald (26 August 2009). "Molecular mechanisms involved in inflammasome activation". Trends in Cell Biology. 19 (9): 455–464. doi:10.1016/j.tcb.2009.06.002. ISSN 0962-8924. PMID 19716304. Wikidata Q37588947.
