= Queen Mother Hospital for Animals =

Geography
- Location: Hawkshead Ln, Brookmans Park, Hatfield AL9 7TA, England
- Coordinates: 51.714145°N 0.208065°W

Organisation
- Type: Specialist
- Affiliated university: Royal Veterinary College

Services
- Speciality: Veterinary hospital

History
- Opened: 1986

Links
- Lists: Hospitals in England

The Queen Mother Hospital for Animals (QMHA) is a teaching hospital located near Potters Bar, Hertfordshire. More than 100 veterinary nurses work alongside students, residents, interns, and specialty surgeons.

In 2008 the Royal Veterinary College completed the third phase of development of the QMHA. This development supports the continued expansion of both secondary and tertiary medical and surgical services for small animals, built around support services such as Emergency and Critical Care, Anaesthesia and Diagnostic Imaging. It first opened in 1986.

There is also a strategic focus on the development of first opinion small animal services at the Beaumont Animals’ Hospital, serving the Kings Cross, London area.
