= Frederick Hobday =

Veterinary surgeon (1869–1939)

- Born: 4 November 1869; Burton-on-Trent
- Died: 24 June 1939 (aged 69); Droitwich
- Occupation: veterinary surgeon

Sir Frederick Thomas George Hobday (4 November 1869 – 24 June 1939) was a British veterinary surgeon who served as President of the Royal Veterinary College 1927 to 1937. The college holds an annual lecture entitled the Frederick Hobday Memorial Address. He was the official veterinary surgeon to Queen Alexandra from 1912 to 1939.

He made major advances to animal anaesthesia and to small animal surgery. He also invented a series of thermometers, specific to different animal types.

The term "to Hobday" a horse, is a treatment for recurrent laryngeal neuropathy in which the left side of the horse's larynx is weak or paralysed, reducing the ability to perform at high speeds and creating the characteristic noise of a "roarer". The Hobday procedure involves removal of the horse’s left vocal cord along with two adjacent pouches, to reduce turbulence and noise to improve deep breathing during racing. This stems from a practice created by Karl Adolf Gunther but refined by Hobday.

== Life ==
He was born on 4 November 1869 in Burton-on-Trent the son of Thomas Hobday, a manager in the Bass Brewery, and his wife, Mary Newbold. He was educated at Burton Grammar School. He left school around 1883 and began working in his uncle’s coal merchant business but then decided to apprentice as a veterinary surgeon under Alfred Hodgkins in Hanley Staffordshire. He studied at the Royal Veterinary College 1888 to 1892.

In 1903 he was elected a Fellow of the Royal Society of Edinburgh. His proposers were James Cossar Ewart, Sir German Sims Woodhead, Edward Albert Sharpey-Schafer, and John Berry Haycraft. In the First World War he served as a Major in the Royal Army Veterinary Corps and saw active service in France, Italy and Albania with King Edward's Horse Regiment. He was in command of the No 22 Veterinary Hospital at Abbeville, the largest hospital for mules and horses on the western front. He was twice Mentioned in Dispatches.

After the war he lived at 31 Argyll Road in Kensington, a pleasant Victorian terraced house. He was knighted in 1933 and received an honorary doctorate (DSc) from the University of Zurich in the same year. In 1937 he was made an Honorary Fellow of the Royal Society of London. He died in Droitwich on 24 June 1939.

== Family ==
In 1895, he married Mrs Elizabeth Chambers, a widow of a fellow veteran. They had one son and one daughter.

== Publications ==
- Surgical Diseases of the Cat and Dog (1901)
- Fifty Years a Veterinary Surgeon (1938)
