= London Universities and Colleges Athletics =

London Universities & Colleges Athletics
- Sport: University Athletics in London, UK
- Abbreviation: LUCA
- Founded: 2015
- Location: London; United Kingdom
- Chairman: James L. Findon
- Replaced: London Colleges League (LCL); London Colleges Athletics Series (LACS)

Official website
- www.london-athletics.com
- (United Kingdom)

London Universities and Colleges Athletics (LUCA) is the representative and governing body for university athletics in London.

LUCA was formed in June 2015 following a merger of the London Colleges League (LCL) and the London Colleges Athletics Series (LCAS) competitions. LUCA is responsible for organising all competitions exclusive to university athletics clubs in London. This includes the United Hospitals Athletics Shield. LUCA also organises development and volunteering programs.

LUCA is a membership organisation open to clubs of higher education establishments in London. The University of Reading and the University of Bedfordshire are the only universities outside London permitted to join LUCA. Only members of LUCA can score points in LUCA competitions but guests can often compete.

LUCA won the England Athletics, London region award for 'Best Project' in 2016.

== History ==
LUCA was established by a merger of the organising committees of LCAS and LCL in July, 2015 in London. A constitutional committee consisting of LCL secretary, Jonny Laybourn (University College London), LCAS chairman, James Findon (King's College London) and AYAG chair, Jacob Hood (University of East London) was immediately established to draft the LUCA constitution.

== Mission and Role ==
According to the LUCA constitution, the objectives of LUCA are:

a) To improve the sport of athletics and promote it within the higher education sector in London in light of its unifying, educational, cultural and health values.

b) To organise its own competitions in London and strive to cover all disciplines of athletics

== Competitions ==
LUCA organises four main athletics competitions. LUCA is also responsible for maintaining championship records at each of these events.

Competition	Format	Established
LUCA Cross Country League	Five races in different locations around London. Held every year	Circa 1960
LUCA Indoor Championships	Held every year. Incorporates the UofL Intercollegiate Track and Field Championship and UH Athletics Championship	2015
LUCA Outdoor Series	Three track and field meets. Held every year.	2015
LUCA London Students' Run	Mass participation 5k and 10K	2016

=== LUCA Cross Country League ===
The London Colleges League (LCL) is the long-standing cross country league for higher education institutions in London to compete in. From 2017 it became the 'LUCA Cross Country League'. The league is normally made up of five or six races held across two terms. Each race is hosted by a different university/college. Traditionally, the first race is hosted by UCL at Parliament Hill and the final is hosted by St Mary's University, Twickenham at Bushy Park. In the 2017–18 season, the final fixture was moved to Wormwood Scrubs.

Athletes are awarded points at each race. The athlete with the most points at the end of the league wins the championship. Points are also counted towards team totals. Starting in the 2018/19 season, a new trophy will be awarded to the team with the most points across men's and women's races. This trophy will be named in honor of the late Mike Baggs, who was the league's longest serving secretary.

Past Champions:

1999 Men: Neil Speaight (Brunell) Women: Bethan Hopewell (Imperial College)

2000 Men: William Levett (Brunell) Women: Dorothea Lee (Imperial College)

2001 Men: Andy Hennessy (University College London) Women: Suzanne McCormick (Reading)

2002 Men: Lee McCash (St. Mary's) Women: Jade Wright (St. Mary's)

2003 Men: Andy Toward (St. Mary's) Women: Ariane Pritchard (Reading)

2004 Men: Dennis Fricks (London School of Economics) Women: Eleanor Baker (Brunell)

2005 Men: Phil Wicks (Royal Holloway) Women: Nina Griffith (University College)

2006 Men: Matt Ashton (St. Mary's) Women: Vicky Callaway (St. Mary's)

2007 Men: Ben Tyler (Brunell) Women: Bryony Proctor (St. Mary's)

2008 Men: Jack Tyler (Brunell) Women: Sarah Luck (King's College)

2009 Men: James Teuten (Imperial College) Women: Sarah Luck (King's College)

2010 Men: Alex Milne (Imperial College) Women: Emily Moss (Royal Holloway)

2011 Men: Matt Withey (St. Mary's) Women: Emily Moss (Royal Holloway)

2012 Men: Adam Clarke (St. Mary's) Women: Emily Bliss (University College)

2013 Men: Jason Prickett (St. Mary's) Women: Emily Hosker-Thornhill (St. Mary's)

2014 Men: Matt Withey (St. Mary's) Women: Rachel Gifford (Brunell)

2015 Men: Karl Billington (St. Mary's) Women: Alex Mundell (Imperial College)

2016 Men: Jacob Allen (St. Mary's) Women: Typhaine Christiaen (London School of Economics)

2017 Men: Duncan Tomlin (Courtauld Institute of Art) Women: Emma Dixon (Royal Veterinary College)

2018 Men: Paddy Roddy (University College) Women: Philippa Bowden (Brunell)

2019 Men: Thomas Butler (St. Mary's) Women: Georgia Curry (Imperial College)

=== LUCA Indoor Championships ===
The Indoor Championships is an indoor track and field event established in 2015 for higher education institutions in London. It replaced the University of London Intercollegiate Track and Field Championships ('UL Indoors') as London's indoor fixture for university track and field. The event includes three separate championships that are run together; The LUCA Championships (David Morgan Cup), the University of London Intercollegiate Track and Field Championships and the United Hospitals Athletics Shield.

=== LUCA Outdoor Series ===
The Outdoor Series (previously known as the 'London College Athletics Series' (LCAS)) is a track and field series established in 2015 for higher education institutions in London to compete in. The inaugural series was won be King's College London. UCL won the series in 2016 and 2017.

== Members ==
There are 23 members in total, including the alumni club Motspur AC.

Barts and the London Running Club

Brunel Athletics

Goldsmiths University Running Club

Imperial College Cross Country and Athletics Club

King's College London Athletics, Running and Cross-Country Club

Kingston University Tri-Club

London School of Economics Athletics and Running Club

Motspur AC

Middlesex University

Queen Mary Running and Athletics Club

Reading University Knights Athletics

Roehampton University Athletics Club

Royal Holloway Athletics and Cross Country Club

Royal Veterinary College Triathlon Club

SOAS Running Club

St George's Hospital Athletics Club

St Mary's University Athletics Club

University College London Running, Athletics and Cross-Country Club

University of Bedfordshire Athletics Club

University of East London Athletics Club

University of Essex Athletics Club

University of Greenwich Athletics and Running Club

University of London Athletics Club

University of Kent Athletics & Cross Country Club
