= Allom Cup =

Annual rowing event in London, England

The Allom Cup regatta is a rowing event held every November (or early December) on the River Thames in London. It is contested by the constituent colleges of the University of London. Imperial College School of Medicine still competes despite Imperial College London separating from the University of London in 2007.

The Allom Cup itself is competed for by senior men's eights. Senior women's eights compete for the Anne Redgrave Cup. There are also intermediate and novice events.

== Recent winners ==
Year	Allom Cup	Redgrave Cup
1949	King's College London	
1950	King's College London	
1951	University College London	
1952	University College London	
1954	Imperial College	
1955	Imperial College	
1962	Royal Veterinary College	
1969	Middlesex Hospital	
1979	Imperial College	
1991	Charing Cross and Westminster Medical School	
1998	King's College London	
1999	King's College London	
2000	King's College London	
2001	King's College London	
2002	King's College London	
2003	King's College London	
2004	King's College London	
2005	King's College London	
2006	King's College London	
2007	QMULBC	St George's Hospital
2008	University College London (UCL)	RUMSBC
2009	St George's Hospital	RUMSBC
2010	GKTBC/King's College London	
2011	University College London (UCL)	ICSM
2012	St George's Hospital	RUMSBC
2013	ICSM	University College London (UCL)
2014	ICSM	
2015	ICSM	
2019	London School of Economics	RUMSBC
2020	Cancelled due to COVID-19 pandemic	
2021	ICSM/UCL	GKTBC/King's College London
2022	ICSM	GKTBC/King's College London
2023	ICSM	ICSM
2025	RUMS	Royal Free University College Middlesex School of Medicine

== See also ==
- List of British and Irish varsity matches
- University rowing in the United Kingdom
