= United Hospitals Lawn Tennis Club =

United Hospitals' Lawn Tennis Club
- Sport: Lawn Tennis
- Founded: 1887
- Based in: London
- President: Professor Peter Mortimer
- Website: www.uhltc.co.uk

The United Hospitals' Lawn Tennis Club is the combined lawn tennis club of the five medical schools in London. The constituent medical schools collaboratively form a Men's and Ladies team which competes at a high standard against various organizations. The club plays annual matches against the University of Oxford and University of Cambridge. Additional opponents who have been played against include the Royal Navy, the Royal Air Force, the British Army, the London School of Economics, University College London and the Queen's Club. The individual medical schools also compete against one another in a tournament taking place over the summer. There is also a one-day mixed doubles tournament in the winter with individual pairs from each medical school competing against one another. Finally, there is the annual President's match, whereby the President chooses a team of alumni to play against a team chosen from the student body by the Men's and Women's captains. This match takes place at the All England Lawn Tennis Club.

== History ==
The constituent teams of the tennis club are from Bart's and the London Medical School, Imperial College School of Medicine, King's College London GKT School of Medical Education, St George's University of London and University College London Medical School. The club originally consisted of thirteen London medical schools but over the course of the 20th Century mergers with the major educational institutions of London consolidated this to the now-established five schools.

The medical schools compete against each other for The Inter Hospital Lawn Tennis Challenge Cup established in 1887. It is one of the oldest tennis tournaments in the world for which the original trophy is still competed. The trophy was commissioned in the same year as the All England's famous men's trophy and continues to be played for on an annual basis. The trophy was lost for a thirty-year period towards the latter stages of the 20th century but was rediscovered. The 2012-2013 tournament year was decided without a victor due to a fixtures discrepancy. The cup was thus not awarded as reported in the medical student newspaper

The club has built on its historical foundations and has over eighty active members to this day. The club is run by a committee of elected students, an alumni committee, several Vice-Presidents and the President, Professor Peter Mortimer.

Past presidents

Sir Marcus Setchell

Notable Alumni

JPR Williams

== Medical schools ==
| Medical School | Established | Nickname | Crest | Founding Medical School(s) (Foundation Date) | UH Cup Victories |
|---|---|---|---|---|---|
| Barts and The London School of Medicine and Dentistry | 1995 | Bart's | | St Bartholomew's Hospital Medical College (1822) The Royal London Hospital Medical College (1785) | |
| Imperial College School of Medicine | 1997 | ICSM | | Charing Cross Hospital Medical School (1818) Westminster Hospital Medical School (1834) St Mary's Hospital Medical School (1854) Royal Postgraduate Medical School (1935) | |
| King's College London GKT School of Medical Education | 1998 | GKT | | St Thomas' Hospital Medical School (1550) Guy's Hospital Medical School (1825) King's College Hospital Medical School (1908) | |
| St George's, University of London | 1836 | St George's | | St George's, University of London (1733) | |
| University College London Medical School | 1998 | RUMS | | University College Hospital Medical School (1834) Middlesex Hospital Medical School (1746) Royal Free Hospital Medical School (1874) | |

== Tournaments ==
Men's Doubles League (Awarded the Inter Hospital Lawn Tennis Challenge Cup since 1887)

Women's Doubles League (Awarded the Mortimer Shield)

Mixed Doubles Summer League (Awarded the Mixed Doubles Shield)

Mixed Doubles Tournament (Awarded the MPS Shield)

== Exhibition matches ==
Matches are played across the year against a host of prestigious clubs, including:

Cambridge University Tennis Club; Oxford University Tennis Club; Army Women's Tennis Team and Queen's Club.

There are also inter-club matches, notably:

President's Day; Alumni vs Students Doubles Match and an Alumni Social Doubles Day.

== Leadership ==
| Role | Committee Member |
|---|---|
| President | Professor Peter Mortimer |
| Vice-President | Dr Nick Perry; Dr David Stewart; Mr Thomas Setchell; Mr Giles Stafford; Dr Tanya Patrick; Dr Pauline Scheelbeek, Dr Oli Davies and Dr James Taylor |
| Alumni Committee | Dr Dominic Fritche and Dr Maria Kyriakides |
| Student Committee | Gareth Goh; Anaiya Kaka; Mariana Veiga; Izem Ozavci and Misha Iyer |
| Previous Student Committees | Hassan Mahfouz; Vivian Graf; Tugce Tugcu; Maria Pisliakova and Anavi Prakash |

== Other events ==
The club holds an Annual General Meeting at Royal Air Force Club (RAF). It is attended by the President, Vice-Presidents, alumni, student committee and student members.

The annual UH Christmas dinner 2021 was hosted at the Queen's Club.

== See also ==
- United Hospitals
- UH Rugby
- United Hospitals Cup
