= Sheo Bhagwan Tibrewal =

Indian born UK-based orthopedic surgeon

- Born: Bihar, India
- Occupation: Orthopedic surgeon
- Parent: Mohan Tibrewal
- Awards: Padma Shri; Pride of India Gold Award

Sheo Bhagwan Tibrewal is an Indian born UK-based orthopedic surgeon. He is a Research Fellow at University of Oxford and an Honorary Senior Lecturer at King's College London GKT School of Medical Education. Born to Mohan Tibrewal, he graduated in medicine in 1973 from Ranchi University.

Tibrewal, who is listed in the Marquis Who's Who, is associated with several hospitals in London, including the Queen Elizabeth Hospital, London, as a consultant. He is also associated with the Advanced Medicare and Research Institute, Kolkata, as a mentor. The NRI Institute, a London-based organization of Indian expatriates in the UK awarded him the Pride of India Gold Award in 2004. The Government of India awarded him the fourth highest civilian honour of the Padma Shri, in 2007, for his contributions to Medicine.
