= Phily Bowden =

British long-distance runner

Personal information
- Born: Philippa Bowden; March 29, 1995 (age 31)
- Home town: Bracknell, Berkshire, UK
- Spouse: Daniel Leadbitter (2025-present)
- Website: philybowden.com

Sport
- Country: Great Britain
- Sport: Athletics
- Events: 5,000 m, 10,000 m, Marathon
- Coached by: Helen Clitheroe (2020–2024); Jon Green (2024–present)

Philippa "Phily" Bowden (born March 29, 1995) is a British long-distance runner.

== Early life and education ==
Bowden studied psychology at Brunel University of London, where she was a sports scholar. She began but did not complete a master's program at the University of Oregon. Bowden recovered from anorexia prior to beginning at the University of Oregon, but the weight-focused culture of the athletics program, which Bowden has since publicly criticized, caused her to relapse.

== Career ==
=== Early career and university (2013–2019) ===
Bowden competed for the Bracknell Athletics Club. She won silver in the 2014 Berkshire Cross Country Championships women's under 20 race.

She then competed for Brunel University's athletics team. As a junior, she placed in the top 100 and generally considered herself 'average.' She won her first three races in the LUCA Cross-Country league in 2017. She competed at the U23 European Championships, placing 13th at the 2017 Euro Cross in Slovakia and was part of the gold medal-winning Great Britain and Northern Ireland team. In 2018, she won bronze at the British Universities and Colleges (BUCS) Cross Country Championships, finishing within four seconds of the gold medalist. She won silver in the 5,000 m at the 2018 BUCS Athletics Championships, with a time of 16:18.77.

Bowden ran track for the University of Oregon Ducks, beginning in August 2018. She placed 97th in her debut NCAA Division One Cross-Country Championships and was 17th in the PAC-12 Conference. With two terms remaining, she left the programme in December 2019. She left due to a "problematic culture" in the athletics program that place an emphasis on weight, to the detriment of her mental health.

=== Post-university (2019–present) ===
Bowden began training with Helen Clitheroe in London as part of Team New Balance Manchester. She won the 2021 Reading Half Marathon with a time of 1:13:29. She pivoted to marathon running and made her marathon debut in 2022 in Seville with a time of 2:34:30. She competed for Great Britain and Northern Ireland at the European Cup in the women's 10,000m. At the 2023 Copenhagen Marathon, Bowden finished in 2:29:16, taking five minutes off her personal best and placing 29th in the all-time rankings for England and third overall in the women's marathon that year.

She set a personal best of 2:29:14 at the Houston Marathon in 2024. While in the United States in the final block of training for the Houston Marathon, Bowden met Jon Green, the head coach at Verde Track Club. She left Team New Balance Manchester, and announced in July 2024 that she had signed with On Running. Alongside this change, she began being coached by Green.

Bowden placed 15th in the women's competition at the 2024 Berlin Marathon, running a new personal best of 2:25:47, ranking her ninth on the UK all-time list. She placed 11th overall in the women's elite race at the 2025 London Marathon and was the third fastest British woman. In 2025, she suffered from a knee injury which led to her withdrawing from the 2025 Chicago Marathon. In 2026, she ran her first marathon since 2024 and placed 17th in the women's competition in the 2026 New York City Marathon, running 2:30:45.

Bowden's next professional goal is to be on Team Great Britain in the 2028 LA Olympics.

== Personal life ==
Bowden returned to the United Kingdom in 2019. She lived in Reading, before leaving her full-time job as a civil servant in London and relocating to Manchester. On September 30, 2021, Bowden created her YouTube channel and currently (October 2026) has 225K subscribers. Bowden's videos focus on the highs and lows of being a professional runner and inspiration for other runners. Bowden married long-time partner, Daniel Leadbitter, in June 2025.
