= Royal Veterinary College =

Veterinary school in London, college of the University of London

Coordinates: 51.5368°N 0.1340°W

- Coat of arms
- Motto: Latin: Venienti Occurrite Morbo
- Motto in English: Confront disease at onset
- Type: Public veterinary school
- Established: 1791; 235 years ago (became a constituent part of University of London in 1949)
- Parent institution: University of London
- Affiliations: Universities UK
- Endowment: £11.5 million (2025)
- Budget: £128.1 million (2024/25)
- Chancellor: The Princess Royal (University of London)
- Principal: Stuart Reid
- Students: 2,575 (2024/25)
- Undergraduates: 2,120 (2024/25)
- Postgraduates: 455 (2024/25)
- Location: London and Hertfordshire, United Kingdom
- Campus: Urban
Colours
- Website: rvc.ac.uk

The Royal Veterinary College (informally the RVC) is a veterinary school located in London and a member institution of the federal University of London. The RVC was founded in 1791 and joined the University of London in 1949. It is the oldest and largest veterinary school in the United Kingdom, and one of only 12 in the country where students can study to become a vet.

== History ==
=== 18th century ===
The Veterinary College of London was founded in 1791 by a group led by Granville Penn, a grandson of William Penn, following the foundation of the first veterinary college in Europe in Lyon, France, in 1762. The promoters wished to select a site close to the metropolis, but far enough away to minimise the temptations open to the students, who were all men. Earl Camden was just then making arrangements to develop some fields he owned to the north of London, and he replied to the college's newspaper advertisement for a suitable site with an offer to sell it some of his land. The site was rural, but urban developments appeared on all sides in the early decades of the 19th century, creating Camden Town.

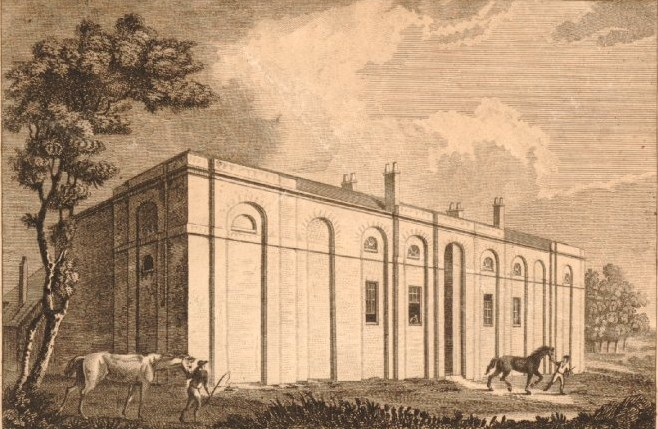
Veterinary College, London, the original building, 1804 engraving.

Charles Benoit Vial de St Bel of the Lyon establishment was appointed as the first principal of the new college. The first students, just four of them, began their studies in 1792, and the first horse was admitted for treatment in 1793. St Bel died later that year and was succeeded by Edward Coleman, who managed the college for nearly forty six years and established its reputation. Among the first students were Delabere Pritchett Blaine and Bracy Clark. In its early years it was mainly concerned with horses, but the range of animals covered gradually increased. The original building was a quadrangle in a neoclassical style, and there was a paddock on the opposite side of Royal College Street, but this was later sold for housing development.

In 1796 John Shipp was the first qualified veterinary surgeon to join the British Army.

=== 19th century ===
The college first acquired royal patronage from King George IV. In 1844 it was awarded a royal charter.

In 1865 RVC Professor James Beart Simonds was appointed as the first Chief Inspector and Veterinary Advisor to the Privy council, with particular regard to cattle plague.

In 1875 college was granted a royal charter as the Royal Veterinary College; it remains the only veterinary college in the UK to have its own royal charter.

In 1879 the Cheap Practice Clinic was established, later known as the Poor People's Out-Patients Clinic. Some veterinary surgeons were concerned that the college was threatening their livelihoods, but the college argued that poor people could not afford veterinary fees, therefore their animals would go untreated if the Clinic were closed.

The college celebrated its centenary in 1891 and in that year the Students' Union was founded. In 1895 the first X-ray machine was acquired.

=== 20th century ===
There was a major renovation in 1907 of the college horse boxes, which had fund-raisers' commemorative shields hung at their doorways.

Women were admitted to the college after the Sex Disqualification (Removal) Act 1919 came into force. The first women were admitted in 1927.

In 1924 the Research Institute in Animal Pathology was built, headed by Professor John McFadyean.

Various extensions were added to the Camden Town site over the years. The buildings had become obsolete and in 1927 were officially declared dangerous structures. A fund-raising scheme for the total rebuilding of the college was launched by the new principal, Professor Sir Frederick Hobday.

In 1932 the Beaumont Animals' Hospital opened.

New buildings were opened by King George VI in November 1937.

During the Second World War, the RVC evacuated to Streatley, Berkshire, although the Beaumont Animals' Hospital remained open at Camden Town.

In 1949 the RVC became a school of the University of London.

In 1958 the Hawkshead field station, in Hertfordshire, was officially opened by Queen Elizabeth II.

In the 1980s the Royal Veterinary College Animal Care Trust was launched with the Queen Elizabeth the Queen Mother as patron, and the Queen Mother Hospital for Animals was opened at Hawkshead by the Queen Mother. Princess Anne, the Princess Royal, and Chancellor of the University of London, opened the surgical wing of the Sefton Equine Referral Hospital.

The bicentenary celebrations were held in 1991. The skeleton of the famous racehorse Eclipse, dissected in 1789 by St. Bel was once more the property of the RVC and was placed on display in the museum at Hawkshead.

Geoffrey Mead was appointed to the "Vestey Chair of Food Safety and Veterinary Public Health" in 1992, mentioned in a 2000 book, and described by a third party as "the first post of its kind in the UK"; however a search of the RVC website in August 2020 does not reveal any mention of Vestey or such a chair.

=== 21st century ===
The London BioScience Innovation Centre was opened in 2001.

The Learning Resource Centre (Eclipse Building) was officially opened at Hawkshead by the Queen in October 2003. The Large Animal Clinical Centre was officially opened by Prince Philip The Duke of Edinburgh in October 2003.

In 2005 the Duchess of Cornwall visited the Hawkshead Campus as new Patron of the Royal Veterinary College Animal Care Trust.

The LIVE Centre at Hawkshead was officially opened by The Princess Royal in February 2007.

Stuart Reid was appointed principal of the RVC in late 2010.

== Campuses ==
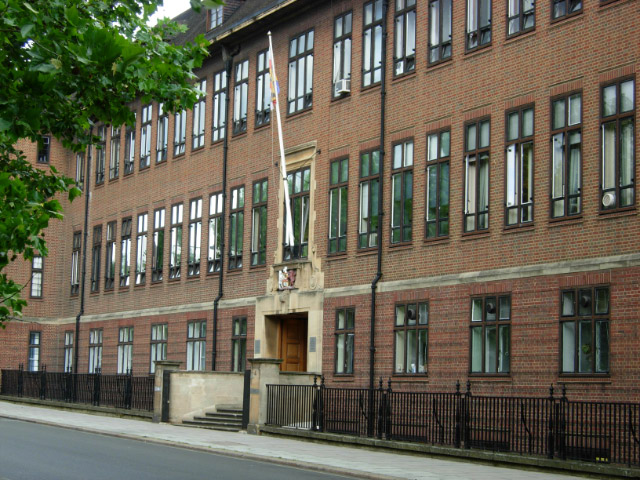
The frontage of the Camden campus of the RVC

The RVC has two campuses, one in Camden in Central London and the other near Potters Bar in Hertfordshire. On the Bachelor of Veterinary Medicine course, students spend two years in Camden followed by three years in Potters Bar.

The 1930s buildings on Royal College Street in Camden Town, near St Pancras railway station remain, with minor extensions. Around half of the undergraduate students are based there at any one time. The Camden campus is also home to the main bulk of the RVC Student Union (RVCSU), including the main college bar, the Haxby.

The Hawkshead Campus is located in Brookmans Park, rural Hertfordshire, about 17 miles (27 km) north of central London, was officially opened by Queen Elizabeth II in 1959. The majority of the college sports teams train and play on the sports courts and fields at this campus, which is also home to the Queen Mother Hospital for Animals, Bolton's Park Farm and the Buttery (a second union-run bar).

== Academic profile ==
=== Admissions ===
UCAS Admission Statistics
	2025	2024	2023	2022	2021
Applications (Note: Main scheme applications, International and UK)	2,715	2,775	2,785	3,165	3,015
Accepted	375	350	365	345	380
Applications/Accepted Ratio	7.2	7.9	7.6	9.2	7.9
Overall Offer Rate (%)	41.7	43.7	40.7	33.4	39.1
↳ UK only (%) (Note: UK domiciled applicants)	38.7	41.5	39.6	32.7	37.3
Average Entry Tariff	—N/a	—N/a	176	179	X
↳ Top three exams (Note: The maximum tariff score for three exams is 168: the equivalent of A*A*A* at A-Level, 777 at HL for the IB Diploma Programme, or AAA at Advanced Higher)	—N/a	—N/a	129.6	134.7	137.8

HESA Student Body Composition (2024/25)
Domicile and Ethnicity	Total
British White (Note: Not be confused solely with White British)	50%
British Ethnic Minorities (Note: Includes those who indicate that they identify as Asian, Black, Mixed Heritage, Arab or any other ethnicity except White.)	13%
International EU	3%
International Non-EU	35%

In the 2024/25 academic year, the student body consisted of 2,575 students, composed of 2,120 undergraduates and 455 postgraduate students. The university is generally designated as a 'high-tariff' institution by the Department for Education, with the average undergraduate entrant to the university in recent years amassing between 129 and 138 UCAS Tariff points in their top three pre-university qualifications – the equivalent of ABB to AAB at A-Level. Based on 2022/23 HESA entry standards data published in domestic league tables, which include a broad range of qualifications beyond the top three exam grades, the average student at RVC studying veterinary medicine achieved 179 points.

=== Courses ===
Rankings
Global rankings
- ARWU (2026): 901–1000
- THE (2026): 501–600

The college now provides a number of undergraduate courses, including the Bachelor of Veterinary Medicine (BVetMed) as well as accelerated graduate entry BVetMed and a combined BVetMed, Bachelor of Veterinary Science (BSc) degree. BSc degrees are also provided in veterinary nursing, bioveterinary sciences, biological sciences and veterinary pathology, and a foundation degree in veterinary nursing is also offered.

The college also offers the Gateway course; the first year of an extended six-year veterinary degree programme, created for students who are part of the UK Widening Participation cohort. It is designed to equip students with the knowledge, understanding and skills needed for a veterinary degree course. This is a widening participation programme for UK non-selective state school students whose parents have not been to university and who receive, or would have been eligible between 2004 and 2010 in England, to receive an Education Maintenance Allowance payment.

There is a distance learning department and the Graduate School provides masters courses, PhD studentships and clinical training scholarships in a wide range of disciplines. The college's Continuing Professional Development (CPD) Unit is a major academic provider of educational services to the veterinary community.

The RVC has an e-Media Unit which collaborates with other UK veterinary schools on the development of the WikiVet site.

=== Research ===
The Research Assessment Exercise in 2008 ranked the RVC as England's best veterinary school of those institutions whose research is exclusively veterinary related. 55% of their submitted academic staff were viewed as producing "world class" or "internationally excellent" research. It is a self-governing college within the University of London and its scientists work together in interdisciplinary teams within one research division.

The disciplines of Epidemiology, Microbiology, Pathology, Immunology and Clinical Science are drawn together in the Centre for Emerging, Endemic and Exotic Diseases (CEEED Centre), opened in 2008.

Animal Welfare and the Animal Welfare unit situated at the college are fundamental to the RVC's research mission and underpins their research programmes. The Structure and Motion Laboratory of the college also has facilities to study locomotion. Understanding how animals and people move is fundamental to musculoskeletal health and diseases that result from ageing, physical activity and the environment. The leaders of this Centre of Excellence are at the forefront of developing technologies to study animal movement, which are used in both basic and applied research.

The RVC has a Clinical Investigation Centre, co-ordinating disciplined study of its clinical caseload through its electronic patient record system and undertaking Phase II Clinical Trials under a Home Office license. They aim to translate research into solutions for veterinary and human medicine and use their expertise and veterinary patient caseload to undertake comparative research of both biomedical and veterinary significance.

== Clinical services ==
The RVC runs three animal hospitals and three first opinion practices, all based in London and Hertfordshire. The hospitals treat over 20,000 patients per year.

For small animals, the RVC runs the Beaumont Sainsbury Animal Hospital, a first-opinion hospital based at the RVC's Camden campus, and the Queen Mother Hospital for Animals, an animal referral hospital which provides clinical services in a wide range of specialities.

The equine services include the Equine Practice which is a first opinion ambulatory service, serving Hertfordshire and other local areas and the Equine Referral Hospital which provides referral clinical services to equine practices and horse owners throughout the south of England.

The RVC operates a referral farm animal hospital at its Hawkshead Campus, which provides full hospitalisation, diagnostic and surgical facilities for individual farm animals. The college has a collaboration with the Dairy Development centre, the Welsh Regional Veterinary Centre (WRVC), which provides a farm health investigation service to vets and farmers in the South Wales region.

== Student life ==
Students are encouraged to participate in extra-curricular activities both inside and outside of the college authority. The traditional sports of rowing, rugby, netball, hockey, and football are offered for both men and women; more unusually, students take part in sports such as shooting, ice-skating, and polo. For purpose of sports, the RVC is a part of the United Hospitals, and the sports clubs compete (and sometimes socialise) with the London medical schools (such as Barts, ICSM, and RUMS).

There are also a number of academically inclined clubs, such as the Farm Animal Clinical Club, the Student Equine Veterinary Association, and the Zoological Society. Non-academic societies include the Music Society, performing arts, games society, and the International Veterinary Students' Association (IVSA).

The Students' Union runs a number of events throughout the year. In the past, these have included a May Ball, Christmas Ball and Sports Ball, as well as a Halfway Dinner (which takes place in the second term of third year for students on the BVetMed course), Burns Night, an elaborate Freshers' Week and Raising and Giving (RAG) Fortnight. The union itself is steadily growing and includes representatives of the Association of Veterinary Students and IVSA; based out of Hawkshead House on the Hawkshead Campus, it provides social and academic opportunities for students of all cohorts and courses. A 'Camden vs. Hawkshead' competition, traditionally taking place between pre-clinical and clinical students, is traditionally held in spring each year. Since 2018, a 'varsity' weekend has also taken place between the RVC and the veterinary school at the University of Surrey; the inaugural event was hosted at Surrey but won by the RVC.

Students on the BVetMed course are invited to attend events organised by the Association of Veterinary Students (AVS) such as Sports Weekend (where the schools compete against each other in unisex football, rugby, netball, and other games) and the annual academic Congress. These allow veterinary students from the UK veterinary schools and the University College Dublin veterinary faculty to convene once or twice a year to socialise, network and compete. Sports Weekend was last held at the RVC in 2016, and Congress in 2019.

RVC students are also invited to participate in societies run by other universities in London; the University of London Union offers a selection of sports and societies, as does the Imperial College School of Medicine Students' Union, and students tend to take advantage of these opportunities as well as being involved in RVC societies.

== Alumni ==
- Mary Brancker (1914–2010). The first woman to become president of the British Veterinary Association, after whom Mary Brancker House was named.
- Walter Plowright (1923–2010), whose work led directly to the worldwide eradication of the viral disease rinderpest in 2001.
- Sir Gordon Shattock (1928–2010)
- Dr Rory Cowlam (2010–2015)
- Liz Bonnin, Science broadcaster
- Clare Bryant, Professor of Veterinary Science

== See also ==
- Armorial of UK universities
- List of universities in the UK
- United Hospitals
- United Hospitals Boat Club
