= King's College London GKT School of Medical Education =

Public medical school in London, England

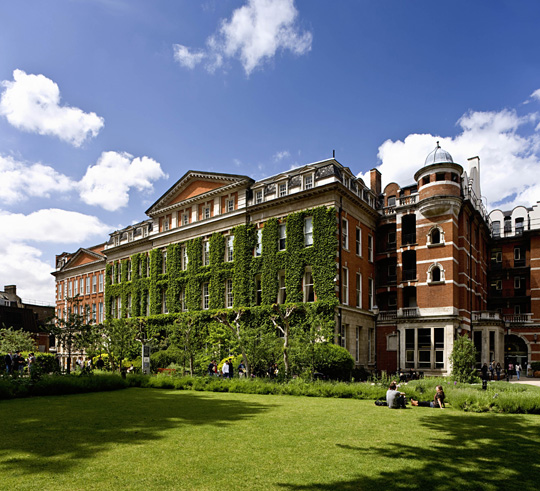
- Motto: Latin: Dare Quam Accipere
- Type: Medical school
- Established: 1173 (St Thomas's hospital as 'teaching hospital'); 1550 (St Thomas's Hospital Medical School); 1721 (Guy's Hospital); 1909 (King's College Hospital Medical School); 1982 (United Medical and Dental Schools of Guy's and St Thomas' Hospitals); 1998 (Guy's, King's and St Thomas' School of Medicine); 2005 (King's College London School of Medicine); 2015 (King's College London GKT School of Medical Education)
- Parent institution: King's College London
- Affiliations: United Hospitals
- Dean: Professor James Galloway
- Faculty: 315
- Administrative staff: 450
- Students: 2200
- Location: London, England
- Campus: Guy's Campus
Colours
Navy blue, Gold, Purple, White, Red
- Website: www.kcl.ac.uk/lsm/medicine
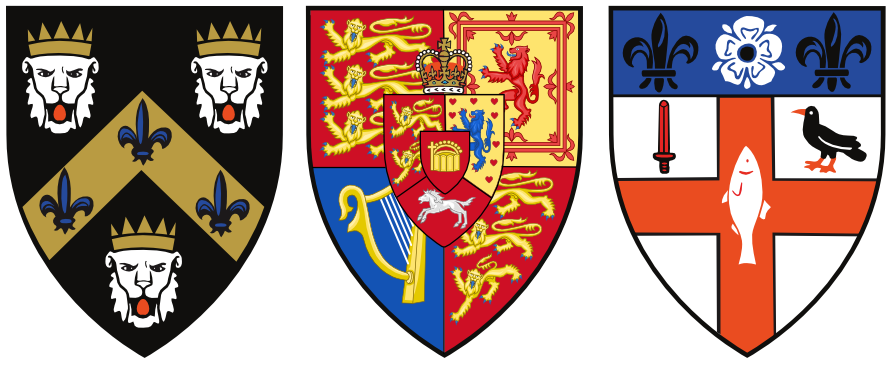

King's College London GKT School of Medical Education (simply referred to as GKT) is the medical school of King's College London. The school has campuses at three institutions, Guy's Hospital (Southwark), King's College Hospital (Denmark Hill) and St Thomas' Hospital (Lambeth) in London – with initial of each hospital making up the acronymous name of the school. The school in its current guise was formed following a merger with the United Medical and Dental Schools of Guy's and St Thomas' Hospitals on 1 August 1998.

The medical school has an annual intake of around 400 places on the standard MBBS Programme, 50 places on the Extended Medical Degree Programme (EMDP) and 23 places on the Graduate/Professional Entry Programme (GPEP), and an additional 2 places on the GPEP course for Maxillofacial (MaxFax) Entry. The intake numbers vary year to year. It receives more applications for medicine than any other UK medical school and as of 2024 applicants were required to sit the University Clinical Aptitude Test.

The medical school is also home to the world's oldest hospital gazette, originally published in 1872 as the Guy's Hospital Gazette, which continues to run under the name GKT Gazette.

== Name ==
The school was named the "GKT School of Medicine" between 1998 and 2005. However, due to confusion over the official name of the institute, especially with regards to research emerging from the university, it was rebranded as the "King's College London School of Medicine and Dentistry at Guy's, King's College and St Thomas' Hospitals".

In 2015, to reflect the strong history of the multiple institutions that comprise the medical school, the school once again rebranded as the "King's College London GKT School of Medical Education".

== History ==
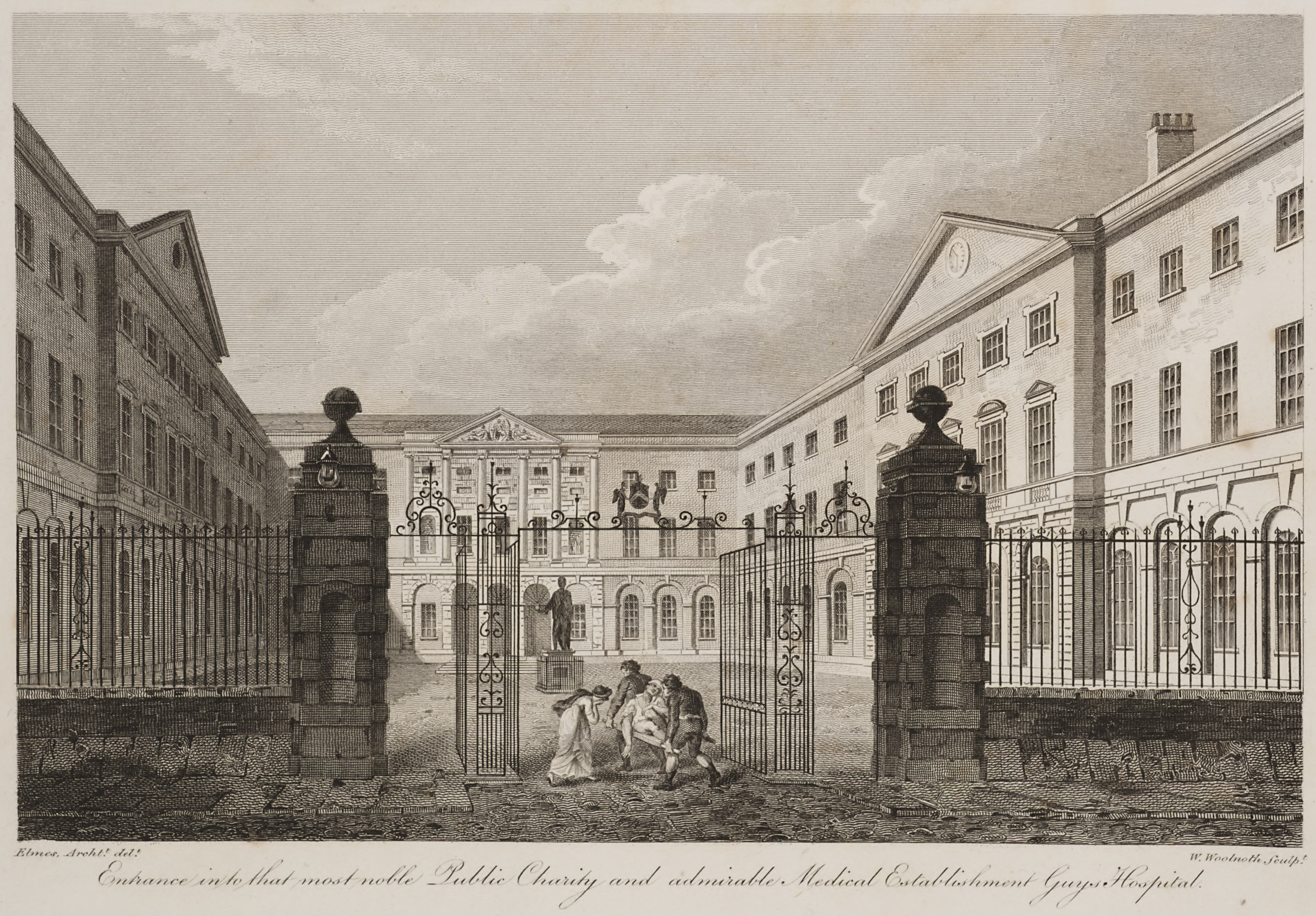
1820 engraving of Guy's campus entrance by James Elmes and William Woolnoth

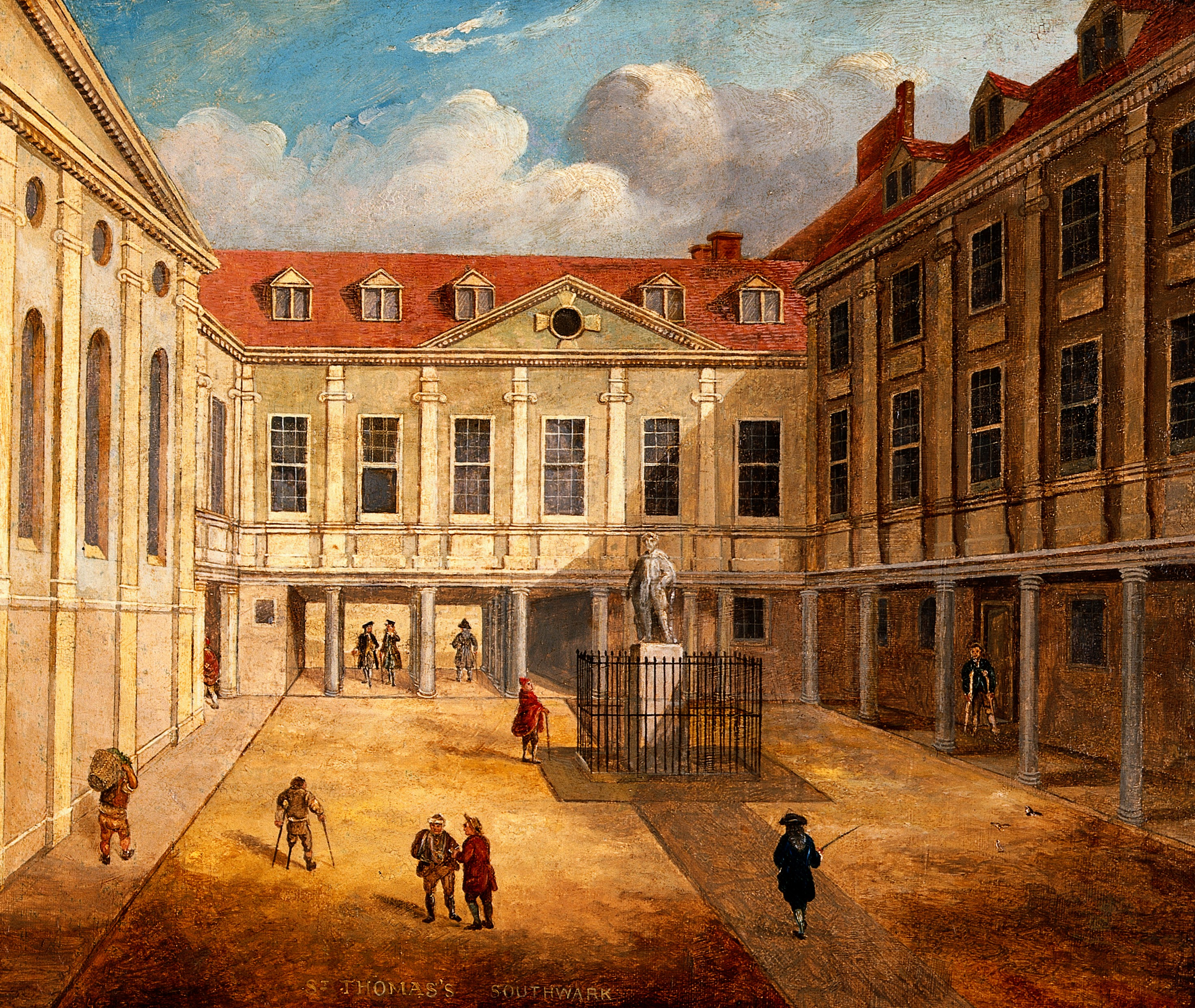
A renaissance oil painting of St Thomas' Hospital, where the St Thomas's Hospital Medical School was founded

The hospitals associated with King's College London GKT School of Medical Education, i.e., Guy's Hospital, King's College Hospital and St Thomas' Hospital (hence the GKT name and abbreviation), are: "amongst the oldest hospitals in the world, having endured the Black Death, the plague, the War of the Roses, the Great Fire of London, the Blitz and over 60 years of NHS reforms."

Of the GKT School of Medical Education teaching hospitals, St Thomas' Hospital is the oldest and was founded in 1173 but whose roots can be traced to the establishment of St Mary Overie Priory in 1106. Thomas Guy, a governor of St Thomas', founded Guy's Hospital in 1721 as a place to treat 'incurables' discharged from St Thomas'.

St Thomas's Hospital Medical School was founded in 1550 and was sited across St Thomas' Hospital and Guy's Hospital. In 1769 it was decided that Guy's would teach mainly medical subjects, whereas St Thomas' would focus on surgery and the joint teaching institution was generally known as The Borough Hospitals. However, a dispute between the two hospitals regarding the successor to Sir Astley Cooper resulted in Guy's Hospital establishing its own medical school in 1825. After this, students of surgeons attended operations at both hospitals until 1836. A riot between students of the two hospitals broke out in the operating theatre at St. Thomas's in 1836 which ended the arrangement. St Thomas's Hospital Medical School and Guy's Hospital Medical School were two of the oldest and most prestigious medical schools in the UK.

In 1982, the two medical schools merged to form the United Medical and Dental Schools of Guy's and St Thomas' Hospitals, more commonly known as UMDS. It was enlarged in 1983 when the Royal Dental Hospital of London School of Dental Surgery merged with Guy's Hospital Dental School, and again in 1985 with the addition of the Postgraduate Institute of Dermatology.

Initially, students of UMDS were allocated to one of the two campuses, with most preclinical teaching and all clinical teaching being separate. With the intake of 1989, students ceased being allocated in this way, and teaching for all students was divided between the campuses and their peripheral hospitals.

Discussions between King's College London (which had trained medical students since its establishment and founding of its own hospital, King's College Hospital, in 1840) and UMDS regarding a further merger began in 1992. UMDS was subsequently absorbed into King's College London on 1 August 1998, forming the Guy's, King's and St Thomas' School of Medicine, more commonly known as GKT. In 2005, the entity was rebranded as the King's College London School of Medicine and Dentistry at Guy's, King's College and St Thomas' Hospitals (KCLMS). However, it is still widely known as GKT amongst current students, graduates, and consultants who consider themselves affiliated to the hospitals rather than the university.

In 2005, the dental school became the Dental Institute and the remainder was renamed the King's College School of Medicine.

Before the start of the 2010/11 academic year, Physiotherapy became a part of the School of Medicine, having previously been run by the School of Biomedical and Health Sciences.

== Hospitals ==
King's College London GKT School of Medical Education is associated with the following hospitals:

- Guy's Hospital
- St Thomas' Hospital
- King's College Hospital
- Maudsley Hospital
- University Hospital Lewisham
- Bethlem Royal Hospital
- Evelina London Children's Hospital

It is also associated with several peripheral hospitals around the South East of the UK, including Medway Maritime Hospital, William Harvey Hospital and Queen Elizabeth The Queen Mother Hospital. Students are required to spend at least part of their training at these peripheral locations.

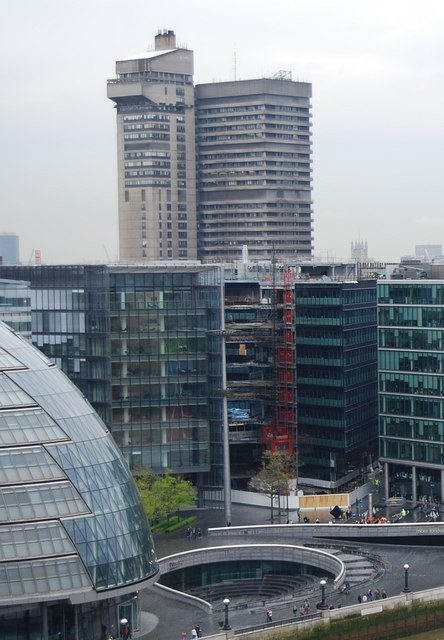
Guy's Hospital

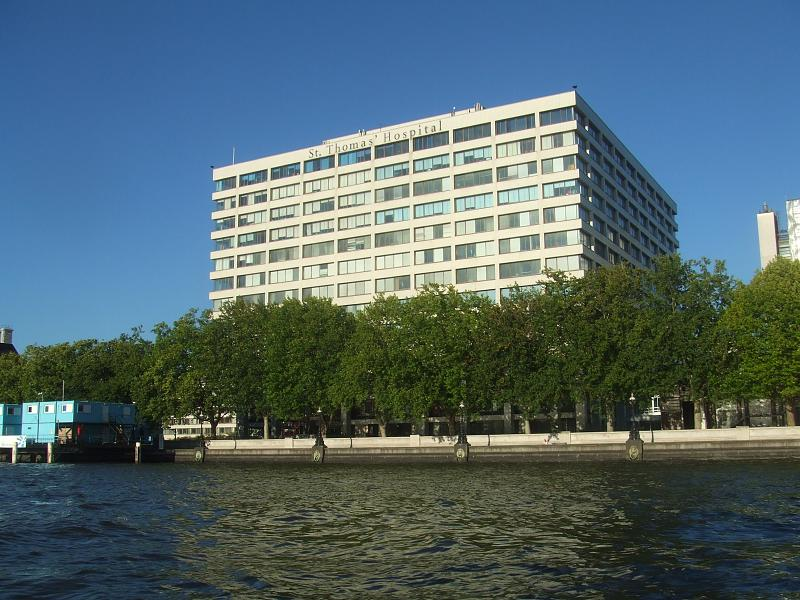
St Thomas' Hospital

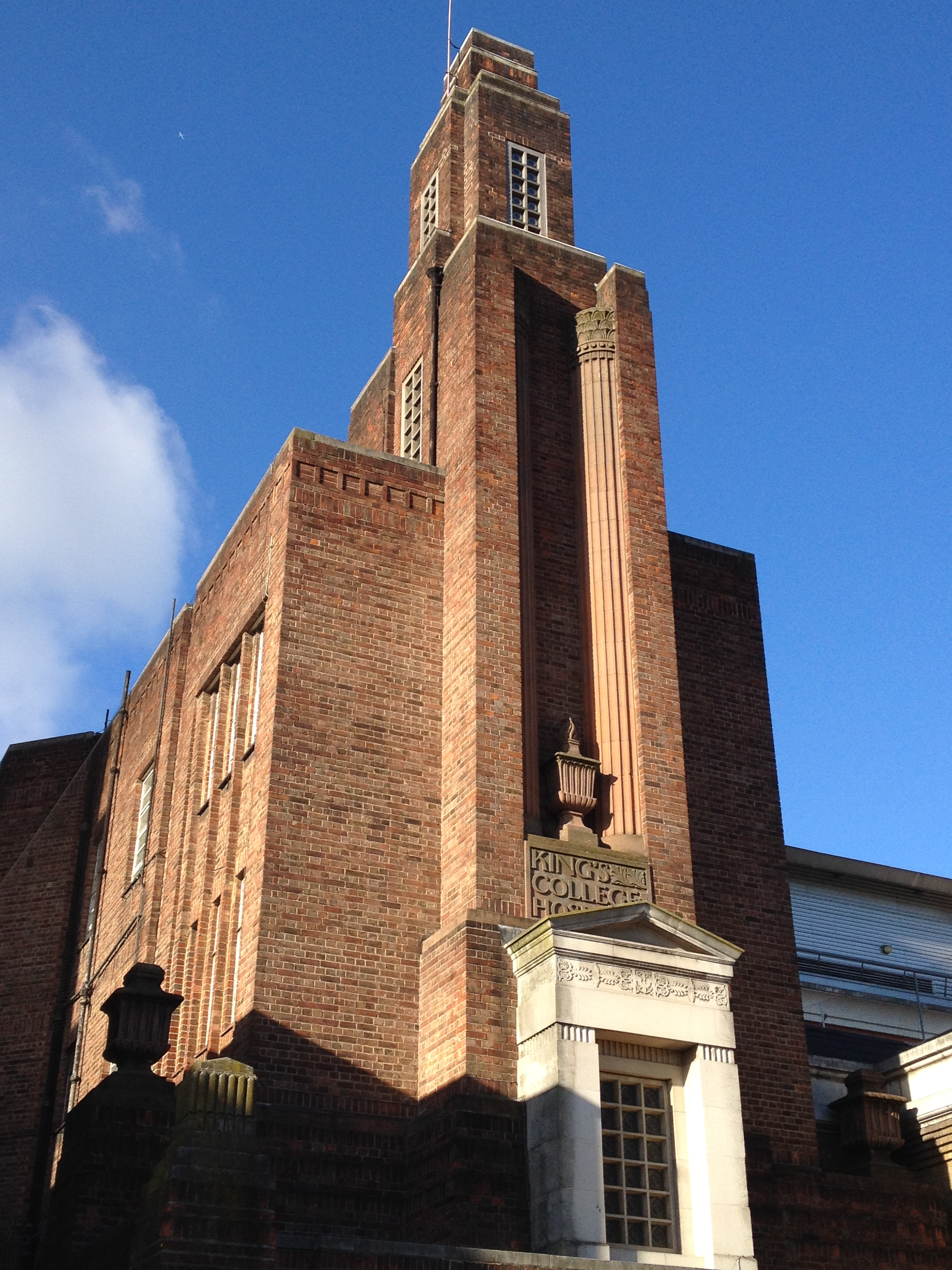
King's College Hospital

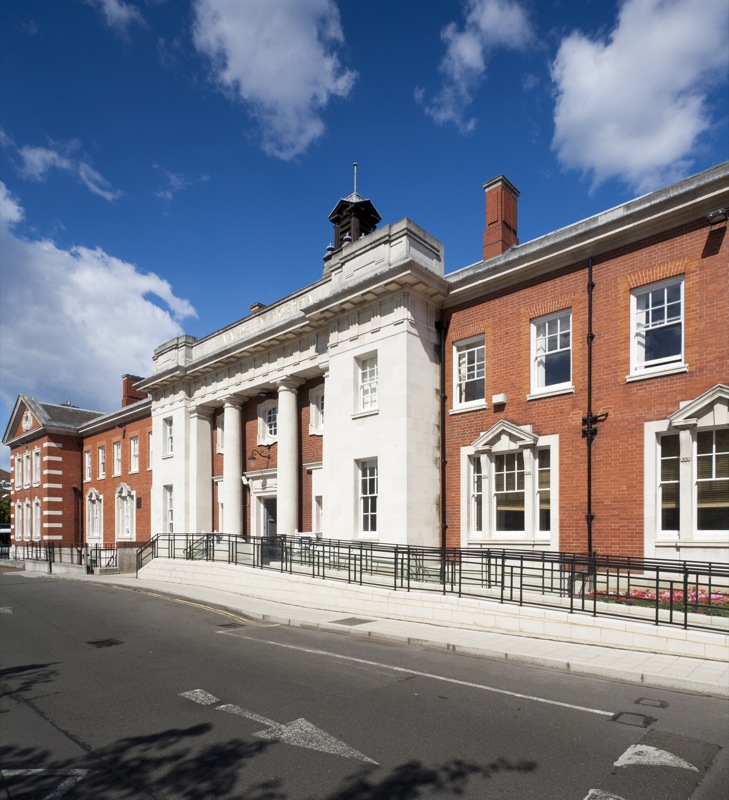
Maudsley Hospital

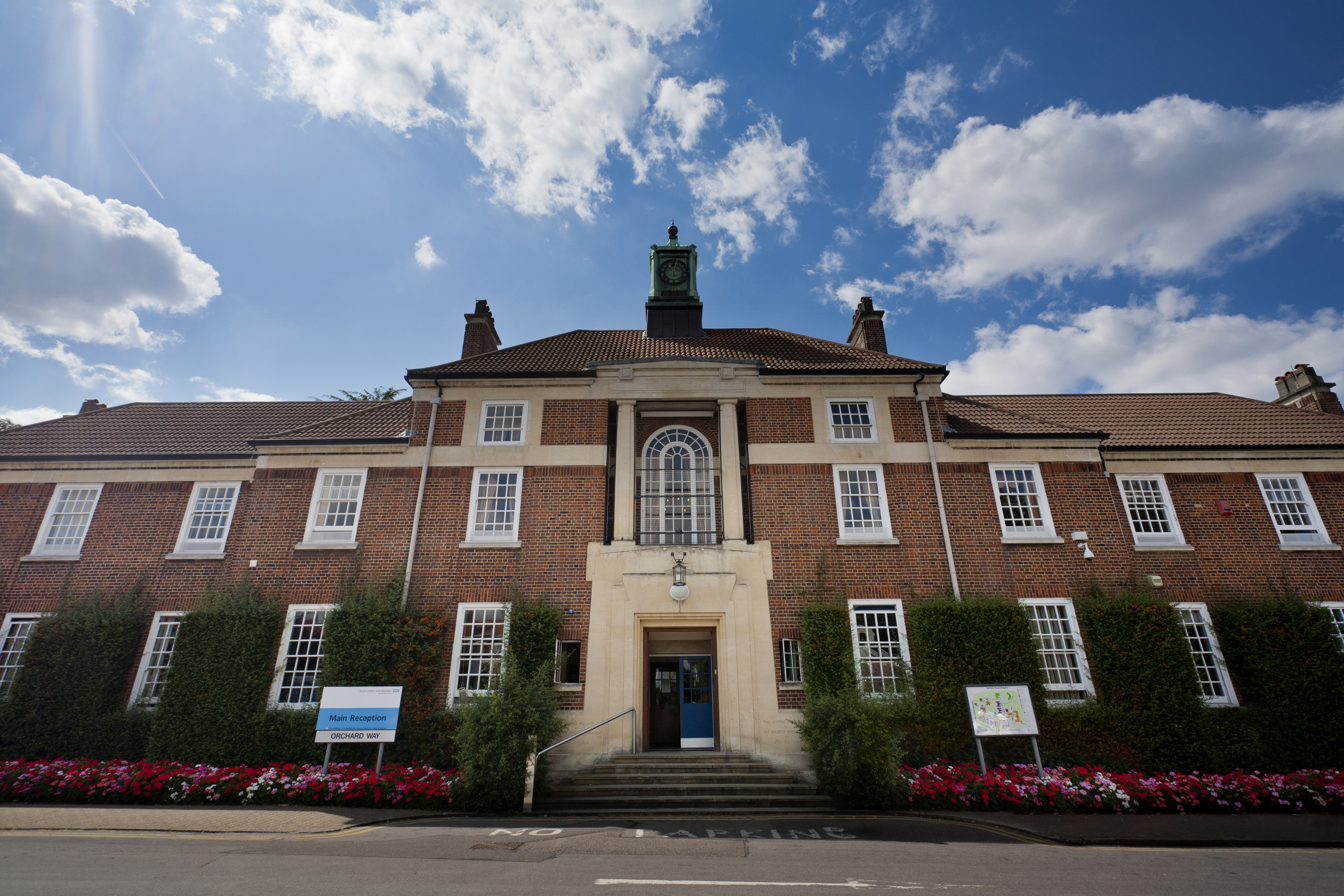
Bethlem Royal Hospital

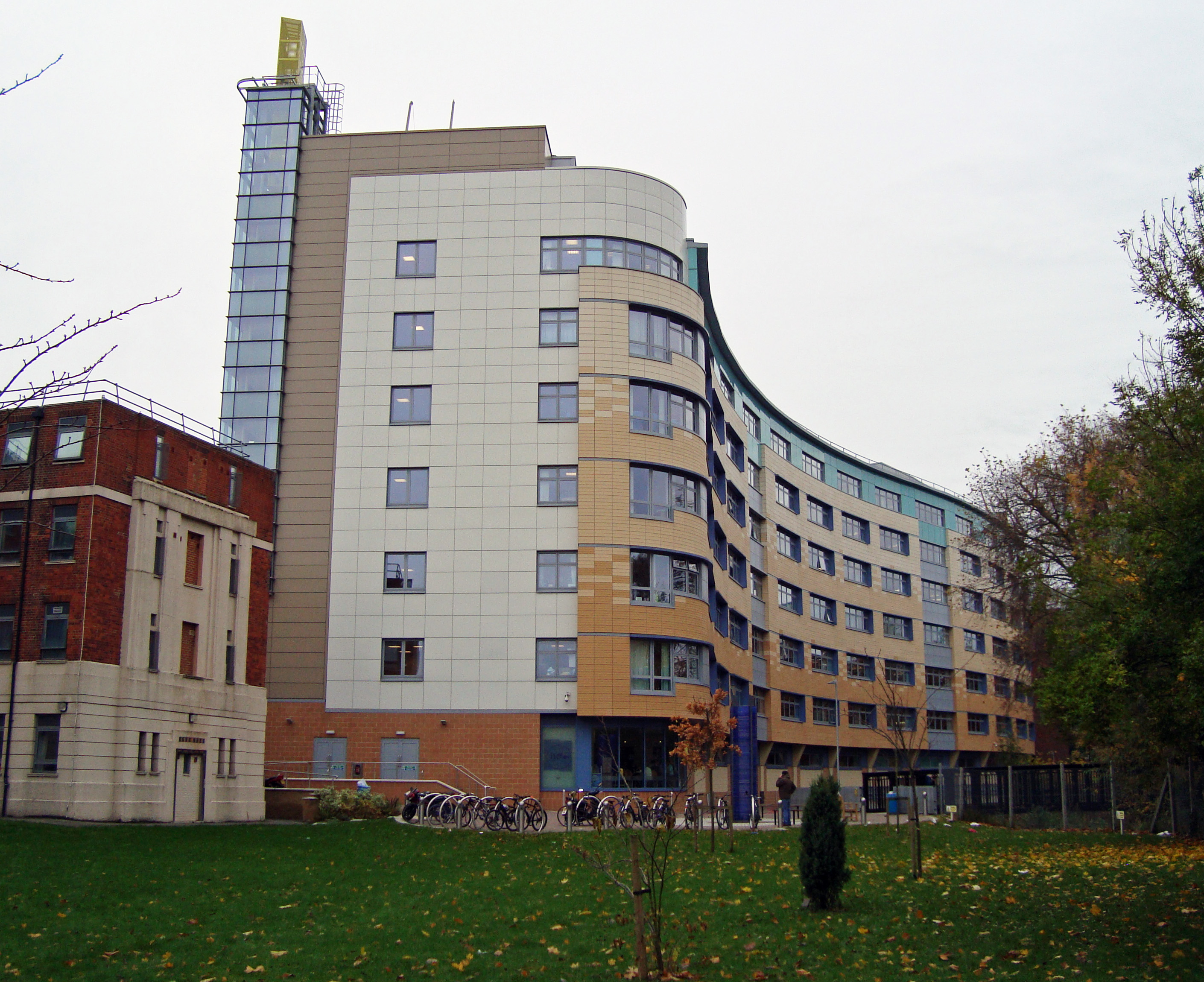
University Hospital Lewisham

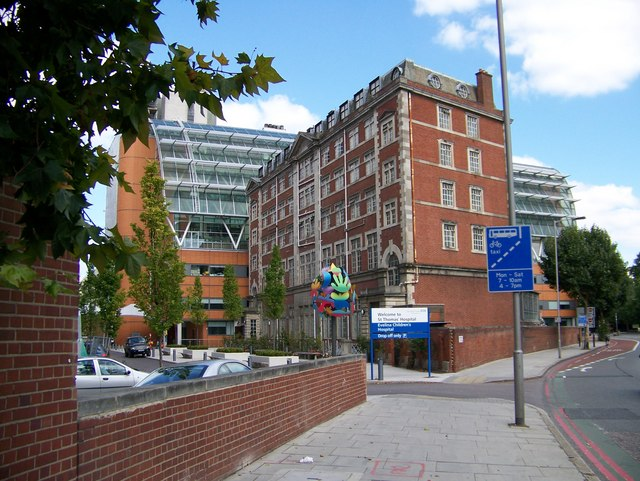
Evelina Children's Hospital

== Campuses ==
=== Guy's Campus ===
Guy's Campus is situated close to London Bridge and the Shard on the South Bank of the River Thames. It holds New Hunt's House Library and building, Hodgkin Building and Wills' Library, Henriette Raphael House and Guy's Hospital.

The nearest Underground station is London Bridge.

=== St Thomas' Campus ===
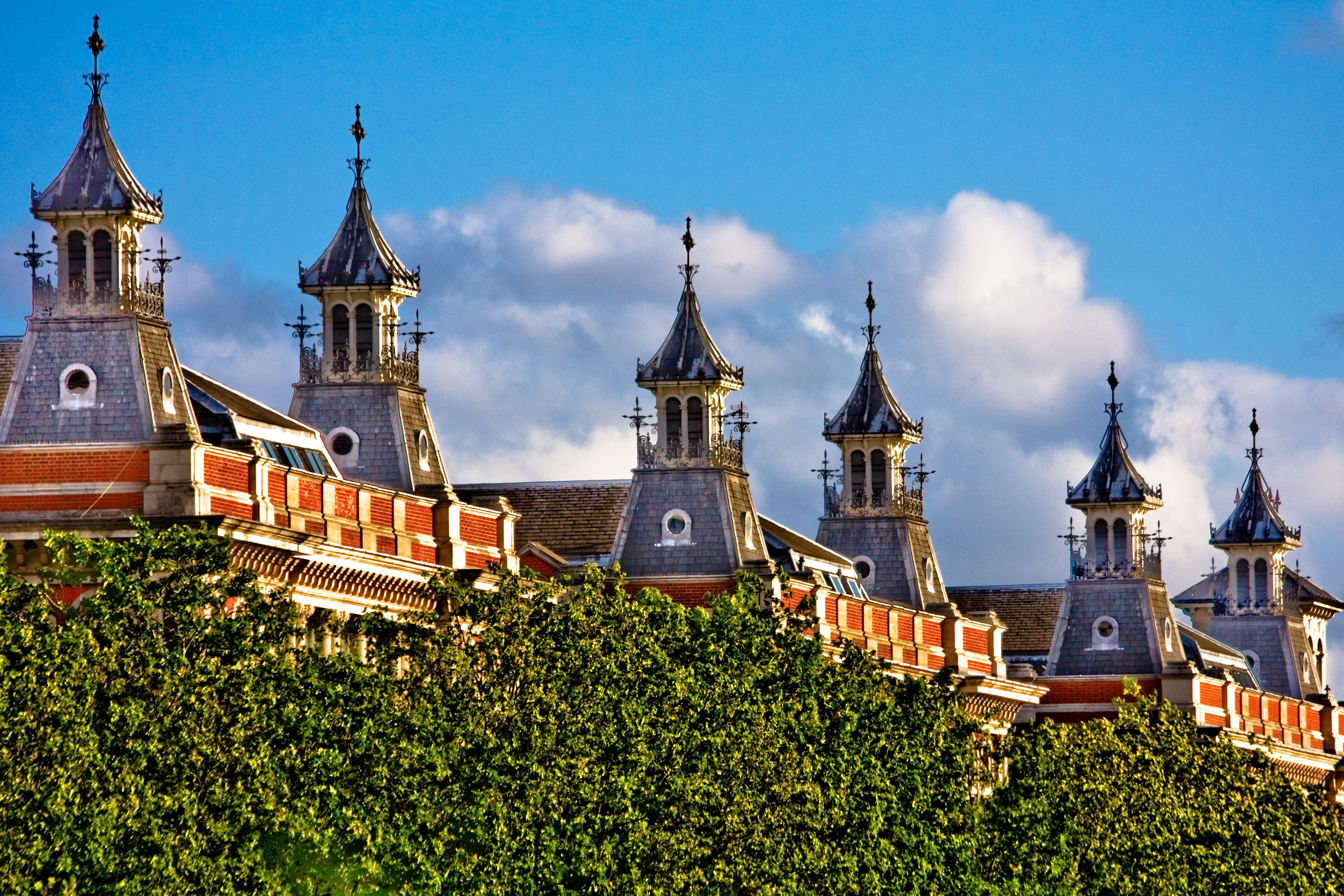
The surviving pavilions (since 1868) at St Thomas' campus

The St Thomas' Campus in the London Borough of Lambeth, facing the Houses of Parliament across the Thames, houses parts of the School of Medicine and the Dental Institute. The Florence Nightingale Museum is also located here. The museum is dedicated to Florence Nightingale, the founder of the Nightingale Training School of St Thomas' Hospital (now King's Florence Nightingale Faculty of Nursing and Midwifery). St Thomas' Hospital became part of King's College London School of Medicine in 1998. The St Thomas' Hospital and Campus were named after St Thomas Becket. The Department of Twin Research (TwinsUk), King's College London is located in St. Thomas' Hospital.

The nearest Underground station is Westminster.

=== Denmark Hill Campus ===
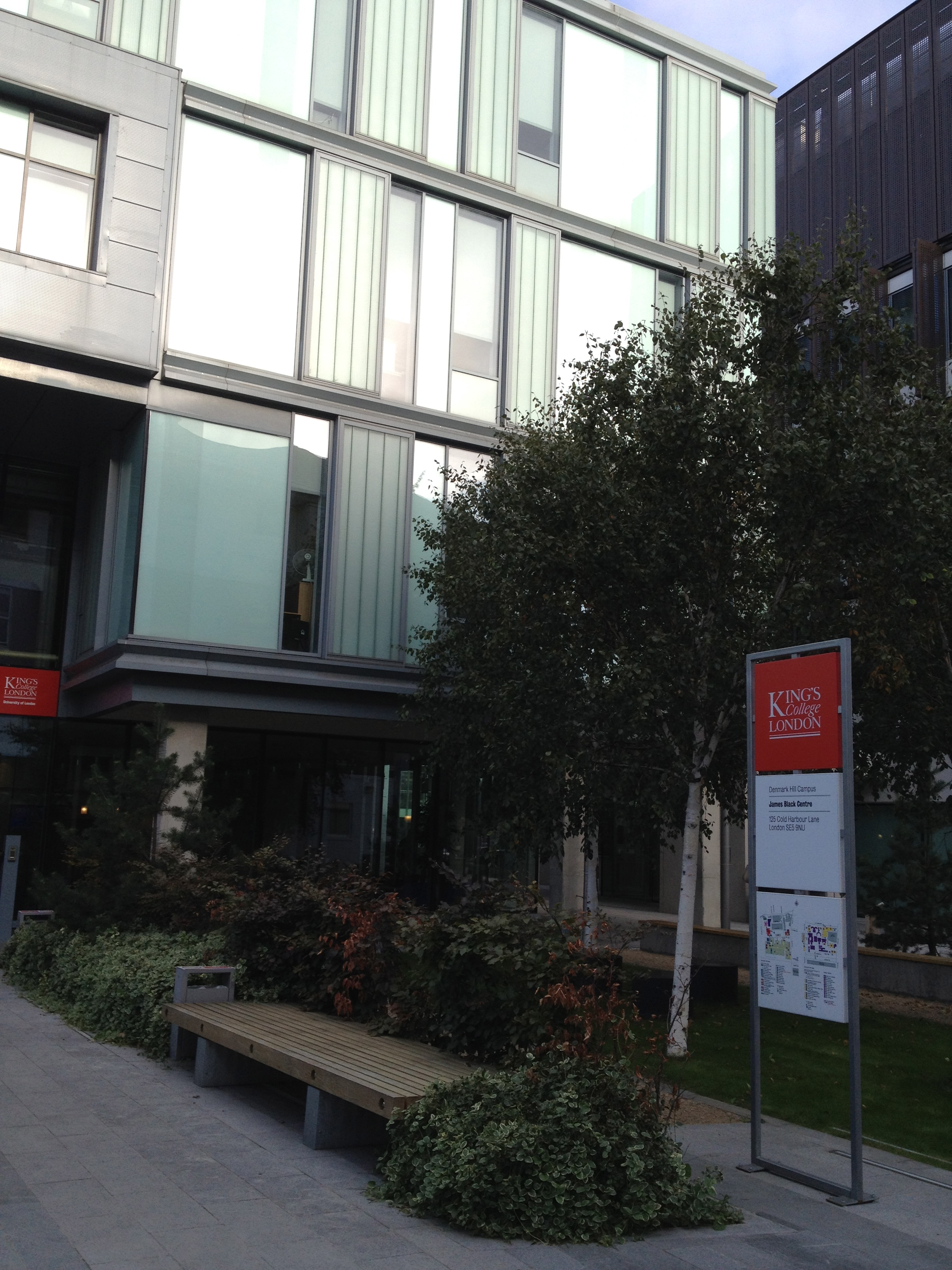
The James Black Centre (Cardiovascular Division)

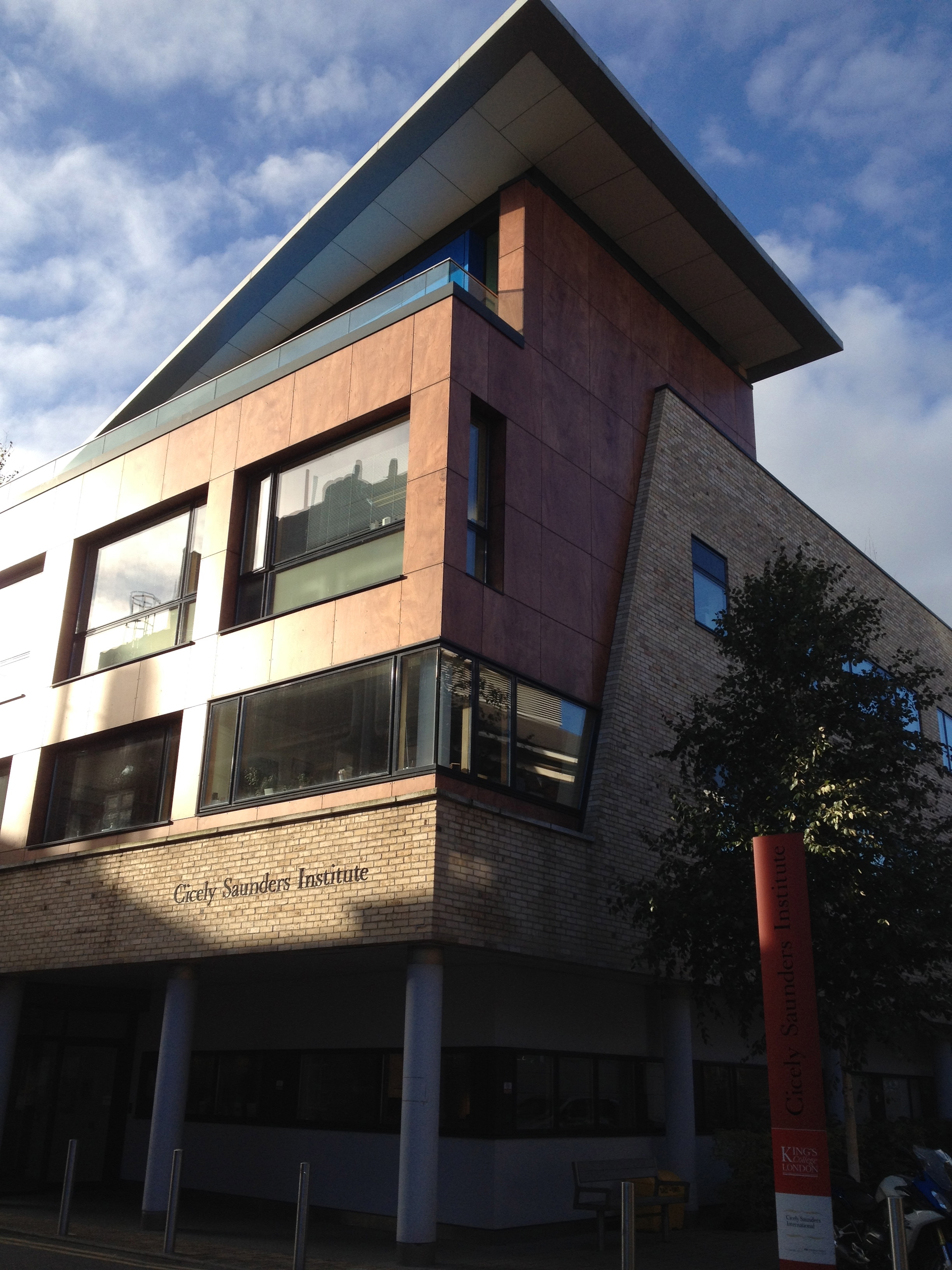
The Cicely Saunders Institute (Palliative Care, Policy & Rehabilitation)

Denmark Hill Campus is situated in south London near the borders of the London Borough of Lambeth and the London Borough of Southwark in Camberwell and is the only campus not situated on the River Thames. The campus consists of King's College Hospital, the Maudsley Hospital and the Institute of Psychiatry, Psychology and Neuroscience (IoPPN). In addition to the Institute of Psychiatry, Psychology and Neuroscience, parts of the Dental Institute and School of Medicine, and a large hall of residence, King's College Hall, are situated here. Other buildings include the campus library known as the Weston Education Centre (WEC), the James Black Centre, the Rayne Institute (haemato-oncology) and the Cicely Saunders Institute (palliative care), the world's first purpose-built institute for palliative care

The Maurice Wohl Clinical Neuroscience Institute was opened by the Princess Royal in 2015 at the Denmark Hill Campus. It is named after British philanthropist Maurice Wohl, who had a long association with King's and supported many medical projects.

The nearest Overground station is Denmark Hill.

== Admissions ==
King's College London, generally in 2005, is the sixth-most difficult UK university to gain admission to, as ranked as Sunday Times. A freedom-of-information request in 2015 revealed that for every 1,764 applications that School of Medical Education received, only 39 offers were made thereby resulting in an offer rate of just 2.2%. For other subjects: Nursery & Midwifery, Physiotherapy and Clinical Dentistry also had one of the lowest offer rates of 14%, 16% and 17%, respectively.

== Graduation ==
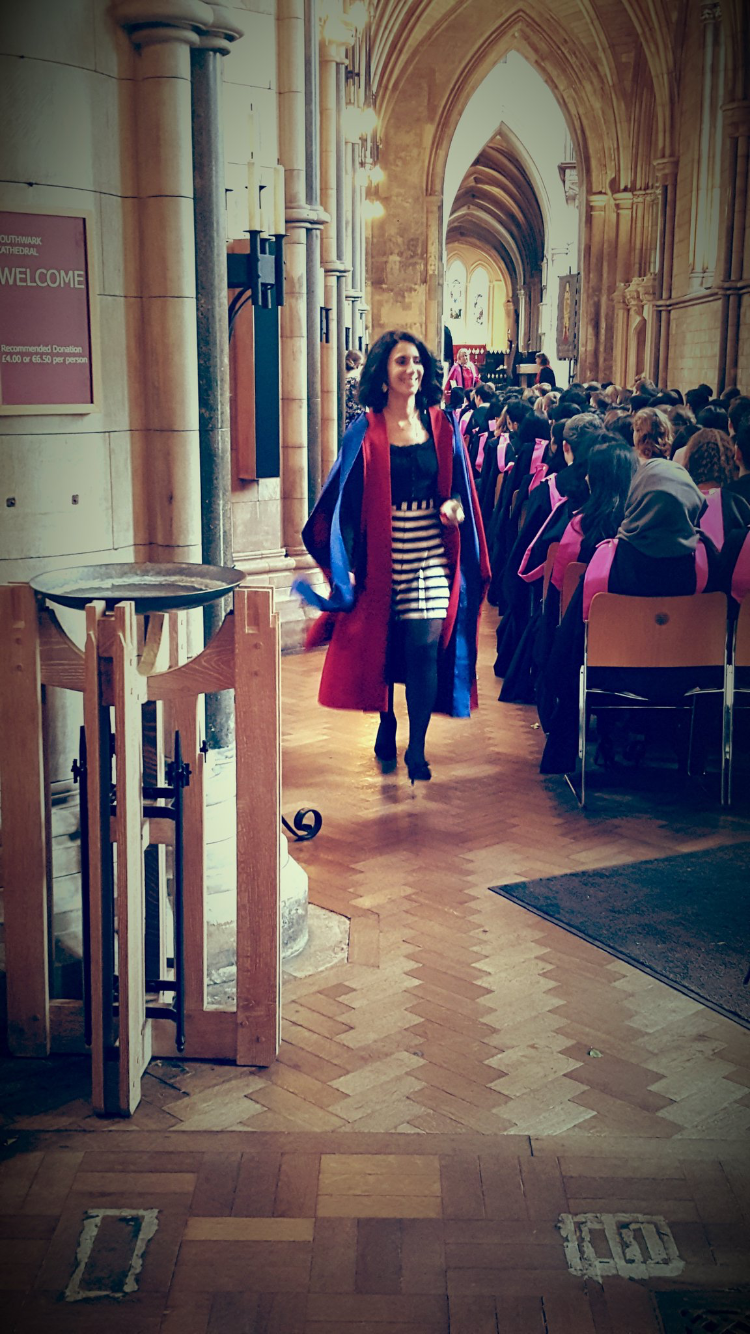
Owing to St Thomas's Medical School roots traced to St Mary Overie Priory, medical students' graduation are held at Southwark Cathedral

Also see Graduation Dress of King's College London

Graduation ceremonies for School of Medical Education are normally held in June or July (summer). During summer graduation, the graduation ceremonies are held in Southwark Cathedral; this is owing to St Thomas's Medical School roots that could be traced to St Mary Overie Priory. For those who happen to finish during January (winter), graduands could opt for attending the graduation ceremonies held in the Barbican Centre.

== Research ==
The school's research excellence is recognised worldwide and the 2008 Research Assessment Exercise confirmed King's as one of the top two universities in the UK for health research strength. Around 70 per cent of health science submissions from King's were ranked in the top six within the UK. The school has been part of King's Health Partners since 2009, one of the first five academic health science centres established in the UK.

Currently, the School hosts six MRC Centres,

- MRC-Asthma UK Centre in Allergic Mechanisms of Asthma
- MRC Centre for Developmental Neurobiology
- MRC Centre for Neurodegenerative Research
- MRC Centre for Social Genetic and Developmental Psychiatry
- MRC Centre for Transplantation
- MRC-HPA Centre for Environment and Health (awarded in 2009 in collaboration with Imperial College London)
- MRC National Institute for Medical Research (MRC NIMR) including the MRC Biomedical NMR Centre (planned to move to the new Francis Crick Institute in 2015, a partnership between the MRC, Cancer Research UK, Imperial College London, King's College London, the Wellcome Trust and University College London)

The two MRC Centres in Transplantation and the Allergic Mechanisms of Asthma in 2008 alone were awarded 'Centre of Excellence' status by the British Heart Foundation with funding of £9 million and a £4 million Breakthrough Breast Cancer Unit was opened in 2009.

The School is also host to its own 'Centre of Medical Law and Ethics', the first of its kind in the UK.

== Sports teams ==
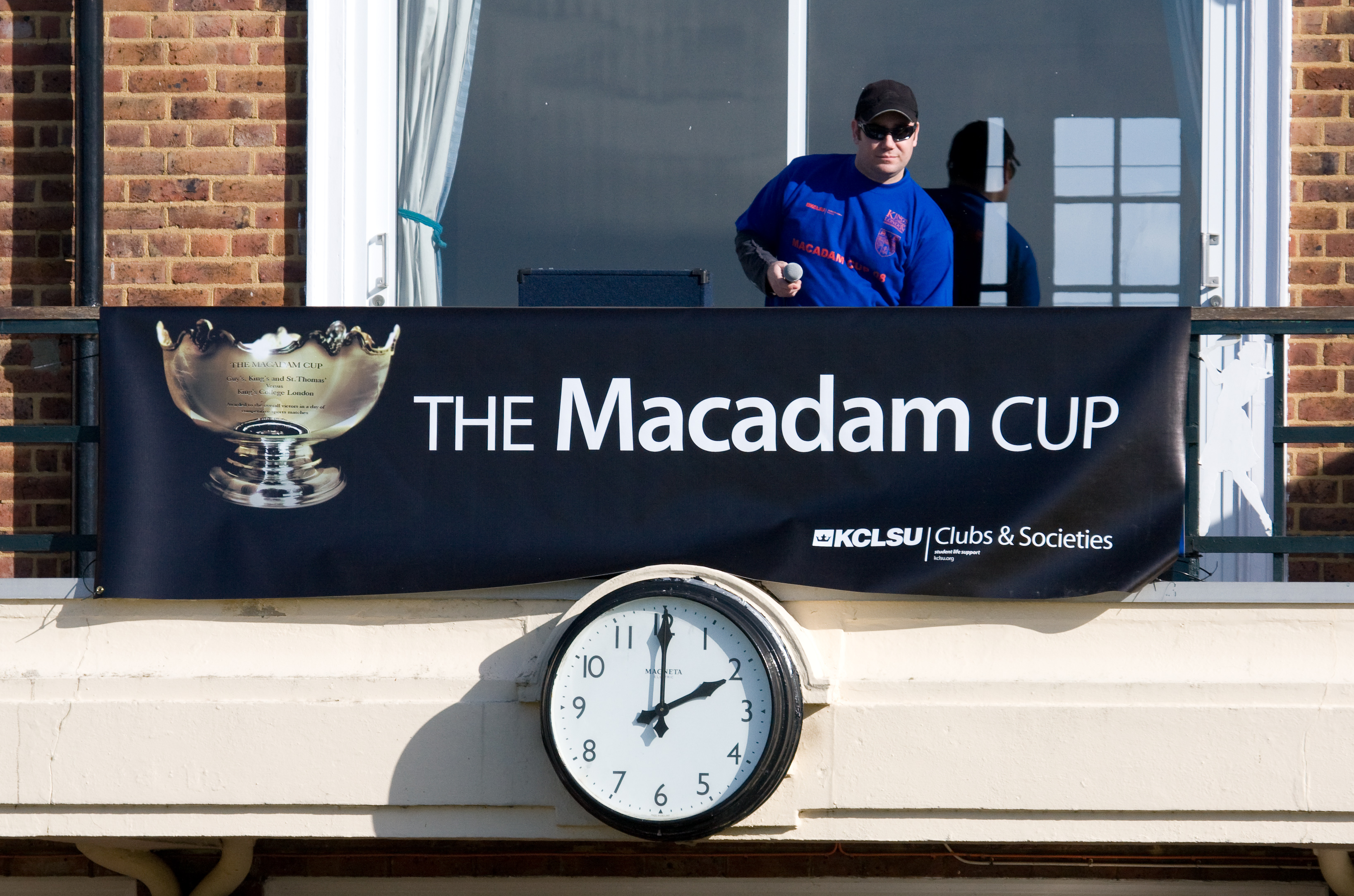
Macadam Cup: A GKT and KCL tradition for the past years

Like other medical schools in the UK, GKT has its own sports teams which compete in various student sports leagues and tournaments.

Like most other universities in London, GKT sports teams take part in the BUCS leagues and cups and the University of London Union leagues and cups. The GKT teams also take part in the United Hospitals Cup, which is a sporting competition played between the medical, dental and veterinary schools of London in all sports. The two most popular and biggest of the competitions include the United Hospitals Bumps (rowing) and the men's rugby.

GKT has a fierce sporting rivalry with King's College London. This rivalry led to the founding of the Macadam Cup in 2004, which pits GKT and KCL sports teams against each other. The championship is named in honour of Sir Ivison Macadam, an alumnus of King's. So far in Macadam Cup's history, the GKT Team has the most wins.

== Notable people ==
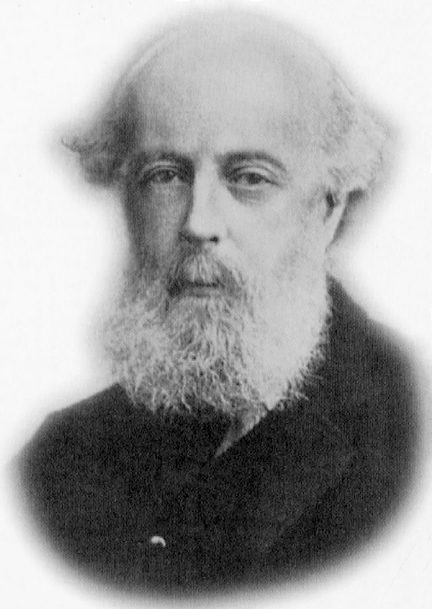
Thomas Armitage

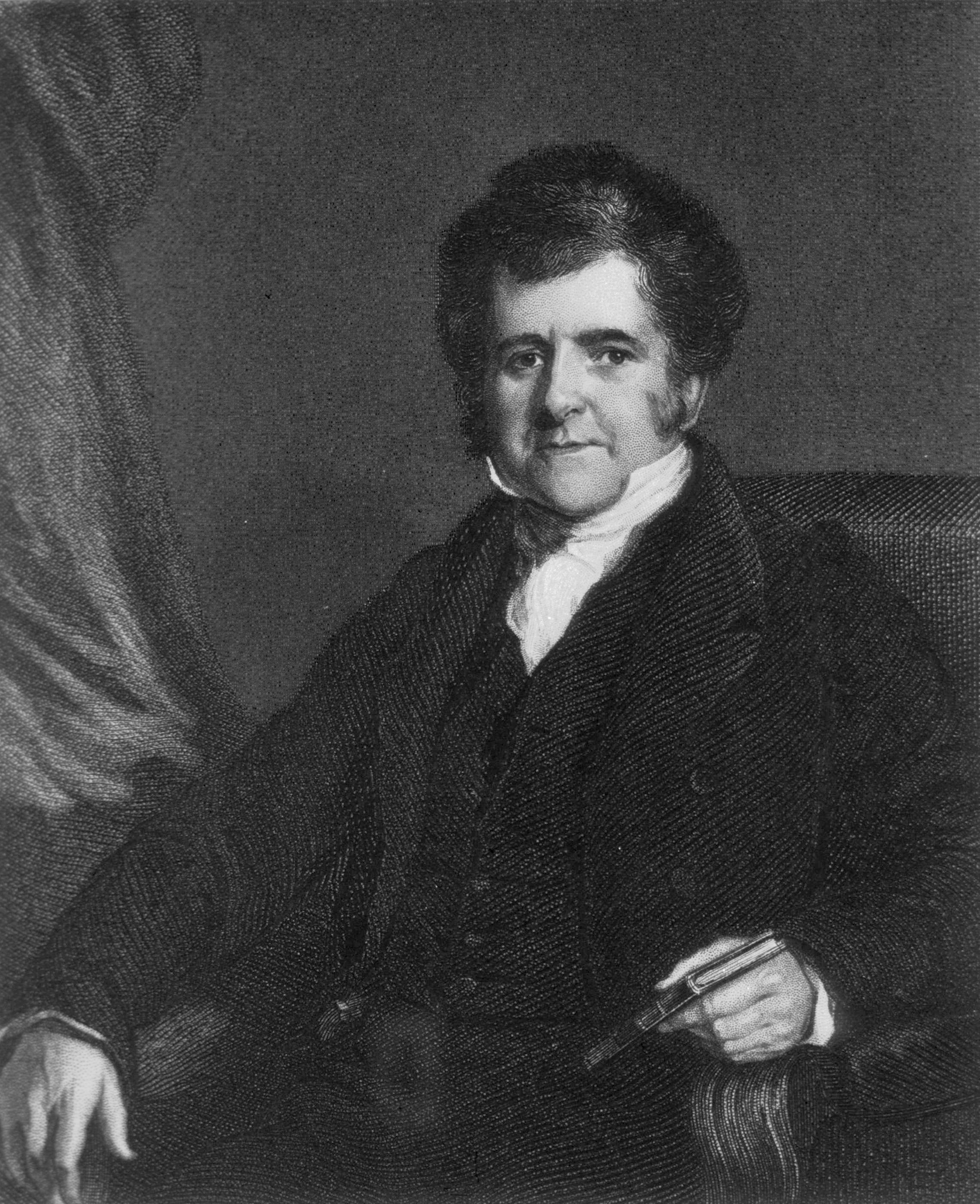
Richard Bright

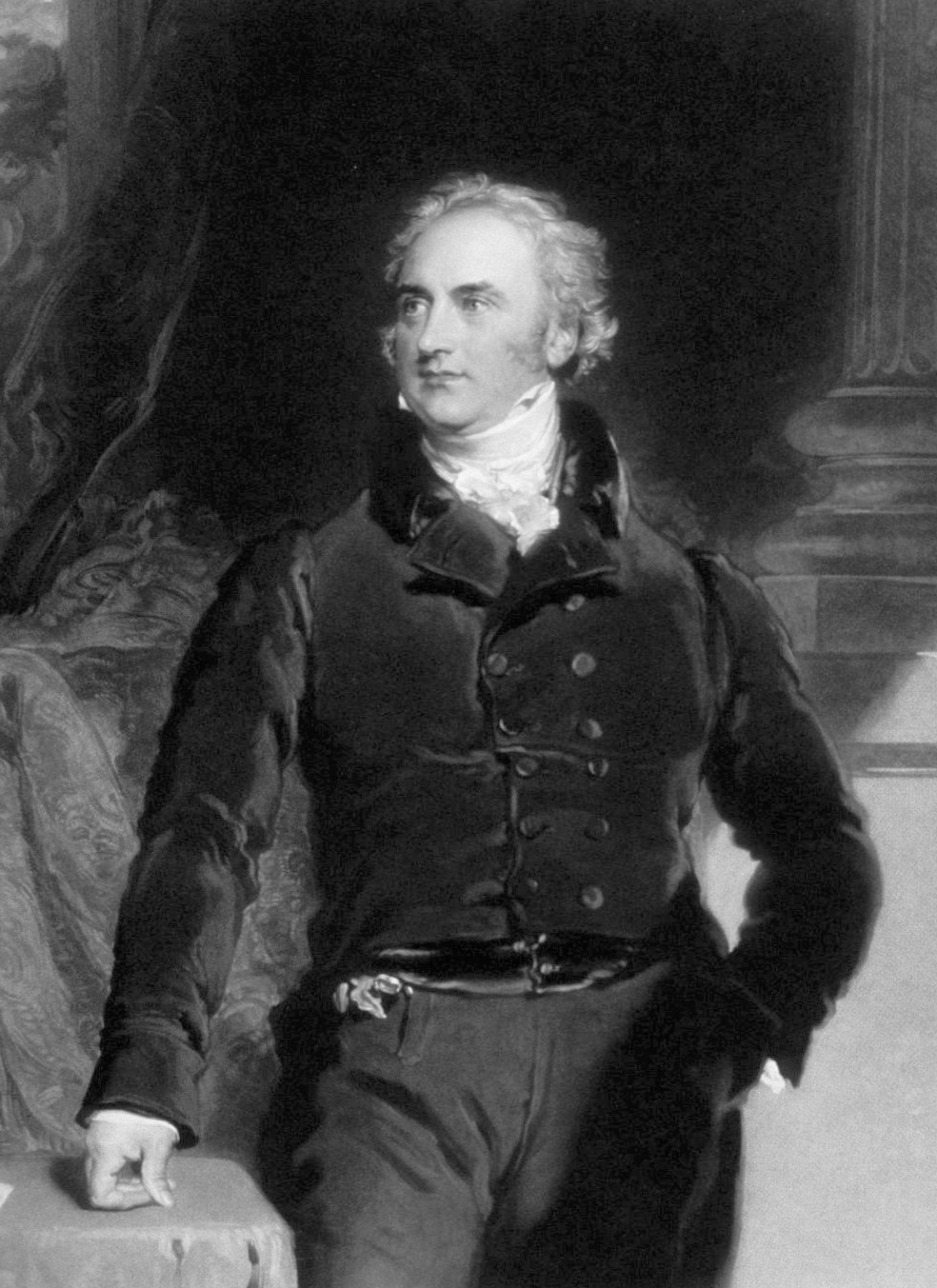
Astley Cooper

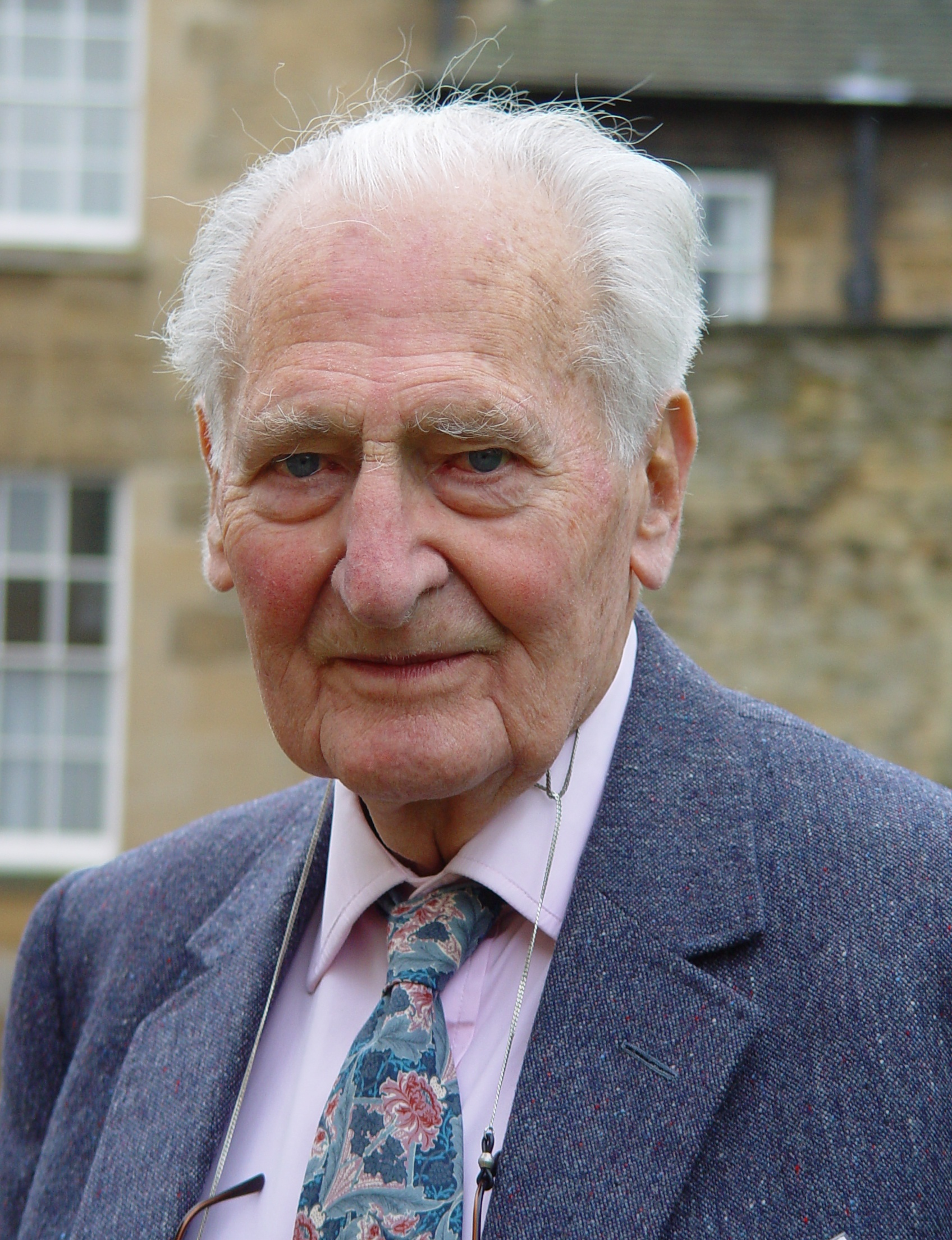
Richard Doll

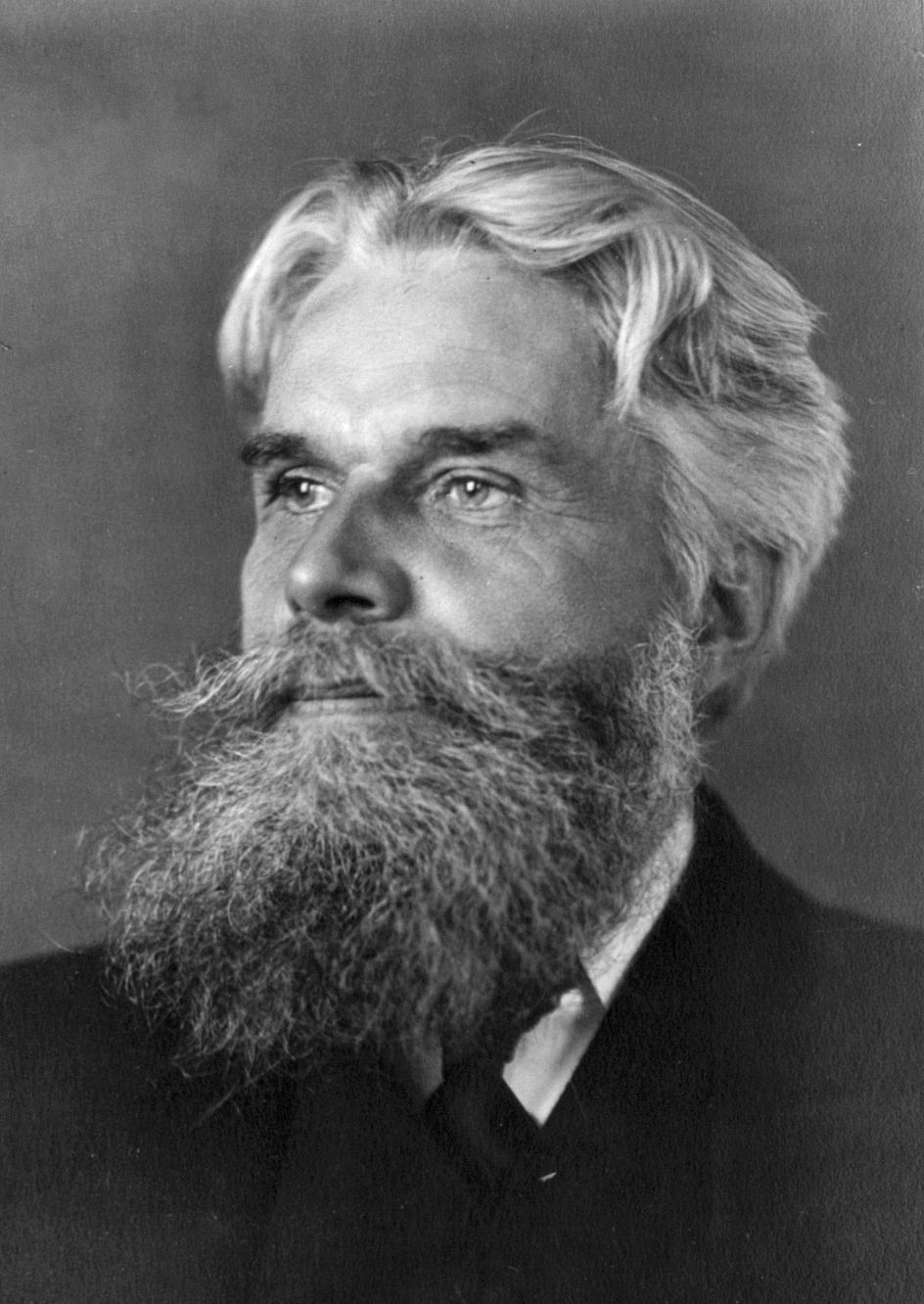
Havelock Ellis

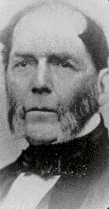
Abraham Pineo Gesner

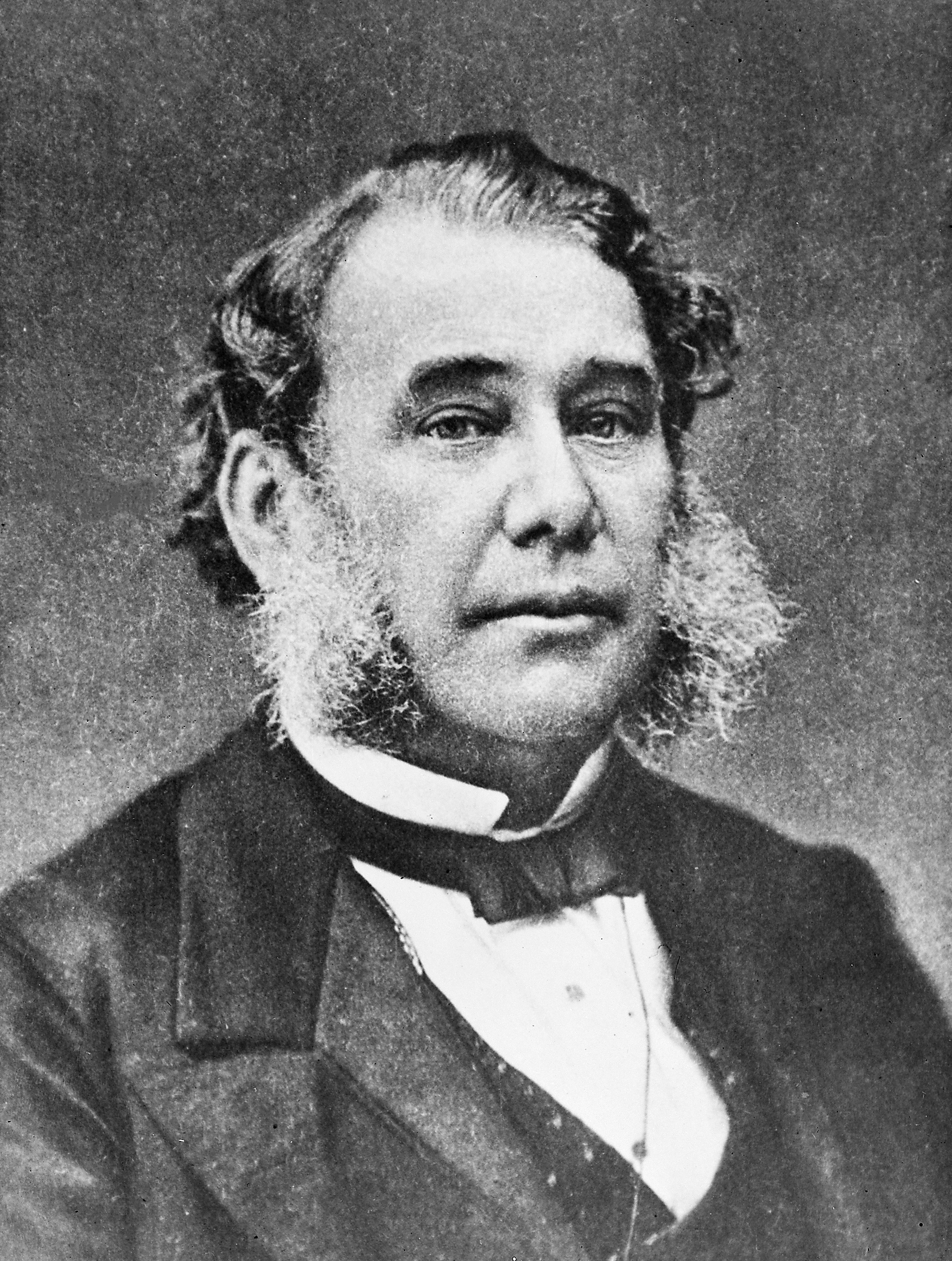
John Hilton

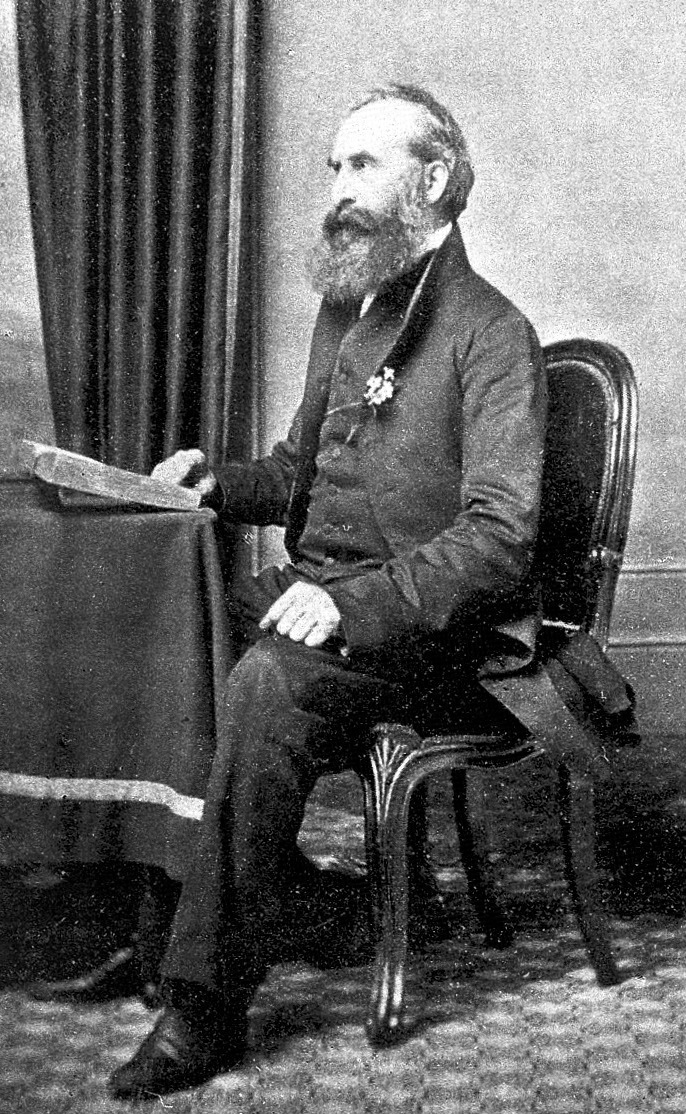
Thomas Hodgkin

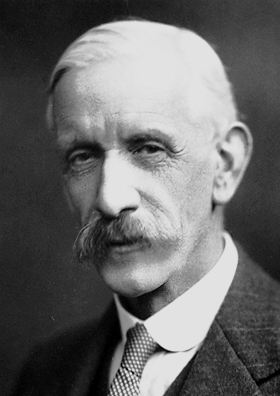
Frederick Gowland Hopkins

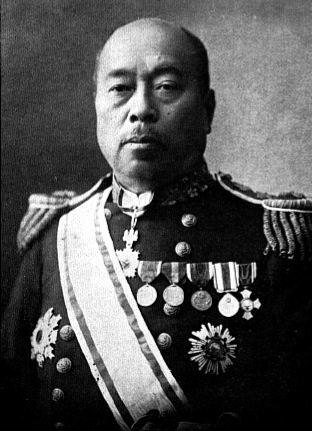
Takaki Kanehiro

John Keats

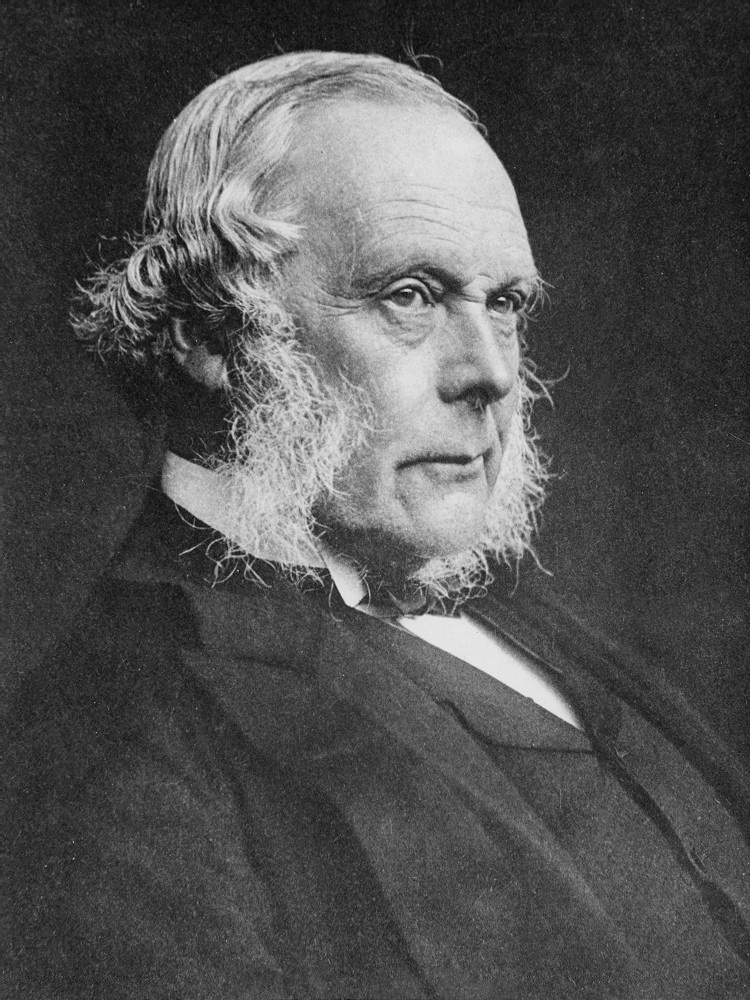
Joseph Lister

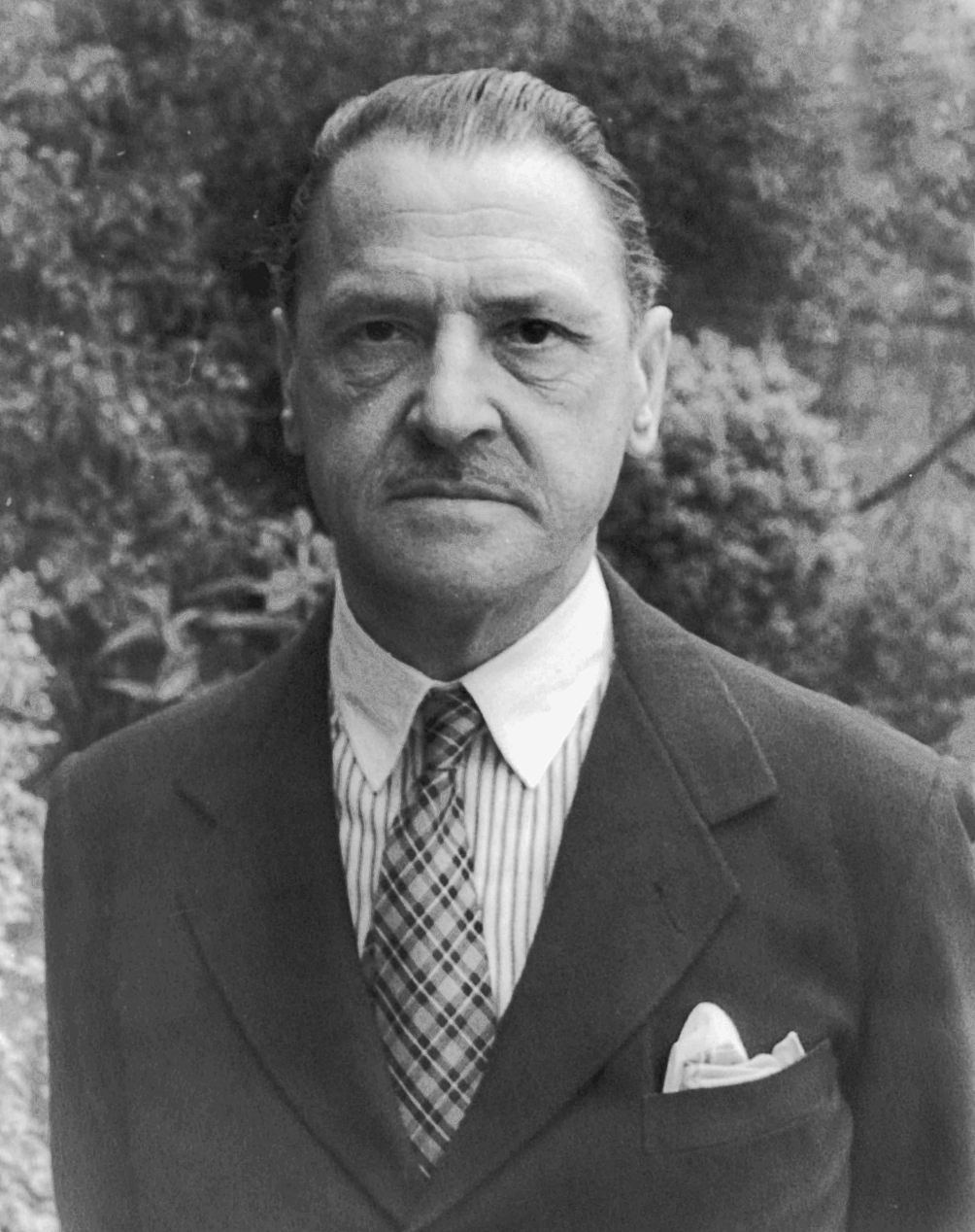
W. Somerset Maugham

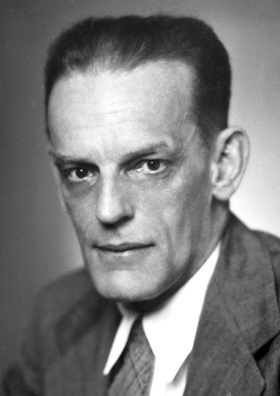
Max Theiler

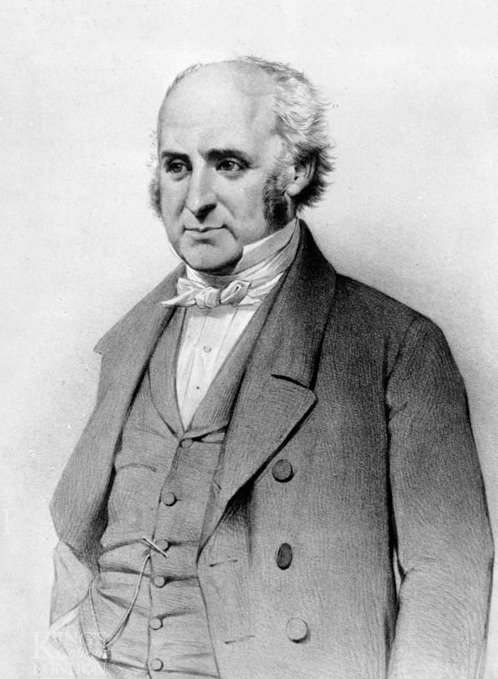
Robert Bentley Todd
- Recep Akdağ, Turkish Health Minister
- Eric Anson, New Zealand's first specialist anaesthetist
- Thomas Armitage, British physician and founder of the Royal National Institute of Blind People
- William Bowman, ophthalmic surgeon, helped found Ophthalmological Society of the United Kingdom
- Sir James Black, Nobel Prize laureate for Medicine in 1988 for work leading to the development of propranolol and cimetidine
- William Bowman, ophthalmic surgeon, helped found Ophthalmological Society of the United Kingdom
- Richard Bright, discoverer of Bright's disease
- Russell Brock, Baron Brock, pioneering cardiothoracic surgeon
- Sir Astley Cooper, discoverer of the Cooper's ligaments of the breasts
- John Leonard Dawson, Serjeant Surgeon to the Royal Household of the United Kingdom
- Richard Doll, epidemiologist and physiologist; established link between smoking and cancer
- Havelock Ellis, physician, sexual psychologist and social reformer
- Reita Faria, Indian model and Miss World 1966
- William Fergusson, surgeon who introduced the practice of conservative amputation
- David Ferrier, pioneering experimental neurologist
- Abraham Pineo Gesner, surgeon and inventor of kerosene refining
- John Hilton, great anatomist and surgeon
- Thomas Hodgkin, discoverer of Hodgkin's lymphoma
- Sir Frederick Hopkins, discoverer of vitamins
- Takaki Kanehiro, Japanese naval doctor, first person to discover the link between beriberi and diet
- John Keats, writer
- Joseph Lister, pioneer of aseptic surgery
- W. Somerset Maugham, playwright, novelist, short story writer
- Alex Mowat, professor of paediatric hepatology
- Kypros Nicolaides, Fetal medicine pioneer, most cited OB/GYN in the world, professor of Fetal Medicine at King's
- Uchenna Okoye, cosmetic dentist and media personality
- Humphry Osmond, psychiatrist who worked with psychedelic drugs and coined the term
- David Owen, Labour Foreign Secretary and founder of the Social Democratic Party
- Sir Alfred Poland, the first to describe Poland syndrome
- Sir Andrew Pollard, Chief Investigator on the Oxford–AstraZeneca COVID-19 vaccine
- Dame Cecily Saunders, nurse, physician and social worker who developed the concept of the hospice and was a pioneer of palliative care
- Audrey Smith, cryobiologist who discovered the use of glycerol to protect human red blood cells during freezing
- Jeffrey Tate, conductor
- Max Theiler, virologist, awarded the 1951 Nobel Prize in Physiology or Medicine for developing a vaccine for yellow fever
- Sheo Bhagwan Tibrewal, Orthopedic surgeon and Padma Shri awardee
- Robert Bentley Todd, known for discovering and describing the condition postictal paralysis now known as Todd's palsy
- Gerard Folliott Vaughan, UK psychiatrist, who became a politician and minister of state during Margaret Thatcher's government
- Sir Samuel Wilks, pathologist
- Claire Windsor, wife of the Earl of Ulster and physician by profession
- Fiona Wood AM, plastic surgeon, Australian of the Year 2005
- Brian McArdle, physician to Guy's Hospital and discoverer of the eponymous McArdle's disease (glycogen storage disease type V).
