= Imperial College School of Medicine Students' Union =

Medical students' union in London, England

- Institution: Imperial College London
- Location: South Kensington, London, England, United Kingdom
- Established: 1997
- President: Isaac Cowley
- Members: 2,600
- Affiliations: Imperial College Union
- Website: icsmsu.com

Imperial College School of Medicine Students' Union (ICSMSU) is the students' union of the Imperial College School of Medicine. It is charged with representing and advocating for the educational, pastoral, social and extracurricular needs of all the undergraduate students within the Faculty of Medicine of Imperial College London, and is a constituent union of Imperial College Union.

== History ==
ICSMSU was formed in 1997 by the mergers of the Students' Unions of St Mary's Hospital Medical School, Charing Cross and Westminster Medical School (formerly Charing Cross Hospital Medical School and Westminster Hospital Medical School), and the Royal Postgraduate Medical School.

Rivalry was abundant before and during the years of mergers. The 1954 film Doctor in the House was reportedly based on the behaviour of the St Mary's students.

== Executive committee ==
The Union has one full-time sabbatical president, Isaac Cowley, supported by 22 student volunteers, each covering areas such as academics, clubs & societies, entertainments, welfare, and the internal executive functioning of the Students' Union.

There are also committee members of the Students' Union responsible for looking after students studying BSc Medical Biosciences, which falls under the Imperial College School of Medicine.

== Academics and Welfare ==
The Academic Chair and three MBBS academic officers, along with the respective year representatives, oversee the academic needs of the 6-year MBBS/BSc course and all students undertaking BSc courses. The Academic Officer for Medical Biosciences looks after needs specific to students undertaking the BSc Medical Biosciences (BMB) course.

ICSMSU runs a "Mums and Dads" programme which aims to match up new students with older students on the same course, in order to provide pastoral and social support and a more informal basis.

== Clubs and Societies ==
There are currently over 65 student-run clubs and societies dedicated for members of the ICSMSU. Many of the bigger clubs can trace their history back to the original hospital medical schools. Most of the clubs compete in the United Hospitals competitions, or send players to the combined teams. Notable clubs and societies include Imperial Medicals Rugby Club, ICSMSU Boat Club, ICSM Water Polo, Muslim Medics and Light Opera.

=== Sports ===
ICSMSU also has a strong sporting ethos inherited from its predecessors. It enjoys frequent success against the other London medical schools in the United Hospitals and National Association of Medics' Sports competitions and in the BUCS league.

While medical students may join Imperial College Union (ICU) sports clubs (and non-medical students may join the medical clubs and societies), most prefer to participate in ICSMSU sports teams which, depending on the sport, may compete against Imperial College or other Imperial faculty teams such as the Royal School of Mines, such as in the annual Varsity competition, which involves teams from ICSMSU and ICU. The competition culminates in the J. P. R. Williams Cup, named after the highly successful Welsh rugby player and doctor J. P. R. Williams, who graduated from St Mary's Hospital, London in 1973, with the 1st XVs of Imperial Medicals Rugby Club and ICU Rugby playing each other in front of a 1,500-strong crowd.

Sir Roger Bannister, another St Mary's Hospital Medical School alumnus gives his name to the trophy for the annual varsity athletics meet.

==== Boat club ====
ICSMBC was formed in 1997 by merging the Medical School Rowing Clubs from St Mary's Hospital, Charing Cross Hospital and Westminster Boat Club. They row out of and train at the Imperial College Boat Club which is situated on the River Thames in Putney. The current captain of ICSMBC is Bonnie Price. Predominantly the Club participates in United Hospital events, as a constituent club of the United Hospital Boat Club, though they also participate in races organised through British Rowing, such as the Men's and Women's Head of the River races.

In 2024 the women's crew made history, becoming the first women's crew to win every UH event that year- including the annual bumps race, which they won for the first time since 1999. The team was led by women's captain, Georgia Lowe.

==== Water Polo ====
ICSMSU Water Polo is the water polo team of Imperial College School of Medicine Students' Union. It came about pursuant to a merger of the Charing Cross Hospital, Westminster Hospital, and St Mary's Hospital water polo clubs.

===== History =====
The club in its modern form was founded in 1997 following the merger of the St. Mary's Hospital Water Polo Club with the Charing Cross and Westminster Hospitals Water Polo Club. One notable member of the constituent St Mary's Hospital Water Polo club was nobel laureate Sir Alexander Fleming.

In 2008 the club agreed a joint venture into the BUCS league with the Imperial College Swimming and Water Polo Club. This brought immediate success with the Imperial College/Medicals side being crowned Tier Two Champions in 2009/10, and thus securing promotion to the Premier Tier for the 2010/11 season. The joint BUCS team performed strongly again in the 2012/13 season finishing third in the Premier Tier. The current President is Renée Servin.

===== Competitions =====
The club focuses its efforts on the London Universities Sports League (LUSL), formerly known as the ULU League, in which it enters a mixed gender team and plays weekly matches against other London universities. The Varsity match against the Imperial College water polo team is played annually in March.

=== Light Opera ===
The origin of the medical school's musical theatre society is a 1943 production of Gilbert and Sullivan's Trial by Jury by students at St Mary's. Despite a trend towards more modern musicals, the name was maintained during the 1997 merger to honour the society's history, which includes performances attended by then HRH Princess Elizabeth in 1945, HRH Princess Margaret in 1957, and HRH Queen Elizabeth the Queen Mother in 1981.

Each year, Light Opera performs its main show in December and a so-called '24-Hour Opera' in April or May, hosts multiple 'Big Chill' open mic nights, and participates in other showcases. The 24-Hour Opera is a musical chosen, planned, and auditioned without revealing the show's identity. It is announced to the cast, crew, and public on one evening and performed the next; all proceeds are donated to charity.

The society maintains strong social traditions and also provides academic support for its numerous members. The current president of the society is Amy Curry.

== Events ==
ICSMSU runs a full social calendar, including long-standing events and traditions from the original medical school student bodies. This includes Freshers' Fortnight, Shrove Tuesday Final Year Dinner, Halfway Dinner, 'Snow Ball', recognition dinners for ICSMSU Sports clubs, Arts clubs, and Volunteering & Academic societies, and RAG Week (with associated RAG events across the year as well).

== Facilities ==
=== Charing Cross Campus ===
The main facilities for the medical students of the Imperial College School of Medicine are found in the Reynolds Building on the Charing Cross Hospital campus. Here you can find facilities owned and run by ICSMSU, including the Reynolds Bar, as well as a dance studio, clubs and society storage room and a common room. The Students' Union office is located on the ground floor.

=== South Kensington Campus ===
The Sir Alexander Fleming Building serves as the home of ICSM on the central South Kensington Campus. Here ICSMSU has a suite of offices for use of the President and SU, as well as a common room, locker room and merchandise shop.

=== Other Campuses ===
ICSMSU are responsible for the upkeep of the common room located on the ground floor of the Wolfson Building at the Hammersmith Hospital campus, and for lobbying the faculty and NHS trusts for the upkeep and improvement of student facilities at the other respective teaching hospital sites, including Chelsea and Westminster Hospital and St Mary's Hospital, London.

== Alumni ==
2004 saw the first set of ICSM doctors graduate, and so the ICSM Alumni Association was founded. Run with heavy input by ICSMSU, the association aims to provide funding for the clubs and societies of the medical school, as well as offer support to students. Additionally, ICSMSU has a close affiliation with the St Mary's Hospital Association (SMHA) who equally supports students including through funding of grants, bursaries, and clubs and society awards.
