= Chelsea and Westminster Hospital =

Hospital in London

- Chelsea and Westminster Hospital NHS Foundation Trust
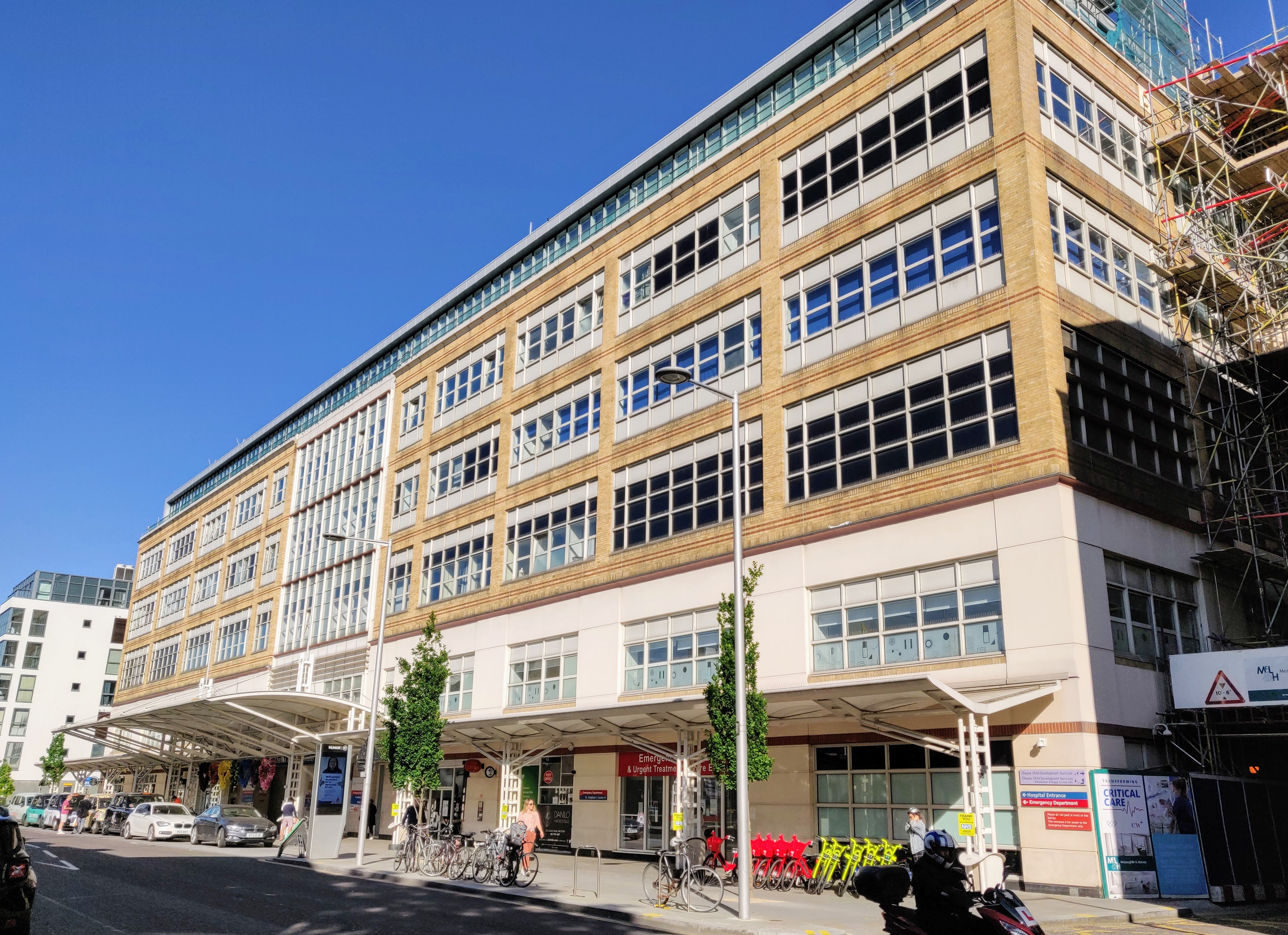
- Entrance on Fulham Road

- Shown in Kensington and Chelsea

Geography
- Location: 369 Fulham Road, Chelsea, London SW10 9NH, England
- Coordinates: 51.484°N 0.182°W

Organisation
- Care system: NHS England
- Type: Teaching
- Affiliated university: Imperial College London

Services
- Emergency department: Yes
- Beds: 430

History
- Founded: May 1993; 33 years ago

Links
- Website: chelwest.nhs.uk
- Lists: Hospitals in England

Chelsea and Westminster Hospital is a 430-bed teaching hospital located in Chelsea, London. The hospital has a rich history in that it serves as the new site for the Westminster Hospital. It is operated by Chelsea and Westminster Hospital NHS Foundation Trust, and became a member of Imperial College Academic Health Science Centre (Imperial AHSC) in July 2020. The hospital is the central part of Imperial College London Chelsea and Westminster Campus, and plays an integral role in teaching students and conducting medical research at Imperial College London.

Exterior view of Chelsea and Westminster Hospital

== History ==
The first hospital on the site was conceived in 1876 and officially opened as the St George's Union Infirmary in February 1878. This facility became St Stephen's Hospital in 1925.

In 1930 the hospital was transferred to the London County Council under the Local Government Act 1929. At this time the medical superintendent was D S Sandiland MRCS LRPC (Lond) and the steward was W Starns, there were 788 beds. Miss E J Booth was Matron. Booth was Matron from 1911 to 1942.

It joined the National Health Service in 1948 and continued in service until it closed in 1989. Part of the old hospital survives as an HIV unit known as "St Stephen's Centre".

The Chelsea and Westminster Hospital, which was designed by the architects Sheppard Robson, was built on the St Stephen's Hospital site and was officially opened by Queen Elizabeth II in May 1993. It brought together staff, services and equipment from five other hospitals in London:

- St Stephen's Hospital (1876–1989), the original hospital on the site
- St Mary Abbots Hospital (1871–1992), in Marloes Road
- West London Hospital (1856–1993), in Hammersmith Road, known for its maternity services in the 1970s
- Westminster Hospital (1719–1992), in Horseferry Road, and its medical school in Page Street.
- Westminster Children's Hospital (1903–1995), on Vincent Square

The hospital displays many treasures from the predecessor hospitals. Some of these are in the first floor hospital chapel, including a 16th-century painting by Veronese from the Westminster Hospital and stained glass windows from St Mary Abbots Hospital and the Westminster Children's Hospital.

In 2026, Vivienne Taylor, a former patient of Miss Tina Rashid, stalked her at both Chelsea and Westminster Hospital and Parkside Private Hospital, for over 5 years. She subsequently pleaded guilty at Westminster Magistrates' Court and was sentenced at Isleworth Crown Court and imprisoned for 14 months for stalking involving severe alarm and distress. Vivienne was given an indefinite restraining order from ever contacting the consultant gender affirmation surgeon again.

== Services ==
Chelsea and Westminster maintains a range of medical and surgical acute services:

=== Hand trauma ===
The hospital provides a number of services which include a specialist hand surgery/management unit sometimes known as HMU.

=== HIV / GUM ===
The hospital's HIV/GUM Clinical Directorate was established in April 1991, and is today the largest specialist HIV unit in Europe, and enjoys a worldwide reputation as a centre of excellence in both the care of HIV-positive patients and a wide range of associated clinical research.

The St Stephen's Centre is also home to the core laboratory of the International AIDS Vaccine Initiative (IAVI).

=== Radio Chelsea and Westminster ===
Radio Chelsea and Westminster is the hospital's own hospital radio station, available for; patients, staff and the local community. It was launched in 1977 to provide music and escapism for patients. Patients are able to listen to the hospital radio on Channel 6 on their hospedia bedside unit, or online at www.radiocw.org. The radio station has featured in a number of locations around the hospital it is currently on the second floor of the hospital between lift banks C and D.

== Education ==
In 1984, Westminster Hospital Medical School merged with the Charing Cross Hospital Medical School to form Charing Cross and Westminster Medical School. This was part of a series of mergers of London medical schools in the early 1980s, foreshadowing a larger series in the late 1990s, which brought all the institutes together into five large schools. In 1997, as part of the second wave, CXWMS merged with Imperial College, London (and its medical department, St Mary's Hospital Medical School), the National Heart and Lung Institute, and the Royal Postgraduate Medical School, to form Imperial College School of Medicine. Chelsea and Westminster Hospital maintains strong ties with Imperial College School of Medicine and is a teaching hospital for students undergoing clinical attachments in various specialties.

== Charity ==
CW+ operates as the hospital's charitable arm, raising funds for new facilities and medical equipment across the trust, as well as an art programme which features works by Damien Hurst and Tracey Emin. In 2026, a £1 million donation from the Sackler Trust, operated by the Sackler family, drew scrutiny because of the family's association with Purdue Pharma and OxyContin-related litigation.

== Notable alumni ==
- Dame Sarah Mullaly, the first female Archbishop of Canterbury was a director of nursing at the hospital, before she was appointed a Chief Nursing Officer at the Department of Health.

== Notable births ==
Notable births include:

- Fabien Frankel, English actor
- Dakota Blue Richards, English actress
- Sienna Elizabeth Mapelli Mozzi (born 2021), first daughter of Princess Beatrice of York and Edoardo Mapelli Mozzi
- Athena Elizabeth Rose Mapelli Mozzi (born 2025), second daughter of Princess Beatrice of York and Edoardo Mapelli Mozzi

== Notable deaths ==
Notable deaths include:

- Christopher Lee, English actor, died on 7 June 2015
- Maggie Smith, English actress, died on 27 September 2024

== See also ==
- List of hospitals in England
- Christina Beardsley
