= Charing Cross Hospital Medical School =

Coordinates: 51.4872°N 0.2202°W

Charing Cross Hospital Medical School (CXHMS) was the oldest of the constituent medical schools of Imperial College School of Medicine.

Charing Cross remains a hospital on the forefront of medicine; in recent times pioneering the clinical use of CT scanning, reflective of its position as one of the most important neuroscience centres in London; and advances in oncology and chemotherapy. Students of the medical school have benefited from this expertise, with many taking a research interest in these areas during their training.

== History ==
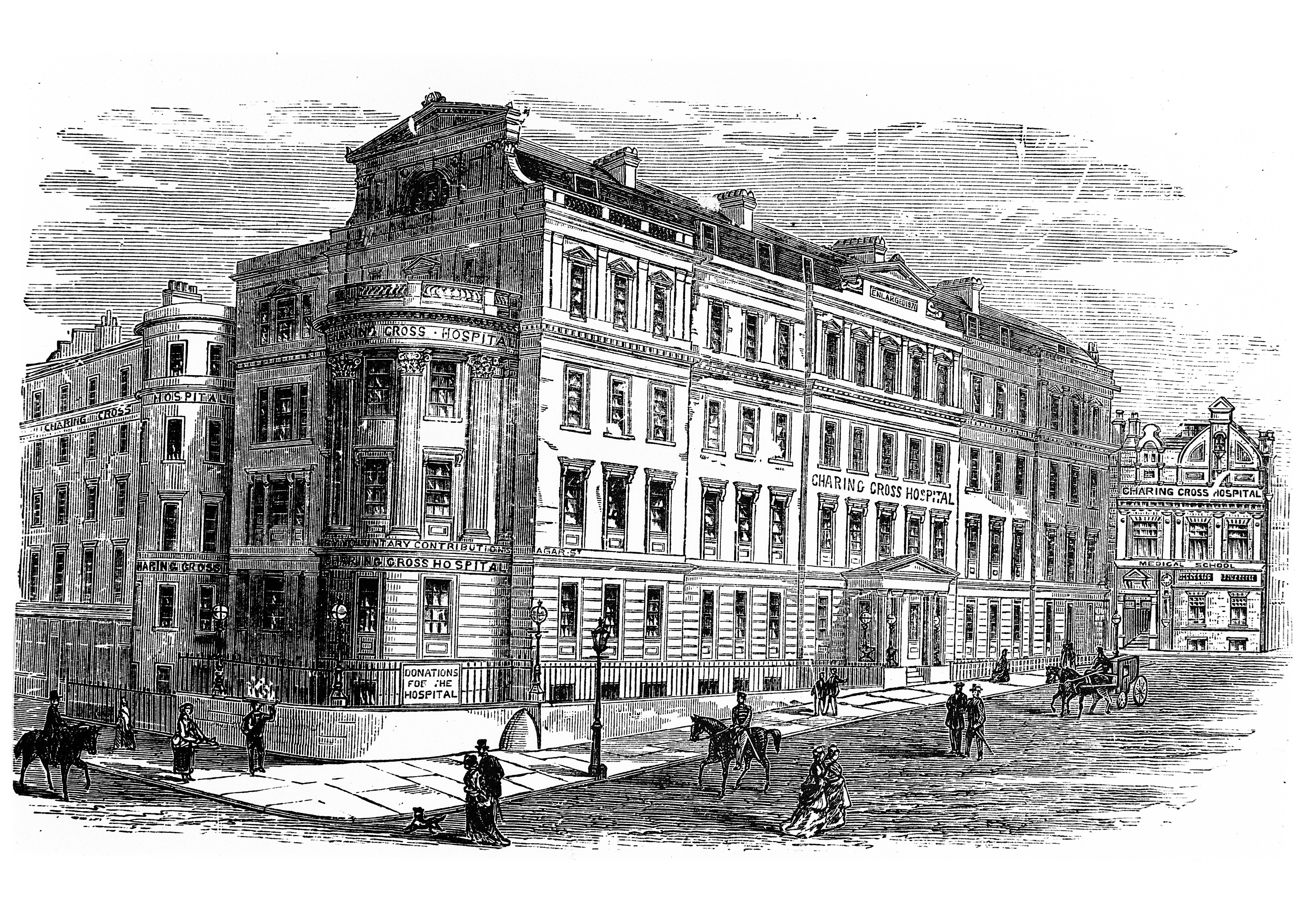
Charing Cross Hospital and Medical School in 1881, in Charing Cross

Charing Cross Hospital was founded in 1818, as the 'West London Infirmary and Dispensary', by Dr Benjamin Golding, to meet the needs of the poor who flocked to the cities in search of work in the new factories. The hospital started training medical students in 1822. This was a revolutionary notion at a time when London doctors mainly practised privately. The hospital was well patronised, and soon had to move to larger premises in Agar Street (near Villiers Street, off the Strand), where it first became known as Charing Cross in 1834.

Buildings on this site were expanded several times, but by the late 1950s it became clear that no further expansion would be possible in the area, and the hospital would have to move. Two sites were identified – a rebuild of the Fulham Hospital in west London, and a new-build site at Northwick Park in Harrow, north London. Whilst many staff supported the idea of moving to the northern suburbs, the Fulham site was selected and building began in the late 1960s. Northwick Park Hospital was built as well, but to a reduced budget.

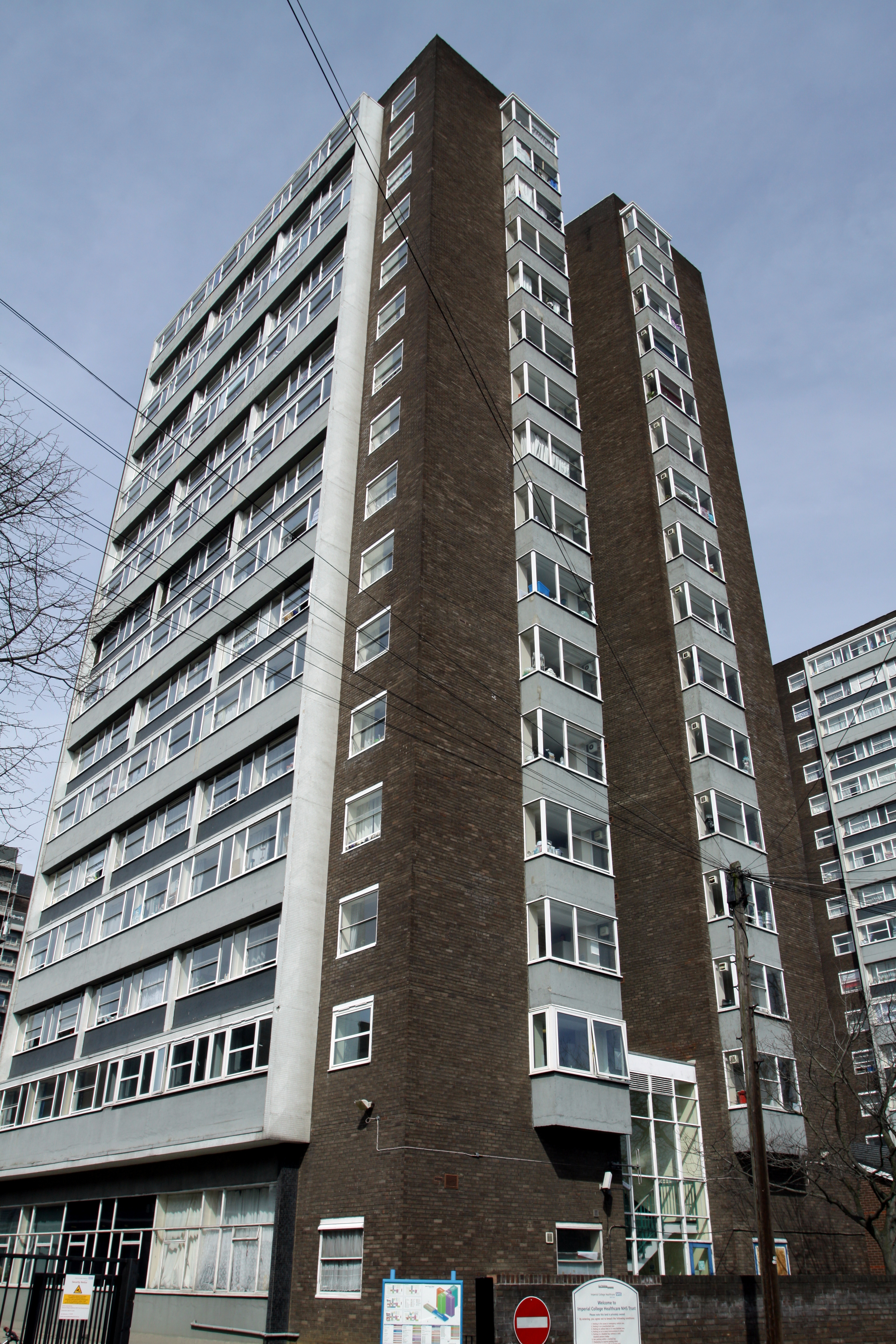
The modern hospital tower in Fulham

The new hospital opened in 1973, still known as Charing Cross Hospital. To avoid confusion, for the first ten years, correspondence was referred to "Charing Cross Hospital at Fulham".

From the opening of the new hospital in 1973, the medical school was contained entirely within the hospital tower (in the east wing laboratory block), but in 1976 the medical school's own building (the Reynolds Building) was completed. Housing the CXHMS students’ union (now part of Imperial College School of Medicine Students' Union, it saw the start of many ongoing traditions, including the annual "Invasion of London", in which garishly-dressed students persuade commuters and other city folk to donate to charity. A large brass Maltese cross was brought from the old (Strand) site to the bar to serve as the students' emblem, and newly qualified doctors traditionally "Sign the Cross" on graduation.

=== Merger ===
In 1984, CXHMS merged with local rivals Westminster Hospital Medical School to form Charing Cross and Westminster Medical School (CXWMS). This merger took place against the background of a series of mergers between London medical schools in the early 1980s, which foreshadowed the second, larger round of mergers in the late 1990s. During this round, CXWMS merged with Imperial College, London (whose medical department was at St Mary's Hospital Medical School), the National Heart and Lung Institute at the Royal Brompton Hospital, and the Royal Postgraduate Medical School to form Imperial College School of Medicine.

== Alumni ==
- Carys Bannister
- Patrick Dixon
- Joseph Fayrer
- Constance Fozzard
- Robert Heptinstall, chair of the Pathology department, Johns Hopkins Hospital
- Rosalind Hurley
- Thomas Henry Huxley
- Bruce Keogh, former Medical Director of the NHS
- Louise Lake-Tack, Governor-General of Antigua and Barbuda, 2007-
- David Livingstone
- Cecil Lyster
- Moein Moghimi, professor of pharmaceutics and neuroscience at Durham University School of Medicine, Pharmacy and Health
- Christine Moffatt
- Duncan Pailthorpe
- William Kitchen Parker
- Ann Redgrave, wife of Steve Redgrave
- Edith Summerskill
- Jane Yardley, author
- Khushwant Lal Wig

== List of deans ==
Dean	Degrees	Took office	Left office
Benjamin Golding	MD	1821	1856
Henry Hancock	FRCS	1856	1867
W Hyde Salter	MD FRCP FRS	1867	1868
Julius Pollock	MD FRCP	1868	1874
Francis Hird	FRCS	1874	1883
J Mitchell Bruce	MA MD FRCP	1883	1890
Stanley Boyd	MBBS FRCS	1890	1895
Hubert Montague Murray	MD FRCP	1895	1901
HF Waterhouse	MD CM FRCS	1901	1906
Christopher Addison	MD FRCS	1906	1907
FC Wallis	MBBS FRCS	1907	1910
CF Myers Ward	LRCP MRCS	1910	1911
William Hunter	MD CM FRCS FRS(Ed)	1911	1917
William J Fenton	MD FRCP	1917	1927
FH Young	OBE MD FRCP	1927	1930
Eric A Crook	MA MCh FRCS	1930	1940
RA Hickling	BA MD FRCP	1940	1944
HWC Vines	MA MD	1944	1950
Edwin C Warner	BSc MD FRCP	1950	1956
William J Hamilton	DSc MD FRCOG FRS(Ed)	1956	1962
Seymour JR Reynolds	MA MBBChir DMRE	1962	1976
Tony W Glenister	CBE TD MBBS PhD DSc	1976	1989
John EH Pendower	MBBS FRCS Barrister-at-Law	1989	1993
Roger M Greenhalgh	MA MD MChir FRCS	1993	1997
M Whitehouse	MA MD FRCP FRCP(Edin) FRCR	1997	

== Arms ==
Coat of arms of Charing Cross Hospital Medical School
Notes Granted 4 September 1934 Escutcheon Ermine a Maltese cross gules, thereon on a plate fimbriated Or between four fieurs de lys in cross of the last a rod of Aesculapius sable; on a chief gules between two bezants an open book argent, edged and clasps gold, inscribed with the words IN HOC SIGNO VINCES sable. Motto In hoc signo vinces (In this sign thou shalt conquer)

== See also ==
- Imperial College Healthcare NHS Trust
