= Mark Porter (general practitioner) =

British doctor, journalist and media personality (born 1962)

Mark Porter MBE
- Porter in 2009
- Born: Mark Christopher Milson Porter; 12 November 1962 (age 63); Ross-on-Wye, Herefordshire, England
- Education: University College London and Westminster Hospital Medical School
- Occupations: General practitioner; TV presenter; Radio presenter
- Children: 2
- Mark Porter's voice recorded May 2013

Mark Christopher Milsom Porter (born 12 November 1962 in Ross-on-Wye, Herefordshire, England) is a GP and medical correspondent for The Times and columnist for Saga Magazine.

Porter retired as a partner in NHS general practice in Wotton-under-Edge in Gloucestershire, and he lives in the Cotswolds with his wife, Ros, whom he married in July 1987 in Axbridge in Somerset. He is not, contrary to rumour, the cousin of Jeremy Clarkson.

== Education ==
He grew up in Ross-on-Wye in Herefordshire, and went to the independent schools Monmouth and Wycliffe College. He studied at University College London and Westminster Hospital Medical School (now Imperial College School of Medicine), and graduated in 1986.

He qualified as a GP in 1990 and was appointed an MBE for services to medicine in 2005. In the early 1990s, his surgery was at Locking Hill in Stroud, and he lived in Bisley, Gloucestershire from 1987. He then joined Culverhay Surgery in Wotton-under-Edge, where he became a GP partner.

== Media ==
He has had a long part-time career in the media, having joined the BBC in 1992 as the doctor for the show Good Morning with Anne and Nick, and was there for the show's whole run. He was the health editor for the Radio Times from 1993 to 2003. He presented the BBC One programme Watchdog Healthcheck. He took over from Dr Thomas Stuttaford as The Times' doctor in January 2009, and was also doctor to The One Show. He also presented Case Notes and Inside Health for BBC Radio 4. He further regularly appeared on The Jimmy Young Programme on BBC Radio 2, answering medical questions from listeners. He has also been a medical columnist for The Times (weekly) and Saga Magazine (monthly), and presents the podcast Experience Is Everything: The Health Edition.
