= Constance Fozzard =

English obstetrician and gynaecologist (1933–2021)

Constance Ethel Fozzard (10 February 1933 – 14 February 2021) was an English obstetrician and gynaecologist. She spent the majority of her career working for the National Health Service in Cornwall, and was heavily involved in the British Medical Association.

== Biography ==
Fozzard was born in 1933 in Hendon, London, to Albert Fozzard, a politician, and Ethel née Leibe, an American. She moved with her family to New Jersey in 1936 but returned to England with her mother following her parents' separation after the end of World War II. She attended Charing Cross Hospital Medical School, completing her MBBS in 1958.

Fozzard was a house medical officer at Mount Vernon Hospital and resident medical officer in obstetrics at Charing Cross Hospital and Queen Charlotte's and Chelsea Hospital. She met her husband, Randolph Wilbur "Bunt" White, at the latter hospital, where he was working as a resident pathologist. She returned to Charing Cross Hospital as a senior registrar in surgery, and became a Fellow of the Royal College of Surgeons of England in 1967. She then became a consultant obstetrician and gynaecologist for the Cornwall and Isles of Scilly Health Service, where worked in gynaecology at Camborne Redruth Community Hospital and obstetrics at the Princess Alexandra Maternity Hospital (part of the Royal Cornwall Hospital). She established a colposcopy service in Cornwall and jointly ran a gynaecological cancer service.

Fozzard was heavily involved in the British Medical Association and served as chair of its Cornish division, its regional consultants committee, and its retired members forum. She was also involved in local politics, and was elected as a district councillor for Carrick and a city councillor for Truro. She died on 14 February 2021 in Truro. She and her husband had no children; her former colleague Peter Callen wrote that she was told as a registrar by a senior surgeon "that it was incompatible for a woman to have a family and become a consultant. This I believe had a bearing on her decision not to have children, which in my opinion she later regretted."
