= Jean Ginsburg =

English physician and physiologist

- Born: 19 October 1926; London, England
- Died: 8 April 2004 (aged 77)
- Education: Somerville College, Oxford; St Mary's Hospital Medical School
- Spouse: Jack Henry
- Children: Three
- Scientific career
- Fields: Medicine; physiology; obstetrics; endocrinology
- Workplaces: St Thomas' Hospital, London; Charing Cross Hospital, London; Royal Free Hospital, London

Jean Ginsburg (19 October 1926 – 8 April 2004) was an English physician and physiologist who specialised in reproductive endocrinology and infertility.

== Early life ==
Ginsburg was born in London on 19 October 1926. Her parents were Russian-Jewish political refugees who had migrated in 1921 following the Russian Revolution. Her father, Naum Ginsburg, was a civil engineer who had been imprisoned for sheltering Leon Trotsky; her mother, Anya Bielenky, a pianist, had bribed a Bolshevik official to release her husband.

Ginsburg was educated at St Paul's Girls' School in London and Somerville College at the University of Oxford, where she gained an honours degree in physiology. She went on to study at St Mary's Hospital Medical School, and in 1952 became one of the first women to graduate from there.

== Career ==
Ginsburg began her medical career in research at St Thomas' Hospital in London in 1954. There, she studied changes to blood circulation during pregnancy and menopause. In 1961, she moved to Charing Cross Hospital, where she became a research fellow and senior lecturer in obstetrics. She moved to the department of obstetrics and gynaecology at the Royal Free Hospital in 1966, as a consultant endocrinologist. At the Royal Free Hospital, she helped to set up a service for gynaecological endocrinology and established one of the first menopause clinics in Britain. When gonadotropin hormones first became available for therapeutic use in the late 1960s, Ginsburg designed the first ovulation induction programme as a fertility treatment.

Throughout her career, Ginsburg published more than 250 articles. She wrote one book (The Circulation in the Female: From the Cradle to the Grave, 1989) and co-edited two others (Drug Therapy in Reproductive Endocrinology, 1996, and Sex Steroids and the Cardiovascular System , 1998). She was a founding member of the British Fertility Society.

== Personal life ==
Ginsburg was married to Jack Henry, an editor for Reuters, with whom she had two sons and a daughter. While in labour with her daughter, she monitored her own circulation for research. Her brother was the politician David Ginsburg. She was seriously injured in a car accident in 1968, and was told she might never walk again; she returned to work but walked with a cane for the rest of her life. She died on 8 April 2004 from kidney cancer.
