= Doctors to Be =

- Genre: Biographical documentary
- Country of origin: United Kingdom
- Original language: English

Production
- Producer: Edward Briffa
- Production locations: London, England
- Editor: Robin Brightwell
- Production company: BBC

Original release
- Network: BBC2
- Release: 26 October – 14 December 1992

Related
- Doctors to Be: 20 Years On

Doctors to Be is a biographical documentary series that was first broadcast on BBC2 by BBC Television and is also the name of a book, published by BBC Books, that accompanies the series. The television series follows 10 medical students who enrolled at St Mary's Hospital Medical School (now a part of Imperial College School of Medicine) in the 1985 intake of students. It starts in 1984 with their admission interviews, then follows them through five or six years as medical students, and ends with their first experiences of working as busy junior hospital doctors in the National Health Service.

The BBC decided to make the series in 1983 and contacted several medical schools. They selected St Mary's Hospital Medical School, London, England, partly because the dean, Prof Peter Richards, was enthusiastic about filming and thought that medical education was of public interest. Filming began in November 1984 when applicants were applying for university and going to interviews for the 1985 intake at St Mary's Hospital Medical School. St Mary's Medical School interviewed 419 applicants and 100 of these interviews were filmed. In the autumn of 1985, when studies had started, every student in the year was asked if they wanted to take part in the television series, and 10 students, who were thought to be outgoing and resilient to the pressures of filming, were chosen by the BBC. Each of the 10 medical students was filmed regularly and about 300 hours of film accumulated in total.

The series was one of the nominations for the best factual series at the 1992 British Academy Television Awards, although it did not win an award. An update, Doctors to Be: 20 Years On, was first broadcast on BBC Four in 2007.

== Participating medical students ==
The series focused on 10 medical students who enrolled at St Mary's Hospital Medical School, London in the 1985 intake:

- Dong Ching Chiu – A foreign student of Chinese origin from Sarawak, Malaysia. She moved to England aged 15 years to do her O levels and then A-levels at a boarding school, and she was aged 19 years at the time of her interview. Completed GP training
- David Copping – Completed GP training.
- Mark George – Completed training in general surgery.
- Jane Gilbert – Worked for a few years in ITV shows, now writes health articles.
- Will Liddell – A postgraduate, who attended admission interviews at age 26 years Completed GP training.
- Sarah Martindale – Completed anaesthetics training.
- Jane Morris –
- Fey Probst – Married at age 18 years, she was a mother of four before she became a medical student at age 26 years. Completed A&E training.
- John Shephard – A mature applicant of 28 years. He left school at age 16 years to join the Royal Fleet Auxiliary and married at the age of 20. He resigned his job in 1984 to start a one-year A-level course at a local college.
- Ese Stacey – She is in private practice, primarily in sports medicine. Completed GP training, followed by Sports & Exercise Medicine.
- Nick Hollings - Radiologist

== Cited texts ==
- Spindler, Susan (1992). Doctors to Be. BBC Books. ISBN 0-563-36095-X.
