= Duncan Pailthorpe =

English cricketer, physician, and soldier

Personal information
- Full name: Duncan Westlake Pailthorpe
- Born: 8 December 1890; Southampton, Hampshire, England
- Died: 21 December 1971 (aged 81); Alton, Hampshire, England
- Batting: Unknown

Domestic team information
- Years: Team
- 1928/29: Europeans

Career statistics
Competition	First-class
Matches	1
Runs scored	17
Batting average	8.50
100s/50s	–/–
Top score	17
Catches/stumpings	–/–
- Source: Cricinfo, 25 December 2023

Duncan Westlake Pailthorpe MC (8 December 1890 – 21 December 1971) was an English first-class cricketer, medical doctor, and an officer in the British Army.

== Life and military career ==
The son of J. E. Pailthorpe, he was born at Southampton in December 1890. He was educated at Epsom College, before matriculating to the Charing Cross Hospital Medical School. From there, he gained a commission in the Royal Army Medical Corps as a temporary lieutenant at the start of the First World War, with a temporary appointment to captain following in August 1915. Pailthorpe was awarded the Military Cross (MC) in September 1916, for gallantry and conspicuous bravery when attending to the wounded, with little regard for his own personal safety. In February 1918, he had been promoted to the full rank of captain. He was awarded a bar to his MC in September 1918, for collecting the wounded during a raid while under heavy fire. Working until daylight to achieve that end, he then went back out to confirm that a missing soldier was deceased and carried his body back to British lines. One month prior to the end of the war, he was made a temporary major, a rank which he relinquished after the war, in February 1919.

In March 1921, Pailthorpe was seconded for service with the Egyptian Army until March 1923. He was promoted to major in August 1926. He later served in British India, where he made a single appearance in first-class cricket for the Europeans cricket team against the Muslims at Lahore in the 1928–29 Lahore Tournament. Batting twice in the match, he was dismissed without scoring by Jahangir Khan in the Europeans first innings, while in their second innings he was dismissed for 17 runs by the same bowler. He retired from active military service in April 1934.

In addition to playing cricket, Pailthorpe also played rugby union and was a member of the Middlesex Rugby XV. He was married to Barbara Martin at St James' Church in Southampton in April 1930. Pailthorpe died in December 1971 at Alton, Hampshire.
