= Ray Donnelly =

Professor Ray Donnelly MBE FRCS (born 1936) is a British cardiothoracic surgeon and founder of the UK's only lung cancer charity, the Roy Castle Lung Cancer Foundation.

== Biography ==
Donnelly was born in Glasgow in 1936, graduated from St Mary's Hospital Medical School in 1961 and became a Fellow of the Royal College of Surgeons in Edinburgh in 1969. In 1973, he was a research fellow at Massachusetts General Hospital, and in 1975 was appointed a Consultant in Liverpool specialising in paediatric cardiac and adult thoracic surgery. From 1979 he devoted himself entirely to thoracic surgery, developing a number of innovative techniques.

== Career ==
He is the author of over 75 scientific papers. He has been was elected to membership of the American Association for Thoracic Surgery, the European Association for Cardio-Thoracic Surgery and the Society of Thoracic Surgeons. He served on the National Executive of the Society of Thoracic and Cardiovascular Surgeons of Great Britain and Ireland and was chairman of the Medical Research Council Working Party on cancer of the oesophagus.

He has been visiting professor to several universities abroad. He retired from surgical practice in 1998 and was appointed Professor of Lung Cancer Studies at Liverpool John Moores University, where he had previously been appointed an Honorary Fellow.

In 1990 Donnelly founded the Lung Cancer Fund to promote an intensive research programme into the causes, prevention and management of the disease. In 1993 he began development of an international centre for lung cancer research in Liverpool. Roy Castle was approached to give his name to the appeal to build the centre and twelve months after Roy died, the Trustees of the Lung Cancer Fund agreed to a proposal from Donnelly in 1995 to change the name of the charity to the Roy Castle Lung Cancer Foundation. Donnelly Stepped down as chairman in 1998 and retired as medical director of the foundation in March 2000, having been appointed vice president of the charity. He became president of the foundation in 2001.

In 1991, Professor Donnelly carried out the first keyhole surgery to remove a lung cancer.

In 1997, he opened a new Roy Castle Lung Cancer Foundation office in his home town of Glasgow, to provide patient information and support.

In 1998, he opened the world-renowned, international lung cancer research centre, in Liverpool.

In 2009, Professor Donnelly was appointed a Member of the Order of the British Empire (MBE) by the Queen.

In 2015, the charity he founded announced it was acquiring the award-winning, anti-tobacco short films competition for young people, Cut Films.

He has written three books: Cinderella Cancer, a personal history of the Roy Castle Lung Cancer Foundation, Roy Castle Remembered, and With Jesus to Calvary, reflections on the Stations of the Cross in verse.

He has been married for 54 years and has five children and six grandchildren. He enjoys his family, golf and writing.
