= Rosalinde Hurley =

20th-century British physician, administrator, ethicist, barrister

Dame Rosalinde Hurley DBE FRCPath FRCOG
- Born: 30 December 1929; England
- Died: 30 June 2004 (aged 74); England
- Education: Academy of the Assumption, Massachusetts
- Alma mater: Charing Cross Hospital Medical School, University of London
- Occupations: Physician, microbiologist, pathologist, medical administrator, ethicist, barrister
- Spouse: Dr Peter Gortvai

Dame Rosalinde Hurley, Mrs Gortvai DBE FRCPath FRCOG (30 December 1929 – 30 June 2004), was a British physician, microbiologist, pathologist, public health and medical administrator, ethicist and barrister. She was knighted in 1988 for her services to medicine and public health.

Her public positions included: Consultant Microbiologist, Queen Charlotte's Hospital (1963–1995); Honorary Consultant (1995–2004; her death), Professor of Microbiology, London University (1973–1975); Professor Emeritus, 1975–1995), board member, Public Health Laboratory Service (PHLS), chairman, The Medicines Commission (1982–93), President of the Pathology Section, Royal Society of Medicine (awarded the C. ver Heyden de Lancey prize, 1991).

She was a professor and consultant medical microbiologist, researcher, and ethicist, as well as a barrister; she applied her legal training and expertise for the benefit of her medical, and especially her microbiological, practice.

== Biography ==
Born in England on 30 December 1929 to a Roman Catholic family, the daughter of William and Rose Hurley, her early education was at the Academy of the Assumption in Massachusetts. She remained a lifelong Catholic.

She and her brother had been evacuated to the United States during the Second World War to live with a friend of her father. She returned to England in 1948 and studied medicine at Charing Cross Hospital Medical School while at the same time studying law. In four years she qualified in medicine (LRCP, MRCS and MBBS in 1955) and became a barrister at law. She never practiced law, but the training made her an effective administrator, and she gave informal legal advice to the Royal College of Pathologists and elsewhere. She took the Diploma in Literature of the University of London in 1956 and won the Gilchrist Prize and the Churton Collins Prize in Literature while a pre-registration house officer at the Wembley and West London hospitals.

She was called to the Bar at the Inner Temple in 1958 and was awarded LLB in 1959 while a lecturer and assistant clinical pathologist at Charing Cross Hospital and Medical School. Her medical thesis on perinatal candida infections led her permanent interest in mycology. She later became a member of the Public Health Laboratory Service (PHLS) Board when the service's infectious diseases surveillance role was becoming more prominent and the Communicable Disease Surveillance Centre was also expanding. By the 1980s the PHLS needed an ethical review of its own research projects as well as advice regarding the ethics of its broader programmes of disease surveillance and vaccine evaluation. Hurley established a committee that reported to the board but operated independently of it. After she had completed two terms as a board member, she continued as the Ethics Committee chair until the mid-1990s.

== Personal life ==
In 1963, around the time she became a consultant, she married Dr Peter Gortvai, a neurosurgeon of Hungarian descent, at St Bartholomew's and Romford hospitals. They had no children. In later life Peter Gortvai suffered from heart disease and he died on 20 February 1995. Dame Rosalinde died on 30 June 2004, aged 74, from undisclosed causes.
