= Carys Bannister =

British neurosurgeon

- Carys Bannister
- Born: 1935; Recife, Pernambuco, Brazil
- Died: 20 August 2010 (aged 72); Burnley, Lancashire, England
- Education: Charing Cross Hospital Medical School; Somerville College, Oxford
- Medical career
- Field: Neurosurgery
- Institutions: North Manchester General Hospital; University of Manchester Institute of Science and Technology
- Sub-specialties: Brain's blood supply and congenital disorders of the central nervous system

Carys Margaret Bannister OBE (1935 – 20 August 2010) was the second female neurosurgeon to be appointed in the United Kingdom. Born in Brazil to Welsh parents, she moved to England as a teenager and trained in surgery after qualifying as a doctor. She spent most of her career as a consultant neurosurgeon at North Manchester General Hospital and as a researcher at the University of Manchester Institute of Science and Technology. She specialised in treating disorders of the cerebral circulation, spina bifida, and hydrocephalus.

== Early life ==
Carys Bannister was born in Recife, Brazil, in 1935. Her parents were Welsh and had moved from Aberystwyth to Brazil when her father took up an engineering job with the Great Western Brazilian Railway. After Bannister was born, the family moved to São Paulo and later Rio de Janeiro, where Bannister and her sister attended an American school. When their father was assigned to work in the Brazilian countryside, both daughters were sent back to Britain; Bannister was fifteen at the time. She was educated at a boarding school in Bramley, Surrey and Guildford County Technical College. In 1953, she won a state scholarship and successfully applied to Charing Cross Hospital Medical School, graduating in 1958.

== Career ==
Bannister began working as a house surgeon in 1958. She first started working in neurosurgery at Birmingham Accident Hospital, where she treated patients with head injuries. She then spent six months in Edinburgh at the Western General Hospital and the Royal Infirmary. She passed the fellowship exams of the Royal College of Surgeons of Edinburgh before beginning a postgraduate degree in neurophysiology at Somerville College, Oxford; her research involved the use of electrophysiology to study motor neurons. After completing the degree, she joined the Leeds General Infirmary department of neurosurgery, where she developed a technique known as extracranial–intracranial bypass to increase blood flow to the brain in patients with intracranial aneurysms and cerebral ischaemia.

In the 1970s, Bannister moved to Manchester, where she was appointed a consultant at North Manchester General Hospital and Booth Hall Children's Hospital. She maintained a research laboratory at the University of Manchester Institute of Science and Technology; her main research interests were the brain's blood supply and congenital disorders of the central nervous system. The latter led her to establish a fetal management unit at St Mary's Hospital, where she saw pregnant patients whose children had spina bifida and hydrocephalus. She retired in 2001.

== Honours ==
Bannister received an OBE in 1999 for her services to neurosurgery in Manchester. She was awarded an honorary DSc by the University of Manchester Institute of Science and Technology in 2001 for her research on hydrocephalus. The Carys Bannister Building at the University of Manchester is named in her honour.

== Personal life ==
Bannister was a rally car driver in her free time. She owned a property in the Rossendale Valley where she kept numerous farm animals; she also owned six corgis which she exhibited in dog shows. She died on 20 August 2010 in Burnley.

== See also ==
Diana Beck Britain's first female Neurosurgeon
