= Inside Health =

- Genre: Factual, discussion
- Running time: 30 minutes
- Country of origin: United Kingdom
- Language: English
- Home station: BBC Radio 4
- Hosted by: James Gallagher
- Produced by: Erika Wright; Beth Eastwood
- Original release: 10/01/2012
- No. of episodes: Series 1 – 9
- Website: https://www.bbc.co.uk/programmes/b019dl1b

Inside Health is a British radio programme broadcast on BBC Radio 4 discussing topical health issues which people struggle to understand. The first episode was broadcast on 10 January 2012. It is hosted by James Gallagher and broadcast on Tuesday mornings at 9:30am and repeated on Wednesdays at 9:30pm.

== History ==
BBC Radio 4 has broadcast health related programmes since its inception in 1967. Mark Porter joined show in 2012 and left in 2020. The show is now presented by BBC News correspondent James Gallagher.

== Content ==
The first programme discussed whether it really is better to take tablets for high blood pressure in the morning, as many people do - or whether it may be better to take them in the evening, as a recent Spanish study claimed. The second programme in the series, broadcast on 17 January 2012, asked whether memory really does decline with age. It also asked whether nicotine might actually protect against Alzheimer's disease, but was careful to state that it was NOT saying that smoking had any health benefits, clarifying very strongly how there is a difference between smoking and nicotine. The third programme, broadcast on 24 January 2012, discussed whether cough medicine is suitable for children. The speaker on the programme, Margaret McCarney, gave quite a negative review of cough medicine. The edition broadcast on 31 January referred to atrial fibrilation, and also discussed the drug warfarin. It finished by talking about the health risks of wearing high-heeled shoes. On 6 March, discussion of diabetes mellitus, and whether care for people aged 16–24 was as good for those of younger age groups, was a key part of the programme. This programme also discussed the use of Twitter in dissemination of medical knowledge, and in this part of the programme, stressed the importance of patient confidentiality. In a late stage of the programme, the skin condition Vitiligo was discussed, and fictions about this skin disorder - such as that the skin disorder vitiligo is contagious - were outlined. The programme broadcast on 13 and 14 March 2012 discussed whether exercise is good or bad for one's joints.
