= Imperial College School of Medicine =

Public medical school in London, England

Coordinates: 51°29′52″N 0°10′35″W

- Imperial College School of Medicine logo
- Type: Medical school
- Established: 1821 (Charing Cross Hospital Medical School); 1834 (Westminster Hospital Medical School); 1854 (St Mary's Hospital Medical School); 1984 (Charing Cross and Westminster Medical School); 1997 (Imperial College School of Medicine)
- Parent institution: Imperial College London
- Director: Professor Amir H. Sam
- Undergraduates: 2,200
- Location: London, England
- Affiliations: United Hospitals
- Website: www.imperial.ac.uk/medicine/study/undergraduate

The Imperial College School of Medicine (ICSM) is the undergraduate medical school of Imperial College London in England and one of the United Hospitals. It is part of the college's Faculty of Medicine and was formed by the merger of several historic medical schools. Its core campuses are located at South Kensington, St Mary's, Charing Cross, Hammersmith and Chelsea and Westminster.

== History ==
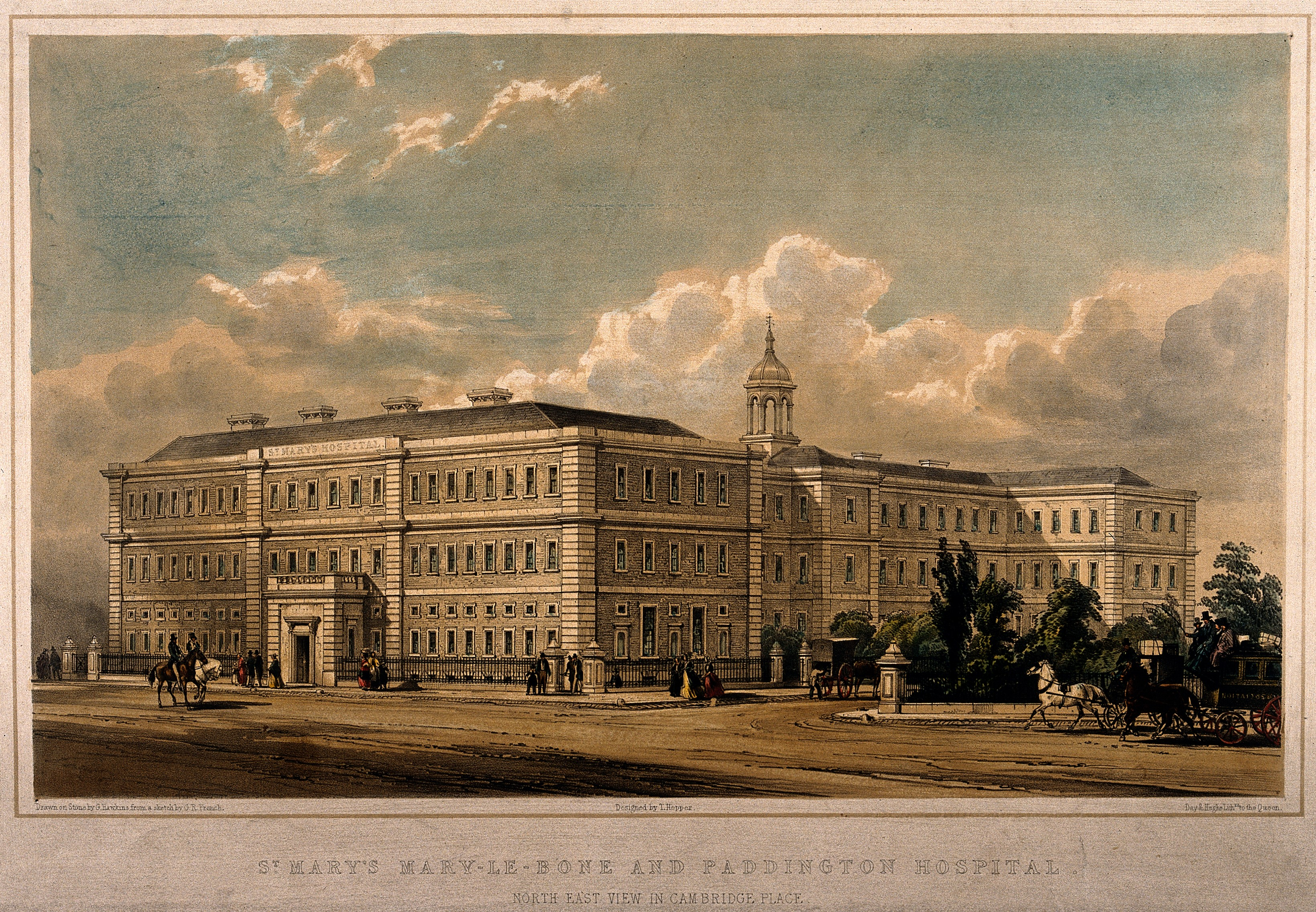
The original St Mary's Hospital

The medical school at Imperial College dates back to the founding of Charing Cross Hospital Medical School in 1823, which was followed by other medical schools including Chelsea and Westminster Hospital Medical School, St Mary's Hospital Medical School, and the Royal Postgraduate Medical School. Imperial College London first gained a medical school by merger with St Mary's Medical School in 1988. The current School of Medicine was formed in 1997 by the merger of St Mary's Medical School with Charing Cross and Westminster Medical School (formerly Charing Cross Hospital Medical School and Westminster Hospital Medical School), the Royal Postgraduate Medical School and the National Heart and Lung Institute. In 2001, the non-teaching aspects of the school were moved to the new Faculty of Medicine, which the school became a part of. In 2019, the medical school launched their new curriculum, integrating more team-based learning, social science, and early clinical experience into their course, which translates into broader fields of medicine, such as psychology.

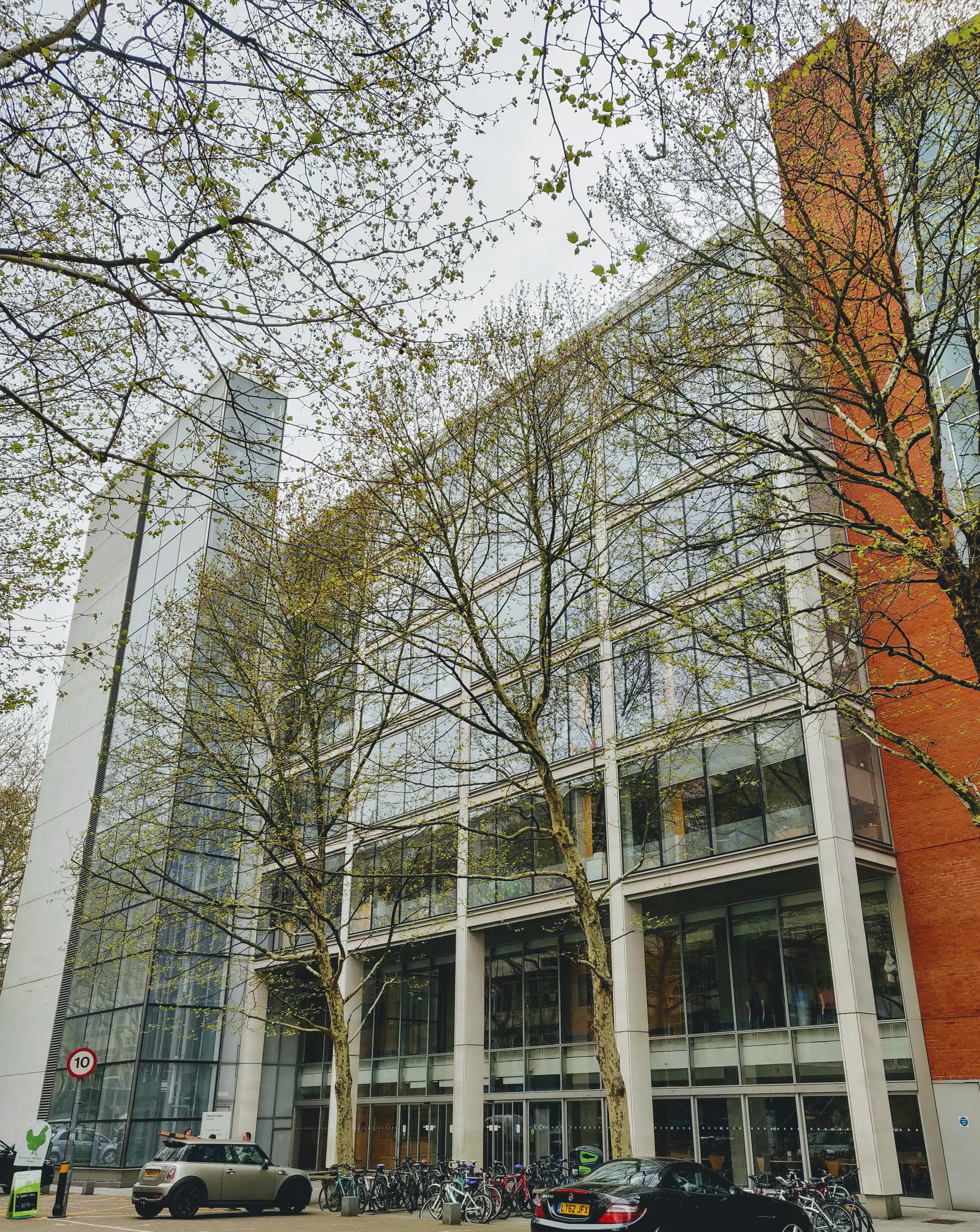
Sir Alexander Fleming Building, South Kensington

== Academics ==
=== Study ===
The school runs two undergraduate courses, on either a six-year course leading to an MBBS and BSc, or a three-year BSc course in medical biosciences. Graduates of the school are also awarded the Associateship of Imperial College School of Medicine, AICSM, alongside their medical degrees.

==== Six-year MBBS/BSc ====
As of 2019, Imperial College School of Medicine updated their entire curriculum, shifting towards a more integrated spiral curriculum, in which students cover most topics multiple times, adding more depth and range each year. They also vastly increased the amount of early clinical contact and team-based learning the students experience. The course is split into 3 'Phases'.

Phase 1 spans years 1-3 of the course (Phase 1a 1b, and 1c). Phase 2 is the BSc year, with the final two years of the course containing Phase 3a and 3b.

In Phase 1a students begin by learning the biochemistry underpinning medicine in their first module. By the end of Term 1 they move onto their main systems-based medicine module. Each system is covered both in Phase 1a and 1b, with a more clinical focus in Phase 1b, building on the scientific basis established in the year prior.

There is also a module that focuses on the wider determinants of health, looking at social, political, and economical factors which affect patients spanning the first two years of the course.

Across modules, there are other themes covered such as communication skills, medical ethics, professionalism and law. Teaching primarily comprises interactive lectures followed up often by smaller group tutorials. Other teaching methods include learning with cadaveric prosection (and later dissection), laboratory practical and clinical skills classes, independent study, and a lot of team-based learning.

Unique to Phase 1b is a clinical research experience, where students are attached to a medical research team in a company, hospital, or university to learn about and partake in research.

Phase 1c consists of three eight-week placements - the Medicine in the Community Apprenticeship (general practice placement), hospital medicine, and surgery. Within this, students will rotate through a number of specialties and wards - including a two-week hands-on anaesthetics placement during the surgery rotation.

Teaching consists of three weeks of induction at the start of the year; in-hospital clinical teaching, tutorials, simulations, history-taking, and examination practice; a mid-weekly central teaching program delivered by the university, and finally two weeks of intensive consolidation teaching at the end of each placement.

Finally, an innovative series of team-based cases integrating the clinical and scientific approach to various common diseases running through the first three years, where students work in, and are assessed, as a team.

(The new curriculum started four years ago. The information about the latter two years is based on the old course but is likely to be similar.)

Phase 2 involves study for the BSc, comprising three 5-week modules then a 10-week supervised research project or specialist course, leading to a BSc (Hons) in Medical Sciences with one of the following: Anaesthesia and Critical Care; Biomedical Engineering; Cancer Frontiers; Cardiovascular Sciences; Endocrinology; Gastroenterology and Hepatology; Global Health; Molecular and Translational Haematology; Humanities, Philosophy and Law; Immunity and infection; Management; Neuroscience and Mental Health; Pharmacology; Remote Medicine; Reproductive and Developmental Sciences; Surgical Design, Technology and Innovation; and Translational Respiratory Medicine. The following specialist courses are available instead of undertaking a research project: Medical Humanities, History of Medicine, Epidemiology, and International Health. BSc courses that have available places after the allocation of Imperial students are open to medical students from other universities who wish to intercalate.

Phase 3a covers the specialties of obstetrics and genecology, radiology, pediatrics, psychiatry, oncology, general practice, critical care, infectious diseases, dermatology, rheumatology and orthopedics through clinical attachments. It includes a 4-week course in clinical pathology at the start of the year and a one-week teaching skills course.

Phase 3b, the final year, consists of seven three-week clinical attachments in accident and emergency medicine; general practice; cardiology and radiology; ear, nose and throat, ophthalmology and renal medicine; two professional work experience attachments (one in medicine and one in surgery); one specialty choice module; an eight-week elective period which may be spent in the UK or overseas, and a practical medicine course, which provides specific preparation for the foundation year after graduation.

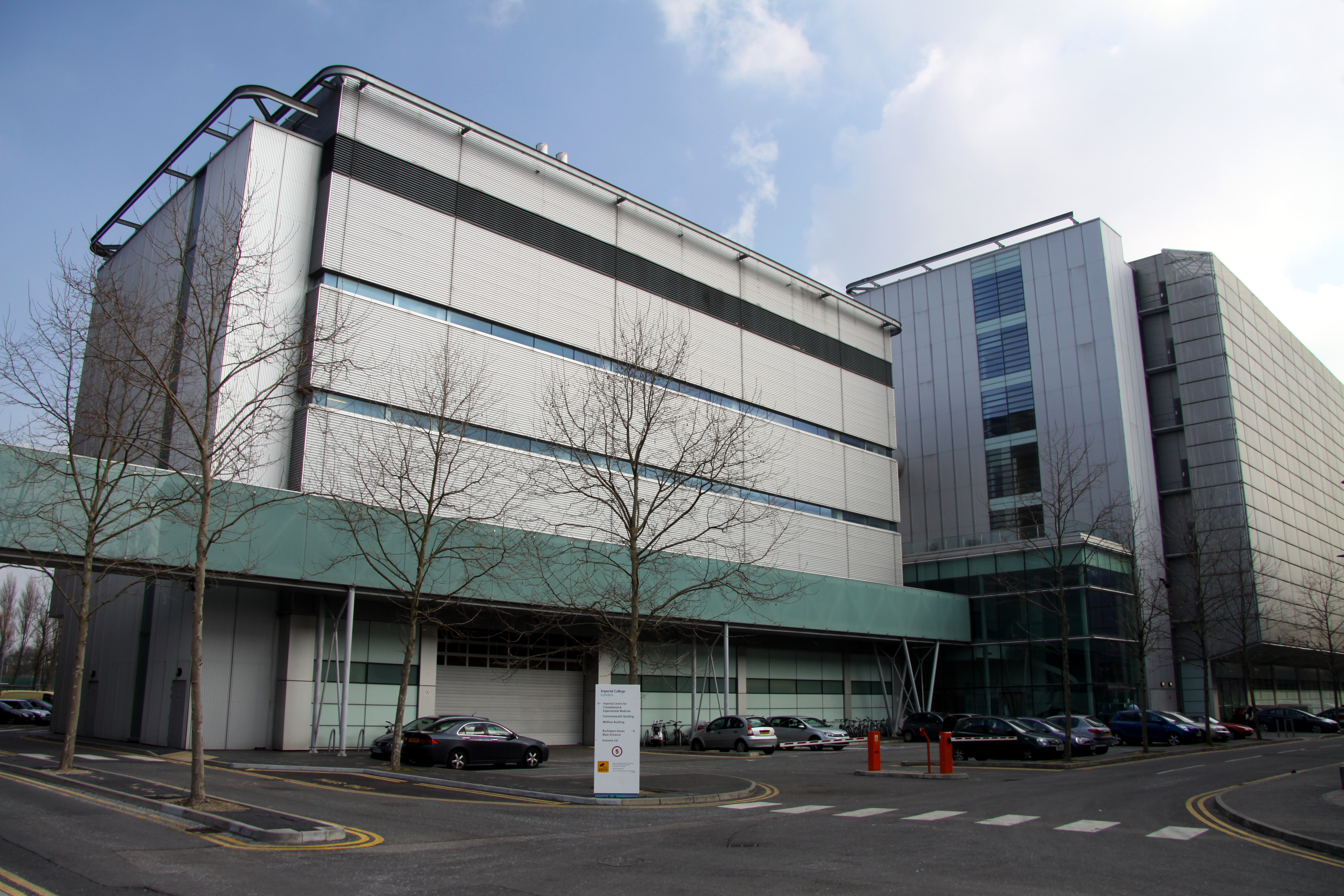
Hammersmith Hospital has some of the school's main clinical teaching facilities

==== Medical Biosciences ====
The school offers a 3-year BSc biomedical science degree which opened in 2006. The course was re-designed to reflect new teaching methods such as ‘flipped classroom’ and an intensive laboratory curriculum. Renamed Medical Biosciences, the course accepted its first cohort in 2017.

In the first and second years, students study fundamental human biology and the molecular basis of human disease. Modules on cellular and molecular biology and pharmacology underpin, for example, infectious diseases and immunology, cancer and neurobiology. Students learn to ‘think like a scientist’ with a research-intensive, laboratory-focused curriculum, whilst attending workshops on critical health issues and modules in science communication and ethics aimed to broaden their outlook and employability skills.

In the third-year students will choose specialist modules, each of which examines a global health problem, and a final year project. Students have the option to complete a 20-week intensive research project; a placement; or undertake a dissertation on a biomedical science topic. Placement possibilities may include industry, hospitals, publishing houses, museums, charities and government agencies.

Students also have the option of studying for a 4th year with Imperial College Business School, graduating in BSc Medical Biosciences with Management.

== Student life ==
=== ICSM Students' Union ===
In contrast to other universities, rather than a departmental society the School of Medicine has a separate and independently run constituent union, a part of the wider Imperial College Union. Around 65 clubs and societies are part of ICSMSU, dedicated for its students. Further, ICSMSU also has access to facilities located in the Reynolds building at the Charing Cross Hospital campus, as medical students live or spend more time around that area than the South Kensington campus.

=== ICSM Gazette ===
The Gazette is the magazine of the Medical School, derived from the publications of the founder schools: the St Mary's gazette, Charing Cross gazette and the Westminster Broadway. Copies of the Broadway since 1948 are available from the Imperial College archives and issues of the St Mary's Gazette since 1894 are collected in the St Mary's archives. The magazine in its current format is produced twice a year and features a report from the Students' Union and sections for news, alumni, events, academics, features, careers, travel and clubs and societies. Articles are also published online, and previous issues of the gazette are available on the website.

=== Shrove Tuesday Final Year Dinner ===
The Shrove Tuesday Final Year Dinner started in 1940 during the Blitz at the old Westminster Hospital Medical School. Students and house staff decided to have dinner to alleviate the oppressive mood. A senior member of staff was invited to address the assembled doctors and whilst he was talking a caricature was sketched on the tablecloth by one of his audiences. It was cut out, passed round, signed and mounted and started the unbroken tradition that has evolved into the Shrove Tuesday Final Year Dinner that has continued even after the amalgamation of Westminster Hospital Medical School into Charing Cross Hospital Medical School and then Imperial College School of Medicine.

Since 1997, the Shrove Tuesday Final Year Dinner has since been a fully student-led event run by the Imperial College School of Medicine Students' Union.

=== Alumni associations ===
The ICSM Alumni Association was founded in 2004 with the graduation of the first cohort of ICSM doctors. Still in its infancy, it is jointly run with help from ICSMSU and members of the alumni. The association aims to provide funding for the clubs and societies of the medical school, as well as offer support to students.

Two other alumni associations also exist for graduates of the original medical schools - the St Mary's Association and the Charing Cross and Westminster Alumni.

== Campuses and associated hospitals ==
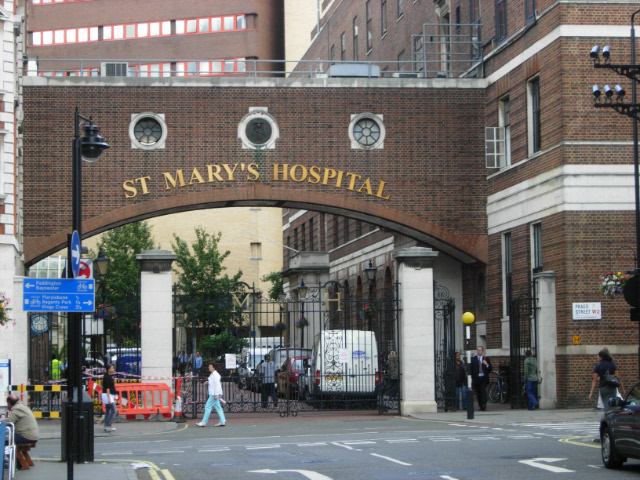
St Mary's in Paddington is a main teaching hospital for the school, housing the Fleming Library

The School's teaching campuses include:

- Undergraduate campus
  - South Kensington campus - Sir Alexander Fleming Building
  - Charing Cross Hospital campus - The Reynolds Building
  - Hammersmith Hospital campus - Wolfson Education Centre
- Main teaching hospitals
  - Charing Cross Hospital
  - St Mary's Hospital
  - Chelsea & Westminster Hospital
  - Hammersmith Hospital

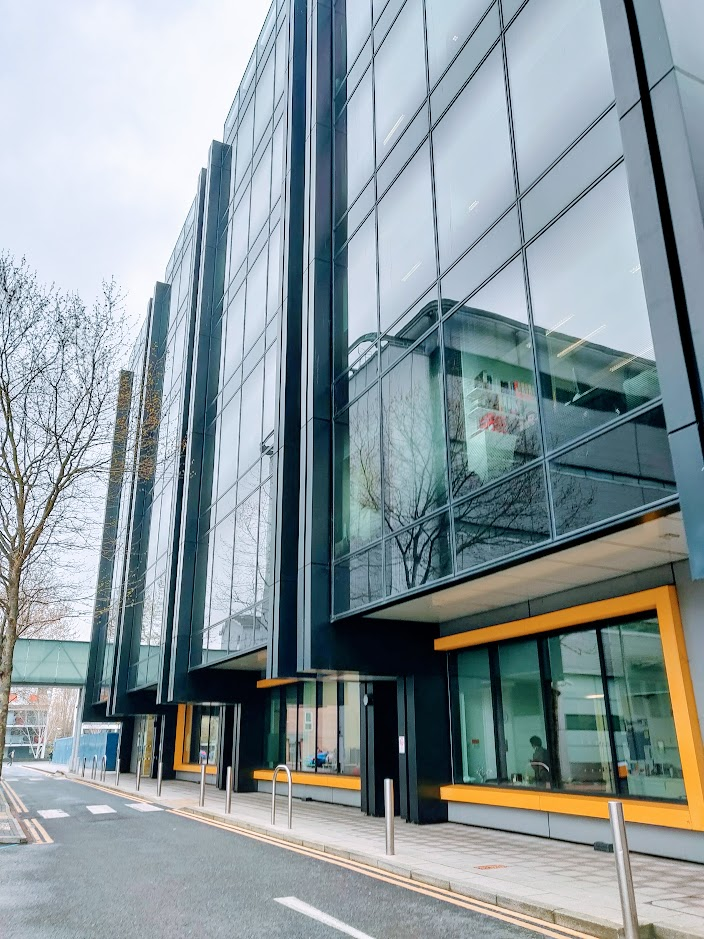
Imperial Centre for Translational and Experimental Medicine

Students in the 1st and 2nd years as well as those on the BSc courses attend lectures and labs mainly at the main campuses. Parts of the 4th year, as well as other clinical modules are also held at the postgraduate hospitals, where much of the faculty's research is based:

- Postgraduate hospitals
  - Royal Brompton Hospital
  - Harefield Hospital
  - Queen Charlotte's & Chelsea Hospital
  - Western Eye Hospital
- District general hospitals
  - Ashford Hospital
  - Central Middlesex Hospital
  - Ealing Hospital
  - Hillingdon Hospital
  - Mount Vernon Hospital
  - Northwick Park Hospital
  - St Mark's Hospital
  - West Middlesex Hospital
  - St Peter's Hospital, Chertsey
- Mental health hospitals
  - St Bernard's Hospital
  - St Charles' Hospital
  - West London NHS Trust
  - Gordon Hospital
  - Broadmoor Hospital
  - Cassel Hospital

Clinical attachments and teaching in years 1 (two weeks), 2 (five weeks), 3 (30 weeks), 5 and 6 (all year) are held at these hospitals.

== Notable staff and alumni ==
The list below, including five Nobel Laureates in Physiology and Medicine, shows the notable past or current staff and alumni from Imperial College School of Medicine or from the various institutions which are now part of it.

- Christopher Addison (Ex Leader of the House of Lords, Ex Minister for Health) Charing Cross Hospital
- N.H. Ashton (ophthalmologist, Buchanan medalist)
- Sir Ernst Chain (Nobel Laureate, Physiology and Medicine)
- Ara Darzi, Baron Darzi of Denham, Parliamentary Under-Secretary, Leading Surgeon) St Mary's Hospital
- Carl Djerassi (chemist; first oral contraceptive pill progestin norethisterone)
- Harold Ellis (surgeon and anatomist) Westminster Hospital
- Sir Joseph Fayrer (physician noted for his writings on medicine in India)
- Sir Marc Feldmann (expert on rheumatology) Kennedy Institute / Charing Cross Hospital
- Sneh Bhargava (former director and Professor Emeritus) All India Institute of Medical Sciences, New Delhi
- Sir Alexander Fleming (Nobel Laureate, Physiology and Medicine) St Mary's Hospital
- Sir Malcolm Green, (respiratory physiologist), vice-president faculty of medicine and head of National Heart and Lung Institute.
- John Henry (clinical toxicologist who did crucial work on poisoning and drug overdose) St Mary's Hospital
- Sir Frederick Hopkins (Nobel Laureate, Physiology and Medicine)
- Dame Rosalind Hurley (medical microbiologist, researcher, and ethicist)
- Sir Andrew Huxley (Nobel Laureate, Physiology and Medicine)
- Thomas Huxley (notable biologist) Charing Cross Hospital
- Sir Bruce Keogh (medical director of the National Health Service)
- Dame Louise Lake-Tack, Governor-General of Antigua and Barbuda Charing Cross Hospital
- David Livingstone (congregationalist pioneer medical missionary in South Africa) Charing Cross Hospital
- Sir Ravinder Nath Maini (expert on Rheumatology) Kennedy Institute/Charing Cross Hospital
- Christine Moffatt (nurse in leg ulcer care) Charing Cross Hospital
- Albert Neuberger (chemical pathologist) St Mary's Hospital
- William Kitchen Parker (physician and zoologist) Charing Cross Hospital
- Sir William Stanley Peart (Buchanan Medalist) St Mary's Hospital
- Dame Julia Polak (tissue engineer)
- Sir Rodney Robert Porter (Nobel Laureate, Physiology and Medicine)
- Lady Ann Redgrave (orthopaedic surgery, ex Chief Medical Officer of GB Rowing) Charing Cross Hospital
- Sir Bernard Spilsbury (pathologist and one of the pioneers of modern forensic medicine)
- Baroness Edith Summerskill (Politician) Charing Cross Hospital
- Joseph Toynbee (otologist) St Mary's Hospital
- Augustus Waller (the invention of the electrocardiogram (ECG))
- Professor Stephen Westaby (Pioneer in Cardiothoracic Surgery and Bioengineering)
- Sir Almroth Wright (advanced vaccination through the use of autogenous vaccines) St Mary's Hospital
- ProfessorPhilip Poole-Wilson, 1943-2009, McKenzie medal, pioneer of modern cardiology
- Sir Magdi Yacoub (expert cardiothoracic surgeon)
- Sir Roger Bannister (neurologist, runner of the first four-minute mile) St Mary's Hospital
- Jane Yardley, (author) Charing Cross Hospital
- Adam Kay, writer and comedian
