= Charing Cross and Westminster Medical School =

Coordinates: 51.4872°N 0.2202°W

- Type: Medical school
- Established: 1818 (Charing Cross Hospital Medical School); 1834 (Westminster Hospital Medical School); 1984 (Charing Cross and Westminster Medical School); 1997 (Imperial College School of Medicine)
- Affiliations: Imperial College London Charing Cross Hospital
- Location: London, England

Charing Cross and Westminster Medical School existed as a legal entity for 13 years, as the midpoint of a series of mergers which strategically consolidated the many small medical schools in west London into one large institution under the aegis of Imperial College London.

In 1984, Charing Cross Hospital Medical School and Westminster Hospital Medical School merged to form the Charing Cross and Westminster Medical School. This move was part of a series of mergers in the London medical schools in the early 1980s, which foreshadowed the second, larger round of mergers in the late 1990s.

Based at the Charing Cross Hospital site in Hammersmith and Chelsea and Westminster Hospital in Chelsea, the new medical school took the form of its larger precursor (CXHMS) in using "X" as an abbreviation for "Cross". The medical school also maintained academic units at the university hospitals of Queen Mary's Roehampton, West Middlesex, Ashford and Hillingdon.

In 1997, CXWMS merged with Imperial College, London (whose medical department was at St Mary's Hospital Medical School), The National Heart and Lung Institute and the Royal Postgraduate Medical School to form Imperial College School of Medicine.

== Student life ==
Students' Union based around the Reynolds Bar. CXWSU merged in Imperial College School of Medicine Students' Union in 1997.

== Deans ==
YEAR	DEAN	PRESIDENT
2000-1	Prof JMA Whitehouse	–
1999-0	Prof JMA Whitehouse	–
1998-9	Prof JMA Whitehouse	Wade Gayed
1997-8	Prof JMA Whitehouse	Nick Carter
1996-7	Prof RM Greenhalgh	–
1995-6	Prof RM Greenhalgh	Christina Dale
1994-5	Prof RM Greenhalgh	– Dwynwen Roberts
1993-4	Prof RM Greenhalgh	– Andy Carne
1992-3	Mr JEH Pendower	– Cliona Kirwan
1991-2	Mr JEH Pendower	– Stana Bojanic
1990-1	Mr JEH Pendower	– Eddie Strivens
1989-90	Mr JEH Pendower	– Roby Rakhit
1988-9	Professor Tony Glenister	– Abigail Samuels
1987-8	Professor Tony Glenister	–
1986-7	Professor Tony Glenister–	–
1985-6	Professor Tony Glenister	–
1984-5	–	–

== Notable alumni ==
- Mark Porter - The Times and Radio 4 doctor
- Dawn Harper - Embarrassing Bodies on Channel 4
- Fintan Coyle - Presenter of Speakeasy and inventor of "The Weakest Link"
