= Westminster Hospital Medical School =

Medical school in London, England

Coordinates: 51.5003°N 0.1291°W

- Type: Medical school
- Established: 1834 (Westminster Hospital Medical School); 1984 (Charing Cross and Westminster Medical School); 1997 (Imperial College School of Medicine)
- Affiliations: Imperial College London
- Location: London, England

The Westminster Hospital Medical School was one of the constituent medical schools of Imperial College School of Medicine. It was formally founded in 1834 by George Guthrie, an ex-military surgeon – although students had been taken on at Westminster Hospital almost from the hospital's foundation in 1719.

The hospital and medical school moved to larger buildings several times in the decades that followed, leading to conflict among the staff on several occasions. Guthrie's forceful urgings on retaining the location of the hospital and school on one occasion resulted in an argument climaxing in a pistol duel between two surgeons (though each missed each other).

One early Westminster student was John Snow, later the founder of modern epidemiology.

In 1905, the teaching of pre-clinical subjects ended at Westminster, and moved to King's College. The school was taken over by the army in 1914 to train pathologists for the war effort. Student numbers and the school suffered as a result, and it was only after 1920 that numbers improved.

In 1984, Westminster Hospital Medical School merged with local rivals Charing Cross Hospital Medical School to form Charing Cross and Westminster Medical School. This move was part of a general series of mergers in the London medical schools in the early 1980s. Westminster Hospital moved to the site of St Stephen's Hospital on Fulham Road in Chelsea in 1993, and changed its name to Chelsea and Westminster Hospital. In 1997, CXWMS merged with the National Heart and Lung Institute at the Royal Brompton Hospital, and Imperial College London, whose medical department was St Mary's Hospital Medical School. The new institution was called Imperial College School of Medicine, and was at the time the largest medical school in the UK.

== Shrove Tuesday Final Year Dinner ==
The Shrove Tuesday Dinner started in 1940 during the Blitz at the old Westminster Hospital. Students and house staff decided to have dinner to alleviate the oppressive mood. A senior member of staff was invited to address the assembled doctors and whilst he was talking a caricature was sketched on the tablecloth by one of his audience. It was cut out, passed round, signed and mounted and started the unbroken tradition that has evolved into the Shrove Tuesday Final Year Dinner.

Since 1997, the Shrove Tuesday Final Year Dinner has since been a fully student-led event run by the Imperial College School of Medicine Students' Union.

== Peter Albert Emerson ==
Peter Albert Emerson (born 7 February 1923) is a retired consultant physician who was perhaps best known as the last Dean of the Westminster Hospital Medical School; he was in post from 1981 to 1984. He was educated at The Leys School, Clare College, Cambridge, and St George's, University of London. He was an assistant professor of medicine at the State University of New York from 1957 to 1958.

=== Publications ===
- Emerson, Peter (16 April 2019). A DOCTOR'S LUCKY LIFE: Secrets from Seven Decades of Clinical Practice. Self-published. ISBN 9781092320405.A Doctor's Lucky Life (2019)
- Emerson, Peter (2016). Heart Hunters V3. Anna Stothard (illustrator). CreateSpace Independent Publishing Platform. ISBN 9781523988020.
- Emerson, Peter, ed. (1981). Thoracic Medicine. London: Butterworths.

== Bibliography ==
- https://www.union.ic.ac.uk/medic/stfyd/history/
