= Benjamin Golding =

British physician

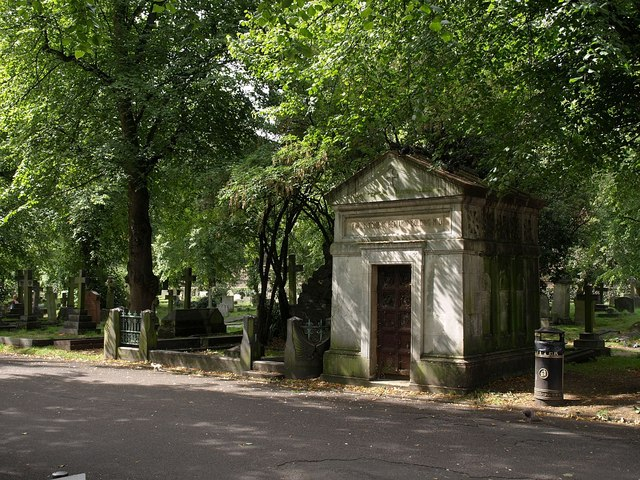
Benjamin Golding's tomb, Brompton Cemetery

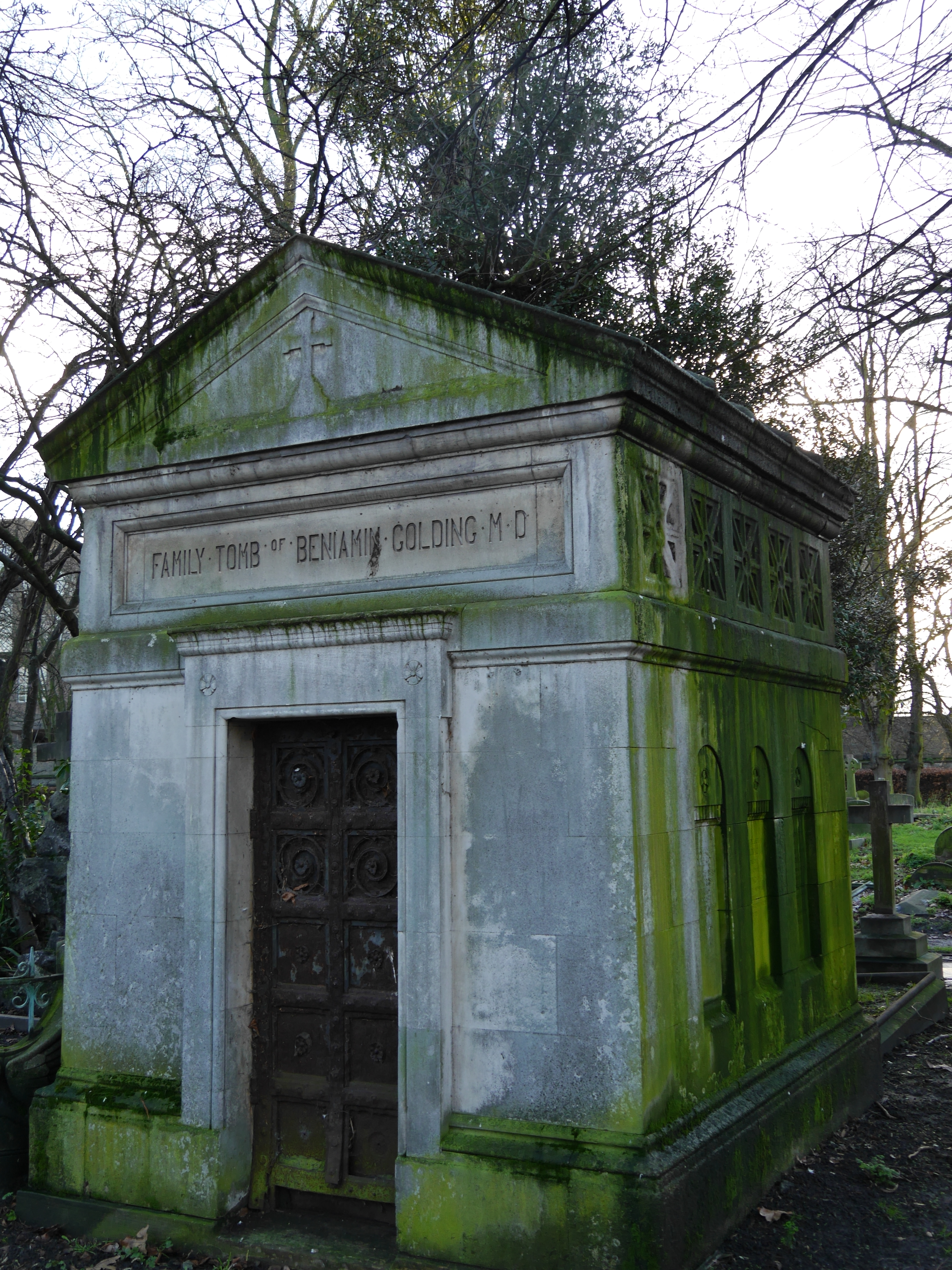
Benjamin Golding's tomb, Brompton Cemetery

Benjamin Golding (7 September 1793 – 21 June 1863) was a British medical doctor and the founder of the West London Infirmary which later became the Charing Cross Hospital. He wrote the history of that hospital and of St. Thomas's Hospital, originally in Southwark. He was known for his dedication to serving the poor.

== Early life and family ==
Benjamin Golding was born on 7 September 1793 in the town of St Osyth in Essex, England. He was the youngest son of the sixteen children of John Golding (1766–1831), a well-off tanner and landowner. Only eight of his father's 16 children lived into adulthood. He enrolled at the University of Edinburgh in 1811, where he attended the lectures of Dr James Gregory, and in 1813 started as a medical student at St Thomas' Hospital, London. Also in 1813 he received his MD from the University of St Andrews where degrees could be awarded from written testimonials.

In 1822, Golding married Sarah Pelerin Blew (1799–1873), a member of the family that owned Bayley & Blew, who among other things were perfumiers. They had nine children but several did not survive to adulthood.

== Medical career ==
Golding began medical practice in 1815 at his house in Leicester Place, City of Westminster, which was open particularly to the poor. It was at this time that he conceived the idea of a medical school being integral to a hospital, to ensure the needy were cared for in the present and future.

In 1820, he published the Historical Account of the Origin and Progress of St. Thomas's Hospital, Southwark, a topic he was devoted to for much of his life. By 1822, he had drafted his medical education plans.

Golding gave particular attention to the sick poor in the district of Charing Cross in central London. With public support and help from friends, they raised over £6,000 and founded the West London Infirmary in Villiers Street in 1823. On 4 June 1825 he gained a licentiate of the College of Physicians. By the early 1830s and at a cost of about £20,000, they established the Charing Cross Hospital.

He remained active in the hospital councils and in the management of hospital affairs until his attendance became less frequent towards the end of his life.

== Death and legacy ==
Golding died on 21 June 1863 in West Brompton at age 63. He is buried at Brompton Cemetery, London. His tomb is a grade II listed monument with Historic England.

== Selected works ==
- Burns and Scalds. 1814.
- An Historical Account of the Origin and Progress of St. Thomas's Hospital, Southwark. Longman, Hurst, Rees, Orme, & Brown, London, 1819.
- The Origin, Plan, and Operations of the Charing Cross Hospital. Allen & Co., London, 1867. Edited by his son George B. Golding.
