= Jane Yardley =

English author

Jane Yardley is an English author, raised in a village in 1960s Essex, (where most of her novels are set). She went to university in London and gained a Ph.D. degree from Charing Cross Hospital Medical School. Although living in London she spends much of her time travelling around the world co-ordinating medical trials for a small Japanese pharmaceutical company, indeed she says that her first novel Painting Ruby Tuesday (2003) was written on aeroplanes. It concerns ten-year-old Angharad (Annie) Craddock, whose neighbours are being brutally murdered; including Mrs. Clitheroe who shared Annies love of music and her synaesthesia, as Annie puts it "We see things in colour that aren’t. Not just music. Numbers. Letters. Days of the week. People’s names". Jane Yardley herself experiences synaesthesia and it inspired her to write the book.

Her novel Dancing with Dr Kildare was published by Doubleday on 2 January 2008.

== Bibliography ==
- Painting Ruby Tuesday (2003)
- Rainy Day Women (2004)
- A Saucerful of Secrets (2005)
- Dancing with Dr Kildare (2008)
