= Doctors to Be: 20 Years On =

- Genre: Biographical documentary
- Country of origin: United Kingdom
- Original language: English

Production
- Production locations: London, England
- Production company: BBC

Original release
- Network: BBC Four

Related
- Doctors to Be

Doctors to Be: 20 Years On is a biographical documentary series first broadcast on BBC Four by the BBC in 2007. It is a sequel to the series about ten medical students Doctors to Be, and gives an update on the careers and lives of the same people after they had qualified.

== Participants ==
- David Copping – He is a practicing GP.
- Mark George – He is a practicing colorectal surgeon and is married with children.
- Will Liddell – He is a GP, now semi-retired, who runs a farm and a campsite.
- Sarah Martindale – She spent several years in Australia and is a consultant anaesthetist.
- Jane Morris – She left medicine to raise her daughters and is now an agony aunt and healthcare advocate.
- Fey Probst – Now an A&E consultant, she is still practicing medicine and is a grandmother
- Ese Stacey – She is in private practice, primarily in sports medicine.
- Nick Hollings – He is a consultant Radiologist
