= Christine Moffatt =

British nursing academic

Christine Moffatt, CBE, FRCN, is a British nurse and educator.

== Biography ==
Moffatt was created a Commander of the Order of the British Empire in the 2006 New Year's Honours list by Queen Elizabeth II and was made a Fellow of the Royal College of Nursing in the same year.

She is a patron of The Leg Club. She holds visiting chairs at the University of Glasgow, Cardiff University Medical School Wound Healing Institute; Kanazawa University, Western Ontario University, and LOROS Hospice.
