= Charing Cross Hospital =

- Imperial College Healthcare NHS Trust
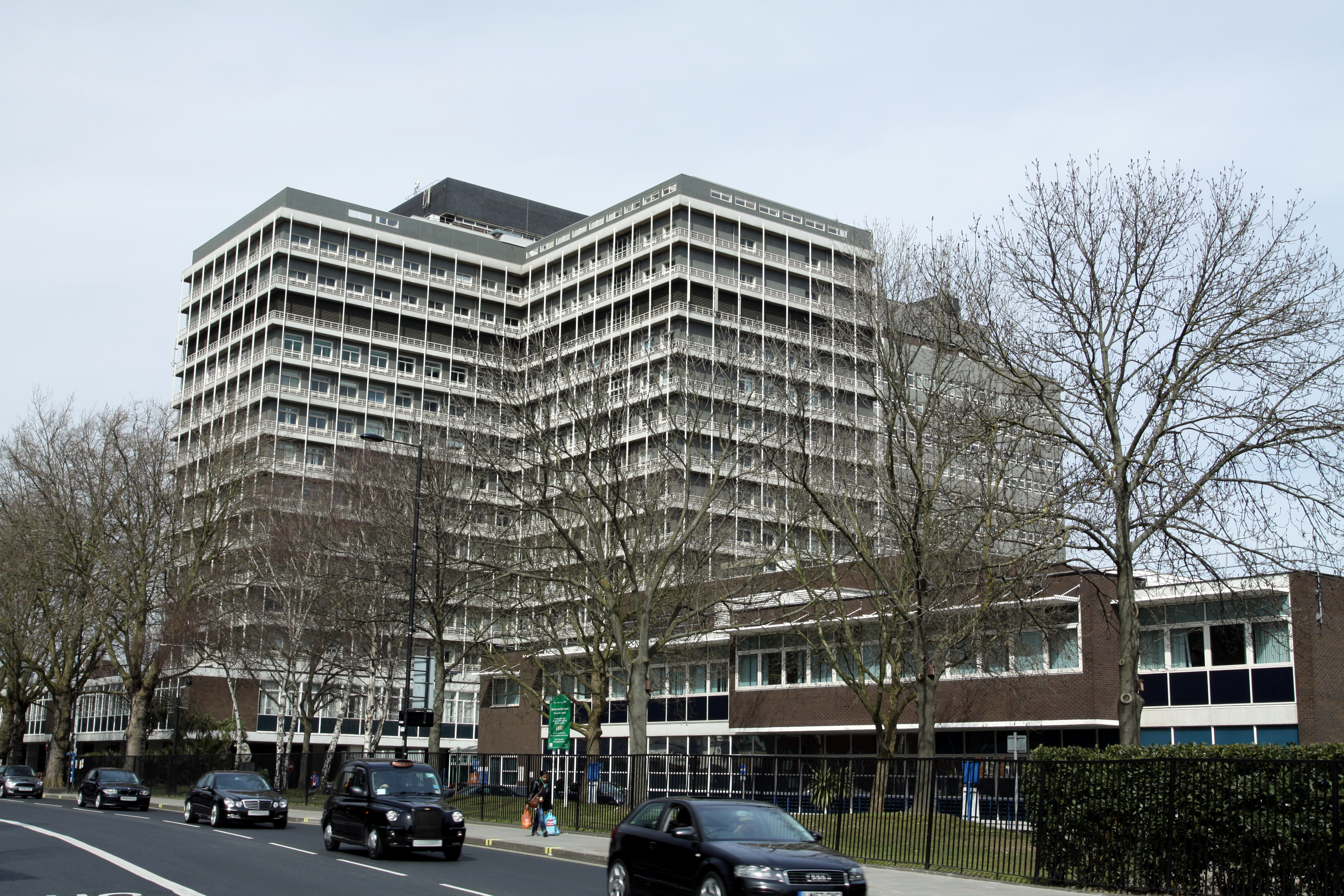
- The hospital in 2013

- Location within Hammersmith and Fulham

Geography
- Location: Hammersmith, London, England
- Coordinates: 51.4871°N 0.2195°W

Organisation
- Care system: National Health Service
- Type: Teaching
- Affiliated university: Imperial College School of Medicine

Services
- Emergency department: Yes
- Beds: 511

History
- Founded: 1818; 208 years ago (as the West London Infirmary, renamed Charing Cross in 1827)

Links
- Website: www.imperial.nhs.uk/our-locations/charing-cross-hospital

Charing Cross Hospital is district general hospital and teaching hospital located in Hammersmith in the London Borough of Hammersmith and Fulham. The present hospital was opened in 1973, although it was originally established in 1818, approximately five miles east, in central London.

It is part of Imperial College Healthcare NHS Trust and is the primary teaching hospital of the Imperial College School of Medicine. It is a tertiary referral centre for neurosurgery, and is a national centre of excellence for gestational trophoblastic disease. It currently houses the serious injuries centre for West London. In recent times, the hospital has pioneered the clinical use of CT scanning.

The hospital is host to the West London Neuroscience Centre. In addition, a day surgery unit, the Riverside Wing, was recently added. The West London Mental Health NHS Trust also has buildings on site. The hospital previously hosted the largest and oldest gender identity clinic in the country, with 150 operations performed annually. However this service was discontinued on 1 October 2021 as the hospital no longer had any surgeons with the required specialist skills.

== History ==
=== 19th century ===
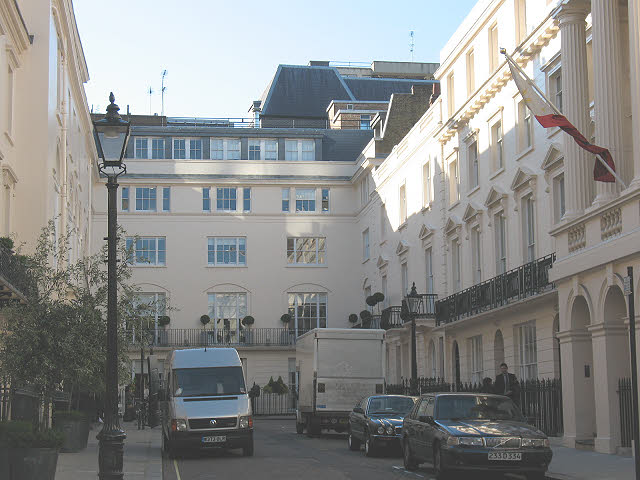
Suffolk Street, Westminster, the home of the hospital from 1818 to 1821

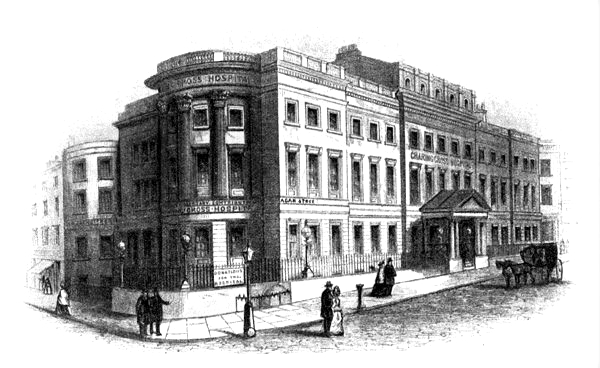
Charing Cross Hospital in Agar Street, Westminster, the home of the hospital from 1834 to 1973

In 1818, Dr. Benjamin Golding established the 'West London Infirmary and Dispensary' at 16 Suffolk Street, behind the Haymarket Theatre. The infirmary had been the dream of Dr. Golding, who wanted to establish a place of healing for the poor. The then Duke of York and Albany was asked to become patron; he accepted, and the hospital was thenceforth known as the Royal West London Infirmary. Following this, the then-Duchess of York and Albany and Duke of Cambridge also became patrons.

In 1821, the infirmary was reaching capacity, treating nearly 10,000 patients a year, so a new site was found, at 28 Villiers Street, near Charing Cross in the heart of the metropolis. The infirmary had room for twelve beds. Shortly afterwards, a plan was put in place to establish a medical school alongside the infirmary. Over the years, the list of benefactors and patrons grew, including many from the royal family.

In 1827, the name of the Royal West London Infirmary was changed to the more appropriate 'Charing Cross Hospital'. Plans were drawn up by architect Decimus Burton in 1830 and a site was found, just off the Strand (at what is today Agar Street). On 15 September 1831 the foundation stone was laid by the Duke of Sussex. The first completed ward was named after the daughter of the Duchess of Kent, Princess Victoria, who eventually became Queen Victoria. The principal ward for men was named Golding Ward, after the founder. The hospital itself was completed in January 1834, at a total cost of £20,000, and in October of that year, the 22 medical students were transferred from Villiers Street to the new building.

The hospital and medical school continued to expand. When King's College London opened, it needed a medical school and offered Charing Cross a substantial amount of money to train their students. Dr Golding was opposed to the idea and in 1839, after several years of negotiation, King's College decided to set up their own medical school. During those years, the school saw difficult times, and the number of students enrolling plummeted. By 1840, faith in the school had been restored and the number of students increased dramatically; however, Dr. Golding suffered a stroke.

By 1854 the hospital was flourishing and the top floor, which had been left as an empty shell, was completed. In 1856 Dr. Golding retired as Director of Charing Cross Hospital Medical School. The hospital encountered hard times after several new hospitals, with larger medical schools, were established in central London. However, Charing Cross Hospital weathered the storm: in 1866 it had professional nursing staff, and the hospital was enlarged several times over the next few years – in fact, after a major rebuild in 1877 the hospital had doubled in size.

=== 20th century ===
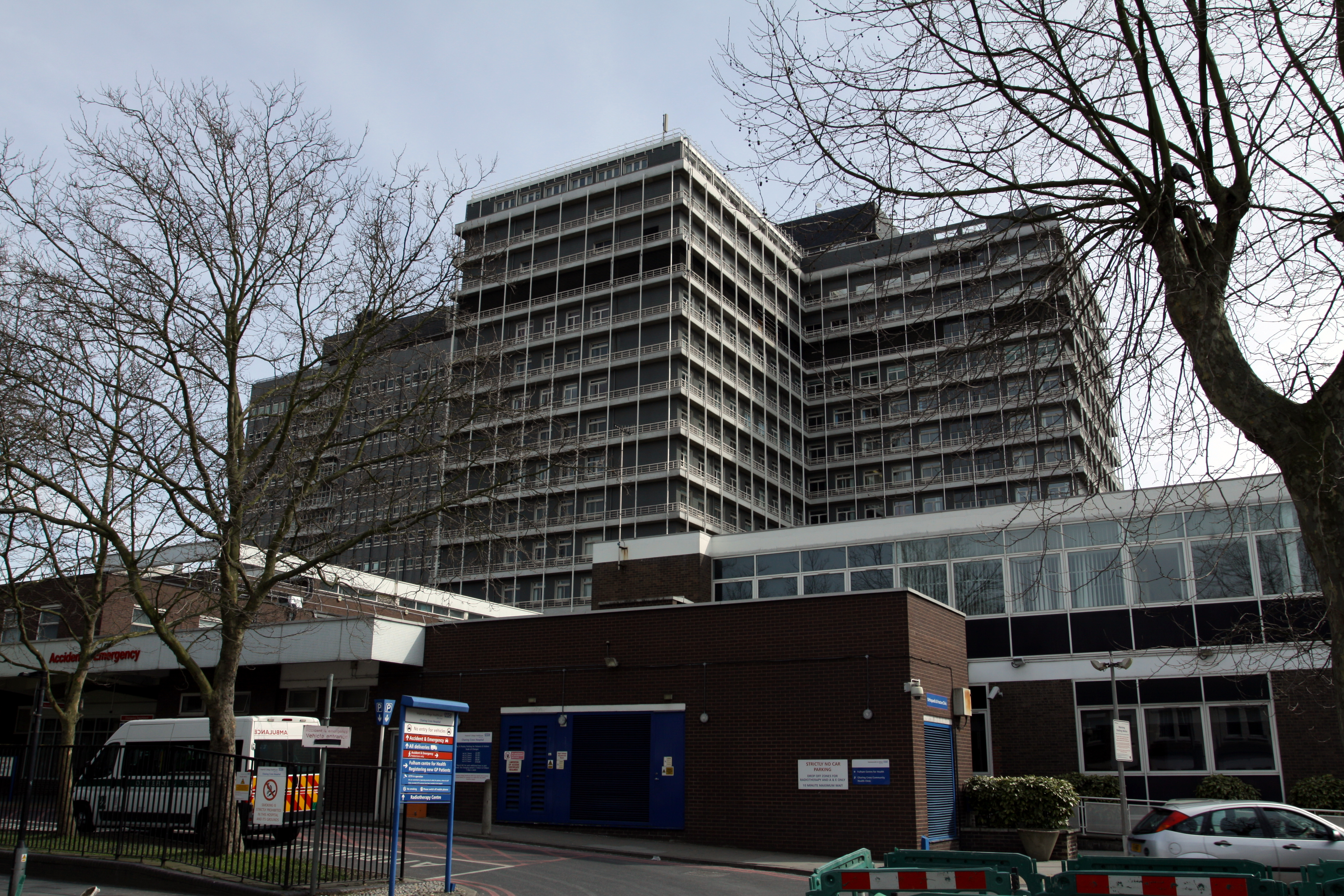
Accident and Emergency Department in Fulham Palace Road, which has been home to the hospital since 1973

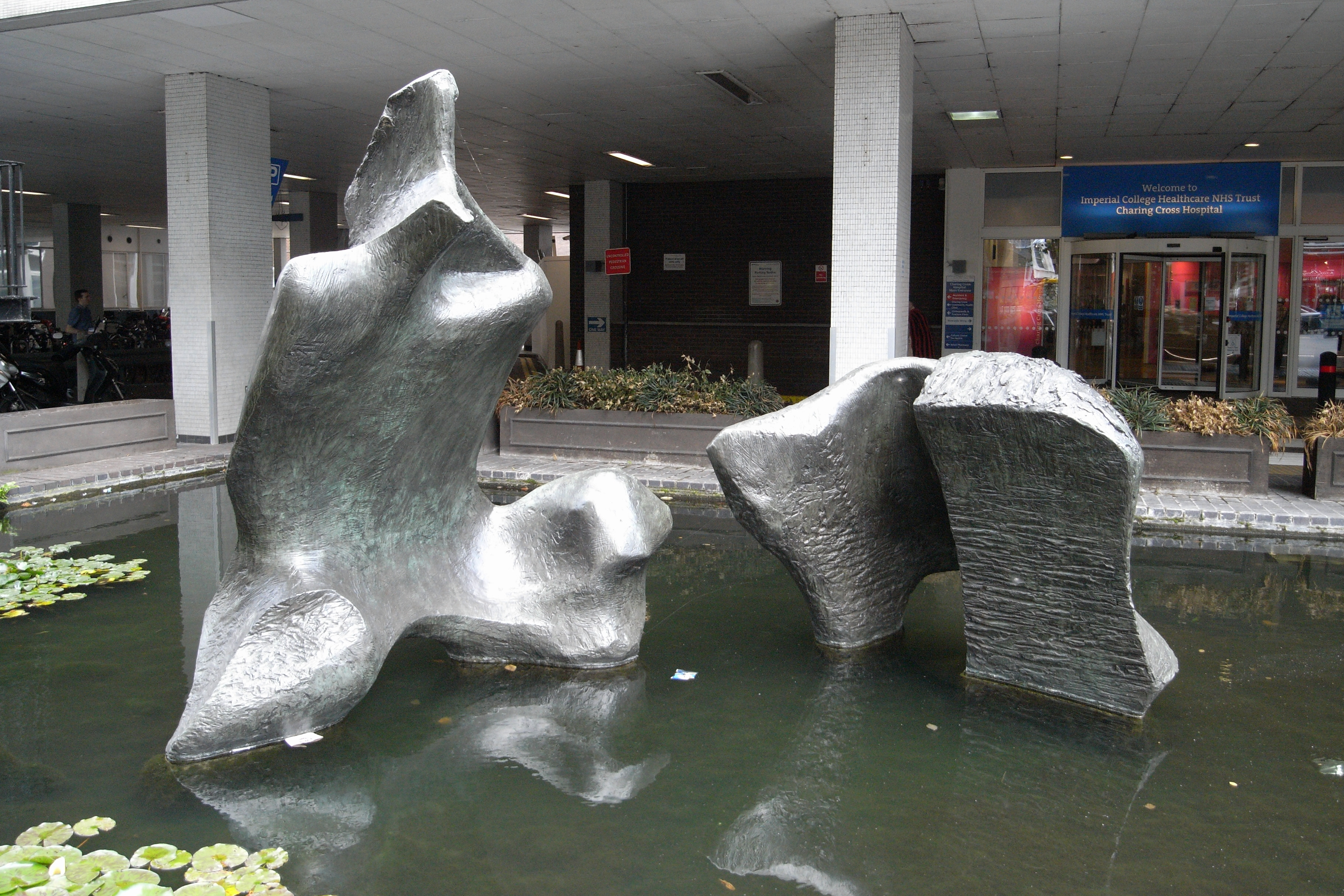
Henry Moore sculpture at the main entrance

The hospital was further extended in 1902. In 1926, the Royal Westminster Ophthalmic Hospital was merged with Charing Cross Hospital. With the advent of the Blitz in 1940, the hospital staff, students, equipment and patients were moved to Chaulden House, Boxmoor, Hertfordshire. In 1947, the hospital moved back to Charing Cross.

After the Second World War it was decided to relocate the hospital away from central London. Several sites were considered including a large site at Northwick Park in Harrow. However, the University of London deemed that they would not be able to remain affiliated with the hospital should it move there, and the site was handed over to the Ministry of Health, who developed it into the present Northwick Park Hospital.

In 1957 a link was proposed with Fulham and West London Hospitals. The proposal was controversial, as the residents of Fulham wanted their existing hospital to be redeveloped not taken over. A public meeting was set up with the Mayor of Fulham, and the Chairman of the hospital, Lord Inman, explained that the decision was made by the Ministry of Health, and that a new hospital would be well equipped and provide a full service. This allayed most people's fears, and the new Charing Cross Hospital, located on the site of the former Fulham Hospital, on Fulham Palace Road, was inaugurated by the Queen on 22 May 1973. The cost of building the new hospital was £15m—a staggering amount at the time. Designed by Ralph Tubbs, it consisted of a seventeen-storey building (15 floors for the hospital proper, with two machine floors above that) in the shape of a cross, along with several lower-level buildings. The design was notable for the lack of lifts to meet the capacity required to move patients around in their beds. Porters often waited 1–2 hours trying to get patients from wards to X-ray and back. Three high-rise residential blocks were built to house medical staff, nurses and medical students—called Golding, Parsons and Cliff houses, respectively. Despite the move, the hospital kept the name 'Charing Cross'; at first it was called 'Charing Cross Hospital, Fulham' but eventually the 'Fulham' part was dropped.

The Charing Cross Hospital building in Agar Street (a Grade II listed building since 1970) was converted for use in the 1990s and became Charing Cross Police Station.

=== Picture tiles ===
In 1978 seventeen murals of hand-painted picture tiles, probably dating from the 1890s, were removed from the old Charing Cross Hospital for restoration and preservation by skilled technicians from the Ironbridge Gorge Museum. Made by Maws of Jackfield they depicted rural and agricultural scenes and a medieval hunting scene. After restoration six panels were reinstalled in the new hospital building in 1979 while the remaining murals are in the collection of the Jackfield Tile Museum at Ironbridge Gorge.

=== Hospital chapel ===
On the ground floor of the south wing is the hospital chapel, which is integral to Tubbs' overall architectural scheme. It takes the form of an almost independently standing polygonal concrete tent formed from angled concrete ribs that spring from a ring beam under a deep timber clad ledge to meet at the centre of ceiling. The space between the walls and the roof is filled with glass allowing the ingress of continuous diffuse light.

Either side of the altar are two stained glass windows depicting Earthly Life and Heavenly Life, both designed by Alfred Fisher and installed in 1976. Either side of the entrance are two further stained glass windows designed by John Piper and manufactured by Patrick Reyntiens. Commissioned independently, the first – on the right – shows the River of Life and was installed in 1978. The second – depicting the Tree of Life – was installed in 1981.

== Gallery ==
The chapel and old hospital tile panel

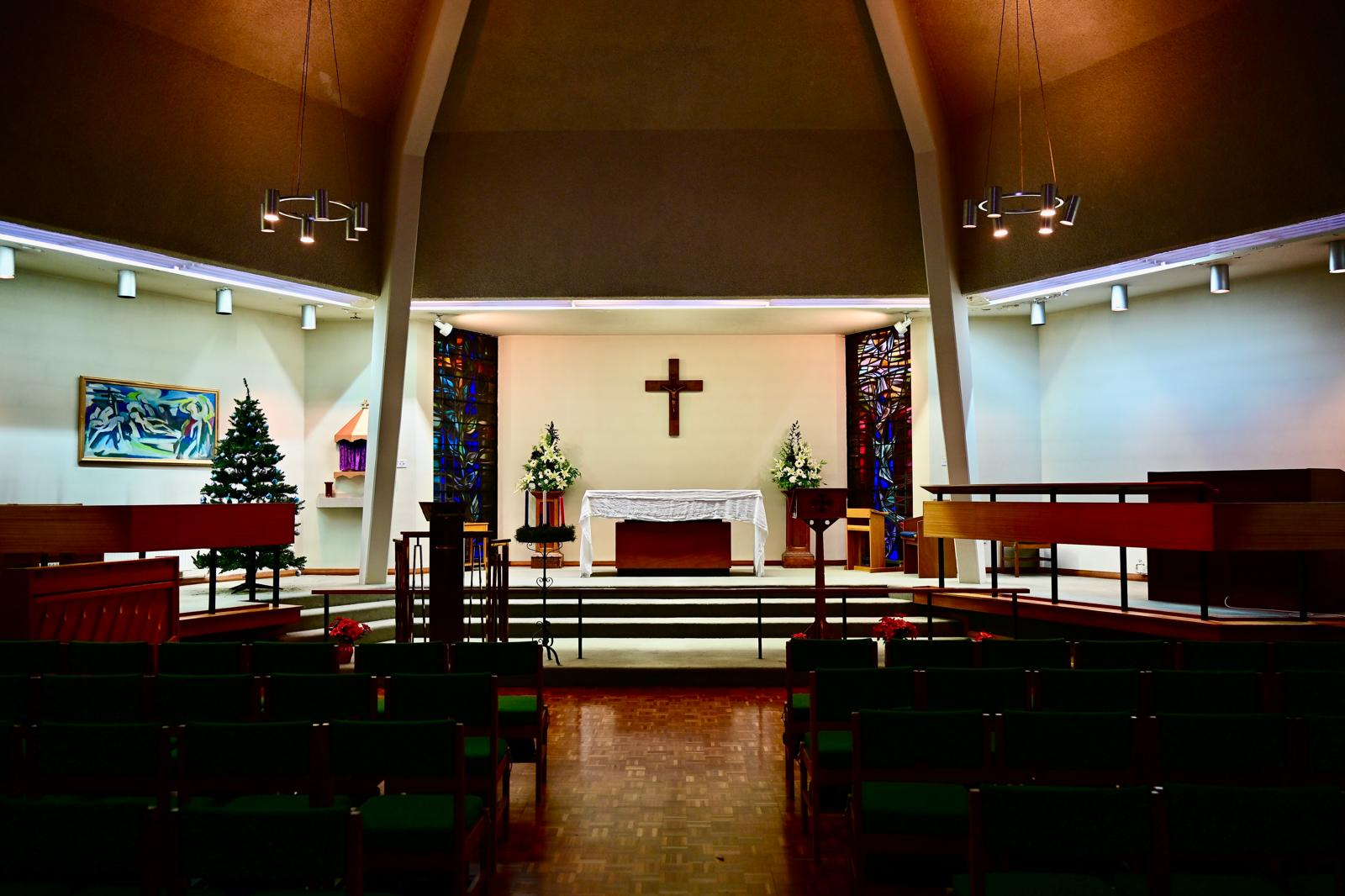
Chapel of Charing Cross Hospital

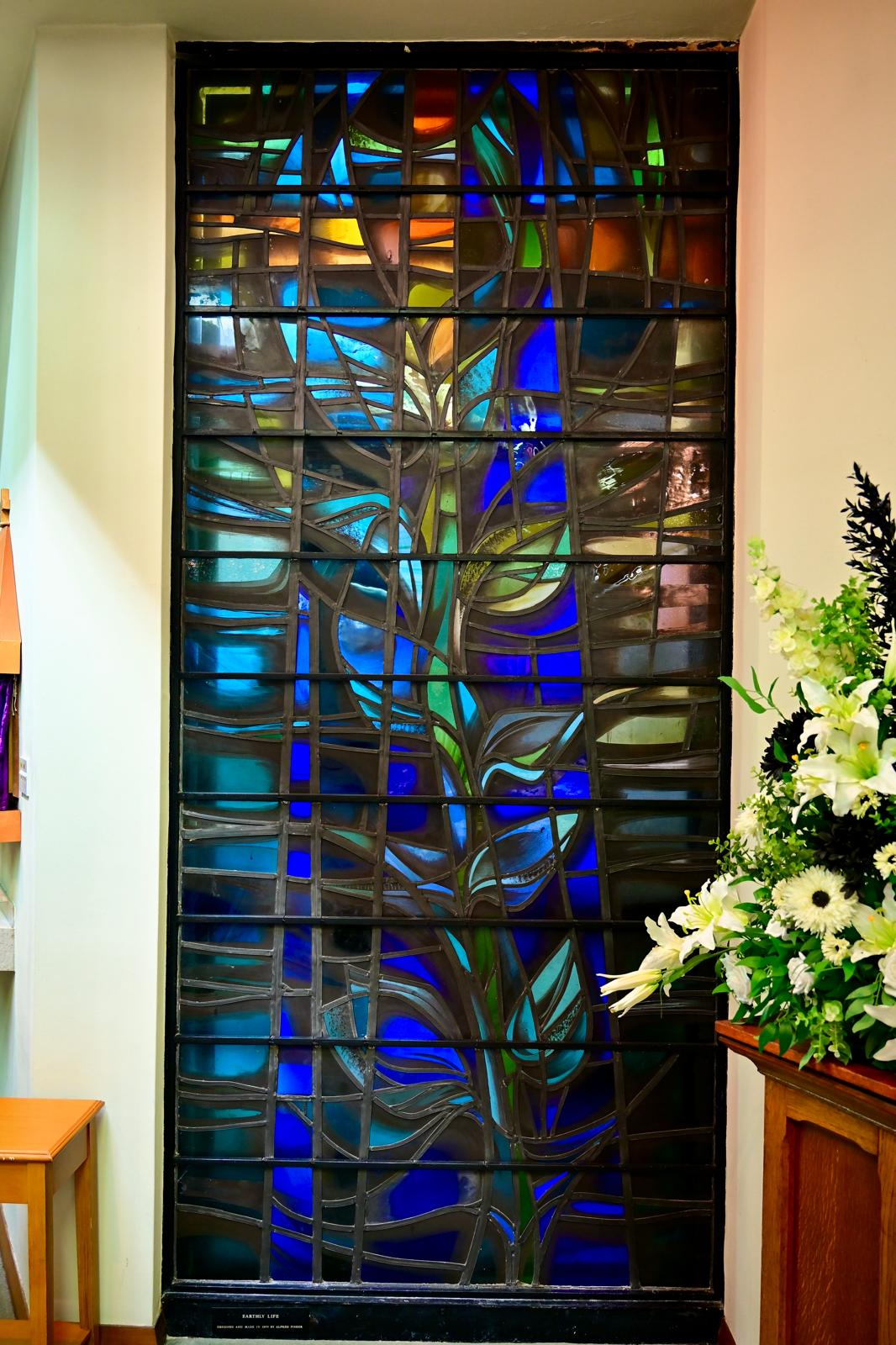
Earthly Life widow by Alfred Fisher, 1976

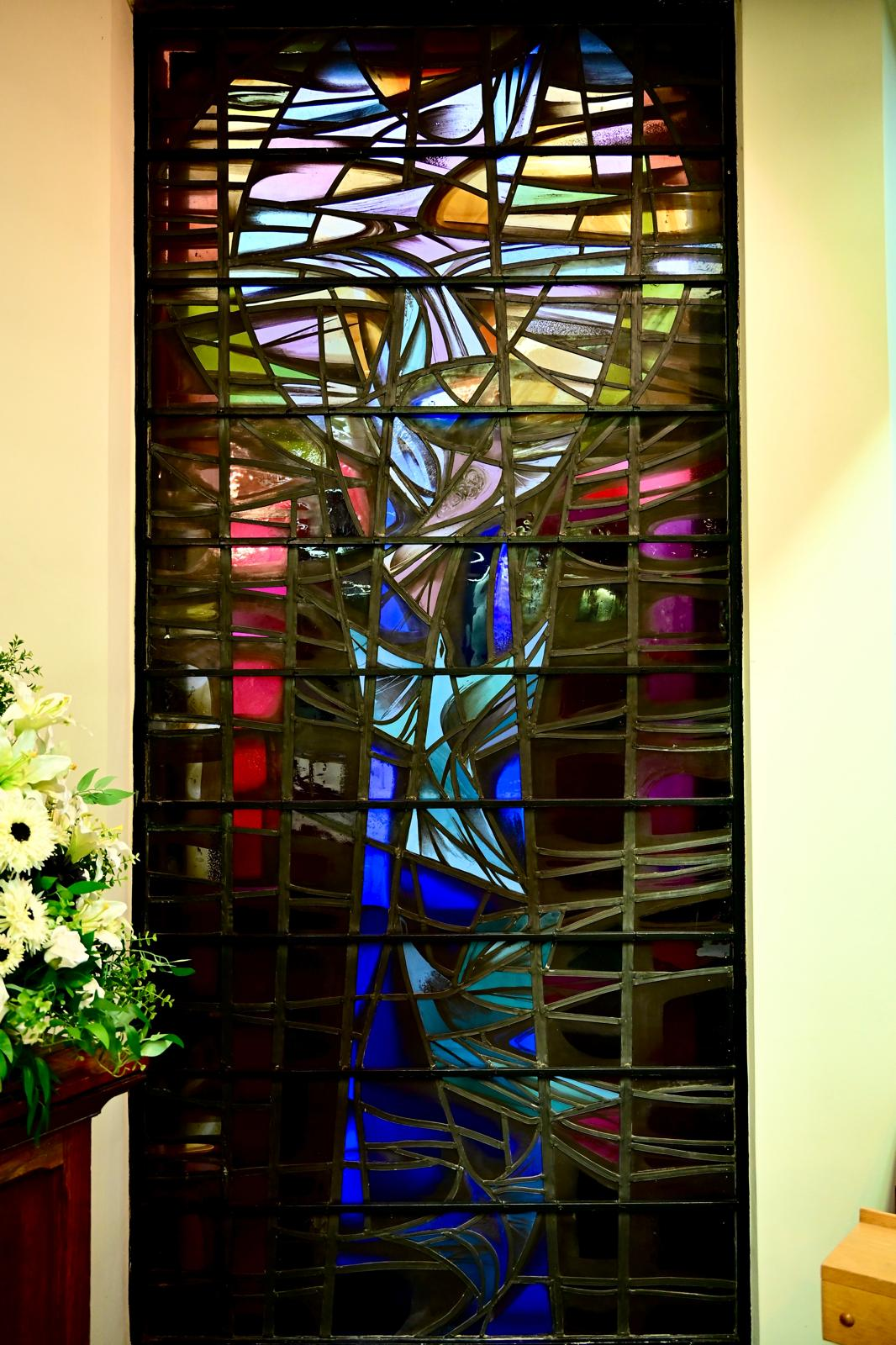
Heavenly Life window by Alfred Fisher, 1976

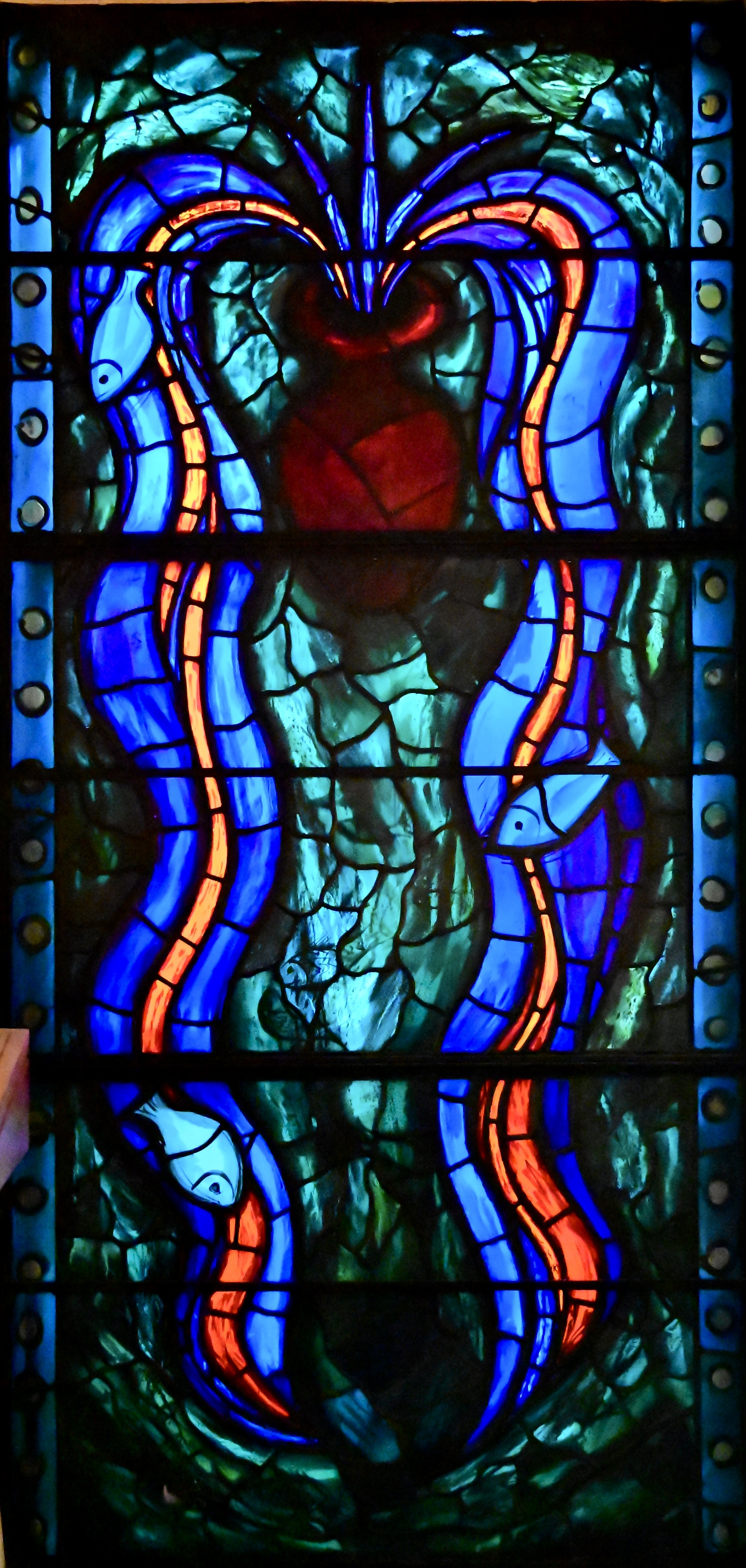
River of Life window by John Piper and Patrick Reyntiens, 1978

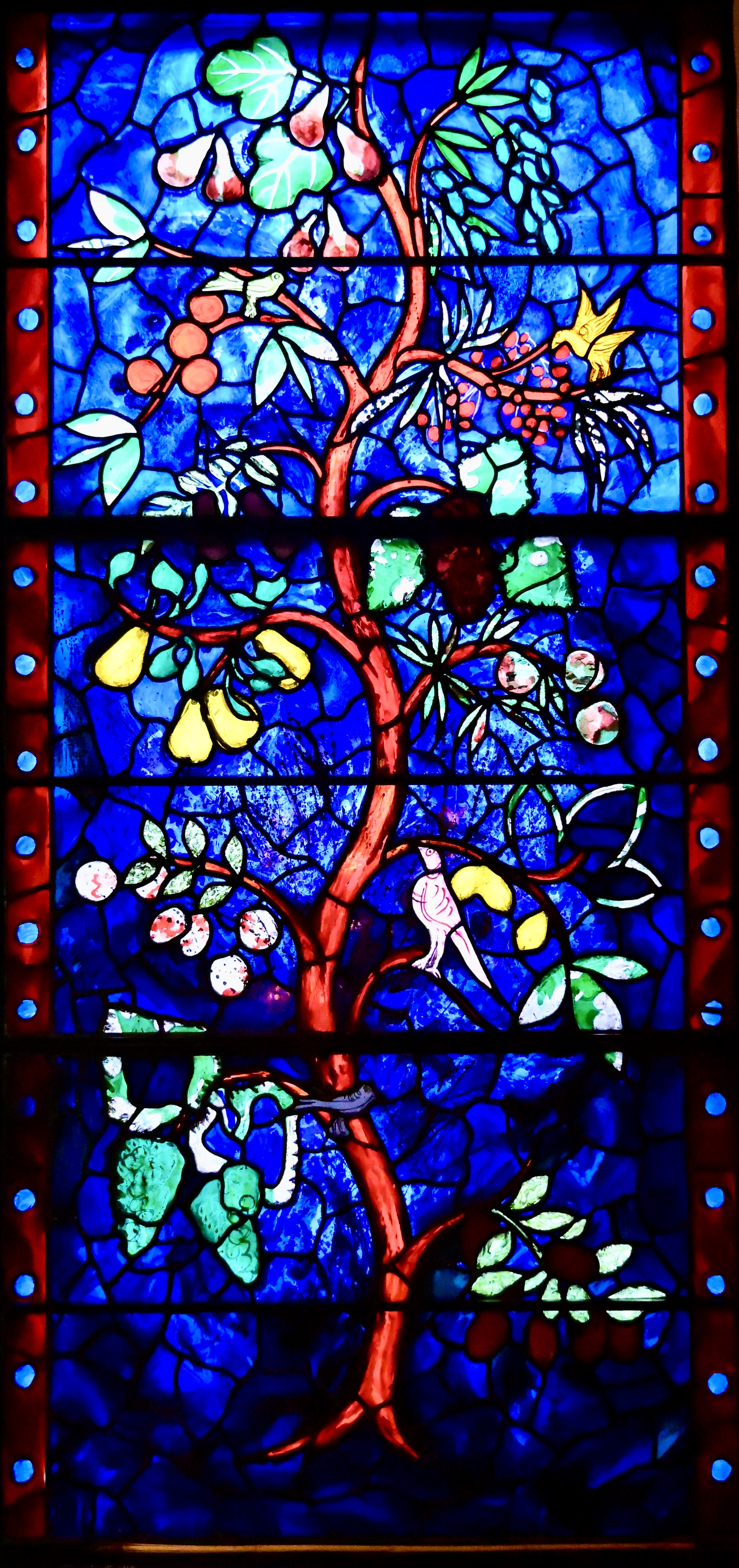
Tree of Life window by John Piper and Patrick Reyntiens, 1981

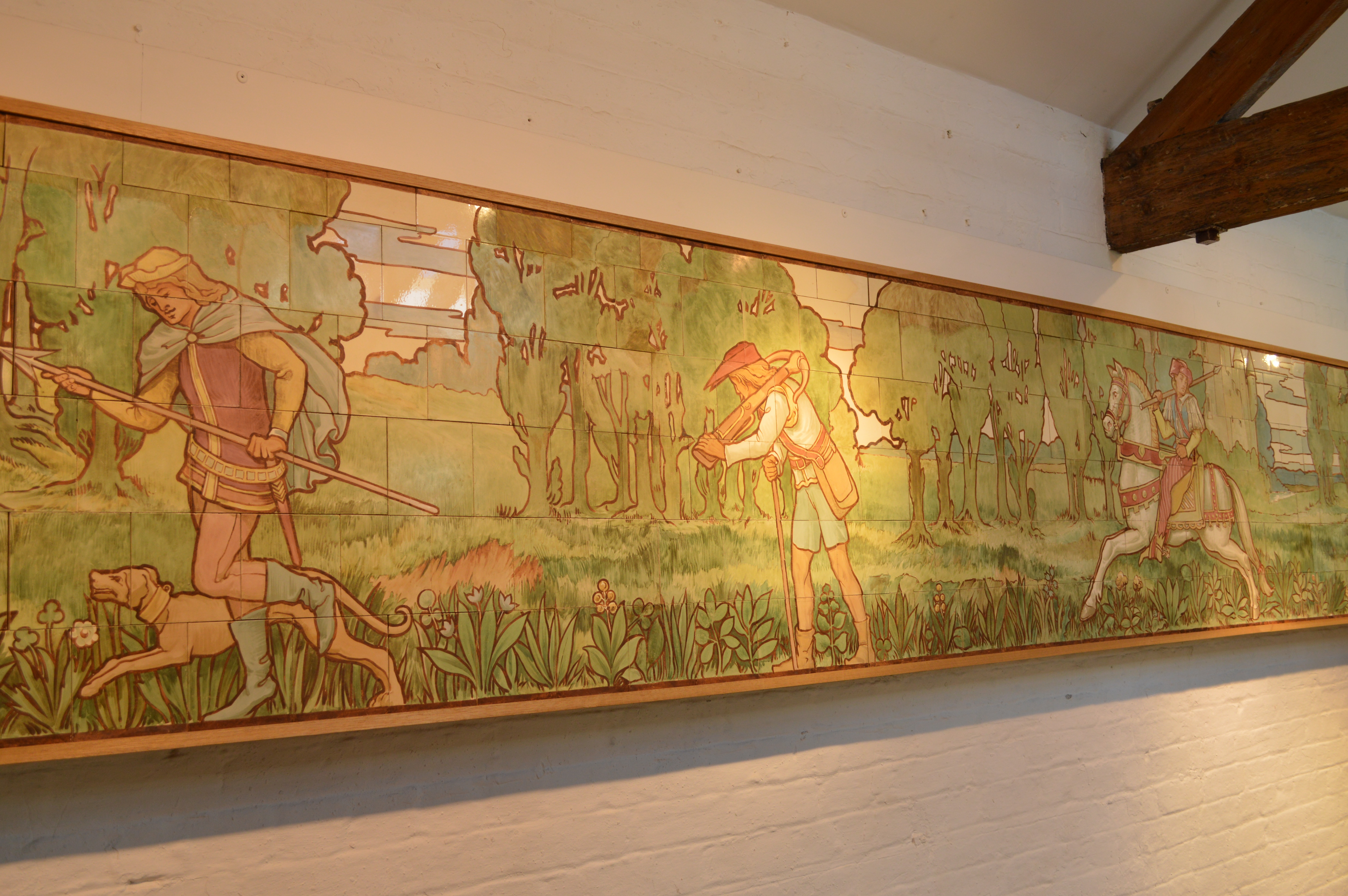
Hunting Scene from old Charing Cross Hospital (now in the Jackfield Tile Museum)

== Notable alumni ==
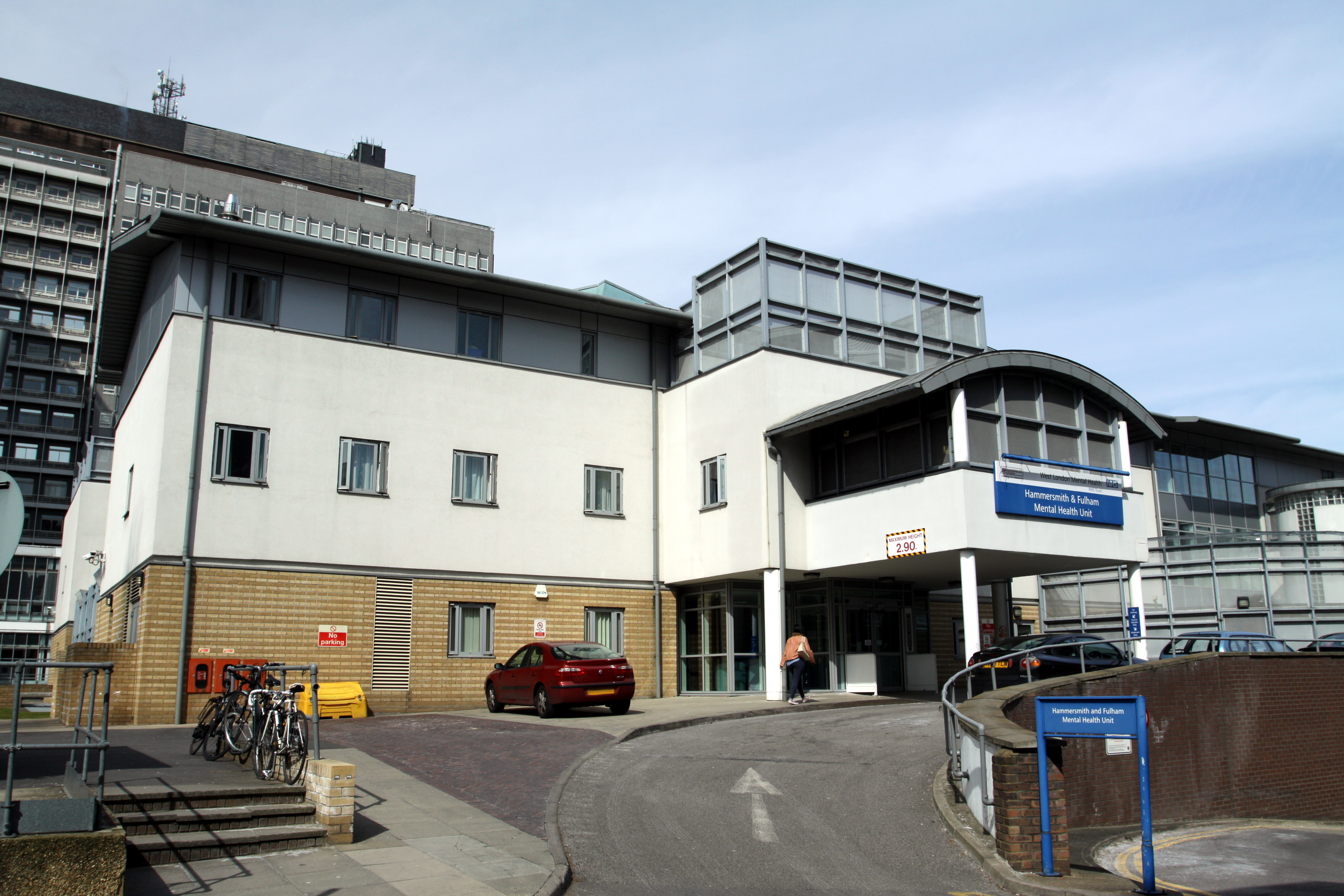
Mental Health Unit building

The following are notable alumni:

- David Livingstone, who qualified as a doctor at the hospital but went on to be a famous explorer.
- Thomas Huxley, who qualified as a doctor at the hospital and whose works include 'Zoological Evidences of Man's Place in Nature' and 'Evolution and Ethics'.
- John Astley Bloxam, a pioneering surgeon at the hospital who, according to the Royal College of Surgeons, "excelled in the plastic surgery necessary to repair the noses and lips of those who had been the subjects of syphilitic ulceration".
- Henry Hyde Salter, a physician at the hospital who extensively described Asthma.
- Viscount Addison, who worked at the hospital and is accredited with naming 'Addison's transpyloric plane', a part of the human body used as a surgical landmark.
- Herbert Barrie, a consultant paediatrician at the hospital who developed one of the first neonatal intensive care units in London and the country's first neonatal ambulance.

== Transport links ==
London Buses routes 190, 211, 220, 295 and night routes N11, N33, N72 and N97 serve the hospital.

== Medical school ==
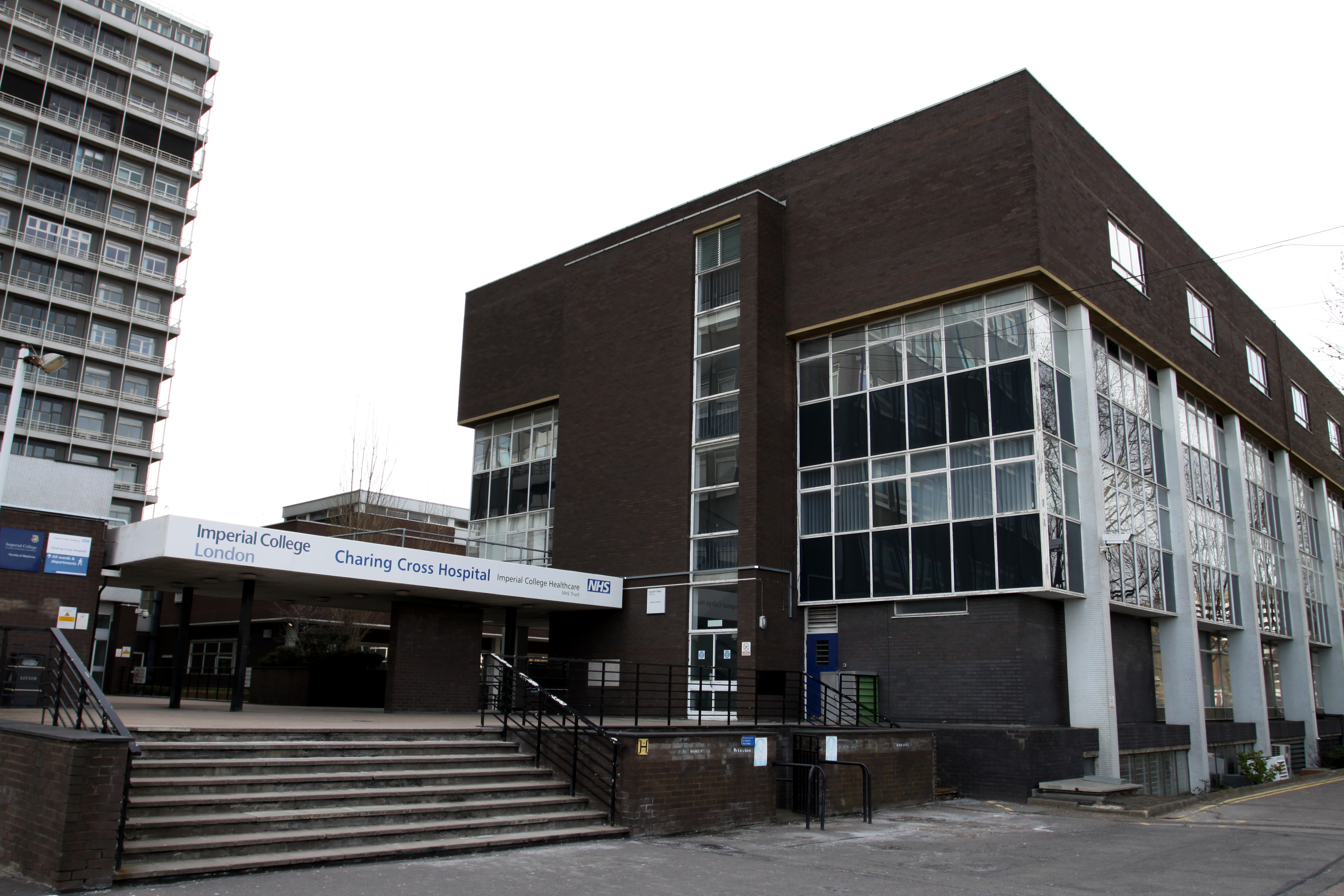
The Reynolds Building at the hospital

Charing Cross Hospital Medical School merged with Westminster Hospital Medical School to form Charing Cross and Westminster Medical School in 1984. Charing Cross and Westminster Medical School was itself integrated into Imperial College London in 1997. The Reynolds Building (built for Charing Cross and Westminster Medical School in 1976), lies adjacent to the hospital within the campus and is used extensively by Imperial College School of Medicine.

== Maggie's West London ==
On 29 April 2008, Maggie's Centre was opened by Nigella Lawson and Sarah Brown. This support centre is available for anyone who is affected by cancer in London. In 2009, the centre was visited by Michelle Obama and in October was given the 2009 Stirling Prize from the Royal Institute of British Architects.

== Notable people who have died at Charing Cross Hospital ==
- Naji al-Ali (c. 1938 - 29 August 1987) – Palestinian political cartoonist, best known for his character Handala. He was assassinated in 1987. He was shot in the neck and subsequently fell into a coma. He died five weeks later at Charing Cross Hospital, aged 48–49.
- Jill Dando (9 November 1961 – 26 April 1999) – BBC newsreader and TV presenter, best known for hosting Crimewatch and Holiday died upon arrival there at Charing Cross Hospital, after being fatally shot in Gowan Avenue, Fulham, aged 37.
- Geraldine McEwan (9 May 1932 – 30 January 2015) – actress who died at Charing Cross Hospital after suffering a stroke three months earlier, aged 82.
- Laura Sadler (25 December 1980 – 19 June 2003) – actress who died at Charing Cross Hospital after falling 40 feet from a balcony at her home in Holland Park, west London, four days previously, aged 22.
- Millie Small (6 October 1947 – 5 May 2020) – Jamaican singer internationally known for her 1964 hit My Boy Lollipop. Suffered a stroke at home and was taken to Charing Cross Hospital where she died after being taken off life support, aged 72.
