= St Mary's Hospital Medical School =

Former medical school in London, England

Coordinates: 51°31′3.3″N 0°10′23.8″W

- Type: Medical school
- Established: 1854 (St Mary's Hospital Medical School); 1988 (Merged with Imperial College London); 1997 (Imperial College School of Medicine)
- Affiliations: Imperial College London
- Location: London, England

St Mary's Hospital Medical School was the youngest of the constituent medical schools of Imperial College School of Medicine, founded in 1854 as part of the new hospital in Paddington. During its existence in the 1980s and 1990s, it was the most popular medical school in the country, with an application to place ratio of 27:1 in 1996.

St Mary's continued comparatively unmoved by the other nomadic medical schools in the area, until its merger with Imperial College in 1988, and the foundation of Imperial College School of Medicine in 1997 by the merger with Charing Cross and Westminster Medical School.

== Doctors to Be ==
Doctors to Be, a biographical documentary series first broadcast on BBC Two by BBC Television, followed 10 medical students who enrolled at St Mary's Hospital Medical School in the 1985 intake. It started with admission interviews in November 1984, then followed their lives as medical students for five or six years, and ended with their first experiences of working as busy junior hospital doctors in the National Health Service. A sequel Doctors to Be: 20 Years On was first broadcast on BBC Four in 2007 and provided an update on the careers and lives of the same people after they had qualified.

== Student life ==
St Mary's Hospital, London was traditionally regarded as the refuge of sons of Welsh farmers and miners arriving by train from nearby Paddington station. St Mary's Hospital Medical School thus developed a reputation for sporting prowess, with the rugby club actually predating the Rugby Football Union. The sporting traditions of Mary's are reflected with its alumni, such as the Welsh rugby captain J. P. R. Williams (commemorated in the annual ICSM vs. Imperial Varsity Rugby match, the J. P. R. Williams Cup); and Roger Bannister (commemorated in the annual ICSM vs. Imperial Varsity athletics meet), the first man to run a mile in under four minutes. The first woman to graduate from St Mary's Hospital was Jean Ginsburg in 1952.

St Mary's Hospital has an equally rich history in the arts. The dramatic society staged performances of operettas at Wilson House, London, which on occasion were graced with a royal visit and a performance from Princess Margaret. This royal association continued until recent times with the Queen Mother being the patron of the soirée – the post opera comedy night – until her death in 2002 (the post has remained unfilled following its failure to be won in the post-soirée raffle of the same year).

The student clubs of the hospital had many United Hospitals victories.

== St Mary's Swimming Pool ==
The swimming pool in the basement of the Medical school building was built in 1932. It was opened by the Queen Mother who was the royal patron of the pool. Sir Alexander Fleming became familiar with the water polo team's commendable sportsmanship, which influenced his decision to come to St Mary's from Scotland.

== Clubs and Societies ==
- St Mary's Hospital RFC
- St Mary's Water Polo Club

== Alumni ==
Graduates of St Mary's Hospital Medical School can join the St Mary's Association.

=== Notable alumni ===
- Roger Bannister – First man to run a four-minute mile, professor of neurology
- Air Vice-Marshal John Cooke - senior RAF officer and Dean of Air Force Medicine
- Ray Donnelly MBE - cardiothoracic surgeon and founder of the UK's only lung cancer charity
- Sir Alexander Fleming - Nobel Laureate, Physiology and Medicine, known for his discovery of penicillin at the hospital in 1928. The room in which the discovery took place is currently a museum at the hospital, open to the public.
- Jean Ginsburg - reproductive endocrinologist
- Air Vice-Marshal Frederick Charles Hurrell - Director-General of the RAF Medical Services from 1986 to 1988
- Harry Keen - diabetes expert
- Tommy Kemp - International rugby player
- Major General Frederick Mayes - Director General Army Medical Services from 1993 to 1996
- Doris Odlum - early psychiatrist
- Tuppy Owen-Smith – International rugby player and cricketer
- Augustus Rowe - Canadian physician and politician; Health Minister of Newfoundland and Labrador (1972-1975).
- Andrew Wakefield – instigator of the MMR vaccine controversy
- J. P. R. Williams – International rugby player
- Richard Tecwyn Williams - First Chair of Biochemistry at the medical school
- Charles Wilson, 1st Baron Moran - later college Dean and personal physician to Winston Churchill

== See also ==
- Timeline of Imperial College School of Medicine
