= List of people associated with Imperial College London =

This is a list of Imperial College London people, including notable students and staff from the various historical institutions which are now part of Imperial College. Students who later became academics at Imperial are listed in the alumni section only to avoid duplication.

== Science and engineering ==
- Bissan Al-Lazikani (data scientist)
- Sir Roy M. Anderson (epidemiology – mathematically modelled the spread of Creutzfeldt–Jakob disease and AIDS.)
- Dame Angela McLean (mathematical biologist)
- Sir Richard Peto (statistician and epidemiologist)
- Dame Mary Archer (British scientist specialising in solar power conversion)
- Eric Ashby, Baron Ashby (botanist)
- Sir Henry De la Beche, founder of the British Geological Survey
- William Thomas Blanford (geologist)
- Kenneth Binmore (economist)
- Moses Blackman (crystallographer)
- Sir Charles Vernon Boys (scientist)
- Donal Bradley (researcher in plastic electronics)
- Michael Broome (engineer and numismatist, founder of the Oriental Numismatic Society)
- Nessa Carey, virologist and author)
- George C. Clerk (Ghanaian botanist and plant pathologist)
- Piers Corbyn (meteorologist)
- Barbara H. Stuart (chemist)
- Donald Watts Davies (computer scientist)
- Sankar K. Pal (Padma Shri awardee computer scientist and former Director, Indian Statistical Institute), known for Soft Computing and Machine Intelligence
- Herbert Dingle (English astronomer, best known for his claimed disproof of the theory of special relativity)
- Patrick Dixon (futurist, physician)
- Sir Lewis Leigh Fermor (geologist, first president of Indian National Science Academy)
- Amanda Fisher (biologist)
- Alfred Fowler (astronomer)
- Marc Garneau (first Canadian in space, Chancellor of Carleton University, Liberal Member of Parliament)
- John F. Griffiths (climatologist)
- Guo Yike (computer scientist)
- Sir Thomas Henry Holland (geologist)
- Arthur Holmes (geologist)
- John Wesley Judd (geologist)
- David Latchman (geneticist)
- Sonya Legg (geologist)
- Kaveh Madani (environmental scientist, activist and former politician)
- Evelyne Isaack Mbede (geologist)
- Johnjoe McFadden (molecular geneticist and writer)
- C. Lloyd Morgan (psychologist)
- Naomi Oreskes (historian of science)
- Helen Porter (botanist)
- David E. Potter (founder and Chairman of Psion, Chairman of Symbian)
- John G. Ramsay (structural geologist)
- Santu Shahaney (Indian Ordnance Factories Service officer, served as the first Indian Director General of the Indian Ordnance Factories)
- Murray Shanahan (computer scientist)
- Dave Thomas (computer scientist)
- Leslie Valiant (theoretical computer scientist, best known for PAC Learning)
- Elsayed Elsayed Wagih (Egyptian virologist and biotechnologist)
- Dewang Mehta (Computer and IT professional)

=== Chemists ===
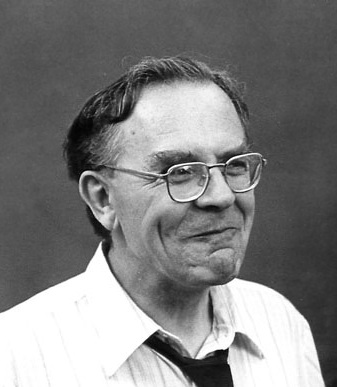
Geoffrey Wilkinson, Nobel laureate chemist

- Henry Edward Armstrong (chemist)
- Richard Barrer (chemistry – developer of zeolites)
- Anthony Barrett (Professor of Organic Chemistry at Imperial)
- Sir Derek Harold Richard Barton (Nobel laureate, chemistry)
- Dewan Singh Bhakuni (Indian chemist, Shanti Swarup Bhatnagar laureate)
- Geoffrey Charles Bratt (chemist and lichenologist)
- Sir William Crookes (chemist and physicist)
- Andrew deMello (chemist)
- Carl Djerassi (chemist; first oral contraceptive pill progestin norethisterone)
- George Finch
- Malcolm Green
- Christopher Kelk Ingold (of the Cahn-Ingold-Prelog rules)
- Adinath Lahiri (Padma Bhushan and Padma Shri awardee)
- Sir Patrick Linstead (discoverer of phthalocyanine dyes)
- Sir William Henry Perkin (discoverer of aniline dyes, studied at the Royal College of Chemistry)
- William Henry Perkin, Jr. (organic chemist, son of Sir William Henry Perkin, studied at the Royal College of Science)
- Juda Hirsch Quastel (chemist)
- Henry Rzepa (computational organic chemist)
- Jeremy Sanders (chemist)
- Martin Schroder (chemist)
- Sir Richard Sykes (biochemist, Chairman of GlaxoSmithKline)
- Sir Henry Tizard (Chemist and inventor)
- Sir Geoffrey Wilkinson (Nobel laureate, chemistry)

=== Engineers ===
- Asad Abidi (electrical engineer) – former dean of Lahore University of Management Sciences, member of the National Academy of Engineering
- Roma Agrawal (structural engineer)
- Nicholas Ambraseys (civil engineer – Founder of Engineering Seismology at Imperial College London)
- Eric Ash (engineer)
- Sir Alec Skempton (founding father of soil mechanics)
- Ayodele Awojobi (first African awarded the D.Sc degree in mechanical engineering; main field: vibration)
- Cecil Balmond (civil engineer)
- Baron Richard Beeching (engineer)
- Alan Blumlein (electronic engineer)
- George E. Davis (engineer – regarded as the founding father of the discipline of chemical engineering)
- S. P. Chakravarti (electrical, electronic and telecommunications engineer, father of Electronics and Telecommunications engineering education in India)
- Wilfred Corrigan (American engineer and entrepreneur, founder of LSI Logic Corp.)
- Peter A. Cundall (rock engineer – Discrete Element Method)
- Brian Davies (engineer, developed the first medical robotic device to operate upon a human being)
- George Mercer Dawson (surveyor)
- James H. Ellis (engineer, conceived public-key cryptography)
- Sir Hugh Ford (engineer)
- Peter Gregson (research engineer, Vice-Chancellor of the Queen's University of Belfast)
- Dame Judith Hackitt (engineer and civil servant)
- Sir Harold Harding (civil engineer)
- Sir Stanley Hooker (mechanical engineer)
- C.L.V. Jayathilake (engineer)
- Viktor Jensen (engineer)
- Frederick William Lanchester (aeronautic engineer)
- Meir Manny Lehman (software engineering)
- Tshilidzi Marwala (engineer)
- Sanjoy K. Mitter (electrical engineer)
- Norbert Morgenstern (geotechnical engineer)
- Dudley Maurice Newitt, chemical engineer, scientific director of the Special Operations Executive;
- Suhas Patankar (mechanical engineer)
- Peter Rawlinson (mechanical engineer)
- Alec Reeves (engineer, invented pulse-code modulation)
- Peter Rice (civil engineer)
- Donald Van Norman Roberts (civil engineer)
- Roger W.H. Sargent (chemical engineer)
- Luís Simões da Silva (civil engineer)
- Josef Singer (1923–2009) (aeronautical engineer; Israeli President of Technion – Israel Institute of Technology
- Nikolas Tombazis (Mclaren F1 and Scuderia Ferrari chief aerodynamicist)
- Kevin Warwick (engineer)
- Andrew J. Whittle (head of Civil Engineering at MIT)
- Richard Williams, Vice-Chancellor of Heriot-Watt University
- Christopher R. Wronski (electrical engineer)
- Shao Xianghua (metallurgical engineer)
- Olgierd Zienkiewicz (civil engineer – Finite Element Method)

=== Mathematicians and statisticians ===
- Daniel Afedzi Akyeampong (mathematician)
- Francis Allotey (mathematician)
- David Balding (mathematical statistician)
- Vincent Blondel (mathematician)
- Kenneth Binmore (mathematician and economist)
- Tony Brooker (mathematician and computer scientist)
- William Reginald Dean (applied mathematician and fluid dynamicist)
- E. W. Hobson (mathematician)
- Bill Parry (mathematician)
- L H C Tippett (statistician)
- Stuart Turnbull (financial mathematician)

=== Medicine ===
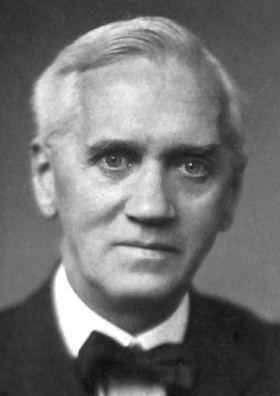
Sir Alexander Fleming

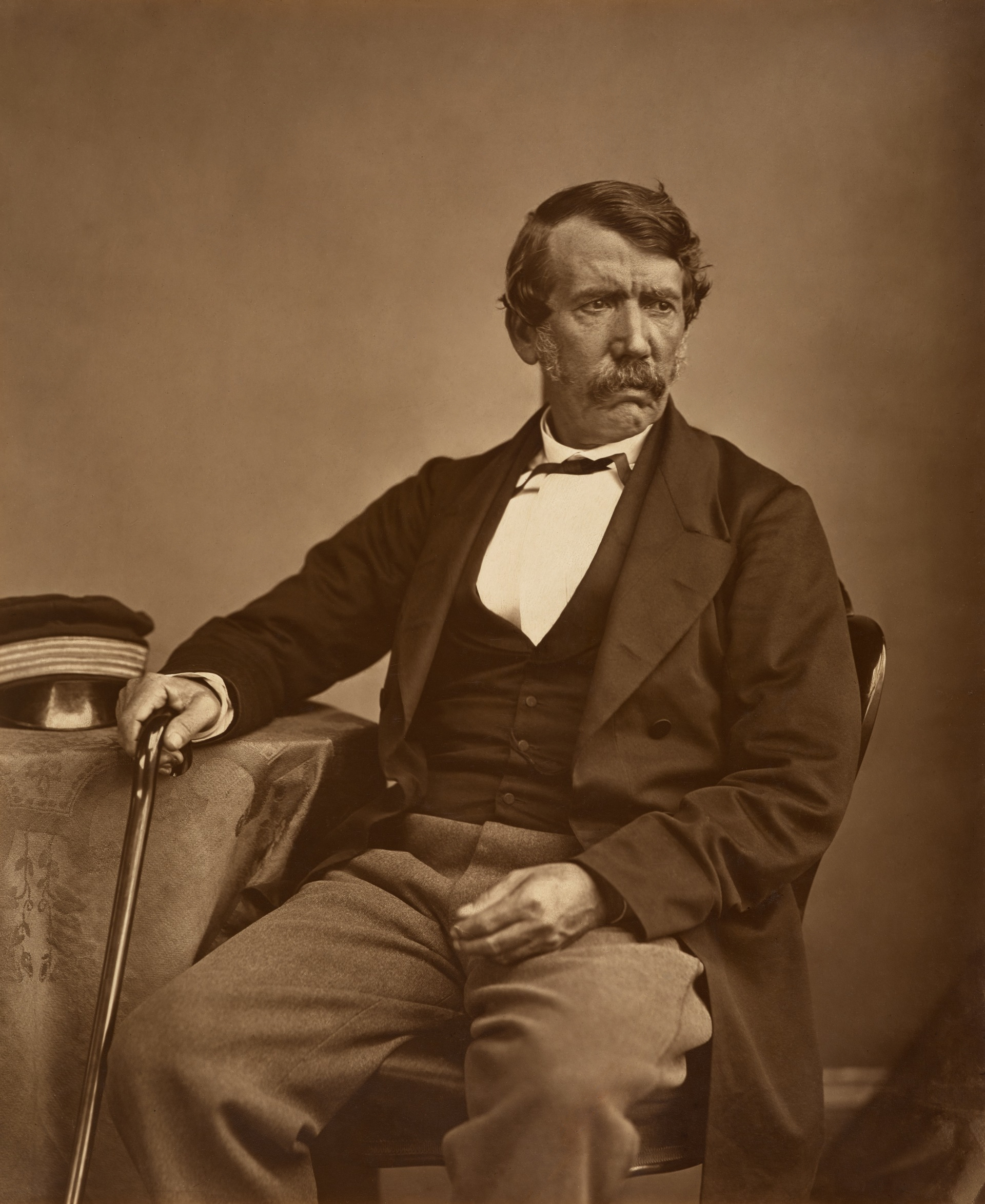
David Livingstone

- Dame Sally Davis (Chief Medical Officer)
- Sir Harold Ellis (surgeon)
- Sir Joseph Fayrer (physician noted for his writings on medicine in India)
- Marc Feldmann (expert on rheumatology)
- Sir Alexander Fleming (Nobel Laureate, Physiology and Medicine)
- Dorian Haskard (rheumatologist)
- Sneh Bhargav ( former director and Professor Emeritus of the All India Institute of Medical Sciences, New Delhi and former vice president and an elected Fellow of the National Academy of Sciences, India)
- Derek L. G. Hill, medical researcher, academic and expert on medical imaging
- Sir Frederick Hopkins (Nobel Laureate, Physiology and Medicine)
- Dame Rosalind Hurley (medical microbiologist, researcher, and ethicist)
- Sir Andrew Huxley (Nobel Laureate, Physiology and Medicine)
- Barry Kay (immunologist)
- Sir Bruce Keogh (medical director of the National Health Service)
- David Livingstone (congregationalist pioneer medical missionary in South Africa–Charing Cross Hospital)
- Azeem Majeed (Professor of Primary Care and Public Health)
- Norman Morris (obstetrician and healthcare reformer)
- Albert Neuberger (chemical pathologist)
- Tim Orchard (gastroenterologist)
- William Kitchen Parker (physician and zoologist)
- Sir Andrew Pollard (Chief Investigator on the Oxford–AstraZeneca COVID-19 vaccine)
- Sir Rodney Robert Porter (Nobel Laureate, Physiology and Medicine)
- Ann Redgrave (orthopaedic surgery)
- Sonia Saxena (physician at the School of Public Health)
- Bernard Spilsbury (pathologist and one of the pioneers of modern forensic medicine)
- Justin Stebbing (oncologist)
- Joseph Toynbee (otologist)
- Andrew Wakefield (discredited anti-vaccine doctor/activist)
- Augustus Desiré Waller (the invention of the electrocardiogram (ECG))
- Almroth Wright (advanced vaccination through the use of autogenous vaccines)
- Sir Magdi Yacoub (expert on live lobe lung transplant)
- Toshifumi Yokota (medical geneticist)

=== Physicists ===
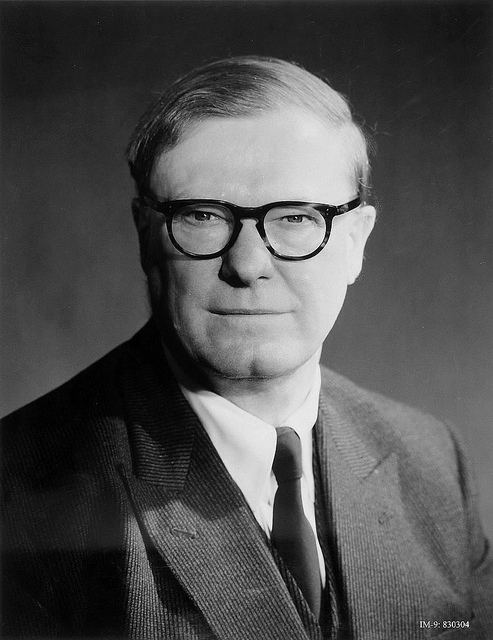
Lord Penney

- Anthony R. Barringer (geophysicist and inventor)
- Luís M. A. Bettencourt (physicist)
- Fernando Brandao (physicist)
- Lesley Cohen (physicist)
- Andrew Crumey (physicist)
- Michael Duff (string theorist)
- Sir John Ambrose Fleming (physicist)
- Piers Forster (climatologist)
- James R. Graham (astrophysicist)
- Joanna Haigh, professor of atmospheric physics
- Ann Heinson (high-energy particle physicist)
- Suzanne Imber (astrophysicist)
- Christopher Isham (physicist)
- Narinder Singh Kapany (physicist – optical fibres)
- Nicholas Kemmer (physicist)
- K. Kunaratnam (physicist)
- Norman Lockyer (discoverer of helium and founder of Nature)
- Yuval Ne'eman (1925–2006) (Israeli physicist, politician, and President of Tel Aviv University)
- T. E. Nevin, Irish physicist
- William George Penney (physicist who worked on the Manhattan Project)
- Nicholas J. Phillips (physicist)
- Martin Bodo Plenio (physicist)
- Patricia Rankin (physicist and Chair of the Department of Physics at Arizona State University
- Wolfgang Rindler (physicist and textbook author who introduced term 'Event Horizon')
- Christopher Sachrajda (physicist, professor at the University of Southampton)
- Roy Sambles (President of the Institute of Physics)
- Le Jeu Sham (physicist)
- John Sheffield (physicist)
- David Southwood (former President of the Royal Astronomical Society)
- Ray Streater (physicist)
- Neil Turok (Higgs Chair of Theoretical Physics at the University of Edinburgh)
- Vlatko Vedral (physicist)
- Sir Tejinder Virdee, experimental particle physicist;
- Sir Gilbert Walker (physicist)
- Louise Willingale (physicist)

== Law and politics ==
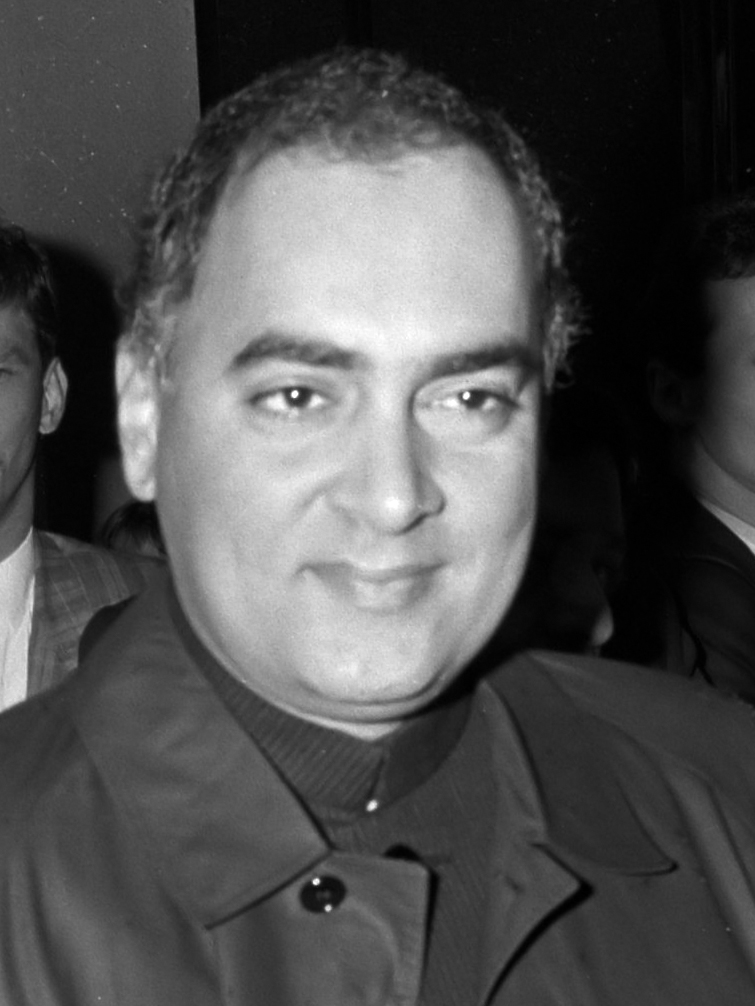
Rajiv Gandhi, Former Prime Minister of India

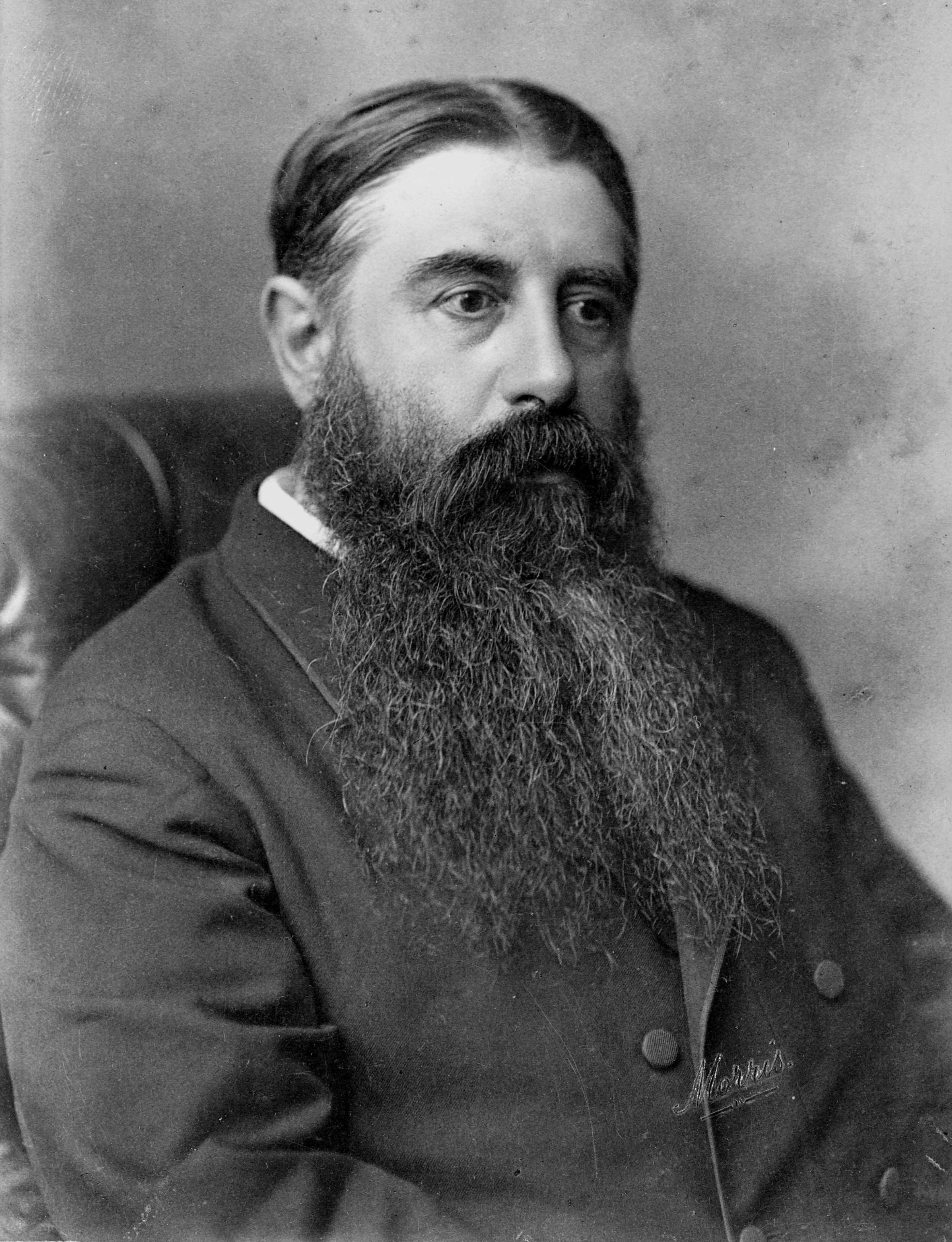
Julius Vogel, Former Prime Minister of New Zealand

- Adam Afriyie (MP for Windsor)
- Sir James Allen (Minister of Foreign Affairs, New Zealand)
- Hussain al-Shahristani (Iraq's Minister for Higher Education)
- Thomas Anthony Brake (British Liberal Democrat Member of Parliament (MP) for Carshalton and Wallington)
- Matthew Carrington (former Conservative Member of Parliament for Fulham, 1987–1997)
- Maria da Graça Carvalho (Minister of Energy, Portugal)
- Chen Jining (member of the Politburo of the Chinese Communist Party, Communist Party secretary of Shanghai)
- António Costa Silva (former Minister of Economy, Portugal)
- Frederic Creswell (mining engineer and Minister of Defense in South Africa)
- Harriet Cross (MP For Gordon and Buchan)
- Edmund Daukoru (Minister of Energy for Nigeria and former OPEC President (2006))
- Les Ebdon, Director of Fair Access to Higher Education
- Rajiv Gandhi (former Prime Minister of India)
- Manuel Heitor (former Minister of Science, Technology and Higher Education, Portugal)
- Adam Holloway (journalist and former Conservative Member of Parliament for Gravesham)
- Branislav Ivković (Serbian politician)
- Abubakarr Jalloh (Minister for Natural Resources, Sierra Leone)
- Sir Adrian Johns (former Governor of Gibraltar and former Second Sea Lord)
- Chris Kelly (former MP for Dudley South)
- Phillip Lee (MP For Bracknell)
- Amin Liew Abdullah (Bruneian Cabinet Minister and businessman)
- Rilwan Lukman (Petroleum Resources Minister of Nigeria and former Secretary General OPEC)
- Kaveh Madani (Vice President of the United Nations Environmental Assembly Bureau and Deputy Vice President of Iran)
- Ken Michael (Governor of Western Australia)
- Layla Moran (MP for Oxford West and Abingdon)
- Chi Onwurah (MP for Newcastle upon Tyne Central)
- Sir Trevor Phillips (journalist and former Chair of the London Assembly)
- J. Y. Pillay (Singaporean civil servant)
- Dame Joan Ruddock (former MP for Lewisham Deptford)
- Sydney Russell-Wells (former MP for London University)
- Guy Saint-Pierre (Canadian politician and entrepreneur)
- Christos Staikouras (Greek politician and economist)
- Richard Thomas Taylor (Independent Member of Parliament for Wyre Forest)
- Nina Temple (Final Secretary of the Communist Party of Great Britain)
- Teo Chee Hean (Former Deputy Prime Minister of Singapore)
- Des Turner (former British Labour MP for Brighton Kemptown)
- Dyah Roro Esti Widya Putri (Member of Parliament, Indonesia)
- Sir Julius Vogel (former Prime Minister of New Zealand)

== Business ==
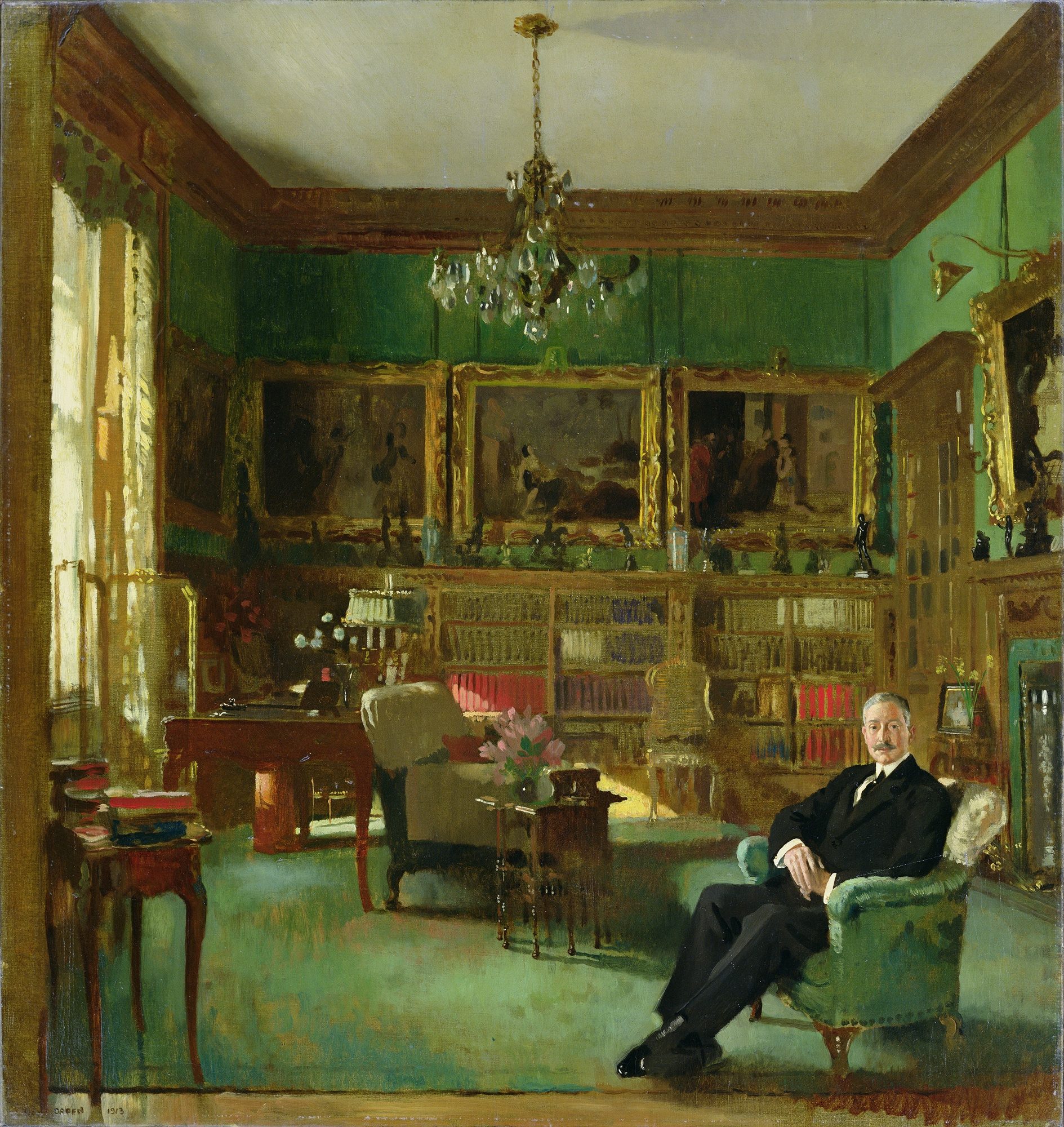
Otto Beit

- Kaveh Alamouti (investment banker)
- Alfred Beit (gold and diamond magnate)
- Otto Beit (financier)
- Stan Bharti (founder of Forbes & Manhattan)
- Michael Birch (Founder of Bebo)
- Chew Choon Seng (CEO of Singapore Airlines)
- Hamdan Mohamad (Malaysia's water baron, CEO & President of Ranhill Berhad)
- Iain Conn (Group Managing Director of BP)
- Michael Cowpland (founder of Corel)
- Keith Duckworth (Founder of Cosworth Engineering)
- Colin Dyer (CEO of Jones Lang LaSalle)
- Bülent Eczacıbaşı (Chairman of Eczacıbaşı Holding)
- Alan Howard (co-founder of Brevan Howard)
- Koh Boon Hwee (Chairman of DBS Bank, Singapore)
- Anil Kumar (born 1958), management consultant who pled guilty to insider trading
- Thomas Kwok Ping-kwong (Billionaire, former joint chairman and managing director of Sun Hung Kai Properties)
- Walter Kwok (real estate developer)
- Martin Lamb, (Chief Executive of IMI plc)
- Sir David Li (Executive Chairman of the Bank of East Asia)
- Danny Lui (founder of Lenovo)
- Mehraj Mattoo (Global Head, COMAS, Commerzbank)
- Cyrus Pallonji Mistry (Chairman of Tata Group)
- Charlie Muirhead (Entrepreneur, founder of Rightster)
- Ronald Oxburgh (non-executive chairman of Royal Dutch Shell PLC)
- Leo Quinn (group chief executive of Balfour Beatty plc)
- Ian Read (CEO of Pfizer)
- Andrew Rickman OBE (technology billionaire)
- Sir Ralph Robins (Former CEO of Rolls-Royce)
- Harold Roxbee Cox (aircraft engineer)
- Gary Tanaka (founder of Amerindo Investment Advisors)
- Winston Wong (businessman)
- Juwon Lawal, founder of Crestal Group

== Literature ==
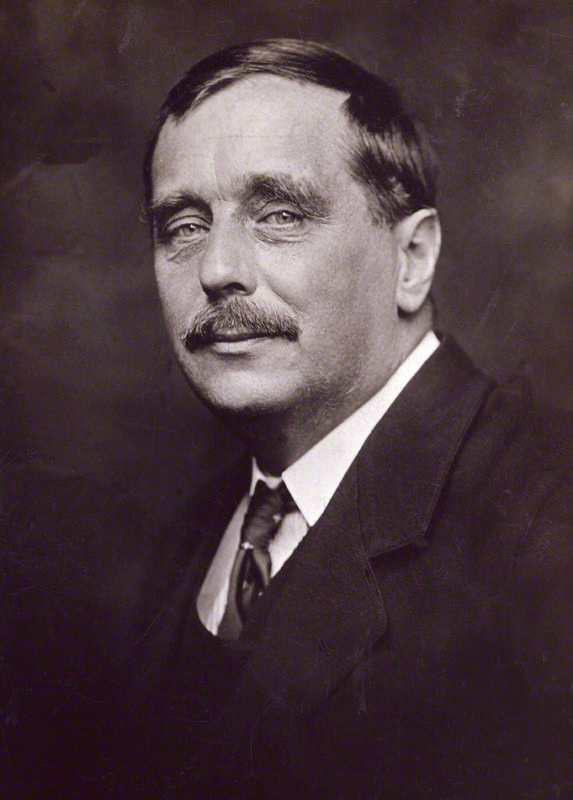
H. G. Wells

- Andrew Crumey (novelist)
- David Irving (author)
- Simon Singh (popular science author)
- H. G. Wells (science fiction author)

== Others ==
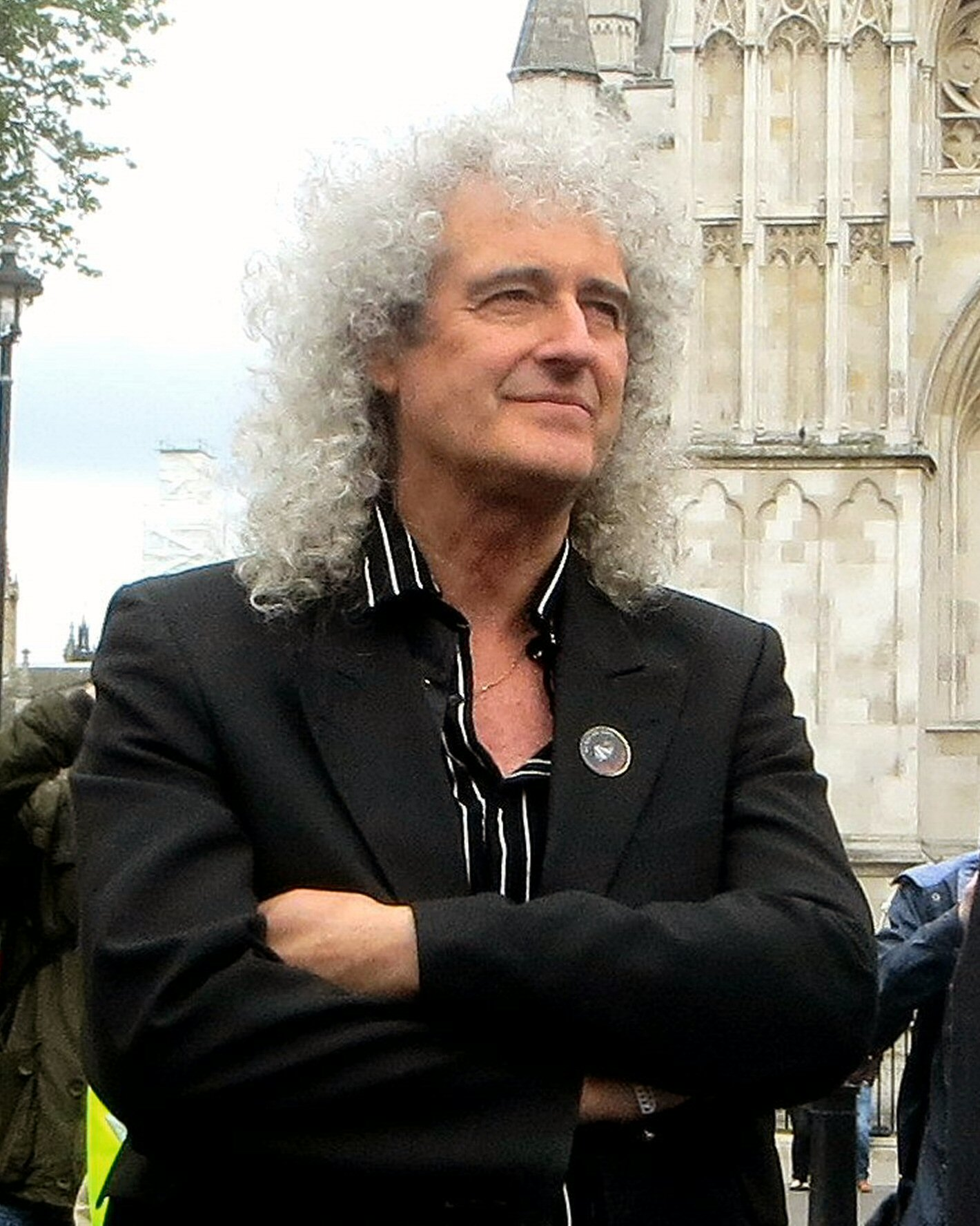
Brian May

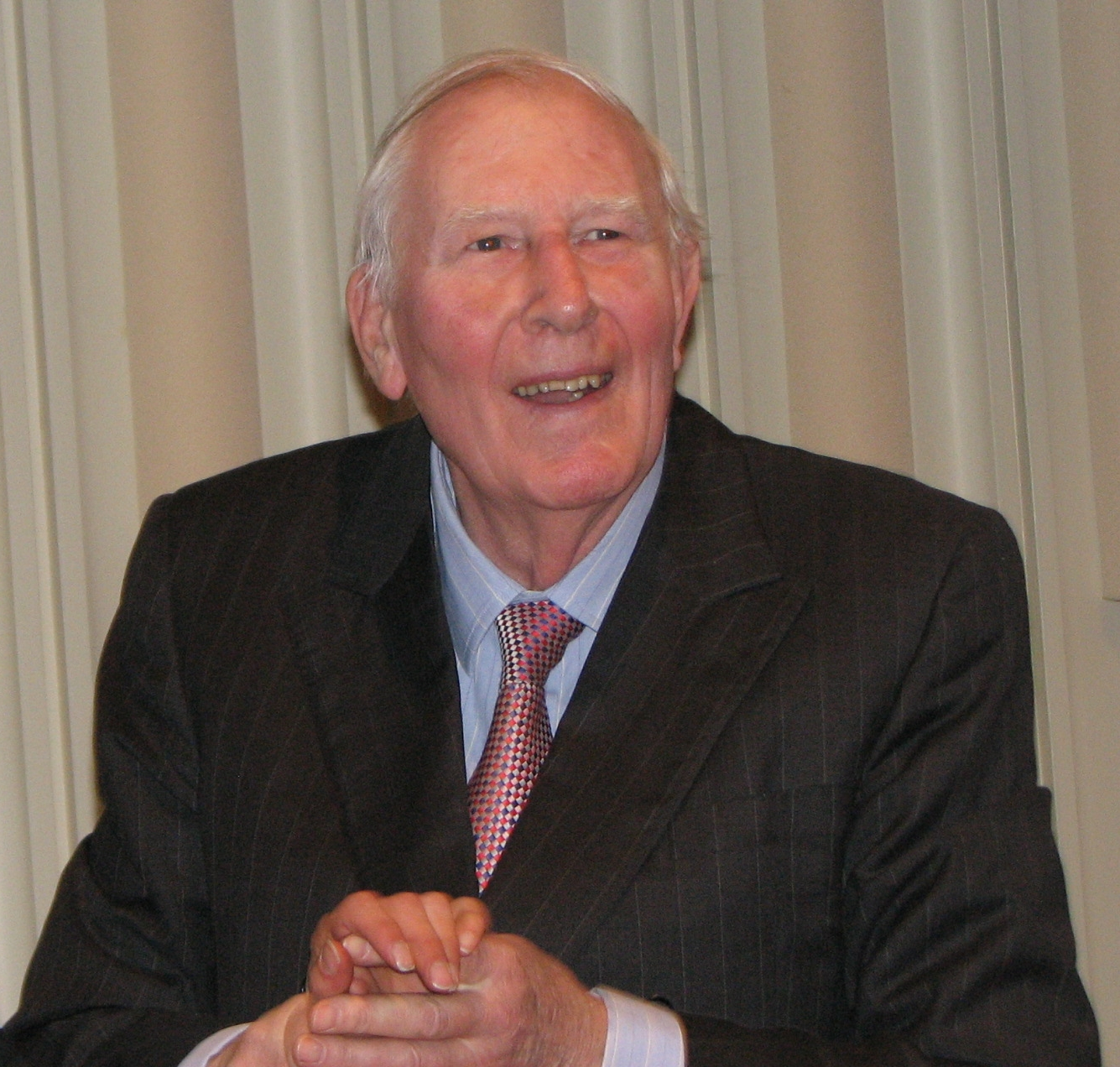
Roger Bannister

- Anjana Ahuja (journalist)
- Kit Armstrong (pianist and composer)
- Louis Attrill (Sydney Olympics gold medallist, rowing)
- Sir Roger Bannister (athlete)
- Laurent Bonomo (visiting student)
- Will Burrard-Lucas (photographer)
- David Cain (composer)
- I. C. Chacko (writer)
- Henry Cole (civil servant)
- Declan Curry (presenter on BBC News 24)
- Simon Dennis (Sydney Olympics gold medallist, rowing)
- Bill Durodie (academic, risk analyst)
- Andy Fanshawe (mountaineer)
- Gabriel Ferez (visiting student)
- Pallab Ghosh (BBC Science Correspondent)
- Adrian Greenwood (historian and art dealer)
- Jessica Hsuan (Chinese actress)
- David Irving (author)
- Adam Kay (of the comedy duo Amateur Transplants)
- Nalin Kulatilaka (economist)
- Aarif Lee (Chinese actor and singer)
- Tan Yock Lin (professor of law and author)
- Stephen McGann (actor and science communicator)
- Sir Brian May (astrophysicist, more commonly known as a member of the rock band Queen)
- Anthony R. Michaelis (science journalist and publisher)
- Andreas Mogensen (First Danish astronaut)
- Murad Osmann (photographer)
- Niharica Raizada (actress)
- Paul Rogers (Professor of Peace)
- Ted Simon (journalist)
- Sir Trevor Phillips (British writer, broadcaster and former politician)
- Simon Singh (popular science author)
- Daniel V. Snaith (IDM artist, records under the name Caribou)
- Richard Southwood (Vice-Chancellor, University of Oxford)
- George Reginald Starr (Special Operations Executive officer)
- Emma Townshend (Academic, musician and columnist)
- Kevin Walton (military, awarded the George Cross in 1946)
- Lancelot Ware (biochemist, barrister and co-founder of Mensa International)
- Jane Yardley (author)
- Raymond Yiu (composer)
- Yeoh Li Tian (Malaysian first chess grandmaster)

== Faculty and staff ==
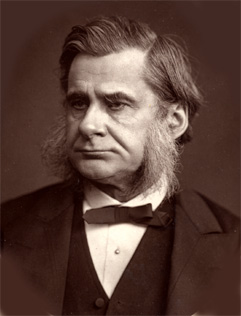
Thomas Henry Huxley

- Samson Abramsky, computer scientist
- John Stuart Archer, Vice-chancelulor and principal of Heriot-Watt University
- Wendy Barclay, virologist
- John Beddington, population biologist
- Derek Bell, physician
- Sir Leszek Borysiewicz, immunologist and former Vice-Chancellor of the University of Cambridge
- Stephen D. M. Brown, geneticist
- William Brown, mycologist and plant pathologist
- Keith Browning (atmospheric scientist)
- Martin Buck, microbiologist
- Sir Ernst Boris Chain (Nobel Laureate, Physiology and Medicine)
- Colin Cherry (cognitive scientist – expert in cocktail party problem)
- Keith Clark (computer scientist)
- Ara Darzi, Baron Darzi of Denham (Parliamentary Under-Secretary, Leading Surgeon)
- Abbas Edalat (computer scientist)
- Peter Ellaway (Professor of neurosciences and mental health)
- Erol Gelenbe (computer scientist – G-networks and the random neural network)
- Nicholas Harrison (Professor of Computational Materials Science)
- Michael Hassell (population ecology)
- John Henry (toxicologist) (clinical toxicologist who did crucial work on poisoning and drug overdose)
- Anita Holdcroft (anaesthetist, expert on acute pain in women)
- Sir Brian Hoskins (dynamical meteorologist)
- T. H. Huxley (biologist and author)
- Nick Jennings (computer scientist)
- Charles Kennedy (economist)
- Alexander King, scientist and policy adviser
- Armand Marie Leroi (biologist)
- Sir Basil John Mason (meteorologist)
- David Miles (economist)
- Christine Moffatt (nurse in leg ulcer care)
- Mirabelle Muûls (economist)
- Stephen Ramsey (scientific glassblower)
- Michael Stumpf (systems biologist)
- Robert Winston (fertility expert, politician, scientist and television presenter)
- Toshifumi Yokota (geneticist)

=== Chemists ===
- John Albery, chemist
- James Barber, biochemist
- Michael Bearpark, chemist and musician
- Anne Beloff-Chain (professor of biochemistry)
- Sir Alan Fersht, chemist
- Sir Edward Frankland (chemist)
- William Fyfe (geochemist)
- Alain Gringarten (director of the Center for Petroleum Studies)
- Sir Walter Haworth (Nobel laureate, chemistry)
- Sir Cyril Hinshelwood (Nobel laureate, chemistry)
- August Wilhelm von Hofmann (chemist)
- Jack Lewis, Baron Lewis of Newnham, inorganic chemist
- Michael Mingos (inorganic chemist)
- David Phillips, chemist
- George Porter (Nobel laureate, chemistry)
- Rodney Robert Porter (biochemist, Nobel Prize in Physiology or Medicine)

=== Engineers ===
- Igor Aleksander, electronic engineer
- John Argyris (civil and aeronautical engineer, one of the founders of the Finite Element Method)
- Peter Bradshaw, aeronautical engineer
- John Burland (civil engineer) – the person who stabilised the Leaning Tower of Pisa
- Clementine Chambon (chemical engineer)
- Stephen Glaister (civil engineering)
- Larry L. Hench, chair of the Ceramics Materials Department
- Dame Julia Higgins (chemical engineer)
- Frank Irving (aeronautical engineer)
- Eric Laithwaite (engineer)
- Dame Julia Polak (tissue engineer)
- Max Reis (chemical engineer and President of the Technion – Israel Institute of Technology)
- Brian Spalding (computational fluid dynamics)
- Molly Stevens, biomedical engineer

=== Mathematicians and statisticians ===
- Deborah Ashby, medical statistician
- Kevin Buzzard (mathematician, number theory)
- Sydney Chapman (mathematician)
- Alessio Corti (mathematician)
- Simon Donaldson (mathematician, Fields Medallist)
- Yael Naim Dowker (mathematician)
- David Hand, statistician
- Martin Hairer (mathematician, Fields medallist)
- Walter Hayman (mathematician)
- Sir James Lighthill (mathematician)
- Emma McCoy (mathematician and statistician)
- John Nelder (statistician)
- Andre Neves (mathematician)
- Sylvia Richardson (statistician)
- Klaus Roth (mathematician, Fields medallist)
- Sir Adrian Smith (mathematician)
- Richard Thomas (mathematician, FRS)
- Alfred North Whitehead (mathematician)
- Frank Yates (statistician, Guy Medallist)

=== Physicists ===
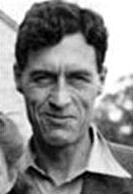
Patrick Blackett, Nobel laureate in physics

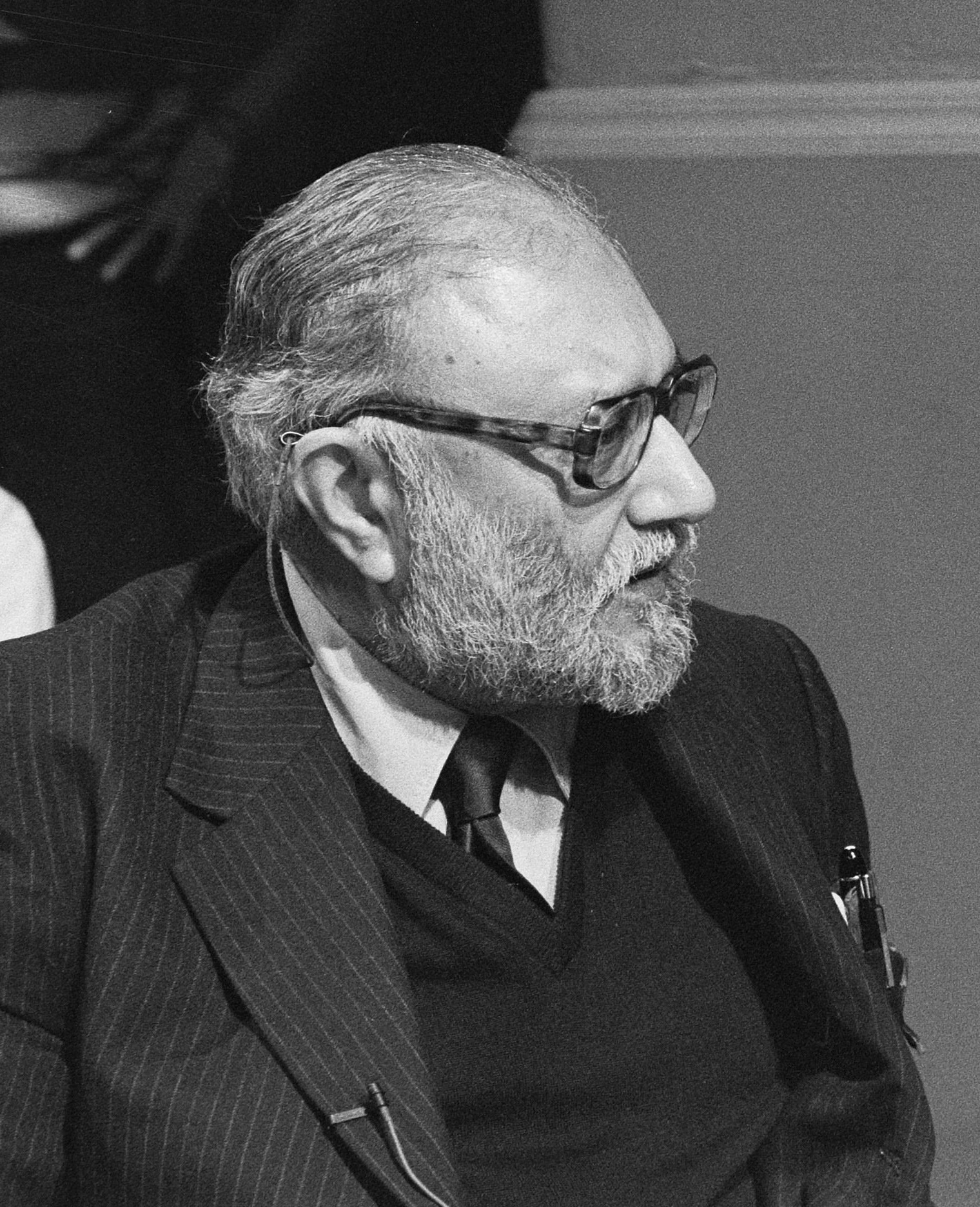
Abdus Salam, Nobel laureate in physics

- Per Bak (theoretical physicist, self-organized criticality)
- Patrick Blackett, Baron Blackett (Nobel laureate, physics)
- David Blow (biophysicist)
- Sir Steven Cowley, physicist and president of Corpus Christi College, Oxford;
- Fay Dowker (physicist)
- Dennis Gabor (Nobel laureate, physics)
- Betty Johnson (American theoretical physicist)
- Gerald Guralnik (American theoretical physicist)
- Carl Hagen (American particle physicist)
- Sir Tom Kibble (physicist)
- Julia King (Chief Executive of the Institute of Physics)
- Sir Peter Knight (physicist, quantum optics)
- Peter Higgs (British theoretical physicist)
- Leonard Mandel (physicist, founder of quantum optics)
- Robert May, Baron May of Oxford (physicist, member of the House of Lords)
- Kirpal Nandra (astrophysicist)
- Jenny Nelson (Professor of Physics)
- Sir John Pendry (physicist)
- Michael Rowan-Robinson (astronomer)
- Abdus Salam (Nobel laureate, physics)
- John M Squire, biophysicist
- R. A. Stradling (physicist)
- Ray Streater, physicist
- Sir George Paget Thomson (Nobel laureate, physics)
- Vlatko Vedral (physicist)

== See also ==
- President and Rector of Imperial College London
- List of Nobel laureates affiliated with Imperial College London
- List of Fellows of Imperial College London
