= Derek Hill =

Derek Hill may refer to:

- Derek Ingram Hill (1912–2003), English Anglican priest
- Derek Hill (painter) (1916–2000), English portrait and landscape painter
- Derek Hill (racing driver) (born 1975), American racing driver
- Derek R. Hill (active 1993 and after), American production designer
- Derek Hill (gridiron football) (1967–2012), American football player
- Derek Hill (baseball) (born 1995), American baseball player
- Derek L. G. Hill, professor of medical imaging

== See also ==
- Hill (surname)
