= Adinath Lahiri =

Indian geochemist (1916–1975)

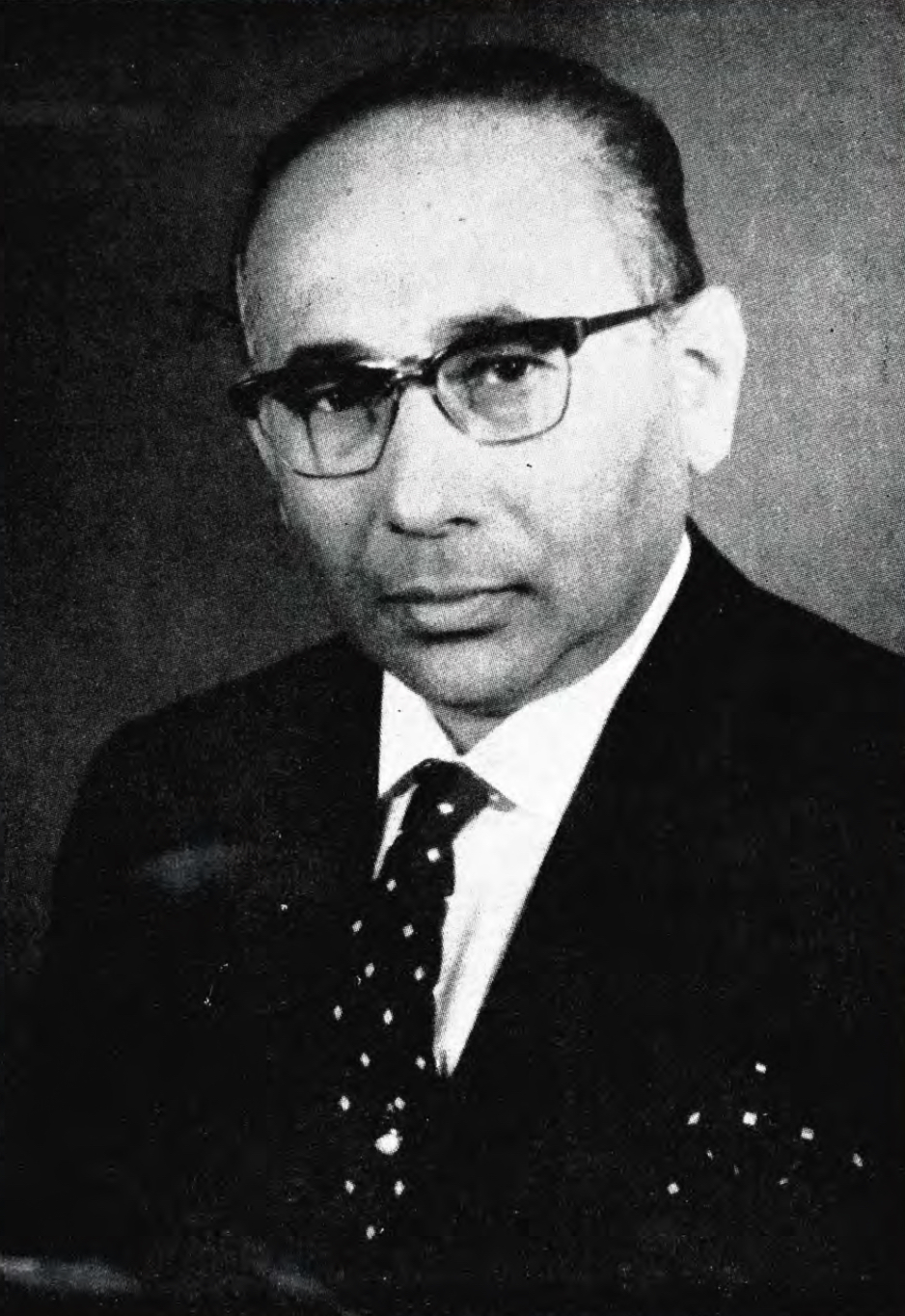
- Born: 24 August 1916; Pabna, British India
- Died: 26 August 1975 (aged 59)
- Occupations: Geochemist; Fuel technologist
- Years active: 1942–1975
- Known for: Institution builder Researches on Coal
- Awards: Padma Bhushan; Padma Shri; Imperial College Judd Memorial Prize

Signature
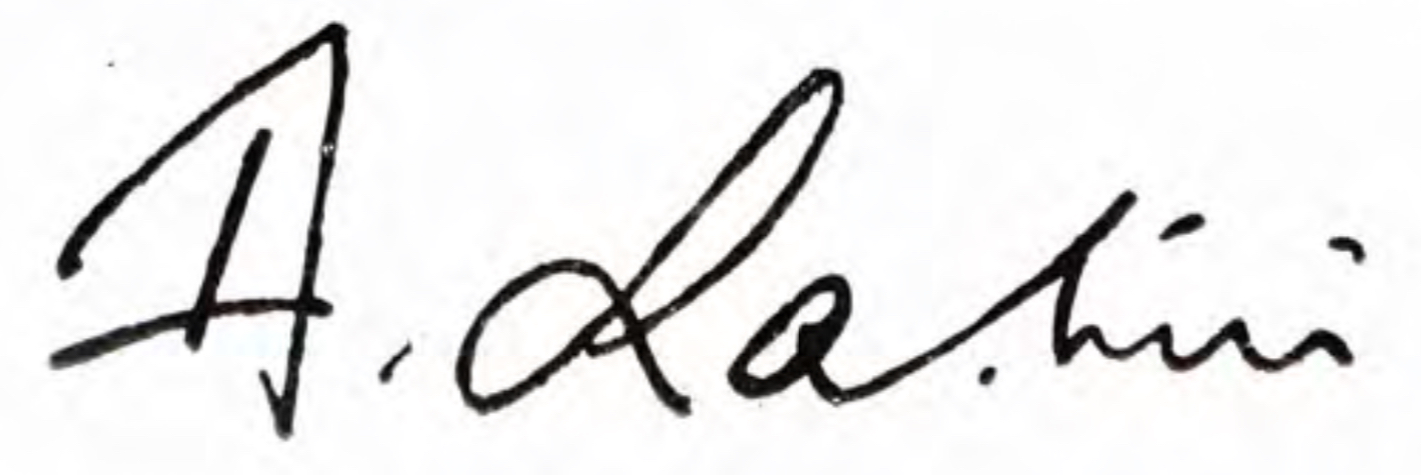

Adinath Lahiri (1916–1975) was an Indian geochemist and fuel technologist, known for his efforts in developing the Central Fuel Research Institute, Dhanbad (CFRI) into one of the premier research institutions in India. He was the director of the National Coal Development Corporation (NCDC) and contributed towards the establishment of the Central Mining Research Station, which was later merged with CFRI to form the present day Central Institute of Mining and Fuel Research). The Government of India awarded him the fourth highest civilian honour, the Padma Shri, in 1960, and followed it up with the third highest civilian honour, the Padma Bhushan, in 1969, for his contributions to science and technology.

== Biography ==
Adinath Lahiri was born on 24 August 1916. After completing his master's degree in geology and geochemistry from the University of Calcutta, he obtained Sir Palit Foreign Fellowship of the university and did his doctoral studies at the Imperial College of the University of London to secure a PhD, winning the Judd Memorial Prize for the best thesis in geochemistry. He started his career as a research associate at the Department of Chemical Technology at Imperial College in 1942, but joined the Royal Air Force during World War II to serve as a Scientific Officer and, later, as the Head of the Fuel and Oil Research Section at the Royal Aircraft Establishment, Farnborough airfield. After the war was over, he returned to India, in 1945, to take up the position as the Assistant Director (Planning) at the Council of Scientific and Industrial Research (CSIR) when he contributed to the planning and establishment of the Central Fuel Research Institute (CFRI), Dhanbad. He joined the institute after its inception as the Deputy Director and when the founder director, J. W. Whitteker left, he took over as the director in 1953 to stay with the institute till his superannuation in 1974. In between, he also underwent training under a Summer Fellowship at the Massachusetts Institute of Technology School of Science in 1950. After his retirement from CFRI, he joined the United Nations as an advisor and served in Chile when he died on 26 August 1975, two days after his 60th birthday, succumbing to a cardiac arrest.

Lahiri's research interests covered the fields of petrography, oxidation mechanisms, solvent extraction, surface chemistry of coal, catalysts and adsorbents and he was credited with several innovations in fuel technology, which earned him over 90 patents. His contributions have been reported in the development of beehive coke oven, process technologies for the isolation and recovery of useful chemicals from the byproducts of coal, process technologies for the production of resins and other compounds, and active carbon and ion exchangers for determination of water-based coal. He published his research and professional experiences by way of over 500 articles, Reaction of coals under plasma conditions: direct production of acetylene from coal, National Coal Development Corporation A New Approach, and Trekking on the Southern Bhutan Frontier counting among them. During his tenure with CFRI, he proposed the setting up of Central Mining Research Station for overcoming the coal mining issues faced in India and served as the director of the National Coal Development Corporation. In 1954, he proposed energy studies, a pioneering effort in India, and served the Indian Energy Survey Committee of 1965 and the National Fuel Policy Committee of 1974, as a member.

Lahiri was an elected Fellow of the Institution of Engineers, Institute of Fuels (London) and the Indian National Science Academy (INSA), and served as a member of the INSA council from 1968 to 1970. In 1960, the Government of India awarded him the Padma Shri, the country's fourth-highest civilian honour. Nine years later, in 1969, he was included in the Republic Day Honours list again, this time for India's third-highest civilian honour, the Padma Bhushan. Central Fuel Research Institute, the institute he helped found, have since renamed their conferencing facility as Adinath Lahiri Hall, in his honour.

== See also ==
- De Nobili School, FRI
- Imperial College London
- List of Imperial College London people
