= Nicholas Harrison =

Nicholas or Nick Harrison may refer to:

- Nicholas Harrison (physicist) (born 1964), English theoretical physicist
- Nicholas Harrison (athlete) (born 1970), Australian long-distance runner
- Nick Harrison (cricketer) (born 1992), English cricketer
- Nick Harrison (racing) (1982–2019), American stock car racing crew chief
- Nick Harrison (Shortland Street), a character on Shortland Street
- Nicky Harrison, strings arranger for The Rolling Stones' album Goats Head Soup
