= Holdcroft =

Holdcroft is a surname. Notable people with the surname include:

- Anita Holdcroft, British emeritus professor of Anaesthetics
- George Holdcroft (1909–1983), British footballer
- James Holdcroft (1874–1926), British footballer
- Ted Holdcroft (c. 1882–1952), British footballer
