= John G. Taylor =

British physicist and author (1931–2012)

John Gerald Taylor
- Born: 18 August 1931
- Died: 10 March 2012 (aged 80)

Academic background
- Education: Christ's College, Cambridge

Academic work
- Discipline: Physics
- Institutions: King's College London
- Notable works: Science and the Supernatural

John Gerald Taylor (18 August 1931 – 10 March 2012) was a British physicist and author. He is notable for writing a book critical of paranormal phenomena.

== Biography ==
Taylor attended King Edward VI Grammar School, Chelmsford, and Mid-Essex Polytechnic, before gaining MA (Cantab) and PhD degrees from Christ's College, Cambridge (1950–1956). He had a wide-ranging academic career in mathematical physics and artificial intelligence. He was an emeritus professor and director of the centre for Neural Networks at King's College London and guest scientist of the Research Centre at the Institute of Medicine in Jülich, Germany.

Prof. Taylor published over 500 scientific papers in theoretical physics, particle physics, astronomy, pure mathematics and neural networks. He also published 12 books and edited 13 others. He was one of the early pioneers in artificial intelligence and served as European Editor-in-Chief of the journal Neural Networks. He also served as President of the International Neural Network Society (1995) as well as President of the European Neural Network Society (1993–94).

From 2007 to 2012, Taylor led a unique research program at Commerzbank's Alternative Investment Strategies (COMAS) Group. The program used artificial intelligence techniques to create portfolios of hedge funds. This is the first program of its kind in the fund of hedge funds industry.

In 2011, Taylor co-founded Commonwealth Capital Management LLP together with Nathaniel Rothschild and Mehraj Mattoo. The company launched its first systematic fund of CTAs on Deutsche Bank's dbSelect platform based on Taylor's artificial intelligence models developed while he worked at COMAS.

His previous positions and interests, while still at King's College, were in mathematics and physics. He was the author of many popular books.

Taylor also trained as an actor and performed in plays and films, wrote several science fiction plays and directed stage productions in Oxford and Cambridge.

== Parapsychology ==
Taylor, after witnessing spoon bending by Uri Geller, became interested in parapsychology. At first he believed that Geller's feats as well as other alleged paranormal phenomena were genuine. He wrote a book titled Superminds (1975) in which he argued for a physical explanation for the paranormal. He believed the explanation for extrasensory perception, psychokinesis, spoon bending and other paranormal phenomena may be found in electromagnetism. However, experiments that he conducted under laboratory conditions were negative which left him sceptical regarding the validity of paranormal phenomena.

Taylor had tested children in metal bending. According to Martin Gardner the controls were inadequate as the children would put paper clips in their pockets and later take one out twisted or be left with metal rods unobserved. James Randi managed to bend an aluminium bar when Taylor was not looking and scratch on it "Bent by Randi". In other experiments two scientists from Bath University examined metal bending with children in a room which was secretly being videotaped through a one-way mirror. The film revealed that the children bent the objects with their hands and feet. Due to the evidence of trickery, Taylor concluded metal bending had no paranormal basis.

Taylor wrote that the physicalist explanation in which properties of objects have been explained in terms of their constituents has been most successful in science. The forces holding them together are gravity, radioactivity, electromagnetism and the nuclear force. Taylor wrote that only one force could possibly explain alleged paranormal phenomena: electromagnetic forces acting on the normal constituents of bodies. Taylor wrote that when science faces up to the supernatural it is a case of "electromagnetism or bust". In a four-year investigation into the paranormal, Taylor and his colleague Eduardo Balanovski searched for abnormal electromagnetic signals in parapsychological experiments. Electromagnetic and radio-wave detectors were used but no abnormal electromagnetic signals or paranormal effects were observed.

Taylor wrote that an unknown fifth force causing psychokinesis would have to transmit a great deal of energy. The energy would have to overcome the electromagnetic forces binding the atoms together. The atoms would need to respond more strongly to the fifth force while it is operative than to electric forces. Such an additional force between atoms should therefore exist all the time and not during only alleged paranormal occurrences. Taylor wrote there is no scientific trace of such a force in physics, down to many orders of magnitude; thus if a scientific viewpoint is to be preserved the idea of any fifth force must be discarded. Taylor concluded there is no possible physical mechanism for psychokinesis and it is in complete contradiction to established science.

In his book Science and the Supernatural (1980), Taylor concluded that all the paranormal phenomena he investigated turned out to have a naturalistic scientific explanation or did not occur under careful controlled conditions. He wrote that many of the results could be explained by fraud, credulity, fantasy and sensory cues. The book received a positive review in the New Scientist, which concluded "he will not make any converts among believers in the paranormal, but at the same time, he probably will not alienate many of them either".

== Quotes ==
We have searched for the supernatural and not found it. In the main, only poor experimentation, shoddy theory and human gullibility have been encountered. There is also the realization that nearly all of the claimed paranormal phenomena are in complete contradiction to established science. John Taylor (1980) Science and the Supernatural

== Published books ==
He is author of the following books:

- The Mind: A User's Manual, (2006), ISBN 0-470-02222-1.
- Neural Networks and the Financial Markets Predicting, Combining, and Portfolio Optimisation (2002), ISBN 1-85233-531-9
- The Race for Consciousness (1999), ISBN 0-262-20115-1.
- The Promise of Neural Networks (Perspectives in Neural Computing), (1993), ISBN 3-540-19773-7.
- Science and the Supernatural: An Investigation of Paranormal Phenomena Including Psychic Healing, Clairvoyance, Telepathy, and Precognition by a Distinguished Physicist and Mathematician (1980), ISBN 0-85117-191-5
- Superminds: An Enquiry into the Paranormal (1975), ISBN 0-333-17701-0
- New Worlds in Physics (1974), ISBN 0-571-10258-1
- Black Holes: The End of the Universe? (1973), ISBN 0-380-00327-9
- The New Physics (1972), ISBN 0-465-05066-2
- The Shape of Minds to Come (1971), ISBN 0-7181-0788-8
- When the Clock Struck Zero (1993) ISBN 978-0-312-11096-3
