= Mehraj Mattoo =

Indian-born British banker

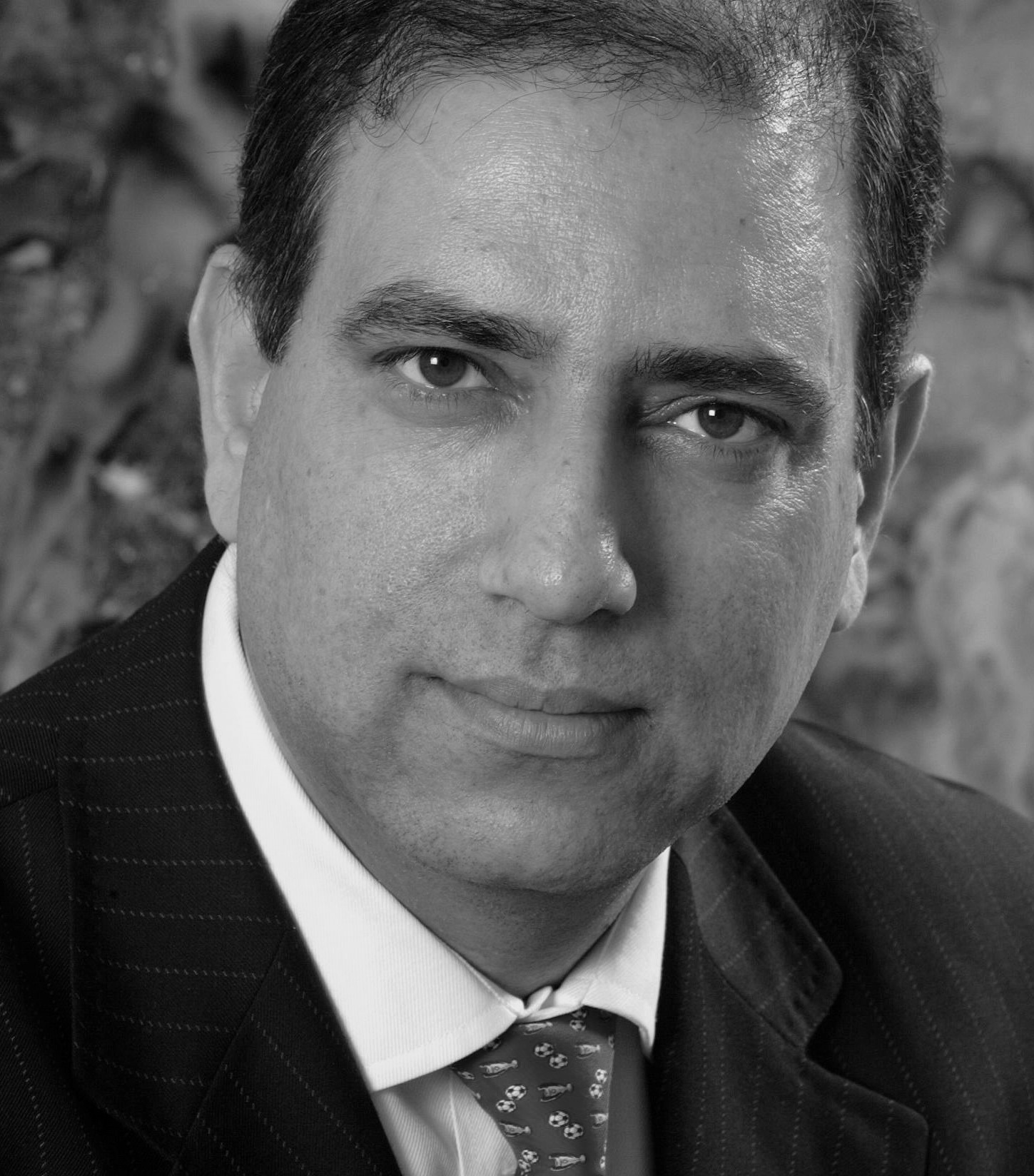
- Mattoo in 2003
- Education: Imperial College London / Harvard University / MIT
- Occupation: Investment Banker / Financier / Economist / Author

Mehraj Mattoo is a British investment banker, economist and author; and an ALI Fellow and senior fellow at Harvard University. He is the former global head of asset management at Commerzbank AG. Prior to Commerzbank, Mattoo was the managing director of Dresdner Kleinwort Wasserstein, the investment banking arm of Dresdner Bank AG, the second largest bank in Germany. In the mid-1990s, Mattoo was co-head of the fund derivatives group in the City at BNP Paribas. He has been credited for pioneering the use of structured products on alternative investments, especially hedge funds, that helped attract institutional assets to the hedge fund industry and contributed to its growth over the following decade. At Commerzbank he instituted a move toward neural network (machine learning) based asset allocation, launching the first Computational Intelligence group in the City under the leadership of late Prof. John G. Taylor.

Mattoo was born in India but was educated at Imperial College in London, where he was awarded an MSc and a PhD from the University of London. He was the inaugural NatWest Research Fellow at Imperial College (1986–1989) and a visiting research scholar at the MIT Sloan School of Management. Mattoo is a leading commentator on alternative investments and a known critic of the traditional asset management model. Dr. Mattoo is the author of Structured Derivatives published in 1997 by the Financial Times and a co-author of books on interest rate risk management and alternative investments.

In 2015, he was appointed advanced leadership fellow at Harvard University, and in 2016 he became a senior fellow.

== See also ==
- Derivative (finance)
- Structured products
- Hedge funds
- Prominent Alumni of Imperial College
- Prominent Alumni of Harvard University
