= Sarvantara Village =

Sarvantara is a small rural village located in the block of Nawabganj in the district of Bahraich of the state of Uttar Pradesh. It is a Dalit-dominated village which was in the dark even after 69 years of Independence. With no electricity network, the natives had to cover distances to nearby electrified villages. The villagers had to walk miles to charge their cell phones, what to speak of lighting and fans. They village was finally received light with Oorja, a London based social enterprise, launched its 8 kW solar mini grid.

== Electrification of Village ==
Due to the efforts of Clementine Chambon, who is a student from Imperial College, London, the United Kingdom. A final-year student of PhD has helped village with Oorja. Oorja promotes sustainable local economic development, and aims to give clean energy to almost 450 million people who have no access to reliable electricity in rural India. The mini solar grid provides energy-affordable lighting, charging phones and running fans in homes.

== Oorja ==
Clementine Chambon with her colleague, Indian social entrepreneur Amit Saraogi founded Oorja in the year 2015. The organization gives economical and reliable power to rural communities in India that are currently not connected to the country's national energy grid network. By doing this, it could provide a larger distribution of electricity to power small enterprises that includes water purification stations, sewing cooperatives, and grain mills in the village. The team at Oorja then also planned to increase more financial to enable them to roll out some more mini-grids to other villages in 2018.

== Demographic ==
The majority of the population in Sarvantara is farmers and relies on agriculture for their livelihoods. Due to Oorja, the farmers will get fuel for productivity. The renewable energy generated will also benefits power pumps to give irrigation services to farmers. This will also provide a significant cost savings compared to diesel-powered pumps.

== Geographic ==
The people of the village use Hindi, Urdu, and Awadhi for communication. The village falls under the division of Devipatan. Nanpara, Bahraich, Laharpur, Kheri are the nearby Cities to Sarvantara.
