= Peter Dornan =

British physicist

Peter John Dornan FRS (born 1939) is a British physicist, and professor at Imperial College London where he advised his PhD student Ann Heinson.

On 18 September 2009, a festschrift was held in his honor. Dornan was awarded the Rutherford Medal and Prize in 2002.
