= Luís M. A. Bettencourt =

Physicist

- Occupations: Physicist, urban and complex systems researcher, author and academic

Academic background
- Education: Licenciatura., Engineering Physics; PhD., Theoretical Physics
- Alma mater: Instituto Superior Técnico; Imperial College London

Academic work
- Institutions: University of Chicago; Santa Fe Institute
- Website: https://www.luisbettencourt.com/

Luís M. A. Bettencourt is a physicist, urban and complex systems researcher, author and academic. He is a Professor of Ecology and Evolution and the College at the University of Chicago as well as an Associate Faculty of the Department of Sociology and External Professor at the Santa Fe Institute.

Bettencourt's research focuses on the theory and modeling of complex systems, particularly the structure and growth of cities, integrating interdisciplinary concepts, mathematical modeling, and new technologies to foster sustainable development. He has published journal articles and a book entitled Introduction to Urban Science: Evidence and Theory of Cities as Complex Systems.

== Early life and education ==
Bettencourt grew up in Lisbon, Portugal, where he completed his undergraduate degree in Engineering Physics at IST Lisbon. He went on to earn a PhD in Theoretical Physics from Imperial College London and has held postdoctoral and research positions at the University of Heidelberg in Germany, Los Alamos National Laboratory, MIT, and the Santa Fe Institute.

== Career ==
Bettencourt began his career as a Technical Staff Member at Los Alamos National Laboratory (LANL) in the Computer and Computational Division from 2003 to 2005, followed by his role as research scientist in the Theoretical Division, where he remained until 2011. In 2011, he joined the Santa Fe Institute as a Professor of Complex Systems, a position he held until 2017, and has been an External Professor since. Subsequently, in 2017, he transitioned to the University of Chicago, where he became a professor in the Department of Ecology and Evolution and the College, an associate faculty member in the Department of Sociology, and the inaugural faculty director of the Mansueto Institute for Urban Innovation, a role he served in until July 2023.

As the founding director of the Mansueto Institute at the University of Chicago, he established the institute as a center for urban science, research, and practice. He developed projects, like the South Side Civic Scopeathon, Environmental Frontiers, and the Million Neighborhoods Initiative, which mapped informal settlements and underserved areas to enhance essential services access.

Bettencourt became a Kavli Fellow of the U.S. National Academies of Science in 2014. Later, he joined the President's Council of Advisors on Science and Technology's Working Group on "Technology and the Future of Cities". In 2019, he was elected as a member-at-large in the American Association for the Advancement of Science and was Member of the Executive Committee of the Center for Non-linear Studies at Los Alamos National Laboratory. He has formed collaborations with UN-Habitat.

== Research ==
Bettencourt's research has encompassed the study of cities as complex systems, aiming to understand the fundamental processes that create cities and drive urban dynamics, and to develop predictive theories of sustainable urban development. His contributions have been covered by news media outlets such as Forbes, Wired, Time, NPR, BBC, Harvard Business Review and The Economist.

=== Urbanization and complex systems ===
Bettencourt's work on cities and urbanization has focused on developing new theoretical frameworks for understanding and predicting many properties of cities, urban systems and development. Analyzing the growth, global reach, and interdisciplinary collaboration within sustainability science, he demonstrated its evolution into a distinct field emerging out of the integration of human, social, and ecological systems. In 2021, he published the textbook Introduction to Urban Science: Evidence and Theory of Cities as Complex Systems. Bernardo Alves Furtardo remarked, "the book is definitely worth reading for anyone interested in gaining a deeper understanding of the complex dynamics of cities and their citizens."

In a paper published in Science, Bettencourt proposed a theoretical framework based on universal principles to predict social, spatial, and infrastructural properties of cities. He further developed metrics that account for cities' nonlinear scaling, offering local performance measures and revealing a new taxonomy of U.S. cities by economic and social patterns. In addition, he investigated how urbanization drives economic development and knowledge creation globally, revealing that various city characteristics scale predictably with population size, impacting innovation and infrastructure differently. He has also collaborated with archeologists and anthropologists to demonstrate that the same principles of urban organization and development apply throughout history, in many different geographies and cultures.

=== Epidemiology ===
In epidemiology, Bettencourt has developed new approaches based on Bayesian learning and probabilistic modeling to improve models of disease spread, health surveillance, and intervention strategies. His work quantified the diffusion of new scientific ideas using epidemic models, finding that their adoption involved intentional social organization and extended lifetimes, unlike typical epidemics. Alongside Ruy M. Ribeiro, he presented a model for real-time monitoring of emerging infectious diseases, using surveillance data to estimate changes in transmissibility and predict new cases. Moreover, he introduced a quantitative approach for real-time adaptive health surveillance and control, using probabilistic models to predict new cases with quantified uncertainty, detect anomalies, and support interventions with interactive technology.

=== Evolutionary theory ===
Bettencourt has focused on understanding evolution as a mathematical and predictive theory. His research has compared and contrasted evolutionary theory with statistical mechanics in fields such as physics, economics, design, and theories of statistical learning and artificial intelligence. He has also explored issues of learning and information, cooperation, collective dynamics, levels of selection, and diversity across ecosystems and complex human societies.

== Bibliography ==
=== Books ===
- Introduction to Urban Science: Evidence and Theory of Cities as Complex Systems (2021) ISBN 978-0262046008

=== Selected articles ===
- Bettencourt, L. M., Lobo, J., Helbing, D., Kühnert, C., & West, G. B. (2007). Growth, innovation, scaling, and the pace of life in cities. Proceedings of the national academy of sciences, 104(17), 7301-7306.doi:10.1073/pnas.0610172104
- Bettencourt, L., & West, G. (2010). A unified theory of urban living. Nature, 467(7318), 912-913.doi:10.1038/467912a
- Bettencourt, L. M., Lobo, J., Strumsky, D., & West, G. B. (2010). Urban scaling and its deviations: Revealing the structure of wealth, innovation and crime across cities. PloS one, 5(11), e13541.doi:10.1371/journal.pone.0013541
- Bettencourt, L. M., & Kaur, J. (2011). Evolution and structure of sustainability science. Proceedings of the National Academy of Sciences, 108(49), 19540-19545.doi:10.1073/pnas.1102712108
- Bettencourt, L. M. (2013). The origins of scaling in cities. Science, 340(6139), 1438-1441.doi:10.1126/science.1235823
- Bettencourt, L. M. (2024). Recent achievements and conceptual challenges for urban digital twins. Nature Computational Science, 4(3), 150-153.doi:10.1038/s43588-024-00604-9
