= Bayesian learning mechanisms =

Bayesian learning mechanisms are probabilistic causal models used in computer science to research the fundamental underpinnings of machine learning, and in cognitive neuroscience, to model conceptual development.

Bayesian learning mechanisms have also been used in economics and cognitive psychology to study social learning in theoretical models of herd behavior.

== See also ==
- Active learning
- Bayesian learning
- Cognitive acceleration
- Cognitivism (learning theory)
- Constructivist epistemology
- Developmental psychology
- Fluid and crystallized intelligence
- Inquiry-based learning
- Kohlberg's stages of moral development
- Theory theory
