= Mirabelle Muûls =

Belgian economist

- Education: London School of Economics; Saint-Louis University
- Scientific career
- Workplaces: Imperial College London; London School of Economics
- Thesis: The interaction between firms and governments in climate change and international trade (2007)

Mirabelle Muûls is a Belgian economist who is professor and co-director of the Hitachi-Imperial Centre for Decarbonisation and Natural Climate Solutions at Imperial College London. Her research considers the economic implications of climate change.

== Early life and education ==
Muûls studied economics at Saint-Louis University, Brussels and UCLouvain. She moved to the London School of Economics for graduate studies, where she worked on the politics of global economies. Her doctorate explored the interactions governments and corporations in climate change.

== Research and career ==
In 2008, Muûls joined the Grantham Institute at Imperial College London. Here she was awarded an Imperial College Research Fellowship, where she started working with the Centre for Climate Change Economics and Policy. At Imperial, Muûls started a new teaching programme on Climate Change, Management and Finance.

Muûls serves as an associate professor at the Imperial College Business School. She serves as co-director of the Hitachi-Imperial Centre for Decarbonisation and Natural Climate Solutions. Her research looks to understand the economics of climate change. She has studied the energy demands of households, and how they respond to incentives (e.g. smart meters), as well as the interaction between governments, companies and the public during the climate catastrophe. She has studied whether dynamic pricing could be used to increase the proportion of renewable energy in the electricity grid. Supervisory control and data acquisition (SCADA) can be used to understand the power distribution network, helping countries manage electricity and adopt more sustainable energy solutions.

Muûls has studied whether carbon markets could help to alleviate climate change. She showed that creating the European carbon market reduced emissions by approximately 5.4 million tonnes of carbon each year. The introduction of carbon markets inspired companies to invest in clean technologies, and discouraged them from polluting industry.

== Awards and honours ==
- 2014 Robert Mundell Prize
- 2015 Erik Kempe Award in Environmental and Resource Economics
- 2018 Imperial College London President's Medal
- 2019 Finance for the Future Awards for “Climate Leadership”
- 2019 Finance for the Future Awards for “Driving Change through Education and Academia"

== Selected publications ==
- Muûls, Mirabelle (March 2015). "Exporters, importers and credit constraints". Journal of International Economics. 95 (2): 333–343. doi:10.1016/j.jinteco.2014.12.003. hdl:10044/1/18693. ISSN 0022-1996.
- Martin, Ralf; Muûls, Mirabelle; Wagner, Ulrich J. (2016-01-01). "The Impact of the European Union Emissions Trading Scheme on Regulated Firms: What Is the Evidence after Ten Years?". Review of Environmental Economics and Policy. 10 (1): 129–148. doi:10.1093/reep/rev016. hdl:10016/25235. ISSN 1750-6816.
- Muûls, Mirabelle; Pisu, Mauro (2007). "Imports and Exports at the Level of the Firm: Evidence from Belgium". SSRN Electronic Journal. doi:10.2139/ssrn.1004464. hdl:10419/144327. ISSN 1556-5068.
- Martin, Ralf; Muûls, Mirabelle; de Preux, Laure; Wagner, Ulrich (June 2013). Industry Compensation Under Relocation Risk: A Firm-Level Analysis of the EU Emissions Trading Scheme (Report). Cambridge, MA: National Bureau of Economic Research. doi:10.3386/w19097.
