= Alain Gringarten =

French scientist and professor (born 1945)

- Born: 26 Aug 1945; France
- Scientific career
- Fields: Oil well test analysis

Alain Gringarten (born 26 August 1945) is a French scientist, professor, and former Director of the Center for Petroleum Studies at Imperial College London.

== Career ==
Since 1997, Alain Gringarten has been Professor of Petroleum Engineering and Director of the Center for Petroleum Studies at Imperial College, London. He coordinates all research and postgraduate teaching and activities in petroleum-related studies at the College.

== Scientific contribution ==
Alain Gringarten made major contributions in many breakthrough advances in well test interpretation, including: the use of Greens functions; the "Gringarten type curves" for wells with wellbore storage and skin, fractured wells, and wells with double porosity behavior; the first major commercial computer-aided interpretation software; and a well-test interpretation methodology which has become standard in the oil industry. He was also an early pioneer of multidisciplinary studies, both in industry and in academia.

As a result, well-test analysis started becoming more useful as a reservoir-description tool, both during exploration and for reservoir simulation.

In recent years, Alain Gringarten spent a lot of time in research of deconvolution as a well-interpretation tool. He is one of the main contributors in establishing a stable algorithm of deconvolution as a least squares mathematical problem.

== Honours ==
Gringarten received the following honours and recognition for his achievements:

- 2007 Chairman, SPE Europec, London
- Chairman, SPE UK Workshops on Well Testing (2001), Gas Condensates (2002), Fractured Reservoirs (2003), Multilateral Wells (2004), Measurements while Drilling (2006) and Multilayered Reservoirs (2008).
- Co-convenor, EAGE-SPE workshop on Well Testing and Seismics (2009)
- 2009 Elected SPE Honorary Member
- 2009 SPE North Sea Service Award
- 2005 SPE Cedric Ferguson certificate for SPE best paper published in 2004
- 2003-2004 SPE Distinguished Lecturer
- 2003 SPE John Franklin Carl award for technical application and professionalism in petroleum development and recovery
- 2002 Elected SPE Distinguished Member
- 2001 SPE Formation Evaluation Award

== Publications ==
- Gringarten, A.C., Ramey, H.J., "Use of Source and Greens Functions in Solving Unsteady Flow Problems in Reservoirs", Soc Petrol Eng J, Vol:13, Pages:285-296, ISSN 0197-7520 (1973).
- Gringarten, A.C., Ramey, H.J., Raghavan, R, "Applied Pressure Analysis for Fractured Wells", J Petrol Technol, Vol:27, Pages:887-892, ISSN 0149-2136 (1975).
- Gringarten, A.C., "Interpretation of Tests in Fissured and Multilayered Reservoirs with Double-Porosity Behavior - Theory and Practice", J Petrol Technol, Vol:36, Pages:549-564, ISSN 0149-2136 (1984).
- Gringarten, A.C., "From Straight Lines to Deconvolution: the Evolution of the State of the Art in Well Test Analysis", paper SPE 102079, presented at the 2006 SPE Annual Technical Conference and Exhibition, San Antonio, Texas, U.S.A., 24–27 September 2006.
- Gringarten, A.C., Daungkaew, S., Hashemi, S. and Bozorgzadeh, M: "Well Test Analysis in Gas Condensate Reservoirs: Theory and Practice", paper SPE 100993, presented at the 2006 SPE Russian Oil and Gas Technical Conference and Exhibition, Moscow, Russia, 3–6 October 2006.

== Patents ==
- Gringarten, A.C., "Method for obtaining a dimensionless representation of well pressure data without the use of type-curves", United States Patent 4607524, 1986 (publication)
- Gringarten, A.C., "Method of determining characteristics of a fluid producing underground formation", United States Patent 4328705, 1982 (publication)

== See also ==
- Well control
