= Central Institute of Mining and Fuel Research =

Indian laboratory

- Motto: Mining for Sustainable Development, Energy for Growth
- Type: Public
- Established: 1946
- Chairman: Prime Minister of India
- Director: Arvind Kumar Mishra
- Address: Barwa Road, Dhanbad, Jharkhand, India; 23°49′1.51″N 86°25′39.59″E
- Campus: Urban
- Affiliations: AcSIR
- Website: cimfr.nic.in

CSIR-Central Institute of Mining and Fuel Research CSIR-CIMFR, previously known as Central Mining Research Institute and Central Fuel Research Institute, is based in Dhanbad, Jharkhand, India. It is a constituent laboratory of Council of Scientific & Industrial Research, an autonomous government body and India's largest research and development organisation. The establishment of CSIR-CIMFR was aimed to provide R&D inputs for the entire coal-energy chain from mining to consumption through integration of the core competencies of the two premier coal institutions of the country.

CSIR-Central Institute of Mining and Fuel Research, Dhanbad, a constituent laboratory under the aegis of Council of Scientific and Industrial Research, New Delhi aims to provide research and declopment for the entire coal-energy chain encompassing exploration, mining and utilization. The laboratory also strives to develop mineral based industries to reach the targeted production for the country's energy security and growth with high standards of safety, economy and cleaner environment. In view of the National Missions recently declared by the Government of India, CIMFR has realigned its vision, missions and policies and also redefined targets for short and long term. This would promote rapid sustainable national techno-economic growth with equal emphasis on self-sustenance. CSIR-CIMFR is located in the town of Dhanbad, known as coal capital of India of Jharkhand state of India. It is strategically situated in the Damodar basin of Eastern part of the country which is endowed with rich coal deposits and hosts several large mineral based industries.

== See also ==
- Council of Scientific & Industrial Research
