= Dewan Singh Bhakuni =

Indian chemist (1930–2021)

- Born: 30 December 1930; Uttar Pradesh, India
- Died: 22 April 2021 (aged 90)
- Education: Allahabad University; Imperial College London; University of London
- Known for: Studies on biogenesis of alkaloids
- Awards: 1975 Shanti Swarup Bhatnagar Prize; 1988 Ranbaxy Research Award; 1989 Sir C. V. Raman Award; 2000 Acharya P. C. Ray Memorial Award
- Scientific career
- Fields: Natural product chemistry; Bioorganic chemistry
- Workplaces: Central Drug Research Institute; National Botanical Research Institute; University of Concepción
- Doctoral advisor: Sir Derek Barton

Dewan Singh Bhakuni (30 December 1930 – 22 April 2021) was an Indian natural product chemist, stereochemist who was a director general-grade scientist of the Central Drug Research Institute. He is known for his researches on the biogenesis of alkaloids and is an elected fellow of the Indian Academy of Sciences, the National Academy of Sciences, India and the Indian National Science Academy. The Council of Scientific and Industrial Research, the apex agency of the Government of India for scientific research, awarded him the Shanti Swarup Bhatnagar Prize for Science and Technology, one of the highest Indian science awards, in 1975, for his contributions to chemical sciences.

== Biography ==
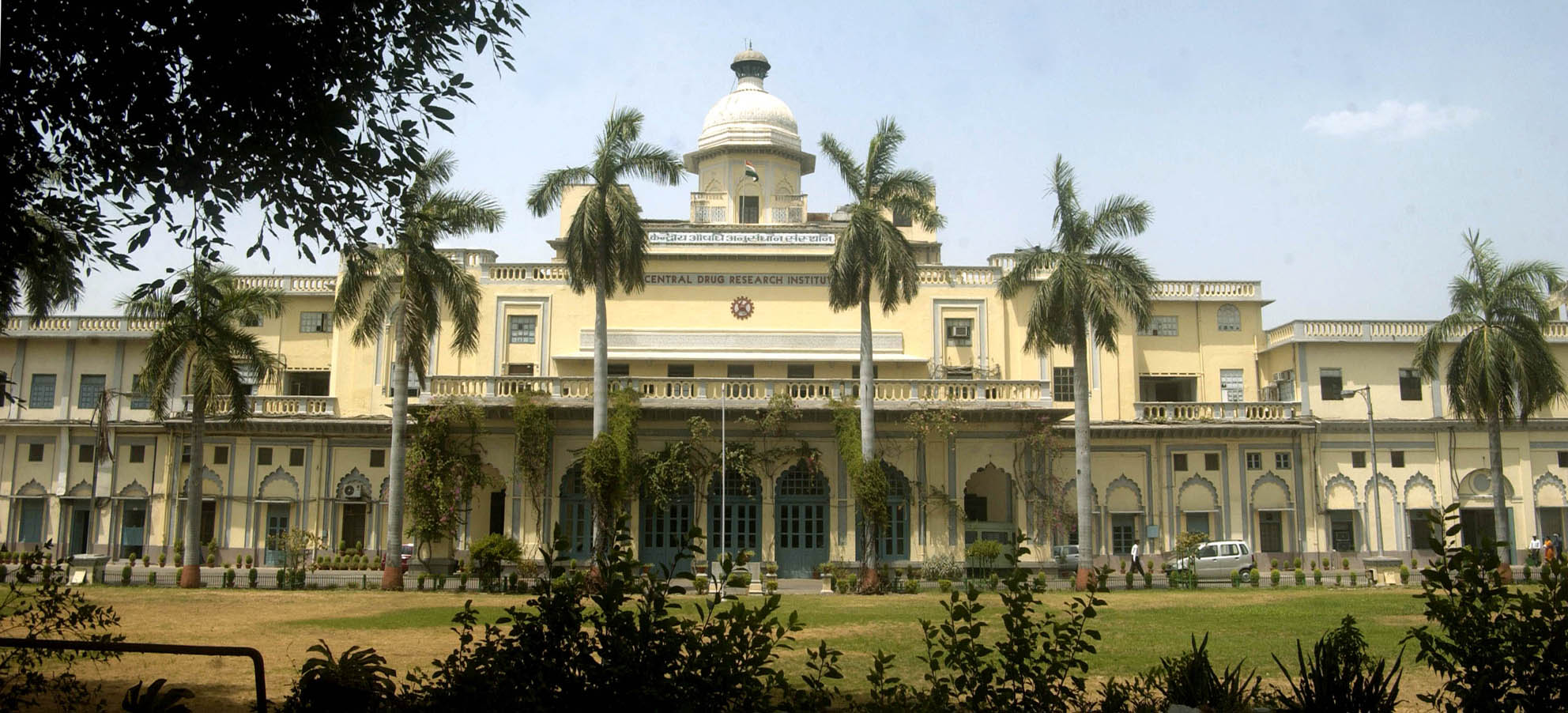
Central Drug Research Institute

D. S. Bhakuni, born on 30 December 1930 in the Indian state of Uttar Pradesh, graduated in chemistry from Allahabad University and completed his master's degree at the same institution. He started his career in 1958 as a teaching faculty but a year later, joined Central Drug Research Institute (CDRI), Lucknow and worked there for three years. His next move was to National Botanical Research Institute in 1962 but later went to the UK to pursue his doctoral studies. He secured a Phd in 1965 from the University of London under the guidance of Sir Derek Barton of Imperial College London, a renowned organic chemist and 1969 Nobel laureate; his thesis being Studies in alkaloid biosynthesis. He would also receive the degree of Doctor of Science from London University in 1978. Returning to India, he joined CDRI in 1965 where he spent the rest of his official career till his superannuation in 1990 as a director general-grade scientist. In between, he had a stint at University of Concepción, Chile as a visiting professor. Post-retirement, he was selected as an emeritus scientist by the Council of Scientific and Industrial Research. Bhakuni died on 22 April 2021, at the age of 90.

== Legacy ==
Bhakuni, during the course of his active researches, studied the structure and stereochemistry of several indigenous plants and synthesized them for finding out the biologically active compounds; his work on the biogenesis of alkaloids was based on these examinations. These studies are known to be pioneering studies on alkaloid biosynthesis and he developed a new methodology for determining the absolute configuration of alkaloids. Thus, he was able to identify the anti-cancer, anti-leishmanial, anti-viral and anti-allergic properties of a number of plants through mass spectrometric and Nuclear magnetic resonance spectroscopy techniques.

Bhakuni documented his researches in a book, Bioactive Marine Natural Products and over 300 articles published in peer-reviewed journals. (Note: Please see Selected bibliography section) His writings have been cited by several authors (Note: Please see Citations section) and he has mentored 40 doctoral scholars in their studies. A multidisciplinary program, under the title, Bioactive Substances from Indian Ocean was initiated by him during his days at the Central Drug Research Institute which is still active. He is a former president of the Indian Chemical Society (1996–97) and the Sectional Committee of Indian Science Congress Association (1994) and sat in the council of the Indian National Sciences Academy from 1982 to 1984.

== Awards and honors ==
The Council of Scientific and Industrial Research awarded Bhakuni the Shanti Swarup Bhatnagar Prize, one of the highest Indian science awards, in 1975. A University Grants Commission National Lecturer (1982), he received the Ranbaxy Research Award in 1988 and Sir C. V. Raman Award in 1989. He is also a recipient of Acharya P. C. Ray Memorial Award which he received in 2000. He has delivered a number of award orations; Platinum Jubilee Lecture of Indian Science Congress Association (1993) and Dr R. C. Shah Memorial Lecture of Bombay University (1993) are some of the notable ones among them. He is an elected fellow of all the three major Indian science academies, Indian National Science Academy, Indian Academy of Sciences and the National Academy of Sciences, India.

== Citations ==
- M. F. Grundon (January 1983). The Alkaloids. Royal Society of Chemistry. pp. 40–. ISBN 978-0-85186-367-2.
- R. B. Herbert (31 March 1989). Biosynthesis. Royal Society of Chemistry. pp. 220–. ISBN 978-0-85186-553-9.
- Chemistry and Pharmacology. Academic Press. 26 July 1996. pp. 334–. ISBN 978-0-08-086572-0.
- Dewan S. Bhakuni; D.S. Rawat (30 June 2006). Bioactive Marine Natural Products. Springer. pp. 101–. ISBN 978-1-4020-3484-8.
- Dewan S. Bhakuni; D.S. Rawat (30 June 2006). Bioactive Marine Natural Products. Springer. pp. 234–. ISBN 978-1-4020-3484-8.
- Guenter Grethe (15 September 2009). The Chemistry of Heterocyclic Compounds, Isoquinolines. John Wiley & Sons. pp. 379–. ISBN 978-0-470-18862-0.
- Heiz Ellenberg; Karl Esser; Klaus Kubitzki, Eberhard Schnepf, Hubert Ziegler (6 December 2012). Progress in Botany/Fortschritte der Botanik: Morphology · Physiology · Genetics Taxonomy · Geobotany / Morphologie · Physiologie · Genetik Systematik · Geobotanik. Springer Science & Business Media. pp. 98–. ISBN 978-3-642-68297-1.
- John Glasby (6 December 2012). Encyclopedia of the Alkaloids. Springer Science & Business Media. pp. 101–. ISBN 978-1-4615-9322-5.
- S.W. Pelletier (22 October 2013). Alkaloids: Chemical and Biological Perspectives. Elsevier. pp. 150–. ISBN 978-1-4832-8784-3.

== Selected bibliography ==
=== Books ===
- Bhakuni, Dewan S.; Rawat, D. S. (2006). Bioactive Marine Natural Products. Springer Netherlands. ISBN 978-1-4020-3472-5.

=== Articles ===
- Dewan S. Bhakuni; Awadhesh N. Singh; Sudha Jain (1980). "Biosynthesis of isotetrandrine". Tetrahedron. 36 (14): 2149–2151. doi:10.1016/0040-4020(80)80107-4.
- PP Gupta; RC Srimal; K Avasthi; N Garg; T Chandra; DS Bhakuni (1995). "Antiallergic activity of alkyl substituted pyrazolo [3, 4-d] pyrimidine (compound 88-765)". Indian Journal of Experimental Biology. 33 (1): 38–40. PMID 9135673.
- Biswas S, Sharma S, Saroha A, Bhakuni DS, Malhotra R, Zahur M, Oellerich M, Das HR, Asif AR (2013). "Identification of novel autoantigen in the synovial fluid of rheumatoid arthritis patients using an immunoproteomics approach". PLOS ONE. 8 (2) e56246. Bibcode:2013PLoSO...856246B. doi:10.1371/journal.pone.0056246. PMC 3572018. PMID 23418544.
- Sharma S, Ghosh S, Singh LK, Sarkar A, Malhotra R, Garg OP, Singh Y, Sharma RS, Bhakuni DS, Das TK, Biswas S (2014). "Identification of autoantibodies against transthyretin for the screening and diagnosis of rheumatoid arthritis". PLOS ONE. 9 (4) e93905. Bibcode:2014PLoSO...993905S. doi:10.1371/journal.pone.0093905. PMC 3979706. PMID 24714506.
- Kumar P, Bhakuni DS, Rastogi S (2014). "Diagnosis of Chlamydia trachomatis in patients with reactive arthritis and undifferentiated spondyloarthropathy". The Journal of Infection in Developing Countries. 8 (5): 648–654. doi:10.3855/jidc.3644. PMID 24820470.

== See also ==
- Sir Derek Barton
