= Cognitive acceleration =

Teaching approach to develop students' thinking abilities

Cognitive acceleration or CA is an approach to teaching designed to develop students' thinking ability, developed by Michael Shayer and Philip Adey from 1981 at King's College London . The approach builds on work by Jean Piaget and Lev Vygotsky and takes a constructivist approach.

== Theoretical background ==
From Piaget, CA recognises there are stages in intellectual development. At school the most important transition is from concrete thinking - which deals with facts and descriptions, to abstract thinking - any thinking which involves a mental process. From Vygotsky, CA takes the concept of Zone of Proximal Development (ZPD): the difference between what a learner can do with and without help. The CA method requires a mediator to ask questions that allow "guided self-discovery". Mediation is effective between peers and promotes the idea of pupils working in groups to solve a problem.

== Materials ==
The first teaching materials, written for Years 7 and 8 (ages 11–13) science lessons, were called Cognitive Acceleration through Science Education (CASE). After three years the results of intervening in science teaching in a dozen classes were compared with control classes which were taught in the usual way. The CASE learners not only scored about one grade better in their GCSE science, but Maths and English GCSE grades were improved by about the same amount. It is rare to see such ‘transfer’ of learning to other subjects in educational research.

Using the CA approach in teaching primary and secondary maths, known as CAME, produced similar results. Later development extended the range of lesson activities in primary science from the Foundation Stage through to year 5. Currently under development are activities for English at Key Stage 3. Several articles highlighting the effectiveness of CASE and CAME have appeared in the Times Educational Supplement (TES). Let's Think Forum (LT) produces CA packages for core subjects in primary and secondary education.

== Lesson structure ==
CA acknowledges a set of subskills which underpin abstract thinking and shares with constructivism the view that concepts cannot be learned in the same way as facts and descriptions. Learners need to "construct" meaning for themselves. Lessons centre on a challenge which can only be mastered by using an abstract idea. Early CASE lessons focus on: classification, scale, ratio, proportion, probability, variables, fair testing.

Role of the mediator

The teacher sets up good learning-context and intervenes to guide the learners toward the learning goal. A mediator asks probing questions: "What do you think?", "Which one will heat up most?" "What's happening to the atoms?" gradually leading the learners to discover the answer for themselves. The mediator can offer clues which direct the learner, improving the chance of successful thinking.

Lessons which develop abstract thinking directly have the following structure.

Setting the scene Concrete preparation serves a similar purpose to the "bridging" section and links the activity to current knowledge, explains the task and checks vocabulary.

Challenge Challenge must be set just above the current level of secure knowledge - hard enough to be a challenge, but not so hard as to make the learners switch off. In a science lesson this can take the form of a demonstration with an unexpected effect. In English it could be reading a text which has an implied meaning.

Group work The teacher cannot be the mediator for every child in the class. If pupils work in groups and discuss their ideas (social construction) there are several benefits:

- group members act as mediators for each other, suggesting solutions, trying out ideas.
- individuals feel less vulnerable and more able to participate.
- random ideas from group-members act as the clues offered by the mediator.

Plenary Once the groups have solutions, the class shares ideas. The teacher does not give the answer but asks a group for a solution, then asks another if they agree or disagree and why. The discussion continues until there is agreement. The teacher leads the group towards the answer through questioning.

Meta cognition During group-work and the plenary, the teacher asks questions that reveal the thinking process, meta-cognition, which has been shown to be effective in securing knowledge. The learner has to enunciate a line of thinking - making the process available to others.

Bridging Knowledge in isolation from the learner's secure knowledge is usually lost. The learner needs to bridge new learning to existing experiences. CA lessons conclude with a discussion about where ideas could be used in everyday life, the same concept as "scaffolding" in constructivism.

== Bibliography ==
- Adey, P. & Shayer, M. (1994) Really Raising Standards. London: Routledge
- Adey, P. (Ed.) (2008, forthcoming). Let's Think! Handbook: A Guide to Cognitive Acceleration in the Primary School. London: GL Assessment
- Shayer, M. & Adey, P.S, (2002) (eds.). Learning Intelligence: Cognitive Acceleration across the curriculum from 5 to 15 years. Milton Keynes: Open University Press.

For CASE

- Adey, P. S..(1993). Accelerating the development of formal thinking in Middle and High school students IV: three years on after a two-year intervention . Journal of Research in Science Teaching, 30, 4, 351–366.
- Shayer, M., (1999). Cognitive acceleration through science education II: its effects and scope. International Journal of Science Education, 21, (8), 883–902.
- Adey, P.S., Shayer, M. & Yates, C.(1989). Thinking Science: Student and Teachers' materials for the CASE intervention. London: Macmillan

For CAME

- Adhami, M., Johnson, D.C. & Shayer, M. (1995). Thinking Maths: The curriculum materials of the Cognitive Acceleration through Mathematics Education (CAME) project - Teacher's Guide. London: CAME Project/King's College.
- Adhami, M., Robertson, A., & Shayer, M.(2004). Let's Think Through Maths!: Developing thinking in mathematics with five and six-year-olds. London: nferNelson
- Adhami, M., Shayer, M., & Twiss, S.(2005). Let's Think through Maths! 6-9. London: nferNelson
