= Sonia Saxena =

British physician

- Occupation: Professor of Primary Care/ General Practitioner
- Awards: NIHR Senior Investigator (2023)

Academic background
- Education: Medical College of St Bartholomew's Hospital (MBBS); London School of Hygiene and Tropical Medicine; University of London
- Thesis: Family planning among South Asian women in the UK (2004)

Academic work
- Discipline: Primary care
- Sub-discipline: Child health Epidemiology Health equity
- Institutions: Imperial College London
- Website: https://www.imperial.ac.uk/people/s.saxena

Sonia Saxena FRCGP is a British physician who is Professor of Primary care and Director of the Child Health Unit at the School of Public Health, Imperial College London. She is a Fellow of the Royal College of General Practitioners and practises as a GP in Putney, London. She is known for her work in improving healthcare, and a focus on improving child health in the early years of life and reducing social inequalities.

== Education and career ==
Saxena came to the United Kingdom from India, studied medicine at the Medical College of St Bartholomew's Hospital in London, where she was awarded MBBS in 1989 and trained in the United Kingdom and Borneo. Saxena completed her training as a general practitioner in 1995 gaining her professional membership as a GP principal and awarded MRCGP. She qualified from the London School of Hygiene and Tropical Medicine gaining a MSc in Epidemiology in 1998. Starting in 2012, she set up and has served as director of the Imperial Child Health Unit at the School of Public Health, Imperial College London where she was promoted to Professor of primary care in 2017. She is a practising general practitioner with patients in Putney, London.

She is President for Child and Adolescent Public Health for the European Public Health Association, a position she will hold from 2020 until 2026. Saxena has been on numerous NHS committees, including chairing the NIHR national doctoral research panel, and in 2023 she was made a NIHR Senior Investigator.

== Academic work ==
Saxena is known for her work considering social aspects of medical care. Her doctoral work published in 2004 investigated social and cultural health determinants and health disparities among minority ethnic groups in the UK. She has investigated admission rates of children to hospitals and how hospital admissions vary as a function of financial status. Her work on childhood medicines includes penicillin dosing levels in children and impacts of health and preventive care such as vaccination rates. In adults, her research on alcohol consumption, has been discussed in the news by a range of views. During the Covid-19 pandemic, Saxena examined disruptions to children's healthcare and schooling from distancing measures and the role of primary care and public health agencies in the UK on maintaining uptake of routine and new vaccines.

== Awards and honors ==
Saxena presented a distinguished scholar lecture at the University of Florida in 2014. In 2019 she was nominated for an award as British Asian Woman of Achievement for Science by the Medical Women's Federation. In 2023 she was awarded NIHR Senior Investigator. Saxena gave an invited lecture as Barts alumna 'Primary care across the Millennium' in 2023 as part of the 900 year celebrations of Barts and the London history.

== Selected publications ==
- Saxena, S.; Ambler, G.; Cole, T. J.; Majeed, A. (2004-01-01). "Ethnic group differences in overweight and obese children and young people in England: cross sectional survey". Archives of Disease in Childhood. 89 (1): 30–36. ISSN 0003-9888. PMID 14709498.
- Koshy, E (2009). "Impact of the seven-valent pneumococcal conjugate vaccination (PCV7) programme on childhood hospital admissions for bacterial pneumonia and empyema in England: national time-trends study, 1997–2008". Thorax. 65 (9): 770–774. doi:10.1136/thx.2010.137802.
- Saxena, S. (2002-09-07). "Socioeconomic and ethnic group differences in self reported health status and use of health services by children and young people in England: cross sectional study". BMJ. 325 (7363): 520. doi:10.1136/bmj.325.7363.520. PMC 121333. PMID 12217992.
- Saxena, Sonia; Skirrow, Helen; Bedford, Helen (2020-06-16). "Routine vaccination during covid-19 pandemic response". BMJ. 369 m2392. doi:10.1136/bmj.m2392. ISSN 1756-1833. PMID 32546575.
