= Peter Ellaway =

British neuroscientist

Peter H. Ellaway is a British neuroscientist who is an emeritus professor of the Division of Neurosciences and Mental Health at Imperial College, London. His awards include the Commemoration Medal, Charles University, Prague (1988).

== External collaborations ==
- Balgrist Institute, Zurich, Prof Volker Dietz
- University of Alberta, Prof Arthur Prochazka

== Editorial boards ==
- Experimental Physiology, Reviewing Editor until 2005.
- Journal of Physiology, Senior Ethical Editor since 2005; Reviewing Editor since 1999.
