= Stephen Ramsey =

British scientific glassblower

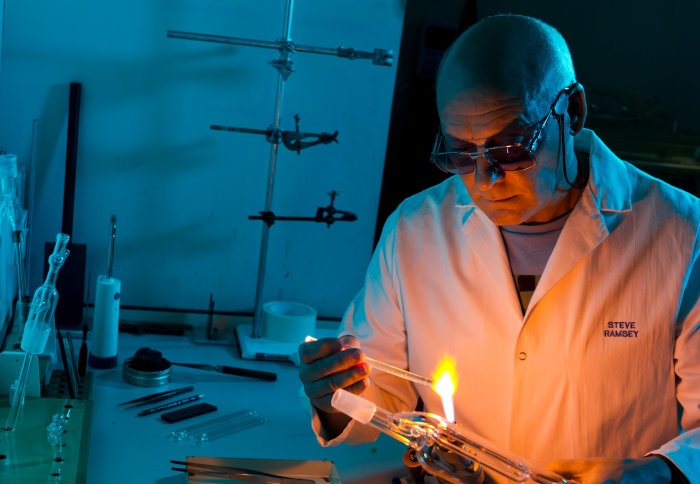
- Other name: Steve Ramsey
- Occupation: Scientific glassblower
- Employer: Imperial College London (former)

Stephen Ramsey is a British scientific glassblower. He spent about 50 years in industrial and academic labs as a glassblower. He is most prominent for his involvement at the Department of Chemistry at Imperial College London, where he repaired and crafted research lab glassware before retiring in 2018.

== Career ==
Ramsey left school at the age of fifteen. His first job was as a machine setter in a glassworks factory. His mother answered a newspaper advert to be an apprentice scientific glassblower in the pharmaceutical firm May & Baker, where he worked for about 17 years making laboratory equipment out of glass.

He started at Imperial College London in 1986 as a scientific glassblower in the Chemistry Department. After some time with SmithKline Beecham, now GlaxoSmithKline, he rejoined Imperial in 2007 to manage the Chemistry Glassblowing Workshop until his retirement in 2018.

In 2013 he was featured in Chemistry World talking about the disappearance of scientific glassblowing. He mentioned his experience with the upkeep of Schlenk lines and a Toepler pump, as well as his collaboration with chemists on one-of-a-kind glass apparatus used in experimental work.

In 2017, the BBC Radio 4’s Inside Science aired a programme featuring footage of one of Ramsey’s glassblowing activities recorded in his workshop; the programme described him as the final scientific glassblower at Imperial College.

== Professional recognition ==
In 2013, “dream job” in New Scientist featured a short piece where Ramsey talked about working as a scientific glass blower. In 2016, another New Scientist article reported how few scientific glass blowers were left working in scientific labs, as Ramsey did at Imperial College.

In 2015, Ramsey obtained the certificate of Registered Science Technician (RSciTech) through the award scheme made available by the Science Council. He was one of the first Imperial College technicians to attain this status. In 2018, he obtained the title of Registered Scientist (RSci) from the Royal Society of Chemistry.
