= Patricia Rankin =

British high energy physicist

- Education: Imperial College London
- Scientific career
- Workplaces: Arizona State University; National Science Foundation; University of Colorado Boulder; The Queen's School, Chester

Patricia Rankin is a British high energy physicist, equity researcher and Chair of the Department at the Arizona State University. Her research considers high energy particle physics and gender balance in scientific disciplines. She was previously responsible for the high energy physics section of the National Science Foundation.

== Early life and education ==
Rankin is from the United Kingdom. For her high school studies Rankin attended The Queen's School, Chester. Rankin eventually went on to study physics at Imperial College London. In 1978 she was awarded the Governor's Prize for outstanding academic achievement. She remained at Imperial College London for her graduate studies, specialising in high energy particle physics. Her doctoral research considered high energy particle physics. She has said that her professors encouraged her to stay in physics and pursue a research career. After graduating, Rankin moved to the United States. Here she joined the SLAC National Accelerator Laboratory, where she worked as a research associate on SLAC's Mark II detector.

== Research and career ==
Rankin was appointed to the faculty at the University of Colorado Boulder in 1988, where she was eventually promoted to Professor in 2002. When she joined CU Boulder she was the only woman on the physics faculty. In her early career, Rankin spent two years at the National Science Foundation where she oversaw the high energy physics portfolio.

At the University of Colorado Boulder Rankin created the Leadership Education for Advancement and Promotion (LEAP) programme, which became and institutionalised initiative in 2008. The programme supports pre-tenure and tenured faculty, providing professional development courses in leadership and time management. In 2008 Rankin was awarded an NSF ADVANCE Institutional Transformation Award that looked to increase the representation of women on the physics faculty. Rankin focussed on evidence-based approaches to improve the recruitment and retention of women physicists. In a talk about her gender equality work at Stanford University Rank said,

“The time has come for us to admit the failings of the classical system and start thinking like modern physicists. We need to acknowledge that multiple paths may be followed (some more probable than others) and take a quantum mechanical approach that allows people to tunnel into or back into physics careers through classically forbidden regions--like taking extended time off for parental leave,”.

She served as the Chair of the American Physical Society Committee on the Status of Women in Physics.

== Select publications ==
=== Book ===
- Pain, H. John; Rankin, Patricia (2015). Introduction to Vibrations and Waves. John Wiley. ISBN 978-1-118-44110-7.

=== Articles ===
- Robyn Marschke; Sandra Laursen; Joyce McCarl Nielsen; Patricia Rankin (January 2007). "Demographic Inertia Revisited: An Immodest Proposal to Achieve Equitable Gender Representation among Faculty in Higher Education". The Journal of Higher Education. 78 (1): 1–26. doi:10.1080/00221546.2007.11778961. ISSN 0022-1546. Wikidata Q62877754.
- Nielsen, Joyce McCarl; Marschke, Robyn; Sheff, Elisabeth; Rankin, Patricia (1 September 2005). "Vital Variables and Gender Equity in Academe: Confessions from a Feminist Empiricist Project". Signs: Journal of Women in Culture and Society. 31 (1): 1–28. doi:10.1086/431371. ISSN 0097-9740. S2CID 144932377.
- Rankin, P.; Bricaud, B.; Gravina, M.; Kunz, P. F.; Oxoby, G.; Trang, Q.; Ferran, P. M.; Fucci, A.; Hinton, R.; Jacobs, D.; Martin, B. (1985). "The 3081/E Processor and Its on-Line Use". IEEE Transactions on Nuclear Science. 32 (4): 1321–1325. Bibcode:1985ITNS...32.1321R. doi:10.1109/TNS.1985.4333602. ISSN 1558-1578. S2CID 24163878.
