= Ann Heinson =

British-American physicist

Ann Heinson is an American high-energy particle physicist known for her work on single top quark physics. She established and led the DØ Single Top Group which first published experimental observations of the top quark, and in 1997 she co-authored a paper which laid the foundations for further investigation into the top quark.

== Early life and education ==
Heinson grew up in Billericay, S.E. England. She earned both her B.Sc. in physics (1984) and Ph.D. in High Energy Physics (1988, advisor Peter Dornan) from Imperial College.

== Career and research ==
Heinson worked for the BBC's engineering research department before emigrating to California in 1989. There, she worked as a postdoctoral researcher at UC Irvine on a rare kaon decay experiment E791 at Brookhaven National Laboratory. In 1992, she began working at the University of California Riverside as a Research Physicist where she worked on the DØ collaboration at Fermi National Accelerator Laboratory. She established and led the DØ Single Top working group from 1995 to 2009. In 1997, she co-authored the paper "Single Top Quarks at the Fermilab Tevatron," which laid the conceptual foundations for the next decade of top quark experimental research. The observation of the production of single top quarks resulted from proton-antiproton collisions measured by the DZero detector which is the world's highest-energy particle collider. In 2009, under her leadership the DØ published its first ever observation of single top quark production. Under her leadership, the single top working group discovered the first evidence of single top quark production at Fermi Labs Tevatron. Through 2008-11 Heinson was a fellow in the Division of Particles and Fields Distinction and organization under American Physical Society From 2010 to 2012 Heinson was participated in the American Association For The Advancement of Science as a fellow in section on Physics. After 20 years of research at the University of California Riverside, she retired in 2012.

== Honors and awards ==
- American Physical Society's Woman Physicist of the Month (July 2012)
- Fellow of the American Association for the Advancement of Science (December 2010)
- Fellow of the American Physical Society (November 2008)
- UC Riverside Distinguished Researcher Award for Non-Senate Faculty (September 2002)
