= Dorian Haskard =

British rheumatologist, author, and academic

- Occupations: Rheumatologist, author, and academic

Academic background
- Education: BA; MBBS; MRCP; MA; DM
- Alma mater: University of Oxford; University of London

Academic work
- Institutions: Imperial College London

Dorian Haskard is a rheumatologist, author, and academic. He is an emeritus professor at Imperial College London.

Haskard is an elected fellow of the Royal College of Physicians, the Linnean Society of London and the United Kingdom Academy of Medical Sciences.

== Education ==
Haskard studied at the University of Oxford, where he earned a BA in Physiology and Psychology in 1973. He then pursued medicine at the Middlesex Hospital Medical School, University of London, graduating with an MBBS in 1977. In 1981, he became a Member of the Royal College of Physicians of London after passing its membership examination. He was later awarded a Doctorate in Medicine by the University of Oxford in 1989.

== Clinical and academic work ==
Haskard was awarded an Arthritis and Rheumatism Council (Versus Arthritis) Research Fellowship at the Bone and Joint Research Unit of the London Hospital Medical College, where he trained in the generation of monoclonal antibodies. He was later appointed to the University of Texas Southwestern Medical School, where he worked in the laboratory of Morris Ziff. His research identified the role of the adhesion protein LFA-1 in lymphocyte adherence to unstimulated endothelial cells and revealed a novel adhesion mechanism induced by interleukin-1, later attributed to VCAM-1. Upon returning to the UK, he was awarded a Wellcome Trust Senior Clinical Fellowship at Guy's Hospital in 1987, where he developed a panel of monoclonal antibodies against endothelial cell surface antigens. Using these antibodies, he conducted histological studies that demonstrated increased adhesion molecule expression in atherosclerosis.

In 1990, Haskard was appointed senior clinical lecturer at the Royal Postgraduate Medical School (RPMS) at Hammersmith Hospital, and later became professor of rheumatology and the British Heart Foundation Sir John McMichael Chair in Cardiovascular Medicine in 2016. Following the incorporation of RPMS into Imperial College, his research focused on the role of inflammation in vascular disease. His work included studies on molecular imaging of vascular endothelium during inflammation, the inflammatory potential of vascular calcification in atherosclerotic plaques, the protective role of IgM antibodies in atherosclerosis, the post-transcriptional regulation of tissue factor expression, and the detection of antibodies to oxidized low-density lipoproteins for cardiac risk classification. He served as chairman of the British Atherosclerosis Society from 2008 to 2010.

Haskard's clinical practice centered on inflammatory disorders of the vascular system, particularly Behçet's disease, and his research group was among the first in the UK to study its mechanisms. From 2013 to 2017, he led the rheumatology theme within Imperial College Healthcare NHS Trust. He also served as president of the International Society for Behçet's Disease from 2018 to 2022. In 2007, he delivered the British Society for Rheumatology's Heberden Oration.

Between 2004 and 2017, Haskard headed the Vascular Sciences Section of the National Heart and Lung Institute. He subsequently led the Division of Immunology and Inflammation from 2010 to 2017, and the Division of Clinical Cardiovascular Science from 2017 to 2018. He served as consul for the Faculty of Medicine in 2019, and as proconsul from 2022 to 2025. He also established the annual Imperial College Science in Medicine School Team Prize and currently holds the title of emeritus professor at Imperial College.

In 2025, Haskard published The Gout: A Medical Microcosm in a Changing World, which explored how 'the Gout' as a medieval concept was distilled into gout as a modern disease.

== Awards and honors ==
- 1989 – Michael Mason Prize, The British Society for Rheumatology
- 1991 – Honorary Membership, New Zealand Rheumatology Society
- 1994 – Fellowship, Royal College of Physicians
- 2001 – Fellowship, Academy of Medical Sciences
- 2019 – Fellowship, Linnean Society of London

== Bibliography ==
=== Books ===
- Haskard, Dorian (2025). The Gout: A Medical Microcosm in a Changing World. World Scientific Publishing Europe. ISBN 978-1800616486.

=== Selected articles ===
- Haskard, D.O.; Gul, V.; Morgan, A.; Kataaha, P.; Staines, N.A.; Archer, J.R. (1985). "Human monoclonal antibodies from patients with rheumatoid arthritis: cross reactions against cellular constituents". Clinical and Experimental Immunology. 61 (3): 496–502. PMC 1577268. PMID 3907900.
- Haskard, D.; Cavender, D.; Beatty, P.; Springer, T.; Ziff, M. (1986). "T lymphocyte adhesion to endothelial cells: mechanisms demonstrated by anti-LFA-1 monoclonal antibodies". The Journal of Immunology. 137 (9): 2901–2906. doi:10.4049/jimmunol.137.9.2901. PMID 2428877.
- Wellicome, S.M.; Thornhill, M.H.; Pitzalis, C.; Thomas, D.S.; Lanchbury, J.S.S.; Panayi, G.S.; Haskard, D.O. (1990). "A monoclonal antibody that detects a novel antigen on endothelial cells that is induced by tumor necrosis factor, IL-1, or lipopolysaccharide". The Journal of Immunology. 144 (7): 2558–2565. doi:10.4049/jimmunol.144.7.2558. PMID 2108206.
- Norris, P.; Poston, R. N.; Thomas, D. S.; Thornhill, M.; Hawk, J.; Haskard, D. O. (1991). "The expression of endothelial leukocyte adhesion molecule-1 (ELAM-1), intercellular adhesion molecule-1 (ICAM-1), and vascular cell adhesion molecule-1 (VCAM-1) in experimental cutaneous inflammation: a comparison of ultraviolet B erythema and delayed hypersensitivity". Journal of Investigative Dermatology. 96 (5): 763–770. doi:10.1111/1523-1747.ep12471720. PMID 1708800.
- Poston, R. N.; Haskard, D. O.; Coucher, J. R.; Gall, N. P.; Johnson-Tidey, R. R. (1992). "Expression of intercellular adhesion molecule-1 in atherosclerotic plaques". The American Journal of Pathology. 140 (3): 665–673. PMC 1886152. PMID 1372160.
- Mason, J. C.; Kapahi, P.; Haskard, D. O. (1993). "Detection of increased levels of circulating intercellular adhesion molecule 1 in some patients with rheumatoid arthritis but not in patients with systemic lupus erythematosus. Lack of correlation with levels of circulating vascular cell adhesion molecule 1". Arthritis & Rheumatism. 36 (4): 519–527. doi:10.1002/art.1780360412. PMID 7681283.
- Jamar, F.; Chapman, P. T.; Manicourt, D. H.; Glass, D. M.; Haskard, D. O.; Peters, A. M. (1997). "A comparison between 111In-anti-E-selectin mAb and 99Tcm-labelled human non-specific immunoglobulin in radionuclide imaging of rheumatoid arthritis". The British Journal of Radiology. 70 (833): 473–481. doi:10.1259/bjr.70.833.9227228. PMID 9227228.
- Nadra, I.; Mason, J. C.; Philippidis, P.; Florey, O.; Smythe, C. D. W.; McCarthy, G. M.; Landis, R. C.; Haskard, D. O. (2005). "Proinflammatory activation of macrophages by basic calcium phosphate crystals via protein kinase C and MAP kinase pathways: a vicious cycle of inflammation and arterial calcification?". Circulation Research. 96 (12): 1248–1256. doi:10.1161/01.RES.0000171451.88616.c2. PMID 15905460.
- Lewis, M. J.; Malik, T. H.; Ehrenstein, M. R.; Boyle, J. J.; Botto, M.; Haskard, D. O. (2009). "Immunoglobulin M is required for protection against atherosclerosis in low-density lipoprotein receptor–deficient mice". Circulation. 120 (5): 417–426. doi:10.1161/CIRCULATIONAHA.109.868158. PMC 2761224. PMID 19620499.
- Iqbal, M. B.; Johns, M.; Cao, J.; Liu, Y.; Yu, S. C.; Hyde, G. D.; Laffan, M. A.; Marchese, F. P.; Cho, S. H.; Clark, A. R.; Gavins, F. N.; et al. (2014). "PARP-14 combines with tristetraprolin in the selective posttranscriptional control of macrophage tissue factor expression". Blood. 124 (24): 3646–3655. doi:10.1182/blood-2014-07-588046. PMC 4256914. PMID 25293769.
