= Clementine Chambon =

Chemical engineer

- Education: University of Cambridge Imperial College London
- Occupation: Chemical engineer
- Employer: Imperial College London
- Known for: Clean energy solutions Off-grid power

Clementine Chambon is a chemical engineer at Imperial College London, who works on energy solutions for energy-deprived countries. She is the Chief Technology Officer (CTO) of Oorja Development Solutions, a social enterprise that focused on providing clean energy access to off-grid communities in rural India.

== Education ==
Chambon completed her Masters in Chemical Engineering at the University of Cambridge in 2014. During her degree, she was an intern at Mars Petcare in Verden, Northern Germany. She was awarded a graduate prize from the Salters' Institute of Industrial Chemistry. Subsequently, Chambon completed her PhD in lignocellulosic biofuels in 2017, funded by an Imperial College President's PhD Scholarship and the Grantham Institute for Climate Change.

== Research ==
Chambon received an Echoing Green Climate Fellowship with a grant of $90,000 in 2015. She has a technical experience with biomass gasification systems and deployment of viable emerging decentralised energy solutions. In 2017, she won the Institution of Chemical Engineers Young Researcher Award. She is an EPSRC doctoral prize fellow at Imperial College London working on biomass gasification and its application for rural electrification.

== Oorja Development Solutions ==
Chambon is the co-founder and chief technology officer of Oorja. She says that she came up with Oorja during Climate-KIC Journey, a summer school that teaches climate entrepreneurship, in August 2014. Oorja provides clean energy and biochar to rural off-grid communities in India. Chambon is responsible for the design and building of Oorja's easily operable mini-power plants, which transform agricultural waste into affordable electricity and can be run by local people. Oorja's mission is to impact one million people by 2025. They subsidise electricity for low-income households, women-led households, schools, health centres and off-grid street lights.

In 2016, Chambon was included Forbes' 30 Under 30 List for top Social Entrepreneurs. She was also listed in MIT Technology Review's list of French innovators under 35 years old. In 2017, Oorja used electrified 100 homes in Uttar Pradesh's Sarvantara Village, providing energy for 1,00 people.
