= Derek L. G. Hill =

British professor of medical imaging

Derek L. G. Hill is professor of medical imaging at University College London (UCL).

He earned a B.Sc. (physics) from Imperial College London in 1987, an M.Sc. degree (medical physics) from the University of Surrey in 1989, and a Ph.D. from the United Medical and Dental Schools of Guy's and St Thomas' Hospitals (UMDS), University of London, in 1994.

== Selected publications ==
- Combination of 3D medical images from multiple modalities. University of London, London, 1994.
