= Nicholas Harrison (physicist) =

Prof. Nicholas Mark Harrison
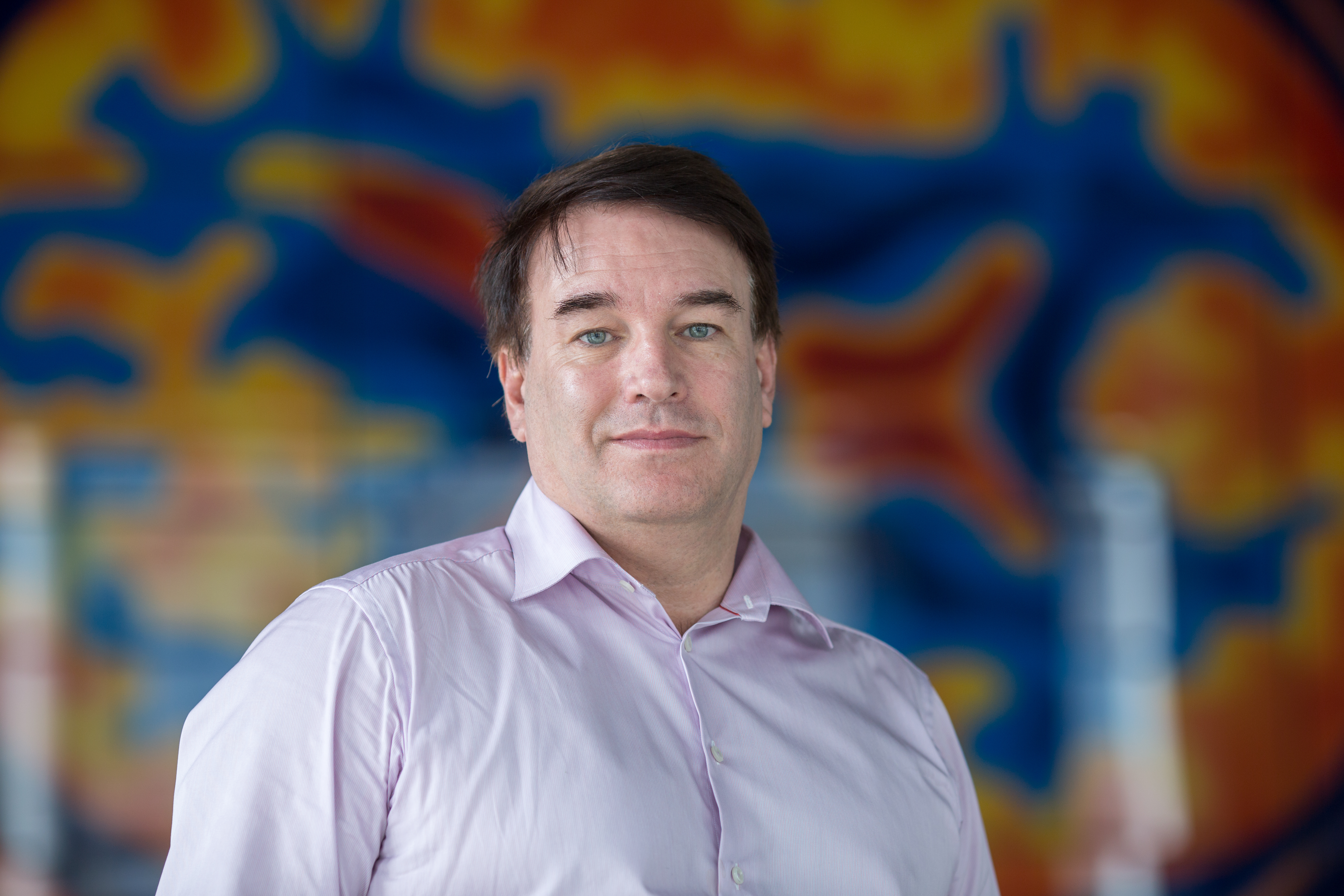
- Prof. Nic Harrison in 2017
- Born: 5 November 1964 (age 61)
- Education: University College London
- Known for: Density functional theory Crystals
- Scientific career
- Fields: Physicist
- Workplaces: Imperial College London; Daresbury Laboratory
- Thesis: The Effects of Substitutional Disorder on the Electronic Structure of Alloys (1990)
- Doctoral advisor: Robin Jordan; Paul Durham
- Website: www.imperial.ac.uk/people/nicholas.harrison www.imperial.ac.uk/computational-materials-science/

Nicholas Harrison FRSC FinstP (born 5 November 1964) is an English theoretical physicist known for his work on developing theory and computational methods for discovering and optimising advanced materials. He is the Professor of Computational Materials Science in the Department of Chemistry at Imperial College London where he is co-director of the Institute of Molecular Science and Engineering.

== Education ==
Harrison was educated at University College London and the University of Birmingham, graduating with a BSc in Physics in 1986 and a PhD in Theoretical Physics in 1989. He performed the research that led to his PhD within the Theory and Computational Science department at Daresbury Laboratory.

== Career ==
Nicholas Mark Harrison was born in Streetly, Sutton Coldfield, in the United Kingdom. His father was a manager at Lloyds Bank. He took a degree in physics at University College London and the University of Birmingham after which he was appointed as a research scientist at Daresbury Laboratory, spending a year in 1993 as a visiting scientist at Pacific Northwest National Laboratory. In 1994 he was appointed head of the Computational Materials Science Group at Daresbury Laboratory. In 2000 he became the Professor of Computational Materials Science at Imperial College London. He was elected a Fellow of the Institute of Physics in 2004 and a Fellow of the Royal Society of Chemistry in 2008. He is currently a co-director of the Institute for Molecular Science and Engineering at Imperial College London.

== Research ==
Harrison has authored or co-authored a wide range of articles.

Harrison's research career started with his PhD, which was concerned with developing a quantitative and predictive theory of the electronic states in substitutionally disordered systems. Harrison has furthered the practical use of quantum theory for predictive calculations in materials discovery and optimisation. He has developed methods for robust and efficient calculations on functional materials in which strong electronic interactions are dominant and used them to study processes in previously poorly understood materials such as transition metal oxides, oxide interfaces, and functional materials.

In doing so, he has made significant contributions to the understanding of catalysis and photocatalysis at surfaces, the stability of polar surfaces, spin dependent transport in low dimensional systems, high temperature magnetism in organic and metal-organic materials and the thermodynamics of energy storage materials. The techniques he has developed have consistently extended the state of the art and are now used world-wide in both academic and commercial research programmes.
