= Anita Holdcroft =

Anaesthetist; pain researcher

Anita Holdcroft FRCA
- Education: MB, ChB, MD
- Scientific career
- Fields: Pain
- Institutions: Imperial College London; Chelsea and Westminster Hospital
- Website: www.imperial.ac.uk/people/a.holdcroft

Anita Holdcroft FRCA is an Emeritus Professor of Anaesthetics at Imperial College London and Honorary Consultant at Chelsea and Westminster Hospital. She specialised in acute pain in women and was the first to study the changes that occur in the brain during parturition.

== Education ==
Holdcroft holds Bachelor of Medicine, Bachelor of Surgery (MB, ChB) and Doctor of Medicine (MD) degrees.

== Research and career ==
Holdcroft has held many notable positions, including serving as the President of the Royal Society of Medicine (RSM) forum on maternity and the newborn, the Committee Member of the Obstetric Anaesthetists Association, British Medical Association (BMA ) medical academic staff Committee and as Chair of the Europain Visceral Pain Group. Her research considered the representation of gender and sex dimensions in medical research. She was supported by the Medical Research Council (MRC) and the European Commission (EC).

She was the first secretary and subsequent Chair of the International Association for the Study of Pain (IASP) Special Interest Group (SIG) on Sex Gender and Pain. The group presented a report documenting sex and gender differences in pain and analgesia.

In the 1990s Holdcroft became interested in the use of cannabis in pain relief, and was one of the first UK doctors to perform clinical trials for the therapeutic use of the drug. She studied the impact of cannabis plant extract during surgery, leading a placebo-controlled study with patients suffering form chronic pain. She demonstrated that it does indeed provide pain relief, leading to a range of drugs that can be used for post-operative pain. She went on to investigate cannabis as a pain management strategy for patients with HIV

Holdcroft was the first researcher to study changes in the brain during and after pregnancy.

Holdcroft is an advocate for women in medicine. She studied the gender pay gap for women in academic medicine.

=== Publications ===
- Principles and practice of obstetric anaesthesia and analgesia
- Core Topics in Pain
- 2005 Sex and Gender Differences in Pain
- Crises in Childbirth Why Mothers Survive

=== Awards ===
Holdcroft is a Fellow of the Royal College of Anaesthetists (FRCA).
