= History of Imperial College London =

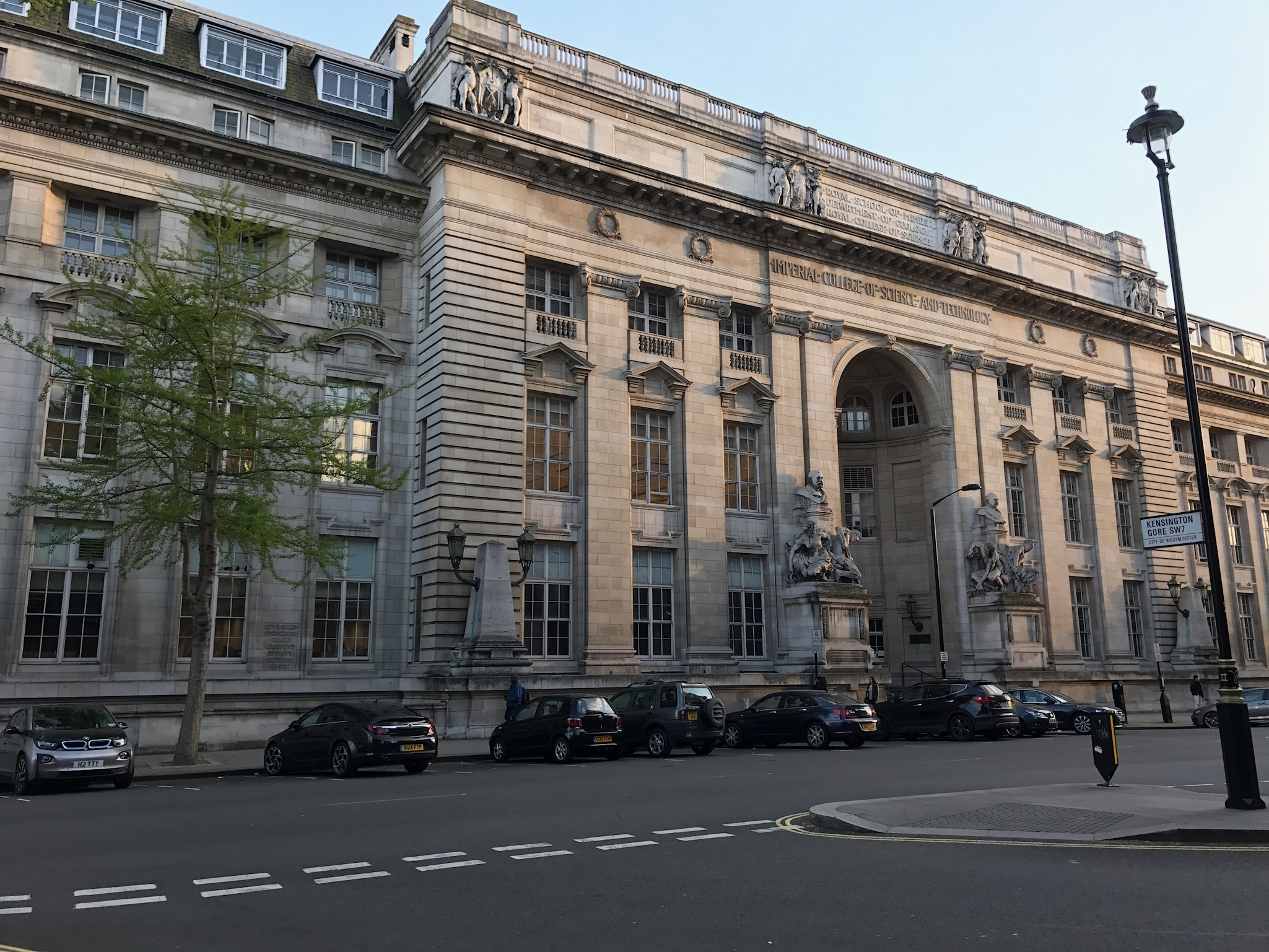
Royal School of Mines

The history of Imperial College London can be traced back to the founding of the Royal College of Chemistry in 1845 in London, with some ancestral medical schools dating back to 1823. The college was formed in 1907 out of the royal colleges in South Kensington, and throughout the 20th century became central to the national strategy for technical education and research. It existed for most of its life as part of the University of London, only becoming independent in 2007.

== Founding Colleges ==
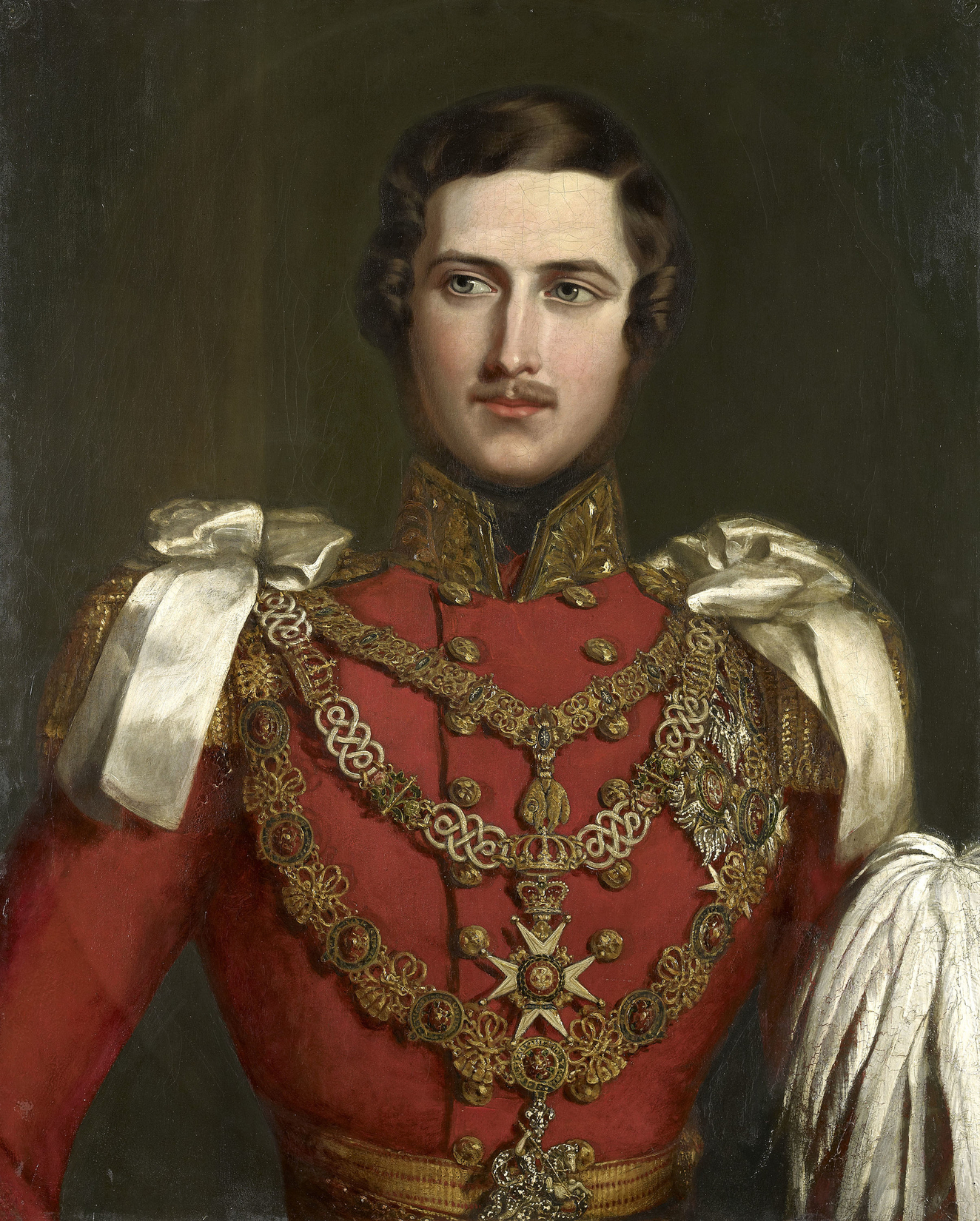
Albert, Prince Consort, led the Great Exhibition and the subsequent development of South Kensington, and the establishment of the Royal Colleges and a technological university in London.

The earliest college that led to the formation of Imperial was the Royal College of Chemistry, founded on Hanover Square in 1845, with the support of Prince Albert and parliament. Following some financial trouble, this was absorbed in 1853 into the newly formed Government School of Mines and Science Applied to the Arts, located on Jermyn Street. The school was renamed the Royal School of Mines a decade later.

The medical school has roots in many different school across London, the oldest of which dates back to 1823, with the foundation of the teaching facilities at the West London Infirmary at Villiers Street. Later known as Charing Cross Hospital Medical School, it was designed to provide medical education for the needs of a university. This was followed in 1834 when Westminster Hospital surgeons started taking students under their care. Established on Dean Street, the school was forced to close in 1847, but was reopened in 1849 with a new specimen museum. The first teaching at St Mary's Hospital in Paddington began in 1851, with St Mary's Hospital Medical School established in 1854.

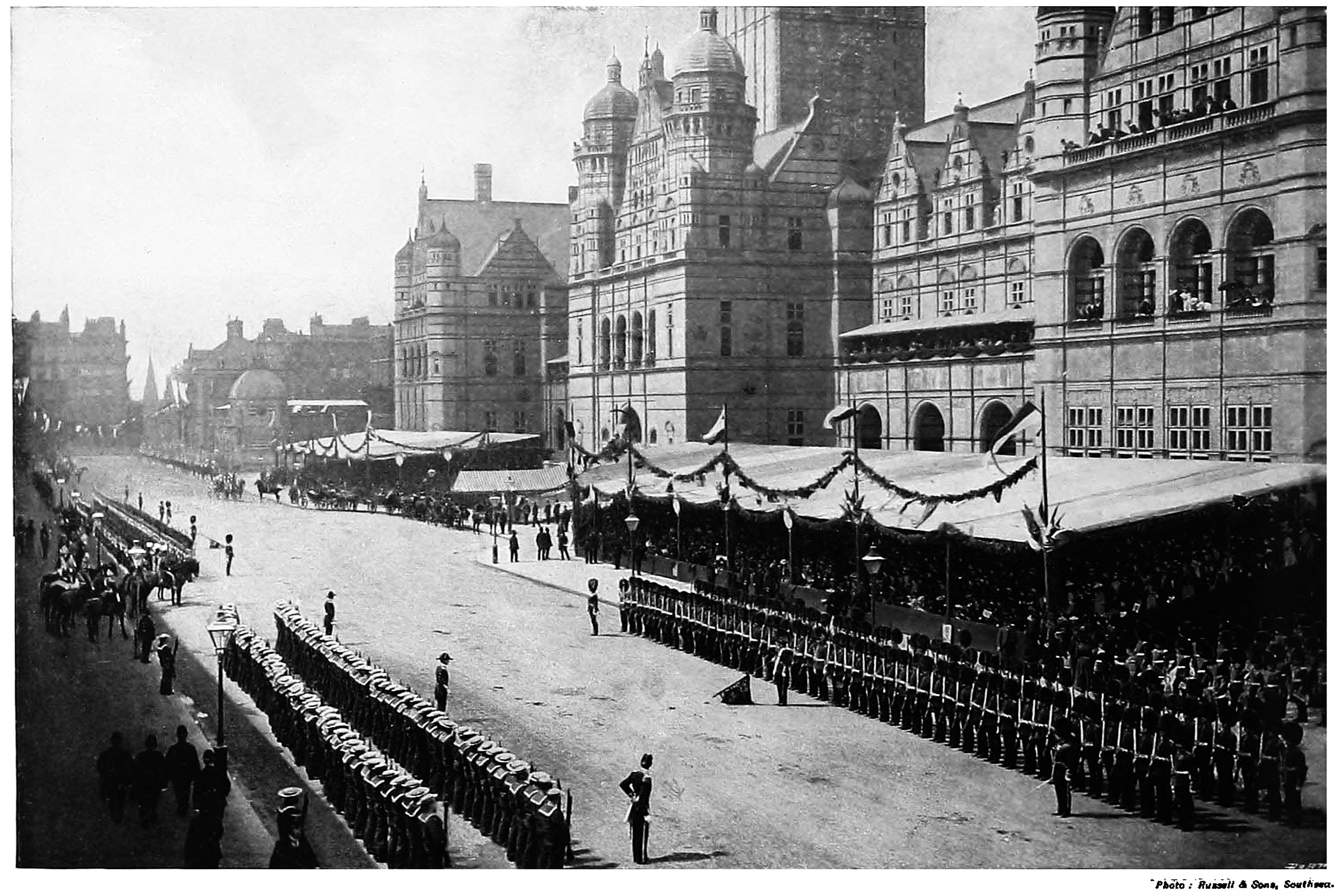
The Imperial Institute

=== The Great Exhibition ===
Proceeds from the Great Exhibition of 1851 were designated by Prince Albert to be used to develop a cultural area in South Kensington for the use and education of the public. Within the next 6 years the Victoria and Albert and Science museums had opened, joined by the Natural History Museum in 1881, and in 1888 the Imperial Institute. As well as museums, new facilities for the royal colleges were also constructed, with the Royal College of Chemistry and the Royal School of Mines moving to South Kensington between 1871 and 1872.

In 1881 the Normal School of Science was established in South Kensington under the leadership of Thomas Huxley, taking over responsibility for the teaching of the natural sciences and agriculture from the Royal School of Mines. The school was granted the name Royal College of Science by royal consent in 1890. As these institutions were not part of universities, they were unable to grant degrees to students, and instead bestowed associateships such as the Associateship of the Royal College of Science.

The Central Institution of the City and Guilds of London Institute, formed by the City of London's livery companies, was opened on Exhibition Road by the Prince of Wales, founded to focus on providing technical education, with courses starting in early 1885. The institution was renamed the Central Technical College in 1893, becoming a school of the University of London in 1900.

== 20th century ==
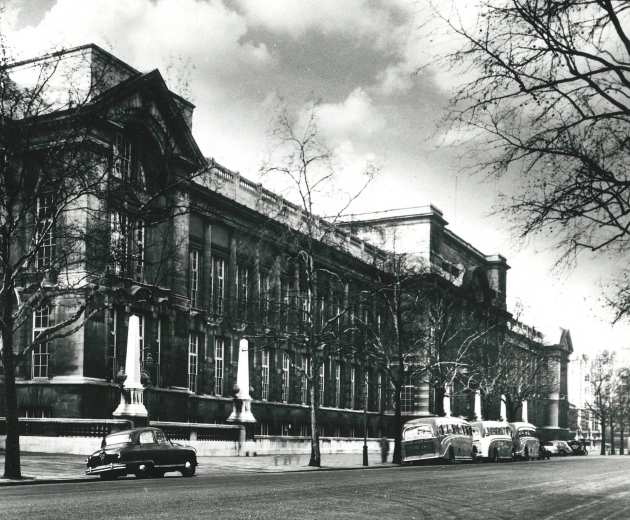
Royal College of Science

At the start of the 20th century there was a concern that Britain was falling behind its key rivals – particularly Germany – in scientific and technical education, and the idea grew for a "British Charlottenburg", similar to the German Technische Hochschule Charlottenburg. In 1902, the Technical Education Board of London County Council called for the establishment of a similar institute for advanced technological training in London, and Richard Haldane had involved Lord Rosebery, Arthur Balfour and the Duke of Devonshire in a scheme to raise £600,000 as a trust fund for the proposed institution.

A departmental committee was set up at the Board of Education in 1904, originally chaired by Francis Mowatt and (from 1905) by Haldane, officially to look into the future of the Royal College of Science. An interim report in 1905 asked if the government would support the unification of the two national schools of science in South Kensington – the Royal College of Science and the Royal School of Mines – into a single institution. This was followed in 1906 by the final report that called for the establishment of this unified institution, also to take in – if agreement could be reached with the City and Guilds of London Institute – their Central Technical College. The committee was divided on whether the new institution should be incorporated into the University of London or be associated as an independent college of the university, but recommended that the establishment of the new institution should not wait for this question to be settled.

On 8 July 1907, King Edward VII granted a Royal Charter establishing the Imperial College of Science and Technology. This incorporated the Royal School of Mines and the Royal College of Science. It also made provisions for the Central Technical College to join once conditions regarding its governance were met, as well as for Imperial to become a college of the University of London. The latter of these was accomplished within a year, with Imperial joining the University of London on 22 July 1908. The Central Technical College joined Imperial in 1910 under the name City and Guilds College. The main campus of Imperial College was constructed beside the buildings of the Imperial Institute.

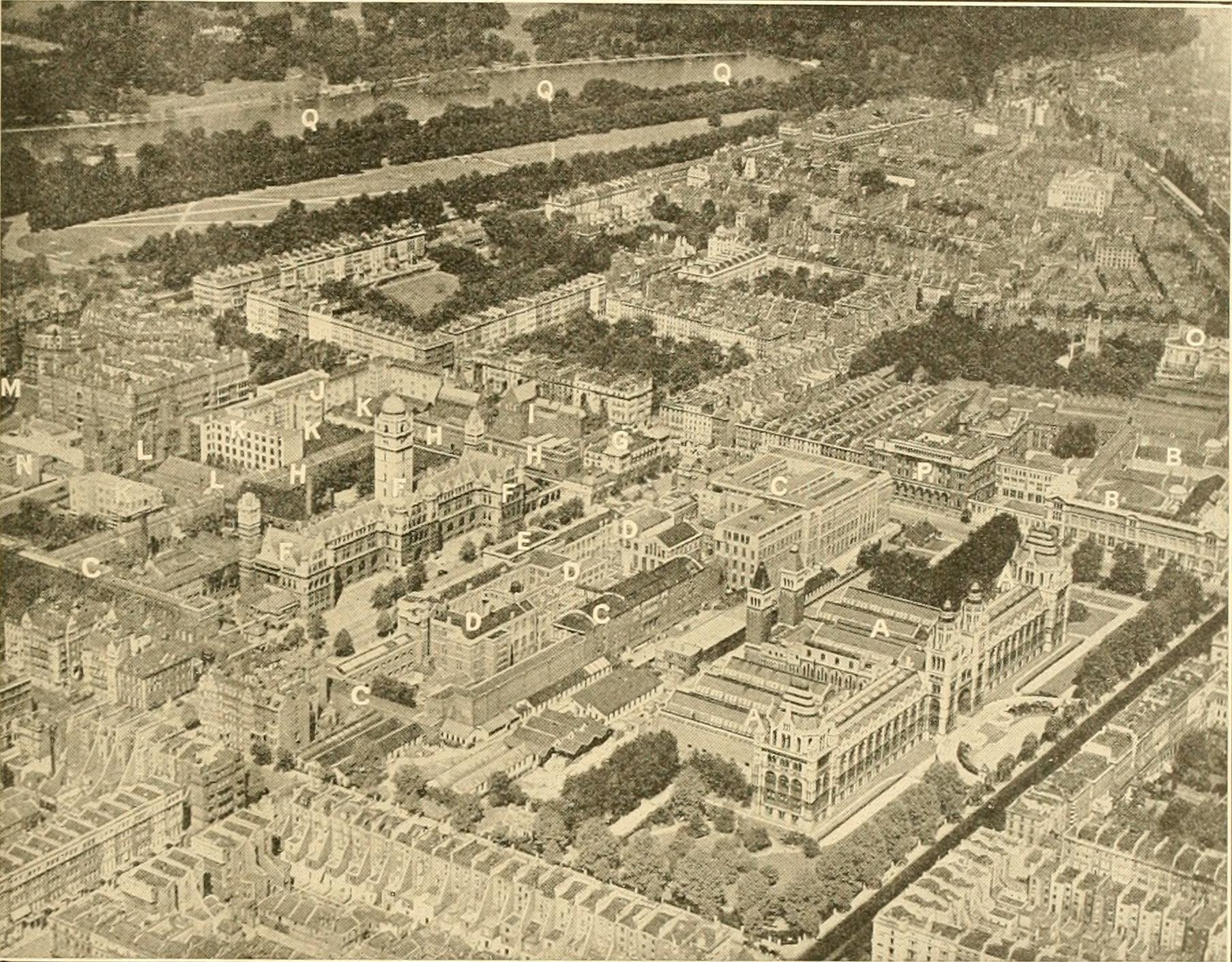
The college before its mid-20th century expansion

King Edward VII granted the coat of arms of the college on 6 June 1908 by royal warrant. The foundation stone for the Royal School of Mines building was laid by King Edward VII in July 1909. There was controversy over the inscription on the foundation stone, which was originally to commemorate "the completion of the Royal College of Science … henceforth to be known as the Imperial College of Science and Technology". This led to objections from the Royal School of Mines and the inscription being changed to commemorate instead "the new buildings of the Royal School of Mines … and of the City and Guilds College of Engineering, which, with the Royal College of Science, form integral parts of the Imperial College of Science and Technology".

While students at Imperial could study for University of London degrees, the three constituent colleges also awarded associateships at bachelor's level (Associateship of the Royal College of Science, ARCS, Associateship of the Royal School of Mines, ARSM, and Associateship of the City and Guilds of London Institute, ACGI). To these was added the Diploma of Imperial College (DIC), a postgraduate-level qualification first awarded in 1912.

It was not long before agitation for full university status began. In January 1919, students and alumni met at the Imperial College Union and voted to sign a petition to make Imperial a university with its own degree awarding powers, independent of the University of London. This won the backing of the rector and the professors, in addition to the majority of past and present students, and Nature called in 1920 for "a free and frank examination of the proposition in all its bearings, undisturbed and unprejudiced by lesser interests than that of increasing the efficiency of university education and especially of scientific education". One of the issues raised was that, as Imperial was unable to grant degrees, only diplomas, students were going to America to study. While Imperial did not gain its independence at this time, the University of London changed its regulations in 1925 so that the courses taught only at Imperial would be examined by the university, enabling students to gain a BSc.

In October 1945, King George VI and Queen Elizabeth visited Imperial to commemorate the centenary of the Royal College of Chemistry, which (as part of the Royal College of Science) was the oldest of the institutions that united to form Imperial College. "Commemoration Day", named after this visit, is held every October as the university's main graduation ceremony. The college also acquired a biology field station at Silwood Park near Ascot, Berkshire in 1947

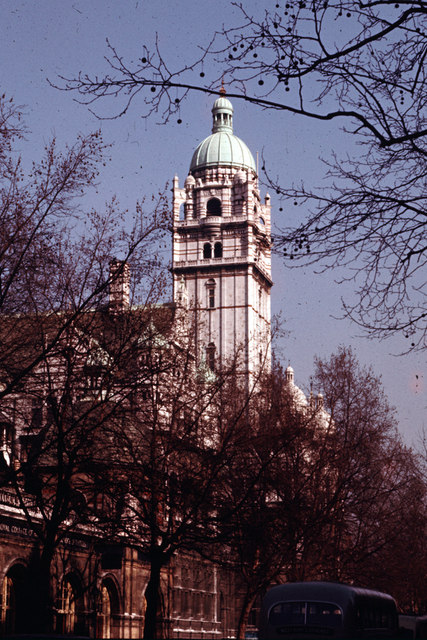
Queen's Tower as part of the Imperial Institute

=== Post-War expansion ===
Following the second world war, there was again concern that Britain was falling behind in science – this time to the United States. The Percy Report of 1945 noted that "there have been indications lately of a readiness of the English to move in the direction of American institutions, such as the Massachusetts Institute of Technology". The report of the Barlow Committee in 1946 advised doubling the number of graduates in science and technology and establishing a new technological university. The idea of a "British MIT" was backed by influential scientists as politicians of the time, including Lord Cherwell, Sir Lawrence Bragg and Sir Edward Appleton, but there was also strong opposition: the University Grants Committee (UGC) argued that "an institution confined to a narrow range of subjects is unfavorable to the highest attainment", while the Committee of Vice-Chancellors and Principals stated that "a single-faculty institution cannot be a university". In 1952, the government stated their intention of "building up at least one institution of university rank devoted predominantly to the teaching and study of the various forms of technology". However, the continued opposition of the UGC led to a compromise being announced in 1953: Imperial College would be expanded, almost doubling in size (from 1,650 to 3,000 students) over the next ten years, as the "institution of university rank" promised in the government's policy, but would remain part of the University of London rather than becoming an independent technological university.

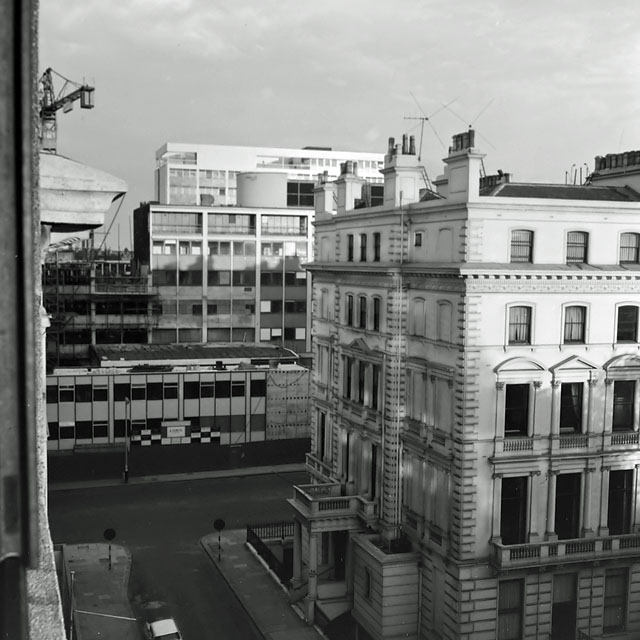
City & Guilds, 1964

The expansion of the college led to a number of new buildings being erected. These included the Hill building in 1957 and the Physics building in 1960, and the completion of the East Quadrangle, built in four stages between 1959 and 1965. The building work also meant the demolition of the City and Guilds College building in 1962–63. The Imperial Institute building was also demolished between 1957 and 1967, although it remained partly occupied by the institute until 1962. Opposition from the Royal Fine Arts Commission and others meant that the central tower (now the Queen's Tower) was retained, with work carried out between 1966 and 1968 to make it free standing.

New laboratories for biochemistry were established with the support of a £350,000 grant from the Wolfson Foundation in 1959, which was also instrumental in attracting Ernst Chain to Imperial to head the biochemistry department. The new buildings were opened by the Queen in 1965.

A special relationship between Imperial and the Indian Institute of Technology Delhi was established in 1963. Under this agreement, Imperial helped train Indian staff and academics from Imperial went on long term secondments to Delhi. In the same year, the Department of History of Science and Technology was established.

From 1965, the UGC allocated 'indicated' funding to Imperial. While the grant continued to come through the University of London, the federal university, was no longer free to decide on Imperial's allocation out of its block grant. As the university used its grant to cross-subsidise weaker components of the federation, leading to complaints that stronger colleges were losing out, this was a situation envied by the other colleges.

An agreement was made for the Architectural Association School of Architecture to join Imperial as a fourth constituent college, but this was dependent on the Architectural Association raising £500,000 for a new building and did not take place. By the late 1960s, government funding was no longer so readily available, and in 1969, Imperial launched an appeal for £2 million. Over half of this was to be spent on student accommodation, with the aim that students would spend at least one year in college-owned halls of residence, the rest to be spent supporting research and teaching and on developing the Silwood Park field station.

The Department of Management Science was created in 1971 out of the Management Engineering Section of the Mechanical Engineering Department. The Associated Studies Department was established in 1972, introducing foreign language teaching to Imperial. The Humanities Department was formed in 1980 by merging the Associated Studies and History of Science departments.

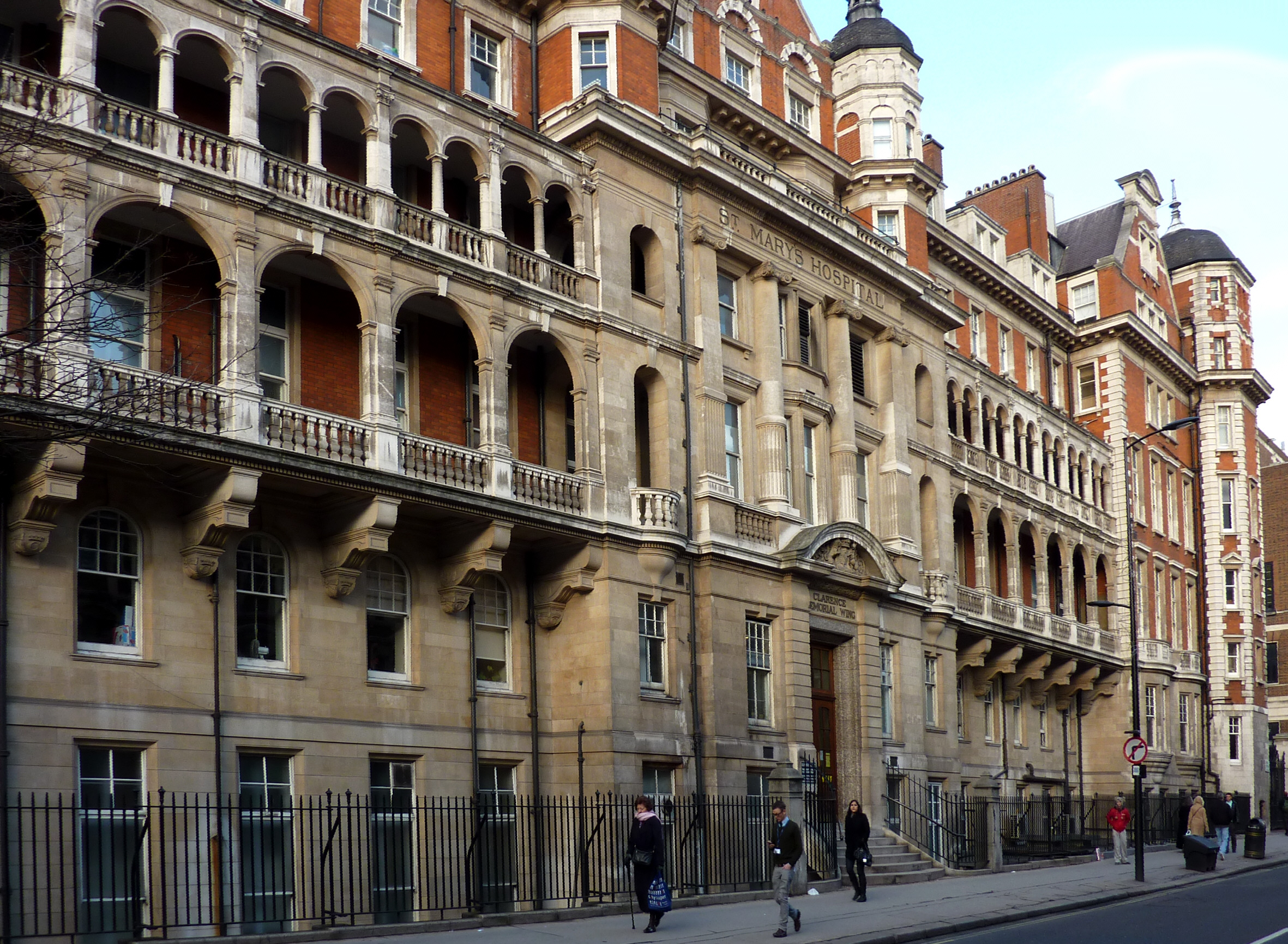
St Mary's Hospital

=== Imperial College of Science, Technology and Medicine ===
In 1988, Imperial merged with St Mary's Hospital Medical School under the Imperial College Act 1988. Amendments to the royal charter changed the formal name of the institution to The Imperial College of Science, Technology and Medicine and made St Mary's a constituent college.

In 1995, Imperial launched its own academic publishing house, Imperial College Press, in partnership with World Scientific. Imperial merged with the National Heart and Lung Institute in 1995 and the Charing Cross and Westminster Medical School, Royal Postgraduate Medical School (RPMS) and the Institute of Obstetrics and Gynaecology in 1997. In the same year the Imperial College School of Medicine was formally established and all of the property of Charing Cross and Westminster Medical School, the National Heart and Lung Institute and the Royal Postgraduate Medical School were transferred to Imperial as the result of the Imperial College Act 1997.

In 2000, Imperial merged with both the Kennedy Institute of Rheumatology and Wye College, the University of London's agricultural college in Wye, Kent, which later closed.

== 21st century ==
In 2001, the college announced that constituent colleges which had been incorporated into the college in the early 20th century would become fully integrated and lose their individual identity, with the college transitioning to a faculty system. This process was completed by 2003, forming the Faculties of Engineering, Medicine, Life Sciences, and Physical Sciences. The faculties of life and physical sciences were later merged to form the Faculty of Natural Sciences in 2005.

In October 2002, a merger was proposed between Imperial and UCL that would have formed an institution with 28,000 students and a research budget of £400 million – more than Oxford and Cambridge combined. Richard Sykes, then Rector of Imperial, said that the merger "would lead to the creation of a truly world-class research-based institution with the resources necessary to compete effectively with the best in the world." Strong opposition from academics, particularly at UCL where a "takeover by Imperial" was feared, led to the proposals being dropped a month later.

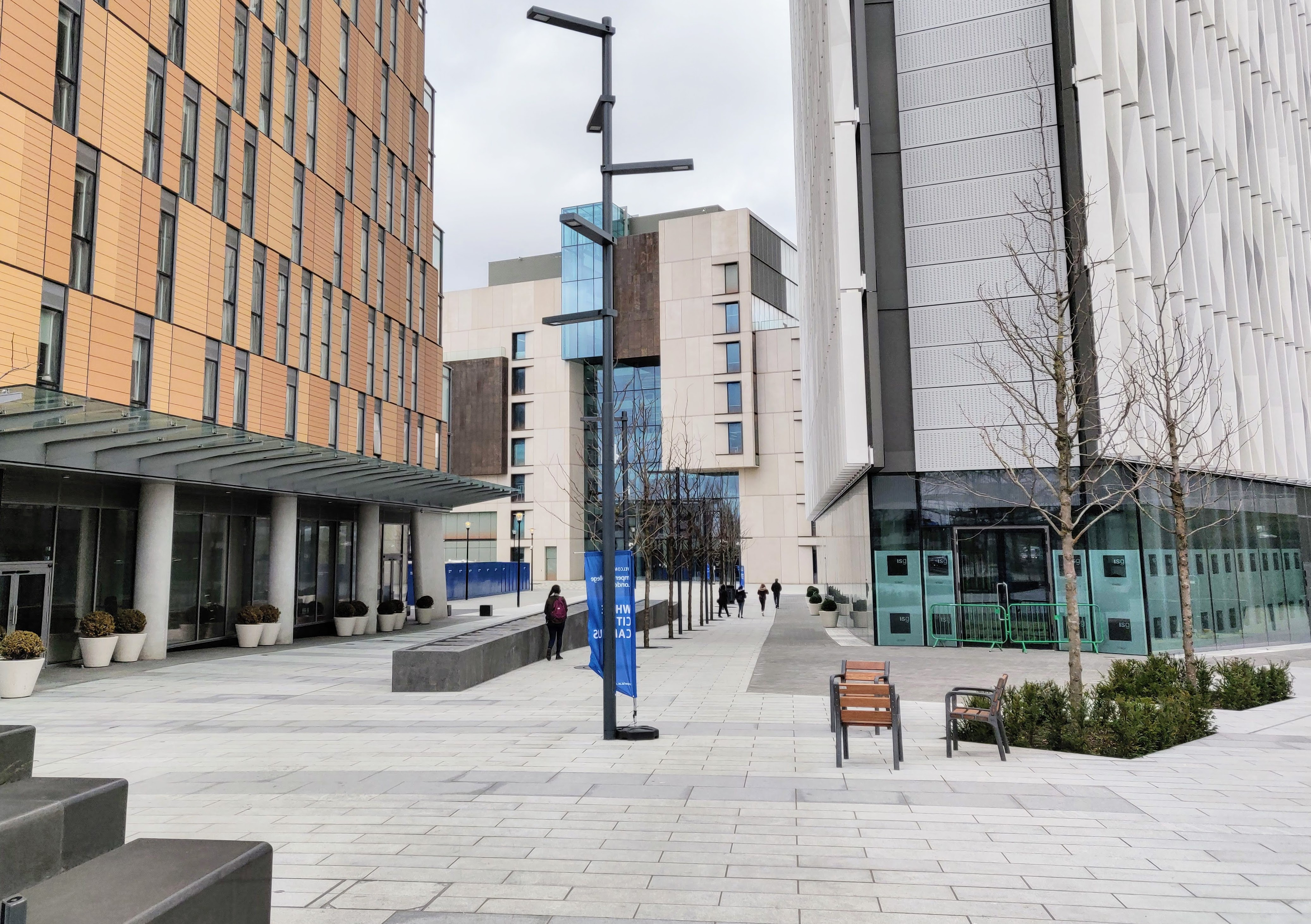
The college's research campus at White City began opening in 2016

In 2003, Imperial was granted degree-awarding powers in its own right by the Privy Council. The London Centre for Nanotechnology was established in the same year as a joint venture between UCL and Imperial College London. In 2004 the Imperial College Business School, originally known as the Tanaka Business School, and a new main entrance on Exhibition Road were opened by Queen Elizabeth II. It was renamed the Imperial College Business School in 2008. The UK Energy Research Centre was also established in 2004 and opened its headquarters at Imperial.

On 9 December 2005, Imperial announced that it would commence negotiations to secede from the University of London. Imperial became fully independent of the University of London in July 2007. In July 2008 the Centre for Advanced Structural Ceramics was opened in the Materials department.

In April 2011, Imperial and King's College London joined the UK Centre for Medical Research and Innovation (UKCMRI) as partners with a commitment of £40 million each to the project. The centre was later renamed the Francis Crick Institute and opened on 9 November 2016. It the largest single biomedical laboratory in Europe. In March 2013, the Brevan Howard Centre for Financial Analysis was constructed using a £20.1 million donation from Imperial alumnus and hedge fund founder Alan Howard. The centre researches financial economics and risk, and promotes investment and productivity across disciplines. The centre is designed as a bridge between the business school and business, policy-makers, academic experts, and the public. In 2014 the Dyson School of Design Engineering was opened following a £12m donation by the James Dyson Foundation, along with undergraduate courses in Design Engineering.

The college began moving into the new White City campus in 2016, with the launching of the Innovation Hub. This was followed by the opening of the Molecular Sciences Research Hub for the Department of Chemistry in 2018.

== See also ==
- Albertopolis
- Commonwealth Institute
- University of London
