= CASC =

CASC or Casc may refer to:

== Organisations ==
- California Association of Student Councils, US
- Cambodian Acid Survivors Charity
- Canadian Army Service Corps, redesignated as the Royal Canadian Army Service Corps
- Canadian Association of Stand-up Comedians
- Canadian Automobile Sport Clubs
- Carl Albert State College, Oklahoma, US
- Centre for Advanced Structural Ceramics, London, UK
- Certificate Authority Security Council
- China Aerospace Science and Technology Corporation
- China Aviation Supplies Holding Company
- Corps Area Service Command, a part of the corps area organization of the U.S. army from 1920 to 1942

== Other uses ==
- Community amateur sports club, a UK tax status
- CADE ATP System Competition, of theorem provers for classical logic
- Cardington Artificial Slalom Course, an artificial whitewater canoe slalom course in the UK

== See also ==
- KASC (disambiguation)
- Casque (disambiguation)
- Cask (disambiguation)
- Kask (disambiguation)
