= ARSM =

ARSM can refer to:

- Associate of the Royal School of Mines, a post-nominal still awarded to graduates of formerly Royal School of Mines associated departments at Imperial College London
- Associate of the Royal Schools of Music, a performance qualification of the Associated Board of the Royal Schools of Music in the United Kingdom
