= Edward F. Law =

British metallurgist (1877–1954)

Edward Fulton Law, ARSM (1877–1954), was a British metallurgist and writer on metallurgy.

== Life ==
Law studied at the Royal College of Science and the Royal College of Mines. After working at the Royal Mint, in 1903 he established himself in private practice as a consultant metallurgist. In 1922 he became a partner in Riley, Harbord and Law. During the Second World War he worked for the Admiralty. He served on the Council of the Iron and Steel Institute, which he had joined in 1908, and in 1950 was elected honorary vice-president. He died at Woodbridge, Surrey, on 22 May 1954.

== Publications ==
Law was the author of Alloys and their Industrial Applications (London, 1909), which went into at least four editions.

He was a contributor to the journal of the Iron and Steel Institute, and to the 14th edition of the Encyclopædia Britannica (1929–1930).
