= Dyson School =

Dyson School or The Dyson School can refer to:

== United Kingdom ==
- Dyson Institute of Engineering and Technology, a private undergraduate institute in Malmesbury, Wiltshire
- Dyson School of Design Engineering, an engineering department at Imperial College London

== United States ==
- Charles H. Dyson School of Applied Economics and Management, a school of Cornell University
