= University of London Air Squadron =

University flying squadron of the Royal Air Force

- Active: 1935–1939; 1941–present
- Role: Training
- Part of: No. 6 Flying Training School RAF
- Garrison/HQ: RAF Wittering
- Motto: 'Learn by Degrees'
- Equipment: Grob Tutor T1

The University of London Air Squadron, often abbreviated to ULAS, forms part of the Royal Air Force Volunteer Reserve and provides a wide range of training for students of the University of London and affiliated universities.

== Present day ==
University Air Squadrons offer basic flying instruction, leadership and adventurous training to undergraduates and graduates and encourage members to take up a career as an officer in one of the branches of the Royal Air Force, although there is no obligation to join the Royal Air Force upon graduation.

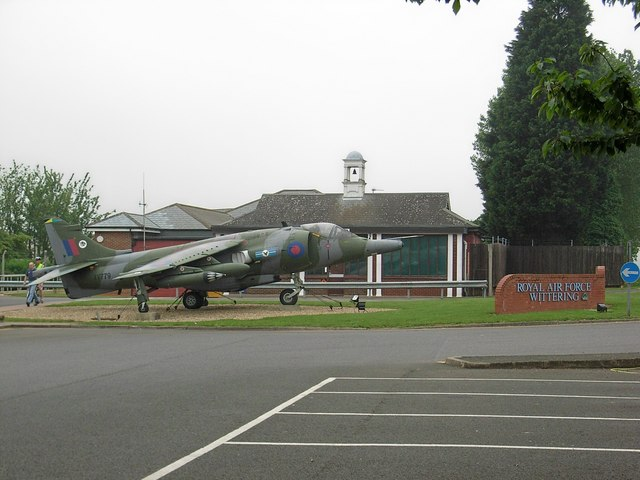
RAF Wittering

Most members of ULAS hold the title of officer cadet, which carries the privileges of a commissioned officer, but the rank of an airman. Senior members such as the senior student and flight commanders are granted commissions in the RAF Volunteer Reserve, with the rank of acting pilot officer. The commanding officer is a squadron leader beneath whom serve a chief flying instructor (CFI), chief ground instructor (CGI), ground training instructor (GTI) as well as other flying instructors, a civilian adjutant and civilian administrative staff.

ULAS recruits during the Autumn Term of each Academic Year. Normally ULAS looks to recruit between 35 and 45 members, and accepts some 400 applications and approximately 80 applicants for the final stage of interviews.

Officer Cadets are required to attend a minimum of one training night a week during full term, which is usually a lecture by a guest speaker on an aspect of the Royal Air Force or another military unit. In addition, cadets are expected to attend camps during the Easter and Summer holidays. These include flying, leadership and field craft camps, adventurous training, and sporting events. The University of London Air Squadron also partakes in a number of ceremonial events in and around the City of London, such as the University of London's Foundation Day, Remembrance Sunday and in 2012 the unveiling of the RAF Bomber Command Memorial at Hyde Park Corner.

In addition to the standard military training and sporting fixtures carried out on a year-round basis, the squadron hosts a number of social events throughout the year in the form of the winter and spring balls and the dining in night for squadron personnel, the annual dinner for honoured guests and the wine and cheese evening for the parents and tutors of squadron personnel.

Currently, ULAS is based at RAF Wittering and operates the Grob Tutor T Mk 1s from Monday to Friday during term time.

== History ==
=== 1935 to 1945 ===
The University of London Air Squadron was formed in September 1935 and took up headquarters in Exhibition Road in South Kensington in March 1936, with its flying headquarters at RAF Northolt. At its inception, the squadron was equipped with Avro 504Ns but was rapidly re-equipped with Avro Tutors and later Hawker Harts for advanced training. The squadron held its first summer camp at RAF Halton in 1936 and returned in 1937 when the squadron was only allowed to enroll fifty members, and a further two, Duxford in 1938 from which time it was allowed to enroll 75 members and Thorney Island in 1939. With the outbreak of war in 1939 the squadron was disbanded, but was reformed in April 1941 to provide pilot training to students of the University of London whom had volunteered for aircrew duties. The first course started in October 1941 and the squadron became, in effect, a Wing for the duration of the war with three squadrons: Number 1 Squadron was based at Kensington, Number 2 at Holloway and Number 3 at Twickenham. During the war, out of 150 prewar members, 42 members of the squadron were killed in action, 4 received the DSO, 2 an MBE and 19 received the DFC, one with bar. (These figures do not include members of the squadron who passed through between 1941 and 1945.)

=== 1945 to present ===
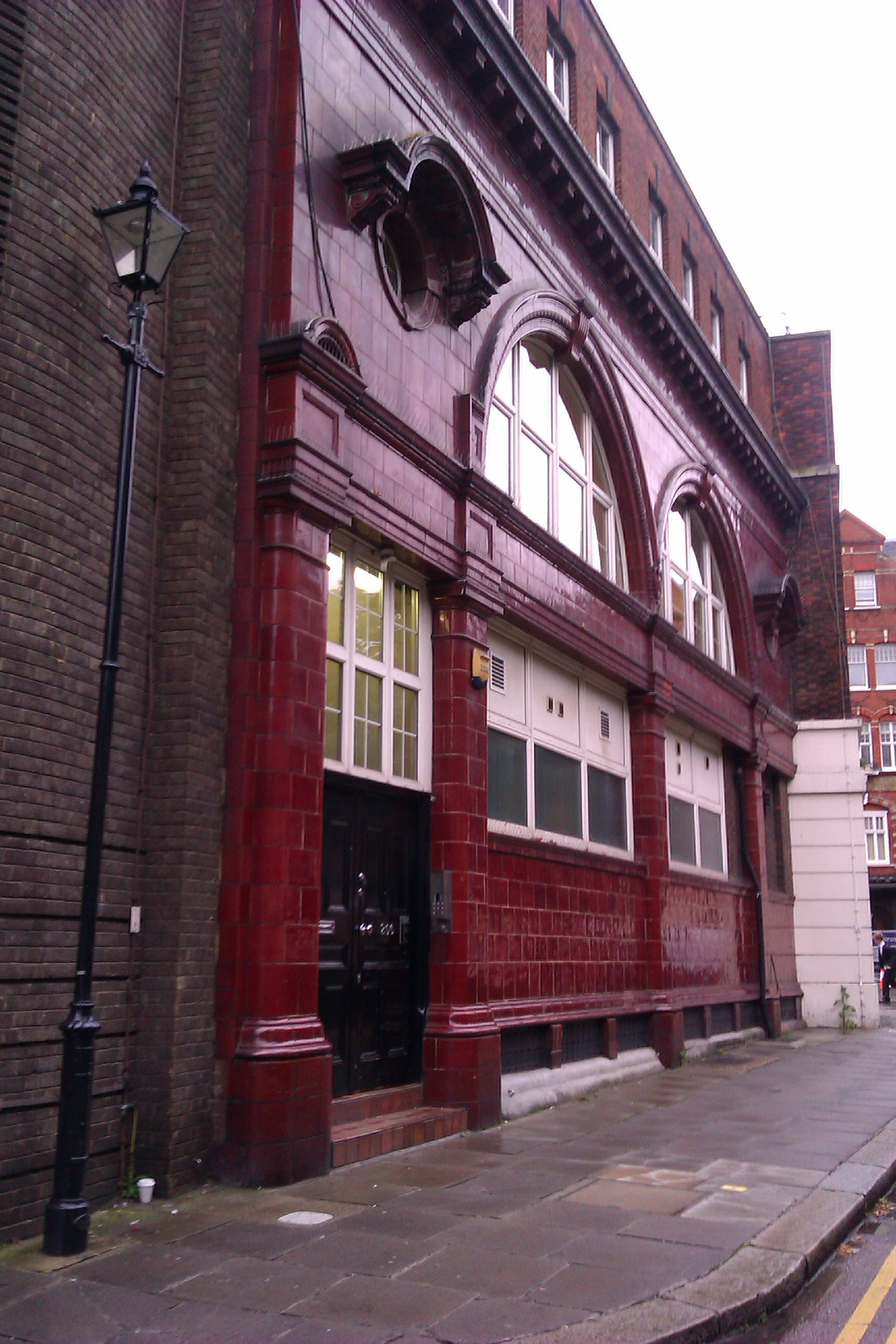
Brompton Road Station Front

After the war in 1946 the University Air Squadrons reverted to their pre-war organization with ULAS reforming at RAF Biggin Hill with de Havilland Tiger Moths. In 1947 the squadron moved to Fairoaks and relocated its town headquarters to 48 Prince's Gardens. After its move to RAF Booker in 1950 ULAS was the sixth unit to equip with de Havilland Chipmunks and maintained the air frames through its moves to RAF Kenley in 1954, RAF Biggin Hill in 1957 and the grass airfield at RAF White Waltham in 1959 until 1973 when, after relocating RAF Abingdon, it was the first unit in the RAF to reequip with the Scottish Aviation Bulldog. In this year the squadron had over 200 members, just over half of whom were receiving flying training. The unit relocated to RAF Benson on 30 June 1992 and in 1999 to at RAF Wyton in Cambridgeshire. 1999 also marked the introduction of the Grob Tutor T1 into RAF service with ULAS again being the first to take delivery of a new type.

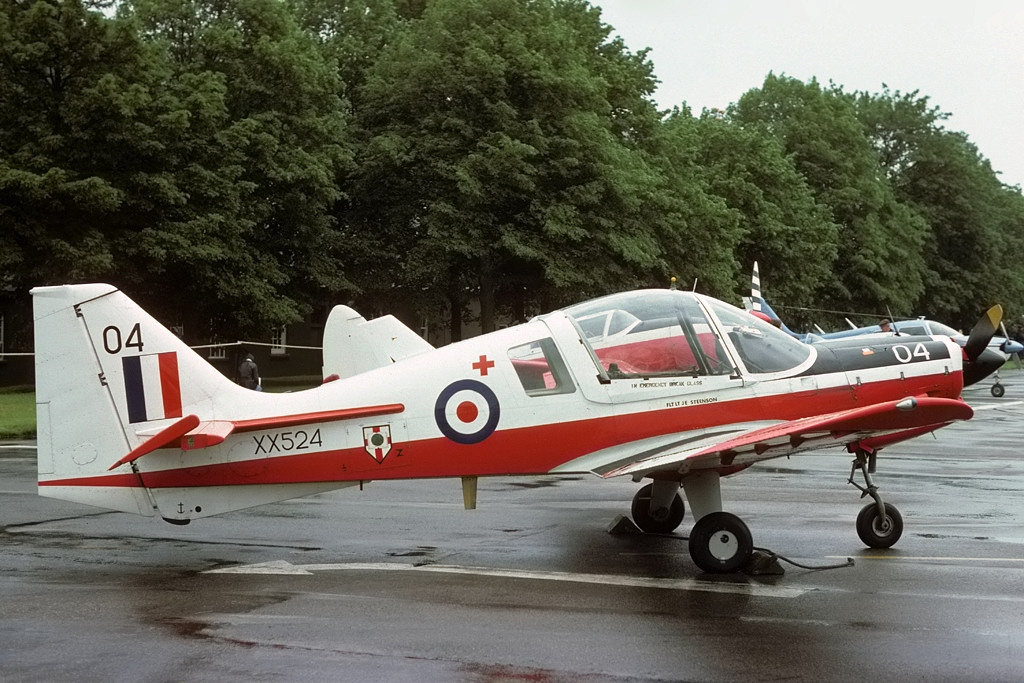
Scottish Aviation Bulldog T1 of ULAS at RAF Abingdon

The unit was issued its crest on 5 May 1951 by its first Commanding Officer, Air Vice Marshal FH Maynard who commanded the squadron in 1935. 1951 also saw the University of London Air Squadron make a name for itself in the national press when some of its members ascended the 295 feet high Skylon, the landmark structure of the Festival of Britain, and attached a ULAS flag to the top. In 1966 the squadron moved its headquarters to 206 Brompton Road, the old Brompton Road underground station. In 1974 Queen Elizabeth The Queen Mother agreed to become the Squadron's Honorary Air Commodore, a position She held until 1993 when the Princess Royal assumed the role. On the eleventh of December 2013, ULAS was awarded the Rex Waite memorial trophy, for outstanding acts of charity carried out over the year in support of the Jon Egging trust including raising £15,000. ULAS was the first UAS to be awarded the trophy. In April 2015, the squadron completed its long planned move to RAF Wittering with Cambridge University Air Squadron and 5 Air Experience Flight bringing to an end all military flying from RAF Wyton. Also in 2015, squadron members raised £54,000 for charity, a number unprecedented in University Air Squadron history. In August of that same year, the squadron moved from its town headquarters on Brompton Road to RAF Northolt, where resided in temporary accommodation until its new town headquarters on the base was finished in late 2016.

In 2022, it was announced that ULAS would be returning to Central London and would share a Town Headquarters with the university Officer Training Corps at Russell Square.

== Notable members ==
Robert Hanbury Brown
A British astronomer and physicist who made notable contributions to the development of radar. Member of ULAS from 1935 to 1936.
Douglas Macfadyen
An RAF officer who became Air Officer Commanding-in-Chief at RAF Home Command from 1956 to 1959. Adjutant to the squadron 1935–37.
Geoffrey T. R. Hill
A British aviator and aeronautical engineer. Member of ULAS from 1935 to 1939.
Gordon Hughes
A Second World War reconnaissance pilot. Member of ULAS from 1936 to 1939.
Patrick Wells
A Second World War RAF pilot who flew during the Battle of Britain. Member of ULAS from 1936 to 1939.
Ronald Pitts Crick
A pioneer of British eye surgery. Member of ULAS from 1937 to 1939.
John Grandy
Adjutant to the squadron 1937–1939 and Chief of the Air Staff 1967–1971.
Peter Harding (metallurgist)
A Second World War RAF reconnaissance pilot, PoW and participant in The Great Escape from Stalag Luft III. Member of ULAS from 1937 to 1939.
Geoffrey Page
A fighter pilot who was shot down during the Battle of Britain, badly burned, and a founding member of the Guinea Pig Club. Member of ULAS from 1937 to 1939.
John Nunn (RAF officer)
An RAF officer, mathematician, and politician. He served as an RAF pilot during the Second World War, and was involved in The Great Escape. Member of ULAS from 1938 to 1939.
Brian Powell
A test pilot in the first two decades after the Second World War. Member of ULAS from 1938 to 1939.
Colin Chapman
The founder of Lotus Cars. Member of ULAS from 1945 to 1948.
Malcolm Muir
A test pilot for both Rolls-Royce and for deHavilland. Member of ULAS 1950–53.
Tudor Owen (judge)
Notable judge and Master of the Guild of Air Pilots and Air Navigators. Member of ULAS in 1970.
Kirsty Stewart
The first female pilot of the RAF Red Arrows aerobatic team
Flt Lt James Turner
joined the RAF in 2006, Red Arrows from 2020

== See also ==
- University Air Squadron units
- University Royal Naval Unit, the Royal Navy equivalent
- Officers Training Corps, the British Army equivalent
- List of Royal Air Force aircraft squadrons
