= Regius Professor of Engineering =

Regius Professor of Engineering refers to a number of chairs of engineering in the United Kingdom granted the status of Regius Professor by the monarch:

- Regius Professor of Engineering at the University of Cambridge
- Regius Professor of Engineering at the University of Edinburgh
- Regius Professor of Engineering at Imperial College London
