= Casque =

Casque is a French word for helmet. It can refer to:

- Casque (anatomy), an enlargement on the beaks of some species of birds, including many hornbills
- Hornbill ivory, the casque of the helmeted hornbill, collected as a decorative material
- S. C. H. "Sammy" Davis (1887–1981), a motor-racing journalist who used the pen name Casque
- Casque-class destroyer, French Navy ships built between 1910 and 1912

== See also ==
- Casque and Gauntlet, a senior society at Dartmouth College
- Cask (disambiguation)
- Kask (disambiguation)
- CASC (disambiguation)
- KASC (disambiguation)
