= Coat of arms of Imperial College London =

- Armiger: Imperial College London
- Adopted: 1908
- Shield: Per fesse in chief the Royal Arms of the United Kingdom of Great Britain and Ireland, in base or, an open book proper inscribed with the word "Scientia"
- Motto: Scientia imperii decus et tutamen (no longer depicted)
- Use: Formal or ceremonial contexts, degrees and official documents, competitions

The coat of arms of Imperial College London is an heraldic emblem used by Imperial College London. Edward VII granted the college the arms on the 6 June 1908 by royal warrant. It is blazoned:

Per fesse in chief the Royal Arms of the United Kingdom of Great Britain and Ireland, in base or, an open book proper inscribed with the word "Scientia"

— Arthur Charles Fox-Davies, The Book of Public Arms

The open book with Scientia inscribed was later adopted by the then-new New South Wales University of Technology in 1952. The historic constituent colleges, and their surviving constituent unions use their own emblems, with only the City and Guilds's emblem being a coat of arms. Many of the historic medical schools which merged to form Imperial College School of Medicine also had their own coat of arms, although these are no longer used. On 5 June 2020, the college decided to remove the motto from the official rendition of the coat of arms, to address issues of colonialism. This was part of a wider effort to address racial inequality in college provisions following the murder of George Floyd and the ensuing focus on the Black Lives Matter movement. The motto, "Scientia imperii decus et tutamen", which is translated as "Scientific knowledge, the crowning glory and the safeguard of the empire", had always traditionally been shown with the crest, being depicted as such by Fox-Davies as early as 1915. Unusually for an English university motto, it was granted with the coat of arms, which prevented it from being updated instead of simply not being shown.

== Gallery ==
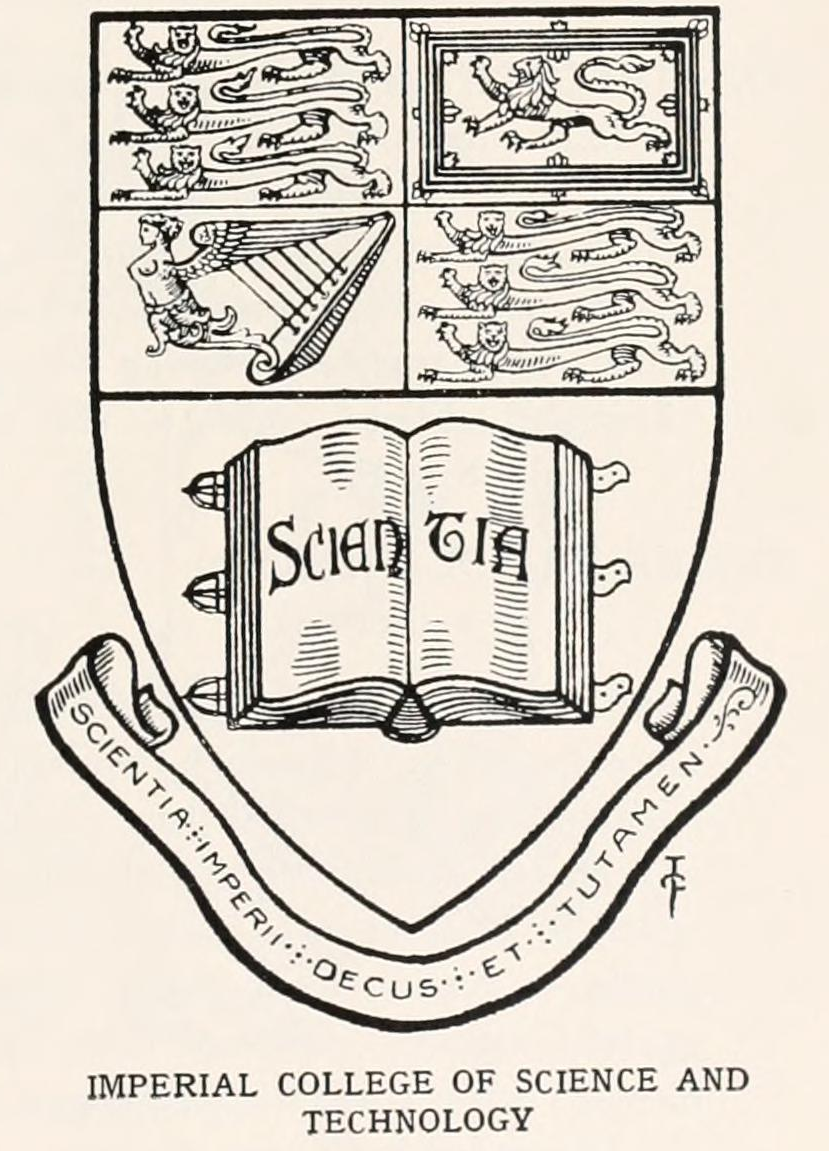
As depicted in The Book of Public Arms

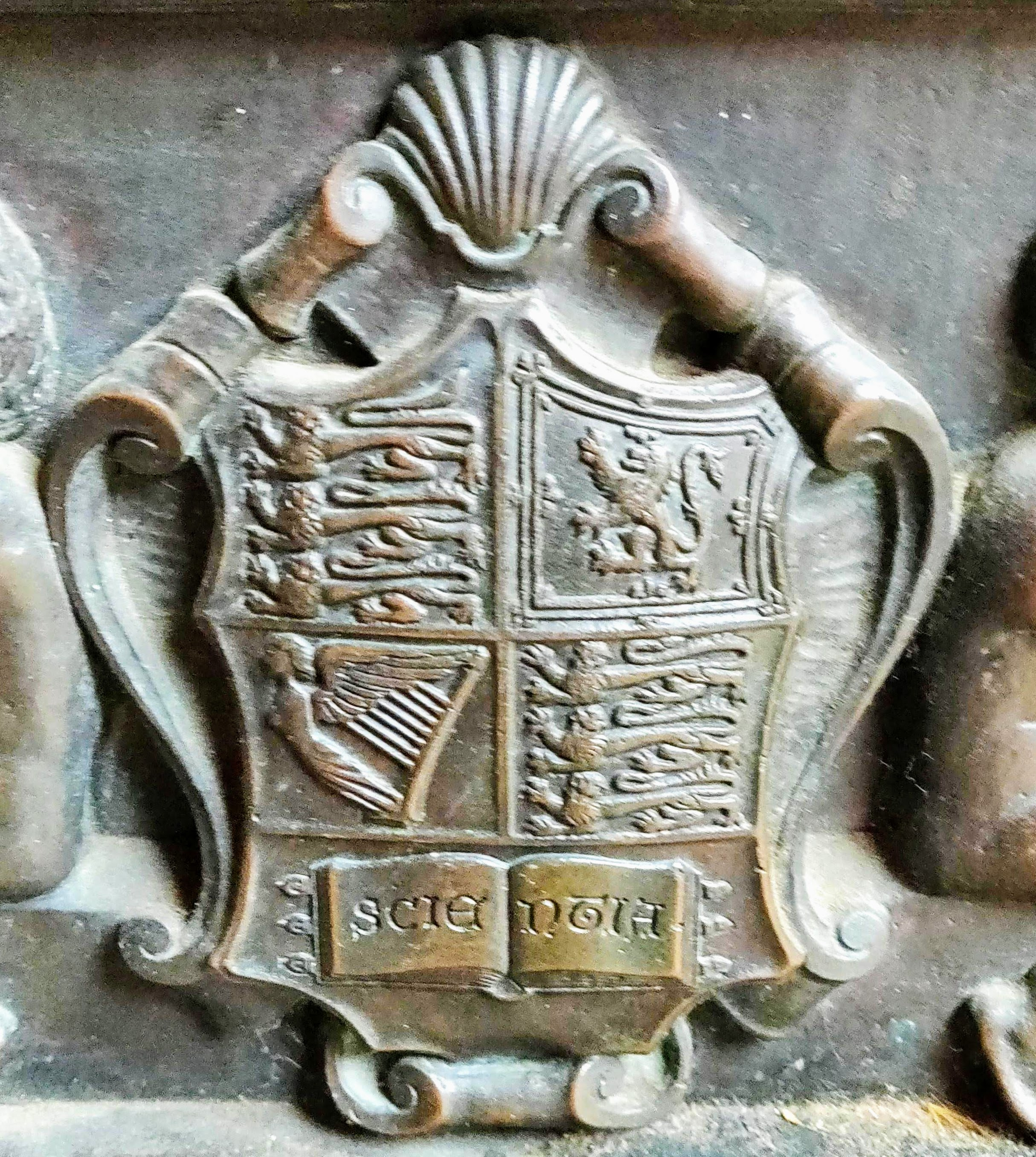
On a plaque to Alfred Beit under Beit Arch

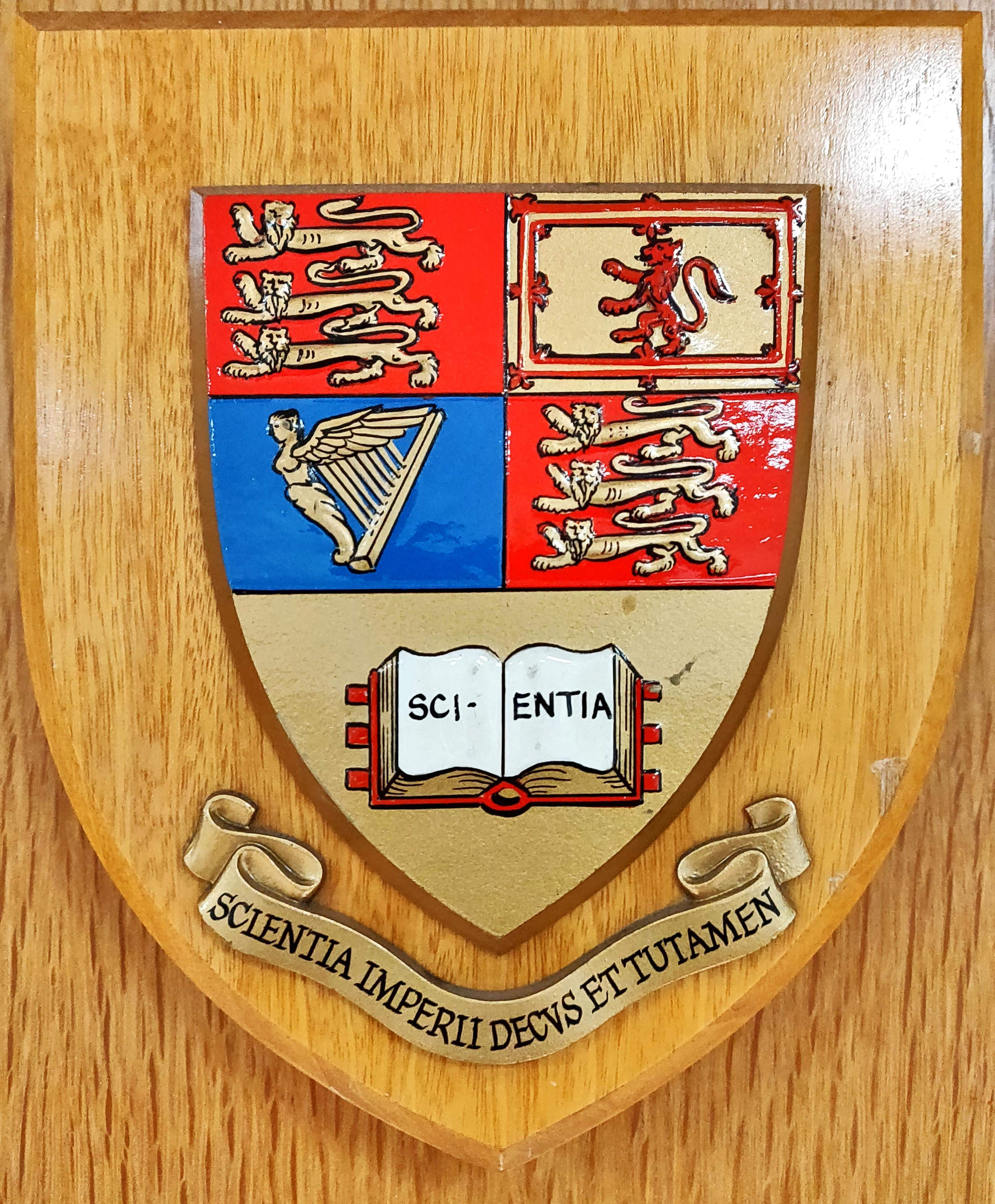
Wooden rendition in the Huxley Building

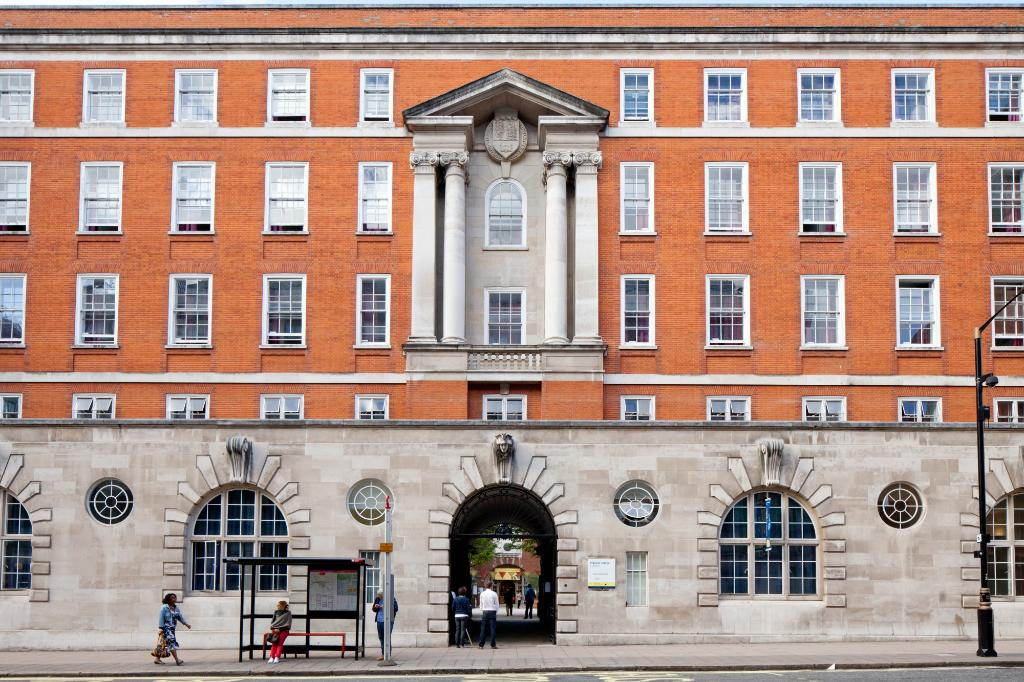
Visible on the façade of Beit Hall

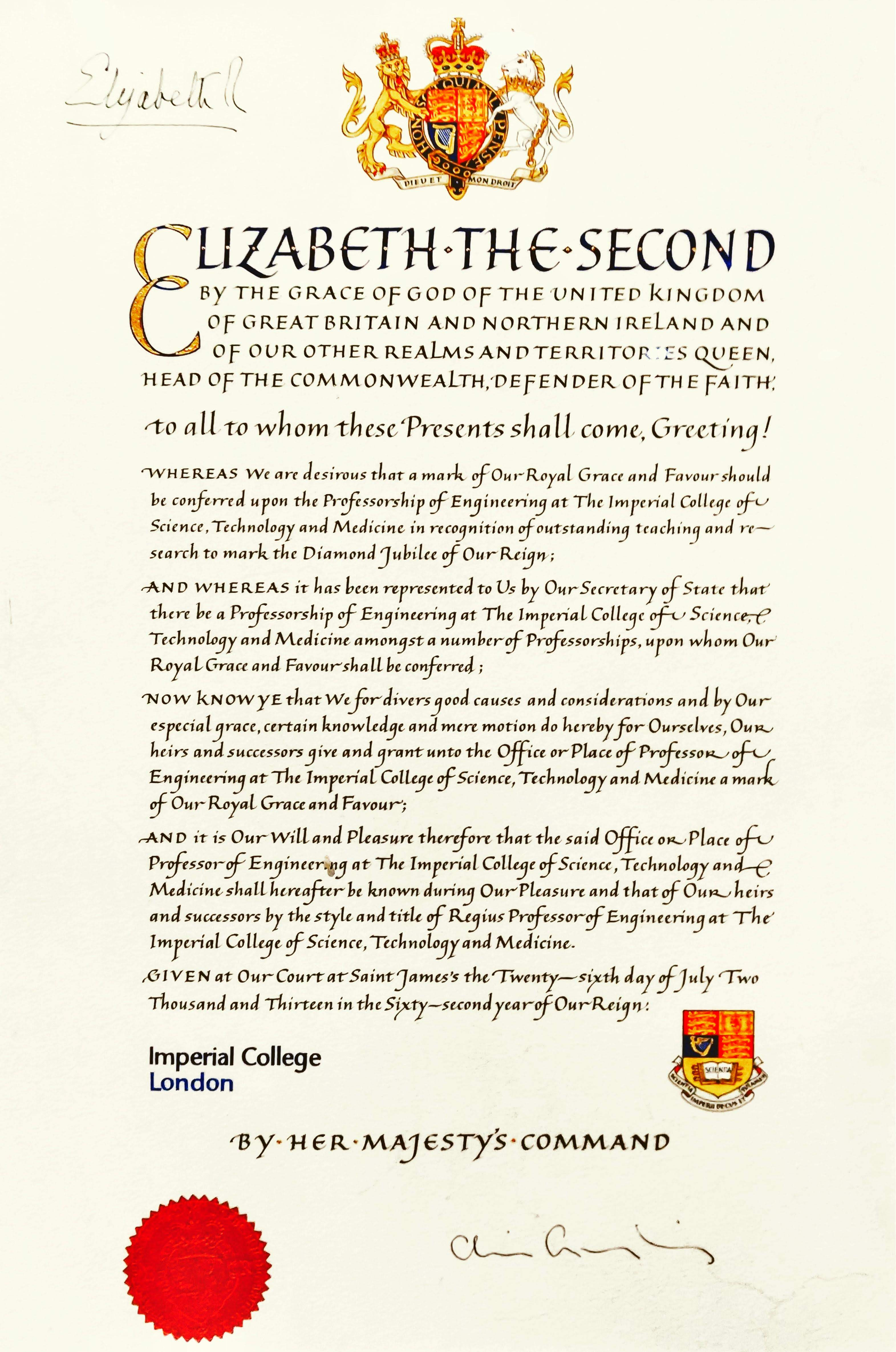
Royal warrant for the Regius Professor of Engineering

Traditional rendition with the college motto

== See also ==
- Armorial of UK universities
- Coat of arms of the United Kingdom
- English Heraldry § Educational Institutions
- History of Imperial College London
