= Faculty of Engineering, Imperial College London =

Academic faculty in London, England

- Former names: City and Guilds College; Royal School of Mines
- Established: 2001
- Dean: Professor Nigel Brandon
- Location: London, United Kingdom
- Campus: South Kensington
Colours
City & Guilds College
Royal School of Mines
- Website: www.imperial.ac.uk/engineering/

The Faculty of Engineering is one of four faculties of Imperial College London, in London, England. Imperial's Faculty of Engineering was formed in 2001, from two of the universities constituent colleges - the Royal School of Mines (established in 1851) and City and Guilds College (established in 1881). The faculty is ranked as the top engineering institute in the UK in the 2021 Research Excellence Framework.

The faculty is located at Imperial's main South Kensington campus, where teaching and research take place.

The faculty offers undergraduate Bachelor's and Master's of Engineering courses, as well as postgraduate courses leading to MSc, MRes and doctoral degrees. Undergraduates studying at faculty departments obtain the appropriate associateship according to their course, either the Associateship of the City & Guilds of London Institute (ACGI) or the Associateship of the Royal School of Mines (ARSM) depending on the historic association of their department.

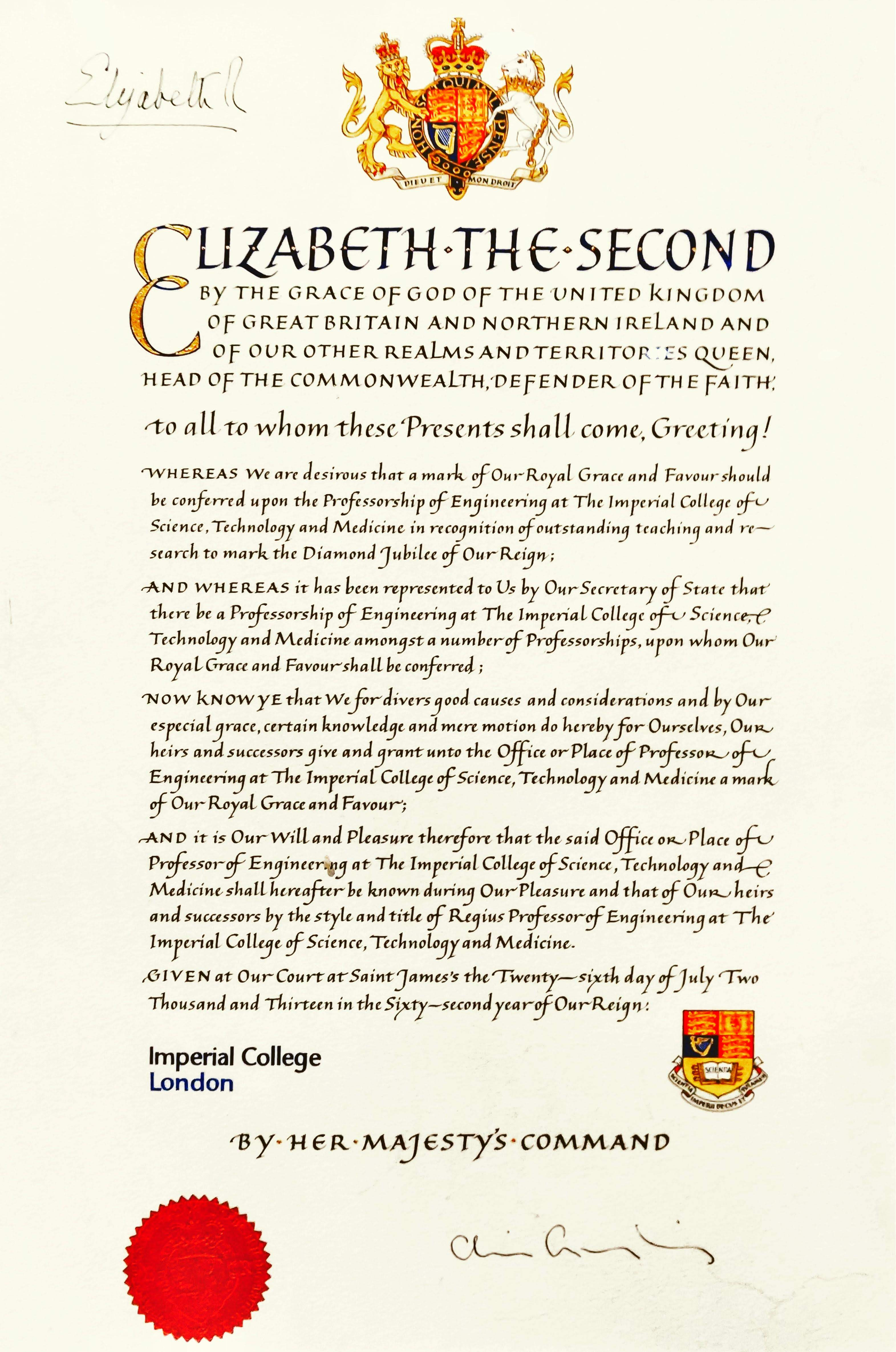
The Regius Professor of Engineering granted by letters patent

== History ==
=== Royal School of Mines ===
Royal School of Mines was established in 1851, as the Government School of Mines and Science Applied to the Arts. The School developed from the Museum of Economic Geology, which had provided some student places for the study of mineralogy and metallurgy. The Museum of Practical Geology and the Government School of Mines and Science Applied to the Arts opened in a purpose-designed building in Jermyn Street in 1851. The officers of the Geological Survey became the lecturers and professors of the School of Mines. The Royal College of Chemistry was merged into it in 1853, and the name changed in 1863 to the Royal School of Mines. The school moved to South Kensington in 1872, and in 1907 was incorporated into Imperial College of Science and Technology, retaining its own identity as a constituent college. The school moved to a new building designed by Sir Aston Webb, which was completed in 1913.

=== City and Guilds College ===
The main precursor to the faculty was the Central Technical College, which was founded by the City and Guilds of London Institute, opening in 1884. The institute was founded after a meeting at Mansion House by the city livery companies in July, 1876. The Prince of Wales laid the foundation stone for the college in 1881, and returned to open the new building. The college was located in South Kensington on land bought by the 1851 Exhibition Commissioners, in an area set out by Prince Albert for the purpose of science and knowledge, known now as Albertopolis. The building was built by Alfred Waterhouse. The college was set to focus on engineering, manufacturing, architecture, applied art, and chemical technology, with applicants required to sit entrance exams. The college was granted permission to award the Associateship of the City and Guilds Institute, which the faculty still awards, although it was unable to award university degrees. Amongst the first appointed professors in 1884 were William Unwin to engineering and Henry Armstrong to chemical technology. The name changed to Central Technical College in 1893, by which time the number of chemistry and engineering students exceeded 200, requiring other subjects to be displaced. In 1900, the college became of school of the Faculty of Engineering at the University of London.

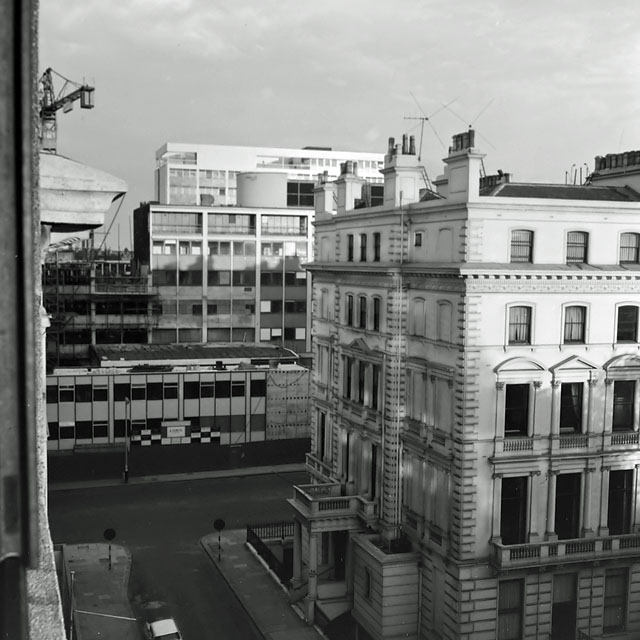
The new City and Guilds College Building, 1964

In 1907, the same year as Imperial College was founded, the college was renamed The City & Guilds College, and was incorporated into Imperial in 1910 as a constituent college. Although the City & Guilds College was governed by Imperial College following its incorporation as a constituent college, the City and Guilds Institute maintained seats on the Court of Imperial College. The merge resulted in the closing of the City & Guild's chemistry department in 1913 and the merging of the mathematics department into the other constituent colleges, and the splitting of the Department of Civil and Mechanical Engineering into separate departments. The Goldsmiths Extension was constructed immediately to the north, between the college and the Royal School of Mines and workshops were added behind the original building, allowing the college to double in size. The Goldsmiths Extension was completed in 1914, although they were not opened until 21 October 1926 by the Duke of York, due World War I. The college had come to be known as "the Central" by 1935, with students known as "Central men". The original building was demolished in 1962 to make way for newer facilities for the college. The college celebrated in centenary in 1985, by which time it had grown to 2200 students.

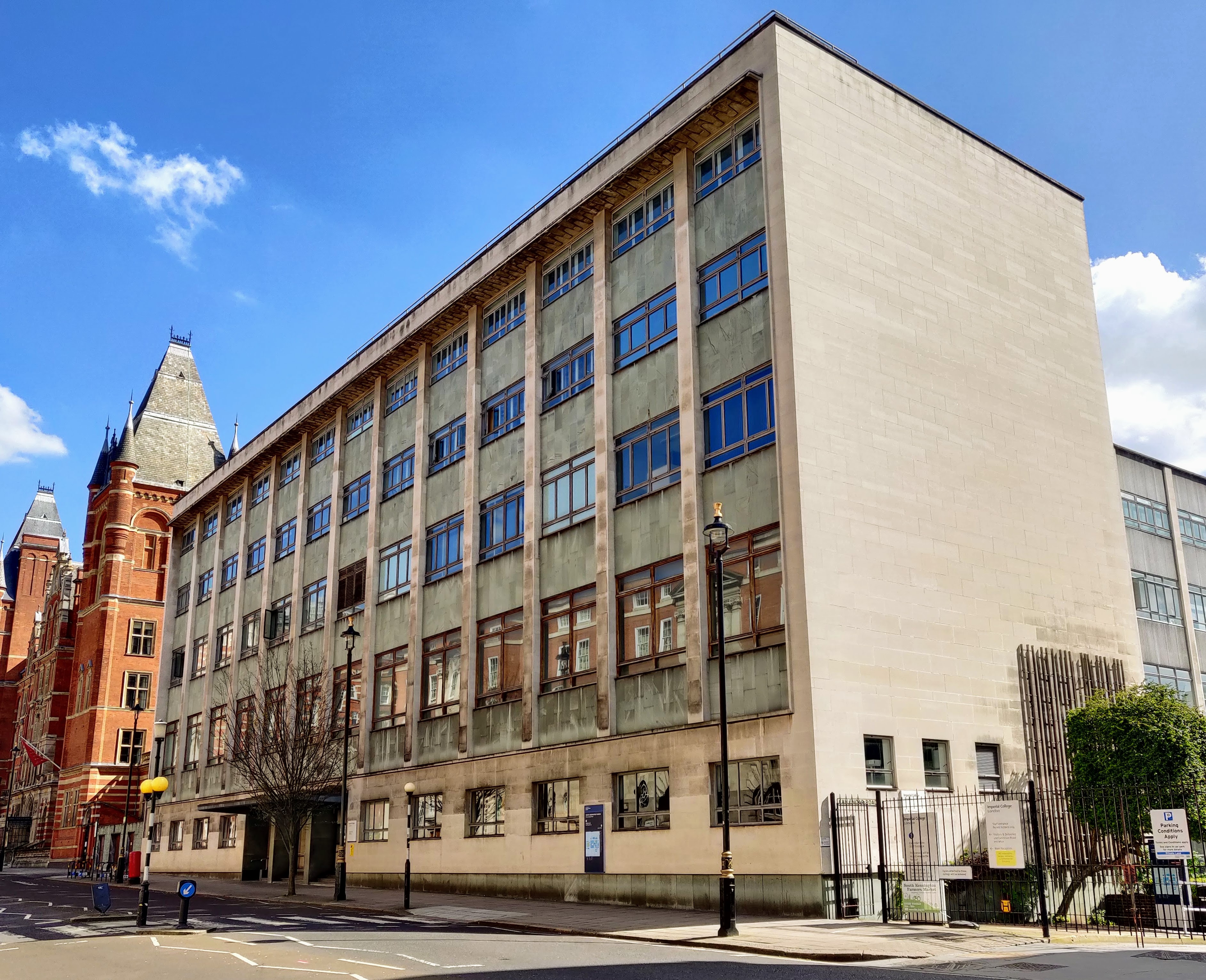
Department of Aeronautics, Roderic Hill Building, Prince Consort Road

=== Faculty ===
In 2001, Imperial College restructured, creating a new faculty system, and the Faculty of Engineering was created. The City & Guilds College, along with the other constituent colleges, ceased to exist as a separate entity. In September 2013 the Mechanical and Aeronautical engineering building at Imperial College was renamed City and Guilds Building to acknowledge the historical legacy. The name of the constituent college also survives in the City & Guilds College Union (CGCU) — the student union for the Imperial College Faculty of Engineering and the Imperial College Business School. In January 2013, the Queen endowed a Regius Professor of Engineering at the college. The first chair was Chris Toumazou, professor in the Department of Electrical and Electronic Engineering. In September of the same year, the Mechanical Engineering Building was renamed the City and Guilds Building (CAGB) to honour the links between Imperial College and the City and Guilds College. After an extensive refurbishment, the City and Guilds Building now houses the Mechanical Engineering and Aeronautics departments. In 2014 the Dyson School of Design Engineering was founded following a £12m donation by the James Dyson Foundation to the college, being the first new engineering division at Imperial for two decades. The school took over the old Met Office building from the Science Museum on the corner of Imperial College Road and Exhibition Road.

Alumni of the Imperial College Faculty of Engineering are organised as the City & Guilds College Association. Established in 1897 as the Old Centralians, the Association adopted its current name in 1992.

== Departments ==
- Department of Aeronautics
- Department of Bioengineering
- Dyson School of Design Engineering
- Department of Chemical Engineering
- Department of Civil & Environmental Engineering
- Department of Computing
- Department of Earth Science & Engineering
- Department of Electrical & Electronic Engineering
- Department of Materials
- Department of Mechanical Engineering

== Student life ==
Undergraduates of the faculty are represented by two constituent unions, depending on the historical association of their department to one of the former constituent colleges of Imperial. Students in Aeronautics, Bioengineering, Computing, and Chemical, Civil and Environmental, Design, Electrical and Electronic, and Mechanical Engineering are part of the City and Guilds College Union, whilst students in Earth Science and Engineering, and Materials are part of the Royal School of Mines Union.

== Research Evaluation ==
The faculty ranked as the top engineering school in the UK in 2021 Research Excellence Framework (REF). In 2014, the faculty had been ranked third.

REF Score
| Assessment Year | GPA | National Ranking |
|---|---|---|
| 2021 | 3.74 | 1 |
| 2014 | 3.38 | 3 |
