= KASC =

KASC may refer to:

- KASC-LP, a defunct low-power television station (channel 7) formerly licensed to serve Atascadero, California, United States
- KASC (AM), a radio station (1330 AM) at Arizona State University
- King Abdullah Sports City

== See also ==
- Kask (disambiguation)
- CASC (disambiguation)
- Cask (disambiguation)
- Casque (disambiguation)
