= John Anthony Sydney Ritson =

British Lions & England international rugby union player

- Born: 18 August 1887 Chester-le-Street, England
- Died: 16 October 1957 (aged 70) Guildford, England
- School: Uppingham School
- University: Durham University

Rugby union career
- Position: forward
Amateur team(s)
Years	Team	Apps	(Points)
- Northern
1911	Barbarian F.C.	2	(0)
–	Northumberland		
International career
Years	Team	Apps	(Points)
1908	British Isles	1	(0)
1910–1913	England	8	(6)

John Anthony Sydney Ritson DSO & Bar, OBE, MC (18 August 1887 – 16 October 1957) was an English mines inspector and engineer who became professor of mining at Leeds University and at the Royal School of Mines, Imperial College, London. In his early life he was a rugby union player of note playing international rugby for both England and the British and Irish Lions, and was a member of the first ever English Grand Slam winning side. During the First World War he served in the Durham Light Infantry and later commanded a battalion of the Royal Scots.

== Personal history ==
Ritson was born in 1887 in Chester-le-Street, Durham to W. M. P. Ritson, of Gullane, East Lothian. He was educated at Uppingham School, later matriculating to Durham University, where he attended Armstrong College. At Durham he graduated with distinction in mining and surveying. Ritson joined the British Army as a young man and in 1906 he was made second lieutenant in the Durham Light Infantry. In 1912 he gained a First Class Certificate of Competency as Manager of a Mine and the following year took on the post of junior mines inspector, and factories and workshops inspector, in Scotland.

Ritson's career as an inspector of mines was placed on hold when he was called for active service with the outbreak of the First World War, where as a former soldier he was recalled to the Durham Light Infantry serving in the Territorial Army. At the end of the war Ritson returned to Scotland where he continued his work as a mining inspector. In 1921 he was given his first post as a senior inspector working in Penarth in the South Wales Division. In 1923 Ritson had returned to the North of England to take up the position of Professor of Mining at Leeds University. In 1935 he was appointed an Officer of the Order of the British Empire and the following year, after 12 years at Leeds, he accepted the role of Professor of Mines at the Royal School of Mines, a department of Imperial College, London. Ritson took over the post at Imperial College from Professor S. J. Truscott, who had desired that the department focus more on coal and iron mining. Ritson's background in coal was seen as taking the Royal School of Mines in the correct direction but his lack of practical understanding of hard rock metalliferous mining resulted in him spending time in copper and gold mines in South Africa before being allowed to take up the post.

Ritson remained at Royal School of Mines until 1952 when he was succeeded by J.C. Mitcheson, and in 1955 he was made a fellow of Imperial College in recognition of his work. He was dogged by ill health in his later life, due to an injury sustained during his service during the First World War. Ritson died in 1957 at the age of 70.

== Rugby career ==
Ritson was a keen rugby union player as a youth and as an adult he played club rugby as a forward for Northern Football Club. In 1908 Ritson was approached to join and Anglo-Welsh team, a fore-runner of the British and Irish Lions, to tour Australia and New Zealand. A seven-month tour, run on a strictly amateur basis, would suggest that Ritson was independently wealthy to accept a place on the team. He played in the first three matches of the tour, scoring a try in the first game, a win over Wairarapa. On 6 June he was selected for the first Test match against New Zealand national team. The British team lost heavily, and although Riston played in a further five games of the tour he was not selected to play in the final two Test matches.

In 1910, two years after returning from his time representing the British team, he was selected for the England team, to play France in the Five Nations Championship. One of eight new caps, Ritson experienced his first international win as England overcame a strong French performance to take the match 11–3. He was reselected for the next and final game of the championship, when England faced Scotland at Edinburgh. In the match he scored his first international points with one of four English tries, set up for him by "Cherry" Pillman. The win gave England their first Championship title since 1892.

In 1911 Ritson accepted an invitation to play for touring rugby team Barbarian F.C. He played two matches of their Easter tour, facing Penarth RFC and Swansea RFC. He also played at county level, representing Northumberland.

Ritson was recalled to the England squad for the 1912 Five Nations Championship, but played in only one game, the away fixture to France which England won 18–8. England played in five international matches in 1913 and Ritson represented his country in all. The first game was against South Africa in their 1912–13 tour of Great Britain. Although England started the match stronger, the South African pack dominated in the second half to win the match. Two weeks later England began the 1913 Five Nations Championship with a game against Wales. A fairly inept Welsh performance saw England win 12–0 to begin the tournament with a victory. Ritson faced France for a third time in his career, when the French came to Twickenham. As in his previous two encounters Ritson finished on the winning side as a strong English first half turned into a rout as the French team disintegrated to lose 20–0. Two weeks later England travelled to Lansdowne Road to face Ireland, their fourth game in just six weeks. England wore down the Irish in the first half to open up a nine-point lead, with Ritson scoring his second international try to open the scoring. The game finished 15–4 to England which opened up the prospect of the country's first possible Grand Slam if they could secure a win over Scotland. Ritson started the game against Scotland, his final international match, in a fairly unchanged England side. The game was dominated by strong defensive play from both teams which resulted in just a single score, an England try from prop Bruno Brown. This gave England the win and made Ritson a member of the first English Grand Slam team. Ritson ended his international career with nine games, and never on the losing team in a Five Nations Championship match.

=== International games played ===
British Isles

- New Zealand 1908

England

- France 1910, 1912, 1913
- Ireland 1913
- Scotland 1910, 1913
- South Africa 1913
- Wales 1913

== Military career ==
In 1916 while a captain in the Durham Light Infantry, Ritson was awarded the Military Cross. The following year, acting as a temporary lieutenant colonel, he was awarded the Distinguished Service Order (DSO). On 15 April 1917 he was placed in charge of the 12th Battalion of the Scots Guard, replacing Lieutenant Colonel Harold Underhill Hatton Thorne, who had been killed at the Battle of Arras. Ritson remained in charge of the 12th Battalion until 15 July 1918. Ritson was later awarded a Bar to his DSO, and was Mentioned in Despatches four times during the war.

Ritson was the commanding officer of the 12th Battalion at Zonnenbeke, when on 20 September 1917 he was charged with clearing out several strongpoints which included five pillboxes and a fortified farmhouse. The resulting combat saw one of his Company's commanding officers, Captain Henry Reynolds, receive the Victoria Cross.

== Written works ==
- Modern Machine Mining in Great Britain (1938)
- Mine Supports During War Time (1940) with A. M. Bryan and M. A. Hogan

== Bibliography ==
- Griffiths, John (1982). The Book of English International Rugby 1872–1982. London: Willow Books. ISBN 0002180065.
