= Cask (disambiguation) =

A cask is a type of wooden container.

Cask or CASK may also refer to:

- CASK, a gene
- The Cask, 1920 novel by Freeman Wills Crofts
- Bag-in-box, a type of liquid container

== People ==
- Cask, a name; notable people with the name include:
  - Jason Cask (born 1971), Australian tennis player
  - Cask J. Thomson, Scottish musician and author

== See also ==
- Kask (disambiguation)
- Casque (disambiguation)
- CASC (disambiguation)
- KASC (disambiguation)
