= Peter Harding (metallurgist) =

- Born: 11 May 1919; Forest Hill, London, England
- Died: 24 January 2006 (aged 86)
- Military career
- Allegiance: United Kingdom
- Branch: Royal Air Force
- Service years: 1940–1945
- Rank: Pilot Officer
- Other work: Metallurgist

Peter Harding (11 May 1919 – 24 January 2006) was an RAF reconnaissance pilot, World War II Prisoner of War and participant in The Great Escape from Stalag Luft III, Peter Harding was a significant figure in the student life of the Royal School of Mines from 1946 until his death on 24 January 2006 at the age of 86. He conveyed historically useful information concerning the liberation of Allied POWs from Nazi camps at the end of World War II.

Peter Harding was born on 11 May 1919 and was schooled at Dulwich College. In 1939 he went up to Royal School of Mines, (a constituent of Imperial College), to study Metallurgy. He moved to Swansea when the department was evacuated in 1939 to avoid the threat of bombing.

He joined the University of London Air Squadron in 1939, with a view to learning to fly combat aircraft. Upon finding that undergraduate students were reserved from military duties, Harding deliberately failed his end of year examinations in order to enlist with the Royal Air Force as a pilot officer.

He flew Spitfire PR1 Photo Reconnaissance aircraft out of RAF Benson from early 1941. On 27 August 1941, while flying a sortie to photograph the harbour at Kiel, his engine failed at high altitude and he was forced to bail out over Nazi Germany. He was immediately apprehended and incarcerated.

== Experiences as a prisoner of war ==
After capture, Harding spent from 1941 to 1945 in a Prisoner of War camp, Stalag Luft III, the scene of many escape attempts. His severe asthma, which he had concealed from his RAF recruitment medical, prevented his participation in escape attempts. Instead he acted as an artificer, manufacturing items for use by escaping airmen. He had provided support and materials for numerous escape attempts, including those described in the films The Wooden Horse and The Great Escape. This involvement in escapes was not revealed until after Harding's death.

Harding indicated that in captivity he had no fear of his captors, save when two RAF prisoners arrived who had been mistakenly been initially sent to the Dachau concentration camp.

The inmates of the camps were carefully selected and trained military personnel. As such, Harding indicated that they found significant pleasure in the incompetence of the 3rd rate troops set to guard them.

In late 1944 he and his fellow prisoners were subjected to the forced march of Allied POWs from Eastern Germany in the face of advancing Soviet troops, during which he was forced to leave behind many personal objects, including his prison diary.

Harding was freed in 1945 by units of the Soviet army advancing into Germany, the camp guards having deserted their posts. Their liberation started with a protracted and indecisive duel between two armoured vehicles outside the camp. After a period the two vehicles realised that they were both in fact Russian and ceased fire. Harding stated that he and his colleagues had been extremely frightened by the wild behaviour of the Soviet troops, recalling that one soldier was drinking a liquid that appeared to be petrol.

== Later life ==
Upon repatriation, he completed his studies at the Royal School of Mines and pursued a successful career as a lead metallurgist at Enthoven and Son of Bermondsey.

After World War II, Harding was informed by a Rolls-Royce engineer that his model of aircraft had been upgraded from a MKI unit to MkII status, rather than being purpose built. As such, the earlier Merlin engine of Harding's aircraft lacked the heated carburettor of subsequent models, rendering it prone to icing of the barrels when running lean at high altitudes. Harding had fallen victim to the common practice of reconnaissance pilots, who tended to run their engines lean in order to conserve fuel for high speed escapes.

In 1992, the remains of Harding' aircraft were excavated by German aircraft historians and placed on display. Harding was present during the lifting of his machine, and was presented with many souvenirs, including the carburettor and the gun button.

Although a member of the Royal School of Mines, his loyalty and popularity led to his election to the drinking clubs of all three student bodies of Imperial College's constituent colleges, namely: Chaps (RSM); Links (City and Guilds); and 22 (Royal College of Science).

As well as his support at most Royal School of Mines student events and Royal School of Mines Association meetings for over fifty years, Harding was also known for his ability to give a faultless rendition of Eskimo Nell when requested.

Although for many years Harding had remained silent concerning his wartime experiences, in later years he decided to talk about his time flying Spitfires and in captivity, making several presentations, including to the Oxford Aeronautical Association.
