= Dyson School of Design Engineering =

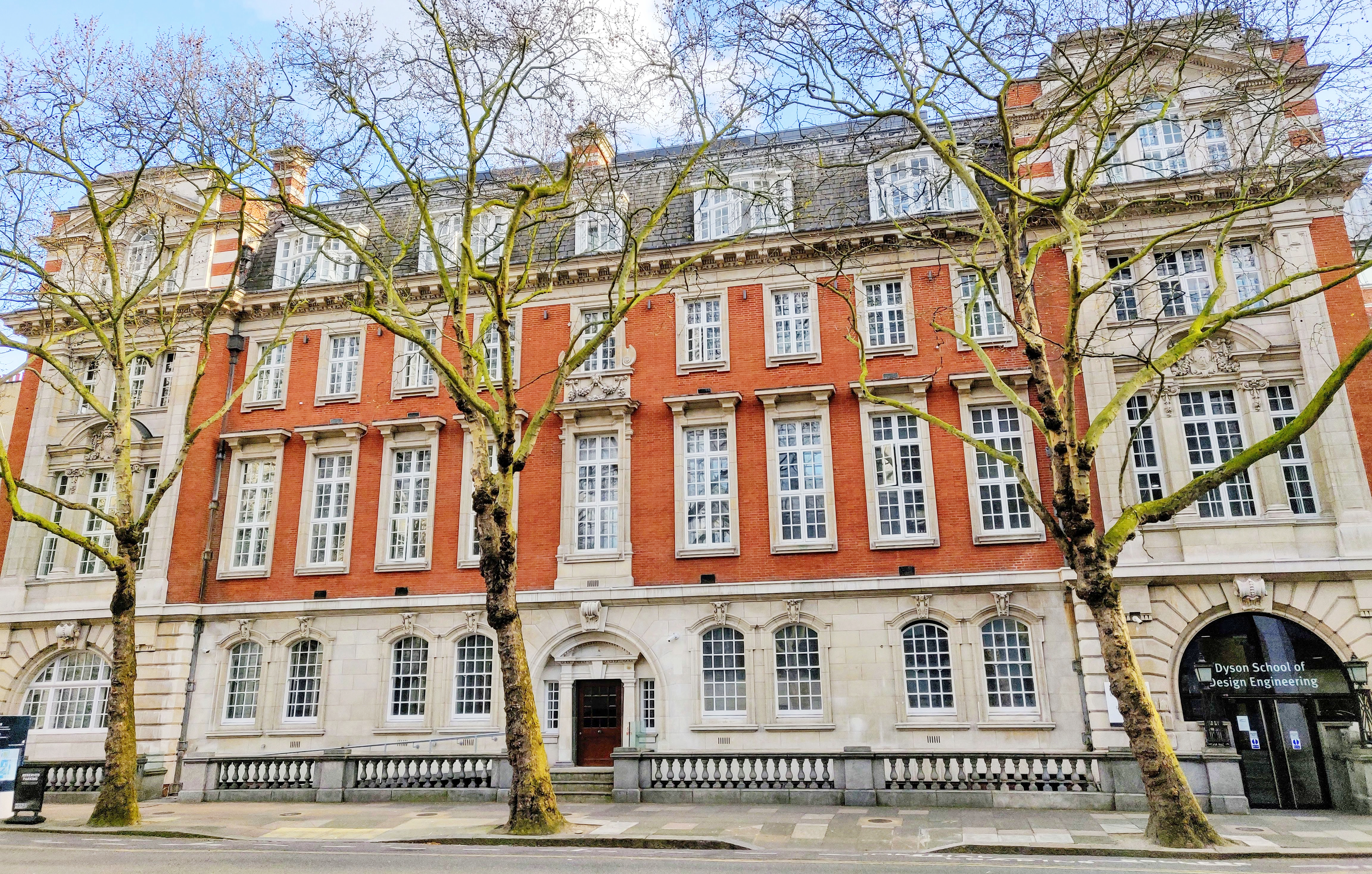
- Dyson Building on Imperial College Road
- Established: 2014
- Head of School: Professor Robert Shorten
- Faculty: Imperial College Faculty of Engineering
- Staff: 56
- Students: 409
- Location: Exhibition Road, London, United Kingdom; 51.497975°N 0.174382°W
- Campus: South Kensington
- Website: www.imperial.ac.uk/design-engineering
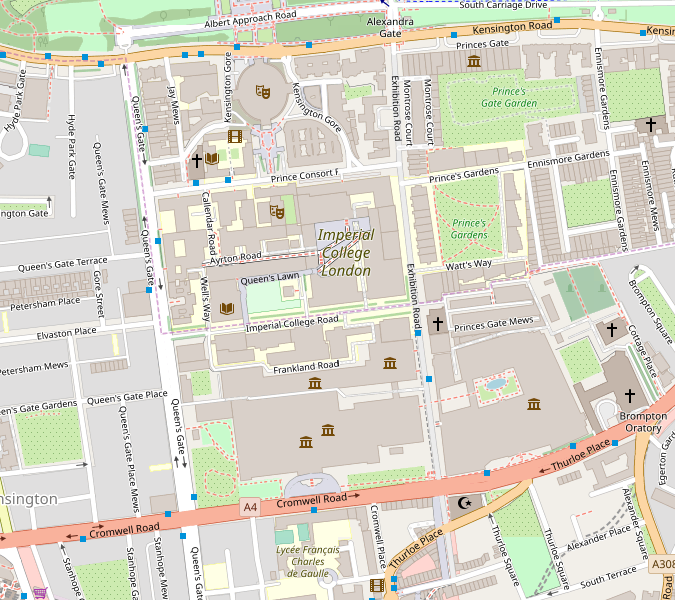
- Location within Albertopolis, South Kensington

The Dyson School of Design Engineering is an academic department of the Faculty of Engineering at Imperial College London in England. The school has just over 60 academic and teaching staff and 800 students, with over 350 undergraduates. The school is located in the Dyson building, at the corner of Exhibition and Imperial College roads.

== History ==
The school was founded in 2014 following a £12m donation by the James Dyson Foundation to the college, being the first new engineering division at Imperial for two decades. In 2018, the school moved into the newly-christened Dyson Building on Exhibition Road. The building was once the London headquarters of the Met Office, from 1910 to 1919, with some of the original interiors and signage preserved inside the entrance from Exhibition Road. Since then it has had various other uses, including as part of the Science Museum, which adjoins the building to the south, and as a post office. The renovation of the building was undertaken by Pascall+Watson, and cost £14 million.

== Academics ==
=== Study ===
The school offers a four-year integrated undergraduate Master of Engineering course, which started in 2015. The school offers five postgraduate courses, including a joint two-year postgraduate course with the Royal College of Art, Innovation Design Engineering, which awards a master's degree in each of art and science from the respective institutions. In addition, the school also offers four new specialised postgraduate courses including Cleantech Innovation (MSc), a joint course with Grantham Institute – Climate Change and the Environment, Design Engineering (MSc), Design with Behaviour Science (MSc), and [Design Engineering Research (MRes). As part of the Faculty of Engineering, undergraduates from the school are also awarded Associate of the City and Guilds of London Institute alongside their degree, and postgraduates are awarded the Diploma of Imperial College.

== People ==
=== Heads of School ===
- 2014-2019, Peter Childs FREng
- 2019–2023, Peter Cheung (also professor at the Department of Electrical and Electronic Engineering)
- 2023–present, Robert Shorten
