= Chris Toumazou =

British academic (born 1961)

Christofer Toumazou
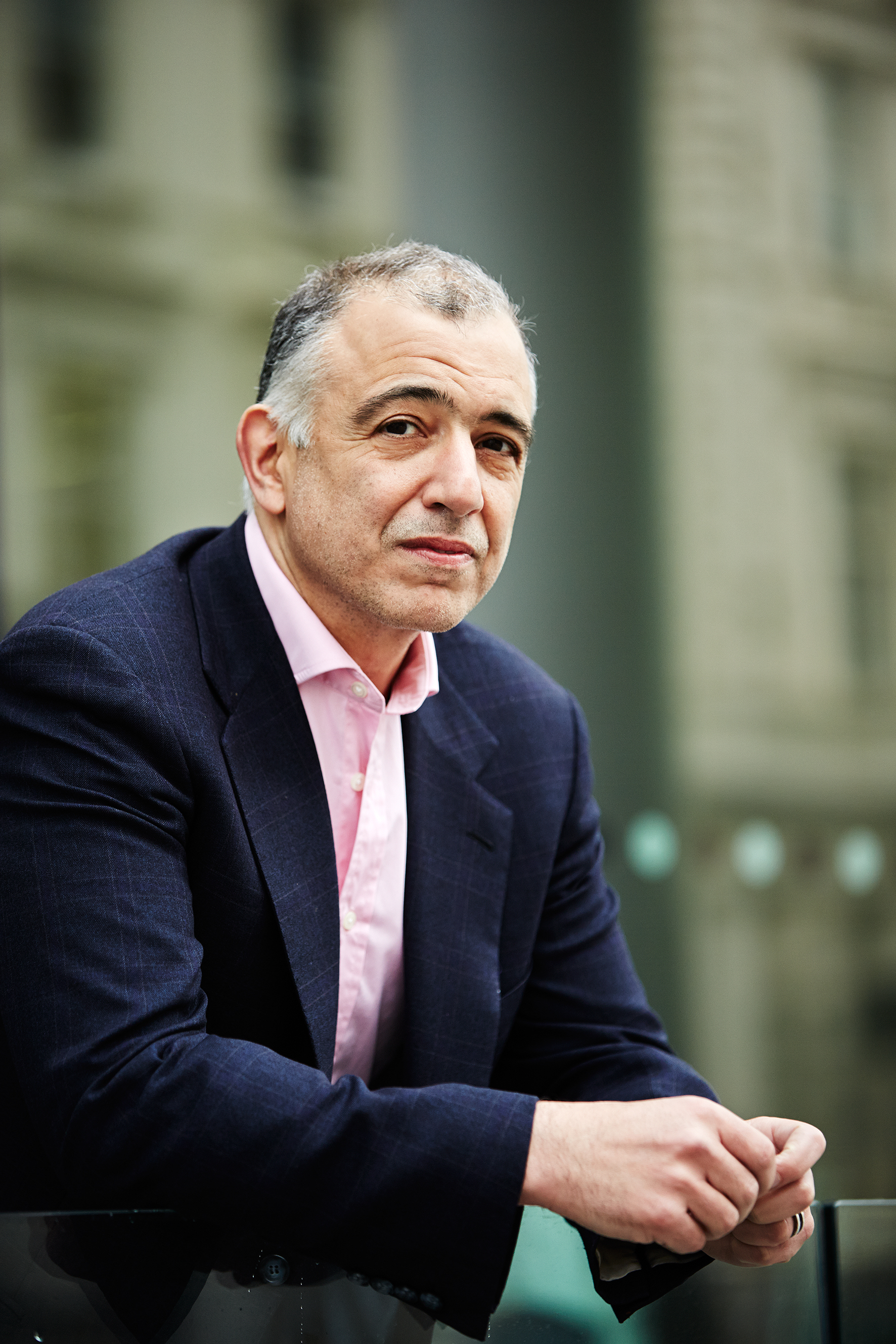
- Born: 5 July 1961 (age 65); Cheltenham, England
- Education: Oxford Brookes University
- Scientific career
- Fields: Electronic Engineering/Medical Technology
- Workplaces: Imperial College London
- Thesis: Universal current-mode analogue amplifiers (1986)
- Doctoral advisor: Francis John Lidgey

Christofer "Chris" Toumazou, CEng (Greek: Χριστόφορος Τουμάζου, born 5 July 1961) is a British Cypriot electronic engineer. He is perhaps best known for inventing a fast and portable means of genome sequencing, following his 13-year-old son's diagnosis with end stage kidney failure through a rare genetic mutation.

In 2013 he became London's first Regius Professor of Engineering conferred to Imperial College London.

For his inventions in semiconductor-based genetic testing he won the Gabor Medal of the Royal Society (2013) and European Inventor Award (2014). He is the first British winner of the prize in this contest since 2008.

== Biography ==
=== Early life ===
Born to Greek-Cypriot parents in Cheltenham, Toumazou trained to become an electrician, inspired by an English uncle who was an electrical engineer.

=== Academic career ===
Toumazou began undergraduate studies in 1980. He obtained both his undergraduate degree and doctorate at the then Oxford Polytechnic (now Oxford Brookes University). He moved to Imperial College London in 1986 as a Research Fellow in the Department of Electrical and Electronic Engineering becoming the youngest professor at Imperial in 1994 at the age of 33. He was appointed Head of the Circuits and Systems Group in the Department of Electrical and Electronic Engineering and then Head of the Department of Bioengineering in 2001.

In 2003 he raised a total of £22m to create the Institute of Biomedical Engineering at Imperial College London, a multidisciplinary research institute focusing on personalised medicine and nanobiotechnology, becoming its first director and chief scientist. His own specialism is in the field of personalised healthcare, providing worn or implantable devices for early diagnosis, and detection of disease.

=== Commercial career ===
Toumazou co-founded two companies which use silicon technology for early detection and management of chronic disease: Toumaz Technology Ltd and DNA Electronics Ltd.

=== Honours and awards ===
- 2008: elected Fellow of the Royal Academy of Engineering
- 2008: elected Fellow of The Royal Society
- 2011: awarded the J J Thomson medal from The Institution of Engineering and Technology
- 2013: elected Fellow of the Academy of Medical Sciences
- 2013: awarded Regius Professorship
- 2013: awarded Gabor Medal of the Royal Society
- 2014: winner of the European Inventor Award of the European Patent Office
- 2014: honorary fellowship, Cardiff University
- 2014: awarded Faraday Medal of the Institution of Engineering and Technology (IET)
- 2014: awarded IEEE Biomedical Engineering Award 2015
- 2016: honoured with Lifetime Achievement accolade at Elektra European Electronics Industry Awards
- 2020: awarded Joint Entrepreneur of the Year Award, UK BioIndustry Association (BIA)
- 2022: awarded UNESCO-Equatorial Guinea International Prize for Research in the Life Sciences

| Preceded by Post created | Regius Professor of Engineering; Imperial College London; 2013—present | Succeeded by Incumbent |
