= Associateships of Imperial College London =

Honorary degree-equivalent award presented by Imperial College London

- Location: London
- Country: United Kingdom
- Presented by: Imperial College London
- Eligibility: Imperial College undergraduate students
- Post-nominals: AICSM; ACGI; ARSM; ARCS
- Reward: Honorific post-nominals
- Status: Currently awarded

The Associateships of Imperial College London are honorary membership awards granted by the Imperial College London's former constituent colleges (which merged to form the Imperial College London in 1907). These awards are still conferred today alongside a degree from the Imperial College London.

The Associateships include the bachelor degree–equivalent awards the Associate of the Royal College of Science, the Associate of the City and Guilds of London Institute, the Associate of the Royal School of Mines, and the Associate of Imperial College School of Medicine, presented to undergraduates of Imperial College London who complete their studies at the relevant faculty. The Royal College of Science, and its sister institutions the Royal School of Mines and the City and Guilds College, were the original institutions that merged to form the Imperial College of Science and Technology, later Imperial College London, but were wholly absorbed into the College as part of the 2002 reshuffle that replaced the former colleges with faculties. However, the associateships are still awarded to graduates today.

Persons awarded one of the associateships are entitled to use the post-nominal letters ARCS, ACGI, ARSM, or AICSM respectively in addition to their standard designated degree post-nominals.

== See also ==
- Royal School of Mines
- Royal College of Science
- Imperial College School of Medicine
- City & Guilds of London Institute
- Diploma of Imperial College
