= Kask =

Kask or KASK may refer to:

- Kask (surname)
- Kask, Kerman, a village in Kerman Province, Iran
- Kask, Zanjan, a village in Zanjan Province, Iran
- Asta Kask, a punk band from Töreboda, Sweden
- KASK, an American radio station

== See also ==
- Cask (disambiguation)
- KASC (disambiguation)
- Karsk
