= Regius Professor of Engineering (Imperial) =

Regius Professor of Engineering Imperial College London
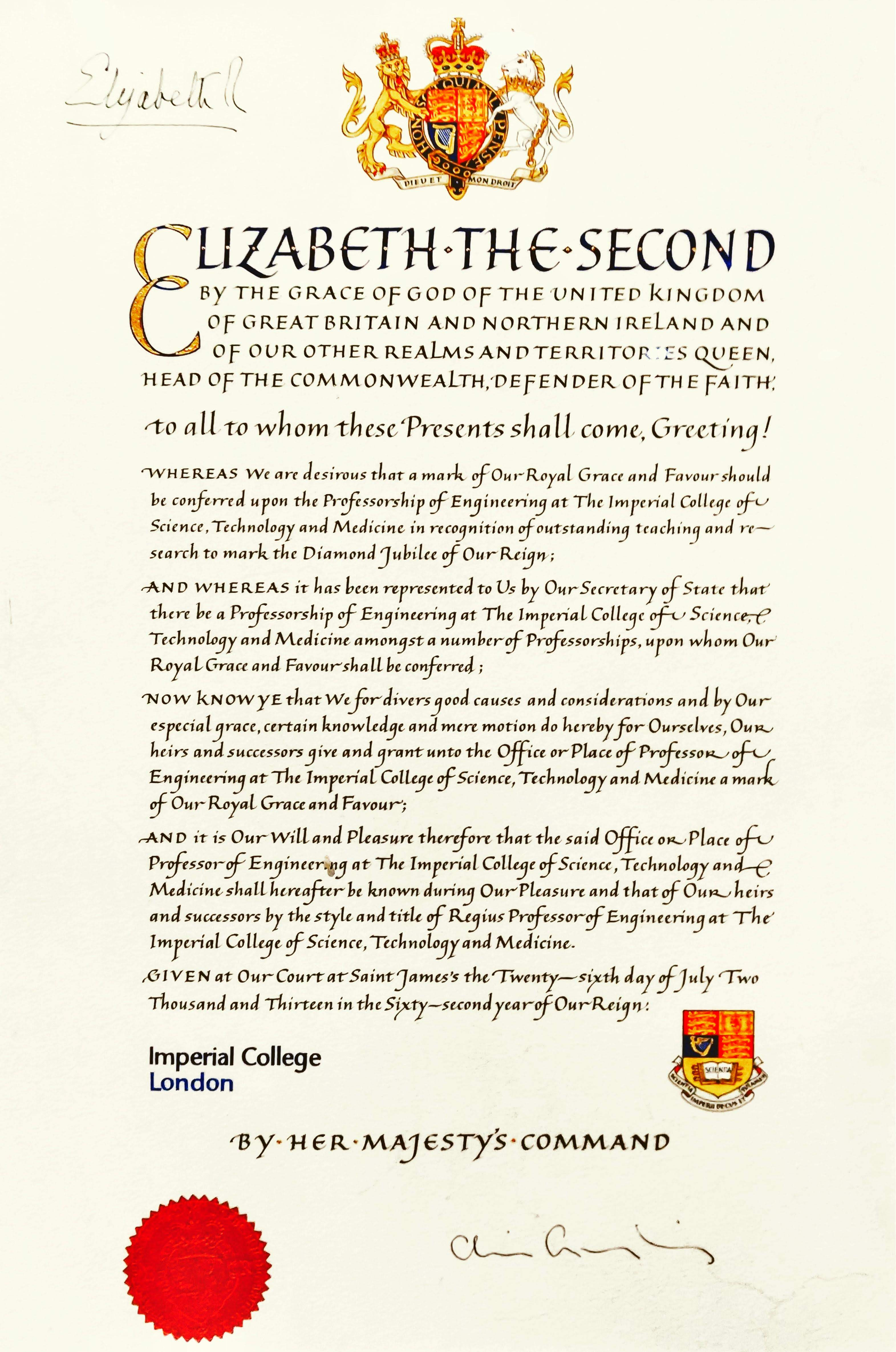
- Incumbent; Chris Toumazou since 2013
- Formation: 2013
- First holder: Chris Toumazou
- Website: www.imperial.ac.uk/engineering

The Regius Professor of Engineering is a royal professorship in engineering, established in 2013 at Imperial College London in England. The chair is attached to the college's Faculty of Engineering.

== History ==
In 2013 Queen Elizabeth II endowed a number of Regius Professors at 12 universities across the United Kingdom, expanding the title from what had originally been only at ancient universities. The chair was awarded as part of the Queen's 60th anniversary celebrations. It was the fourth Regius Professor of Engineering to be established, after the Regius Professor of Civil Engineering and Mechanics at Glasgow established in 1840, the Regius professorship at Edinburgh in 1868 and the professorship at Cambridge in 2011. The first chair was conferred on Chris Toumazou at the Commemoration day graduation ceremony on 23 October. Regius Toumazou is a professor in the Department of Electrical and Electronic Engineering.

== List of professors ==
- 2013−present ─ Chris Toumazou
