= Centre for Advanced Structural Ceramics =

English research institute

Coordinates: 51.499689°N 0.175635°W

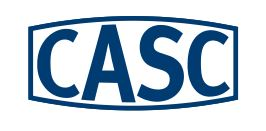
- Established: 2008
- Director: Professor Eduardo Saiz
- Students: 30
- Location: London, United Kingdom
- Website: www.imperial.ac.uk/structural-ceramics

The Centre for Advanced Structural Ceramics is a multidisciplinary research centre focusing on materials science and engineering involving ceramic materials for applications such as aerospace, energy and tissue engineering. It is located within Imperial College London in the United Kingdom. The college's Department of Materials is closely involved with the centre's research.

The centre was founded to facilitate research between associated institutions and academics, and the UK's industrial structural ceramics community, with a stated goal to provide a "critical mass of UK expertise in the fundamental understanding of structural ceramics that is highly relevant to key areas of the economy including, energy generation, aerospace and defence, transport and healthcare". Funding initially came through the Engineering and Physical Sciences Research Council but it is now funded through an industrial consortium, including members such as Rolls-Royce Holdings, Morgan Advanced Materials, and Reaction Engines.

The CASC's work draws from skills of multiple fields, including chemistry, physics, materials and earth sciences and business. It supports the dissemination of knowledge of ceramic materials through annual summer schools, industry days, workshops and lectures.
