= Royal School of Mines =

Former mining college, now part of the Imperial College

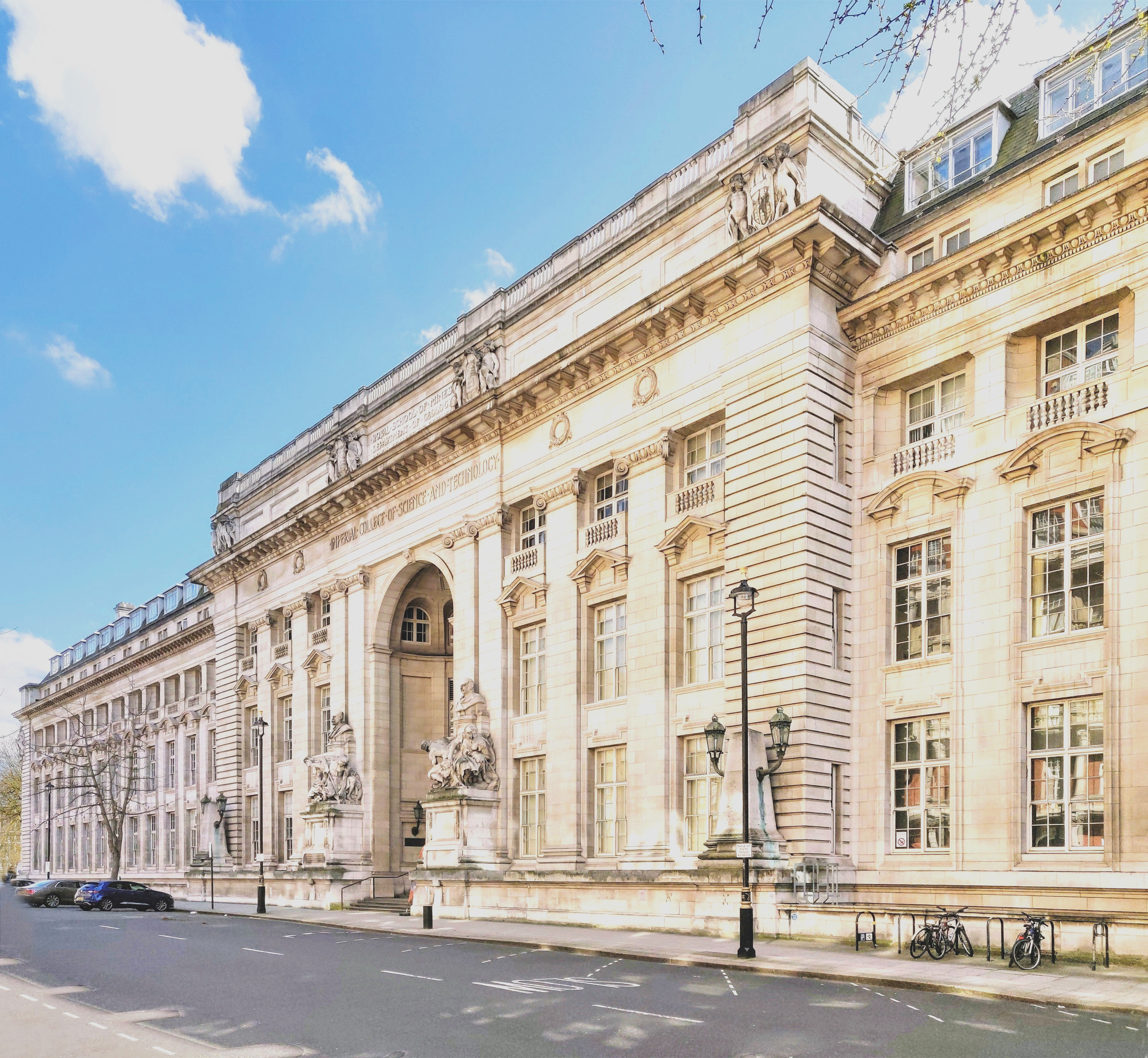
- Façade on Prince Consort Road
- Type: Public
- Established: 1851; 175 years ago (1907 as part of Imperial College)
- Parent institution: Imperial College London
- Affiliations: Imperial College Faculty of Engineering
- Students: approx. 800
- Location: Prince Consort Road, London, UK; 51.499796°N 0.175699°W
- Campus: Urban
Colours
- Website: www.union.ic.ac.uk/rsm/exec

The Royal School of Mines comprises the departments of Earth Science and Engineering, and Materials at Imperial College London. The Centre for Advanced Structural Ceramics and parts of the London Centre for Nanotechnology and Department of Bioengineering are also housed within the building. The school as an organisation no longer exists, having been incorporated into the Faculty of Engineering since 2003. Today the Royal School of Mines refers to both the departments associated with the former school, and the Grade II listed Edwardian building by Sir Aston Webb, which is viewed as a classic of academic architecture. The building and relevant student union still carry the name.

== History ==
The Royal School of Mines was established in 1851, as the Government School of Mines and Science Applied to the Arts. The School developed from the Museum of Economic Geology, a collection of minerals, maps and mining equipment made by Sir Henry De la Beche, and opened in 1841. The museum also provided some student places for the study of mineralogy and metallurgy. Sir Henry was the director of the Geological Survey of Great Britain, and when the collections outgrew the premises the museum and the survey were placed on an official footing, with government assistance.

The Museum of Practical Geology and the Government School of Mines and Science Applied to the Arts opened in a purpose-designed building in Jermyn Street in 1851. The officers of the Geological Survey became the lecturers and professors of the School of Mines. The Royal College of Chemistry was merged into it in 1853. The name was changed in 1863 to the Royal School of Mines, and was moved to South Kensington in 1872. In 1907, the school was incorporated into Imperial College of Science and Technology, but retained its own identity as a "constituent college".

In 2001 it was announced Imperial was to transition from a constituent college structure to a faculty structure, a move that was completed in 2003. The last Dean of the Royal School of Mines was Professor John Monhemius before the position was abolished. The Royal School of Mines has since come to refer to both the building in which former school was housed, as are its departments still today, and the student body representing students within those departments.

== Building ==
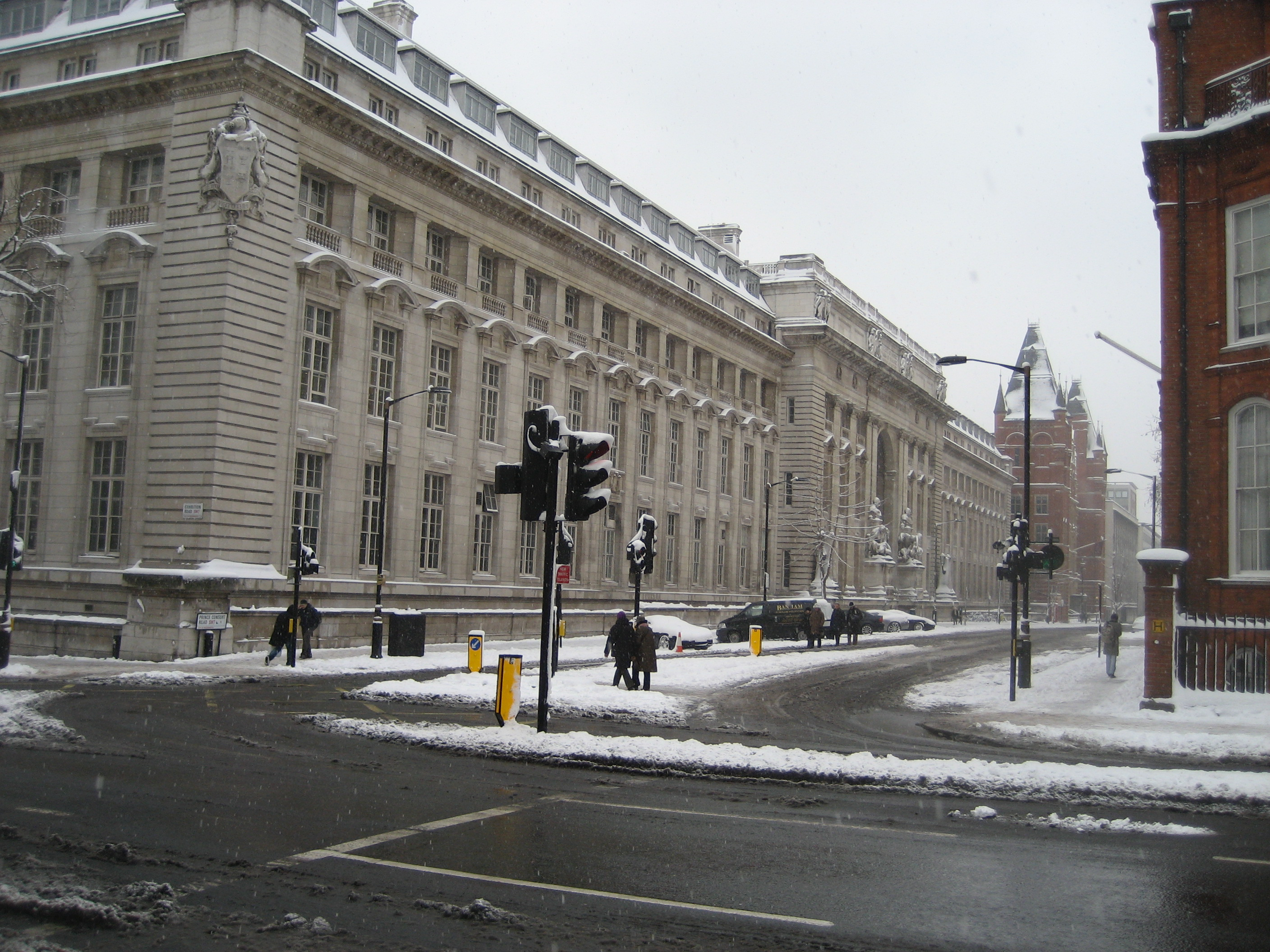
Goldsmith's Extension on the corner of Exhibition Road

Designed by Sir Aston Webb, the RSM building is classical in style with ionic pilasters. It was erected between 1909 and 1913 specifically to house the school, which was previously resident in the Huxley Building on Exhibition Road, now the Henry Cole Wing of the Victoria and Albert Museum. The foundation stone was laid by King Edward VII on 8 July 1909.

The RSM was the last of many buildings that Webb designed for the Albertopolis area (including the Cromwell Road frontage of the V&A) and, some would argue, his least resolved. Constructed in Portland stone, the entrance is formed by a three-storey, semicircular niche, flanked by two memorials (sculpted by Paul Raphael Montford, 1916–1920) to Alfred Beit and Julius Wernher who were major benefactors to the school. The western wing of the building is named after Webb, while the eastern end is named after the Goldsmiths' Company who helped to finance the building of the RSM.

=== In film ===
The distinctively Edwardian and academic styling cues used in the building's architecture have led to the RSM appearing in a number of film and television productions:

- 1965: The IPCRESS File. Directed by Sidney J. Furie and starring Michael Caine. The protagonist walks into the RSM and is magically transported to the old Science Museum Library.
- 1993: Agatha Christie's Poirot (ITV television). Appeared as the frontage and main entrance of "Imperial College" on "Exhibition Road" (although the RSM is on Prince Consort Road, off Exhibition Road) in the episode "The Underdog".
- 1995: Jack and Sarah. Directed by Tim Sullivan and starring Richard E. Grant. A wedding party exits from the front of the building, pausing for photographs etc. on the steps.
- 1998: Sliding Doors. Front entrance to the building is used as a registry office/town hall for a wedding scene.
- 2004: Hustle (BBC television). Generic university frontage, briefly seen as an architecture student exits and is then approached by the main characters.
- 2015: Kingsman. Directed by Matthew Vaughn and starring Colin Firth. Exterior and interiors used as the RSM building; subsequently shown to be blown up in a later scene.

== Students' Union ==
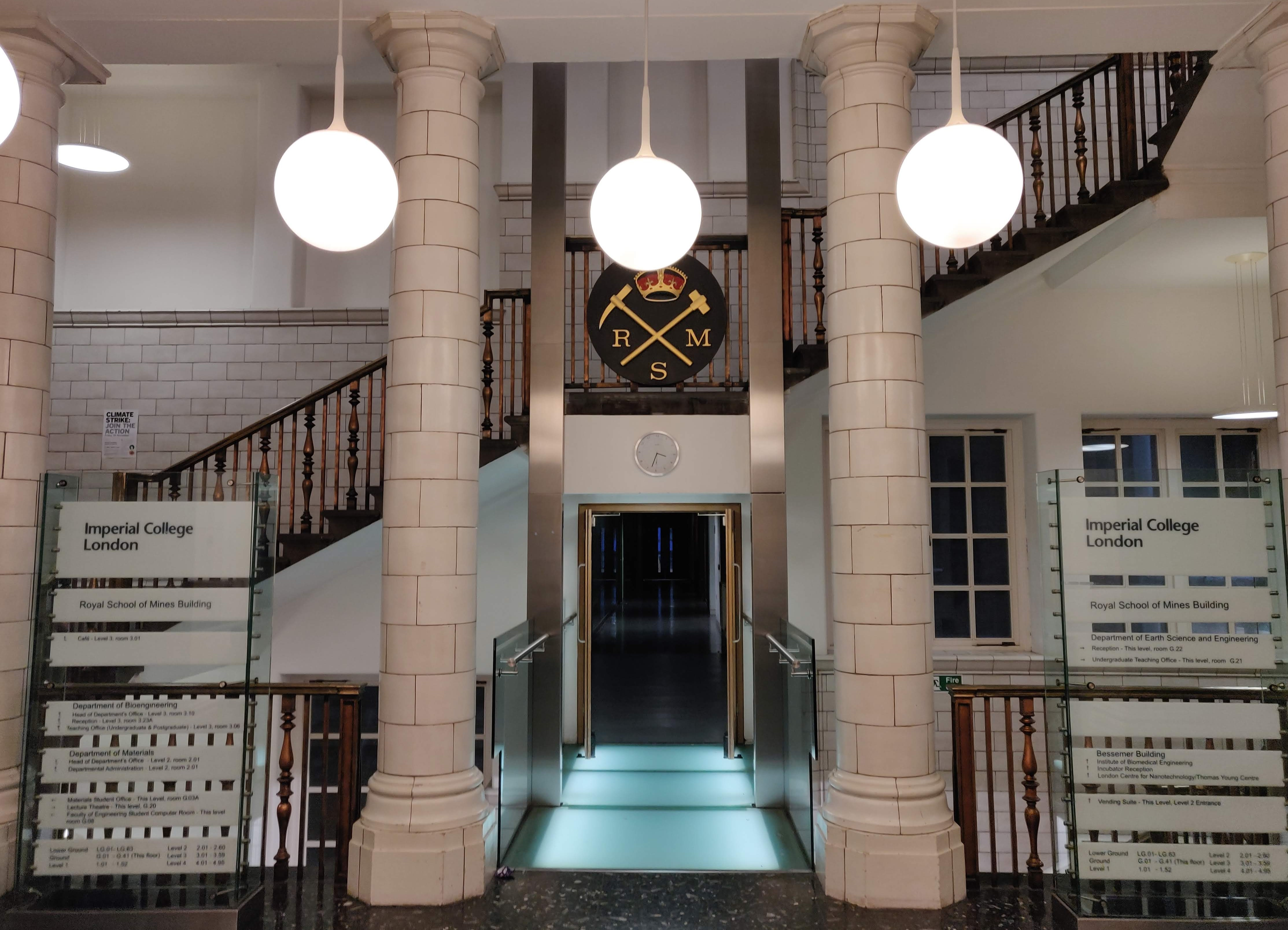
Main Entrance Hall

The RSM Union represents the interests and organises events for the students studying at the departments associated with the Royal School of Mines. It is part of the wider college union, and has a formal constitution guiding its activities around:

- The furthering of the interests of the members and the status of the RSM
- The promotion of sport within the RSM
- The promotion of interest in all aspects of geology and materials science
- The promotion of social intercourse among its members

The union runs sports teams, societies and events which span the academic year from October to July. The highlight of the sporting and social calendar is the annual Bottle Match against Camborne School of Mines, the second oldest rugby varsity match in the world.

The RSM Union is also responsible for looking after the RSM Mascots, Davy and Clementine II. Davy is a 3-foot (0.91 m) tall, 130-pound (60 kg) davy lamp, a type of mining lamp, and has been a mascot since 1965. Clementine II is a 1926 Morris T-Type One Ton Truck, bought by the RSM Union in 1960 to replace their previous motorised mascot Clementine I, a 1919 Aveling and Porter Traction Engine.

== People ==
Through societies such as the RSM Association and the Chaps Club, the RSM maintains a strong alumni network in the global mining community.

=== Alumni and professors ===
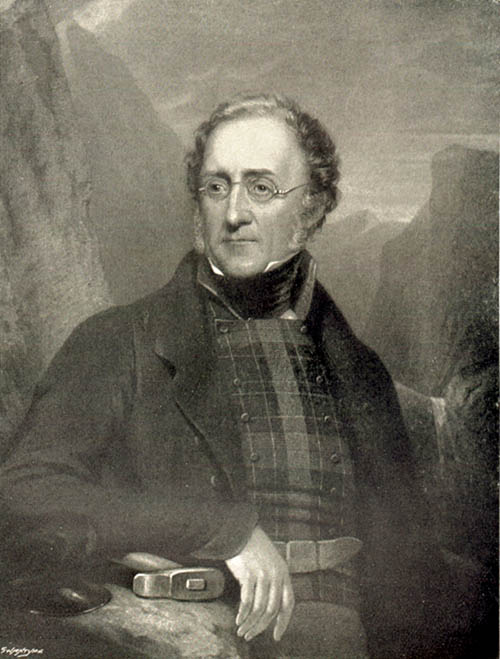
Henry Thomas de la Beche

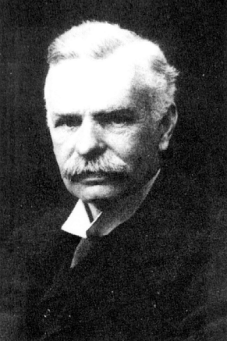
Richard Dixon Oldham

- James Allen, New Zealand politician and diplomat.
- George Frederick Ansell, author of a standard work on the Royal Mint
- Sir Henry De la Beche FRS, founder of the British Geological Survey.
- Peter Baxendell, former managing director of Shell.
- Fernando Benitez, Spanish mining engineer, main promoter and founding general manager of Chile's first state-owned copper refinery, located at Paipote.
- Henry Francis Blanford, meteorologist and palaeontologist. Founding head of the India Meteorological Department.
- William Thomas Blanford CIE FRS, geologist, zoologist and naturalist. Geological Society Wollaston Medallist and president (1888).
- Henry Yorke Lyell Brown, Australian exploration geologist, noted for his work in Western Australia.
- Sir C. V. Boys FRS, experimental physicist.
- Frederic Creswell, mining engineer and Minister of Defence in South Africa
- Edmund Daukoru, Minister of Energy for Nigeria and former OPEC President (2006).
- Sir Edgeworth David FRS, Welsh-born Australian geologist and Antarctic explorer who led the first expedition to reach the Magnetic South Pole.
- George E. Davis, pioneer in the field of chemical engineering.
- George Mercer Dawson, director of the Geological Survey of Canada (1895–1901).
- Robert Etheridge, Junior, Anglo-Australian palaeontologist.
- Andy Fanshawe, mountaineer.
- Sir Lewis Leigh Fermor, igneous and metamorphic geologist, former director of the Geological Survey of India and founding president of the Indian National Science Academy.
- Lily-Mae Fisher Royal Navy commando
- Peter Francis, author and volcanologist.
- Sir Edward Frankland FRS, leading chemist and originator of the concept of valency.
- Professor William Fyfe CC FRS FRSC FRSNZ, eminent geochemist, winner of 15 major medals including the Logan Medal, the Wollaston Medal and the Roebling Medal.
- Sir Patrick Geddes FRSE, biologist, sociologist, philanthropist and pioneering town planner.
- Percy Gilchrist, British chemist and metallurgist who devised a standard method of making steel, with his cousin Sidney Gilchrist Thomas.
- Rudolph Glossop, British engineering geologist and pioneer of soil mechanics who was one of the founding members of Géotechnique.
- Professor William Gowland FRS, British mining engineer and archaeologist. Known as the Father of Japanese Archaeology.
- Mohammed bin Hamad Al Rumhy, Minister of Oil and Gas in the Sultanate of Oman.
- Frank Hawthorne OC FRSC, Canadian mineralogist and crystallographer. Geological Association of Canada Logan Medallist.
- Arthur Holmes, British geologist and pioneer of radiometric rock dating. Geological Society Wollaston Medallist and Geological Society of America Penrose Medallist.
- Prof A. K. Huntington, professor of metallurgy at King's College London (1879–1919), president of Institute of Metals (1913–1914) and aviation pioneer.
- Thomas Henry Huxley PC FRS, Professor of Natural History 1854–1885. Comparative anatomist; 'Darwin's Bulldog', author of Man's place in nature.
- John Wesley Judd, president of the Geological Society (1886–1888).
- Ivan Kostov (Nikolov), Bulgarian mineralogist, President of the International Mineralogical Association (1982–1986).
- Jeremy Leggett, social entrepreneur and author.
- Archibald Liversidge FRS, English-born Australian chemist, founder of the Australasian Association for the Advancement of Science.
- Rilwanu Lukman KBE, former secretary general of OPEC.
- Rachel, Lady MacRobert, philanthropist and founder of the MacRobert Trust.
- John Milne, Established the first global seismic network and seismic hazard maps based on instrumental records. Founder of the Seismological Society of Japan. Lyell medallist (1894) and Royal medallist (1908).
- Sir Roderick Murchison KCB FRS, Scottish geologist who first described and investigated the Silurian system. Royal Society Copley Medallist and Geological Society Wollaston Medallist.
- Noel Odell, English geologist and mountaineer, oxygen officer for the 1924 British Mount Everest expedition.
- Richard Dixon Oldham FRS, Irish geologist who first identified seismic p- and s-waves and found the first evidence for the Earth's core. President of the Geological Society (1920–1922).
- Benjamin Neeve Peach, FRS, geologist in the Geological Survey who resolved the formation of the Scottish Highlands.
- Sir Andrew Ramsay FRS, Scottish geologist and glaciologist. Geological Society Wollaston Medallist and president (1872).
- John G. Ramsay, British structural geologist. Geological Society Wollaston Medallist.
- Herbert Harold Read, British geologist who performed much work on the origins of granite. Geological Society Wollaston Medallist.
- Thomas Arthur Rickard, mining engineer and also publisher and author on mine engineering subjects after whom Rickardite is named.
- Sir Aurelian Ridsdale, politician and chairman of the British Red Cross Society (1912–1914).
- Professor John Anthony Sydney Ritson OBE DSO, international rugby player (England and the British Lions), decorated soldier, and mining engineer.
- William Saville-Kent, marine biologist and author
- Professor Douglas Shearman, British sedimentologist, Geological Society Wollaston Medallist.
- Sir Warington Wilkinson Smyth FRS, president of the Geological Society (1866–1868).
- William Johnson Sollas FRS, geologist and anthropologist. President of the Geological Society (1908–1910).
- George Reginald Starr DSO MC, mining engineer and Special Operations Executive officer.
- Ralph Tate, British-born Australian botanist and geologist. President of the Royal Society of South Australia (1878–1879).
- Sir Julius Vogel, Prime Minister of New Zealand (1873–1875).
- Professor George P. L. Walker FRS, mineralogist and volcanologist. Geological Society Wollaston Medallist and IAVCEI Thorarinsson Medallist.
- Professor Janet Watson FRS, igneous and metamorphic petrologist. First female president of the Geological Society (1982–1984).
- Sir Julius Wernher, German-born Randlord and art collector.
- Howel Williams, leading volcanologist.
- Robert Willis (engineer), engineer and architectural historian.
- Peter Harding (Royal School of Mines), metallurgist and captured WWII pilot (1919–2006)
- George Ekem Ferguson, a Fante, in the then Gold Coast, who after his education at the RSM, went on to negotiate treaties in the upper savannah of the Gold Coast.

=== List of deans ===
Before it was incorporated into the Faculty of Engineering, the school was led by a dean. The deans were:

- 1943–45 : Herbert Harold Read FRS
- 1945–47 : William Richard Jones
- 1947–49 : John Anthony Sydney Ritson
- 1950–51 : Cecil William Dannatt
- 1952–59 : David Williams
- 1959–62 : James Cecil Mitcheson
- 1962–65 : John Geoffrey Ball
- 1965–68 : John Sutton FRS
- 1968–71 : Marston Grieg Fleming FREng
- 1971–74 : John Geoffrey Ball (2nd term)
- 1974–77 : John Sutton FRS (2nd term)
- 1977–80 : Peter Lynn Pratt
- 1980–83 : John Lawrence Knill
- 1983–86 : Edwin Thomas Brown FREng
- 1986–89 : David William Pashley FRS
- 1989–91 : John Stuart Archer FREng
- 1991–95 : Charles Timothy Shaw
- 1995–98 : Rees David Rawlings
- 1998–2000 : John Anthony Kilner FREng
- 2000–04 : Andrew John Monhemius
