= Tilly Collins =

British entomologist and ecologist

Tilly Collins FRES
- Education: University of Sussex (BSc); Imperial College London (PhD)
- Scientific career
- Workplaces: Imperial College London; University of Leeds; Harper Adams University

Tilly Collins FRES is a British entomologist and ecologist. She is Deputy Director of the Centre for Environmental Policy at Imperial College.

== Education and career ==
Collins studied tree surgery at Merrist Wood in 1994, and graduated with BSc Ecology from the University of Sussex in 1997. Her PhD in 2001 looked at on stem feeding willow aphid species, supervised by Simon Leather at Imperial College London.

Collins stayed on at Imperial as a postdoc, moved to a teaching position at the University of Leeds, and then returned to Imperial in 2002 as a Teaching Fellow in Biology. In 2012 she was also working as a Senior Lecturer in Entomology at Harper Adams University.

She progressed to Senior Teaching Fellow at Imperial, and by 2023 was appointed Deputy Director the Centre of Environmental Policy.

== Research ==
Collins' research has a broad remit within applied ecology.

She has worked with the Target Malaria project to model mosquito populations under different control methods, showing that removing a malaria vector mosquito species would not affect the wider ecosystem, as non disease carrying mosquitoes would fill ecological niche.

Collins supports the incorporation of insect protein into regular human diets, and her research showed that they can be efficiently farmed with less resources than that of vertebrate animals.

Her work has also looked at environmental pollution, showing that the use of curved road barriers, provide better protection for pedestrians from air pollution rather than straight. More recently she has looked at the environmental impacts of parasite treatments in pets, finding high levels of pesticides in freshwater, because of run off from pesticide treated dogs swimming.

Her socio economic work on human interactions with the environment, has showed how allotment community activities can have mental and physical health benefits.

== Writing Work ==
Collins has written several book chapters, including The potential of insect farming to increase food security with Flora Dickie and Monami Miyamoto, and How might we overcome ‘Western’ resistance to eating insects? with Harry McDade, both within Edible Insects, edited by Heimo Mikkola in 2020.

She also contributed to Insect and other pests of poplars and willows, within Poplars and Willows: Trees for society and the environment by J. G. Isebrands, J. Richardson in 2014.

== Public activities ==
Collins regularly carries out public science communication activities. In 2019 she spoke at the Pint of Science festival on Good Grub: How eating insects can make our diets more sustainable

She has appeared on BBC Radio 4's Loose ends programme talking about her entomophagy activity at the 2019 Great Exhibition Road Festival, and she also took part in the 2022 and 2023 festivals with similar activities. In 2020 she was interviewed by the Making the world better podcast talking about the role insects can play in the global food system.

In 2026 she appeared the BBC Radio 4 programme Toxic! episode Swept Under the Rug talking about environmental pollution from pet flea treatments.
