= Imperial College Radio =

Student radio station at Imperial College London

Coordinates: 51.5001°N 0.1780°W

ICRadio

England
- Broadcast area: Imperial College London
- Frequency: Internet radio

Programming
- Format: Contemporary

Ownership
- Owner: Independent

History
- First air date: 1976

Links
- Webcast: http://www.icradio.com/live/128mp3
- Website: http://www.icradio.com

Imperial College Radio or IC Radio is the student radio station at Imperial College London.

== History ==
IC Radio was founded in November 1975 with the intention of broadcasting to the student halls of residence from a studio under Southside. Broadcasting actually commenced in late 1978 on 999 AM when it became the first non-campus student station licensed, although IC Radio has since stopped broadcasting over this frequency. Imperial College Radio pioneered a new system of broadcast, known as Leaky feeder and was the first station to be licensed by the Home Office for the use of this technique. For a short period in 1989, IC Radio broadcast on FM under a Test and Development licence, but this way never expanded into a full FM licence. In 2001 it moved to its current location, in the West Basement of Beit Quad over the internet www.icradio.com and, since 2004, on 1134 AM in Wye.

== Studios ==
Historically, Imperial College Radio consisted of two studios, "Southside" and "Northside", named after the accommodation blocks under which they were situated. Southside was the main broadcast studio, whilst Northside was primarily designated as a recording/production studio. The two studios were linked via audio cables which ran through the College's system of service tunnels, enabling communications, and the ability for the Southside studio to broadcast the output of the Northside studio.

After relocating to the basement of Beit Quad in 2001, Imperial College Radio combined both studios in a single building, but retained its two-studio setup, with one studio focussed towards recording and another to live broadcast. Both studios were also greatly upgraded in terms of equipment.

== Crocodile Club ==
The Alumni association for Imperial College Radio is known as The Crocodile Club, and was formed in 1985 by a group of students who were members of Imperial College Radio. The intention was to make sure that when people left the hallowed halls of Imperial College, that there was an easy way for them to keep in touch with each other, meet up now and then, and generally keep the fire burning. Further to this, Reggie was set up as the club's official annual handbook, to publicise events, circulate the membership address list and provide an airing for the members many views and opinions.
