= Centre for Environmental Policy, Imperial College London =

English research unit

Centre for Environmental Policy
- Type: Academic Department
- Established: 1977
- Director: Professor Jem Woods
- Location: London, United Kingdom; 51.500177°N 0.171948°W
- Campus: Urban
- Website: www.imperial.ac.uk/environmental-policy

The Centre for Environmental Policy (CEP) is a department of the Faculty of Natural Sciences at Imperial College London. Its aim is to influence a wide range of environmental issues through research on the environmental, energy and health aspects of global problems. CEP's current director is Professor Jem Woods.

== History ==
The Centre for Environmental Policy was first established in 1977 as the Interdepartmental Centre for Environmental Technology (ICCET). ICCET was the first of many interdisciplinary centres within Imperial College London to cross traditional boundaries between departments. It aims “to produce quality research, teaching and advice on environmental matters”. Whilst Imperial College is known for its scientific and technological activities, the centre was established to combine these with the legal, medical, economic and sociological aspects of the environment, with particular emphasis on cross-linkages between the disciplines. CEP has since evolved to cover a wide range of science, technology and policy research, teaching within the broad disciplines of physical and natural environment and more specifically in the energy, agriculture and international development fields.

CEP focuses primarily on evidence-based policy making with an emphasis on social sciences relevant to the environment and to the interface between science and policy in key environmental subjects. This work is often carried out in collaboration with other departments at Imperial College London.

In addition to research opportunities, the department offers two Postgraduate Taught and Research degrees – PhDs and the MSc in Environmental Technology.

CEP is organized in functional groups around research topics, and teaching is related closely to the research groups by subject.

== Notable Alumni, Faculty and Staff ==
- Helen ApSimon
- Professor Sir Gordon Conway
- Lord Flowers
- Kaveh Madani
- James Skea, Professor of Sustainable Energy
- Tilly Collins

== Sources ==
1. Imperial College London official website
2. Imperial College Faculty of Natural Sciences website
3. Centre for Environmental Policy website
