= Blackett Laboratory =

Physics research and teaching laboratory at Imperial College London

Blackett Laboratory, Imperial College London
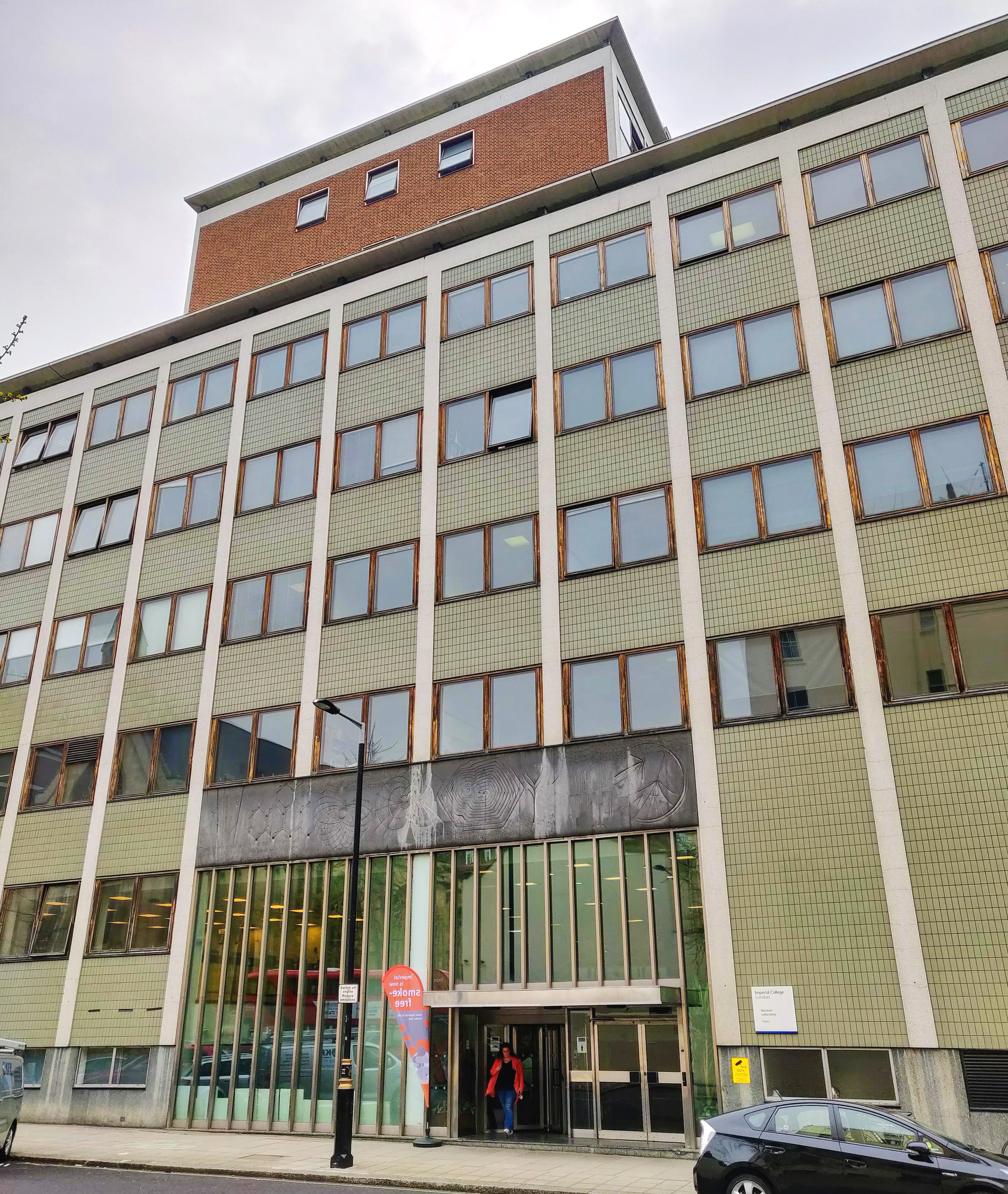
- The front of the laboratory, from Prince Consort Road
- Established: 1961 (Department since 1906)
- Head of Department: Professor Stefan Söldner-Rembold
- Faculty: Imperial College Faculty of Natural Sciences
- Students: 1,316
- Location: Prince Consort Road, London, United Kingdom; 51°29′58″N 0°10′45″W
- Campus: South Kensington
- Website: www.imperial.ac.uk/physics
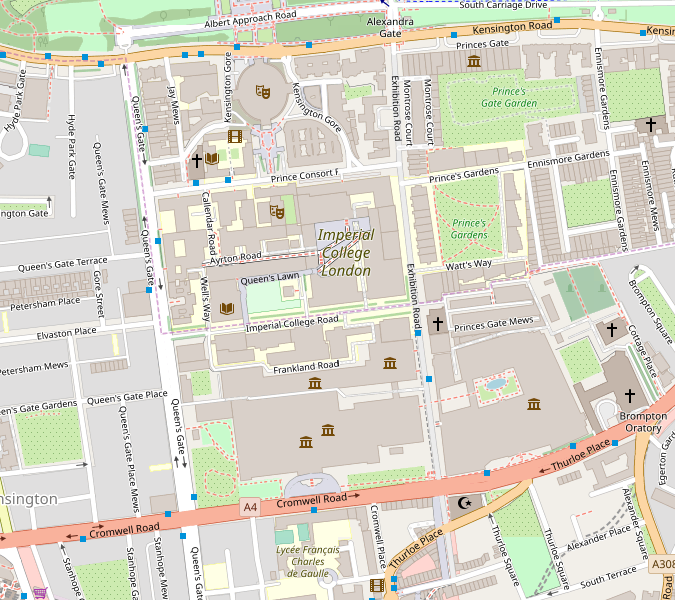
- Location within Albertopolis, South Kensington

The Blackett Laboratory is a building of the Faculty of Natural Sciences at Imperial College London in England, United Kingdom. It has housed the Department of Physics at Imperial College London since the building's completion in 1961.

Named after experimental physicist Patrick Blackett who established a laboratory at the college, the building is located on the corner of Prince Consort Road and Queen's Gate, Kensington. The department ranks 12th on QS's 2025 world university rankings.

== History ==
The Department of Physics at Imperial College dates back to the physics department of the Normal School of Science, later the Royal College of Science. As part of the formation of Imperial, the Royal College was moved into a new building at South Kensington in 1906, which also housed the Chemistry Department. From 1906 to 1932 the head of the Physics Department was Prof. H. L. Callender, famous for his work on the properties of steam.

G P Thomson (son of J J Thomson) replaced Callender in 1932, and worked in part on nuclear physics and atomic weaponry. He was followed P. M. S. Blackett as head in around 1953, with the construction of the new Physics building starting at about the same time. Blackett refocused efforts from low-energy physics to high-energy nuclear physics, and under him research started into cosmic rays and the use of bubble chambers, with the first liquid hydrogen bubble chamber in Western Europe being constructed at the department. Work on satellite instrumentation resulted in departmentally designed equipment ending up on NASA satellites in 1962. Physics continued in the new “old” RCS building until the new Physics building was finished in 1961, which subsequently became known as the Blackett Laboratory. In 2019, it was announced that the laboratory would be constructing a magnetometer instrument for the European Space Agency Solar Orbiter in a mission to study the Sun. The satellite launched on an Atlas V from the Cape Canaveral AFS, Florida on the 9 February, 2020. In November 2019, a team of Imperial physicists was chosen to design parts of the Deep Underground Neutrino Experiment, which is to be a long baseline accelerator neutrino experiment in the United States.

== Academics ==
=== Study ===
==== Undergraduate ====
The department offers three year BSc and four year undergraduate MSci courses. The department has connections with universities in Europe, allowing undergraduate master's students to study-abroad during their course. All students graduating with an undergraduate degree from the department are also awarded the Associateship of the Royal College of Science, ARCS. This degree is professionally accredited by the Institute of Physics. Holders of accredited degrees can follow a route to Institute Membership and the CPhys professional qualification.

==== Postgraduate ====
Taught postgraduate courses last for one year leading to a MSc, with research degrees leading to either a MRes or PhD. All students graduating with any of the postgraduate degrees (MSc, MRes, PhD) are also awarded the Diploma of Imperial College, DIC. There are also a number of short-courses for practising engineers.

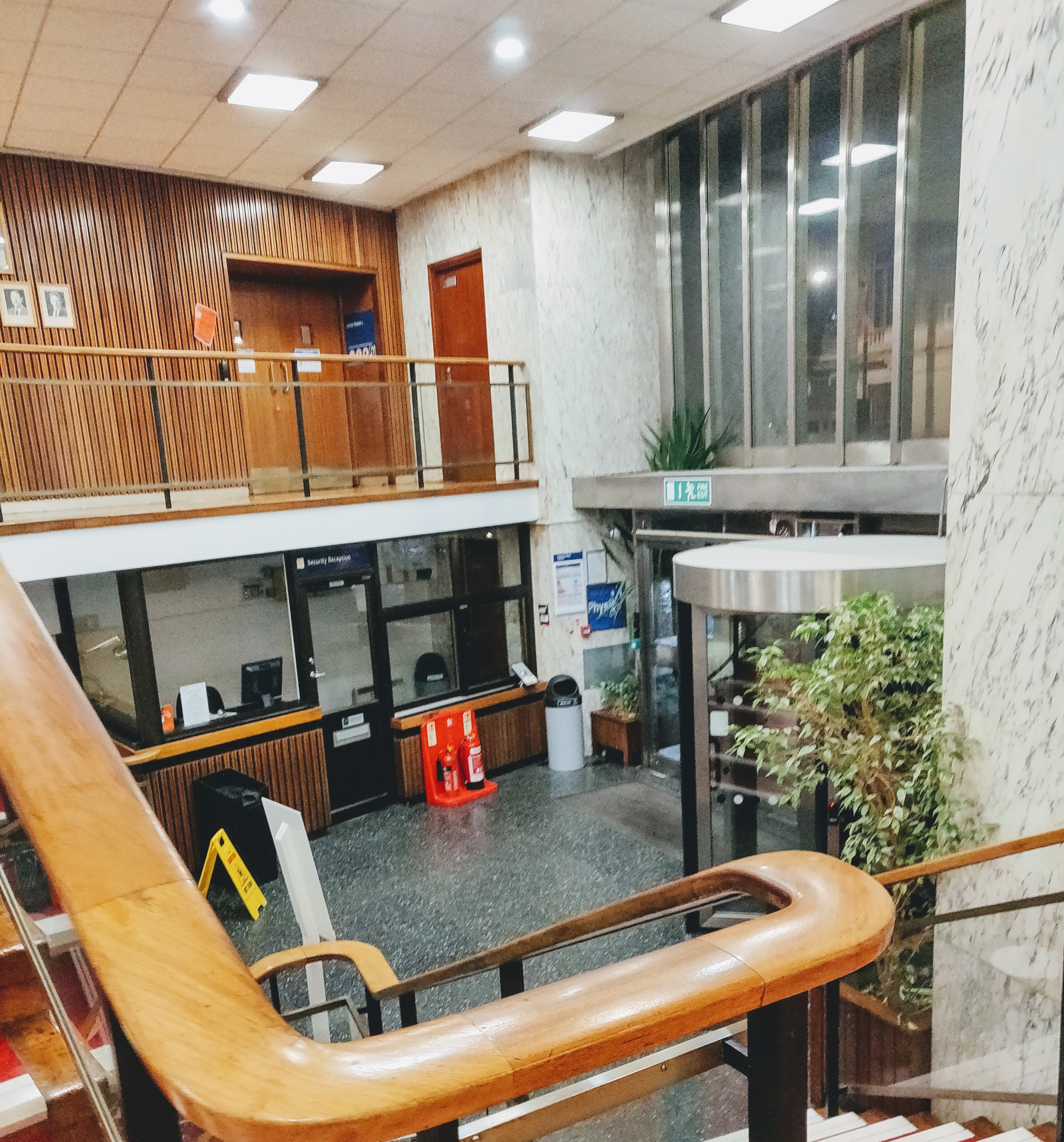
Entrance Hall off Prince Consort Road

=== Rankings ===
The college ranks 9th on the Times Higher Education natural sciences subjects rankings, and the department in particular ranks 12th in the world, and 3rd in the UK after Cambridge and Oxford, on the QS World University Rankings. Domestically, the department ranks 6th in the Complete University Guide's 2021 physics rankings.

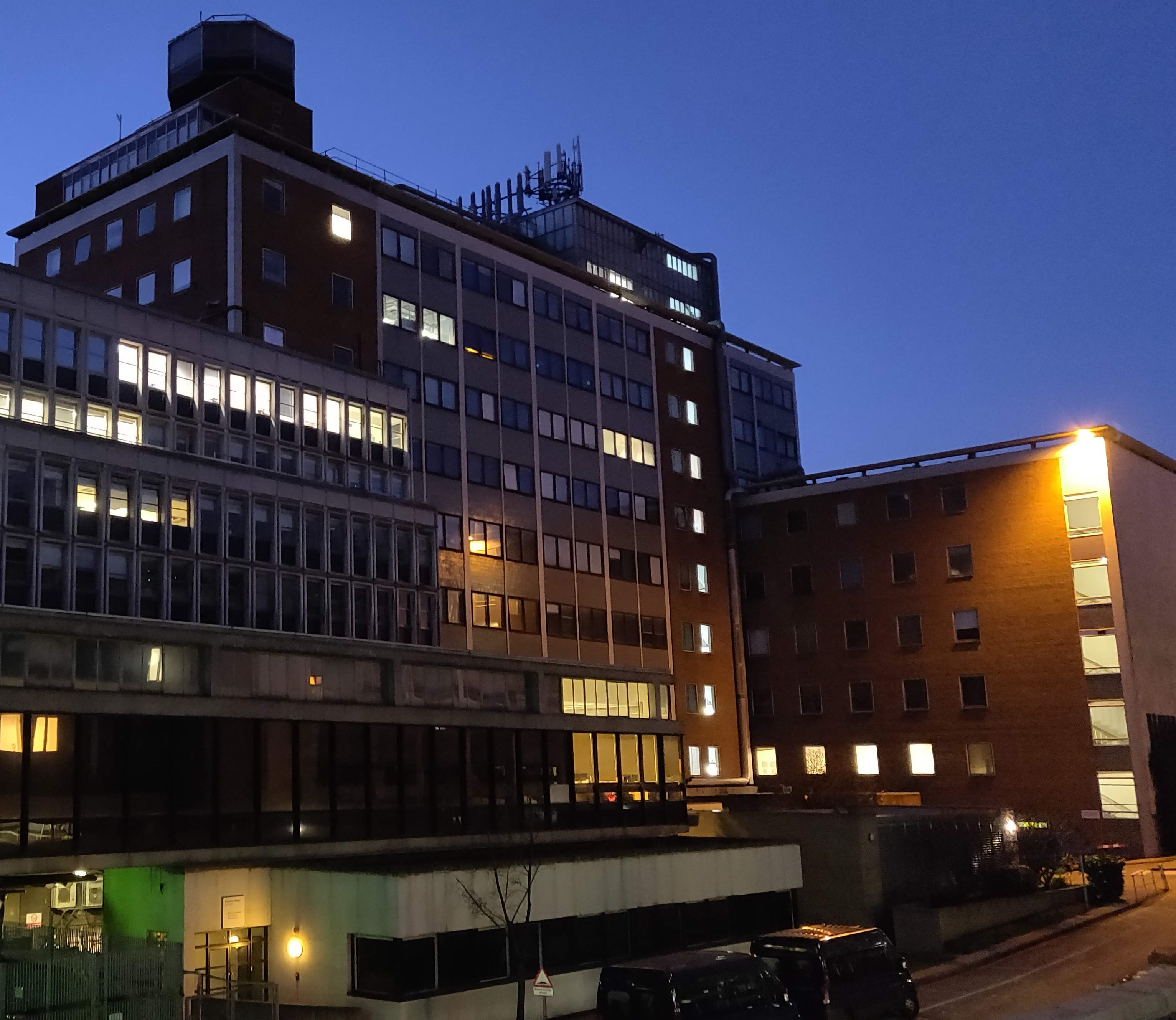
A view of the laboratory from the main walkway

== People ==
The laboratory has connections to many physicists who had studied or taught at the department:

- Sir Peter Knight
- Sir John Pendry
- Sir Tom Kibble
- Sir Tejinder Singh Virdee
- Sir Steven Cowley
- Edward Hinds
- Jenny Nelson
- Fay Dowker
- Jess Wade
- Michele Dougherty
- Joanna Haigh
- Matt Taylor
- Abdus Salam
- Libby Jackson of the UK Space Agency
- Jonathan Pritchard (2017 of the Fowler Award for Astronomy)
