= Faculty of Natural Sciences, Imperial College London =

British college faculty

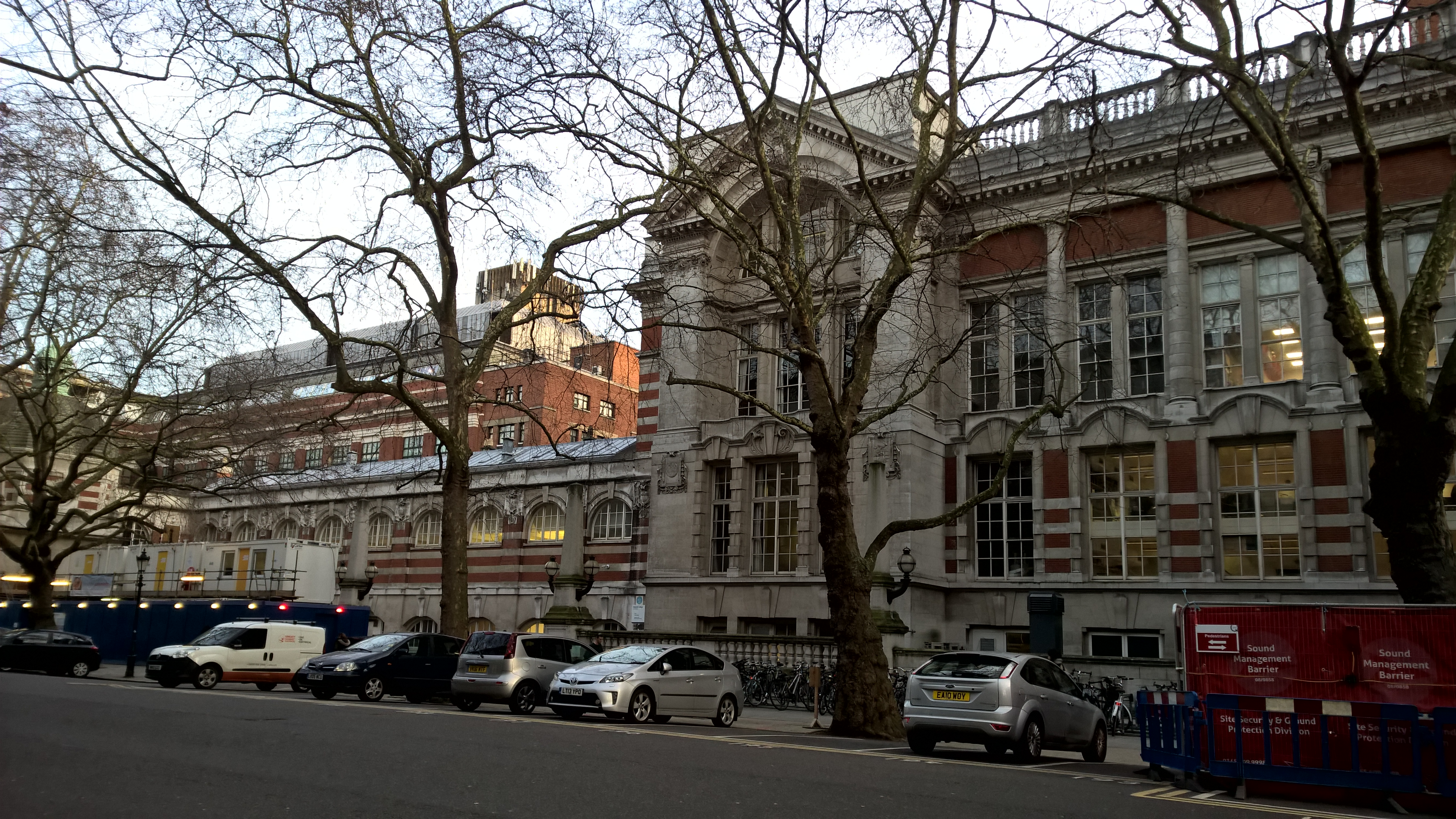
- Surviving fragment of the former Royal College of Science building
- Former name: Royal College of Science
- Established: 2005
- Dean: Professor Richard Craster
- Location: London, United Kingdom
- Campus: South Kensington, White City and Silwood Park
Colours
- Website: www.imperial.ac.uk/natural-sciences

The Faculty of Natural Sciences is one of four faculties of Imperial College London in London, England. It was formed in 2001 from the former Royal College of Science, a constituent college of Imperial College which dated back to 1848, and the faculty largely consists of the original departments of the college. Undergraduate teaching occurs for all departments at the South Kensington campus, with research being split between South Kensington and the new innovation campus at White City.

Students who study at the departments of the Faculty are represented by the Royal College of Science Union, a constituent union of the college union which caters specifically to students on natural science courses. Graduates who obtain an undergraduate degree, either BSc or MSci, from the faculty are awarded the Associateship of the Royal College of Science (ARCS) as an additional degree.

== History ==
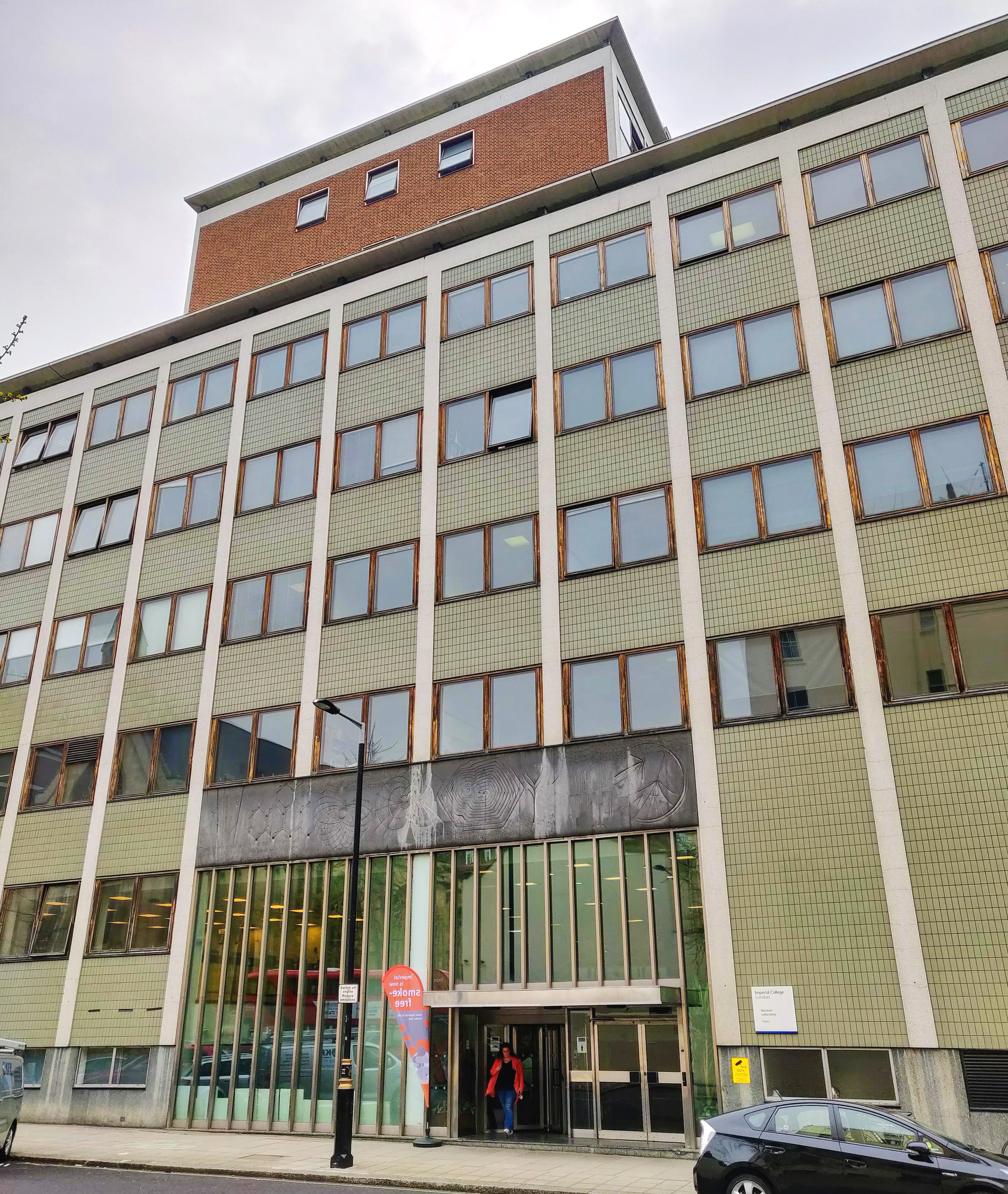
The Blackett Laboratory is home to the Department of Physics

The origins of the faculty lie in the Royal College of Chemistry, which, after being founded in 1845, moved to a new site in South Kensington in the early 1870s. Incorporated into the Normal School of Science, the college was later renamed the Royal College of Science in 1890, and in 1907 became a constituent college of the newly formed Imperial College of Science and Technology.

In 2001, Imperial was restructured to form four new faculties, including the faculties of Physical Sciences and Life Sciences, which took over the role of the Royal College of Science. These faculties were later re-merged over the course of 2005-2006 to form the Faculty of Natural Sciences, which comprises the same departments as the original Royal College of Science.

== Departments ==
The faculty includes five academic departments:

- Chemistry
- Mathematics
- Physics, The Blackett Laboratory
- Life Sciences
- Centre for Environmental Policy
