= Global Alliance of Technological Universities =

- Formation: 2009
- Type: Educational
- Headquarters: Munich, Germany
- Website: globaltechalliance.org

The Global Alliance of Technological Universities is a network of seven technological universities. It was founded in 2009.

== Members ==
- Carnegie Mellon University (United States of America)
- Imperial College London (United Kingdom)
- Indian Institute of Technology Bombay (India)
- Nanyang Technological University (Singapore)
- Shanghai Jiao Tong University (People's Republic of China)
- Technical University of Munich (Germany)
- University of New South Wales (Australia)
