= El Salvador Project =

The El Salvador Reconstruction and Development Project is a charitable volunteer project from Imperial College London's Department of Civil and Environmental Engineering which was launched in reaction to two major earthquakes that struck the country of El Salvador in 2001. The project has a voluntary student membership basis and is concentrated in rural, mainly underdeveloped areas of the country.

Team leadership and student involvement interchange on an annual basis with the start of a new academic year. The project is supported by a board of Alumni members.

== History ==
As a result of the large magnitude earthquakes that killed at least 844 people, students from Imperial College London's Civil Engineering Department volunteered to work on a development project from 2002 onwards, to be concentrated in the country's poorest communities over subsequent academic years.

Students from several universities and disciplines have travelled along to El Salvador and worked with the relevant community for 5 to 7 weeks on various development projects. The typical student intake over a particular year varies between 11-13.

Communities helped by the El Salvador Project: Estanzuelas, Usulután (2002), San Emigdio, La Paz (2003, 2004, 2005), Santa Marta, San Vicente (2006, 2007), Colima, Cuscatlán (2009)

== Finance ==
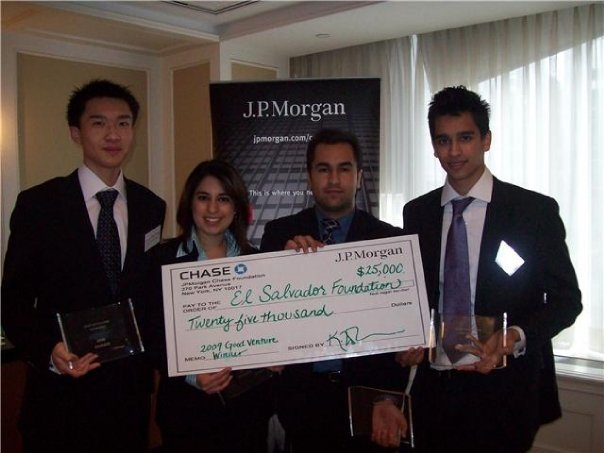
Winners of the JP Morgan Global Good Venture Competition 2009 in New York City: Adam Yang, Feroza Kassam, Raz Jabary, Mohammad Mahbub (l-r).

The project receives most of its finance from company sponsors. From the appointment of a particular year's members to the end of the relevant academic year the student body is further involved in fundraising events, which in the past has included evening sales and a marathon style run in the Netherlands. On 17 April 2009 the project competed in the JP Morgan Good Venture Case competition in New York City, where it won $25,000 to fund its activities.

On 2 December 2009 the project secured a further $15,000 from JP Morgan's online global Give-it-Away competition.

== 2009 Project ==
This year's project was based in the community of Colima in the Department of Cuscatlán. Two reinforced earthquake resistant houses were constructed, in addition to a retaining wall. The design of the houses was presented by the Reconstruction and Development Organization of El Salvador (REDES), a national NGO which works closely with the project and oversees the construction process.

== Future activities ==
In association with the British Geological Survey seismologists from among others the Department of Civil Engineering of Imperial College London predict an increasing risk posed by earthquakes in El Salvador in the near future due to rapid population expansion exacerbated by deforestation.

In reaction to the floods and landslides in November 2009 that left at least 192 people dead, REDES will likely be appointing a specifically badly struck geographical entity for consideration under the 2010 project.

Plans for future improvement that are currently awaiting approval include the expansion of a particular year's activities to cover more than one community, spreading out the construction work by sending over teams outside the summer term period and expansion of the concept of the project to cover communities in the neighbouring countries of Guatemala and Honduras.

== 2014 Project ==
The 2014 project will involve the project team travelling to Guatemala for the first time. A house design developed in conjunction with Arup will be tested on an earthquake simulator at the University Mariano Galvez in Guatemala City. The team will then construct a second house within a community in El Salvador.
