= Imperial College Innovations =

British technology company

Imperial Innovations
- Formerly: Imperial College Enterprises Limited
- Industry: technology commercialisation investment company
- Founded: 1986
- Headquarters: London
- Website: www.imperialinnovations.co.uk

Imperial College Innovations Ltd is a UK technology commercialisation and investment company, based in London. Imperial Innovations is traded on the Alternative Investment Market of the London Stock Exchange.

== History ==
Imperial Innovations was founded in 1986 as a department of Imperial College London, later becoming a wholly owned subsidiary of the college. The company was originally known as IMPEL, short for Imperial College Enterprises Limited.

In July 2006, shares in the company were admitted to trading on the Alternative Investment Market of the London Stock Exchange. Since 2006, Imperial Innovations has raised over £300 million to invest in early-stage technology businesses.

On 4 November 2010 Prime Minister David Cameron revealed in a speech given in East London that Imperial Innovations had agreed to advise on the creation of an accelerator space for spinout companies at the Queen Elizabeth Olympic Park as part of the new East London Tech City hub.

One notable tech spinout is London-based Breathe Battery Technologies, launched in 2019. In March 2024, Volvo Cars announced its partnership with Breathe would greatly improve charging times in its future EVs.
