= Imperial College London =

Public university in England

- Coat of arms
- Motto: Scientia, imperii decus et tutamen (Latin)
- Motto in English: Scientific knowledge, the crowning glory and the safeguard of the empire
- Type: Public research university
- Established: 8 July 1907; 119 years ago
- Affiliations: ACU; EUA; Global Alliance of Technological Universities; LERU; Russell Group; SES; Universities UK
- Endowment: £272.4 million (2025)
- Budget: £1.474 billion (2024/25)
- President: Hugh Brady
- Provost: Ian Walmsley
- Academic staff: 4,730 (2024/25)
- Administrative staff: 4,620 (2024/25)
- Students: 22,525 (2024/25); 21,310 FTE (2024/25)
- Undergraduates: 12,080 (2024/25)
- Postgraduates: 10,440 (2024/25)
- Location: London, England
Scarf
- Newspaper: Felix
- Colours: Blue
- Website: imperial.ac.uk
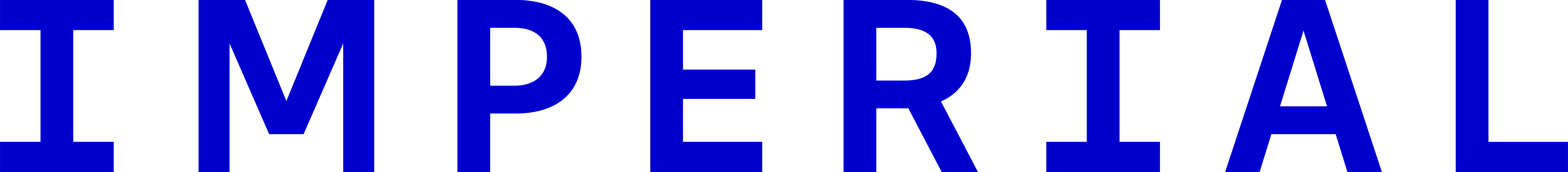

The Imperial College of Science, Technology and Medicine, known by its trade names Imperial College London and Imperial, is a public research university in London, England. Its history began with Prince Albert, husband of Queen Victoria, who envisioned South Kensington as a cultural district with museums, colleges, and the Royal Albert Hall. In 1907, two colleges – the Royal College of Science and the Royal School of Mines – merged to form Imperial College London, with City and Guilds College joining in 1910.

In 1988, Imperial merged with St Mary's Hospital Medical School and then with Charing Cross and Westminster Medical School to form the Imperial College School of Medicine. The Imperial Business School was established in 2003 and was officially opened by Queen Elizabeth II. Formerly a constituent college of the University of London, Imperial became an independent university in 2007.

Imperial is organised into four faculties: engineering, medicine, natural sciences, and business. The university encourages innovation and enterprise across all its faculties by integrating business courses into science degrees and providing business students with a scientific education. The main campus is located in South Kensington with additional campuses in White City and other locations near South Kensington. The faculty of medicine also operates five teaching hospitals across London as well as the Pears Cumbria School of Medicine based in Carlisle in co-operation with the University of Cumbria.

Its graduates and academics include 14 Nobel Prize winners, three Fields Medal winners, 74 fellows of the Royal Society and 84 fellows of the Royal Academy of Engineering.

== History ==
=== 19th century ===
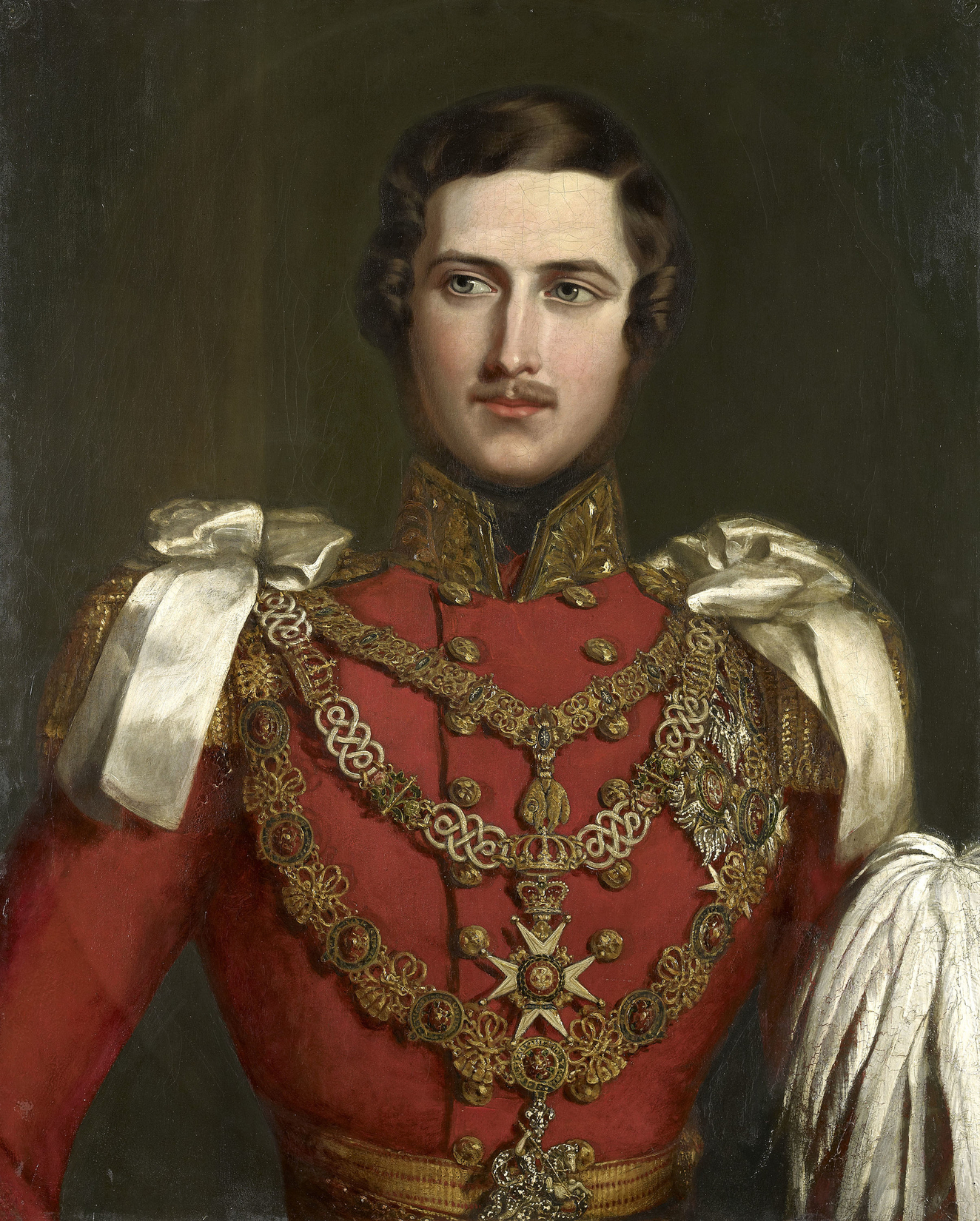
Prince Albert was the main patron of the early royal colleges and the development of an area of culture in South Kensington

The earliest college that led to the formation of Imperial was the Royal College of Chemistry, founded in 1845, with the support of Prince Albert and parliament. This was merged in 1853 into what became known as the Royal School of Mines. The medical school has roots in many different schools across London, the oldest of which being Charing Cross Hospital Medical School which can be traced back to 1823, followed by teaching starting at Westminster Hospital in 1834, and St Mary's Hospital in 1851.

In 1851, the Great Exhibition was organised as an exhibition of culture and industry by Henry Cole and by Prince Albert, husband of the reigning monarch of the United Kingdom, Queen Victoria. An enormously popular and financial success, proceeds from the Great Exhibition were designated to develop an area for cultural and scientific advancement in South Kensington. Within the next six years the Victoria and Albert Museum and Science Museum had opened, joined by new facilities in 1871 for the Royal College of Chemistry, and in 1881 the opening of the Royal School of Mines and Natural History Museum.

In 1881, the Normal School of Science was established in South Kensington under the leadership of Thomas Huxley, taking over responsibility for the teaching of the natural sciences and agriculture from the Royal School of Mines. The school was renamed the Royal College of Science by royal consent in 1890. The Central Institution of the City and Guilds of London Institute was opened as a technical education school on Exhibition Road by the Prince of Wales in 1884, with courses beginning in 1885.

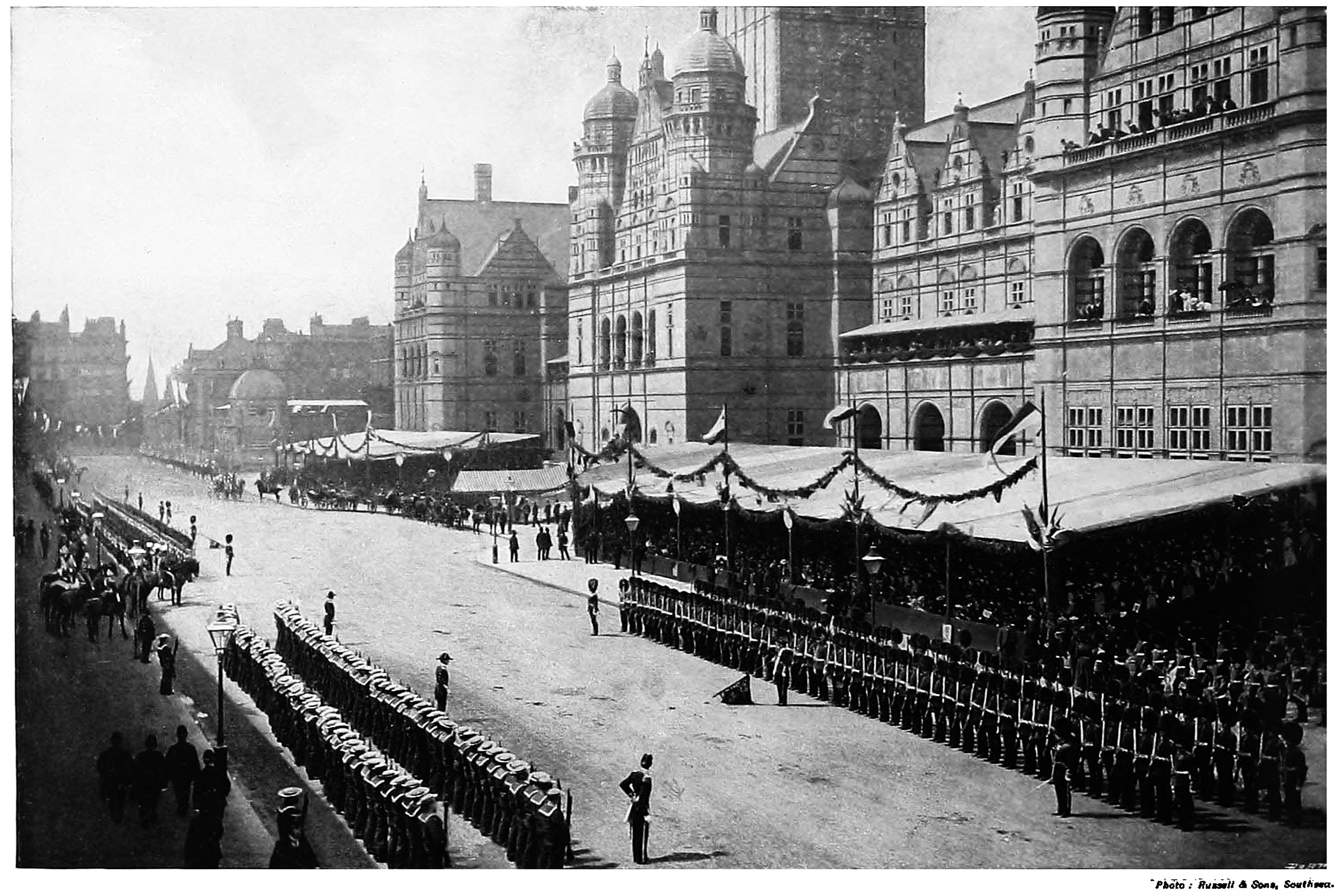
The Imperial Institute, founded for Queen Victoria's Golden Jubilee, was home to the university until 1937. It became the Queen's Tower to make room for the college's expansion.

=== 20th century ===
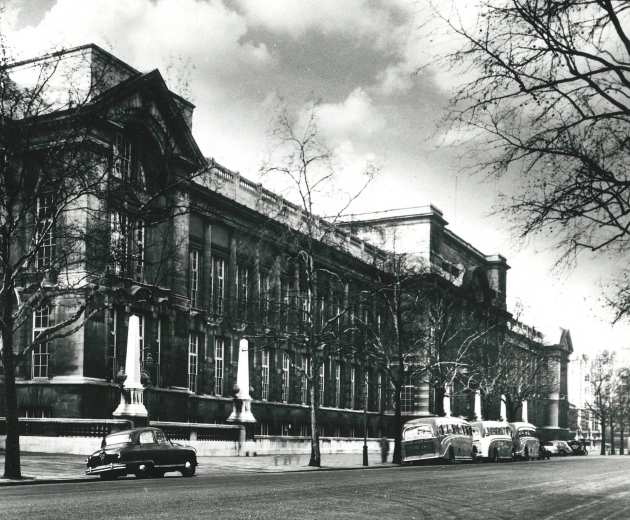
Royal College of Science

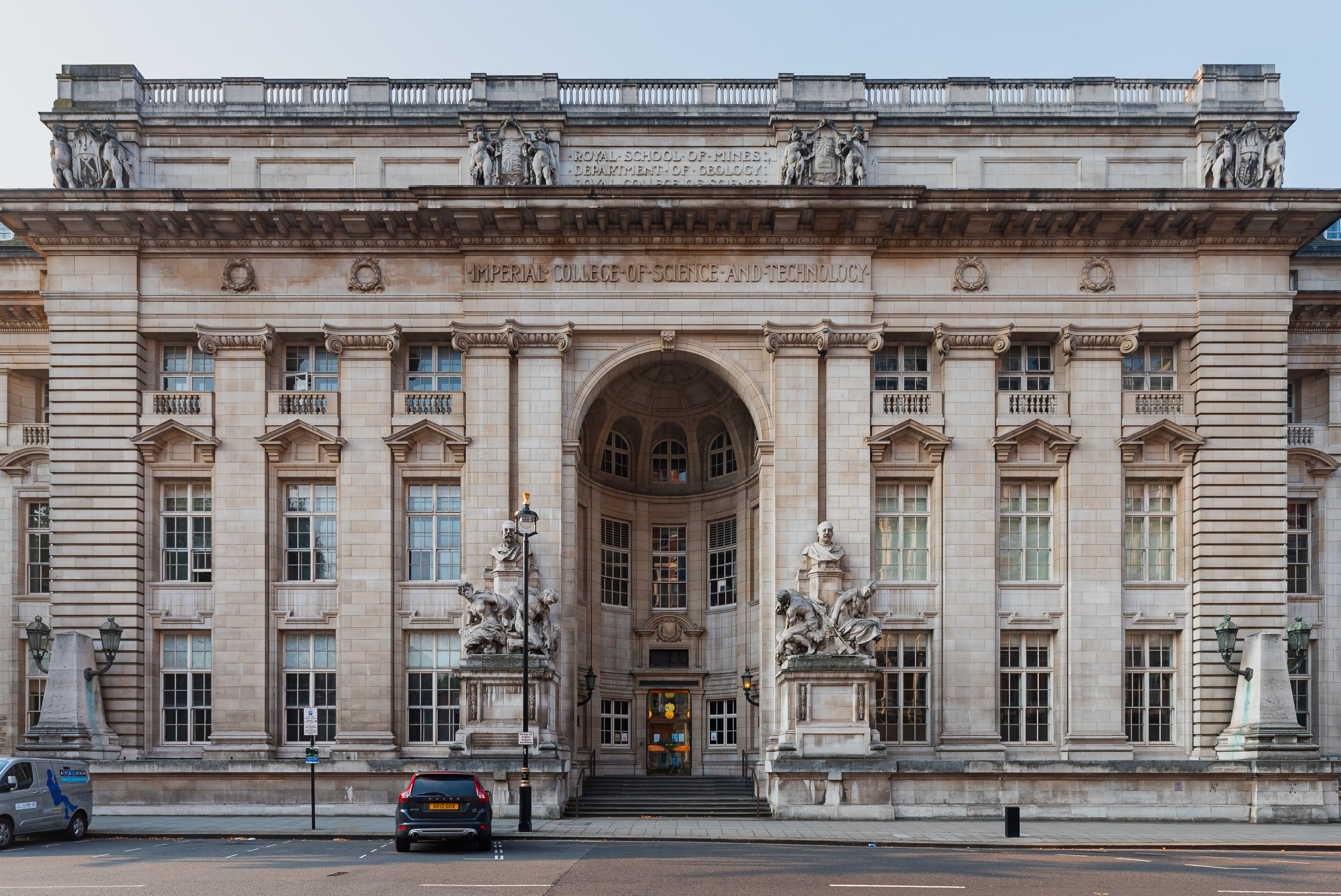
Royal School of Mines

At the start of the 20th century, there was a concern that Great Britain was falling behind Germany in scientific and technical education. A departmental committee was set up at the Board of Education in 1904, to look into the future of the Royal College of Science. A report released in 1906 called for the establishment of an institution unifying the Royal College of Science and the Royal School of Mines, as well as – if an agreement could be reached with the City and Guilds of London Institute – its Central Technical College. On 8 July 1907, Edward VII granted a Royal Charter establishing the Imperial College of Science and Technology. This incorporated the Royal School of Mines and the Royal College of Science. It also made provisions for the City and Guilds College to join once conditions regarding its governance were met, as well as for Imperial to become a college of the University of London. The college joined the University of London on 22 July 1908, with the City and Guilds College joining in 1910. The main campus of Imperial College was constructed beside the buildings of the Imperial Institute, the new building for the Royal College of Science having opened across from it in 1906, and the foundation stone for the Royal School of Mines building being laid by King Edward VII in July 1909.

As students at Imperial had to study separately for London degrees, in January 1919, students and alumni voted for a petition to make Imperial a university with its own degree awarding powers, independent of the University of London. In response, the University of London changed its regulations in 1925 so that the courses taught only at Imperial would be examined by the university, enabling students to gain a Bachelor of Science. In October 1945, George VI and Queen Elizabeth visited Imperial to commemorate the centenary of the Royal College of Chemistry, which was the oldest of the institutions that united to form Imperial College. "Commemoration Day", named after this visit, is held every October as the university's main graduation ceremony. The college also acquired a biology field station at Silwood Park near Ascot, Berkshire in 1947

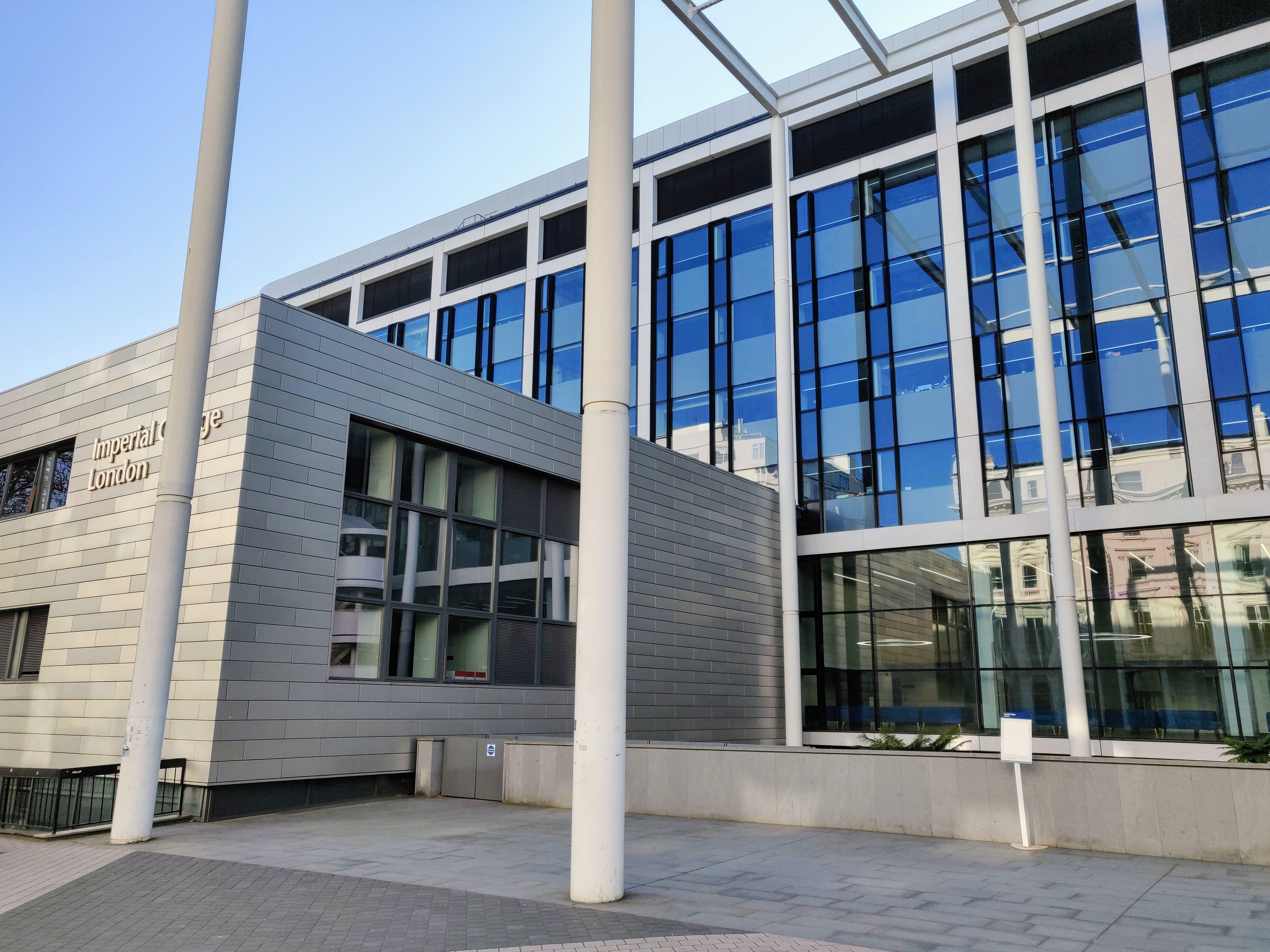
The City & Guilds Building

Following World War II, there was again concern that Britain was falling behind in science – this time to the United States. The Percy Report of 1945 and Barlow Committee in 1946 called for a "British MIT"-equivalent, backed by influential scientists as politicians of the time, including Lord Cherwell, Sir Lawrence Bragg and Sir Edward Appleton. The University Grants Committee strongly opposed however, and so a compromise was reached in 1953, where Imperial would remain within the university but double in size over the following ten years. The expansion led to a number of new buildings being erected. These included the Hill building in 1957 and the Physics building in 1960, and the completion of the East Quadrangle, built in four stages between 1959 and 1965. The building work also meant the demolition of the City and Guilds College building in 1962–63, and the Imperial Institute's building by 1967. Opposition from the Royal Fine Arts Commission and others meant that Queen's Tower was retained, with work carried out between 1966 and 1968 to make it free standing. New laboratories for biochemistry, established with the support of a £350,000 grant from the Wolfson Foundation, were opened by the Queen in 1965.

In 1988, Imperial merged with St Mary's Hospital Medical School under the Imperial College Act 1988. Amendments to the royal charter changed the formal name of the institution to The Imperial College of Science, Technology and Medicine and made St Mary's a constituent college. This was followed by mergers with the National Heart and Lung Institute in 1995 and the Charing Cross and Westminster Medical School, Royal Postgraduate Medical School and the Institute of Obstetrics and Gynaecology in 1997, with the Imperial College Act 1997 formally establishing the Imperial College School of Medicine.

=== 21st century ===
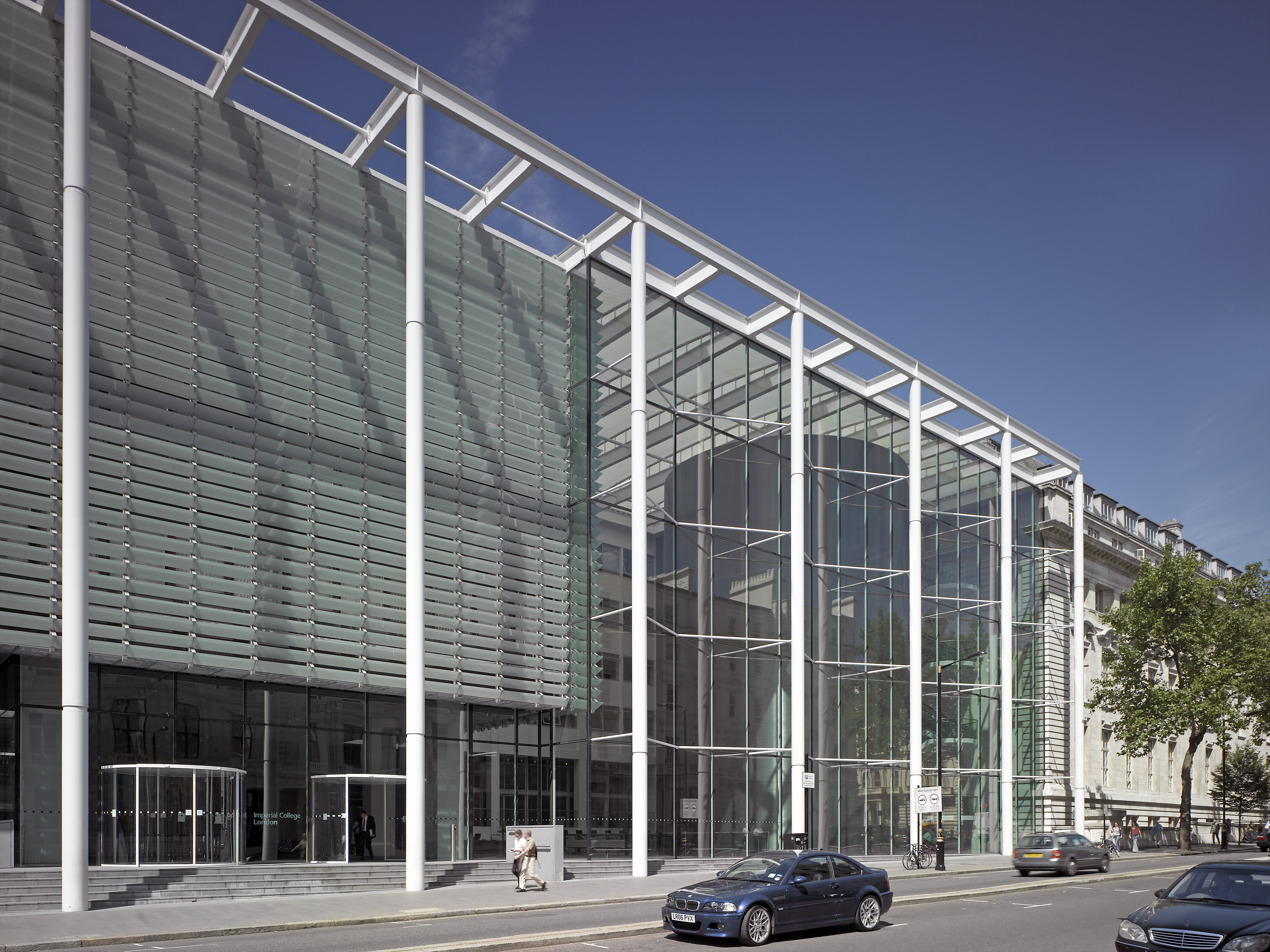
Imperial College London Business School

In 2003, Imperial was granted degree-awarding powers in its own right by the Privy Council. In 2004, the Imperial Business School and a new main college entrance on Exhibition Road were opened. The UK Energy Research Centre was also established in 2004 and opened its headquarters at Imperial. On 9 December 2005, Imperial announced that it would commence negotiations to secede from the University of London. Imperial became fully independent of the University of London in July 2007.

In April 2011, Imperial and King's College London joined the UK Centre for Medical Research and Innovation as partners with a commitment of £40 million each to the project. The centre was later renamed the Francis Crick Institute and opened on 9 November 2016. It is the largest single biomedical laboratory in Europe. The college began moving into the new White City campus in 2016, with the launching of the Innovation Hub. This was followed by the opening of the Molecular Sciences Research Hub for the Department of Chemistry, officially opened by Mayor of London, Sadiq Khan in 2019.

In 2014, Stefan Grimm, of the Department of Medicine, was found dead after being told that he was "struggling to fulfil the metrics" of his professorial post. The college announced an internal inquiry into his death and found that the performance metrics for his position were unreasonable, but new metrics would be needed to replace them.

== Campuses ==
=== South Kensington ===
The South Kensington campus is the college's main campus, where most teaching and research takes place. It is home to many notable buildings, such as the Business School, Royal School of Mines, and Royal College of Science. It is also the original site of the Imperial Institute, whose Queen's Tower stands at the heart of the campus overlooking Queen's Lawn. As part of a cultural centre known as Albertopolis the campus is surrounded by many of London's most popular attractions, including the Royal Albert Hall and Kensington Palace, museums including the Natural History Museum, Science Museum, and Victoria and Albert Museum, and institutions such as the Royal College of Art, the Royal College of Music, and the National Art Library.

The campus has many restaurants and cafés run by the college, and contains much of the college's student accommodation, including the Prince's Garden Halls, and Beit Hall, home to the college union, which runs student pubs, a nightclub, and a cinema on site. To the north, within easy walking distance of the college, are Kensington Gardens and Hyde Park, with green spaces and sports facilities used by many of the student clubs.

=== White City ===
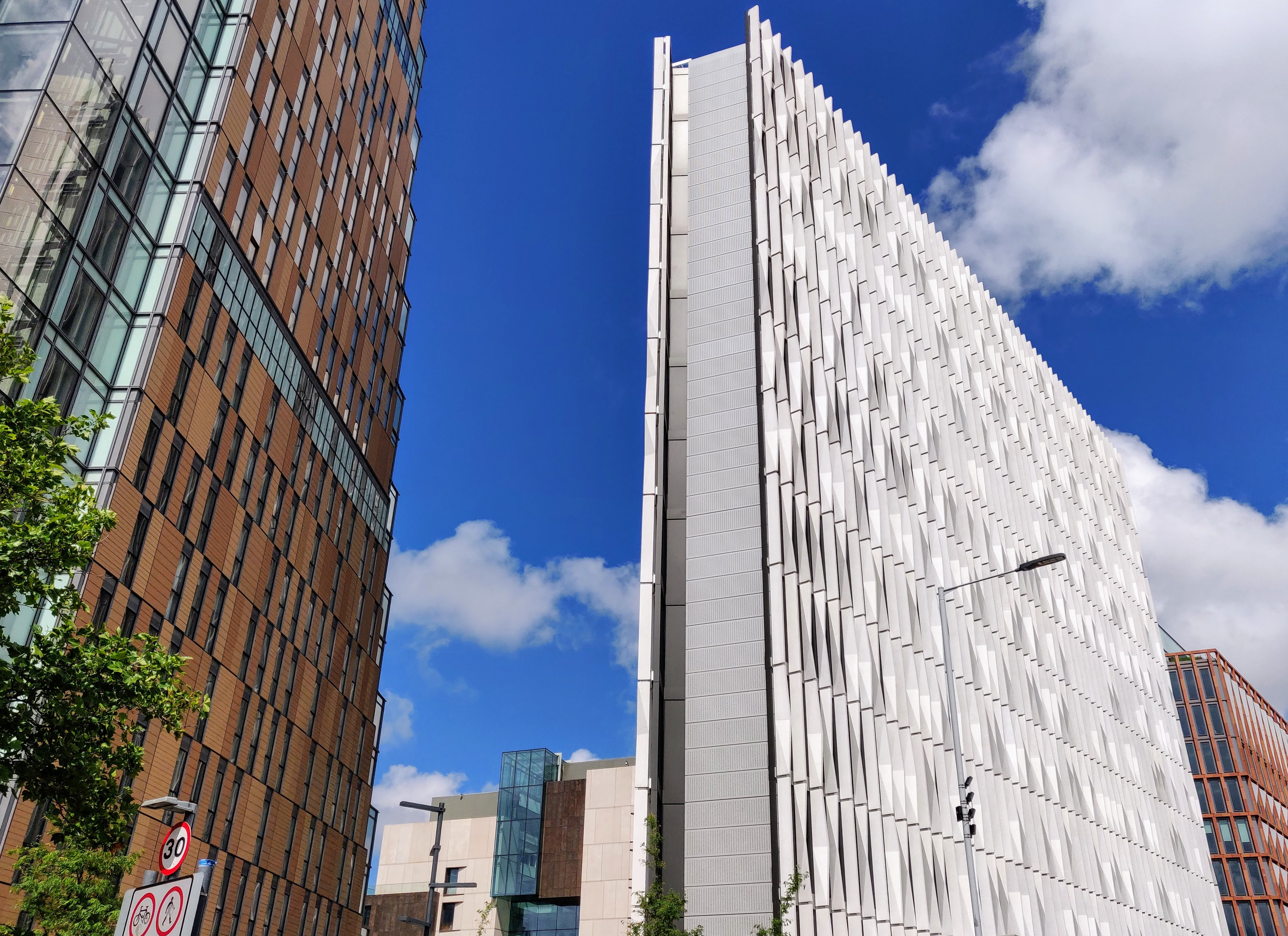
Sir Michael Uren Biomedical Engineering Research Hub at White City

Imperial has a new second major campus in White City providing a platform for innovation and entrepreneurship. This campus was built on land previously owned by BBC.

The hub houses research facilities, postgraduate accommodation, as well as a commercialisation space called I-HUB. This houses the London hub of the British government’s Defence and Security Accelerator and a United States Air Force, Army and Navy joint international research office. Saab and Airbus also have a presence on the campus.

The campus is home to the Scale Space and incubator, Invention Rooms, a college hackerspace and community outreach centre.

The White City campus also includes a biomedical centre funded by a donation from alumnus Sir Michael Uren.

Imperial revealed plans in 2025 to build an AI campus at White City, centred on a new 12-storey building designed by Allies and Morrison, to be constructed between 2028 and 2029.

=== Silwood Park ===
Silwood Park is a postgraduate campus of Imperial in the village of Sunninghill near Ascot in Berkshire. The Silwood Park campus remains a centre for research and teaching in ecology, evolution, and conservation. It is set in 100 hectares of parkland used for ecological field experiments.

=== Hospitals ===
Imperial has teaching hospitals across London which are used by the School of Medicine for undergraduate clinical teaching and medical research. All are based around college-affiliated hospitals, and also provide catering and sport facilities. College libraries are located on each campus, including the Fleming library at St Mary's.

=== Student housing ===
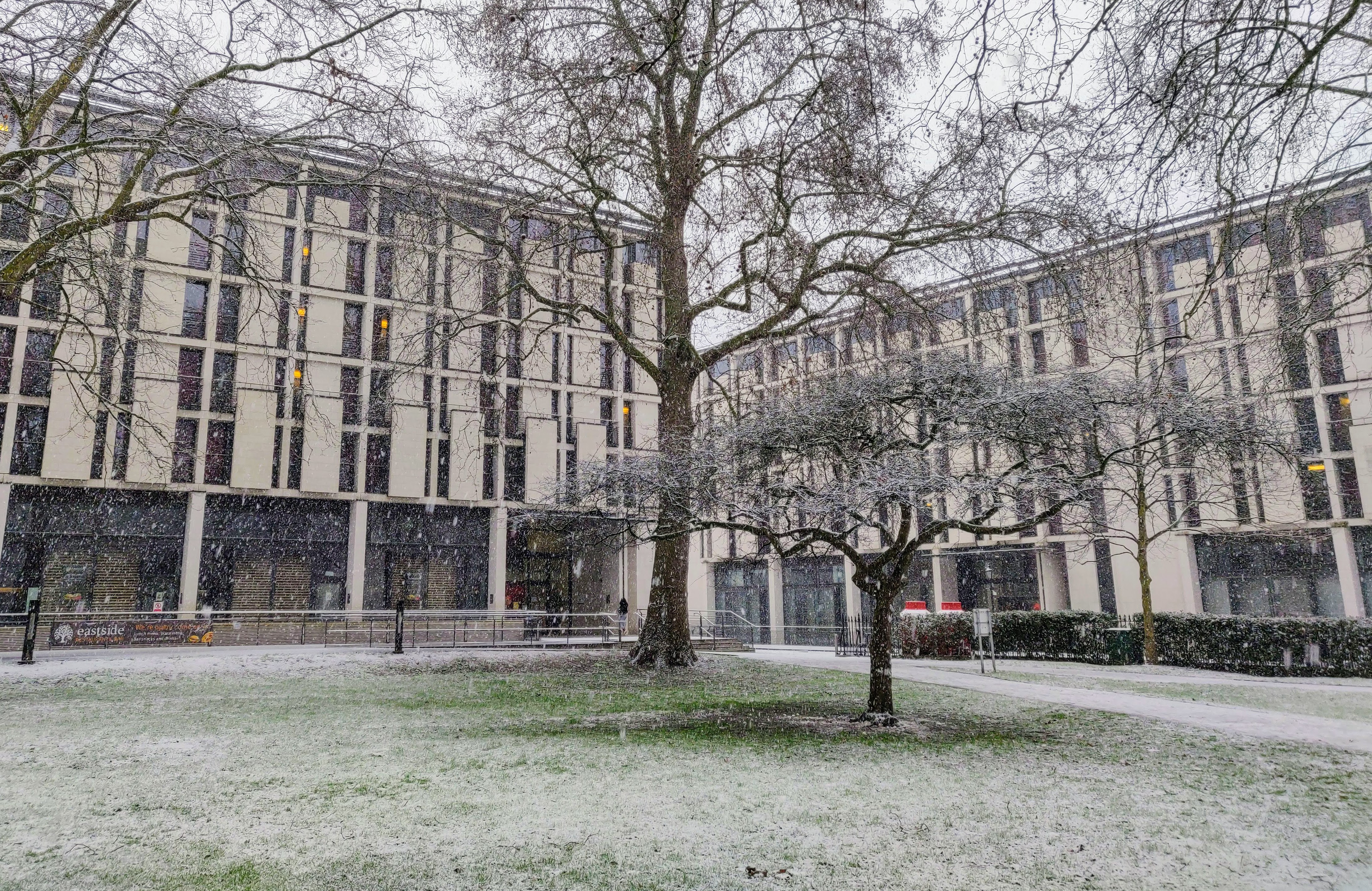
Prince's Gardens surrounded by college halls of residence

Imperial College owns and manages ten halls of residence in Inner London, Acton and Ascot, Berkshire. Over three thousand rooms are available, with first year undergraduates guaranteed a place in one of the six main college residences (subject to certain requirements). The majority of halls offer single or twin accommodation with some rooms having en suite facilities. Bedrooms are provided with basic furniture and with access to shared kitchens and bathrooms. All rooms come with internet access and access to the Imperial network.

Most students in college or university accommodation are first-year undergraduates. The majority of older students and postgraduates find accommodation in the private sector, help for which is provided by the college private housing office. However a handful of students may continue to live in halls in later years if they take the position of a "hall senior", and places are available for a small number of returning students in three small halls. The accommodation in Ascot is only for postgraduate students based at the Silwood Park site.

== Organisation and administration ==
=== Faculties and departments ===
Imperial is organised into four faculties: the Faculty of Engineering, the Faculty of Medicine, the Faculty of Natural Sciences, and the Imperial Business School. As of 2024, the academic departments are:

Faculty of Engineering

- Aeronautics
- Bioengineering
- Chemical Engineering
- Civil and Environmental Engineering
- Computing
- Dyson School of Design Engineering
- Earth Science and Engineering
- Electrical and Electronic Engineering
- Materials
- Mechanical Engineering

Faculty of Medicine

- Brain Sciences
- Immunology and Inflammation
- Infectious Disease
- Institute of Clinical Sciences
- Metabolism, Digestion and Reproduction
- Surgery and Cancer
- Institute of Clinical Sciences
- National Heart and Lung Institute
- School of Public Health

Faculty of Natural Sciences

- Chemistry
- Mathematics
- Physics
- Life Sciences
- Centre for Environmental Policy

Imperial Business School

- Analytics and Operations
- Economics and Public Policy
- Finance
- Management and Entrepreneurship
- Marketing

=== Interdisciplinary centres ===
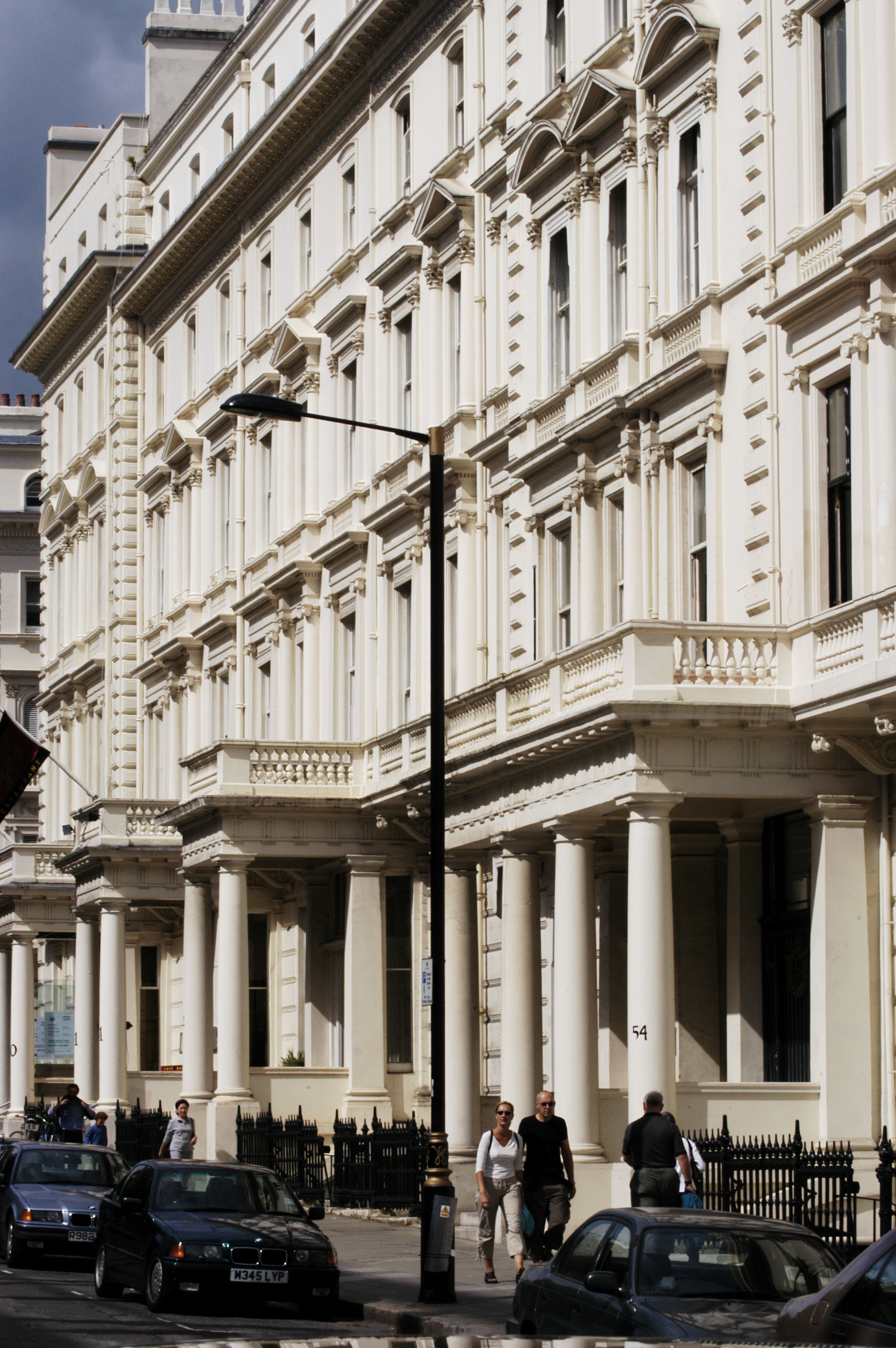
Brevan Howard Centre for Financial Analysis

Imperial hosts centres to promote inter-disciplinary work under the titles of Global Challenge institutes, Imperial Centres of Excellence and Imperial Networks of Excellence. It also participates as a partner in a number of national institutes.

Global Challenge institutes:

- Data Science Institute
- Energy Futures Laboratory
- Grantham Institute for Climate Change
- Institute for Molecular Science and Engineering
- Institute for Security Science and Technology
- Institute of Global Health Innovation
- Institute of Infection

National institutes:

- Francis Crick Institute
- Rosalind Franklin Institute
- Alan Turing Institute
- Henry Royce Institute
- Faraday Institution
- UK Dementia Research Institute
- MRC Laboratory of Medical Sciences

=== Academic centres ===
The Centre for Languages, Culture and Communication operates as Imperial College London's adult education centre, offering evening class courses in the arts, humanities, languages and sciences. The university also houses two academic centres offering teaching to undergraduate and postgraduate students in subjects outside of science, technology and medicine. The academic centres are the:

- Centre for Academic English
- Centre for Languages, Culture and Communication

=== Governance ===
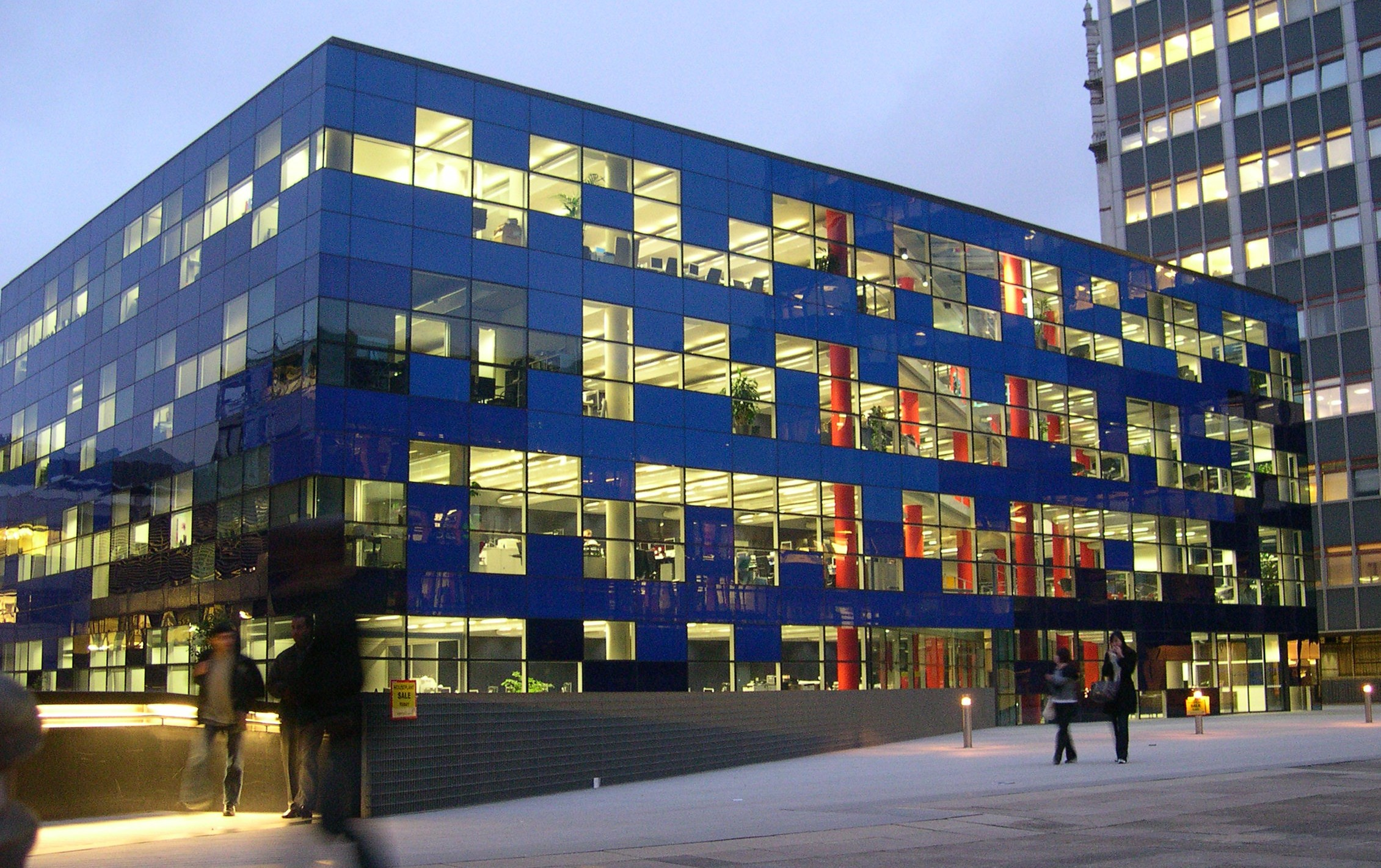
Faculty Building, designed by Norman Foster

The council is the governing body of Imperial. The council consists of between 19 and 27 members, with an independent chair and ex officio members being the president, the provost, the chief operating officer, the president of Imperial College Union, and four senior staff members. There are also up to four further staff members (comprising one member elected by the academic staff, one further appointed member of academic staff and two members of the professional services staff), up to one further representative of Imperial College Union, and between nine and 13 other independent members, with the proviso that the independent members (including the chair) must comprise the majority. The president is the highest academic official and chief executive of Imperial College London. The position has been held by Hugh Brady, since August 2022. As of 2024, the provost is Ian Walmsley and the chair is Vindi Banga.

=== Finances and endowment ===
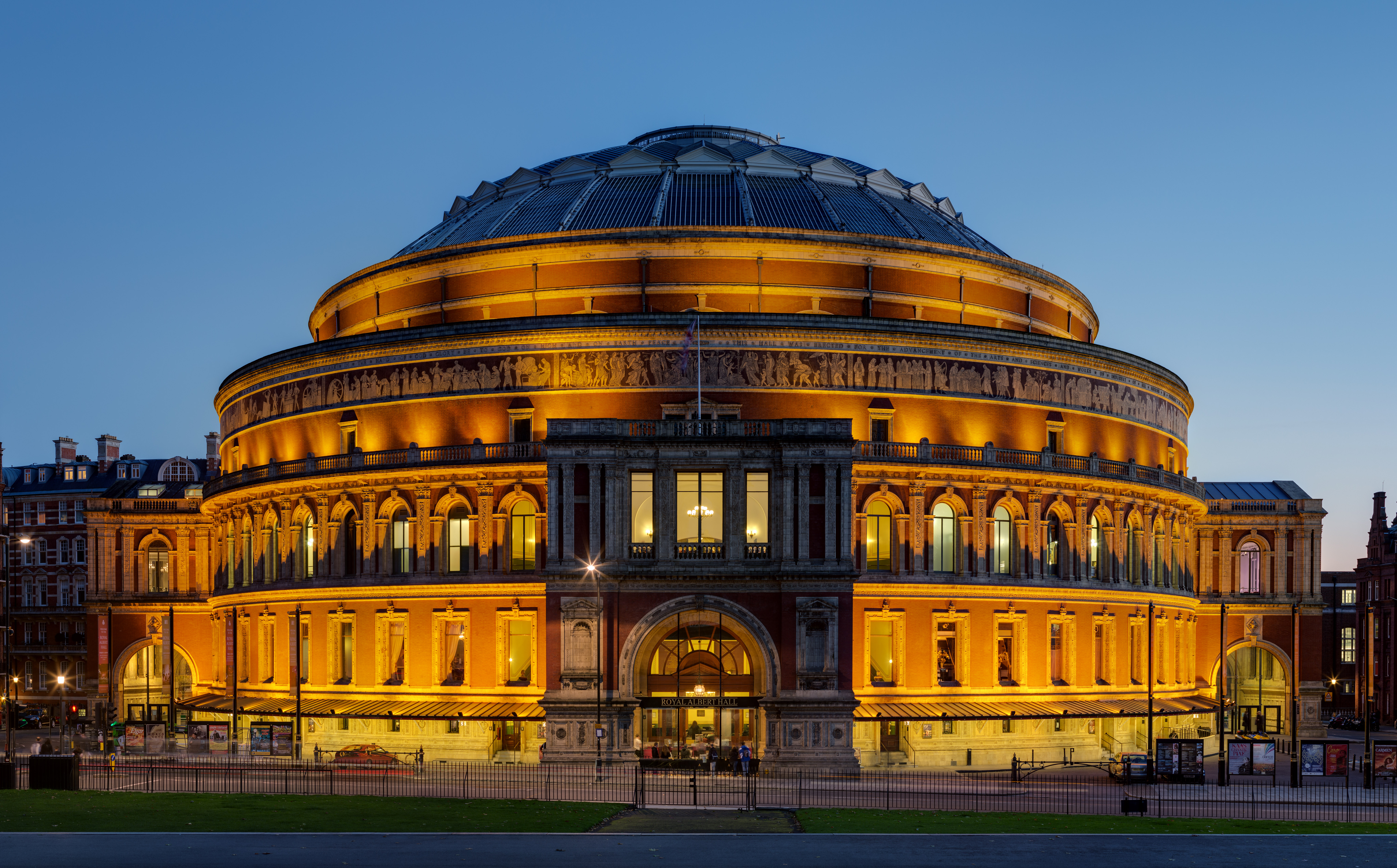
Graduation ceremonies take place in the Royal Albert Hall

The college's endowment is sub-divided into three distinct portfolios:

- Unitised Scheme – a unit trust vehicle for the college, Faculties and Departments to invest endowments and unfettered income to produce returns for the long term
- Non-Core Property – a portfolio containing around 120 operational and developmental properties which the college has determined are not core to the academic mission
- Strategic Asset Investments – containing the college's shareholding in Imperial Innovations and other restricted equity holdings.

In the financial year ending 31 July 2024, Imperial had a total income of £1.309 billion (2022/23 – £1.256 billion) and total expenditure of £1.051 billion (2022/23 – £1.235 billion). Key sources of income included £507.5 million from tuition fees and education contracts (2022/23 – £452.1 million), £165.4 million from funding body grants (2022/23 – £183.3 million), £396.2 million from research grants and contracts (2022/23 – £383.1 million), £28.8 million from investment income (2022/23 – £24.1 million) and £35.5 million from donations and endowments (2022/23 – £51.5 million).

At year end, Imperial had endowments of £235.2 million (2022/23 – £220.1 million) and total net assets of £2.082 billion (2022/23 – £1.792 billion). It holds the eighth-largest endowment of any university in the UK.

=== Affiliations and partnerships ===
Imperial is a member of the Association of Commonwealth Universities, European University Association, Global Alliance of Technological Universities, League of European Research Universities and the Russell Group. It is a founding member of the Imperial College academic health sciences centre, the Francis Crick Institute and MedCity. Imperial is a long-term partner of the Massachusetts Institute of Technology, with the first formal large-scale collaboration agreement dating back to 1944 as part of World War II scientific effort. The partnership between the two institutions continues with exchange programs for students and academic staff.

== Academic profile ==
=== Research ===
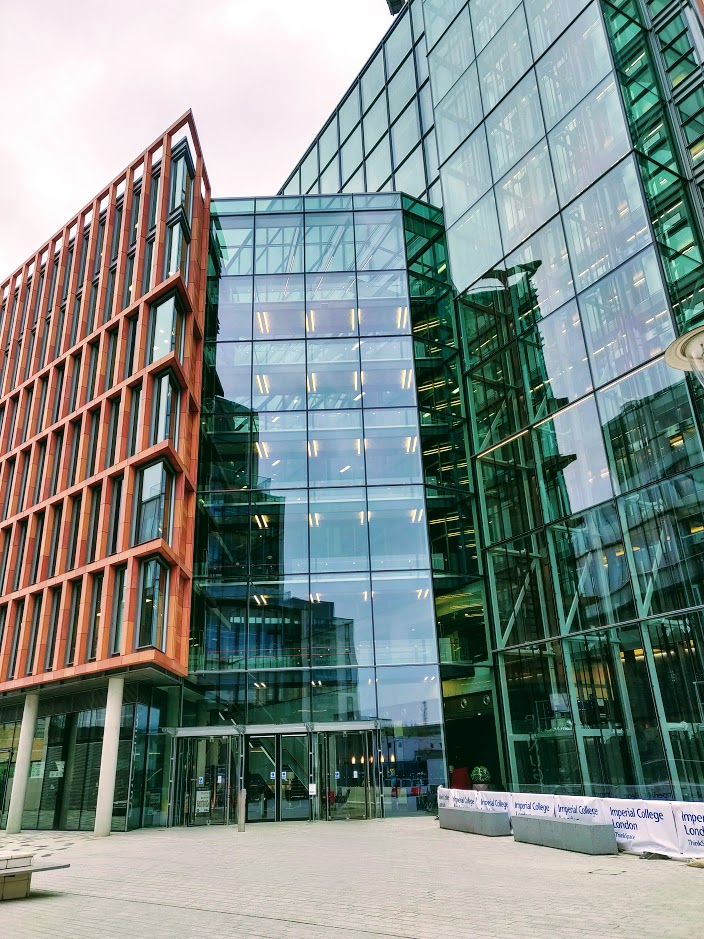
Innovation Hub

In the 2021 Research Excellence Framework, Imperial's research profile was assessed as 66 per cent world class (4*) 30 per cent internationally important (3*) and 3 per cent internationally recognised (2*), with insignificant quantities of research in lower categories. This led to Imperial being ranked first in the UK on GPA and ninth for research power by Times Higher Education, with a GPA of 3.63 and research power 47.3 per cent of the top-ranked University of Oxford.

The college promotes research commercialisation, partly through its dedicated technology transfer company, Imperial Innovations, which has given rise to a large number of spin-out companies based on academic research. Imperial researcher Narinder Singh Kapany made critical contributions to the invention of fibre optics.

The United States is the college's top foreign country for collaborations, and Imperial College has a long-term partnership with the Massachusetts Institute of Technology that dates from World War II.

In January 2018, the mathematics department of Imperial and the French National Centre for Scientific Research launched an "international joint research unit" (unité mixte internationale; UMI) at Imperial, known as UMI Abraham de Moivre after the French mathematician, focused on unsolved problems and bridging British and French scientific communities. In October 2018, Imperial College launched the Imperial Cancer Research UK Center, a research collaboration that aims to find innovative ways to improve the precision of cancer treatments, inaugurated by Joe Biden as part of his Biden Cancer Initiative.

Neil Ferguson's 16 March 2020 report entitled "Impact of non-pharmaceutical interventions to reduce COVID-19 mortality and healthcare demand" was described in a New York Times article as the coronavirus "report that jarred the U.S. and the U.K. to action". Since 18 May, Imperial College's Dr. Samir Bhatt advised the state of New York for its reopening plan. The governor of New York, Andrew Cuomo, said at the time that "the Imperial College model, as we've been following this for weeks, was the best, most accurate model."

=== Admissions ===
UCAS Admission Statistics
	2025	2024	2023	2022	2021
Applications (Note: Main scheme applications, International and UK)	33,350	32,990	30,725	28,620	28,700
Accepted	3,495	3,255	3,135	3,090	3,305
Applications/Accepted Ratio	9.5	10.1	9.8	9.3	8.7
Overall Offer Rate (%)	25.3	25.2	25.8	26.2	27.2
↳ UK only (%) (Note: UK domiciled applicants)	32.1	32.7	33.0	30.1	32.4
Average Entry Tariff	—N/a	—N/a	205	202	206
↳ Top three exams (Note: The maximum tariff score for three exams is 168: the equivalent of A*A*A* at A-Level, 777 at HL for the IB Diploma Programme, or AAA at Advanced Higher)	—N/a	—N/a	163.4	164.2	164.4

HESA Student Body Composition (2024/25)
Domicile and Ethnicity	Total
British White (Note: Not be confused solely with White British)	19%
British Ethnic Minorities (Note: Includes those who indicate that they identify as Asian, Black, Mixed Heritage, Arab or any other ethnicity except White.)	28%
International EU	9%
International Non-EU	44%
Undergraduate Widening Participation Indicators
Female	39%
Independent School	31%
Low Participation Areas (Note: Calculated from the Polar4 measure, using Quintile1, in England and Wales. Calculated from the Scottish Index of Multiple Deprivation (SIMD) measure, using SIMD20, in Scotland.)	7%

In the 2024/25 academic year, the student body consisted of 22,525 students, composed of 12,080 undergraduates and 10,440 postgraduate students. The university is consistently designated as a 'high-tariff' institution by the Department for Education, with the average undergraduate entrant to the university in recent years amassing between 163–165 UCAS Tariff points in their top three pre-university qualifications – the equivalent of A*A*A to A*A*A* at A-Level. Based on 2022/23 HESA entry standards data published in domestic league tables, which include a broad range of qualifications beyond the top three exam grades, the average student at Imperial College London achieved 202 points – the sixth highest in the country.

In the academic year 2021/22, the ratio of applicants to admissions was 9:1 for undergraduates and 7.7:1 for postgraduates. The university gave offers of admission to 30.1% of its undergraduate applicants in 2022, the 7th lowest offer rate across the country. The undergraduate courses with the highest ratios of applicants to admissions were computing (19.2:1), mathematics (14.6:1) and mechanical engineering (11.2:1). The postgraduate courses with the highest ratios of applicants to admissions were computing (21:1), mathematics (17.9:1), and electrical engineering (14:1).

36.5% of Imperial's undergraduates are privately educated, the fourth highest proportion amongst mainstream British universities. Imperial is among the most international universities in the United Kingdom, and was ranked the fourth most international university in the world (and the highest outside of Hong Kong) in 2026, with more than 60% of students from outside the UK.

=== Libraries ===
The college's main library is located next to Queen's Lawn and contains the main corpus of the college's collection. It previously also housed the Science Museum's library until 2014. The Fleming library is located at St Mary's in Paddington, originally the library of St Mary's Hospital Medical School, with other hospital campuses also having college libraries.

=== Medicine ===
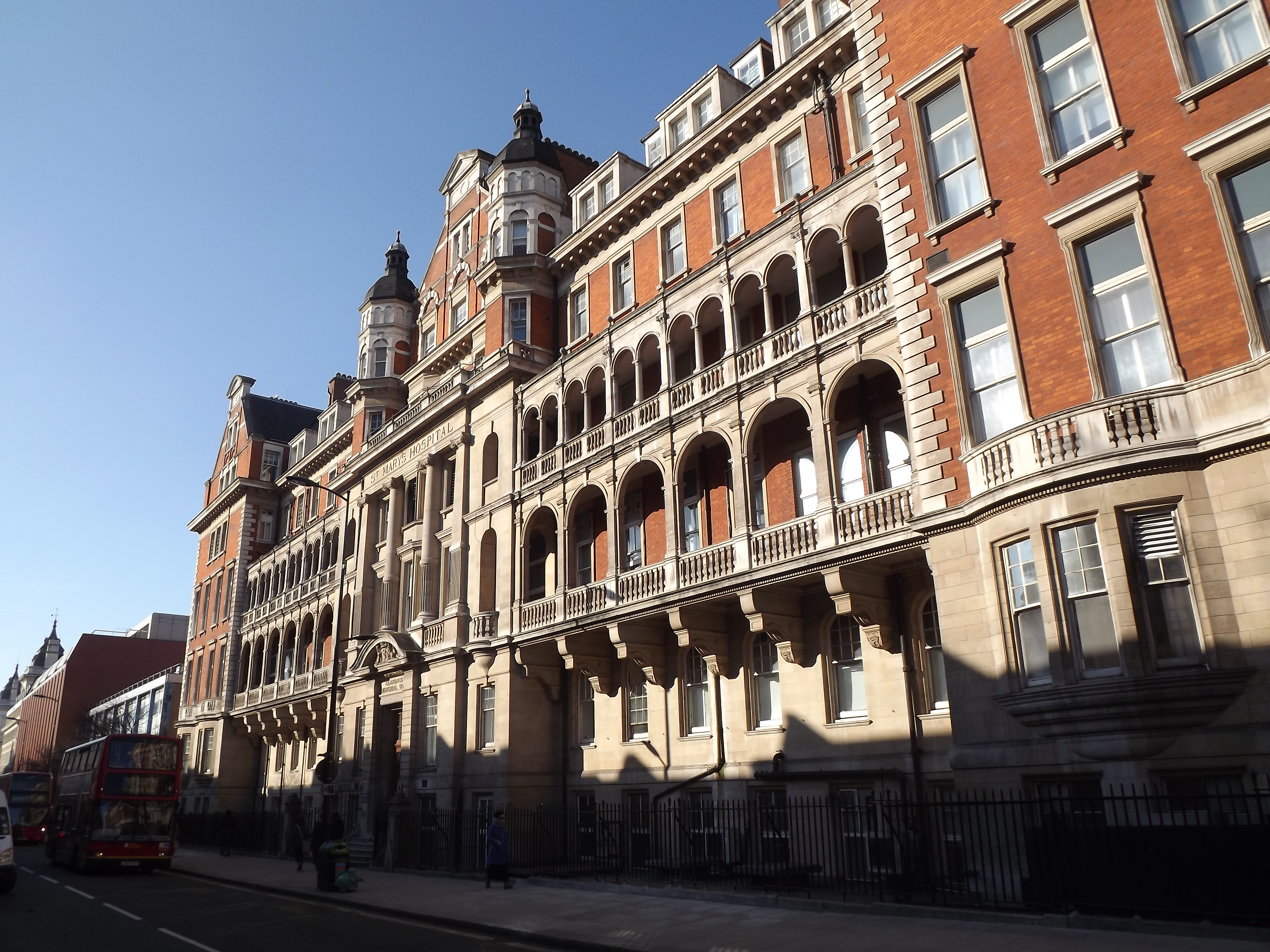
St Mary's Hospital, London

The Imperial Faculty of Medicine was formed through mergers between Imperial and the St Mary's, Charing Cross and Westminster, and Royal Postgraduate medical schools and has six teaching hospitals. It accepts more than 300 undergraduate medical students per year and has around 321 taught and 700 research full-time equivalent postgraduate students.

Imperial College Healthcare NHS Trust was formed on 1 October 2007 by the merger of Hammersmith Hospitals NHS Trust (Charing Cross Hospital, Hammersmith Hospital and Queen Charlotte's and Chelsea Hospital) and St Mary's NHS Trust (St. Mary's Hospital and Western Eye Hospital) with Imperial College London Faculty of Medicine. It is an academic health science centre and manages five hospitals: Charing Cross Hospital, Queen Charlotte's and Chelsea Hospital, Hammersmith Hospital, St Mary's Hospital, and Western Eye Hospital. The Trust is currently one of the largest in the UK and in 2012/13 had a turnover of £971.3 million, employed approximately 9,770 people and treated almost 1.2 million patients.

Other (non-academic health science centres) hospitals affiliated with Imperial College include Chelsea and Westminster Hospital, Royal Brompton Hospital, West Middlesex University Hospital, Hillingdon Hospital, Mount Vernon Hospital, Harefield Hospital, Ealing Hospital, Central Middlesex Hospital, Northwick Park Hospital, St Mark's Hospital, St Charles' Hospital and St Peter's Hospital.

=== Reputation and rankings ===
Rankings
National rankings
- Complete (2027): 5
- Guardian (2027): 5
- Times / Sunday Times (2027): 3

Global rankings
- ARWU (2026): 29
- QS (2027): 2
- THE (2026): 8

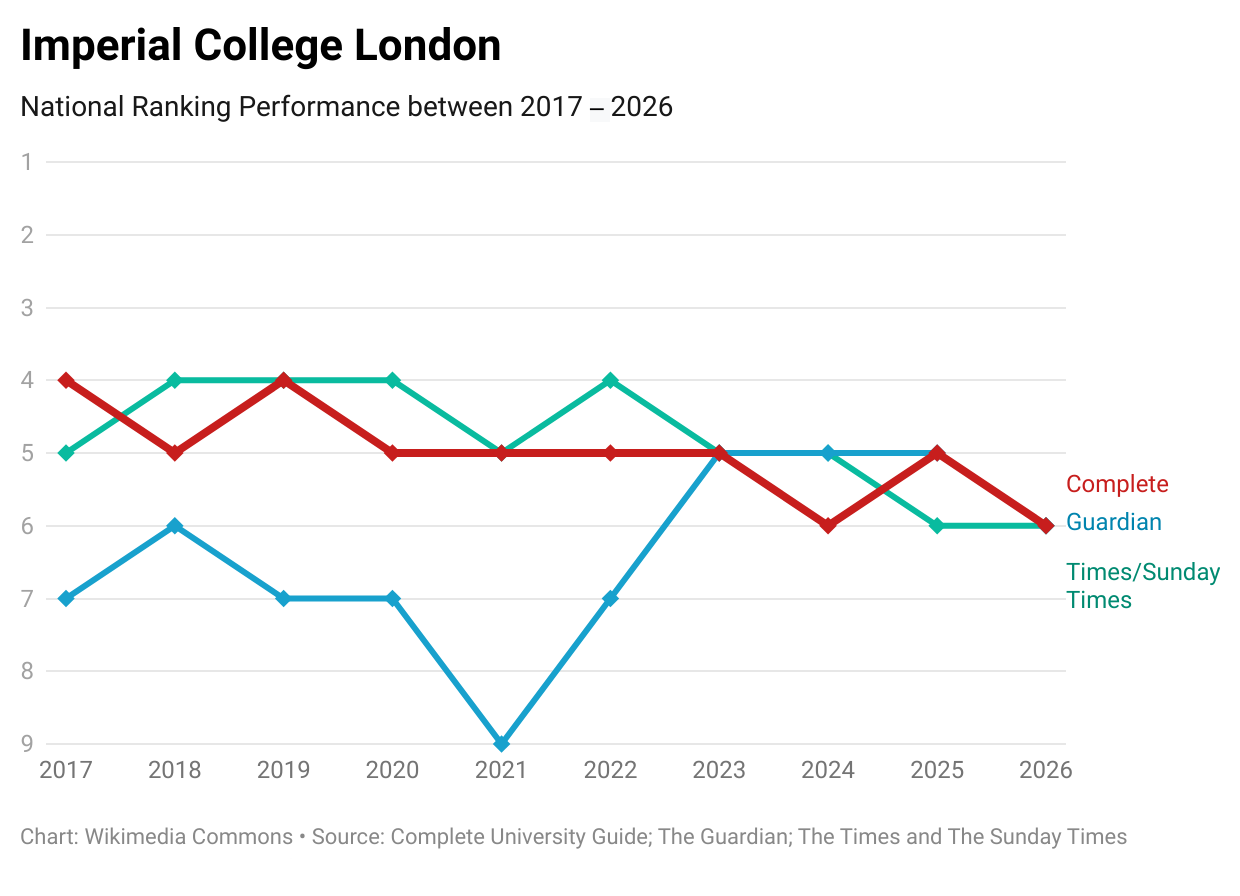
National league tables over ten years

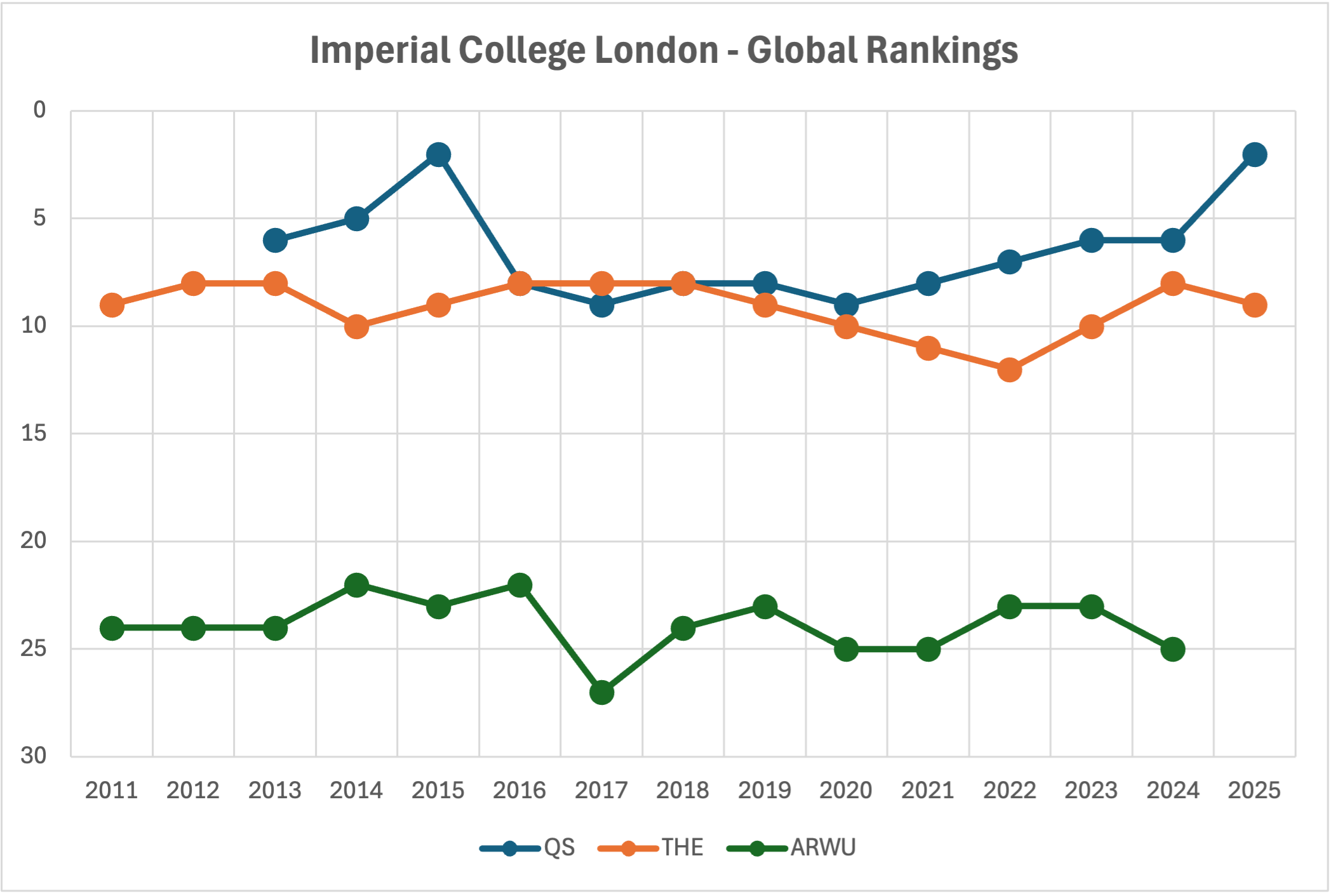
Global league tables over the years

Imperial College London is widely recognised as one of the UK's elite universities. In the 2026 national rankings, it was placed sixth by the Complete University Guide, the Guardian University Guide and the Times and Sunday Times Good University Guide. Imperial was named as the Times and Sunday Times University of the Year for 2027. Globally, it was ranked second, after MIT, in the 2026 QS World University Rankings, eighth in the 2026 Times Higher Education World University Rankings, and 26th in the Shanghai Academic Ranking of World Universities. Imperial was ranked eighth in the world in Time magazine's 2026 ranking.

Imperial is known for its entrepreneurial culture, which blends business studies with the sciences. It provides facilities such as the enterprise lab, which one in eight students use and which reports a 79 per cent startup survival rate. Reflecting this, the 2023 QS MBA Rankings by career specialisation ranked its MBA programme third worldwide for entrepreneurship.

Imperial's focus on practical subjects – engineering, science, medicine and business – along with its emphasis on entrepreneurship and industry placements, have given it a strong ranking for employability: in the 2026 Guardian University Guide, Imperial received the highest score in the highly skilled employment or further studies component.

== Student life ==
=== Student body ===
For the 2024/25 academic year, Imperial had a total full-time student body of 19,400, consisting of 10,475 undergraduate students and 8,925 postgraduates. 50.7% of the student body is from outside of the UK. 32% of all full-time students came from outside the European Union in 2013–14, and around 13% of the International students had Chinese nationality in 2007–08. Imperial's male to female ratio for undergraduate students is uneven at approximately 64:36 overall, and 5:1 or higher in some engineering courses. However, medicine has an approximate 1:1 ratio with biology degrees tending to be higher.

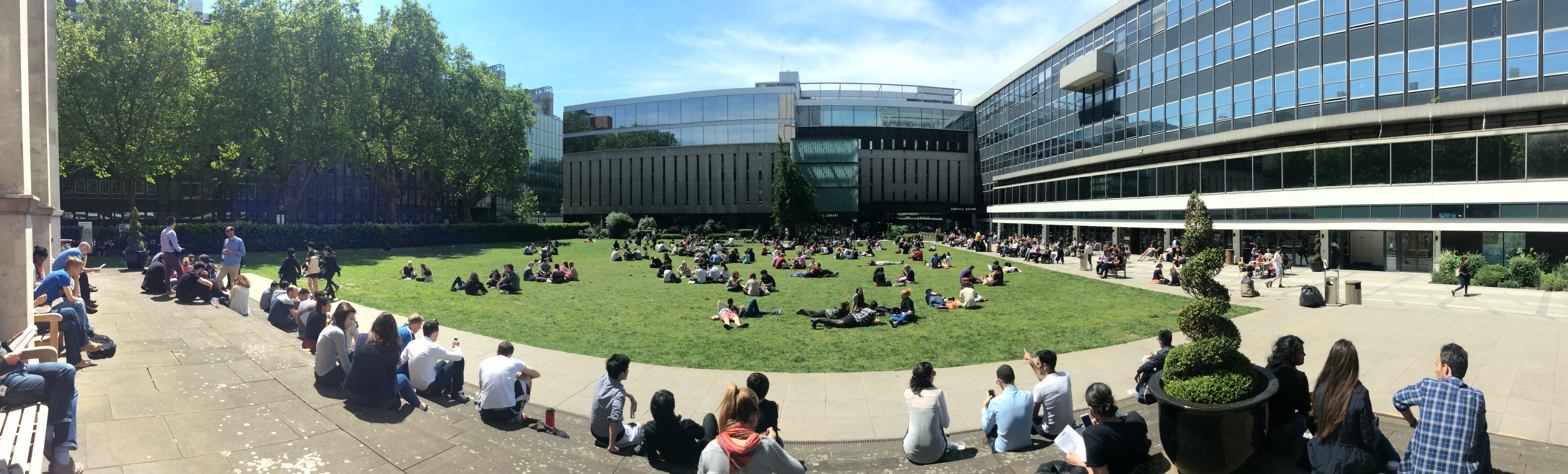
Queen's Lawn at South Kensington Campus

=== Imperial College Union ===
Imperial College Union is the students' union and is run by five full-time sabbatical officers elected from the student body for a tenure of one year, and a number of permanent members of staff. It is split into constituent unions aligned with the faculties of the college, carrying on the association with the original constituent colleges of Imperial, the Royal College of Science Union, City and Guilds College Union, Royal School of Mines Students' Union and Imperial College School of Medicine Students' Union. The union is given a large subvention by the university, much of which is spent on maintaining over 300 clubs, projects and societies.

==== Student societies ====
Imperial College London has over 350 student clubs, societies and projects. The Techtonics, Imperial's all-male contemporary a capella group, won the International Championship of Collegiate A Cappella in 2016.

Other notable student groups and projects include Project Nepal, which sends Imperial College students to work on educational development programmes in rural Nepal, and the El Salvador Project, a construction based project in Central America.

==== Facilities ====
The union operates on two sites, with most events at the Union Building on Beit Quad in South Kensington, with most Imperial College School of Medicine events at the Reynold's Bar at Charing Cross Hospital.

There are two student bars on the South Kensington campus, one at the Imperial College Union and one at Eastside. There are a number of pubs and bars on campus and also surrounding the campus, which become a popular social activity for Imperial's students. The Pewter tankard collection at Imperial College Union is the largest in Europe, with the majority of clubs and societies having tankards associated with their clubs.

==== Student media ====
Student media at Imperial includes Felix, the university newspaper, and Imperial College Radio.

=== Sports ===
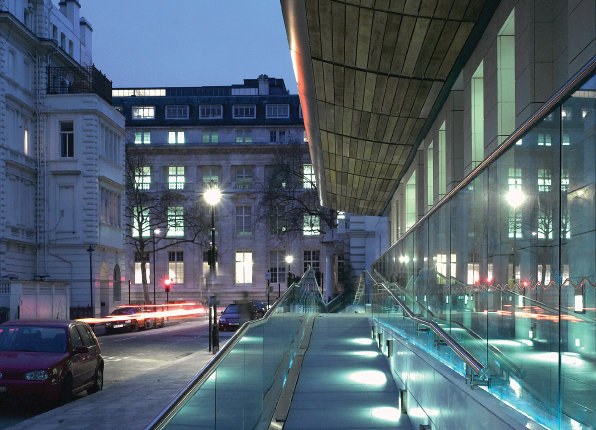
Ethos Gym

Sports at Imperial are organised by Imperial Athletes, run as a collaboration between Imperial College Union and the university's Move Imperial programme. This sports over 90 sports clubs, many of which participate in British Universities and Colleges Sport leagues or the London University Sports Leagues. The Imperial Leagues offer intramural sports at the university within the Imperial Athletes organisation.

Notable sports clubs include Imperial College Boat Club.

Sports facilities at Imperial's London campuses include four gyms, including the main Ethos gym at the South Kensington Campus, two swimming pools and two sports halls. Imperial has additional sports facilities at the Heston and Harlington sports grounds. On the South Kensington campus, there are a total of six music practice rooms which consist of upright pianos for usage by people of any grade, and grand pianos which are exclusively for people who have achieved Grade 8 or above.

==== The Bottle Match ====
The annual Bottle Match, a varsity rugby fixture between Imperial's Royal School of Mines and the University of Exeter's Camborne School of Mines, is the second oldest in the world. The first recorded match took place in 1902. The Bottle Match is traditionally held in February, normally on the third weekend of the month. The match reflects a long-standing rivalry between the two mining schools.

=== Exploration Board ===
Imperial's Exploration Board was established in 1955 and funds student expeditions as well as recognising them as official Imperial projects. It also maintains an archive of past expeditions.

=== Drinking societies ===
While many Imperial student activities are inclusive and run by the Imperial College Union, Imperial is also home to several highly exclusive social clubs often referred to as "tie clubs" or "drinking societies". Historically centered around students from the constituent colleges, the three most prominent clubs are The 22s, The Links, and The Chaps. These invite-only societies, dominated by alumni who were active in the student union and sports (particularly rugby) maintain strong connections to the university. Their existence has been a source of controversy within the student community, with critics pointing out their "elitist" and often secretive nature. For instance, the historically all-male The 22s and accusations of "tokenism" against The Links have led to calls for Imperial College Union to enforce stricter equal opportunities standards, especially since members of these tie clubs have traditionally held highly influential positions within the union's sabbatical and governance structures.

=== Mascotry ===
Imperial has a tradition of mascotry, historically intense custom of rivalry, theft, and ransom between the student bodies of its founding constituent unions. This practice involves mascots. Violate mascots, ceremonial objects that are targets of theft and ransom demands, often for RAG (Raising and Giving) charity include the Royal College of Science's seven-foot-long thermometer Theta and the City and Guilds Union's heavy bronze Spanner and Bolt. This tradition of competitive stealing is subject to official Imperial College Union rules to prevent violence or property damage. The four famous antique motorised vehicles such as the 1916 Dennis N-Type Fire Engine Jezebel and the 1902 car Boanerges are classified as inviolate (protected from theft). These motorised mascots are meticulously maintained and regularly paraded by student motor clubs at ceremonial and public events, ensuring that the engineering and historical pride of the constituent unions remains an active part of student life.

=== Music and arts ===
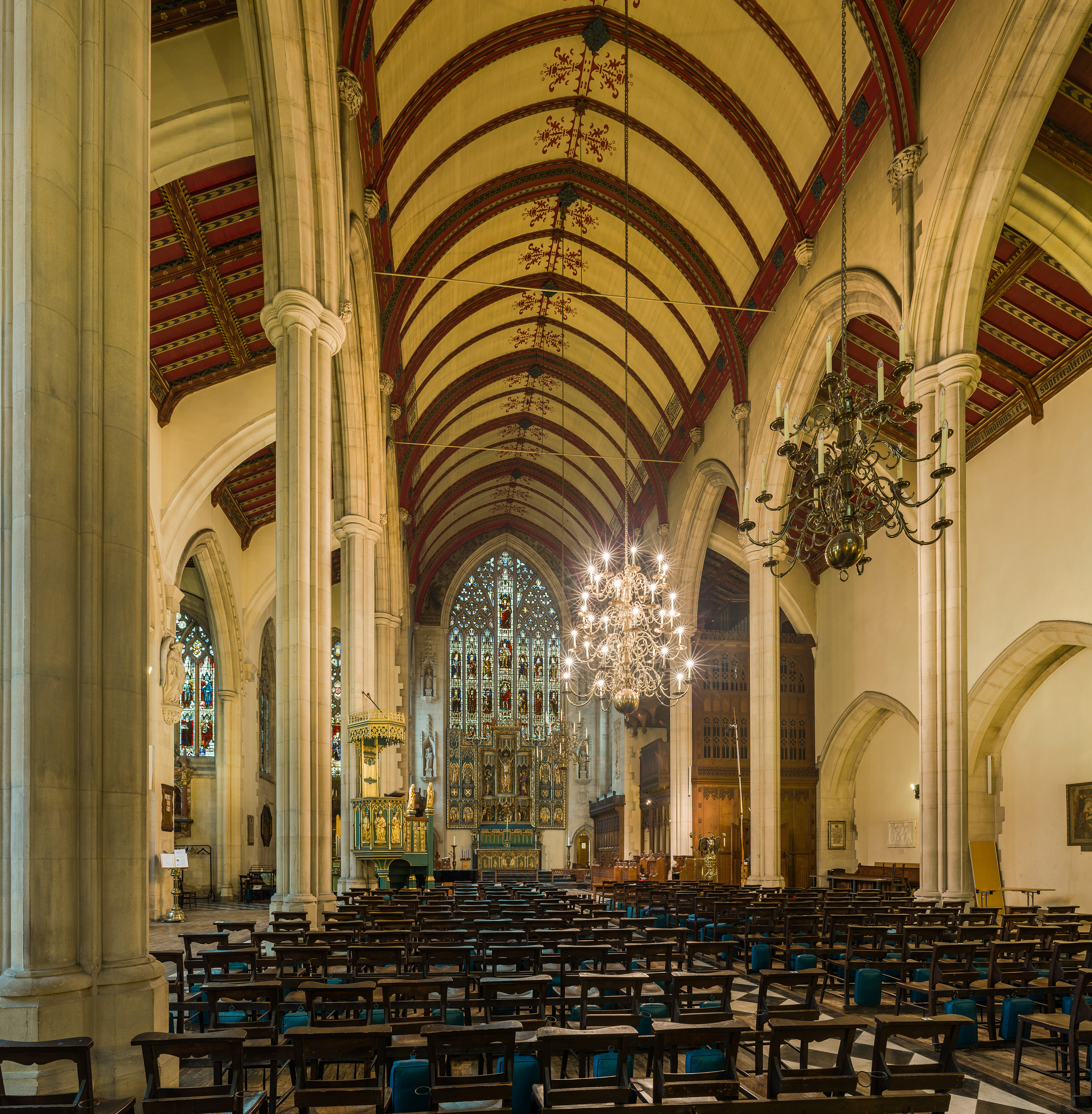
Interior of the Holy Trinity Church in South Kensington, the venue for many Blyth Centre public performances

The Blyth Centre for Music and Visual Arts offers resources such as music scholarships, art classes and practice rooms. The centre organises the university's regular series of public performances, many of which take place off-campus at the nearby Holy Trinity Church on Prince Consort Road. These run during term time and feature both professional artists and Imperial students, including Ash Music Scholars and ensembles such as the Imperial College Chamber Choir. The programme also includes a lunchtime concert series and formal college evensong services.

The rock band Queen performed one of their first gigs in the Union Concert Hall. The band was formed when Brian May placed an advert on the noticeboard in the union looking for a '"Mitch Mitchell/Ginger Baker type" drummer' and Roger Taylor responded.

Each year Imperial Business School organises a major annual social event, often referred to as the "Winter Party" or "Winter Ball", at the adjacent Natural History Museum. This exclusive, after-hours event transforms the museum's Hintze Hall into a grand venue for hundreds of students to celebrate and socialise under the iconic 25-meter blue whale skeleton.

Imperial is a key partner in the Great Exhibition Road Festival, a free annual celebration of science and the arts held in South Kensington, in collaboration with neighboring institutions like the Natural History Museum, Science Museum, V&A, and Royal Albert Hall. The festival, which succeeded the annual Imperial Festival, draws over 50,000 visitors with a weekend of talks, interactive exhibits showcasing Imperial's research, and performances.

=== Commemoration Day ===
The university's main graduation ceremony, Commemoration Day, takes place annually in early summer at the Royal Albert Hall, a tradition that has been in place for over 60 years. The naming of Commemoration Day dates back to a 1945 visit by King George VI and Queen Elizabeth to mark the centenary of the Royal College of Science.

== Notable alumni, academics and other staff ==
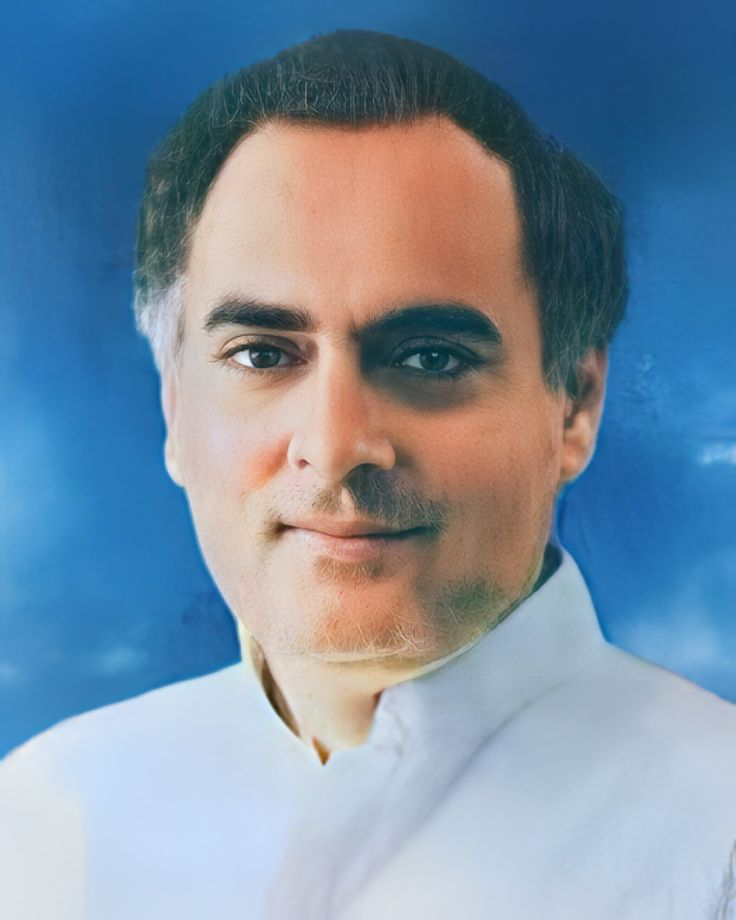
Rajiv Gandhi, Prime Minister of India

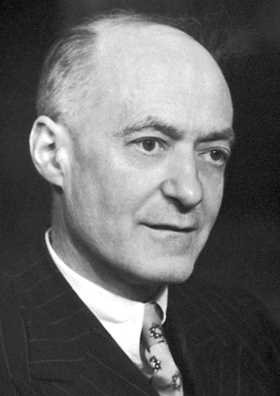
Sir Cyril Norman Hinshelwood

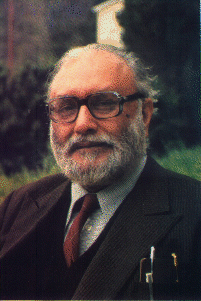
Abdus Salam

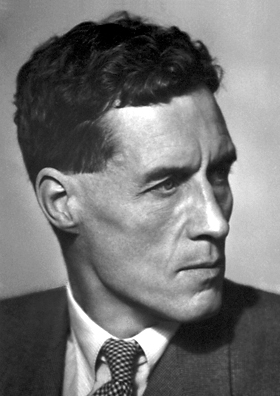
Patrick Blackett

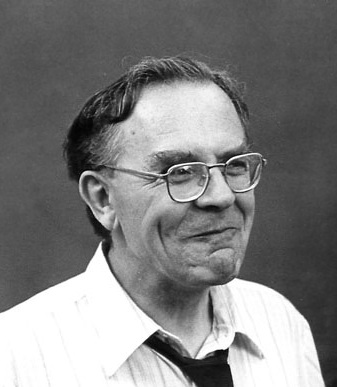
Geoffrey Wilkinson

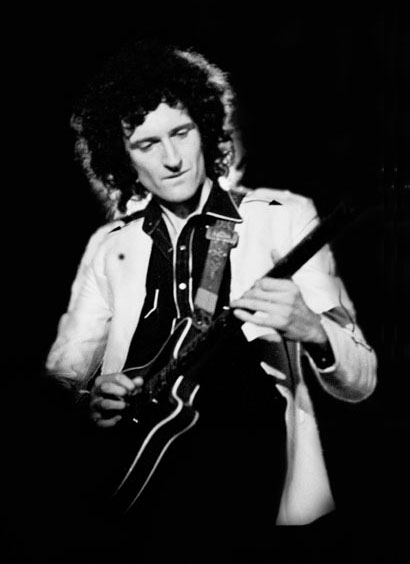
Sir Brian May

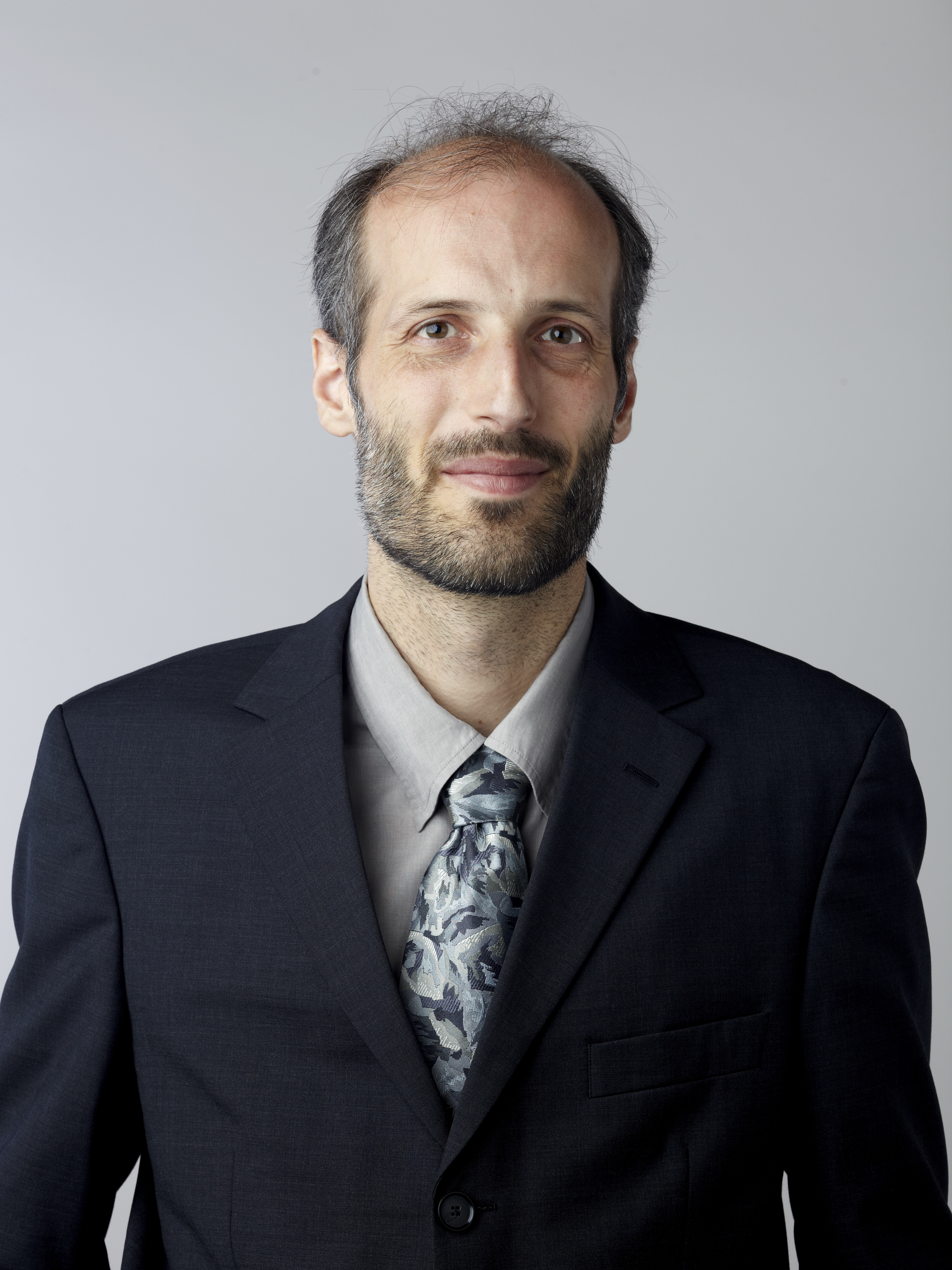
Sir Martin Hairer

14 Nobel laureates have been associated with Imperial or one of the institutions that have since merged with it. This includes Sir Alexander Fleming (physiology/medicine), Sir Ernst Boris Chain (medicine), Abdus Salam (physics), Sir George Paget Thomson (physics), Patrick Blackett (physics), Dennis Gabor (physics), Sir Norman Haworth (chemistry), Sir Cyril Norman Hinshelwood (chemistry), Sir George Porter (chemistry), Sir Derek Barton (chemistry), Sir Geoffrey Wilkinson (chemistry), Sir Frederick Gowland Hopkins (physiology/medicine), Sir Andrew Huxley (physiology/medicine) and Rodney Porter (physiology/medicine) Fields Medals, regarded as one of the highest honours for mathematicians, have been awarded to Klaus Friedrich Roth, Sir Simon Donaldson and Martin Hairer.

Academics: Sir Tom Kibble, co-discoverer of the Higgs Boson; Guy Callender, engineer and climatologist (Callendar Effect); Dame Sally Davies, former Chief Medical Officer for England; Sir Edward Frankland, originator of the theory of chemical valency; Sir William Henry Perkin, inventor of the first synthetic dye, mauveine; Sir William Crookes, discoverer of the thallium George E. Davis, founding father of chemical engineering; Sir Alec Skempton, one of the founding fathers of soil mechanics; Sir John Ambrose Fleming, inventor of the vacuum tube; Narinder Singh Kapany, inventor of fibre optics; William Penney, Baron Penney, mathematician and chief architect of the UK’s atomic bomb; Sir Steven Cowley, president of Corpus Christi College, Oxford; Julia King, Baroness Brown of Cambridge, Member of the House of Lords; Sir Huw Thomas, Physician to the Queen and James "Jim" Skea, Chair of the Intergovernmental Panel on Climate Change (IPCC) for its seventh assessment cycle. There are about 90 Imperial-associated Fellows of the Royal Society.

Imperial alumni in other fields include: Andreas Mogensen, first Danish astronaut; David Warren, inventor of the flight data recorder and cockpit voice recorder; Nikolas Tombazis, chief car designer at McLaren and Ferrari and Nicola Fox, Head of Science at NASA. In business: Ralph Robins, CEO of Rolls-Royce; Chew Choon Seng, CEO of Singapore Airlines; Cyrus Pallonji Mistry, chairman of the Tata Group; Ian Read, CEO of Pfizer; Iain Conn, former CEO of Centrica; Danny Lui, co-founder of Lenovo; Michael Cowpland, founder of Corel; Alan Howard, co-founder of Brevan Howard and philanthropist; Michael Birch, founder of Bebo and Andrew Rickman, CEO of Rockley Photonics and UK's first tech billionaire.

In politics: Rajiv Gandhi, former Prime Minister of India; Teo Chee Hean, Senior Minister of Singapore; Edem Tengue, Minister of maritime economy of the Republic of Togo; Chen Jining, Mayor of Beijing, Secretary of Shanghai and Dyah Roro Esti Widya Putri, member of House of Representatives of the Republic of Indonesia.

In media: H. G. Wells, author; Simon Singh, author and Brian May, guitarist of rock band Queen. Olympians include: Louis Attrill, Simon Dennis, Luka Grubor and Steve Trapmore, gold medallists in rowing at the 2000 Summer Olympics; Daniel Rowden, English middle-distance runner, British champion and Olympian; Henry Fieldman, rowing coxswain, twice world champion and two-time Olympic medallist and Melanie Wilson, 2016 Summer Olympics silver medallist in rowing.

== See also ==
- Albertopolis
- Armorial of UK universities
- Education in London
- List of universities in the UK
