= Boilermaker Special =

Mascot of Purdue University

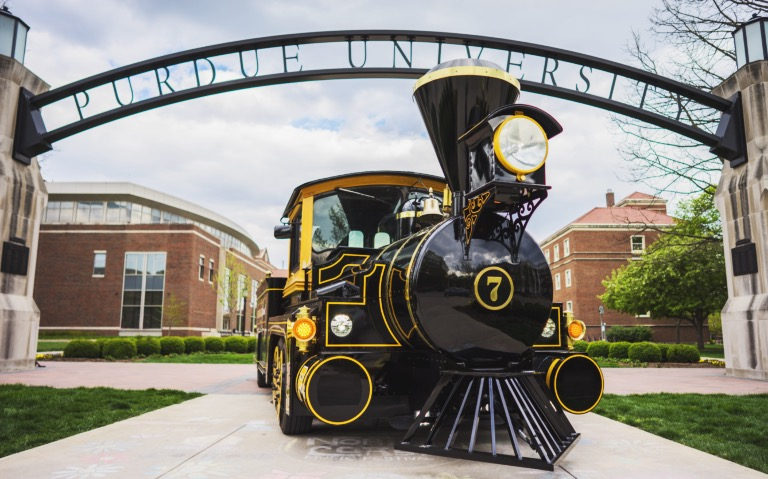
The Boilermaker Special, the Official Mascot of Purdue University, stands parked underneath the Gateway to the Future Arch.

The Boilermaker Special is the official mascot of Purdue University in West Lafayette, Indiana. It resembles a Victorian-era railroad locomotive and is built on a truck chassis. It is operated and maintained by the student members of the Purdue Reamer Club. It is often incorrectly assumed that Purdue Pete is the official mascot of the university.

== Inspiration for the Boilermaker Special ==
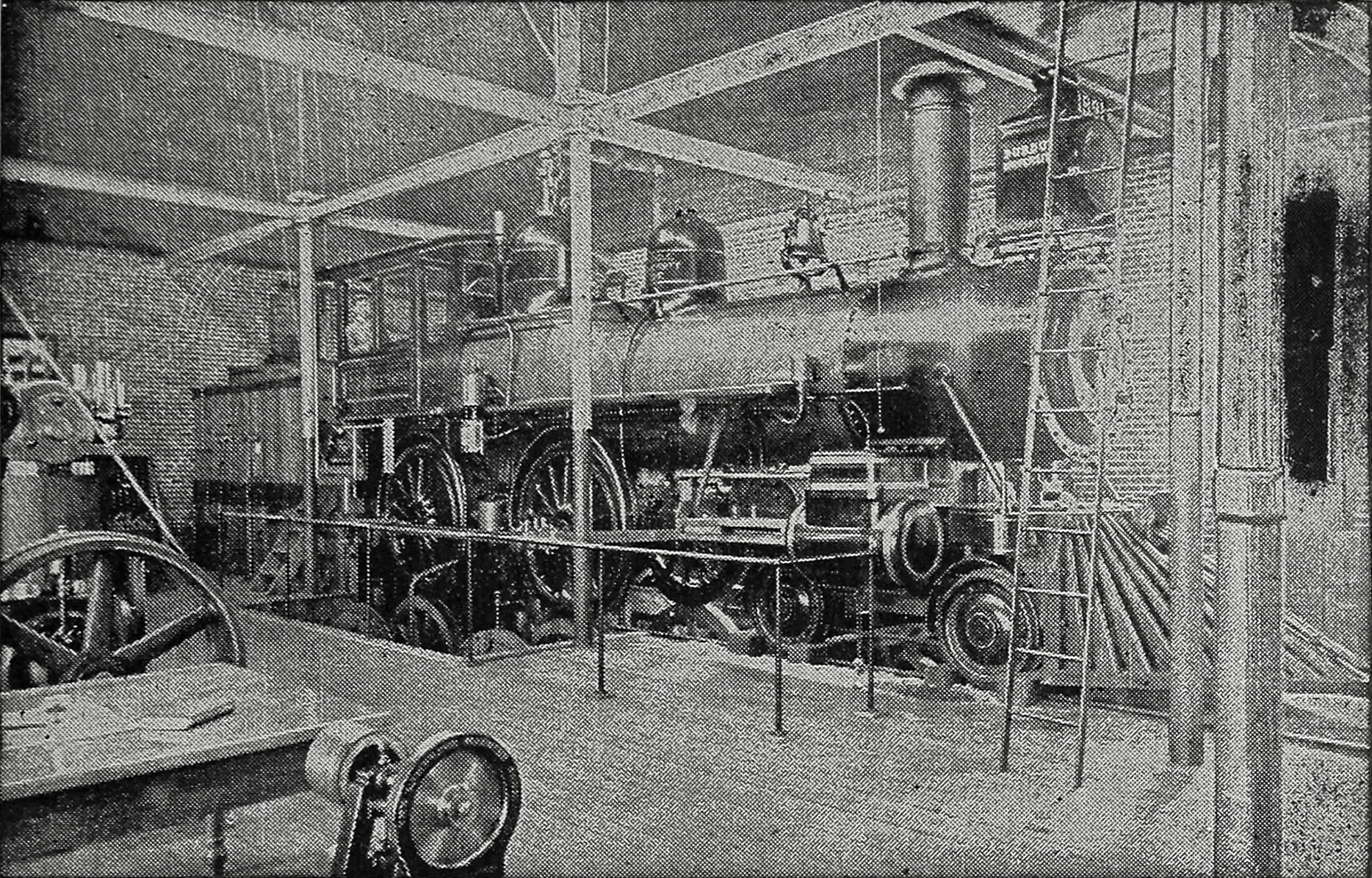
"Schenectady No. 1" on the locomotive dynamometer stand in Purdue's engineering laboratory in 1892.

Purdue University is a land-grant university (or Agricultural and Mechanical (A&M) university) created through the Morrill Act of 1862. In the 1890s, Purdue became a leader in the research of railway technology. For many years Purdue operated the "Schenectady No. 1", "Schenectady No. 2", and the "Vauclain" on a dynamometer in an engineering laboratory on the West Lafayette campus. The Schenectady No. 1 and 2 were 4-4-0 "American"-type steam locomotives manufactured by (and named for) the Schenectady Locomotive Works of Schenectady, New York. They were typical U.S. steam locomotives of the 1890s, a period both of rapid change in the technology of steam locomotives and of the intense interest in understanding their performance that inspired the creation of Purdue's locomotive testing program. Purdue even operated its own railroad to connect the campus powerplant to a main rail line. The American Railway Association Building, which stands on the West Lafayette campus to the southwest of the Mechanical Engineering Building, is one of the few remaining vestiges of the railroad testing which occurred on the campus. It was constructed in 1926 to test railroad car draft gears. Locomotive research ended in 1938 when the Vauclain's boiler was declared unsafe and the dynamometer was decommissioned.

== Creation of the mascot ==
For many years Purdue did not have a mascot. In 1939, Purdue pharmacy student Israel Selkowitz suggested the school adopt an official mascot to represent Purdue's engineering heritage. He originally proposed a "mechanical man". After much debate, it was decided to build a locomotive on an automobile chassis. This choice allowed the mascot to build on Purdue's engineering and railroading heritage, as well as represent the school's nickname "Boilermakers" in a meaningful way.

The "Boilermaker" nickname came about during the early years of Purdue football. There had been rumors the university enrolled burly boilermakers from the Monon Railroad shops in Lafayette, Indiana as students/football players to help beef up the scrawny football team after a 44–0 victory over Wabash College in 1891. When a railroad operated an extra train independent of the scheduled timetable, it was known as a "special". Thus, the trains which carried Purdue's sporting teams and their fans to other cities for athletic contests were known as "Boilermaker Specials".

Financial support and encouragement to build the first Boilermaker Special were provided by key members of the Purdue University graduating class of 1907, and members of the Purdue Reamer Club from the graduating classes of 1940 and 1941.

== Boilermaker Special I ==
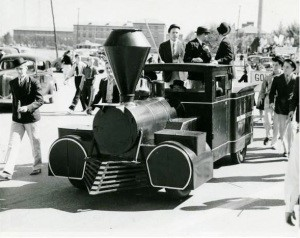
The Boilermaker Special I (1940 - 1953)

The Boilermaker Special I was introduced in 1940. The locomotive body was constructed by the Baldwin Locomotive Works and installed on a 1939 "Champion" automobile chassis donated by the Studebaker Corporation (South Bend, Indiana). The chassis had a 6-cylinder in-line gasoline engine and a three-speed manual transmission. The gearshift was on the steering column. The cab contained a single bench seat for the driver and one passenger. Although the coal tender area was not designed for passengers, one passenger could sit on top each of the wheel fenders. The cab had two sheetmetal doors, one on each side, each of which had an open window. Although the cab had a windshield, the back only had a window opening with no glass. This meant the wind and weather would enter the cab from the back.

The bell and the whistle on the boiler are believed to have been donated by the Monon Railroad shops in Lafayette. The whistle used exhaust from the engine as its source of compressed gas. Although the cab had marker lights, the only driving light was the single 'cyclops' light mounted high on the front of the boiler. Due to the high placement of the single headlight and a minimal number of other exterior lights, Boilermaker Special I was not driven at night for safety reasons. In honor of the Purdue students and alumni who contributed to the project, the numbers "074041" were later installed in the sides of the headlight.

== Boilermaker Special II ==
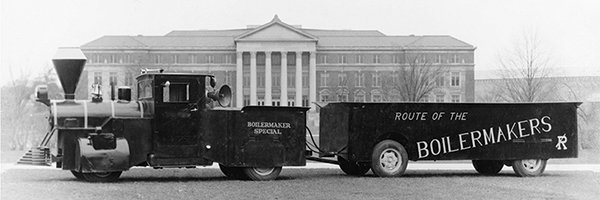
The Boilermaker Special II (1953–1960) and its trailer (1956–1993)

In 1953, the Boilermaker Special II was created by installing the original Baldwin body from the Boilermaker Special I on an International Harvester truck chassis. This meant that the Boilermaker Special II was visually identical to the Boilermaker Special I.

After the Boilermaker Special III was introduced, the Boilermaker Special II was scrapped in a Lafayette IN salvage yard. This was personally witnessed by Reamer Club member Roger Brunstrum so that no one could later claim it was purchased from the scrap yard.

== Boilermaker Special trailer ==
A matching trailer was introduced in 1956 to provide seats for about 30 passengers. Passengers boarded the trailer by a set of stairs at the rear of the trailer. One member of the Reamer Club rode the trailer at the stairs to prevent anyone from boarding or exiting the trailer while the trailer was in motion and to communicate with those towing the trailer.

The trailer was similar to a wagon in that the front wheels were steered by a towing yoke. The trailer also had pneumatic brakes which received compressed air from the Boilermaker Special via pneumatic connections adjacent to the trailer hitch. The brakes on the trailer were remotely actuated independently from the brakes on the Boilermaker Special by a hand-operated lever mounted to the right side of the Boilermaker Special's steering column. When it was desired to stop the train, the Pilot had to simultaneously operate the foot brake for the Boilermaker Special and the hand brake for the trailer.

While the trailer did provide additional passenger seating, it was difficult to tow. The brakes worked best when the trailer was fully loaded. When the trailer was lightly loaded, the braking action was excessive, which resulted in the wheels locking and skidding when the brakes were applied. Since the trailer brakes were remotely operated by a hand lever, and the Pilot always had to be ready to operate the brakes, the Pilot had to keep one hand on the trailer brake lever at all times while the Boilermaker Special was moving in the event an emergency stop had to be executed. This meant the Pilot was always driving with only one hand on the steering wheel when the trailer was in use. If the Pilot forgot to operate the trailer brakes when the Boilermaker Special's foot brake was operated, the trailer might jack-knife, particularly if more passengers were seated on one side of the trailer. Also, the steering action of the front trailer wheels was not damped, so the towing speed of the trailer was limited to 25 miles per hour. If the trailer hit a bump when above 25 mph, a stable, rapid, side-to-side oscillation was induced in the front of the trailer that could only be stopped by slowing the trailer below 20 mph. This oscillating motion was very uncomfortable and disturbing to the passengers. Finally, since the front wheels were steered by the towing yoke, the trailer could not be pushed backwards by the Boilermaker Special. It always had to be towed in a forward direction. If it was necessary to move the trailer backwards, the trailer had to be completely disconnected from the Boilermaker Special and manually pushed backwards while being manually steered with the towing yoke.

In later years the trailer was infrequently used. It was retired and scrapped in 1993 when the Boilermaker Special V was introduced. Beginning with Boilermaker Special III, the Boilermaker Special had sufficient seating capacity in the "coal tender" area to accommodate most groups. Boilermaker Special V was neither equipped with a trailer hitch nor pneumatic connections to supply the trailer's brakes. As a result, the trailer could no longer be towed and was no longer needed.

== Boilermaker Special III ==
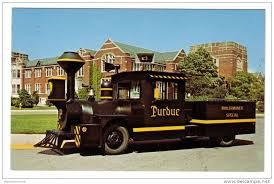
The Boilermaker Special III (1960 - 1993)

In 1960, the Boilermaker Special III was introduced. It was built in Detroit by the General Motors Corporation on a 2-ton GMC school bus chassis. It was initially powered by a Buick 6-cylinder gasoline engine connected to a two-speed manual transmission. A single rear axle with dual wheels and a manual-shift, two-speed differential rounded out the drive train. It also featured a pneumatic brake system. A trailer hitch and pneumatic fittings were at the rear of the vehicle to tow the trailer introduced in 1956.

Boilermaker Special III featured an all-new body that was much larger and visually different than the Baldwin-manufactured body used on Boilermaker Specials I and II. The cab and coal tender were constructed of plywood with facings of sheet steel on each side. Forward of the cab, the body was heavy sheet steel and steel plate. The brass bell originally installed on Boilermaker Specials I and II was installed on the boiler. A new headlight was installed at the front of the boiler. It featured a standard automotive 12-volt marker bulb reflected by a large parabolic mirror. It was so bright it could only be used during parades. A locomotive air horn was installed on the top left side of the cab. When the horn was sounded, the Boilermaker Special III could be heard from miles away. To complete the locomotive theme, "steam" could be sprayed from the smokestack. The steam was actually carbon dioxide released by the driver from a fire extinguisher cylinder within the cab and plumbed to a nozzle just below the top of the smokestack.

The body featured a full 12-volt negative ground electrical system powered by an alternator. It supplied power to concealed four-beam headlights, parking/marker lights, brake lights, backup lights, instrument lights, electric windshield wipers, a single-speed heater blower, and a radio/public address system. With this equipment, the Boilermaker Special III was capable of day or night operation on most improved roads, including highways. The original headlight from Boilermaker Special I was initially installed on the back of the coal tender as a rear-facing safety light. It was later removed and installed as the headlight of the Boilermaker IV in 1979. A white block P was displayed on the front of the boiler directly below the large front headlight. The block P was mounted to a metal mesh screen which allowed external cool air to be drawn through the radiator by the engine's radiator fan.

In the 1970s, the original engine and transmission were replaced with a carbureted Chevrolet 350 cubic inch V-8 and a three-speed automatic transmission. The two-speed differential was locked in high gear and shift mechanism removed. A power steering pump and steering assist cylinder were installed to reduce steering effort. In the early 1980s, a brass whistle was installed next to the brass bell and used the same source of compressed air as the large train horn.

In this final configuration, the Boilermaker Special III weighed about 9,300 pounds (4,218 kg). When it was retired in 1993, it had traveled over 110,000 miles (177,027 km).

== Boilermaker X-tra Special IV ==
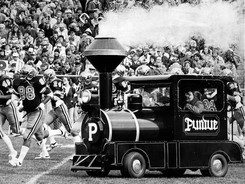
The Boilermaker X-tra Special IV (1979 - 1996)

In 1979, a small version of the Boilermaker Special was introduced. The Boilermaker Special IV, or "X-tra Special" as it became known, was built on an E-Z-GO electric golf cart chassis. This allowed the mascot to be displayed at indoor functions or on softer surfaces (i.e. a turf athletic field) where its massive gasoline-powered, and later diesel-powered big brother could never go. The headlight was the original headlight used on Boilermaker Special I and II. The top of the smokestack could be removed to allow the X-tra Special to fit inside freight elevators and move through standard height, side-by-side walk-through doors. The IV also featured a white block P on the front of the boiler directly below the headlight, just like the Boilermaker Special III.

== Boilermaker Special V ==
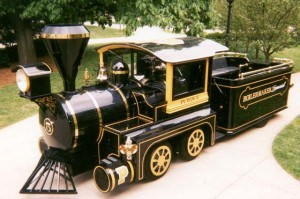
The Boilermaker Special V (1993 - 2011)

Boilermaker Special V was introduced on September 25, 1993. It was built on a Navistar Low-Profile 4600 chassis and powered by a non-turbocharged V-8 diesel engine. The Navistar chassis was donated by the Navistar International Corporation (formerly International Harvester). The body was primarily constructed of aluminum which was donated by Alcoa, which has an aluminum processing factory in Lafayette, Indiana. The aluminum body was fabricated and installed on the chassis by the Wabash National Corporation, also of Lafayette, Indiana. Like the Boilermaker Special III, the Boilermaker Special V had pneumatic brakes. However, there was neither a trailer hitch nor pneumatic brake fittings at the rear of the vehicle. As a result, the trailer introduced in 1956 could no longer be towed.

The brass bell from Boilermaker Special I and the brass whistle from Boilermaker Special III were installed on the boiler. A five-chime freight train horn from a Norfolk Southern locomotive was installed on the body. The coal tender was large enough to seat up to 14 passengers. The Special was able to "kneel", which allowed children and the elderly easier access to the coal tender. Despite the extensive use of aluminum in the body, the Boilermaker Special V weighed 10,800 pounds (4,900 kg), nearly 1,500 pounds (680 kg) more than the previous version. The Boilermaker Special V was the first to feature an Arabic number "5" on the front of the boiler directly below the headlight.

== Boilermaker X-tra Special VI ==
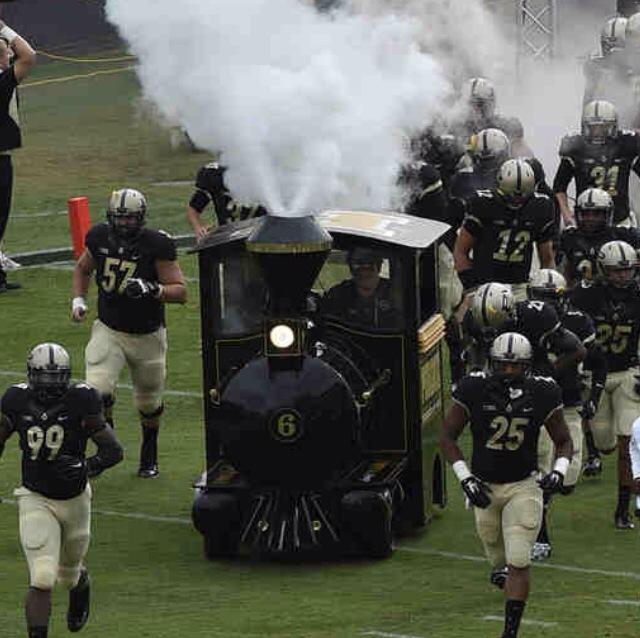
The Boilermaker X-tra Special VI (1996 - 2017) leads the football team onto the field at Ross-Ade Stadium

X-tra Special IV was later disassembled to make way for X-tra Special VI. Joe Peñaloza, a Purdue University graduate, designed the VI. It was built on a Club Car golf cart chassis, which was donated by Angel Hills Golf Course in Rossville, Indiana. The exterior body was made of a fiberglass composite, donated by Brunswick Tech. The structural work was done mainly at Wabash National. The fiberglass body was formed by Dr. Ray Thompson and his aviation composite materials class at the Purdue Airport. The paint was applied by West Coast Customs and donated by Valspar Corp. Pyramids Sign and Design completed all the detail paintwork. Many of the other materials used in the creation of VI were donated. These items include the brass, which was donated by ABC Metals Inc., bagging material for the composite-forming/curing process was donated by Decomp, specialty foams donated by Diab, resin used before painting donated by Resin Services, and the lights and safety devices were donated by TSD.

The X-tra Special VI was dedicated Saturday October 19, 1996 at the homecoming game against Ohio State at the end of the half time show. The X-tra Special VI was used in both basketball and football games. The last public appearance by the Boilermaker Special VI was on October 7, 2017, at the Minnesota-Purdue football game in West Lafayette Indiana. The VI led the football team onto the field for the start of the game alongside its replacement, the Boilermaker Special VIII.

== Boilermaker Special VII ==
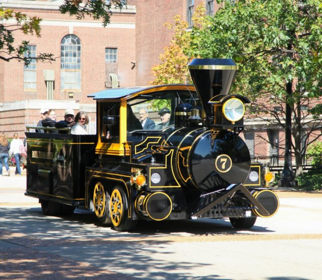
The Boilermaker Special VII (2011 - Present) with the cow catcher in the up position

In 2011, the Boilermaker Special V underwent a significant overhaul with the help of the Wabash National corporation. With over 200,000 miles (321,868 km), it was in need of a new engine, transmission and chassis. In June 2011, the university confirmed the overhauled mascot would indeed be branded as Boilermaker Special VII, which is reflected by the number "7" displayed on the front of the train's boiler. The new design was made by Reamer Alumna Beth (Smart) Miller (F'06). The body was changed slightly to adjust to the new parts, as well as a slight change in the paint scheme. New whistles and bells were also installed, while retaining the original brass bell from Boilermaker Special I. The Special is outfitted with LED lighting on both its running boards as well as its cyclops. Boilermaker Special VII was presented to the university on September 3, 2011, at halftime of the Middle Tennessee State-Purdue football game. It was dedicated on October 1, 2011, at a luncheon which preceded the Notre Dame-Purdue football game.

=== Fatal crash ===
On April 24, 2025, the Boilermaker Special VII was severely damaged in a traffic accident which resulted in a single fatality. The vehicle was in Tippecanoe County, Indiana, driving north at speed on US Highway 52 at Wyandotte Road when it crossed the grass median and collided with a southbound car. The driver and sole occupant of the southbound car was killed, while the Reamer Club members piloting the Boilermaker Special were taken to a local hospital for minor injuries. The preliminary police investigation determined a catastrophic failure of left front steering tire on the Boilermaker Special caused the crash, which was corroborated by an eyewitness in a southbound vehicle which preceded the deceased's vehicle on the highway. The witness stated she saw the tire blow out and saw the driver of the Boilermaker Special lose control of the vehicle.

== Boilermaker X-tra Special VIII ==
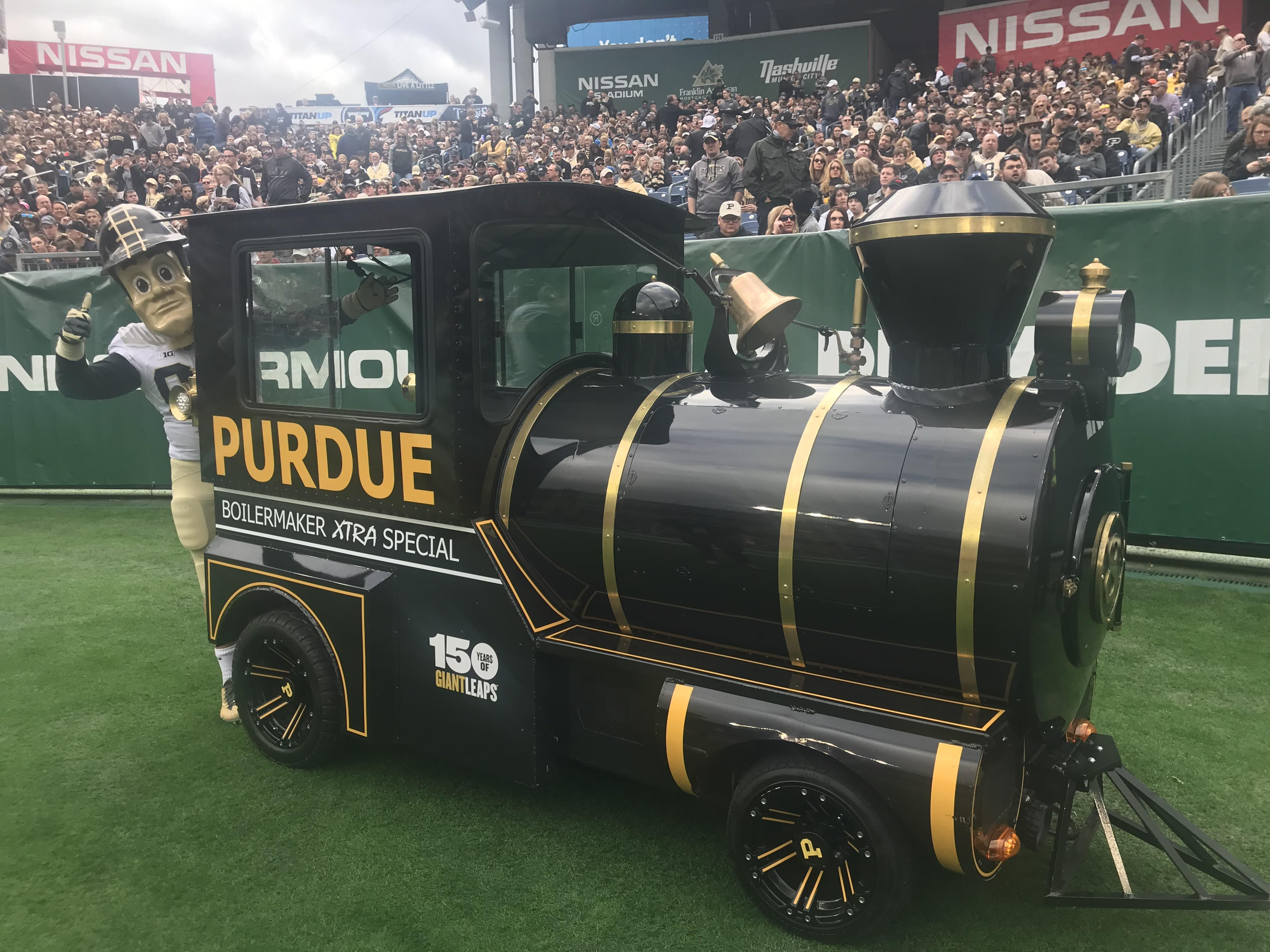
The Boilermaker X-tra Special VIII (2017 - Present)

On June 16, 2017, the Reamer Club announced the Boilermaker Special VI would be retired and replaced by the Boilermaker Special VIII. The VIII was assembled from a new, heavy-duty Caryall Turf 2 golf cart donated by Club Car and a new body designed and fabricated by the Wabash National corporation. The smokestack on the VIII is shorter than those on the IV and VI so that it no longer needs to be disassembled to drive into freight elevators or pass through doorways. The new X-tra Special made its first public appearance in West Lafayette Indiana at the Minnesota-Purdue football game on October 7, 2017, alongside the Boilermaker Special VI, which was making its final public appearance. The VIII led the football team onto the field, and was later featured in an announcement at the stadium during the third media time-out of the first quarter. The Purdue All-American Marching Band also played a tribute to the Boilermaker Special during their pregame performance. The band formed an image of the X-Tra Special on the field, then played "Wabash Cannonball" as the formation moved across the field. The performance included band members discharging fire extinguishers at the top of the formation's smokestack. A private dedication followed the football game at the Purdue Memorial Union. In attendance were active and honorary members of the Reamer Club, recent pledges, university advisors, Wabash National employees, and Reamer Club alumni representing six decades of membership.

== Boilermaker Special IX ==
On September 15, 2023, after a dinner to celebrate the Reamer Club's 100th anniversary, the Reamer Club announced that a new Boilermaker Special IX would be developed to replace the Boilermaker Special VII. Initially it was planned to be ready for service in the summer of 2025. However, due to the accident in April 2025 that involved the Boilermaker Special VII, construction was delayed to incorporate additional safety features. There is no information about when Boilermaker Special IX will be back. As with recent new Boilermaker Specials, Wabash National and Navistar International are expected to contribute to the design and construction.

== Remnants of retired Boilermaker Specials ==
Only a few small pieces of Boilermaker Specials I, II, III, and IV remain in existence. The majority of their bodies and chassis were scrapped when they were retired, primarily to prevent any person or group from later claiming ownership of what was once the Boilermaker Special. The fates of Boilermaker Special VI and Boilermaker Special VII have not been disclosed.

The brass bell from the Boilermaker Special I is the same bell that was used on Boilermaker Specials II, III, and V. It was installed on Boilermaker Special VII. Pieces of sheetmetal from the Boilermaker Special I body containing the painted words "Purdue" and "Boilermaker Special" were saved when the body of Boilermaker II was scrapped in 1960 and remained on display in the Boilermaker Special garage for many years. The cyclops headlight from Boilermaker Special I was saved by the Reamer Club after it was removed from Boilermaker Special II in 1960. Photographs from the 1960s show it installed on the back of Boilermaker Special III. It was later installed on the front of Boilermaker Special IV in 1979. This headlight was not used Boilermaker Special VI or VIII and has been archived.

Some parts of Boilermaker Special III were saved before it was scrapped. The locomotive headlight's parabolic reflector and trim were installed in a new headlight box and placed at the front of Boilermaker Special V, then transferred to a new headlight box and installed on Boilermaker Special VII. The single-flute steam whistle, which was installed in the 1980s, was transferred to the Boilermaker Special V then to Boilermaker VII as well. Sheetmetal bearing the painted words "Purdue" and "Boilermaker Special" were saved and archived. Finally, a heavy brass plaque, which was installed inside the cab above the windshield to commemorate the 1960 dedication of the Boilermaker Special III, was removed and archived.

The chassis and drive train of Boilermaker Special V were scrapped, while the body was modified and restored and became the body of Boilermaker Special VII.

The cowcatcher from the BMS V is on display in the Purdue Boilermaker Station Welcome Center.

== Operation and maintenance ==
Although it is owned by Purdue University and the State of Indiana, the Boilermaker Special has been operated, maintained, and funded by the members of the Purdue Reamer Club since the mascot's introduction in 1940. The club's membership consists entirely of independent Purdue students (those who are not members of a social fraternity or sorority) who represent a wide cross-section of the student body. Within the Reamer Club, a Boilermaker Special Chairperson and a separate X-tra Special Chairperson are elected each semester to oversee the operation and maintenance of the mascots. Only men and women of the Reamer Club may serve as Pilots (engineers) or Co-pilots (firemen) for the mascots after passing a rigorous training period. The Boilermaker Special is frequently seen around the main campus, at athletic contests, and at local community events where it is used to promote the university. From May through August, it can also be seen around the state of Indiana in various parades and festivals. It spreads school spirit by blowing its train whistle and horn. It also has an external sound system that plays family-friendly music. The members of the Purdue Reamer Club travel with the train to nearly every football game, including bowl games. During the football season, caps bearing the logos of defeated opponents are attached to the Boilermaker Special's cow-catcher.

== See also ==
Similar vehicular mascots at other universities:

- The Ramblin' Wreck from Georgia Tech - A 1930 Ford Model A Sport Coupe which serves as the official mascot of the student body at the Georgia Institute of Technology
- The Sooner Schooner - A pioneer wagon and a symbol of the University of Oklahoma
- Toastrack, a 1929 Dennis G-type "toastrack" charabanc run by the students at Southampton University.
- Jezebel, a 1916 Dennis N-type maintained by the students of the Royal College of Science of Imperial College London
- Clementine, a 1926 Morris truck operated by the students of the Royal School of Mines of Imperial College London
- Boanerges, a 1902 James and Browne Car operated by the students of the City and Guilds College of Imperial College London
- Derrick, a 1926 Ner-a-Car Model C operated by the students of the City and Guilds College of Imperial College London
