= The Jokers =

1967 British comedy film by Michael Winner

- Original film poster
- Directed by: Michael Winner
- Written by: Dick Clement; Ian La Frenais
- Story by: Michael Winner
- Produced by: Ben Arbeid; Maurice Foster
- Starring: Oliver Reed; Michael Crawford; Harry Andrews; Michael Hordern; Gabriella Licudi
- Cinematography: Ken Hodges
- Edited by: Bernard Gribble
- Music by: Johnny Pearson
- Production companies: Gildor Films; Scimitar Films
- Distributed by: Rank Organisation
- Release date: 15 May 1967
- Running time: 94 minutes
- Country: United Kingdom
- Language: English
- Budget: £300,000 or £257,419

The Jokers is a 1967 British comedy film directed by Michael Winner and starring Michael Crawford and Oliver Reed. It was written by Dick Clement and Ian La Frenais. Two brothers hatch a plot to steal the Crown Jewels.

== Plot ==
Michael Tremayne is booted out of Sandhurst. He and his brother David want to do something "big". They decide to commit a crime as a "grand gesture". The brothers take Inge, David's new inamorata, on a tour of London, including the Tower of London. At a dinner party they learn that you cannot be charged with theft unless you intend to permanently deprive the owner of their property. David proposes stealing the crown jewels and sending letters out beforehand, showing they aren't intending to permanently deprive. Michael is somewhat jealous of David, as David is considered the 'good' son and him the 'bad' son. They write and deliver the letters. They plant a bomb at the Albert Memorial and observe the police procedure. Next they put a bomb at the lion cage at the London zoo. Then they blow up a ladies lavatory. David gets a laser. They put a bomb at the stock exchange and David goes to the army base, and using a tape recorder records the procedures.

Finally the day comes. Michael goes to the jewel room in the Tower and hides a bomb there. David and Michael go to the base and tie up the duty officer. They take the place of the bomb disposal expert and his assistant. They ride with the army to the Tower. The pair go into the bomb room and knock out the rather silly Colonel who went in with them and who commands the army base. David and Michael have had the alarms turned off, due to the danger of "vibration", and use the laser to cut into the cabinets and steal the Crown Jewels. The pair set off a small bomb and a smoke bomb. They stagger out pretending to be hurt, then escape from the ambulance taking them to hospital along with the jewels.

A worldwide search is undertaken for the robbers. David and Michael enjoy the media frenzy. One week after the robbery on 23 June 1967, the letters are opened and delivered to the police. When they go to get the jewels from their hiding place they are not there. The police arrive to arrest David. Michael says he doesn't know anything about the robbery. Michael never delivered his letter. David is identified as the bomb expert, but the witnesses can't identify Michael. The police investigate, but can't break down Michael's alibi of being at a party. Michael is released. David is indicted and bail is refused. The police set up a plan to make Michael think his alibi is breaking down, but Michael evades police surveillance. We then see him digging up the jewels from where he buried them at Stonehenge. Michael calls on a telephone he knows is tapped to say he's returning the jewels at Trafalgar Square at 4 a.m. The police set up a cordon, but Michael uses their concentration on the square to put the jewels in the scales of justice on top of the Old Bailey. We close with both brothers imprisoned in the Tower, plotting their escape.

== Cast ==
- Michael Crawford as Michael Tremayne
- Oliver Reed as David Tremayne
- Harry Andrews as Superintendent Marryatt
- James Donald as Colonel Gurney-Simms
- Daniel Massey as Riggs
- Michael Hordern as Sir Matthew
- Gabriella Licudi as Eve
- Lotte Tarp as Inge
- Frank Finlay as harassed man
- Warren Mitchell as Lennie
- Rachel Kempson as Mrs. Tremayne
- Peter Graves as Mr. Tremayne
- Ingrid Boulting as Sarah
- Brian Wilde as Sergeant Catchpole
- Edward Fox as Lieutenant Sprague
- Michael Goodliffe as Lieutenant Colonel Paling

== Production ==
The film was shot on location in London over nine weeks in the summer of 1966. Filming started on 23 June 1966.

Included is a short sequence of Jezebel, a 1916 Dennis N-Type fire engine that is owned and run by the Royal College of Science Union at Imperial College London.

== Critical reception ==
The Monthly Film Bulletin wrote: "the fun is always good-humoured and the playing never drops into caricature. In fact a cast which reads like a minor "Who's Who in the Theatre" gets some unusually good opportunities, with James Donald in particular giving a marvellously deadpan obtuseness to the publicity-conscious Colonel of the bomb disposal unit. ... Michael Crawford as the younger brother is his usual relaxed and nonchalant self, and Oliver Reed has found a useful comic line by imposing a Bogarde-ish smoothness on to his characteristically tough exterior. Michael Winner keeps it all moving at a suitably lively pace and provides several nice touches of visual wit, but he is not quite able to sustain the change of mood when the joke seems in danger of turning sour."

Bosley Crowther in The New York Times wrote, "ANOTHER of those wonderfully eccentric British crime comedies, to compare with such whoppers as "The League of Gentlemen, Private's Progress and The Lavender Hill Mob, has popped up in Universal's The Jokers, which came to the Sutton yesterday. And right away its young director, Michael Winner, justifies his name."

The Radio Times Guide to Films gave the film 3/5 stars, writing: "Michael Crawford and Oliver Reed are well cast as brothers who attempt to steal the Crown Jewels just for the heck of it in this light-hearted romp. It's a quintessential "Swinging London" movie, full of nice locations and ever-so-British attitudes. The Dick Clement/lan La Frenais screenplay was virtually director-proof and was entrusted to Michael Winner, who does a decent job of it, making it seem regrettable that he ever veered away from comedy."

Leslie Halliwell said: "Bright suspense comedy which sums up the swinging London era pretty well and is generally amusing though it finally lacks aplomb."
