= Ethel Luis =

Irish chemist and pharmacist (1862-1904)

- Born: Ethel Margaret Luis; 28 August 1898
- Died: 30 May 1998 (aged 99); Broughty Ferry
- Citizenship: British
- Education: Royal Holloway College; Royal College of Science, Imperial College; University of St Andrews
- Known for: Chemist
- Scientific career
- Fields: Chemistry
- Workplaces: University of Dundee

Ether Margaret Luis (28 August 1898 – 30 May 1998) was a Scottish chemist who was one of the first women appointed to the chemistry staff of the University of Dundee during the Second World War.

== Early life and education ==
Luis was born in 1898 in Dundee, Scotland. Her father Theo G. Lewis was a spinner and manufacturer with Bloomfield, Dundee.

Luis was educated at Royal Holloway College from 1918 to 1921, obtaining a BSc, Honours.

She is also listed as attending Imperial College at the Royal College of Science, before returning to Scotland to obtain her PhD from the University of St. Andrews in 1931.

== Professional career ==
Luis worked at the University of Dundee from 1929 to 1941 and became a chemistry demonstrator in 1938.

She published nine research papers, as author and co-author.

In 1939, at the outbreak of the Second World War, Luis was promoted to Assistant Lecturer. This role was terminated at the end of the war in 1945 when the male faculty returned from their war duties.

== Selected publications ==
- The isomeric mandelohydrazones of benzoin, Journal of the Chemical Society, 1941, p.647-652

== Later life ==
Luis died in 1998 at the age of 99. Little more is known about her life and works.
