= Imperial College Union =

Students' union of Imperial College London

- Institution: Imperial College London
- Location: South Kensington; London, SW7
- Established: 1910; 116 years ago
- Sabbatical officers: Daniel Zhuo (President) Sarah Azam (DP Welfare); Jacob Eyre (DP Education) Sky Wang (DP Activities)
- Members: c. 22,000 total
- Website: www.imperialcollegeunion.org

Imperial College Union is the students' union of Imperial College London. It is host to varied societies and has student bars situated around Albertopolis. The Union is based in the north wing of the Beit Quadrangle on Prince Consort Road.

== History ==
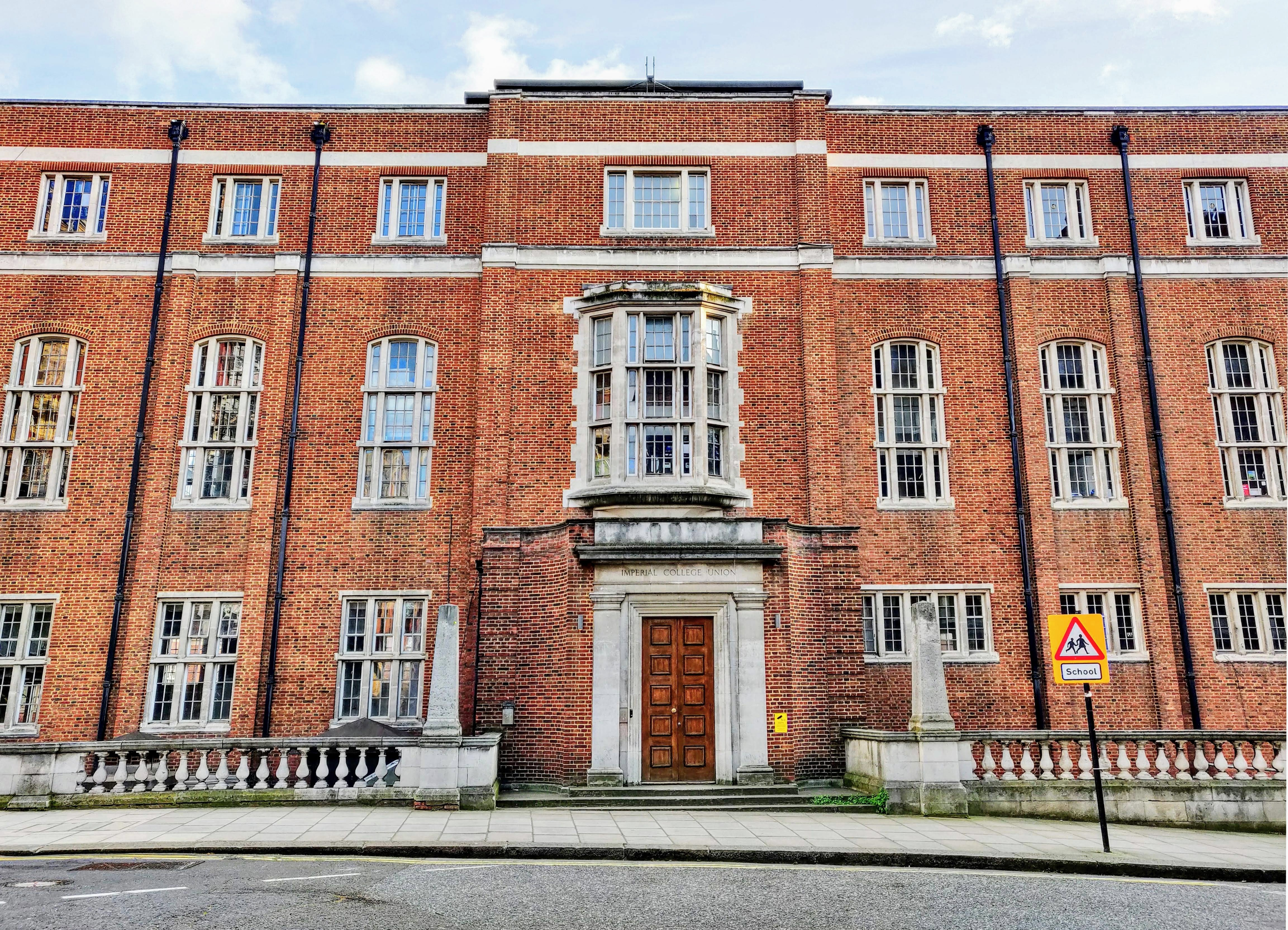
Union Building from Kensington Gore

The establishment of a students' union was recognised with the construction of the north building of Beit Quad in 1910-11 designed by Sir Aston Webb. The original idea for the building came from Sir Arthur Acland, a member of the governing body, who saw the need for a place for students to congregate and develop a collegiate social life.

=== Timeline ===
- 1907 Formation of Imperial College of Science and Technology incorporating the Royal School of Mines, the Royal College of Science and City and Guilds College
- 1910 Imperial College Union formed by approval of the College's Governing Body
- 1911 The Union building in South Kensington is constructed
- 1922 Founder member of NUS (leaves for the first time in 1923)
- 1949 Felix newspaper is founded
- 1969 First directly elected sabbatical President
- 1970 Queen has their first London performance in the Union
- 1984 The Union starts catering operation
- 1985 The Union Starts running own bars
- 1987 First professional welfare advisor at the Union
- 1988 Imperial College School of Medicine is established at St. Mary’s
- 1996 Union Council is made the supreme governing body
- 1997 Union stops running bookshop on campus.
- 1997 First medical student to be elected President (Andy Heeps)
- 1998 First Deputy President (Education & Welfare) Sabbatical
- 1998 Imperial College School of Medicine merges with Charing Cross and Royal Postgraduate Medical schools
- 2000 Merger with Wye College and Kennedy Institute
- 2001 Sir Richard Sykes appointed Rector of Imperial College
- 2003 College adopts Faculty structure in place of constituent Colleges.
- 2004 College rebrands as "Imperial College, London"
- 2005 Union Building Redevelopment – Project starts
- 2005 First Deputy President (Graduate Students) at the Union.
- 2006 Union Building Redevelopment – Construction work starts
- 2007 Imperial College Centenary
- 2007 The Union rejoins the NUS (again)
- 2007 Imperial College leaves the University of London
- 2008 The Union leaves the NUS
- 2009 First Deputy President (Education) and Deputy President (Welfare)
- 2021 Major refurbishment of the Union Concert Hall which added raked seating

=== Relationship with the NUS ===
Imperial College Union is most noted for the history of its relationship with the National Union of Students (NUS). Despite being involved in the founding of the NUS in 1922, Imperial College Union withdrew its membership of the NUS a year later. Since then, Imperial College Union spent long periods outside the NUS, interspersed with brief periods of membership. A referendum for NUS affiliation held in 2002 was overwhelmingly rejected by members of the Imperial College Union with 72% in favour of remaining out of the NUS.

In November 2006, after 30 years of not being part of the NUS, a petition proposed a debate to affiliate with NUS at Freshers' Fair 2006 collected 617 valid signatures, from just above the 5% minimum of Imperial College Union members necessary to call a referendum. A referendum was held between 14 and 16 November 2006, which resulted in NUS affiliation with 53.26% for to 46.74% against and a turn-out of over 30%.

After the failure of governance reform measures supported by Imperial College Union at the NUS conference in 2008, the union council voted in favour of holding a referendum on disaffiliation from the NUS. The resulting referendum showed that the Members of Imperial College Union decided that their Union should no longer affiliate to the National Union of Students.

=== Queen Heritage ===
The British band Queen performed their first London gig in the Union Concert Hall) on 18 July 1970, Brian May having been a post-graduate student at Imperial College London. The PRS website quotes May as follows:

The first proper gig we did was at Imperial College in the Union Hall. I remember it very distinctly because I’d seen all sorts of people playing in there. I’d been part of the Entertainment Committee and we booked a group every Saturday night in those days. People like Spooky Tooth and Steamhammer! We booked Jimi Hendrix too. So for us it was a dream come true to actually play on that stage. It used to get packed in there so it was a major stepping stone for us.

== Organisation ==
The Union is influenced by a variety of democratically elected representatives who sit on Union committees, control Union resources and represent the views of students to the College and external bodies. The Union is led by officers who act as representatives to the 14,900 Union members. The most senior officers are the five officer trustees who work full-time for the Union on a variety of areas ranging from commercial services to campaigns and representation. These officers are supported by 35 full-time and up to 250 part-time staff, and the 2,600 elected officers of the Union's 320+ clubs and societies.

In 2013, the Union successfully registered as a charity.

=== Constituent Union Structure ===
There are five constituent unions which run as constituent parts of the Union. These are largely historical in origin and retain many traditions, such as their names when most of the actual faculties now have different names. Some represent the students in their respective faculties: the City and Guilds College Union (for engineers), the Royal College of Science Union (for scientists) and the Imperial College School of Medicine Students' Union (for medical students). They are all run by part-time officers elected from the student body, with the exception of the Medical Union President, who is an elected full-time sabbatical officer with a one-year tenure.

In 2002 the Royal School of Mines Union was absorbed into the City and Guilds College Union and became a clubs & societies committee. However, in 2012 after running autonomously from City and Guilds Union for many years, The Royal School of Mines regained its constituent union status, solely looking after the social aspects of its students.

In the same governance review of 2012, Silwood Park Students' Union and the Graduate Students' Association (representing all postgraduate students) also became a constituent union. The Silwood Park Union operates largely independently from the overall Union but has no part or full-time sabbatical leadership. Following a postgraduate engagement review in 2022, the Graduate Students' Association was dissolved by Union Council.

== Clubs, volunteering projects and societies ==
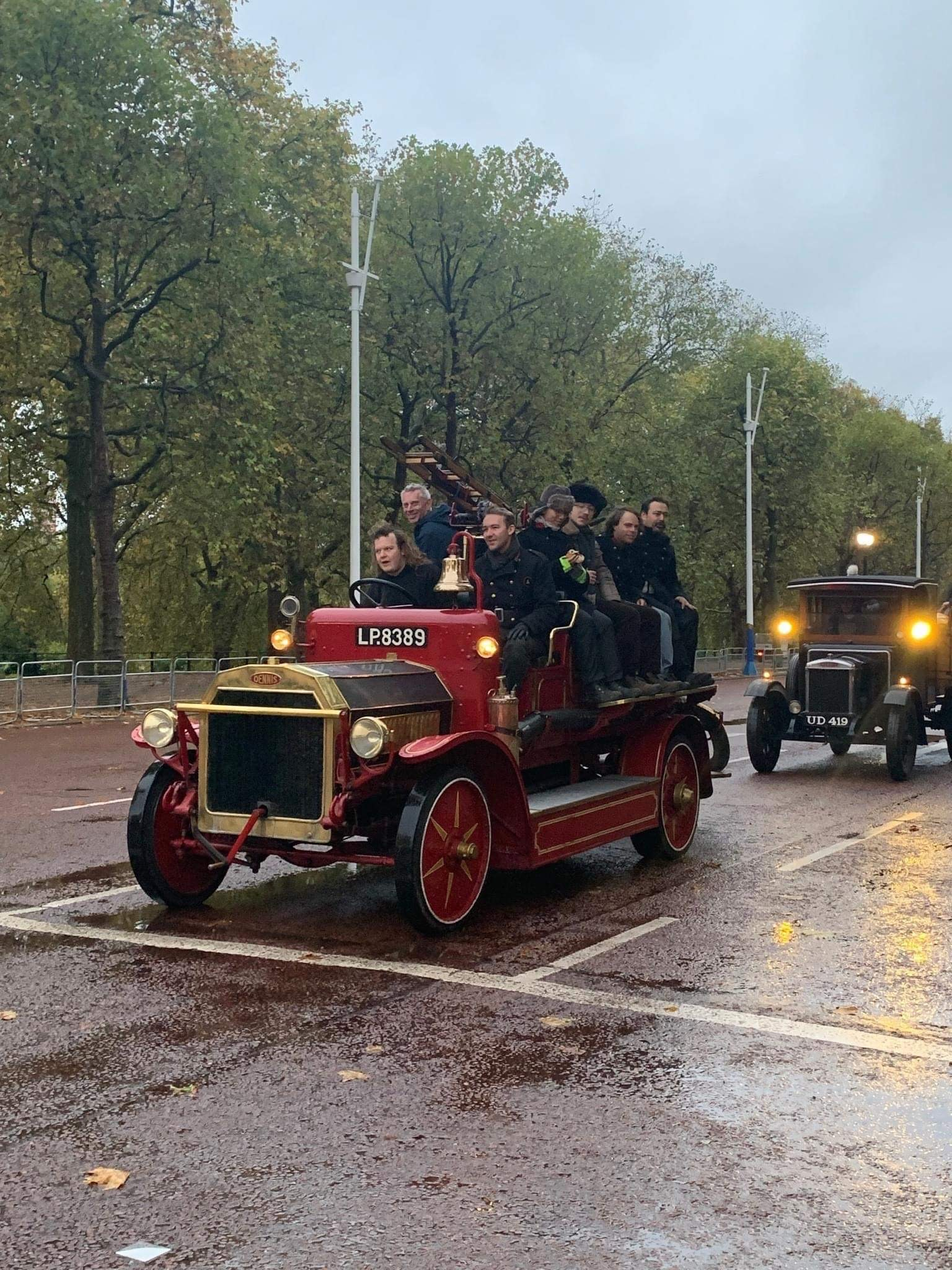
Jezebel Dennis I of the Royal College of Science (RCS) Motor Club and Clementine Morris II of the Royal School of Mines (RSM) Motor Club taking part as spectators during RM Sotheby's London-Brighton Veteran Car Run 2022.

Imperial College Union has a large number of student-led clubs, volunteering projects and societies (known as CSPs), with over 350 in total. Funding for CSPs at Imperial College Union is significant, taking up a sizeable portion of the Union's annual subvention provided by Imperial College London, though many clubs supplement this with sponsorship from outside of the Union.

CSPs at Imperial College Union are administered by the Activities Forum, who deal with the majority of procedural issues and who are responsible for representing the clubs within their care to Imperial College Union. Clubs are then grouped and fall under smaller organisational boards (e.g. the Athletics Clubs Committee handles the sports clubs).

Examples of notable student groups are Project Nepal which sends Imperial College students to work on educational development in rural Nepal and the El Salvador Project, a construction based project in Central America. Other societies include sports-related societies, such as Imperial College Boat Club and Imperial College Gliding Club; music societies such as Imperial College A Capella; social societies such as the Imperial College Debating Society. Each department also has its own departmental society. Imperial College also owns a mountain hut in Snowdonia, Wales, which it lets clubs use free of charge.

Imperial College Union also has three motor clubs which each represent three of the Constituent Unions: Royal School of Mines, Royal College of Science and City and Guilds College Union. These are the RCS Motor Club, the RSM Motor Club and Team Bo and each look after the motorised mascot for each Constituent Union. The RCS Motor Club looks after Jezebel Dennis I which is a 1916 Dennis N-Type Fire Engine, the RSM Motor Club looks after Clementine Morris II which is a 1926 Morris T-Type one-tonne truck and Team Bo' looks after Boanerges II and Derrick I which are a 1902 James and Browne Veteran Car and a 1926 Ner-a-car motorcycle respectively. Almost no other University in the UK has societies as unique as this which makes Imperial College Union rather unique.

=== Minibus Fleet ===
Currently, the Union owns a fleet of 2 Peugeot Boxer and 2 Ford Transit minibuses as well as a Volkswagen Amarok pick-up truck all of which are available for clubs to hire. Both of the transits have aftermarket roof racks and one of them is converted to a 9 seater minibus to accommodate trips to continental Europe while the Amarok has a tow bar for CSPs that require one. Formerly, the Union used to own a fleet of 15 Ford Transit minibuses and sometimes the odd Land Rover. Minibus hire prices can be found on Imperial College Union's website.

==== Controversies ====
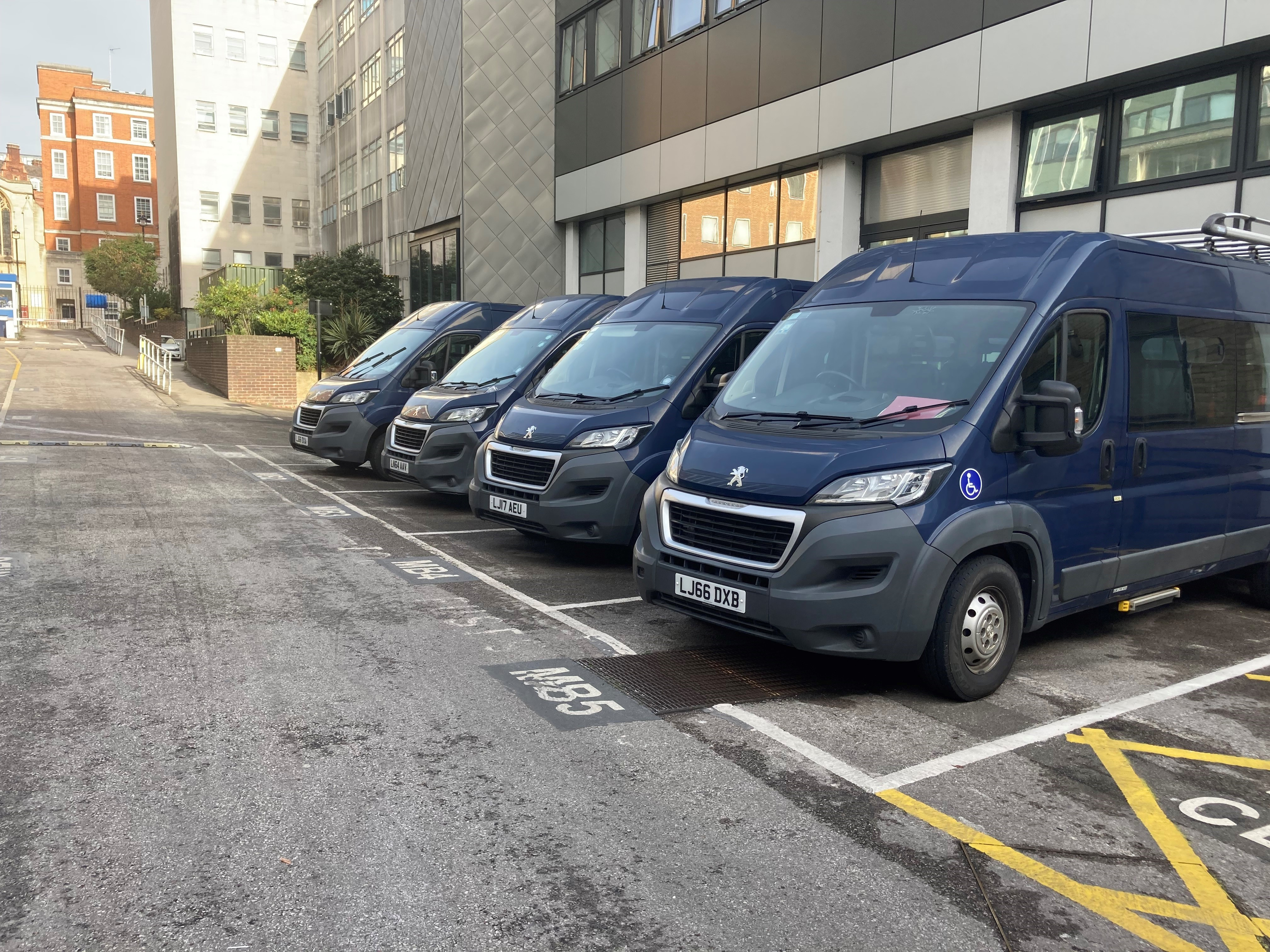
4 of Imperial College Union's Peugeot Boxer minibuses

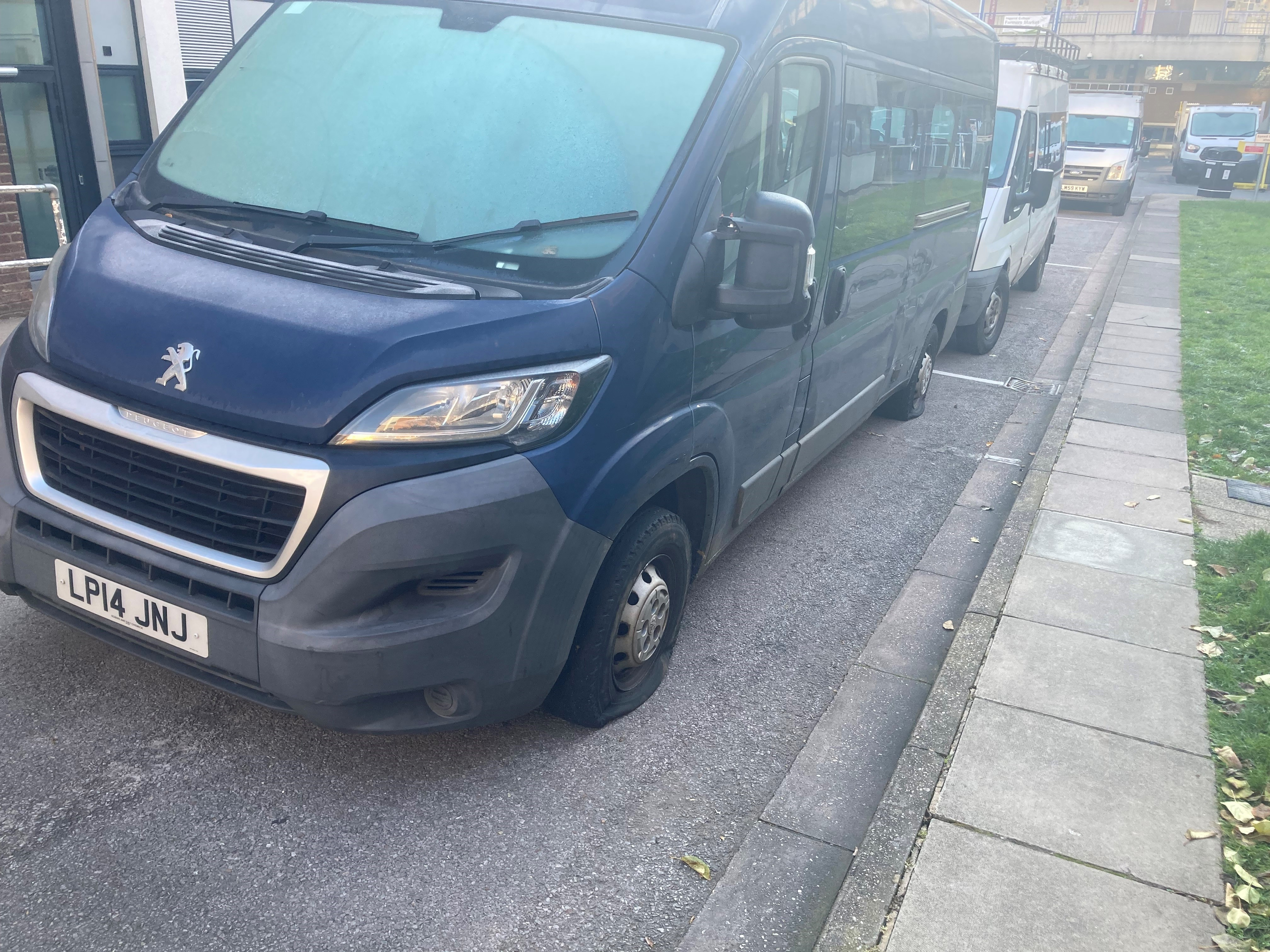
The Union's Minibus fleet as of December 2022.

The subject of minibuses has often been a big source of controversy for Imperial College Union over the years. For example, in Felix Issue 985 from January 1994 it was noted that a minibus was involved in a hit-and-run incident over the previous Xmas break. This same minibus was also involved in an accident over the summer holiday of 1993 and it was since found abandoned and burned out although it wasn't entirely certain if the number plates had been swapped and used on a different vehicle. It later transpired in Felix Issue 987 that the ownership of the vehicle had reverted back to the insurers and the remains were sold on to a salvage merchant. According to Kent CID, it was later revealed that the minibus remains were sold to a buyer who gave false details. Subsequent owners of the minibus failed to register the vehicle properly and so the authorities could only trace the vehicle back to the Union.

In February 2008, a minibus being hired by the IC Canoe Club was rear-ended by a mercedes-benz car. This resulted in extensive damage to the minibus and a passenger in the mercedes-benz was taken to hospital. The minibus had to be off-roaded and the fleet was depleted in numbers as a result.

In late 2022, it transpired that 4 of the Union's Peugeot Boxer minibuses had outstanding and unresolved safety recalls since late 2019. The source of the recall was the brake pipes in all Peugeot Boxers manufactured between 2016 and 2019 potentially not meeting or conforming to safety requirements and questions were being asked about whether the Union had competent enough permanent staff members in its Student Activities Team to look after such a fleet. Given that this made up just under half of the remaining minibuses in the fleet, many CSP bookings were severely disrupted and the future of the minibus fleet has remained uncertain since. A paper was eventually released by the Union's Finance and Risk (FAR) Committee which outlined the options being considered however this paper was branded as misleading because the mileages and condition of the minibuses were completely untrue. This paper can be found on the Union's website.

== Facilities ==
=== Bars ===
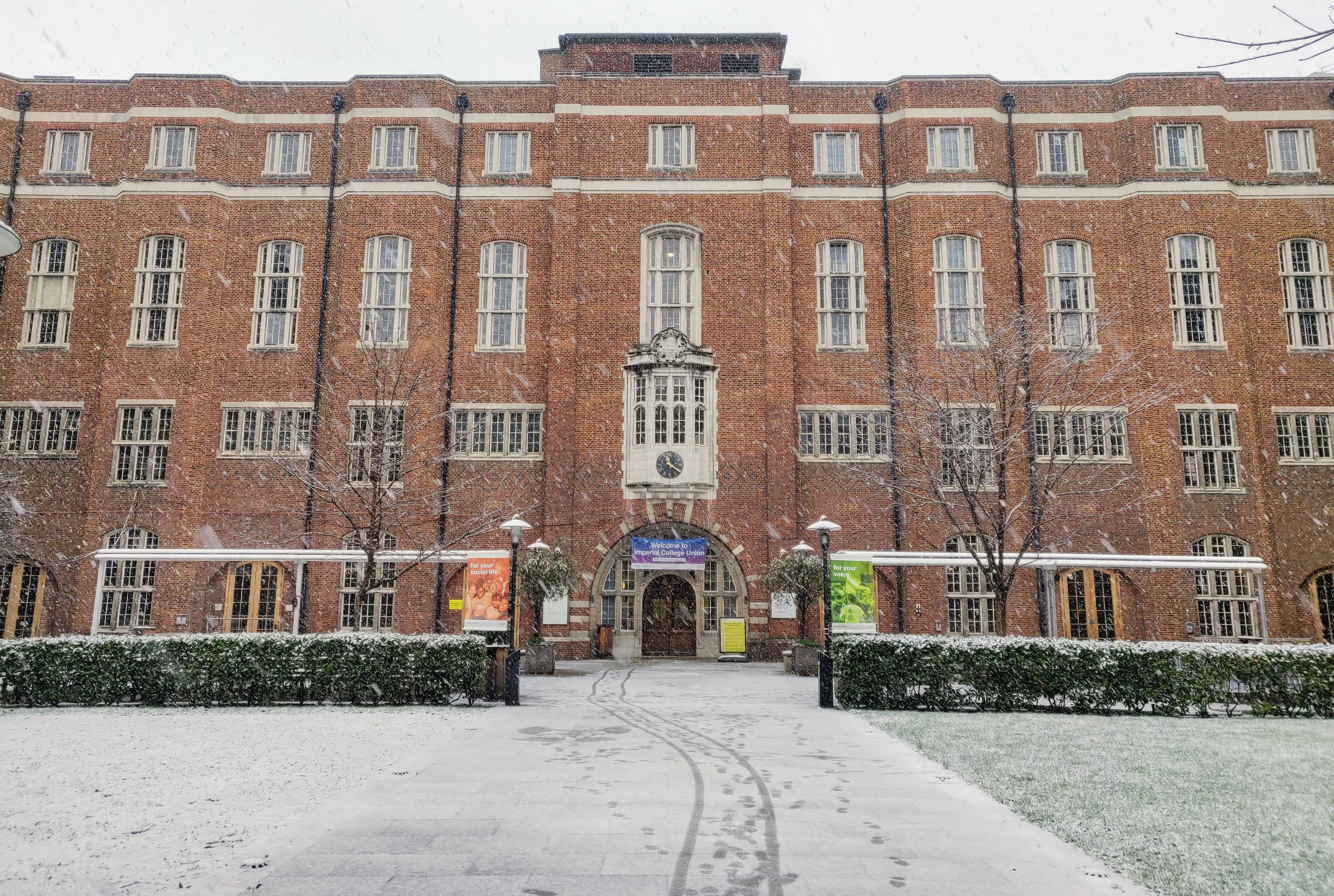
The Union Building forms the northern side of Beit Quad. The Union Bar, 568, and Metric are on the ground floor.

The main Union bars are located on the north side of the Beit Quadrangle. There are three:

- FiveSixEight is a bar serving food, with large screens often showing sports events or popular music channels.
- The Union Bar is a small wood-panelled bar, and has existed in its current form since 1956. The bar used to have a large selection of real ale and claims to boast the largest collection of pewter tankards in Europe, with some dating back to the early 20th century. Each tankard represents an officer of one of the clubs and only the current or former club officers are allowed to use their club's tankards.
- Metric is a nightclub which opened in November 2010. During term time, Metric often plays host to DJs or to live bands performing to the backdrop of an electronic lighting wall. During the summer Metric hosts some of the Proms Extra events (part of The Proms).

FiveSightEight and The Union Bar were both Cask Marque Accredited in 2017. As of September 2022 it has since expired.

The Union also runs the Reynolds Bar situated in Charing Cross Hospital, largely frequented by the students of Imperial College School of Medicine, and h-bar in Sherfield Building on the South Kensington campus, primarily advertised towards the postgraduate cohort.

The Silwood Park campus bar is operated by an external company, although students have pushed for a Union-run bar in recent years. The bar boasts Guinness and Stella Artois Cidre on tap and also has a small selection of bottled ales and ciders. Three flavors of crisps are available to feed hungry patrons. The bar television almost exclusively shows The Big Bang Theory, and there is a small stereo in the main room which students can hook up to their own musical collections if desired.

==== Controversies ====
The Venues and Bars have not been without their fair share of controversies. In November 2019, the FiveSixEight kitchen was closed for two weeks due to serious health and safety concerns. These concerns stemmed from an overloading of the circuit board which powered various kitchen appliances. A member of staff got an electric shock in the kitchens at roughly the same time. This resulted in questions being asked about the general health and safety of the Union's itself. The Union's kitchen received a food standards rating of 2/5 following an inspection in August of that year by a local council Environmental Health Officer (EHO). The officer found mice in the bar and cockroaches in the kitchen which managed to get in via cracks around the edges in the buildings as a result of age. The kitchen didn't reopen until January 2020, and eventually received a food standard rating of 5/5 in November 2021.

A group of 22 staff members were fired after making it onto the roof of the Beit building via a route which was deemed precarious following a leaving drinks event for one of the ex-staff members who had just left on 7 November 2021. The roof was accessible via a window which had a broken restrictor and thus it could be fully opened with a person able to fit through. This whole ordeal only came about to the Union's full attention as a result of a complaint submitted due to alleged racist comments on a WhatsApp group chat used by bar staff members to discuss work related topics. The consequences of the sackings resulted in 22 people (some of whom were duty bar managers) being fired, the staff members in question having their Union memberships stripped for a few months and the venues suddenly finding themselves with a serious staff shortage.

=== Theatre ===
Imperial College Union has a theatre located in the Union Concert Hall (UCH) which is found on the second floor of the Main Union Building, Beit Quad. The majority of performances are put on by the student societies of Imperial College, ranging from serious drama through to Gilbert & Sullivan Marathons. The space is shared with the Imperial College Dramatic Society and Imperial Cinema and other student societies as a multipurpose space. The theatre has a fly tower with a selection of lighting and fly bars, the venue has lectriflex, DMX and sound & comms multicore installed throughout.

In the Summer of 2014 the Union Concert Hall underwent an extensive redevelopment after a grant was awarded to do so. In early 2015, the Dramatic Society installed a considerable amount of new cabling which will make the venue even more useful to anyone who wishes to use it.

=== Cinema ===
Imperial College Union has a student run Cinema located in the Union Concert Hall, in Beit Hall. The Cinema is considered a club under the Arts & Entertainments Board, however provides a service to members and non-members.

The cinema is a professionally equipped cinema with a 33 ft screen, Dolby Digital surround sound system, Kinoton (35mm) and Barco (Digital) projectors and seats up to 200. Pre-show advertisements are provided by Pearl & Dean.

=== Redevelopment of the Union Building ===
As of August 2006, £2.2 million had been raised out of the total £6 million required for the redevelopment of the Union wing of Beit Hall. All three phases of the building project were completed by 2011, including the full bar and nightclub refurbishment and the moving of the Union Gym to level 3 of the building.

== Former ICU Presidents and Sabbatical Officers ==
Notable former sabbaticals include:

- Piers Corbyn, President 1969-70.
- Trevor Phillips, President 1974-75
- Christopher Fox, Baron Fox, President 1980.
- Pallab Ghosh, Felix Editor 1983-84.
