= Union Concert Hall =

Concert hall in City of Westminster, London

Coordinates: 51.5000°N 0.1780°W

The Union Concert Hall is a concert hall in Beit Quadrangle of Imperial College, London, occupied by Imperial College Union. The room is part of the theatre installed within the building. It is home to Imperial College Union Cinema and the Imperial College Dramatic Society, and is a multi-purpose space used by clubs, societies and projects of Imperial College Union, and outside customers.

== Queen Heritage ==
The British band Queen performed their first London gig in the UCH on 18 July 1970, Brian May having been a post-graduate student at Imperial College London. The PRS website quotes May as follows:

The first proper gig we did was at Imperial College in the Union Hall. I remember it very distinctly because I’d seen all sorts of people playing in there. I’d been part of the Entertainment Committee and we booked a group every Saturday night in those days. People like Spooky Tooth and Steamhammer! We booked Jimi Hendrix too. So for us it was a dream come true to actually play on that stage. It used to get packed in there so it was a major stepping stone for us.

== Venue facilities ==
Facilities in the hall include Ethernet and DMX, a Service Loop and a large scaffold tower. The stage is raised from the floor level of the hall, and extends up two storeys, including a fly gallery with many fly-bars and electrically operated lighting bars.

The Hall also contains a large cinema screen which can be raised and lowered for the purpose of screening films. This is used by Imperial Cinema.
