= Royal College of Science Union =

Coordinates: 51°29′55.5″N 0°10′35.5″W

- Institution: Royal College of Science
- Location: South Kensington, London, England, United Kingdom
- Established: 1881
- President: Jack Swires
- Vice presidents: Jacob Eyre, Ilmi Rahman, Nazifa Islam, Sally Suchanek, Aldi Gabor, Begum Yener
- Honorary secretary: Isabella Sequeiros Egan
- Treasurer: Logan Brooks
- Members: c. 3,000
- Affiliations: Constituent Union of Imperial College Union
Colours
- Website: rcsu.org.uk

The Royal College of Science Union (RCSU) is a student union and science outreach organisation at Imperial College London which represents over 3,000 students in the university's Faculty of Natural Sciences. It manages the student societies for the departments of Mathematics, Physics, Chemistry, Biochemistry, Biology, and the Centre for Environmental Policy (CEP). The RCSU runs Science Challenge, a national science communication competition, and publishes the Broadsheet science magazine.

== History ==
The RCSU was founded in 1881, following the creation of the Royal College of Science in the same year. The RCS was established to support training of the non-Earth Sciences within the Royal School of Mines which had been founded in 1853 following the merger of the Royal College of Chemistry with the Government School of Mines and Science Applied to the Arts in 1853.

The RCSU was briefly disbanded for a few years in the early 2000s following the College's decision to split up the Sciences Faculty into separate Faculties of Physical and Life Sciences, with the RCSU at the time deciding to follow suit, splitting into the Physical Sciences Union and the Life Sciences Union. In 2006 however, following the College's decision to re-merge the faculties, the presidents of the two constituent unions, Kilian Frensch and Mariko Tavernier, proposed to re-merge the two student unions, with the new union named the Royal College of Science Union following a popular vote. The re-merged RCSU was first led jointly by Kilian Frensch and Mariko Tavernier for the remainder of the college year, before Jad Marrouche became its first sole president the following year.

== Science Challenge ==
The RCSU Science Challenge is a scientific writing competition created in 2006 by the presidents of the newly-reformed RCSU, Kilian Frensch and Mariko Tavernier. Initially only for students of Imperial College, from its second year it was expanded and made open to schools students from across the country. The competition invites notable science communicators to judge the entries, with recent judges including BBC News science correspondent Pallab Ghosh, physicist John Pendry and climatologist Brian Hoskins.

== Traditions ==
The RCSU has a number of traditions, including the chanting of the kangela at bar nights and the sport of mascotry, guarding a college mascot called Theta. Theta takes the form of a thermometer, chosen as an instrument used by all scientific disciplines. Theta has had a number of incarnations, with the current mascot, Theta Mk.IV being a seven-foot steel thermometer weighing over 100 pounds (45 kg).

The RCSU also keeps an 'inviolate mascot' (i.e. it cannot be stolen), which is a Dennis N-Type fire engine known as Jezebel. Built in 1916, 'Jez' was donated to the college in 1955 when she finished her working life, and is equipped with 9-litre engine capable of pumping around 500 gallons of water per minute. There is a dedicated RCS Motor Club which maintains and takes care of Jezebel. She is involved with charity work and appears at various motor shows.

== Kangela ==
The Kangela is reputed to be an ancient Swahili Fertility Chant [Royal College of Science Handbook, 1973] first adopted by the RCSU in the middle 1950s as a War Cry on the occasion of Morphy Day.

The words are as follows:

Kangela Armadola
Kangela Armadola
Kangela Armadola
Teia, Teia, Teia,
Pakamisso, Pakamisso,
Inkangala, Kubinala,
Watsi, R.C.S.

The word kangela means "to watch" in Zulu.

== See also ==
- City and Guilds College Union
- History of Imperial College London
