= Purdue Pete =

Athletics Mascot of Purdue University

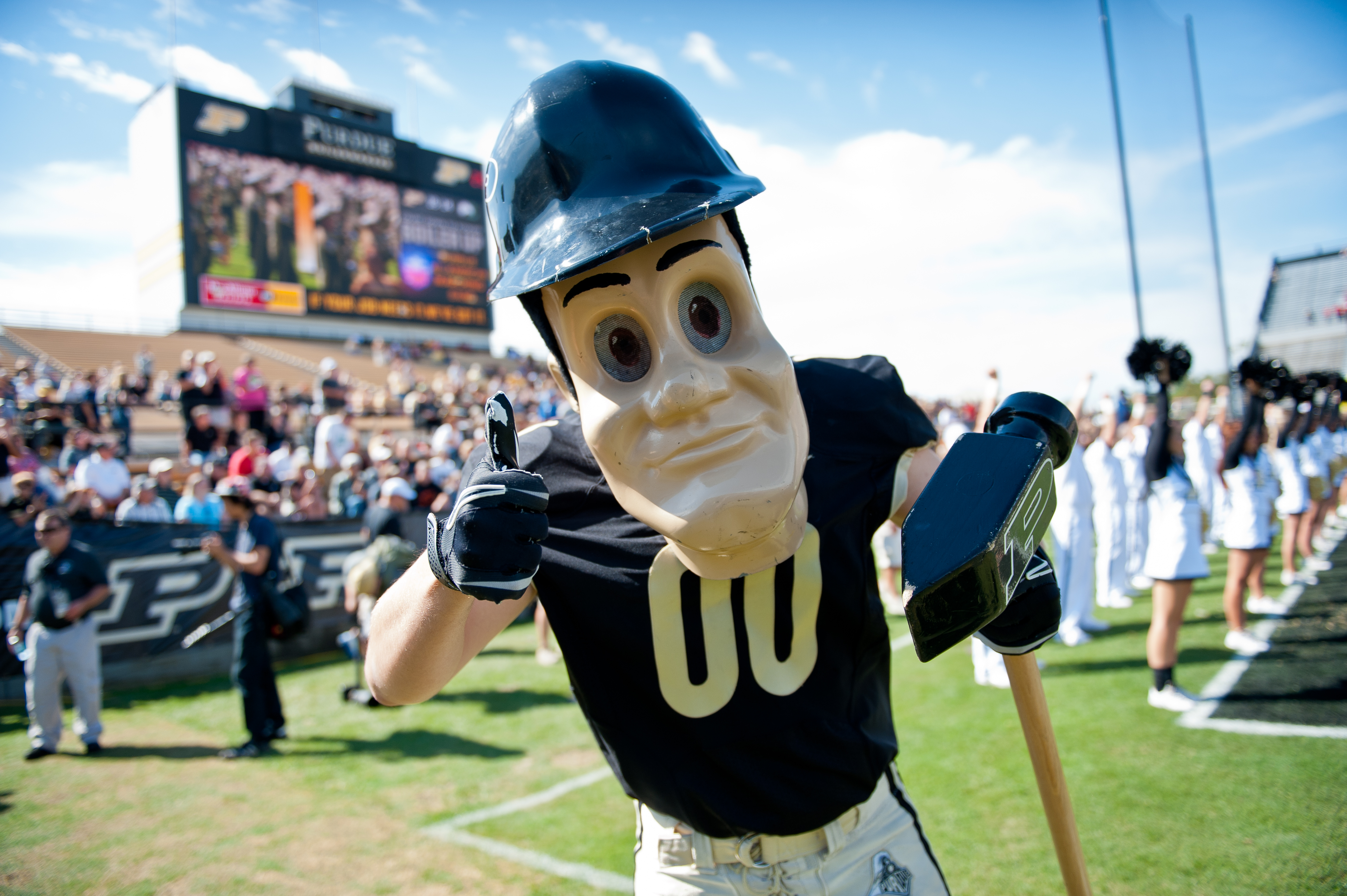
- Purdue Pete at a Purdue football game
- University: Purdue University
- Conference: Big Ten
- First seen: 1940
- Related mascot(s): Boilermaker Special

Purdue Pete is a mascot of Purdue University. Despite his on-field presence at Purdue sporting events, Pete is only an athletic mascot of the university. The official mascot of Purdue University is the Boilermaker Special.

Purdue Pete was first designed as a logo by the University Bookstore in 1940.

In the summer of 1940, Robert “Doc” Epple borrowed $10,000 from his father to invest as part owner of the University Bookstore. Doc had just graduated from Purdue and he and his partner, Red Simmons, decided their business should have a logo. They commissioned Art Evans to create it. Carl Verplank was the model for the caricature he created. Carl weighed 210 pounds and ran the 100 yard dash under 10 seconds. The bookstore would use the character on their products and portray him dressed up in different clothes for the different majors. The owners of the bookstores gave him the name “Pete”; no one today knows why this was chosen to be his name. He was given a physical identity in 1956 as he came out and helped the students cheer at a pep rally. Over the years, the appearance of Purdue Pete has gone under several drastic changes as well as several minor changes. His original head was made of paper-mâché, pasted onto a chicken wire frame. This was very inconvenient for the person who would be underneath because it would limit his movements, yet he was still expected to move around and do stunts. This head was changed to a giant fiberglass head where the person inside would use a harness to support it. This was impractical due to the sheer size of it. In the 1980s, Purdue Pete acquired the appearance he is now associated with. Proposals to switch to a soft-sculpture costume were rejected in 2006 and 2011.

From 1997 to 2007, Purdue Pete had a sidekick named Rowdy. Rowdy was a ten-foot-tall inflatable mascot who represented a young "future Boilermaker". He was the idea of Jan Winger, Purdue's administrative assistant of athletic public relations, who was inspired by Nebraska's Lil' Red.

== Design ==
Purdue Pete's uniforms are old gold and black, which are Purdue's school colors. Purdue Pete carries a large hammer, reminiscent of the type of large mallets used to mold steel by boilermakers. The current head utilizes a fiberglass frame, but is much smaller and lighter than previous designs, as it is made primarily of a composite. The newest head of Pete was designed and created by students in the Aeronautical Engineering Technology department. This is also the same department that designed the Boilermaker X-tra Special. They make several heads throughout the year, as well as repairing any damage done during regular use. When the department gives the heads to the four Purdue Pete students, the heads are covered in the flesh-colored paint. It is up to the four people who portray Purdue Pete to paint the eyes and glue on the hair.

=== 2011 proposed redesign ===
Purdue Pete in 1955 (left), 1969 (right)
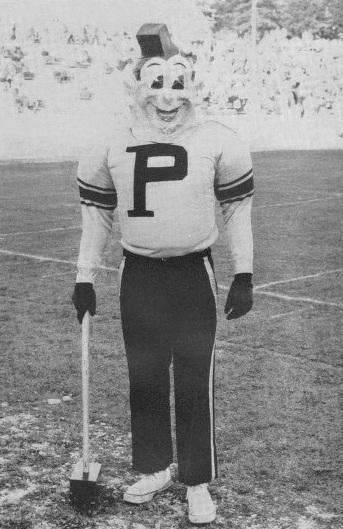
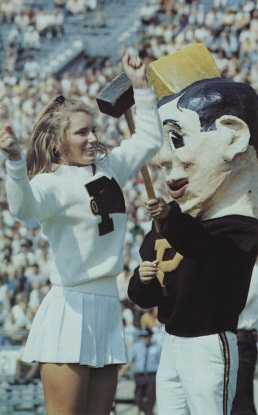

Purdue attempted to redesign Purdue Pete's costume due to concerns that the over-sized head was perceived as scary by younger fans, as well as the transfer of the original designer and fabricator of the Purdue Pete heads, Professor Raymond Thompson, to Dubai Aerospace University. However, the redesign was met with outrage and criticism. Former Purdue Pete actor and 2008 graduate John Langenkamp criticized the full body suit for being potentially very uncomfortable, and being too drastic a visual change from the previous design. Longtime John Purdue Club donor and member Bill Donovan kept most of his donations earmarked for Purdue Pete, but chose not to contribute more after the redesign of Purdue Pete. The redesign plans for Purdue Pete involve no jersey, a full body suit rather than just a head, and no hammer. At the spring 2011 Black & Gold game, despite a 67-yard field goal by junior Carson Wiggs, the loudest fan reaction was to boo the redesigned mascot. On April 13, 2011, Purdue decided to restore the old Purdue Pete mascot design.

== Function ==
Purdue Pete goes to all of the football games, and the home basketball games, as well as the tournaments such as the Big Ten Bowl Games and the NCAA. Purdue Pete also makes appearances at softball, soccer, and baseball home games. He performs skits during the games, such as a surfing skit where the audience lies down on the ground, allowing Pete to ride a surfboard over top of them. The students who portray Purdue Pete also do stunts of their own creation. This allows them to put their own touches into the performance. It typically takes about ten minutes to get completely dressed up before the games. Purdue Pete wears a basketball jersey to the basketball games and is fully decked out with football jersey and pads for the football games. He also wears his football outfit as his main clothing of choice. Besides games, Purdue Pete also goes to numerous social events. He has been to grand-openings for companies around the West Lafayette area. He goes to tailgates before games and special alumni events. Although the football outfit is his main clothing style, he can wear other things for special appearances, such as a tuxedo at a banquet to welcome the at-the-time new president of Purdue, France A. Córdova.

== Eligibility ==
According to Arthur Smith, a spirit coordinator, "essentially anyone could be Purdue Pete", although the people who have been chosen to be Purdue Pete in the past have all been about six feet tall and weighed around one hundred and sixty pounds. Hundreds of people try out to be Purdue Pete, but only the four most qualified students are chosen in order to distribute the time and effort required. In order to keep the role of Purdue Pete, students have to pass drug tests and physicals and must maintain at least a 2.0 GPA. They are also required to go to study hall for about four hours a week. A professor has never been Purdue Pete, although there have been some requests to be Pete for a day for the experience of it.
