= Royal College of Science Association =

The Royal College of Science Association (RCSA) was set up in 1908 and is a Chapter under the Imperial College Association umbrella comprising the former students from the Departments of Biochemistry, Biology, Chemistry, Maths and Physics (collectively termed the "Royal College of Science") at Imperial College London.

The first President was the author H. G. Wells, whose books include The Time Machine and War of the Worlds.
