= RCS Motor Club =

The Royal College of Science Motor Club was set up in 1955 to maintain "Jezebel", a 1916 Dennis N-Type fire engine and a mascot of the students of the Royal College of Science, one of the founding three colleges of Imperial College London, in South Kensington.

== Jezebel ==
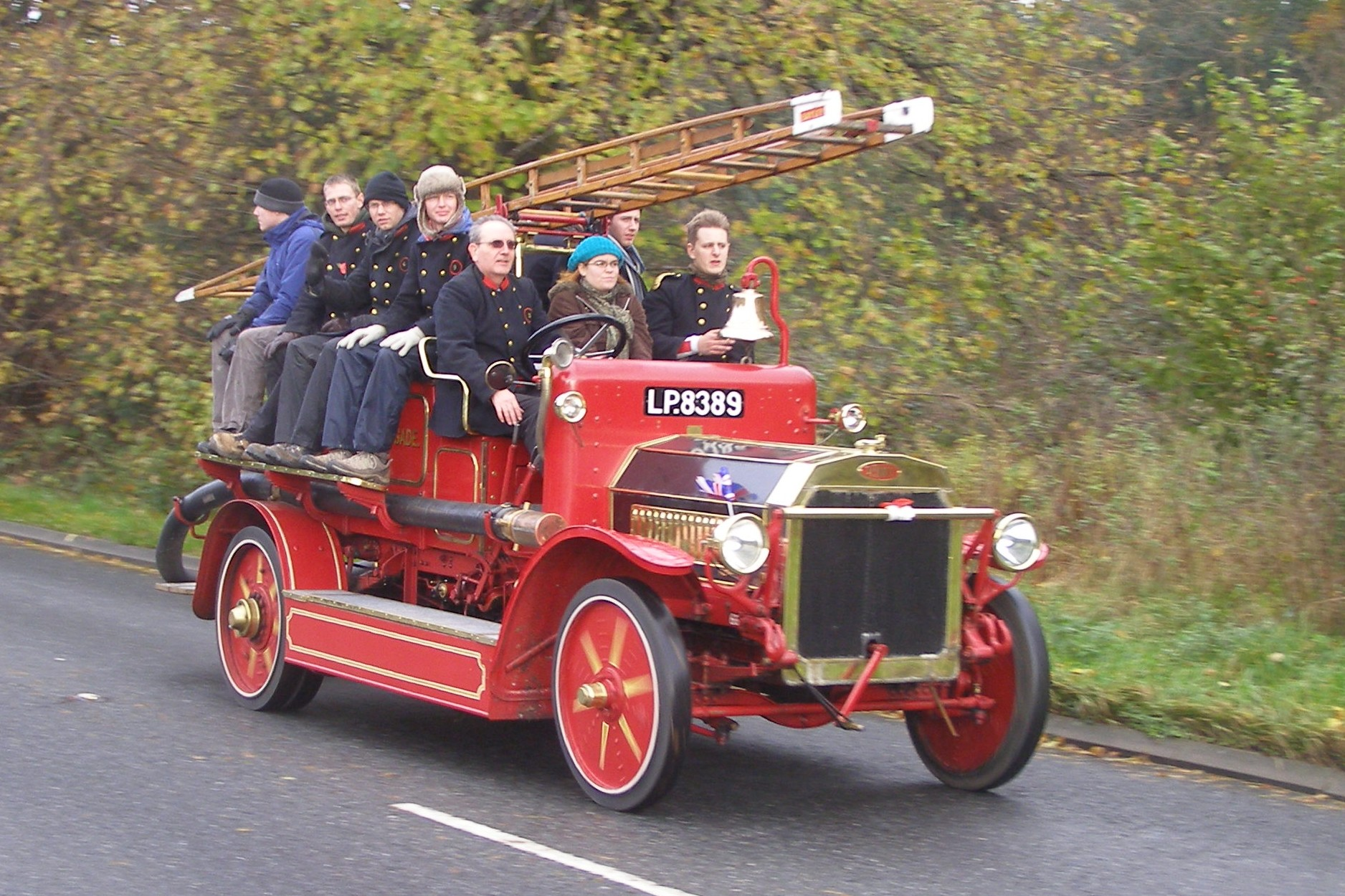
Near Handcross, West Sussex, following the 2008 London to Brighton Veteran Car Run

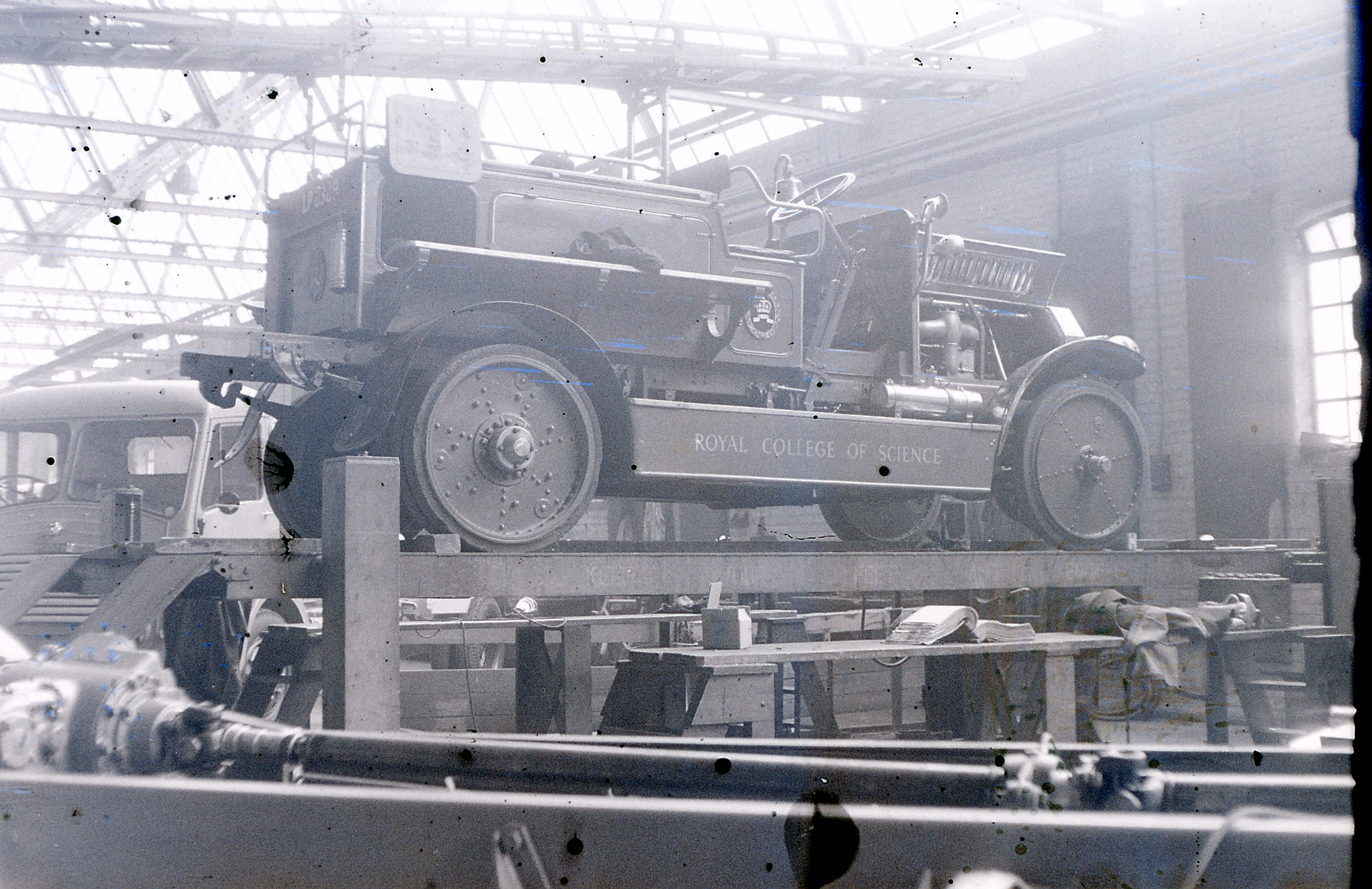
Undergoing maintenance at Dennis, while painted in a Royal College of Science livery, mid-1960s

Dennis N-Type LP 8389, known as Jezebel

Jezebel is a Dennis N-Type fire engine that was one of a batch of ten vehicles ordered in October 1915 by the London County Council for the London Fire Brigade.

It was delivered in April 1916 and initially based Vauxhall, but sometime around 1919 was moved to Pageants Wharf Fire Station, Rotherhithe Street, London.

In 1932, the London Fire Brigade upgraded to new appliances and Jezebel was sold to a Joseph Crosfield, a subsidiary of Unilever that manufactured chemicals and soap and was based in Warrington, Cheshire. The company's in-house, private fire brigade operated the engine until 1955, when it was donated it to the Royal College of Science Union for use as official transport of the Union President.

Since then, the engine has been maintained by current and past students of Imperial College London with the objective of keeping it in its original condition. While it was at one time painted purple (one of the Royal College of Science colours) with RCS livery, it is now painted Wrexham Red with a London Fire Brigade livery. In 1979 it was fitted with a working 1923 Dennis water pump. This replaced the original Gwynnes pump that was removed during World War Two.

Jezebel attends many rallies and shows throughout the year, as well as pub crawls and charity events. These regularly include trips to Brighton and the Isle of Wight. The Motor Club philosophy is that Jezebel is there to be run (it travels almost everywhere under its own power, very rarely on a transporter) and the engine's raison d'etre is to amuse and engage both students and the general public.

Jezebel has appeared on TV, including the BBC's Blue Peter children's programme in 1982, an episode of Downton Abbey, and as a guest appearance on Bargain Hunt. It also appeared in the 1967 film The Jokers, directed by Michael Winner.

== See also ==
- Alexander Dennis
- Dennis N-Type
