= Imperial College Halls of Residence =

University residential halls in London

Coordinates: 51°30′1″N 0°10′40″W

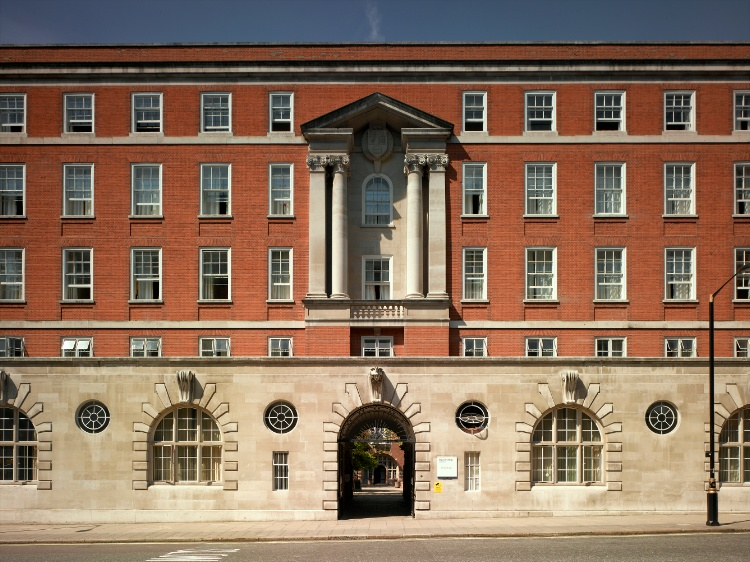
The college's oldest student accommodation, Beit Hall

Imperial College London's main student accommodation comprises six first-year undergraduate halls of residence around West London, primarily South Kensington and North Acton. Accommodation in these halls is generally for first-year undergraduates only, although some students may return as "hall seniors" with operational responsibilities and there are three halls available for continuing students. Halls are run by wardens (and, in some halls, assistant wardens) who are members of staff, along with sub-wardens who are PhD students. Silwood Park halls are postgraduate, but only cater for students studying on the Silwood Park postgraduate site in Berkshire.

The college has enacted a policy in recent years of moving accommodation provision from central London to North Acton. All halls are self-catered.

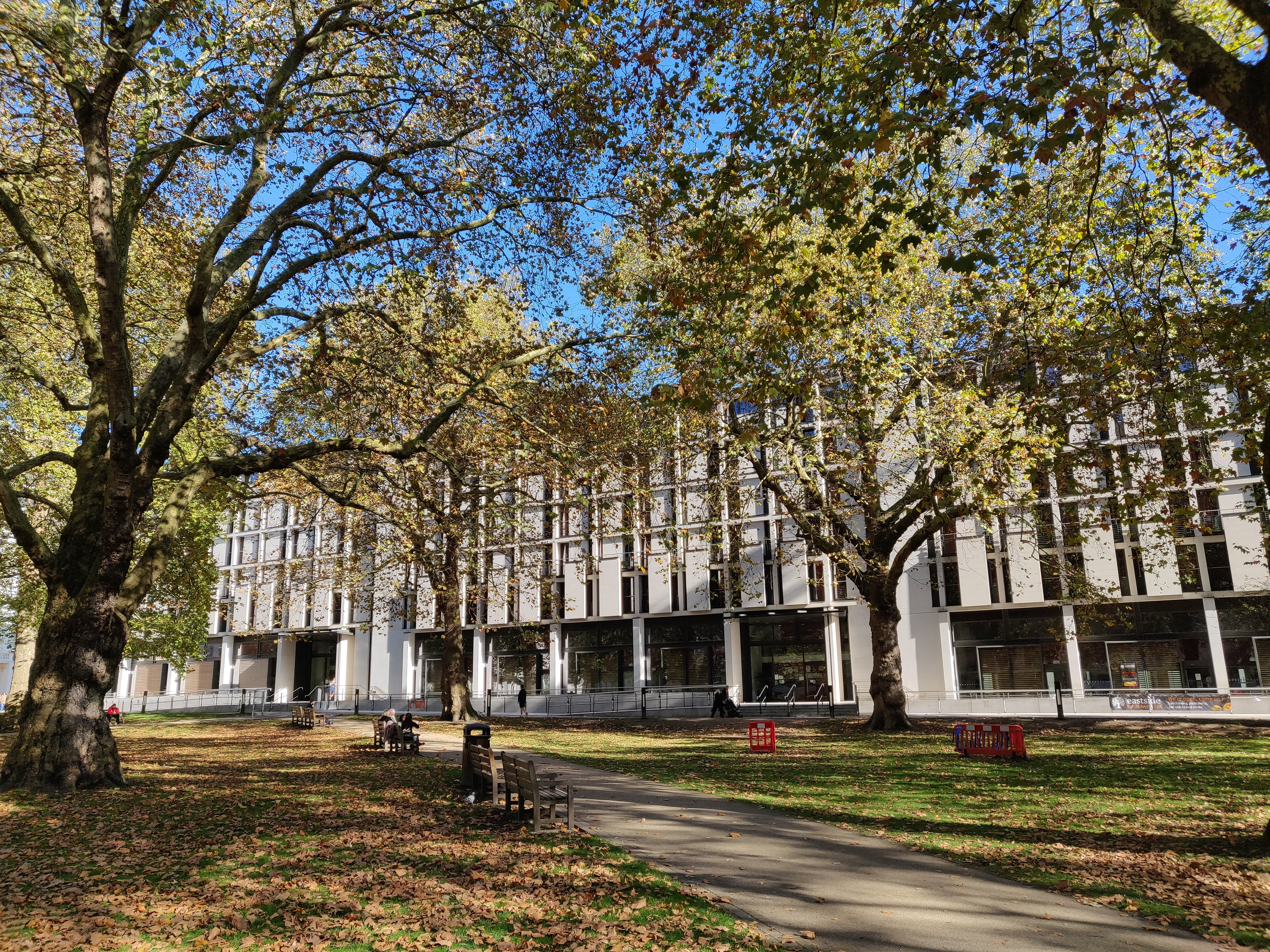
Eastside and Southside halls surround Prince's Garden

== South Kensington ==
Imperial's primary and traditional halls, with room for around 1,200 students, are located on its South Kensington campus.

=== Beit Hall ===
Located right next to Imperial College Union, Beit Hall opened as Beit Hostel in 1926 as the university's first hall of residence. The building is named after Sir Otto Beit, who funded around two-thirds of the construction cost. The hall has 339 bed spaces at an average rent of £241/week.

=== Southside ===
Opened in September 2007, the four Southside halls have a total of 405 bed spaces. They include: Falmouth Hall, named after the 8th Viscount Falmouth; Selkirk Hall, named after William Selkirk; Tizard Hall, named after Henry Tizard; and Keogh Hall, named after Alfred Keogh.

=== Eastside ===
Eastside halls opened in 2009 with a combined 454 bed spaces. The three halls, Linstead, Gabor, and Wilkinson, are respectively named after Patrick Linstead, Dennis Gabor, and Geoffrey Wilkinson.

== North Acton ==
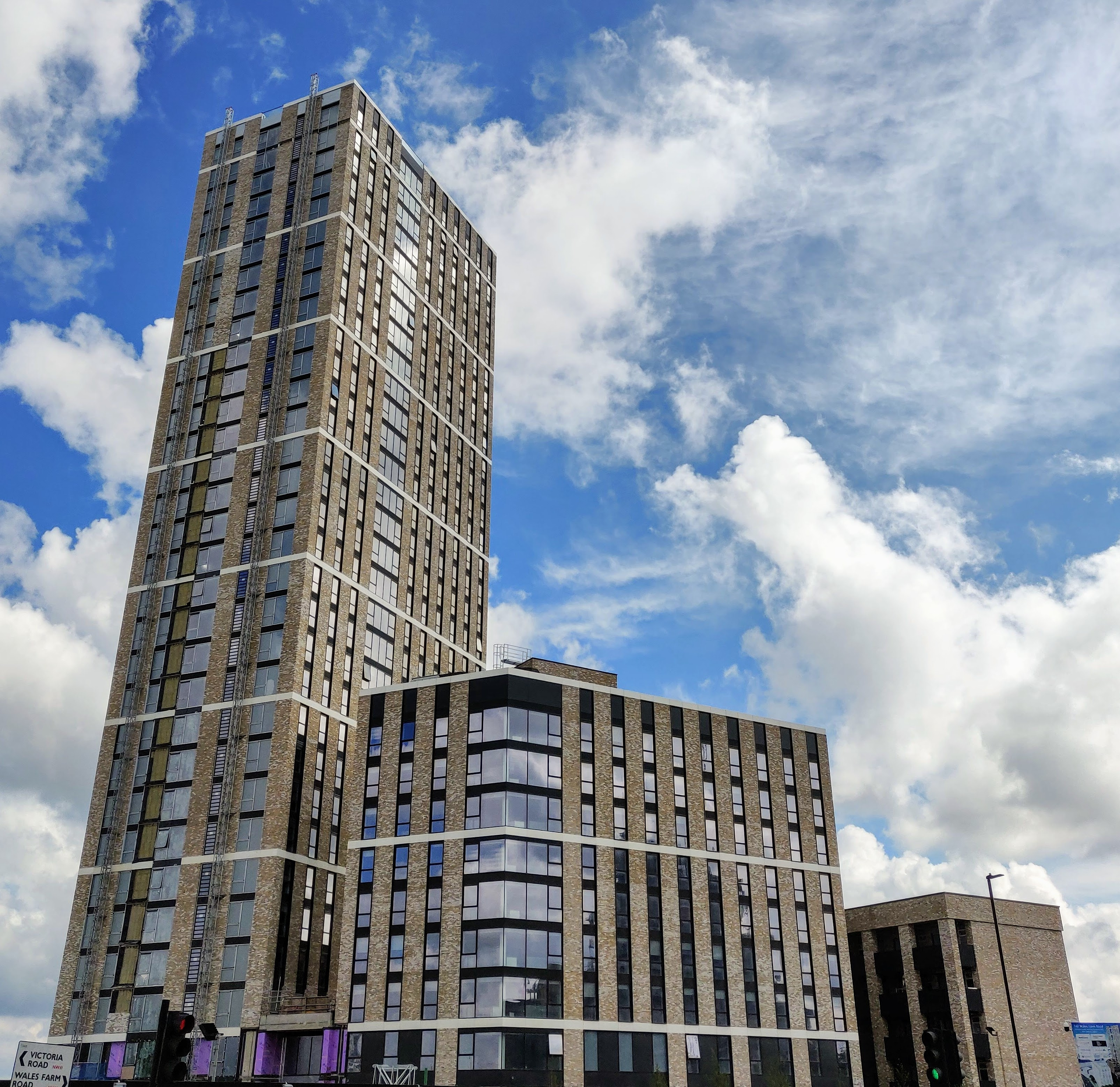
The Kemp Porter Buildings are the college's newest halls

The North Acton halls, with room for around 1,400 students, are located away from Imperial's main South Kensington campus. The first buildings to open on the site was the Woodward Buildings, which opened in 2015 and have a rooftop garden. This was followed by the 31-storey Kemp Porter Buildings, which topped out in 2019. There have been local complaints about the appearance of the Woodward Buildings, as well as student complaints about the relocation of accommodation space to Acton. Kemp Porter has 708 bed spaces in around 600 rooms, while Woodward holds 689 students.

== Wilson House ==
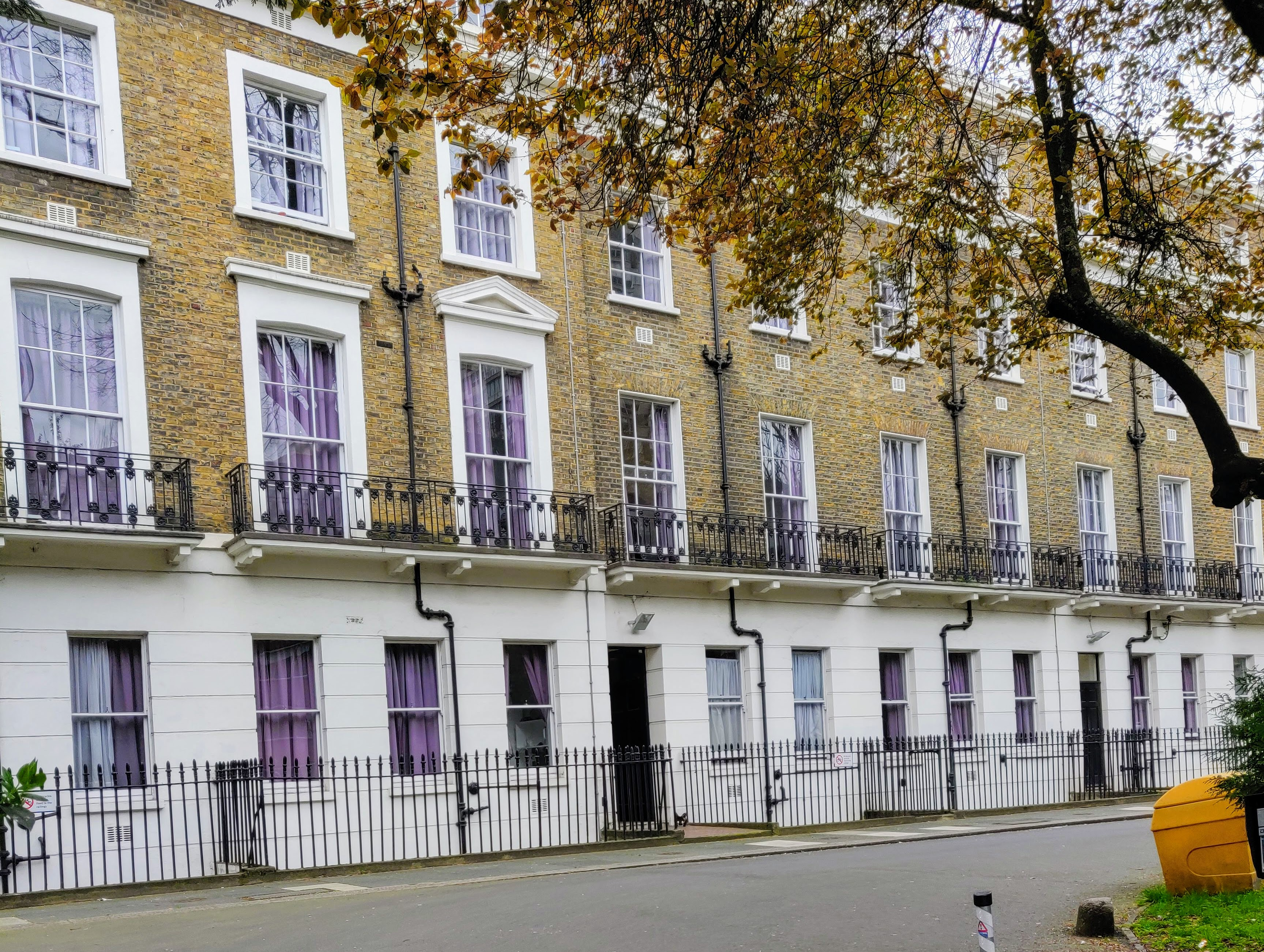
Wilson House, Paddington

Wilson House is located near to Edgware Road and Paddington tube stations. It consists of 22 connected Victorian houses with a purpose-built block located behind these, holding 382 students in total. Wilson House is a Grade-II listed building. The hall belonged to St. Mary's Hospital Medical School prior to its merger into the Imperial College School of Medicine.

== Continuing students ==
Accommodation for around 470 continuing undergraduate students is available in:

- Evelyn Gardens, Chelsea, 256 bed spaces
- Parsons House, West Kensington, 46 bed spaces
- Xenia, near Southbank and Waterloo Station, 166 bed spaces

== Silwood Park ==
The postgraduate-only accommodation at Silwood Park consists of five halls with room for a total of 86 students:

- Silwood Park
  - Brian Flowers
  - John Smith
  - Southwood
  - William Penney
  - Mary Flowers

== Former halls of residence ==
=== Original Southside and Weeks Halls ===
The first halls next to Prince's Gardens—Falmouth, Keogh, Selkirk, and Tizard—opened in 1963, and formed Southside Halls. Linstead Hall and the first sport centre followed in 1968. The original Southside and Weeks Halls were Grade II listed in 1993. In 2005 the Prince's Gardens halls were demolished, with the sports centre reopening as Ethos gym in 2006. Weeks hall is no longer used as a hall of residence, but remains as a college building.

== See also ==
- History of Imperial College London
- Halls of residence at University College London
