= City and Guilds College Union =

Students' union at the Imperial College

City & Guilds College Union
- Motto: Domine Dirige Nos ("O Lord Direct us")
- Institution: Imperial College of Science, Technology and Medicine City & Guilds College (Now the Faculty of Engineering)
- Location: South Kensington, London, United Kingdom
- President: Zelin Shao
- Vice president: Apollo Yang
- Honorary secretary: Lina Benchekroun
- Treasurer: Francis Li
- Affiliations: Constituent College Union of Imperial College Union
Colours
- Website: cgcu.co.uk

The City & Guilds College Union (CGCU) represents students from the departments of Aeronautics, Chemical Engineering, Civil Engineering, Design Engineering, Electrical and Electronic Engineering, and Mechanical Engineering, together with Bioengineering and Computing at Imperial College London. Other departments within the Faculty of Engineering are represented by the Royal School of Mines Union (RSMU). The Faculty of Natural Sciences and the Faculty of Medicine are represented by Royal College of Science Union (RCSU) and Imperial College School of Medicine Union (ICSMU). They are all that remains of the four former Constituent Colleges that formed the Imperial College of Science, Technology and Medicine, which was restructured in 2001 with a faculty structure. The City and Guilds College Association (CGCA) represent alumni of the City & Guilds College, with the Old Centralians' Trust as their registered charity (Number 1048552) to financially support current students.

== History ==
In 1876, the City & Guilds of London Institute was founded by the City of London Corporation and 16 Livery Companies, a type of Guild, to further technical education. The site on Exhibition Road was known as Central Technical College, later being renamed to the City & Guilds College in 1907 with the College being incorporated by Royal Charter into the Imperial College in 1910. Alumni of the City & Guilds College Union are referred to as Old Centralians, hence the Old Centralians (OC) Trust. The founding Livery Companies played an important role in the early days of the College, with some contributing to the costs of Beit Hall. The 16 were:

- The Worshipful Company of Mercers
- The Worshipful Company of Drapers
- The Worshipful Company of Fishmongers
- The Worshipful Company of Goldsmiths
- The Worshipful Company of Salters
- The Worshipful Company of Ironmongers
- The Worshipful Company of Clothworkers
- The Worshipful Company of Dyers
- The Worshipful Company of Leathersellers
- The Worshipful Company of Pewterers
- The Worshipful Company of Armourers and Brasiers
- The Worshipful Company of Carpenters
- The Worshipful Company of Cordwainers
- The Worshipful Company of Coopers
- The Worshipful Company of Plaisterers
- The Worshipful Company of Needlemakers

The shields of each Livery Company alongside that of the City of London Corporation are displayed within the City and Guilds Building (CAGB), home to the Department of Aeronautics and the Department of Mechanical Engineering. The building was renamed in 2017. Relationships between the College and the City Livery Movement extend beyond the 16 founding companies, with various Livery Companies supporting both departments within CGCU and RSMU. For example, the Worshipful Company of Coachmakers & Coach Harness Makers consider students from Imperial College for their University Awards

== Present Day ==
The City & Guilds College Union supports its students, affectionately known as Guildsmen and Guildswomen, through a wide range of events throughout the academic year. These include stalls handing out sanitary products and food from around the world to Halloween pub nights and horse racing. The flagship event is the Welcome Dinner, with the 128th Annual Welcome Dinner being held in the De Vere Grand Connaught Rooms in Holborn. To celebrate the end of the pandemic and the return of the Welcome Dinner, the 123rd Annual Welcome dinner was held in Guildhall in the City of London with over 500 guests. The annual boat party along the Thames, held in 2nd term, is hosted jointly with the Department of Computing Society (DocSoc).

Though mostly attended by alumni, CGCU members are encouraged to attend (at a discounted rate) the CGCA Annual Dinners, often held in livery halls around the City of London or other venues closely associated with the City. The 112th and 113th Annual Dinners were held in Grocers' Hall and Lincoln's Inn respectively. Upon graduation, students are granted the Associateship of the City & Guilds of London Institute (ACGI) alongside their degree.

In 1955, the City and Guilds College Union president took part in the college's Commemoration Day procession, a role which continues to this day.

== Structure ==
Every year in the summer, the Officers of the CGCU are elected in the Imperial College Leadership Elections alongside various other positions. Vacant positions are filled during the autumn elections. The senior Officers form the Executive Committee, consisting the President, Vice President, Secretary, Treasurer, Activities Chair, Clubs and Societies Chair, Education Chair, Wellbeing Chair, Communications Chair and Alumni Officer. The additional Officers are as follows: Sports Officer, Clubs and Societies Officer, Faculty Education Officer, Faculty Wellbeing Officer, Sponsorship Officer, Events Officers, Media & Marketing Officer (x2), Regalia Officer, Webmaster, Guildsheet Editors, Bolt Bearer, Spanner Bearer and The Chair of each Departmental Society Committee. Notably, the roles of Bolt Bearer and Spanner Bearer also function as Events Officers in addition to their primary role of protection of Spanner and Bolt.

== Colours, Regalia and Insignia ==
The arms of the CGCU is an amended version of the heraldic achievement of the City of London Corporation (shared with the City & Guilds College), with the motto "Domine Dirige Nos" swapped for "City & Guilds Union", though the original is sometimes used. The escutcheon, or Shield, is also used as CGCU insignia.

Regalia is often worn by CGCU Officers and closely associated organisations such as the CGCA or Team Bo'. The most visible is the CGCU Blazer and Top Hat, which can be worn by The President, Vice President, Chairs and Honorary Secretary as well as the driver and co-driver(s) of Bo. The CGCU blazer is Guilds Red with a repeated double, thin, light silver stripes and buttons featuring the Shield. The CGCU top hat is light silver with a Guilds Red hatband with light silver stripe. Constitutionally, it can be worn by anyone else at the President's prerogative. Other Regalia includes the CGCU scarf, cufflinks, umbrellas and hats. Members of the Executive are entitled to wear the Executive tie which comprises alternate wide Guilds Red and light silver stripes.

Members of the CGCU can be recognised with various awards, notably Half and Full Colours and the President's Award. Such recognition enables the award winner to wear their respective ties. The Half Colours tie features the Arms with the cross in Guilds Red, on a dark blue and white quarters, on a dark blue background with thin white stripes whilst the Full Colours tie features the Arms with the cross in Guilds Red on a dark blue background. The President's Award tie features the Arms with the cross in white, on a dark blue background.

== Mascotry & Traditions ==
With a history spanning over a century, CGCU and the various other constituent unions have developed their own traditions and rivalries. In particular, the Union has a long-standing rivalry with the Royal College of Science Union, against which it engaged in food fights. Officers of the CGCU, alongside all other Imperial Societies and Constituent Unions, may have a pewter tankard in the Imperial College Union Bar in Beit with their name engraved on it and can use it whenever they visit.

Historically, as part of Raising and Giving (RAG), the CGCU organised events across the UK. In the past, the Union has organised a tricycle record attempt around the coast of Britain raising money for the RNLI, as well as raft races on the Serpentine and tugs of war in the 1960s with other constituent unions. Though these events are mostly confined to history. Guildsmen and women similarly took part in the Morphy Day Cup, a now banned rowing competition between the Constituent Colleges along the Thames that once resulted in a policeman being "plastered in tomatoes and flour".

Such inter-collegiate events and rivalries gave rise to the Boomalaka, the CGCU chant still in use today. The Boomalaka was created by Arthur Montagu Holbein likely in the 1910s, a Captain in the Royal Field Artillery whose studies were interrupted during the 1st World War. The College chant is recited at every dinner, significant event or at the President's discretion. It is as follows:

President: Ladies and Gentlemen of Guilds, please be upstanding...

President: Ladies and Gentlemen of Guilds, are you in good voice?

All: Yes!

President: Then let's have a Boomalaka!

All:

One. Two. Three.

Boomalaka! Boomalaka!
Ra! Ra! Ra!
Zingalaka! Zingalaka!
Ya! Ya! Ya!

Boomalaka! Zingalaka!
Who are we?
We are, we are C and G!

Oooay, oooay, oooay.
Ra! Ra! Ra!
Hoo-ray!

The Boomalaka is always performed upstanding, and is shouted, regardless of the location including in Guildhall in 1985 in the presence of the Lord Mayor of the City of London and HRH The Prince Philip the Duke of Edinburgh for the centenary of the City & Guilds College. If present, the Bolt Bearer and Spanner Bearer thrust their respective mascots into the air.

The City and Guilds College has four Mascots, two are inviolate meaning they cannot be stolen. The two inviolate mascots are Boanerges (Bo') and Derrick, both looked after and maintained by the student-led CGCU Motor Club affectionately known as Team Bo. Boanerges is a 1902 James & Browne motorcar bought by CGCU students in the 1930s. Still in running condition, he takes part in the London to Brighton Veteran Car Run each year. In 1956, Bo was famously pulled over by police for "speeding" at 27 mph. Derrick is a 1926 Ner-a-Car motorcycle, known for his unusual long design. Derrick once "escaped" during an RCSU mascot ride, and it was only to be paraded back into Guilds territory by engineers. In 1979, Bo took part in the Lord Mayor's Show.

The two violate (stealable) mascots are Bolt & Spanner, each protected by an annually elected Bolt Bearer and Spanner Bearer. Bolt is a giant foot-long, 68 lb cast-iron bolt mounted in concrete and was made in 1948. Spanner is solid bronze and weighs 64 lbs and was made in 1964. Spanner perfectly fits the bolts used on London Bridge, which is owned by the City of London, and can be used to tighten Bolt. Together, they are often stolen by the Davy or Theta Bearers of RSMU and RCSU respectively and must be retrieved by CGCU Officers. Similarly, the CGCU Mascot Bearers work to steal Davy and Theta year round. In previous years, 'Mascot Raids' have caused issues when they get out of hand, including the use of fire extinguishers (Felix - Issue 683 - 19 Oct 1984). Interviews with students about Mascot Raids can be found on Colin Grimshaw's blog and in Felix.

== See also ==
- Royal College of Science Union
- City and Guilds of London Institute
