= Dennis N-Type =

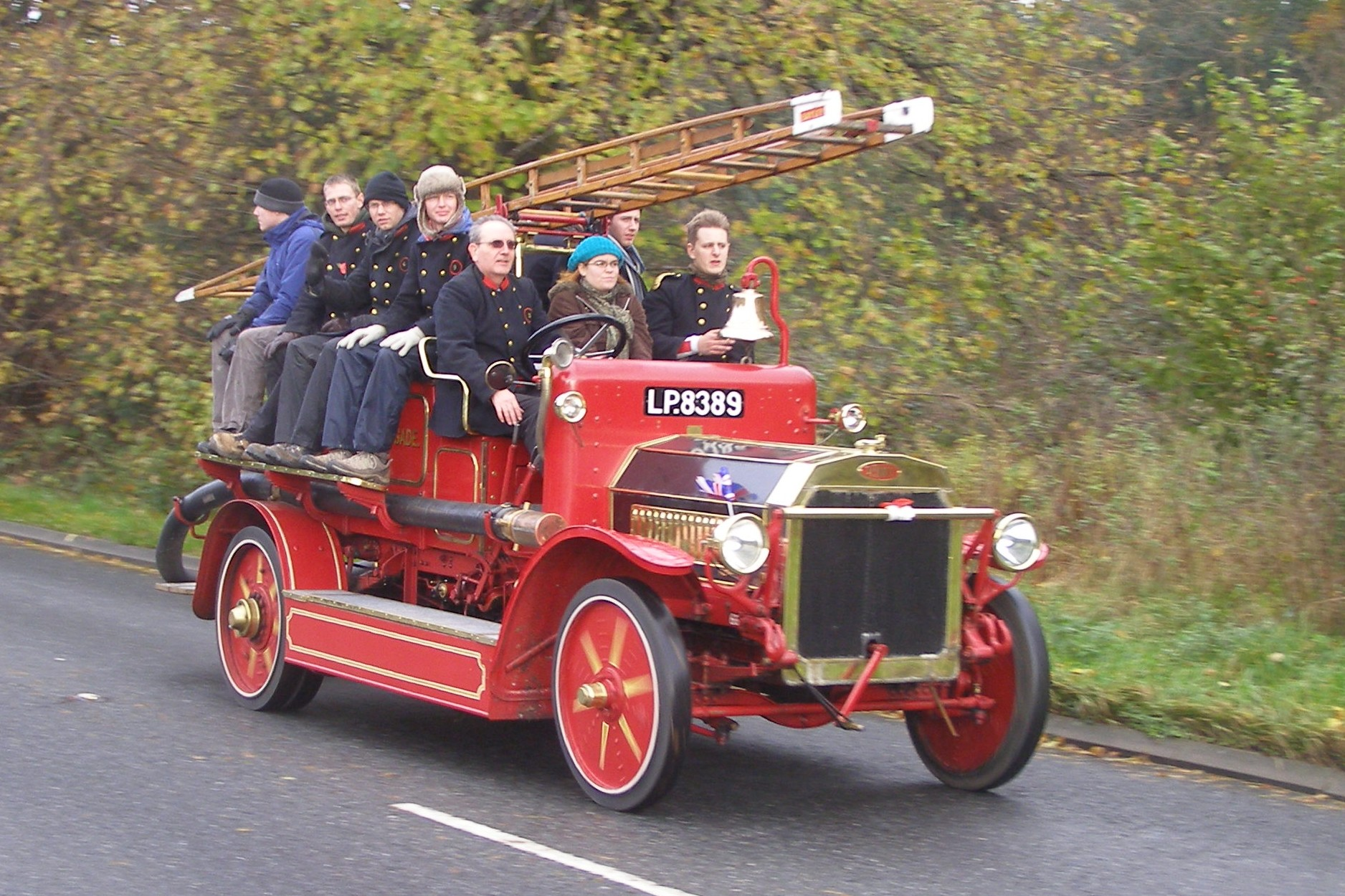
1916-built Dennis N-type in 2008

The Dennis N-Type is a model of commercial vehicle introduced by Dennis Brothers of Guildford (later Dennis Specialist Vehicles) in around 1905. It was the basis for their early fire engines and trucks.

== Specification ==
The "N-Type" chassis was constructed from rolled steel channel; riveted and braced at appropriate points. It incorporated a sub frame on which the engine and gearbox were mounted.

As for later Dennis fire engines, the water pump was a centrifugal pump, rather than the piston pumps used by other makers. This was more complex to build than the long-established piston pumps, but had advantages in operation. Where water was supplied under pressure from a hydrant, rather than by suction from a pond, this additional pressure was boosted through the centrifugal pump, whereas a piston pump would have throttled it. Piston pumps also gave a pulsating outlet pressure which required an air-filled receiver to even this out. A drawback of the usual centrifugal design was the considerable axial force generated by the pump impeller, requiring a thrust bearing. Dennis avoided this by using a doubled-sided impeller which balanced the overall force.

== History ==
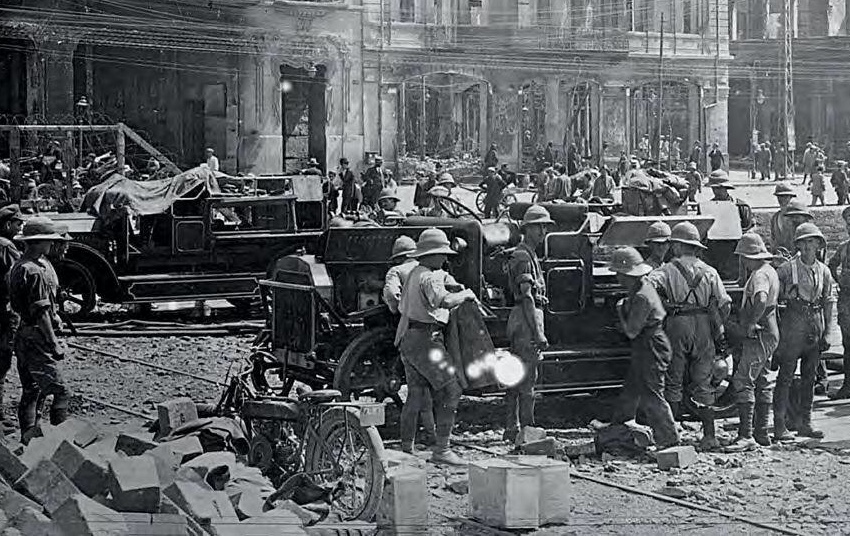
Dennis N Type fire engines being used by the Army Service Corps, Salonika 1918

The majority of Dennis commercial vehicles were built on this type of chassis until further chassis designs were introduced. The last vehicles based on this design were produced in the late 1920s.

The chassis was generally fitted with engines by White and Poppe of Coventry. White and Poppe were bought by Dennis Brothers in 1919.

Some Dennis N Types were used by the British Army and the American Expeditionary Forces during the First World War.

== See also ==
- Alexander Dennis
- 4 'N' Types in Preservation
- RCS Motor Club
