= Royal College of Science =

Former higher education institution located in South Kensington

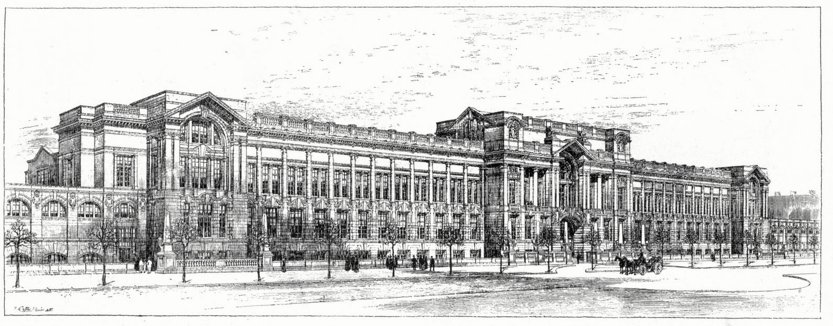
The Royal College of Science in 1901

The Royal College of Science was a higher education institution located in South Kensington; it was a constituent college of Imperial College London from 1907 until it was wholly absorbed by Imperial in 2002. Still to this day, graduates from the Faculty of Natural Sciences at Imperial College London receive an Associateship to the Royal College of Science. Organisations linked with the college include the Royal College of Science Union and the Royal College of Science Association.

== History ==
The Royal College of Science has its earliest origins in the Royal College of Chemistry founded under the auspices of Prince Albert in 1845, located first in Hanover Square and then from 1846 in somewhat cheaper premises in Oxford Street. Cash-strapped from the start as a private institution, in 1853 it was merged in with the School of Mines, founded in 1851 in Jermyn Street, and placed under the newly created British government Science and Art Department, although it continued to retain its own premises and substantially its own identity.

In 1872–3, the College of Chemistry moved into a new building at South Kensington (now the Henry Cole wing of the Victoria and Albert museum), along with the physics and biology classes previously taught at the School of Mines. The building, built on land acquired for "educational purposes" by the commissioners of the Great Exhibition of 1851, and next to another of Science and Art Department's projects the South Kensington Museum (later the Victoria & Albert Museum), had originally been intended to be a new school of naval architecture. But the scientists pressed the need for much better laboratory space, so the school of naval architecture instead went to Greenwich. One notable advocate for the new facilities was T.H. Huxley, who soon put them to good use, pioneering the greatly expanded use of laboratory work in biology teaching.

The Science and Art Department was keen to improve the quality of technical education, in particular the systematic training of school teachers, and so new classes in mathematics, astronomy, botany, and agriculture were added, alongside the departments of mechanics, metallurgy, and geology, which soon also moved from Jermyn Street. (Mineralogy and mining remained behind at the Museum of Practical Geology until the 1890s). In recognition of its broadened scope, the "Metropolitan School of Science applied to Mining and the Arts", as it was officially known, was re-established in 1881 as the "Normal School of Science and Royal School of Mines", under Huxley as dean, the name being based on that of the École Normale in Paris.

The Normal School of Science, responsible for subjects including physics, chemistry, mechanics, biology, and agriculture, steadily established its own identity, and in 1890, the name Royal College of Science was granted by Royal Consent.

The RCS and the Royal School of Mines subsequently merged in 1907 with the City and Guilds Central Technical College to form the Imperial College of Science and Technology, each continuing as a Constituent College of Imperial, which then joined the University of London in 1929. This administrative structure continued until 2002, surviving Imperial's mergers with a number of medical schools, which were formed into a fourth constituent college; and Imperial's merger in 2000 with Wye College, of which roughly one-fifth became designated as part of the Royal College of Science.

In 2002, Imperial abolished all the constituent colleges, including the Royal College of Science, in favour of a new faculty structure. The RCS was split into the Faculties of Physical and Life Sciences. However, in 2005, it was announced that the Faculties of Physical and Life Sciences would be re-merged to form the Faculty of Natural Sciences. This reformed the original RCS structure, encompassing all the science departments of Imperial College. Overall, it has amounted to no more than a name change from RCS to Faculty of Natural Sciences, and the new faculty students' union has resurrected the name "Royal College of Science Union".

== The building ==
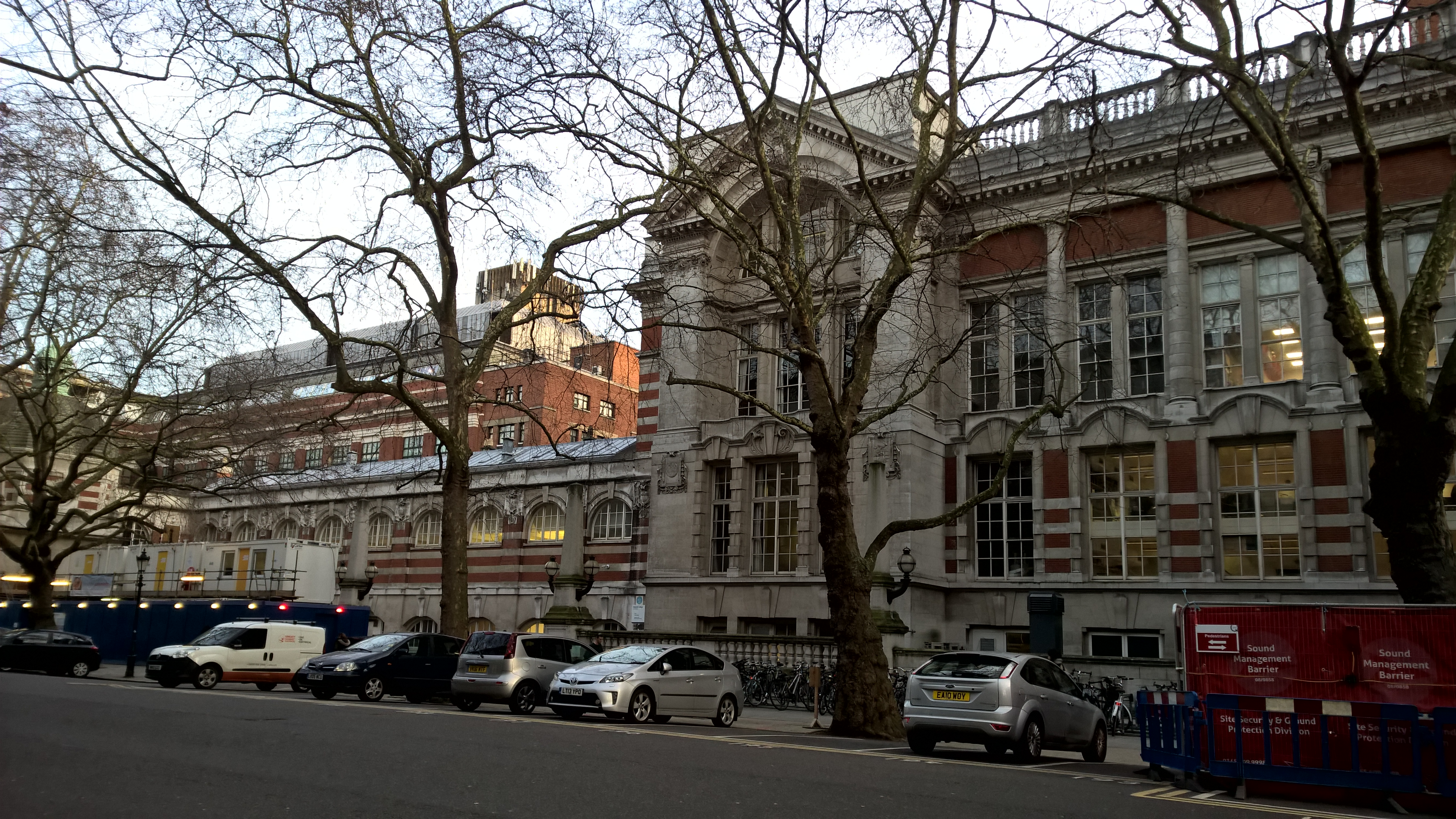
Surviving fragment of the former RCS building

In the years following the establishment of the Normal School of Science in 1881, space became pressing as the college expanded, so work began in 1900 on new premises. In 1906, the RCS moved into an imposing new building designed by Sir Aston Webb, which was built in a Classical style and had distinctive brick courses. It ran the length of the road today called Imperial College Road and formerly faced the Imperial Institute. The RCS building featured state of the art chemistry and physics laboratories in the east and west wings respectively, with the library of the Science Museum (later featured in the film of The Ipcress File) located in the central section between them.

The building has mostly now been demolished, the western wing in 1961 to make way for a new biochemistry building, and the central section in the mid-1970s; but part of the eastern wing still survives as the Chemistry (RCS) building.

== Sources ==
- F. H. W. Sheppard (ed.), Imperial College, Survey of London: volume 38: South Kensington Museums Area (1975), pp. 233–247.
- Harold Allan, Physics in South Kensington
- Bill Griffith, Chemistry at Imperial College: the first 150 years
- Hannah Gay, East end, west end: Science education, culture and class in mid-Victorian London, Canadian Journal of History, Aug 1997
- Hannah Gay, The History of Imperial College London, 1907–2007, World Scientific, 2007
