= Timeline of Imperial College School of Medicine =

A timeline of the Imperial College School of Medicine, the medical school of Imperial College London.

== Westminster Hospital and medical school ==
- 1719 – The Westminster Infirmary opens
- 1760 – The Westminster Infirmary renamed to the Westminster Hospital
- 1834 – The Westminster Hospital moves to new premises in Broad Sanctuary
- 1841 – Westminster Hospital Medical School founded by George Guthrie
- 1907 – Westminster Children's Hospital founded as The Infants' Hospital in Vincent Square
- 1939 – New hospital building opened in Horseferry Road, Westminster
- 1947 – Westminster Children's Hospital amalgamates with The Westminster Hospital
- 1950 – Westminster Hospital building in Broad Sanctuary demolished
- 1995 – The Westminster Hospital moves to Fulham and becomes known as the Chelsea and Westminster Hospital. Old building converted to flats.

== Charing Cross Hospital and medical school ==
- 1818 – Dr Benjamin Golding founds West London Infirmary in Villiers Street along with the Charing Cross Hospital Medical School
- 1827 – West London Infirmary becomes known as Charing Cross Hospital
- 1834 – Charing Cross Hospital moves to Agar Street, off Trafalgar Square
- 1973 – Charing Cross Hospital moves to Hammersmith, front facade of old building retained
- 1976 – Reynolds Building completed to house the Charing Cross Hospital Medical School
- 1984 – Charing Cross Hospital Medical School and rival Westminster Hospital Medical School merge to form Charing Cross and Westminster Medical School

== St Mary's Hospital and medical school ==
- 1747 – The London Lock Hospital is founded
- 1830 – Western General Dispensary is founded
- 1854 – St Mary's Hospital, London and medical school founded in Paddington
- 1928 – Alexander Fleming discovers penicillin
- 1929 – The Paddington Infirmary is renamed the Paddington Hospital
- 1930 – Marylebone Workhouse Infirmary is renamed St Charles' Hospital
- 1948 – The National Health Service is founded and the Paddington Green Children's Hospital, the Princess Louise Hospital, the Samaritan Hospital for Women, St Luke's Hospital, Bayswater (formerly St Luke's Hospital for the Dying) and the Western Eye Hospital join St Mary's to offer more beds in order to meet the recommendations of the 1944 Goodenough Committee

== Hammersmith Hospital and RPMS ==
- 1739 – Queen Charlotte's and Chelsea Hospital opens
- 1902 – Hammersmith Hospital founded
- 1935 – British Postgraduate Medical School opens
- 1947 – British Postgraduate Medical School becomes part of the British Postgraduate Medical Foundation and becomes known as the Postgraduate Medical School of London
- 1974 – Postgraduate Medical School of London renamed Royal Postgraduate Medical School by royal charter
- 1988 – Royal Postgraduate Medical School merges with the Institute of Obstetrics and Gynaecology

== Imperial College ==
- 1907 – Imperial College London founded
- 1988 – St Mary's Hospital Medical School merges with Imperial College London
- 1997 – Charing Cross and Westminster Medical School, St Mary's Hospital Medical School, and Royal Postgraduate Medical School merge with Imperial College London to form Imperial College School of Medicine
- 2007 – St Mary's Hospital, London merges with The Hammersmith Hospitals NHS Trust and Imperial College London to form Imperial College Healthcare NHS Trust, the first academic health science centre
