= St Mary's Hospital, London =

Hospital in London, England

St Mary's Hospital
- Imperial College Healthcare NHS Trust
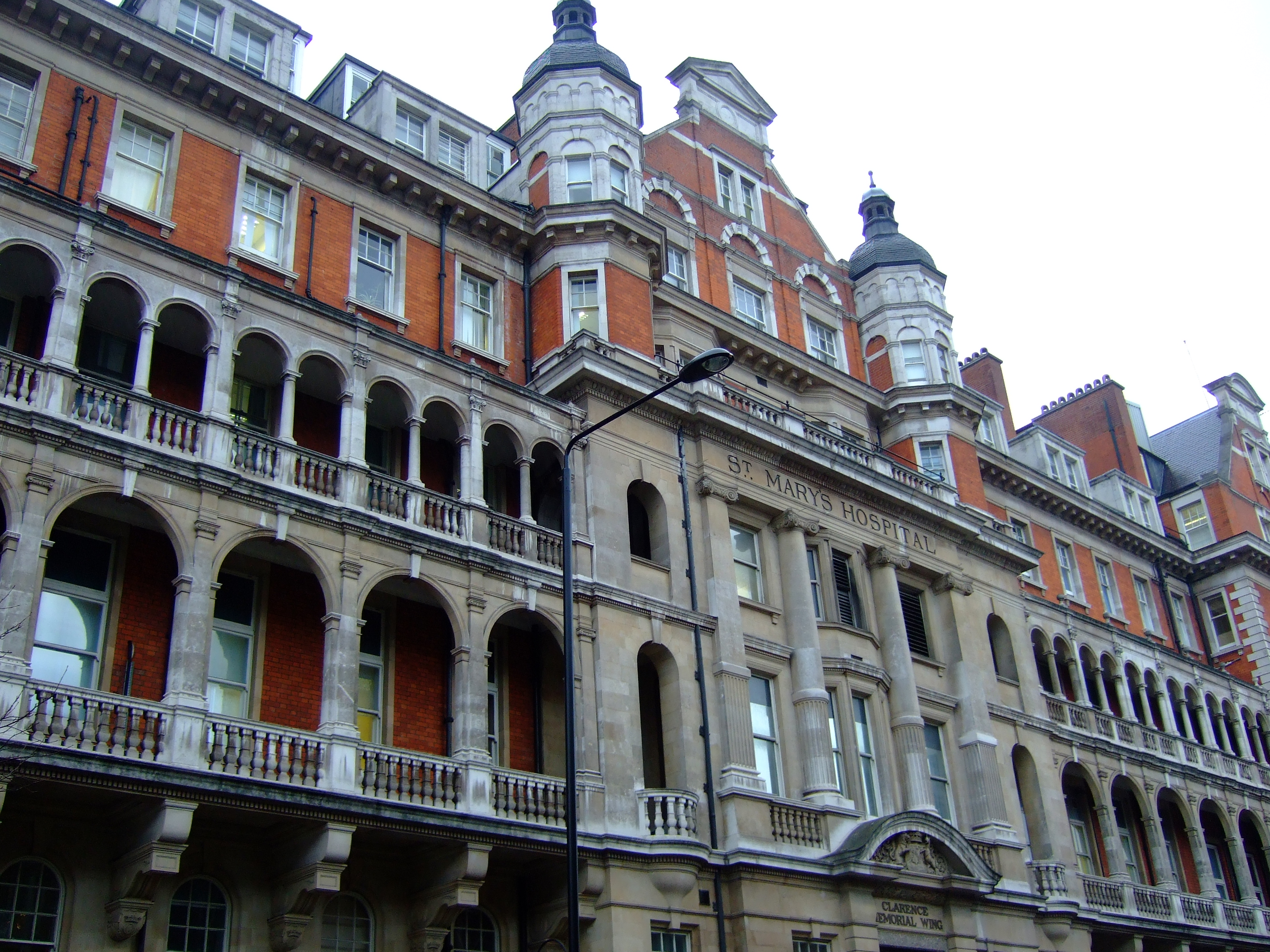
- The Clarence Memorial Wing at St Mary's Hospital

- Shown in Westminster

Geography
- Location: Paddington, London, England
- Coordinates: 51°31′2″N 0°10′23″W

Organisation
- Care system: National Health Service
- Type: Teaching
- Affiliated university: Imperial College London

Services
- Emergency department: Major Trauma Centre – (adult and children)
- Beds: 484

History
- Founded: 1845; 181 years ago

Links
- Website: www.imperial.nhs.uk/our-locations/st-marys-hospital

St Mary's Hospital is a teaching hospital in Paddington, in the City of Westminster, London, founded in 1845. Since the UK's first academic health science centre was created in 2008, it has been operated by Imperial College Healthcare NHS Trust, which also operates Charing Cross Hospital, Hammersmith Hospital, Queen Charlotte's and Chelsea Hospital and the Western Eye Hospital.

Until 1988 the hospital ran St Mary's Hospital Medical School, part of the federal University of London. In 1988 it merged with Imperial College London, and then with Charing Cross and Westminster Medical School in 1997 to form Imperial College School of Medicine. In 2007 Imperial College became an independent institution when it withdrew from the University of London.

== History ==
=== Development of the hospital ===
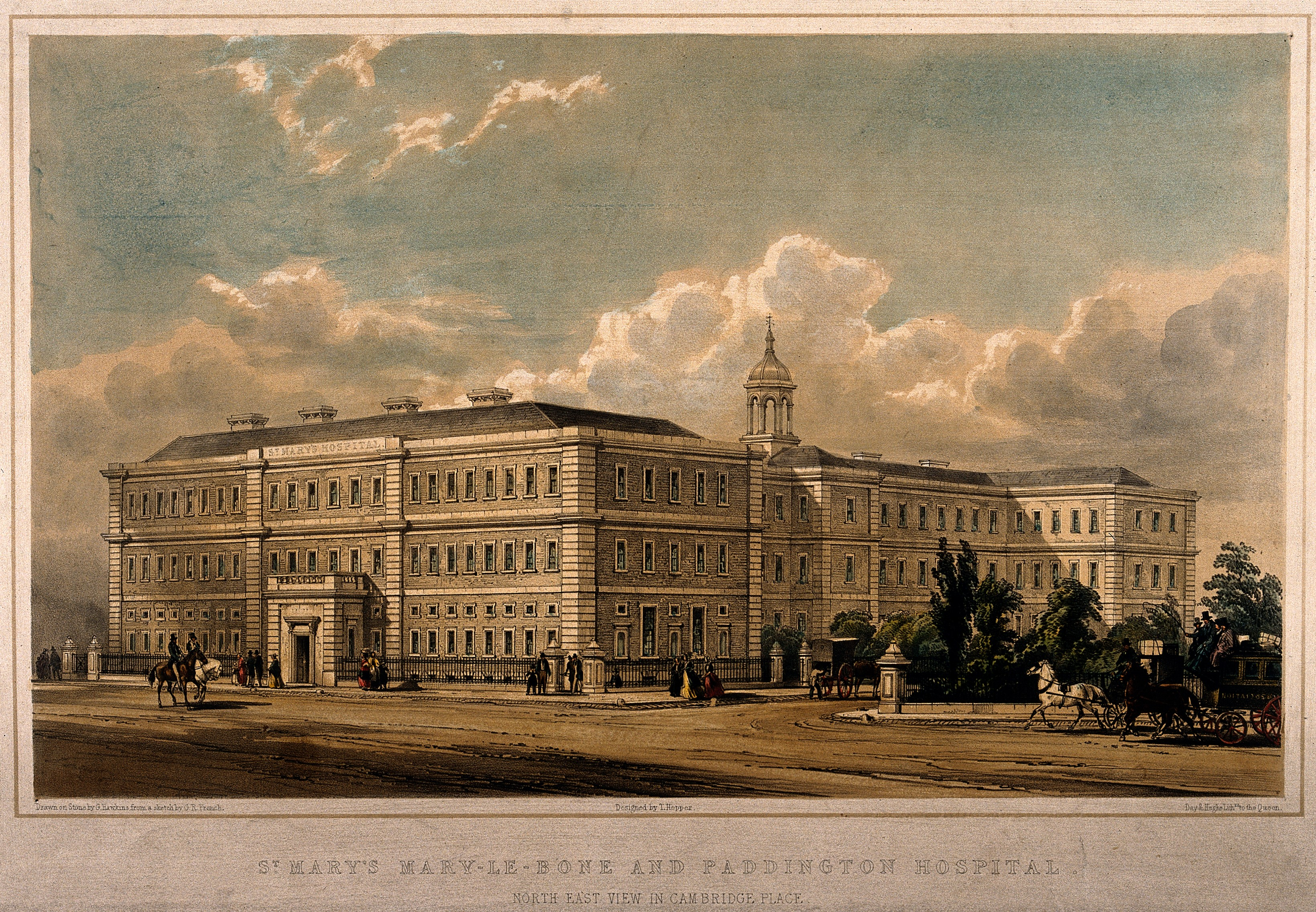
The original block in Norfolk Place

The original block of St Mary's Hospital in Norfolk Place was designed by Thomas Hopper in the classical style. It first opened its doors to patients in 1851, the last of the great voluntary hospitals to be founded. Among St Mary's founders was the surgeon Isaac Baker Brown, a controversial figure who performed numerous clitoridectomies at the London Surgical Home, his hospital for women, and who "immediately set to work to remove the clitoris whenever he had the opportunity of doing so." It was at St Mary's Hospital that C.R. Alder Wright first synthesized diamorphine in 1874.

The Clarence Memorial Wing, designed by Sir William Emerson and built with its main frontage on Praed Street, opened in 1904. It was at the hospital that Alexander Fleming discovered penicillin in 1928. Fleming's laboratory has been restored and incorporated into a museum about the discovery and his life and work. (Note: The museum is open to the public from Monday to Thursday from 10am to 1pm and can be visited by appointment outside of these times. The museum is a member of the London Museums of Health & Medicine.)

The private Lindo wing, where there have been several royal and celebrity births, opened in November 1937; it was financed by businessman and hospital board member Frank Charles Lindo, who made a large donation before his death in 1938. Also in 1937 the Lewis Carroll Ward for children was opened by the Queen. The ward was decorated with tile panels depicting scenes from Carroll's Alice in Wonderland. The tiles, which were made by Carter & Co., were shaped like jigsaw pieces rather than square, making them unusual.

Following the 1944 publication of a report by Sir William Goodenough advocating a minimum size for teaching hospitals, and following the formation of the National Health Service in the 1948, several local hospitals became affiliated to St Mary's Hospital. These included Paddington General Hospital, the Samaritan Hospital for Women and the Western Eye Hospital.

In the 1950s, Felix Eastcott, a consultant surgeon and deputy director of the surgical unit at St Mary's Hospital, carried out pioneering work on carotid endarterectomy designed to reduce the risk of stroke. Paddington General Hospital closed and relocated services to the Paddington basin site in November 1986 and, in common with the other London teaching hospitals who lost their independence at that time, the medical school of St Mary's Hospital merged with that of Imperial College London in 1988.

In 1987, as part of on-going rationalisation within the NHS, the hundred-year-old Paddington Green Children's Hospital was closed down, the listed buildings sold off and its services absorbed into St Mary's.

=== Notable births ===
Royal family

- Alexander Windsor, Earl of Ulster (born 1974) – son of the Duke and Duchess of Gloucester
- Lady Davina Windsor (born 1977) – daughter of the Duke and Duchess of Gloucester
- Peter Phillips (born 1977) – son of the Princess Royal and Mark Phillips
- Lord Frederick Windsor (born 1979) – son of Prince and Princess Michael of Kent
- Lady Rose Gilman (born 1980) – daughter of Duke and Duchess of Gloucester
- Zara Tindall (born 1981) – daughter of the Princess Royal and Mark Phillips
- Lady Gabriella Kingston (born 1981) – daughter of Prince and Princess Michael of Kent
- William, Prince of Wales (born 1982) – first son of King Charles III and Diana, Princess of Wales
- Princess Theodora of Greece and Denmark (born 1983) – daughter of the King Constantine II of Greece and Queen Anne-Marie of Greece
- Prince Harry, Duke of Sussex (born 1984) – second son of King Charles III and Diana, Princess of Wales
- Prince Philippos of Greece and Denmark (born 1986) – son of King Constantine II of Greece and Queen Anne-Marie of Greece
- Edward Windsor, Lord Downpatrick (born 1988) – son of George Windsor, Earl of St Andrews and Sylvana Windsor, Countess of St Andrews
- Prince George of Wales (born 2013) – first son of William, Prince of Wales, and Catherine, Princess of Wales
- Princess Charlotte of Wales (born 2015) – daughter of William, Prince of Wales, and Catherine, Princess of Wales
- Prince Louis of Wales (born 2018) – second son of William, Prince of Wales, and Catherine, Princess of Wales

Other notable births

- Seal (born 1963) – British musician
- Olivia Robertson (1917–2013) – author, co-founder and High Priestess of the Fellowship of Isis
- Elvis Costello (born 1954) – British musician
- Kiefer Sutherland (born 1966) – Canadian actor
- Lady Charlotte Wellesley (born 1990) – daughter of the 9th Duke of Wellington
- Michael Page (born 1987) – British professional boxer and mixed martial artist
- Louis Spencer, Viscount Althorp (born 1994) – heir apparent to the Spencer earldom, nephew of Diana, Princess of Wales and first cousin of the Prince of Wales and the Duke of Sussex
- Admiral Schofield (born 1997) – American basketball player, currently with the Orlando Magic
- Tosin Adarabioyo (born 1997) – English-Nigerian football player, currently with Tottenham Hotspur
- Evie Pig – fictional character on Peppa Pig.

=== Notable staff and alumni ===
- Arthur Cecil Alport – physician who first identified Alport syndrome in 1927
- Roger Bannister – first man to run a four-minute mile, professor of neurology
- Dorothy Bannon – matron 1922–1928, subsequently first Chief Matron-in-Charge of the London County Council Hospital and School Nursing Service
- Aleck Bourne – gynaecologist best known for his 1938 trial, a landmark case in abortion law
- William Broadbent – 19th-century neurologist and cardiologist
- John Scott Burdon-Sanderson – Regius Professor of Medicine at the University of Oxford and Royal Medal winner
- J. Jackson Clarke – pathologist, surgeon, and cancer researcher
- Leonard Colebrook – physician and bacteriologist, MBBS in 1906, who, in 1935, showed Prontosil was effective against haemolytic streptococcus of puerperal fever
- Zachary Cope – surgeon and medical historian
- Ruth Darbyshire - matron from 1913 to 1916, subsequently Matron-in-Chief of the British Red Cross and Order of St. John of Jerusalem from March 1940 to September 1943.
- Ara Darzi, Baron Darzi of Denham – Health Minister
- Alexander Fleming – awarded the Nobel Prize for discovery of penicillin
- Nim Hall – England rugby captain
- John Henry – clinical toxicologist who did crucial work on poisoning and drug overdose
- Amanda Herbert – cytopathologist and histopathologist, editor of Cytopathology from 2008 to 2014 and co-editor of Eurocytology.eu
- Albert Neuberger – professor of chemical pathology
- Tom Oppé – professor of paediatrics
- Tuppy Owen-Smith – international rugby player and cricketer
- William Stanley Peart – professor of medicine, isolated and determined the structure of angiotensin
- Arthur Porritt, Baron Porritt – President of the British Medical Association and the Royal College of Surgeons of England and Governor-General of New Zealand
- Rodney Robert Porter – awarded the Nobel Prize for research on the chemical structure of antibodies
- Bernard Spilsbury – pathologist and one of the pioneers of modern forensic medicine
- Joseph Toynbee – otologist
- Augustus Waller – whose research led to the invention of the electrocardiogram (ECG)
- J. P. R. Williams – international rugby player
- Almroth Wright – advanced vaccination through the use of autogenous vaccines
- Charles Romley Alder Wright – first person to synthesize heroin in 1874
- Wu Lien-teh – later to be the Plague fighter of China

== Associations ==
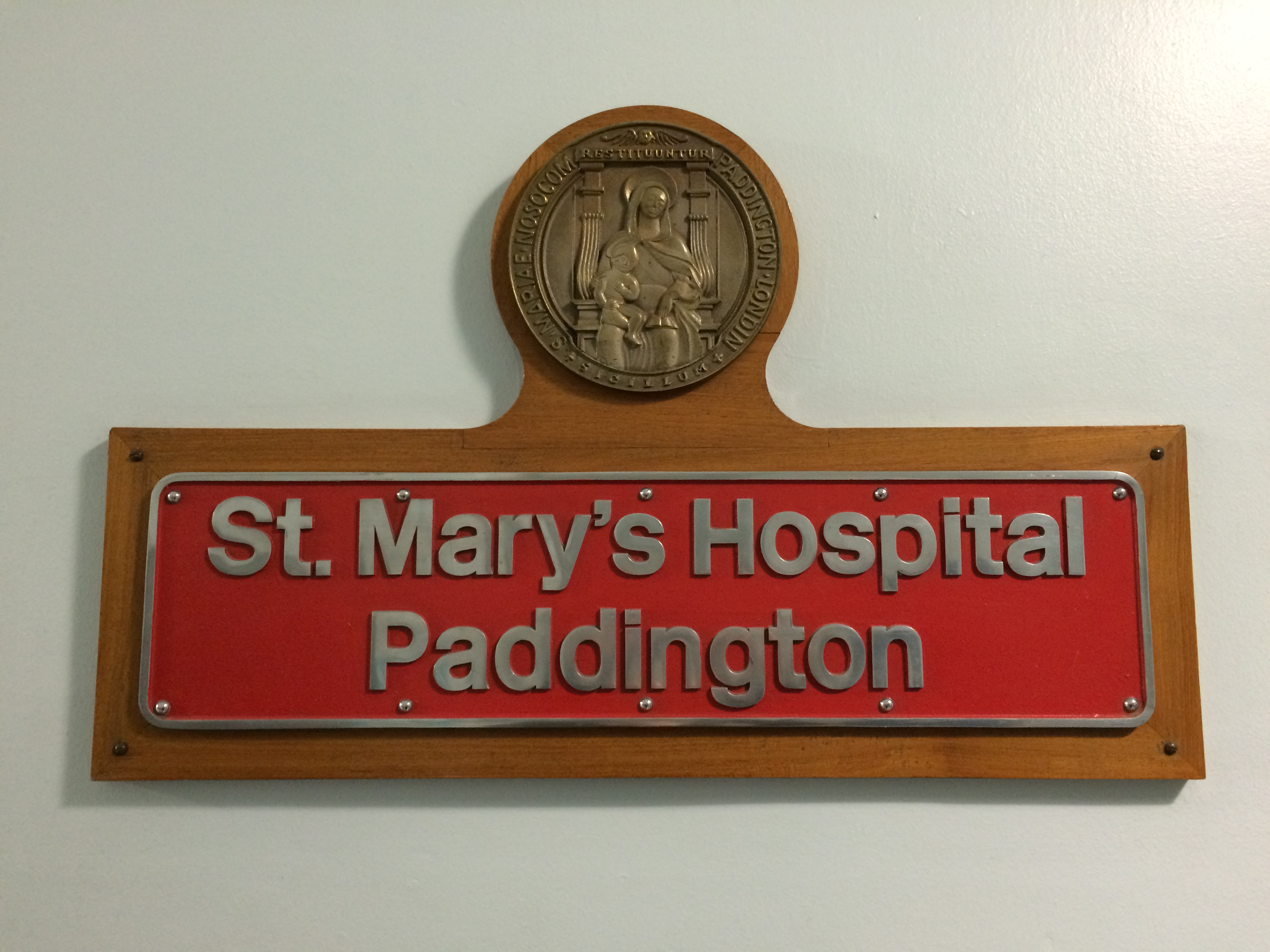
The nameplate of British Rail class 43 locomotive 43142, St Mary's Hospital Paddington, now on display in the Cambridge Wing of the hospital in London

St Mary's Hospital is located beside London Paddington railway station, the principal station of the Great Western Railway and its successors. In celebration of the association, a British Rail Class 43 (InterCity 125) locomotive, 43142, was named St Mary's Hospital, Paddington on 4 November 1986. The locomotive is still in service but, following changes of ownership, the name has now been removed. One of the large metal nameplates was acquired by the hospital, and is now displayed in the foyer of the Cambridge Wing.

== Major trauma centre ==
St Mary's Hospital is one of four major trauma centres in London. The other three are King's College Hospital in Denmark Hill, The Royal London Hospital in Whitechapel, and St George's Hospital in Tooting.

== Cosmic charity ==
The charity Cosmic is an independent charity, supporting the work of the neonatal and paediatric intensive care services at St Mary's Hospital, Paddington and Queen Charlotte's Hospital, Hammersmith, both part of Imperial College Healthcare NHS Trust, London. The charity funds a range of specialist equipment for the units, including ventilators and patient monitoring systems for those being treated on the wards, as well as providing practical and emotional support to families.

== See also ==
- List of hospitals in England
