= Elspeth Smith =

British academic and biochemist

Elspeth Smith FRS(E)
- Born: Elspeth Bruce Dunkerley; 1923
- Died: 3 October 2017 (aged 93–94)
- Employers: Ministry of Aircraft Production; Cambridge University; St Bartholomew's Hospital; Middlesex Hospital; University of Aberdeen

Elspeth Bruce Smith FRSE (1923 – 3 October 2017), née Dunkerley, was a British academic and biochemist.

Smith was educated at Cambridge, London and Aberdeen.

During World War II she was employed by the Ministry of Aircraft Production. Afterwards, she was a research assistant at Cambridge University and at St Bartholomew's Hospital.

In 1955 she was appointed Senior Lecturer at the Middlesex Hospital. In 1968 she became a lecturer at the University of Aberdeen and was subsequently a Reader, then Honorary Research Fellow in Clinical Biochemistry there.

She was elected a Fellow of the Royal Society of Edinburgh (FRSE).
