= J. Jackson Clarke =

British pathologist and cancer researcher (1860–1940)

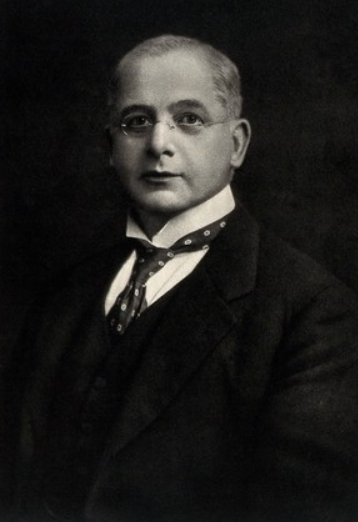
- Born: 3 February 1860; Lincoln, England
- Died: 4 December 1940
- Occupations: Pathologist, writer

James Jackson Clarke (3 February 1860 – 4 December 1940) F.R.C.S. was a British pathologist, surgeon and cancer researcher, best known for advocating a parasitic theory of cancer.

== Biography ==
Clarke was born in Lincoln. He was educated at Lincoln Grammar School and at St Mary's Hospital where he was awarded a senior scholarship in natural science, pathology and a prize in surgery. He obtained his M.R.C.S. in 1886, M.B. in 1888 and F.R.C.S. in 1890. He was house surgeon, house physician, pathologist and senior demonstrator of anatomy at St Mary's Hospital.

Clarke was clinical assistant at the Royal London Ophthalmic Hospital and a consulting surgeon to Hampstead and North-West London Hospital and to the Royal National Orthopaedic Hospital. He was an honorary secretary of the Harveian Society.

His best known work was his four volume Protozoa and Disease, which reviewed the evidence for protozoa as an agent in the production of disease. The first volume was positively reviewed and was considered one of the best on the subject. However, the second and third volumes were controversial as they advocated a parasitic theory as the cause of cancer.

Clarke's views about cancer had previously been severely criticized by other pathologists such as the Morbid Growths Committee of the Pathological Society of London as having no scientific foundation. Clarke believed that his protozoa theory of cancer should be examined by the medical community but was it criticized due to lack of evidence. A review in The British Medical Journal in 1912, commented that "authorities of the first rank" disagreed with many of Clarke's statements but concluded that his theory deserves a fair hearing.

In 1923, Clarke authored Protists and Disease. In this work he made a restatement of his case but revised some of his views as he came to the conclusion that the pathogenic organisms he described were not protozoa but protists allied to synchytriaceae. Clarke was convinced that "in molluscum we have an easy key to smallpox, the filtrable organisms and to cancer". A review in the Journal of the American Medical Association noted that "this evidence in favor of his view is wholly morphologic in nature, and is in no way convincing; nevertheless, the book will interest the students of the etiology of cancer and other problems of causation".

== Selected publications ==
- Post-Mortem Examinations in Medico-Legal and Ordinary Cases (1896)
- Surgical Pathology and Principles (1897)
- Protozoa and Disease (4 volumes, 1903, 1908, 1912, 1915)
- A Note on Syphilis and Cancer, Etc., and on Some Protozoa (The British Medical Journal, 1906)
- Cancer Problems (The British Medical Journal, 1907)
- Protists and Disease (1922)

== See also ==
- A. T. Brand
