= Eric Malcolm Fraser =

ICI executive and UK director-general of aircraft production in World War II (1896-1960)

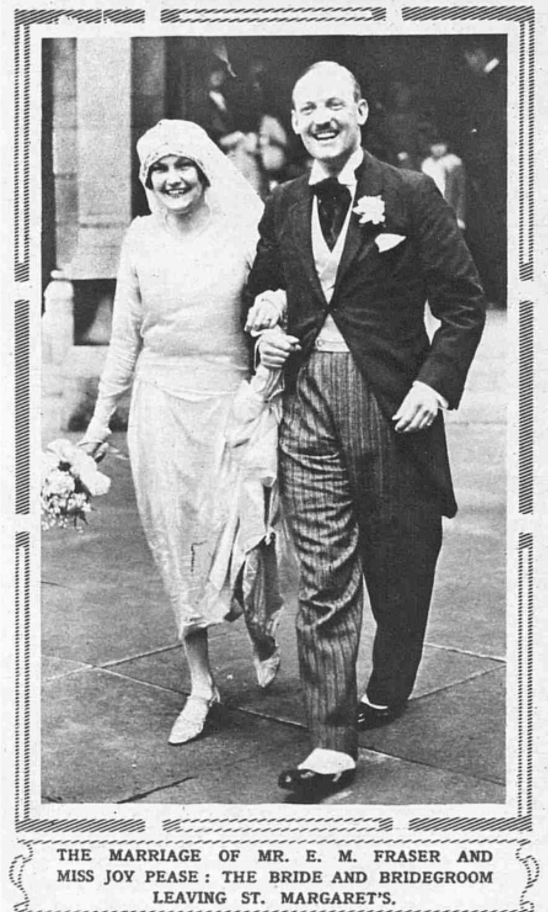
- Wedding of Eric Fraser and Joy Pease, 1929
- Born: 17 November 1896; Edinburgh, Scotland
- Died: 9 December 1960 (aged 64); London, England
- Education: Oriel College, Oxford
- Occupations: Businessman and civil servant
- Known for: Director-general of aircraft production during World War II; ICI executive
- Parent: Sir Thomas Fraser

Eric Malcolm Fraser CBE (17 November 1896 – 9 December 1960), was a British businessman and civil servant, who held a number of senior positions in the Ministry of Aircraft Production during the Second World War.

== Life ==
=== Early life ===
Fraser was born in Edinburgh, the son of Susanna Fraser (née Duncan) and Sir Thomas Fraser, a prominent physician and pharmacologist. The youngest of the family, he had three sisters and seven brothers, including Sir Francis Fraser who, like his father, became a leading medical researcher.

After attending Edinburgh Academy and Oriel College, Oxford, he joined the Army and in August 1915 was commissioned a second lieutenant in the Seaforth Highlanders. In July 1916, he joined the Seaforth's 8th Battalion in France. Here he was wounded on 11 September 1916, and mentioned in dispatches in December 1917. He retired from the Army in 1921 with the rank of captain.

=== Inter war career ===
In 1919, Fraser joined the chemical company Brunner Mond & Co as a manager, remaining when it merged with three other British chemical manufacturers to become Imperial Chemical Industries (ICI) in 1926. With 33,000 employees, ICI was one of the largest manufacturers in Britain, able to compete with the rest of the world's chemical producers.

=== World War II ===
On the outbreak of the Second World War a significant number of businessmen were seconded to the civil service, particularly in field of army supply. Fraser was part of this group, joining the War Office in 1939 as Assistant Director General of Progress and Statistics, then Director of Investigation and Statistics in 1940. Moving to the Ministry of Aircraft Production (MAP) in 1942, he became Director General of Equipment Production and, in April 1943, Director General of Aircraft Production, a post he held until the end of the war.

In MAP Fraser worked closely with the Minister of Aircraft Production who, from November 1942, was Sir Stafford Cripps, who worked well with Ministry staff. By 1942 aircraft production had rapidly expanded from a number of small innovative companies to be the largest industry in the country. MAP's role was to monitor and co-ordinate the activity of the industry to maximise output, particularly of bombers, and intervene to remove inefficiency and bad practice where necessary. MAP officials with previous experience in large industries, and who knew more about factories and production lines than ministers and permanent civil servants, played a key role in this work. While Fraser was Director General, Cripps developed Joint Production Consultation Committees, set up in each aircraft factory to allow an exchange of views between managers and workers. These mirrored ICI labour relations policies, which had already recognised works councils for a number of years.

In the 1946 King's Birthday Honours, Fraser was made a Commander of the Order of the British Empire for his services in MAP.

=== Post war ===
From 1946 until his retirement in 1958 Fraser was Sales Controller for ICI. He also served on a number of company boards and was a committee member of the Television Advisory Committee and the British Institute of Management.

=== Personal life ===
In May 1929 Fraser married Joy Frances Pease at St Margaret's Church, Westminster. They had no children. Living in Henley-on-Thames, Oxfordshire, Fraser retired from ICI in 1958 and died on 9 December 1960, aged 64, at the London Hospital, Stepney.

Fraser was a Freemason, initiated in the Royal Somerset House and Inverness Lodge No 4 (London) in June 1943, and later also a member of the Royal Somerset House and Inverness Chapter of Royal Arch Masonry.
