= Thomas Richard Fraser =

British physician and pharmacologist

Thomas Fraser
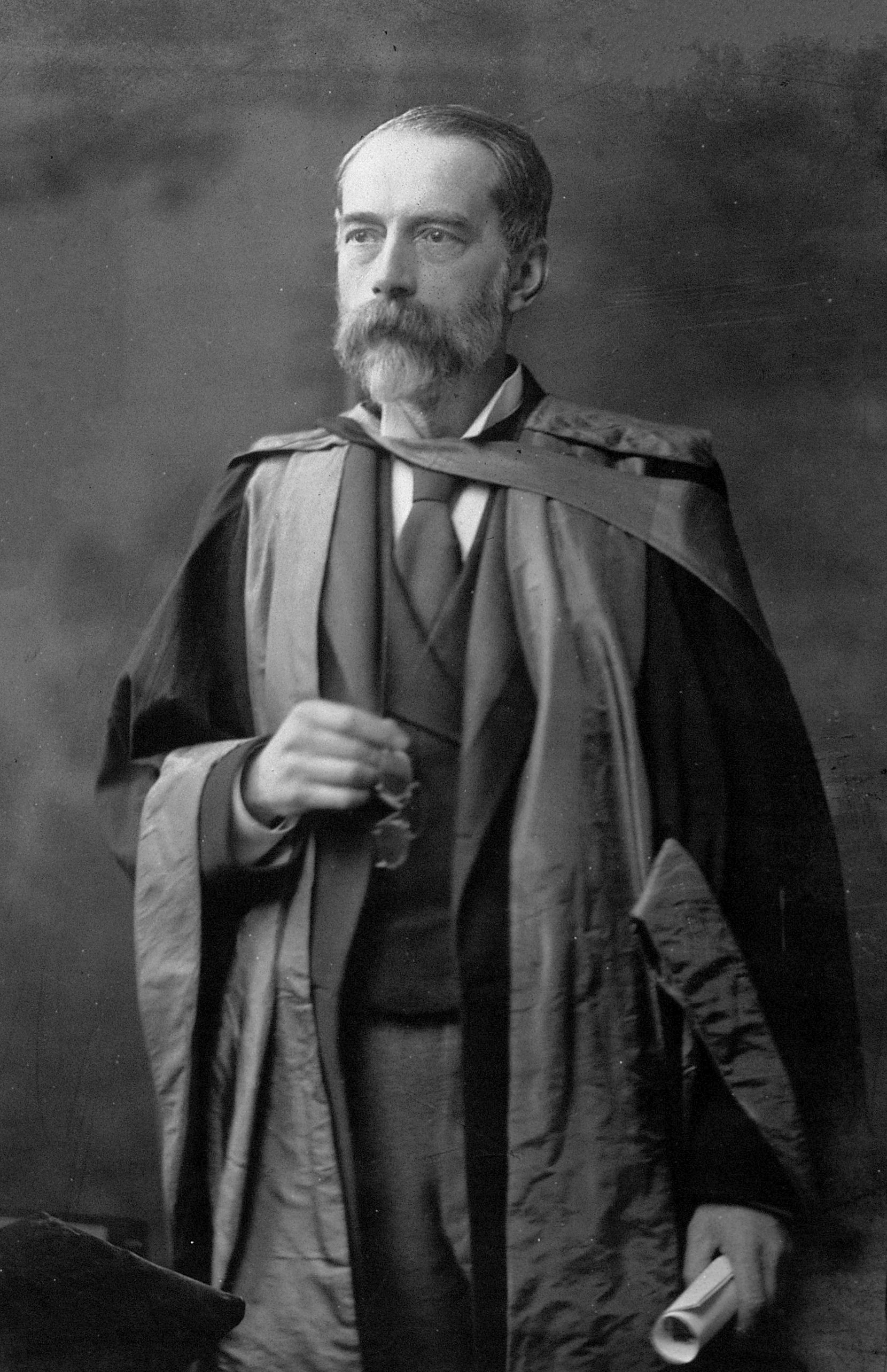
- A photograph of Fraser by Andrew Swan Watson
- Born: 5 February 1841; Calcutta, India
- Died: 4 January 1920 (aged 78); Edinburgh, Scotland
- Education: University of Edinburgh
- Awards: Keith Medal (1891-93); Cameron Prize for Therapeutics of the University of Edinburgh (1897)
- Scientific career
- Fields: pharmacology

Fraser in middle age

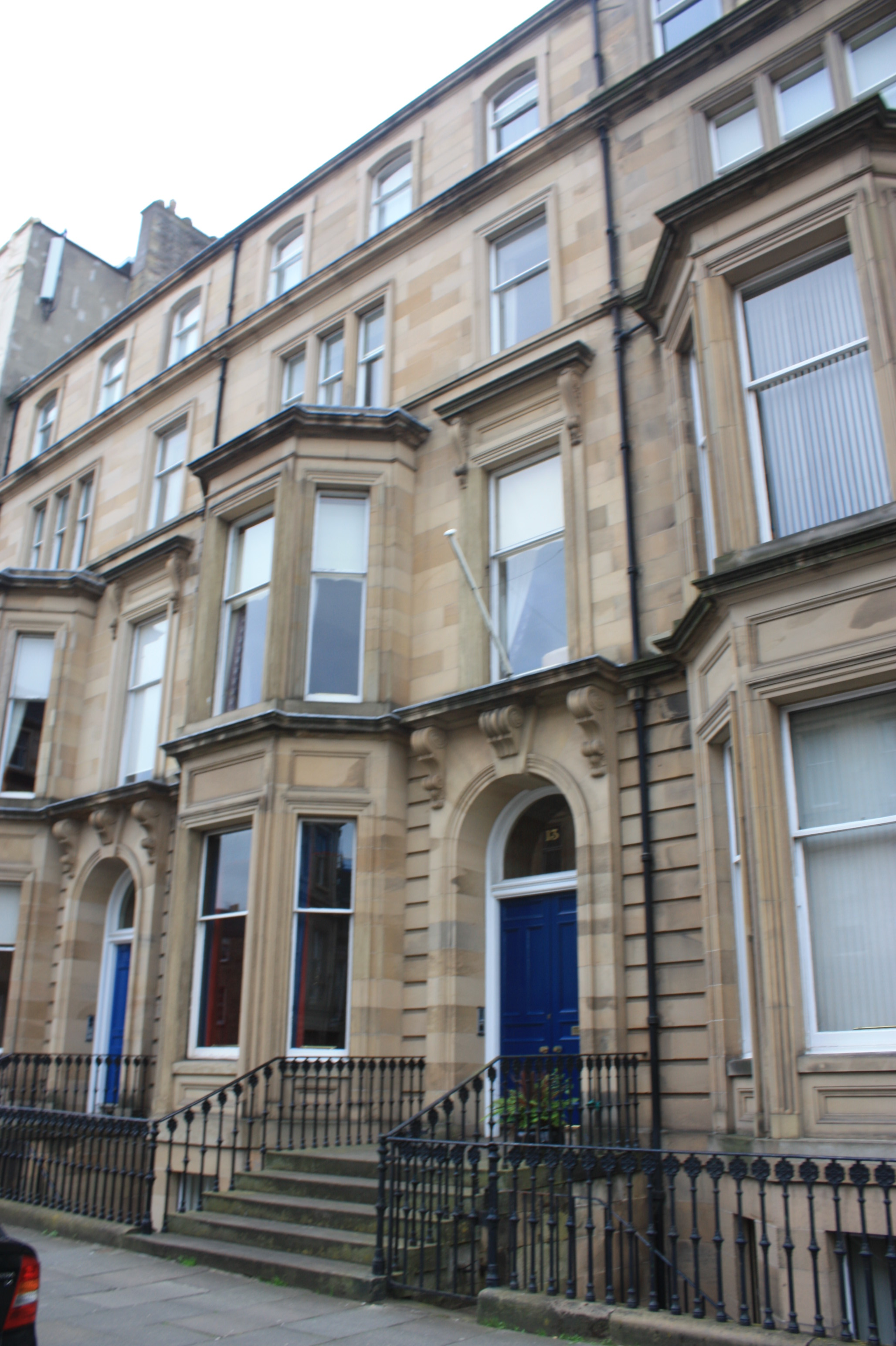
13 Drumsheugh Gardens, Edinburgh

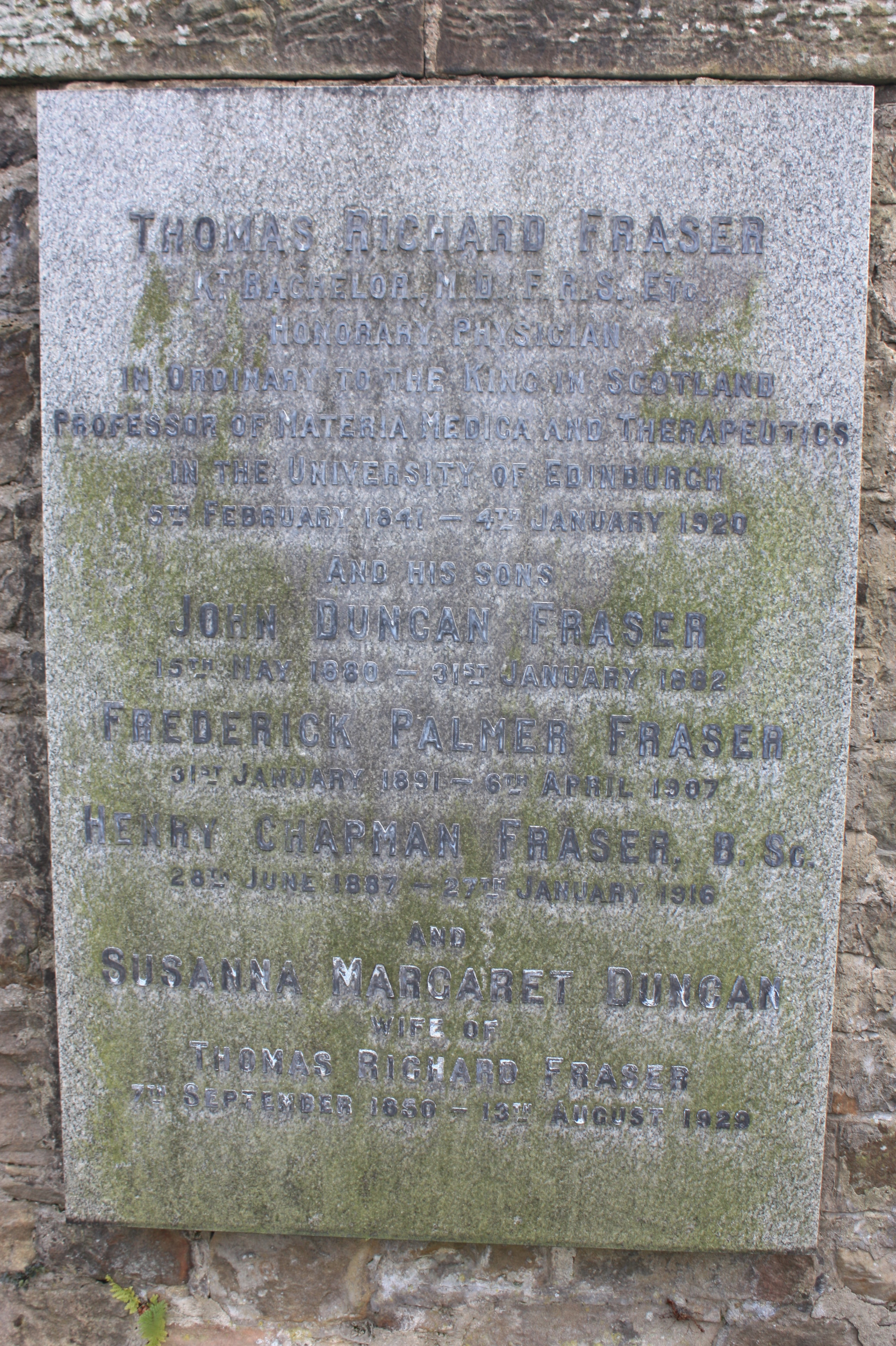
The grave of Thomas Richard Fraser, Dean Cemetery

Sir Thomas Richard Fraser FRS FRSE (5 February 1841 – 4 January 1920) was a British physician and pharmacologist. Together with Alexander Crum Brown he discovered the relationship between physiological activity and chemical constitution of the body.

== Life ==
He was born in Calcutta in India on 5 February 1841, the second son of Mary Palmer and John Richard Fraser, Indian civil servant.

Fraser attended the University of Edinburgh Medical School and graduated with an MD and gold medal in 1862. His award-winning thesis was based on the positive medical applications of physostigmine. This had been discovered by Sir Robert Christison in 1846 but its suggested uses were largely as a humane killing mechanism rather than as a medical tool.

In 1869, Fraser was a medical assistant professor at the Edinburgh Royal Infirmary. In 1877, he was a member of an Arctic expedition and later in 1877 was appointed professor of medicine at the University of Edinburgh, serving until 1918. In 1880 he was nominated Dean of the Medical Faculty.

In his later life he was both a consultant of insurance companies and of the Prisons Commission.

In 1867, he was elected a Fellow of the Royal Society of Edinburgh. His proposer was Sir Robert Christison. He served as the Society's Vice President from 1911 to 1916. He won the Society's Keith Prize for 1891-3 and its Makdougall-Brisbane Prize 1866-8. In 1877, he also was elected a Fellow of the Royal Society. In 1879 he was elected a member of the Aesculapian Club

In 1889 and 1890 he reported about an arrow poison used in coastal areas of Kenya and Nigeria and analysed the highly poisonous Calabar bean and Strophanthus hispidus. In 1897, he was awarded the Cameron Prize for Therapeutics of the University of Edinburgh. From 1898 to 1899 he was president of the Government Commission for the research on the plague in India. He served as President of the Royal College of Physicians of Edinburgh from 1900 to 1902. He was knighted in the 1902 Coronation Honours for his work on the Indian Plague Commission, receiving the accolade from King Edward VII at Buckingham Palace on 24 October 1902. In 1908 he was elected President of the Association of Physicians of Great Britain and Ireland. In 1914 he was elected President of the Harveian Society of Edinburgh.

He received honorary doctorates from the universities of Aberdeen (LLD), Glasgow (LLD), Edinburgh (LLD), Cambridge (DSc) and Dublin (MD).

In later years he lived at 13 Drumsheugh Gardens in Edinburgh's West End.

He died in Edinburgh on 4 January 1920. He is buried in Dean Cemetery in western Edinburgh, not far from his home. The grave lies in the south-west of the first northern extension, on the wall backing onto the original cemetery.

== Family ==
With his wife Susanna Margaret Duncan Fraser (1850–1929) they had three daughters and eight sons:

- Thomas, was given the middle name Christison in honour of the discoverer of Physostygmine
- Mary Susanna Fraser (1877–1956)
- George Moir Fraser (1878–1932)
- Gertrude Agnes Fraser (born 1882)
- John Duncan Fraser, died in infancy in 1882
- Lieutenant Commander William St John Fraser (1883–1915), was commander of the submarine E 10 when it was destroyed by enemy action in the North Sea near Heligoland with the loss of all hands
- Sir Francis Richard Fraser (1885–1964), also became a Professor of Materia Medica in Edinburgh
- Henry Chapman Fraser (1887–1916)
- Caroline Annie Fraser (1889–1966)
- Frederick Palmer Fraser (1891–1907) died young
- Eric Malcolm Fraser (1896–1960) who in 1943 was appointed Director-General of Aircraft Production in the Ministry of Aircraft Production

== Artistic recognition ==
His sketch portrait of 1884, by William Brassey Hole, is held by the Scottish National Portrait Gallery.

== Publications ==
- The antagonism between the actions of active substances; British Medical journal, 1872
- On The Physiological Action Of The Calabar Bean, Physostigma Venenosum Balf.; Transactions of the Royal Society of Edinburgh, XXIV, 1867
- On the connexion between chemical constitution and physiological action; ibidem XXV
- On Stropanthus hispidus; ibidem XXXV
- An investigation into some previously undescribed tetanic symptoms produced by atropia in cold-blooded animals
- Strophanthus hispidus: its Natural History, Chemistry and Pharmacology. Transactions of the Royal Society of Edinburgh, Vol. XXXV, 955–1028

Academic offices
Preceded by James Andrew	President of the Royal College of Physicians of Edinburgh; 1900–1902	Succeeded by Thomas Clouston
