= Royal Postgraduate Medical School =

Medical school in London, UK (1935–1988)

Coordinates: 51°31′3″N 0°14′1″W

The Royal Postgraduate Medical School (RPMS) was an independent medical school, based primarily at Hammersmith Hospital in west London. In 1988, the school merged with the Institute of Obstetrics & Gynaecology, and in 1997 became part of Imperial College School of Medicine.

== History ==
The medical school had its roots in the British Postgraduate Medical School, based at Hammersmith Hospital. It incorporated by Royal Charter in 1931 and opened in 1935. Its first director was Edinburgh Medical School graduate Francis Richard Fraser. It was the result of recommendations by the Athlone Report of 1921, and was a pioneer institution of postgraduate clinical teaching and research. The school had always been closely linked with the Hammersmith Hospital and the Medical Research Council, where its teaching research and clinical work were carried out. Senior academic staff of the school provided consultant services and academic leadership for Hammersmith Hospital. The RPMS has had an enormous influence on British medicine and had a major role in developing endocrine surgery in the UK.

The school became part of the British Postgraduate Medical Federation in 1947, and was known as the Postgraduate Medical School of London. In 1974 the school became independent, with a new charter and the title Royal Postgraduate Medical School. Its separate status ended in 1997 with its assimilation into Imperial College London. Hammersmith Hospital is now a district general hospital and is still a centre of postgraduate medical education and research, although its influence is much less than in the past.

== Controversy ==
An article entitled 'Human Guinea Pigs: A Warning' published in 1962 in the journal Twentieth Century by Maurice Pappworth highlighted many unethical practices regarding human experimentation at the postgraduate medical school. According to Pappworth, experiments had been carried out without valid consent on vulnerable patients, such as children and the mentally ill.

== See also ==
- Timeline of Imperial College School of Medicine
