= Francis Richard Fraser =

Scottish medical doctor

Sir Francis Richard Fraser (14 February 1885 – 2 October 1964) was born in Edinburgh, Scotland, to Sir Thomas Richard Fraser, the Professor of Materia Medica at the University of Edinburgh and member of the Royal Society, and Susanna Margaret Duncan. After attending Edinburgh Academy and Christ's College at Cambridge University, Fraser received his medical training from the University of Edinburgh, graduating in 1910 with M.B., Ch.B. He interned at the Royal Infirmary and the Hospital for Sick Children, both in Edinburgh.

In 1922, he received his M.D. from the University of Edinburgh Medical School. By chance, due to an illness of his father's, Fraser was asked to host a dinner in honor of Abraham Flexner. Flexner convinced Fraser to go to the Rockefeller Institute for Medical Research in the United States for his postgraduate work.

While in the United States, Fraser worked on poliomyelitis and electrocardiographs with Rufus Cole, Simon Flexner and Alfred E. Cohn at the Rockefeller. He then went on to work with W. T. Longcope at Presbyterian Hospital. When World War I broke out, Fraser joined up with the Harvard Unit and returned to England.

In 1920 Fraser became assistant director of the medical unit at Saint Bartholomew's Hospital (Bart's) in London. When Archibald Garrod left the position of director later that year to go to Oxford, Fraser was appointed to it. He remained at Bart's until 1934 when he was asked to become the first professor of medicine at the Postgraduate Medical School at Hammersmith Hospital.

In 1939, Fraser was asked to join the Emergency Medical Services and soon was appointed director general. For his work with the EMS and Hammersmith, Fraser was knighted in 1944.

At the close of World War II, Fraser resigned from Hammersmith to undertake the establishment of a British Postgraduate Medical Federation as its first director. The Federation loosely joined and established postgraduate medical schools and institutes in the London area. In 1960 Fraser retired from academic life.

== Family ==
In 1919, Fraser married Mary Claudine Stirling Fraser, daughter of Colin Dunlop Donald and widow of Captain John Alexander Fraser, Francis Fraser's first cousin. Mary Claudine had two daughters from the previous marriage, Alexandra Mary Agnes and Margaret Stirling, and with Francis Fraser had one son, Peter Basil Fraser.

== Sources ==
- Witness Seminar held at the Wellcome Institute for the History of Medicine, London, 9 June 1998.
- Journal of Experimental Medicine. March 1914, vol. 19, number 3
- Stuart-Harris, C. H. (1 May 1965). "Sir Francis Fraser". British Heart Journal. 27 (3): 449–452. doi:10.1136/hrt.27.3.449. PMC 503329. PMID 14284364.
