= Graeme K. Talboys =

- Born: Graeme Keith Talboys; 26 November 1953 (age 72); London, England
- Writing career
- Pen name: Greywind & John Charles Woodman
- Genres: Fiction and non-fiction

Graeme K. Talboys is an English writer and teacher.

== Life ==
Graeme Keith Talboys was born at Queen Charlotte's and Chelsea Hospital in Hammersmith on Thursday 26 November 1953.

== Writing ==
He is represented by Leslie Gardner of Artellus.

== Reception ==
Talboys was nominated for The Guardian's "Not the Booker Prize 2011."

In 2014, he was among 15 "mostly unagented writers" signed by HarperVoyager, the novels including his Exile and Pilgrim to be released digitally, followed by short-run paperback editions.

== Bibliography ==
=== Non-fiction ===
- Using Museums as an Educational Resource
- Museum Educator's Handbook
- Museum Educator's Handbook (Chinese language edition)
- the Voice within the Wind – of Becoming and the Druid Way (writing as Greywind)
- Aaargh!! to Zizz – 135 Drama Games
- the Path through the Forest – a Druid Guidebook (with Julie White)
- Arianrhod's Dance – a Druid Ritual Handbook (with Julie White)
- Way of the Druid
- The Druid Way Made Easy
- Paganism 101 by 101 Pagans (contributory essay)
- Putting the Fact in Fantasy (contributory essay)

=== Fiction ===
- Wealden Hill
- Storm Light sequence
- 1 - Thin Reflections
- 2 - The Mirror That Is Made
- 3a - Stormwrack (short stories illustrated by Carol Burns)
- The Chronicles of Jeniche of Antar
- 1 - Stealing into Winter
- 2 - Exile and Pilgrim
- 3 - Players of the Game
- 4 - Thunder on the Mountain
- 5 - In Wake of the Dead
- 6 - Dancing With Ghosts
- 7 - Return To Yesterday
- The Night Road (writing as John Charles Woodman)
- The Archives (inspired by the album of the same name by Omenopus)
- The Sleeping Swords

=== as editor ===
- First Class: Early Works of the Nearly Famous – Orchid Station

=== Projects involved with ===
- Into the Media Web by Michael Moorcock
- Sojan the Swordsman by Michael Moorcock (in Sojan the Swordsman/Under the Warrior Star by Michael Moorcock and Joe R. Lansdale)
