= Paddington General Hospital =

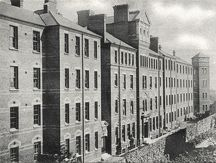
- Paddington Infirmary, later to become Paddington General Hospital

- Shown in Westminster

Geography
- Location: Harrow Road, Paddington, London, England
- Coordinates: 51.5231°N 0.1978°W

Organisation
- Care system: NHS England
- Type: General
- Affiliated university: Imperial College London

History
- Founded: 1886

Paddington General Hospital was a health facility in Harrow Road, Paddington, London.

== History ==
The hospital was established as an infirmary for the Paddington Union Workhouse and opened as the Paddington Infirmary in 1886. A nurses' home was completed in 1921. It was renamed Paddington Hospital in 1929 when it came under the administration of London County Council as part of reforms of the Local Government Act 1929. The medical superintendent overseeing the 630 bed hospital was Dr WG Bendle, MB. BS, RFCS (Edinburgh) and the matron was Miss GE Copeman. Matron Copeman was known nationally as the chairman of the Nurses Fund For Nurses, a charity for destitute, retired nurses. Matron Copeman had trained at St. Thomas' Hospital and was admitted to the General Nursing Council Register for Nurses in 1922.

Nurses' badges

With the inauguration of the National Health Service in 1948, the hospital was renamed Paddington General Hospital in 1954.

The facility was gradually integrated into St Mary's Hospital as St Mary's Hospital (Harrow Road) from 1968 and, after services had been completely transferred to St Mary's Hospital, the facility in Harrow Road closed in 1986. The hospital was subsequently demolished and the site was redeveloped for residential use with the Woodfield Road Surgery now being the only clinical presence remaining there.
