= A. T. Brand =

British physician and cancer researcher

Alexander Theodore Brand
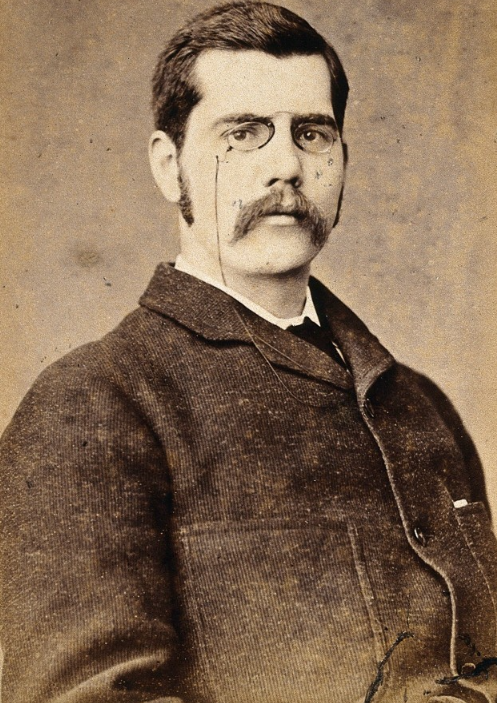
- Born: 1852; Chicago
- Died: 23 June 1934 (aged 81–82)
- Occupations: Physician, cancer researcher

Alexander Theodore Brand (1852 – 23 June 1934) was a British physician and cancer researcher.

Brand was born in Chicago of Scottish parentage. He graduated M.B, C.M. with honours from Aberdeen University in 1881. He started medical practice in Driffield in 1882 and obtained his M.D. in 1884. Brand practiced medicine for forty-five years, he retired in 1927. He was a member of the British Medical Association for over fifty years. He was President of the East Yorks and North Lincolnshire Branch during 1902–1903. Brand was a major in the Royal Army Medical Corps and commanded the No. 2 East Yorks Field Ambulance.

Brand took interest in studying the origin of cancer and promoted an infectious theory of cancer due to an undiscovered microorganism. He authored the book Cancer: Its Cause, Treatment and Prevention, in 1922 and often debated the origin of cancer with other physicians who disputed his theory in the British Medical Journal.

== Selected publications ==
- A Contribution to the Aetiology of Cancer (1902)
- The Etiology of Cancer (1902)
- The Exogenesis of Cancer (1903)
- Some Remarks on the Infectivity of Cancer (1907)
- Cancer: Its Cause, Treatment and Prevention (1922)
- Prevention of Cancer (1923)
