= Imperial College Healthcare NHS Trust =

NHS Trust based in London, England

- Type: NHS trust
- Established: 1 October 2007
- Headquarters: Paddington, London, England
- Hospitals: Charing Cross Hospital; Hammersmith Hospital; Queen Charlotte's and Chelsea Hospital; St Mary's Hospital; Western Eye Hospital
- Staff: 15,413 WTE (2023/24)
- Website: www.imperial.nhs.uk

Imperial College Healthcare NHS Trust is an NHS trust based in London, England. It is one of the largest NHS trusts in England and together with Imperial College London forms an academic health science centre.

The trust was formed in October 2007 by the merger of Hammersmith Hospitals NHS Trust and St Mary's NHS Trust and their integration with Imperial College Faculty of Medicine. It currently manages five hospitals: Charing Cross Hospital; Hammersmith Hospital; Queen Charlotte's and Chelsea Hospital; St Mary's Hospital and Western Eye Hospital. In 2019/20 Imperial College Healthcare had a turnover of £1.3 billion, employed approximately 13,000 people and treated about 1.3 million patients.

== History ==
Imperial College Healthcare was formed on 1 October 2007 by the merger of Hammersmith Hospitals NHS Trust and St Mary's NHS Trust with Imperial College London Faculty of Medicine. In July 2008, Imperial College Healthcare announced that it would be launching a pilot scheme to reward medical teams with bonuses for successful operations. In January 2009, the results of a study were published in which researchers had successfully captured MRI images of bleeding inside the hearts of 15 Imperial College Healthcare patients who had suffered a heart attack. In November 2009, a team led by Professor Paul Abel of Imperial College Healthcare performed the first removal of a rectal cancer using ultrasound. In 2009, Imperial College Healthcare Trust and Imperial College London become an academic health science centre. In 2013, interventional radiologists at the Trust used the Magellan Robotic System to treat fibroids in a world first. The Trust was designated a Genomic Medicine Centre in 2014. The same year, Hammersmith Hospital became the first in Europe to use a new heart mapping system to treat patients with complicated heart rhythm disorders. In a UK first in 2016, focused ultrasound was used at Charing Cross Hospital to treat essential tremor without brain surgery. The Trust featured in the debut series of Hospital on BBC Two in 2017, and was selected as a global digital exemplar for acute care in partnership with Chelsea and Westminster the same year. In 2019, a patient achieved a sustained remission from HIV-1 after ceasing antiretroviral treatment—becoming only the second in the world to do—after being treated with a stem cell transplant at Hammersmith Hospital. The treatment was offered to the so-called "London patient" as part of a collaboration by the stem cell transplant team at Imperial College London and HIV scientists at University College London.

== Organisation ==
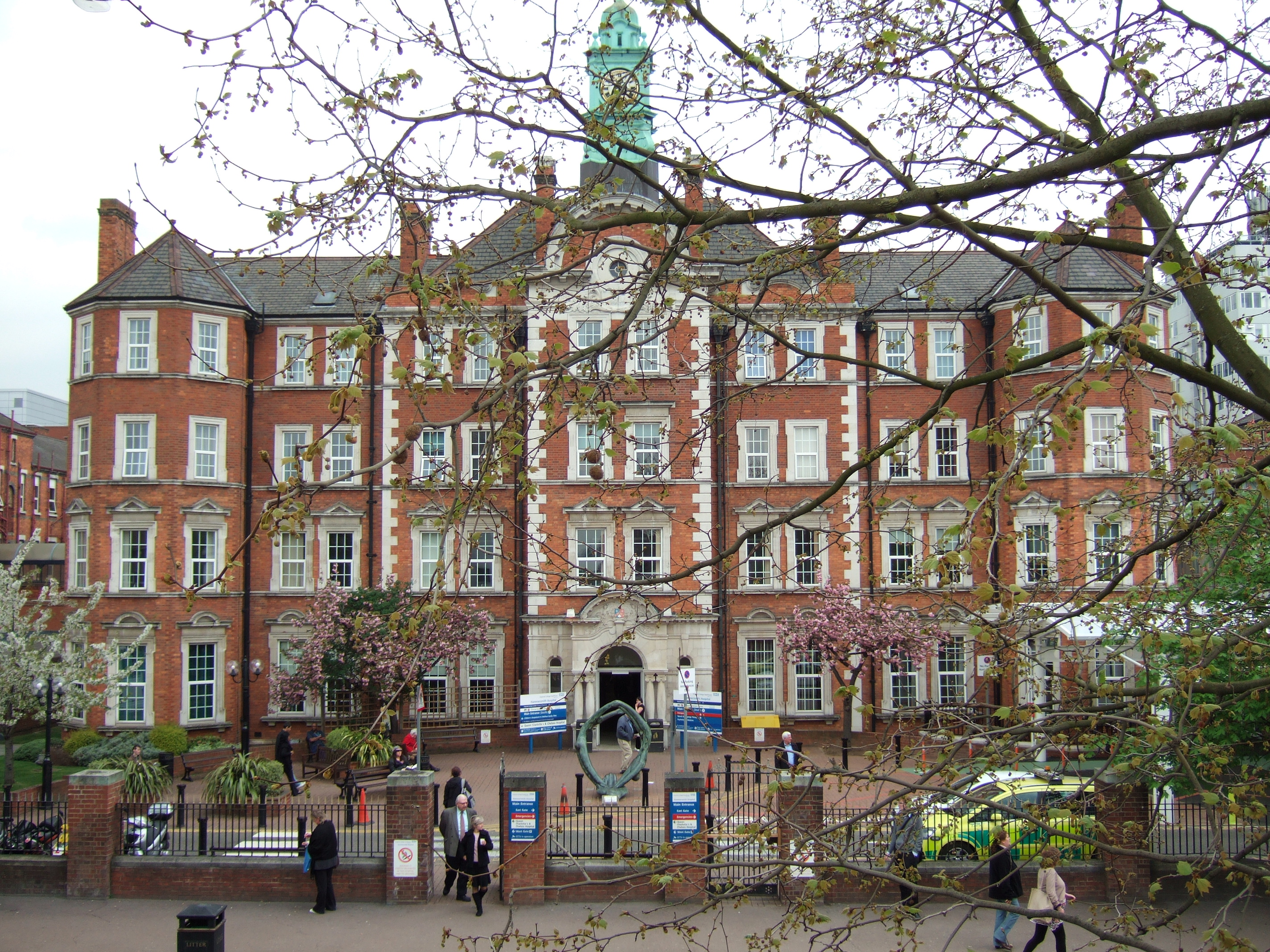
Hammersmith Hospital

Since 1 April 2026, the Trust has been part of the North West London Acute Provider Group, alongside Chelsea and Westminster Hospital NHS Foundation Trust, The Hillingdon Hospitals NHS Foundation Trust and London North West University Healthcare NHS Trust. The four trusts remain separate statutory organisations but share a group chief executive and a chair in common. Professor Tim Orchard, the Trust's chief executive since 2018, became the group's first chief executive and accountable officer on 1 April 2026. Professor Julian Redhead, previously the Trust's medical director, was appointed trust-level chief executive on an interim basis from the same date, reporting to the group chief executive.

The chair of the Trust was Lord Tugendhat from its inception in October 2007 until December 2011, when he was succeeded by Sir Richard Sykes. Matthew Swindells became chair in April 2022, as the first chair in common for the four acute trusts in north west London. He stepped down in March 2026, amid criticism relating to his role advising the US technology company Palantir Technologies. Bob Alexander was interim chair from 1 April to 31 October 2026. Dame Alwen Williams, former group chief executive of Barts Health NHS Trust, became chair on 1 November 2026.

=== Clinical structure ===
The clinical services of Imperial College Healthcare are organised into three divisions:

- Medicine and integrated care
- Surgery and cancer
- Women's, cardiac, clinical support and sexual health services

=== Finances ===
In 2012/13, Imperial College Healthcare achieved a year-end adjusted surplus of £9.0 million with a total income of £971.30 million, of which £752.725 million was from patient care activities and £218.549 million was from other operating revenue. In the same year it had operating expenses of £939.70 million and capital expenditure of £25.0 million.

As at 31 March 2013, it had total assets of £855.737 million, total assets less current liabilities of £687.395 million and total assets employed of £664.033 million.

Imperial College Healthcare ended 2015/16 in deficit of £47.9 million. This was partly as a result of changes to the NHS tariff. It reported that vacancies had reached one-sixth of the nursing workforce in July 2015.

In 2017/18, it predicted a deficit of £25.1 million and did not predict a full-year surplus until 2021/22. The total backlog maintenance bill had risen to £1.3 billion, the largest in the English NHS, and the trust had requested £131 million from NHS Improvement "to mitigate high and significant risk items". In 2022, although the outstanding maintenance bill had fallen to £736 million, it was still the largest in the English NHS.

In 2025, the Trust said the cost of removing its high-risk backlog maintenance on three of its sites was over £420 million. It planned capital spending of £115 million in 2025/26, including £25.2 million from the government's Estates Safety Fund. In February 2026, the Trust said it still had the largest backlog maintenance bill in the NHS, and that the cost had risen by 22.5% (£157 million) over the previous four years, compared with £104 million spent on reducing it over the same period.

In 2024/25, the Trust had total income of £1,875.5 million and reported an accounting deficit of £29.6 million. On the adjusted financial performance measure used by NHS England, which excludes items such as asset impairments, it recorded a surplus of £0.1 million. In 2025/26, total income rose to £2,029.7 million, with a statutory deficit of £41.6 million and an adjusted surplus of £4.9 million.

==== Overseas patients ====
The trust issued invoices to patients thought to be ineligible for NHS treatment totalling £6.7 million in 2018/19, but only collected £2.4 million.

==== Private income ====
The trust has opened a clinic in Dubai. It is one of the most commercial NHS trusts, increasing private income, mostly from general and maternity care, by 19% from 2014 to 2016. About 25% of patients using private services came from overseas. Its private care division generated £52.5 million in 2024/25 and £57.5 million in 2025/26.

=== Staff ===
At the end of 2025/26, the Trust employed 16,606 staff.

During 2019/20, the trust employed an average of 13,000 people:

- Doctors – 2,800
- Nurses and midwives – 5,100
- Allied health professionals – 800
- Scientists and technicians – 1,200
- Pharmacists – 150
- Medical students – 2,000
- Nurses in education, pre-registration – 640

Imperial College Healthcare was named by the Health Service Journal as one of the top hundred NHS trusts to work for in 2015. At that time it had 8,919 full-time equivalent staff and a sickness absence rate of 3.06%. 71% of staff recommended it as a place for treatment and 62% recommended it as a place to work.

==== Outsourcing dispute ====
In April 2020, over 1,000 Sodexo cleaners, caterers and porters working at the Trust's five hospitals were made NHS employees after months of campaigning by the United Voices of the World union. They had been severely underpaid in comparison to the NHS pay structure, and denied the sick pay, annual leave and pensions given to all NHS staff. Ten days of strike action and protests at St Mary's Hospital in October and November 2019 led to negotiations and the non-renewal of Sodexo's contract. A year later, the trust board decided the services, previously run by Sodexo, would remain in-house. The trust had already decided to spend an extra £4 million a year bringing hotel services staff up to the London Living Wage of £10.55 an hour.

=== Facilities ===
Imperial College Healthcare was one of the first trusts to introduce a comprehensive public Wi-Fi service, in 2015. The basic service is free for patients, visitors and staff. There is also a premium service which enables video and audio streaming.

On 1 June 2019, the Trust began a new five-year contract with Falck UK Ambulance Service to provide non-emergency patient transport services. Falck, who took over from DHL, were anticipated to complete 330,000 patient journeys in their first year.

In April 2020, the Trust became the first NHS trust to start using the Concentric digital informed consent application to support patients undergoing surgical treatment.

== Research ==
In partnership with Imperial College London, Imperial College Healthcare is a major centre for medical research. It is also part of one of eleven National Institute for Health and Care Research Biomedical Research Centres. The trust has one of the 11 Genomics Medicines Centres associated with Genomics England which opened across England in 2014. All the data produced in the 100,000 Genomes project will be made available to drugs companies and researchers to help them create precision drugs for future generations.

In 2016, Imperial College Healthcare set up a project with DeepMind to develop new clinical mobile apps linked to electronic patient records.

In 2018, researchers led by Professor George Hanna at St Mary's Hospital found that a simple breath test has been able to detect pancreatic cancer.

Imperial College Healthcare is one of the few NHS Trusts in England to have a Public Health Directorate (headed by Professor Azeem Majeed). The Directorate carries out research in collaboration with the Imperial College School of Public Health.

== Performance ==
The trust was one of 26 responsible for half of the national growth in patients waiting more than four hours in accident and emergency over the 2014/15 winter.

At the end of March 2017, the trust was confirmed as one of four additional NHS Global Digital Exemplars; joining the twelve announced in September 2016. The trust shares its GDE status with Chelsea and Westminster Hospital NHS Foundation Trust as a "joint Exemplar".

In 2019/20, the Trust performed 38,000 operations and saw 305,000 emergency attendees.

== See also ==
- List of NHS trusts
