= Minister of Aircraft Production =

British government minister; 1940–1945

The Minister of Aircraft Production was, from 1940 to 1945, the British government minister at the Ministry of Aircraft Production, one of the specialised supply ministries set up by the British Government during World War II. It was responsible for aircraft production for the British forces, primarily the Royal Air Force, but also the Fleet Air Arm.

== History ==
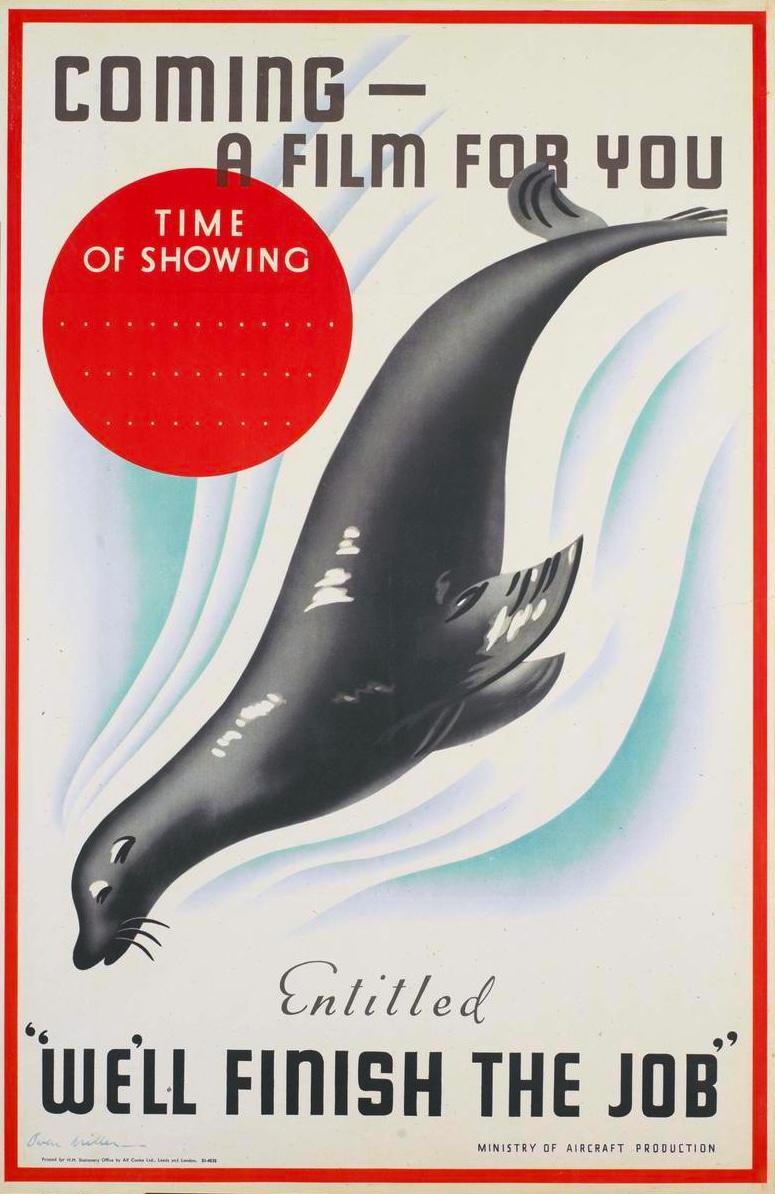
A Ministry of Aircraft Production film poster

During the war, British aircraft production quickly expanded to be the largest industry in the country, involving hundreds of private firms and employing nearly two million workers. The Ministry was set up to co-ordinate the activity of this industry to maximise aircraft production. There was a headquarters in London and twelve regions, each with a controller and resident Ministry representatives in most of the larger factories.

The department was formed in May 1940 by the Prime Minister, Winston Churchill, to produce large numbers of aircraft to fight the Battle of Britain. The first minister was Lord Beaverbrook; under his control the Ministry presided over an enormous increase in British aircraft production. Initially under the personal direction of the Minister, for a time it operated from his private home. The initial Chief Executive of the Ministry was Air Chief Marshal Sir Wilfrid Freeman, who left after frustrations with Lord Beaverbrook's working methods but returned in October 1942 and served until 1945. The Director-General of Aircraft Production from April 1943 was Eric Fraser, who remained the most senior non-elected figure in the department. Fraser, whose pre-war career had been with Imperial Chemical Industries, was first appointed director-general of equipment production, before moving to the aircraft production post, which he held throughout the rest of the war. In 1945, Ben Lockspeiser was appointed director-general.

=== Beaverbrook ===
The first minister, Lord Beaverbrook, pushed for aircraft production to have priority for raw materials over virtually all other types of munitions production. This was needed in the summer and autumn of 1940 but it distorted the supply system of the war economy. It eventually came to be replaced by a quota system, with each supply ministry being allocated a certain amount of raw materials imports to be distributed amongst various projects within the ministries' purviews. Beaverbrook continued to push hard for increases in aircraft production until he left to become Minister of Supply. Controversially, under Beaverbrook's tenure the aircraft programmes set bore little relation to expected aircraft production. Beaverbrook deliberately inserted an extra margin of 15 per cent over and above the very best that British industry could be expected to produce. The extra margin was added to provide an out-of-reach target to British industry so that it would push as hard as possible to increase production.

The ministry was characterised by, for its time, highly unorthodox methods of management, including its initial location at Beaverbrook's home, Stornoway House. Personnel were recruited from outside the Air Ministry, interaction was informal, characterised by personal intervention, crisis management and application of willpower to improve output. "Few records were kept, the functions of most individuals were left undefined and business was conducted mainly over the telephone". One important change made within days of the creation of the ministry was it taking over the RAF's storage units and Maintenance Units which were found to have accepted 1,000 aircraft from the industry but issued only 650 to squadrons. These management and organisational changes bore results almost immediately; in the first four months of 1940, 2,729 aircraft were produced of which 638 were fighters, while in the following four months crucial to the Battle of Britain during May to August 1940, production rose to 4,578 aircraft, of which 1,875 were fighters.

This production rate achieved was two and a half times German fighter production and the ministry repaired and returned to service nearly 1,900 aircraft. The result of this effort and management style was that while the number of German fighters available for operations over England fell from 725 to 275, the RAF's complement rose from 644 at the beginning of July 1940 to 732 at the beginning of October. Beaverbrook left the ministry at the end of April 1941. He was succeeded by John Moore-Brabazon, who was replaced in February 1942 by John Llewellin, who served until November 1942.

=== Stafford Cripps ===
Sir Stafford Cripps became the Minister of Aircraft Production on 22 November 1942, serving for two and a half years until the end of the war in Europe. He made a number of changes, including replacing unrealistic production targets, deliberately set too high to encourage effort, with realistic forecasts for each type of aircraft. Production levels were maintained at over 2,000 aircraft a month, with the number of heavy bombers – a priority – doubling to a monthly average of 458 by 1944. Production Efficiency Boards were established to monitor production and remove inefficiency with, in extreme cases, the ministry taking direct control of factories. Joint Production Committees were set up in each factory to aid an exchange of views between management and workers, with Cripps making over five hundred visits to factories in order to meet staff. Cripps left the ministry on 23 May 1945 when the wartime coalition ended.

=== Post-war dissolution ===
In May 1945 Ernest Brown, leader of the National Liberals was appointed the final Minister of Aircraft Production. In August 1945 the Ministry was abolished and a minister with responsibility for both aircraft production and the Ministry of Supply was appointed and the Ministry of Aircraft Production was fully merged into the Ministry of Supply on 1 April 1946.

== Ministers of Aircraft Production, 1940–1945 ==
- Max Aitken, 1st Baron Beaverbrook (14 May 1940 – 1 May 1941)
- John Moore-Brabazon (1 May 1941 – 22 February 1942)
- John Llewellin (22 February – 22 November 1942)
- Sir Stafford Cripps (22 November 1942 – 25 May 1945)
- Ernest Brown (25 May – 26 July 1945)

== See also ==
- Queen Mary trailer
- Churchill War Ministry
- Coalition Government 1940–1945
- Ministry of Aviation (Nazi Germany)

== Bibliography ==
- Clarke, Peter (2002). The Cripps Version. London: Allen Lane. The Penguin Press. ISBN 0-713-99390-1.
- Cooke, Colin (1957). The Life of Richard Stafford Cripps. London: Hodder & Stoughton. OCLC 221274659.
- Edgerton, David (2006). Warfare State Britain, 1920–1970. London: Cambridge University Press. ISBN 978-0-521-85636-2.
- Estorick, Eric (1949). Stafford Cripps. A biography. London: William Heinemann. OCLC 400539.
- Johnson DFC, Thomas Everard (1992). The First 100 Years, 1892–1992. London: Royal Somerset House & Inverness Chapter of Royal Arch Freemasons.
- Law, M. D. (1961). "Aircraft Production, Ministry of". Chambers's Encyclopædia. Vol. I. London: Newnes. OCLC 841700727.
- Ponting, Clive (1990). 1940: Myth and Reality. London: Hamish Hamilton. ISBN 978-0-241-12668-4.
