= Alwen Williams =

UK health service chief executive

Dame Alwen Williams DBE was Chief Executive of the Barts Health NHS Trust in London, England 2015 - 2022.

== Career ==
Alwen Williams worked within the National Health Service in England in managerial roles from 1980 until 2022.

From 2004 she was the Chief Executive of several NHS Trusts, starting with Tower Hamlets Primary Care Trusts, moving on to the East London and the City Alliance of Primary Care Trusts in 2009 then the NHS East London and the City in 2011. In 2013 she took a national role as director of delivery and development for the NHS Trust Development Authority. In October 2015 she became the chief executive of the Barts Health NHS Trust in London, which had been placed in 'special measures' because of deficiencies. By 2020 she had led it so that most services were rated 'good' or 'outstanding' and the financial situation had stabilised.

In March 2020, in an early and rapid response to the COVID-19 pandemic, Williams led development of an additional 600 intensive care beds within four hospitals, changing to having out-patients seen remotely whenever possible and planning to use the 'Nightingale' hospital in the ExCel Conference Centre, London if further beds were necessary. As well as installing new equipment and some building work, this required re-training of some hospital staff.

She retired from the NHS in 2022.

== Honours ==
She was appointed Commander of the Order of the British Empire (CBE) in 2009 and promoted to Dame Commander of the same Order (DBE) in the 2021 New Year Honours for services to leadership in the NHS. In 2023 she received an honorary doctorate from the University of East London
