= Western Eye Hospital =

- Imperial College Healthcare NHS Trust
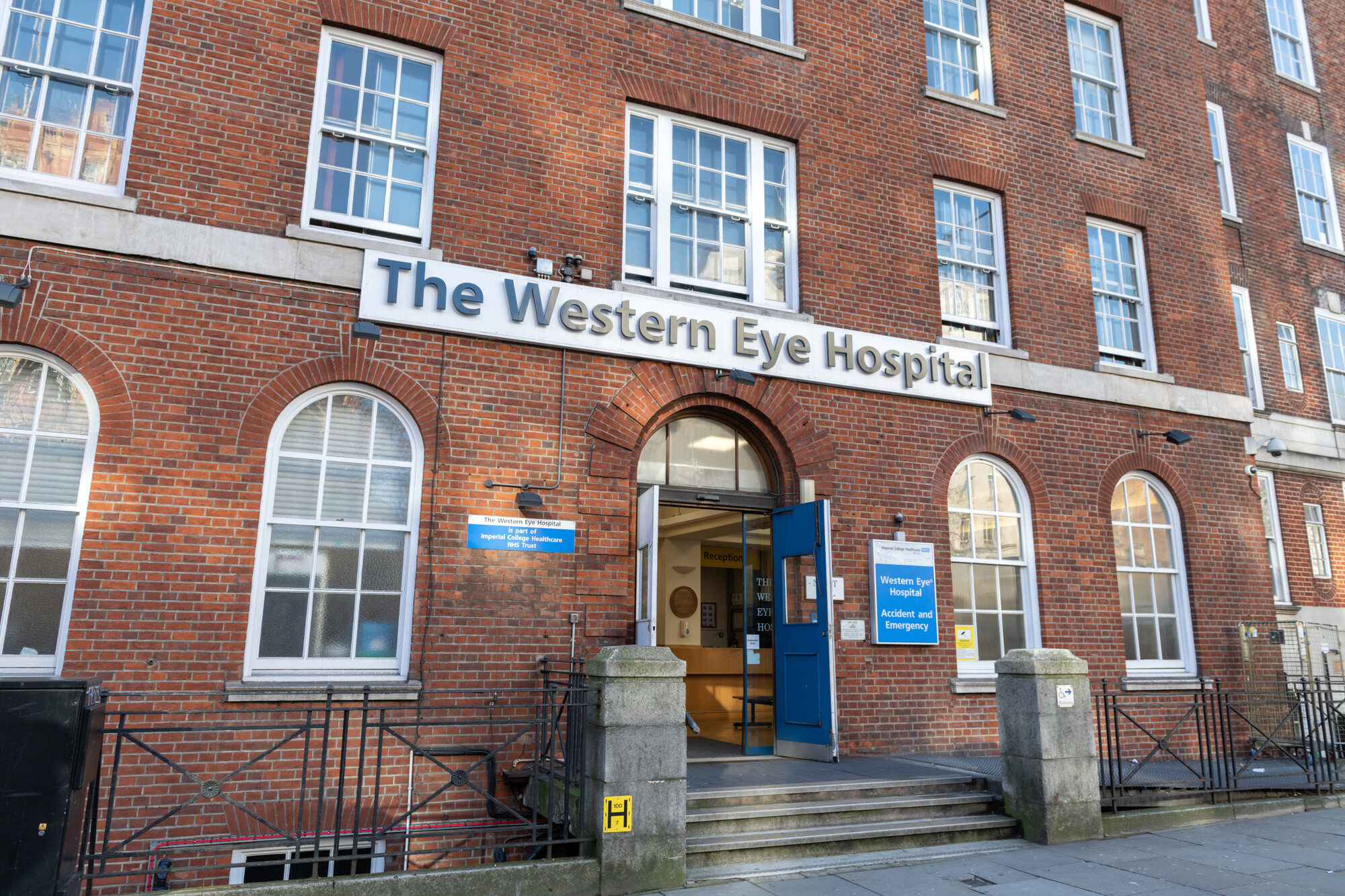

- Location within Westminster

Geography
- Location: Marylebone Road, London, England, United Kingdom
- Coordinates: 51.5208°N 0.1635°W

Organisation
- Care system: National Health Service
- Type: Specialist

Services
- Emergency department: Yes Accident & Emergency
- Speciality: Ophthalmology

History
- Founded: 1856

Links
- Website: www.imperial.nhs.uk/our-locations/western-eye-hospital
- Lists: Hospitals in England

Western Eye Hospital is an ophthalmology hospital in central London. It is managed by the Imperial College Healthcare NHS Trust.

== History ==
The hospital was founded by Henry Obre and John Woolcott, both surgeons at St John's Place in Lisson Grove as the St Marylebone Eye and Ear Institution in 1856. It moved to a larger facilities in Marylebone Road in 1860, and an out-patients department was opened by the Marquess of Ripon in 1904. After the existing building at Marylebone Road became very dilapidated, a new purpose-built facility was built on the same site and opened in March 1930. It joined the National Health Service in 1948 and was renamed the Western Eye Hospital in 1993.

The former Samaritan Hospital for Women is located next door, and though largely disused is utilised to provide estates and facilities support for the adjoining Western Eye Hospital.

== Facilities ==
The hospital operates a daily emergency department for ambulance and walk-in cases. It features a minor surgical theatre, a triage system and three ophthalmic operating theatres. It treats a wide range of eye conditions from glaucoma, cataract, retinal tears, to wet age-related macular degeneration (AMD), a major cause of blindness.

== Alumni and staff ==
- Bashar al-Assad - former President of Syria (attended postgraduate studies at the Western Eye Hospital, specializing in vitreoretinal ophthalmology). There, al-Assad's consultant supervisor remarked: "He was an extremely kind person and a warm personality", while a nurse stated that he was "calm at the operating table and had a wonderful manner with the patients... He spoke with every patient just before surgery to reassure them all would be well."

== See also ==
- List of hospitals in England

== Sources ==
- Leverett, Flynt L. (2005). Inheriting Syria: Bashar's Trial By Fire. Brookings Institution. ISBN 978-0-8157-5204-2.
