= Samaritan Hospital for Women =

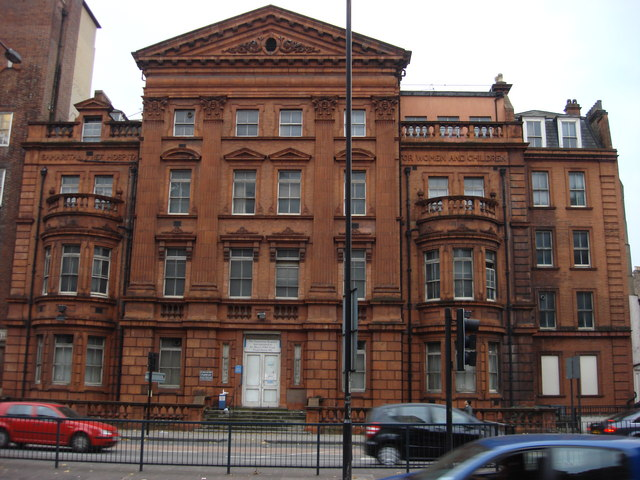
- Samaritan Hospital for Women

- Shown in Westminster

Geography
- Location: Marylebone Road, London, England
- Coordinates: 51.5212°N 0.1630°W

Organisation
- Care system: NHS England
- Type: Women's health

Services
- Emergency department: No

History
- Founded: 1847; 179 years ago
- Closed: 1997

The Samaritan Hospital for Women was a hospital in Marylebone Road, London, UK. It is a Grade II listed building.

== History ==
The hospital had its origins in the Gynaepathic Institute which was founded by Dr William Jones in Manchester Square in January 1847. The institute moved to North Audley Street in March 1847 and became the Free Hospital for Women and Children and Samaritan Institution in February 1848. It moved again, this time to Orchard Street as the Free Hospital for Women and Children in March 1850 and then to Lower Seymour Street with the same name in 1858.

The foundation stone for a purpose-built hospital in Marylebone Road was laid by the Prince of Wales in July 1889. The new facility was designed by W. G. Habershon and J. F. Fawkner and it opened in October 1889. It became the Samaritan Free Hospital for Women in 1904 and, after joining the National Health Service as the Samaritan Hospital for Women in 1948, it closed in 1997. The building is largely disused and, since closure, has fallen into disrepair. In 2017 the owners of the site, Imperial College Healthcare NHS Trust, stated in response to a Freedom of Information request that the building was still in use, to "provide estates and facilities support for the adjoining Western Eye Hospital"
