= Hammersmith Hospital =

London teaching hospital

Coordinates: 51°30′59″N 0°14′13″W

- Imperial College Healthcare NHS Trust
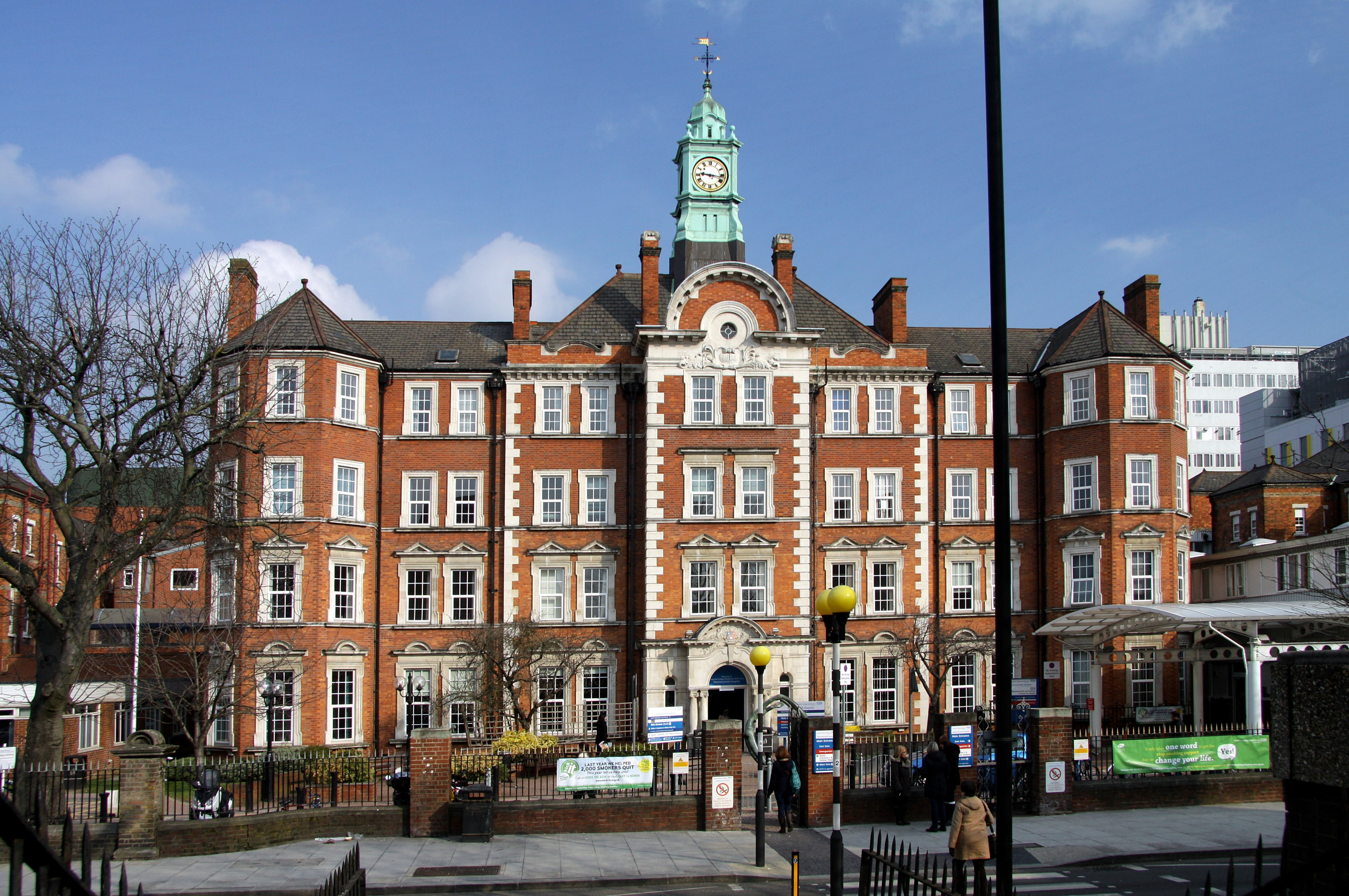
- Hammersmith Hospital in 2013

Geography
- Location: 72 Du Cane Road; London; W12 0HS

Organisation
- Care system: NHS England
- Type: Teaching
- Affiliated university: Imperial College London

Services
- Emergency department: Urgent Care Only
- Beds: 349

History
- Founded: 1902; 124 years ago

Links
- Website: imperial.nhs.uk/our-locations/hammersmith-hospital

Hammersmith Hospital, formerly the Military Orthopaedic Hospital, and later the Special Surgical Hospital, is a major teaching hospital in White City, West London. It is part of Imperial College Healthcare NHS Trust in the London Borough of Hammersmith and Fulham, and is associated with the Imperial College Faculty of Medicine. Confusingly, the hospital is not in Hammersmith, but is located in White City, adjacent to Wormwood Scrubs and East Acton.

== History ==
=== Origins ===
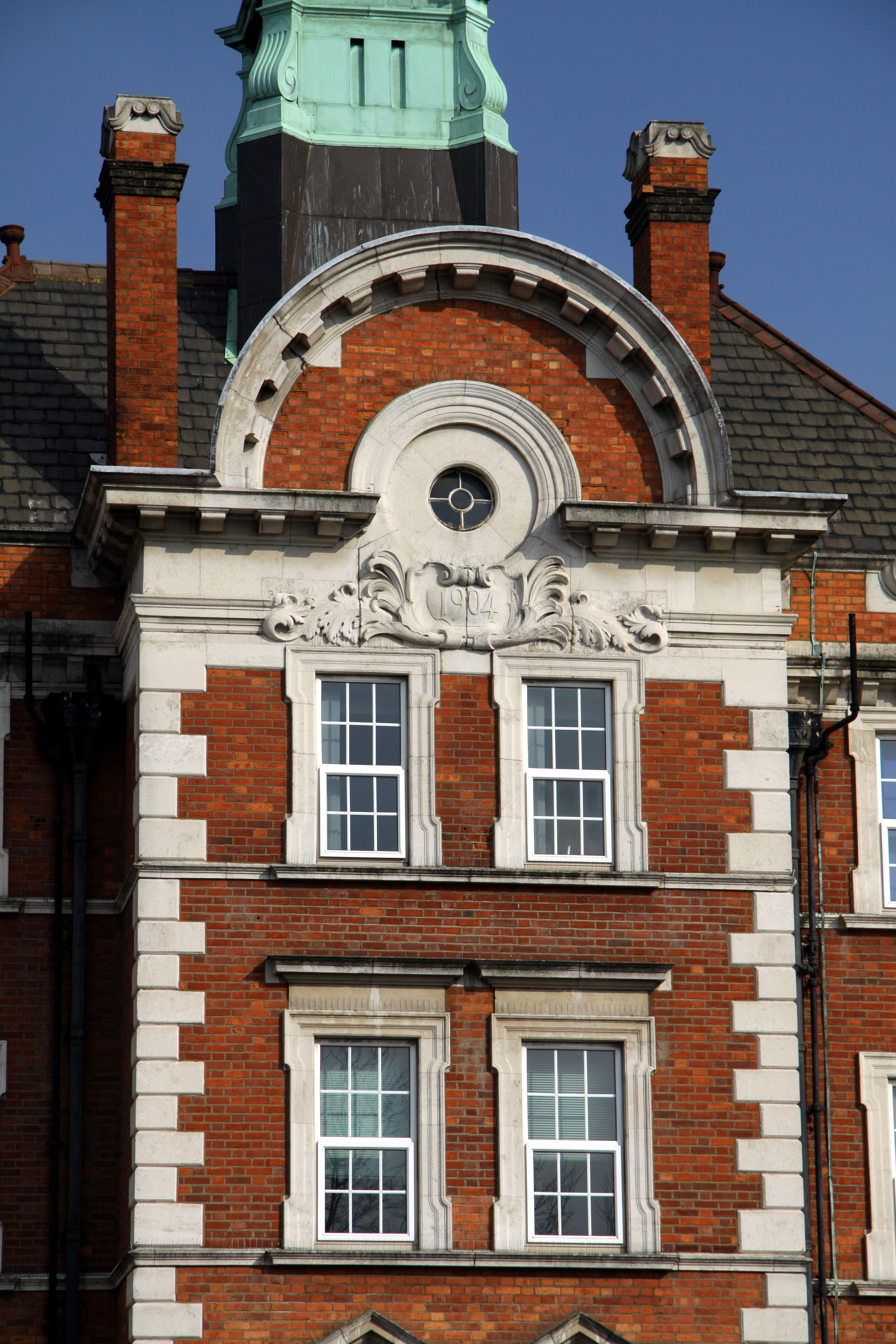
Details of the hospital's architecture.

The hospital's origins begin in 1902, when the Hammersmith Poor Law Guardians decided to erect a new workhouse and infirmary on a 14-acre (5.7 ha) site at the north side of Du Cane Road somewhat to the north of Shepherd's Bush. The land, adjacent to Wormwood Scrubs Prison, was purchased for £14,500 from the Ecclesiastical Commissioners. A temporary corrugated iron building was erected on the site in 1902 to provide care for victims of a smallpox epidemic that had taken place in the winter of 1901–2. The buildings were designed by the firm of Giles, Gough and Trollope.

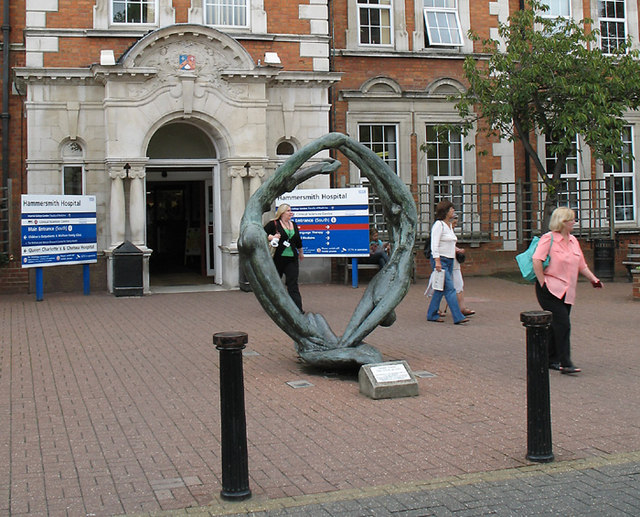
Art work near main hospital entrance.

=== First World War ===
In February 1916, during the First World War, the patients were moved to other establishments and the site was taken over by the War Office for use as the Military Orthopaedic Hospital, to care for wounded soldiers, largely thanks to the efforts of the noted surgeon Robert Jones. At that time the Joint War Committee awarded the hospital the sum of £1,000 to begin its work, soon followed in 1918 by a further grant of £10,000. The hospital was also supported by donations from the public. Part of the rehabilitation process involved putting the recovering patients to work in local shops, a policy which does not appear to have been entirely popular among the soldiers themselves.

=== Inter-war era ===
Later it was renamed the Special Surgical Hospital, and in 1919 became the Ministry of Pensions Hospital. In April 1925 demands by the Hammersmith Guardians for return of their property finally succeeded and the site became Hammersmith Hospital. By 1930, the infirmary could accommodate 300 patients and was taken over by the London County Council. At the time of transfer to the London County Council the medical Superintendent was AD Morris (acting) MD MRCP RSC MRCS, the Steward was JW Deane and MIss E M Northover RRC (Royal Red Cross) was Matron.

Badges for nurses who trained at the hospital

=== Second World War ===
During the Second World War the hospital amassed expertise on the effects of crush syndrome and kidney failure as a result of treating air raid victims. The hospital refectory was completely destroyed during one air raid. Roger Daltrey, the singer and actor, was born at the hospital in 1944.

The hospital was home to the first medical linear accelerator in the world at the MRC's Radiotherapeutic Research Unit, where the first patient was treated in 1953. The Commonwealth Building, which included the postgraduate medical school, the Wellcome Library and some research departments, was opened by the Queen in May 1966.

=== Modern era ===
Until 1997 the hospital was the home of the Royal Postgraduate Medical School, which then became part of Imperial College. The Institute of Reproductive and Developmental Biology (IRDB) was established by Professor Lord Winston on the site in 2001. In October 2007 Imperial College Healthcare and Imperial College formed the first academic health science centre from resources that included the academic expertise of Hammersmith Hospital and St Mary's Hospital. In April 2024, Hammersmith Hospital had announced a pilot six-month trial intended to improve kidney transplant outcomes, by matching white blood cell types with donors.

== Facilities ==
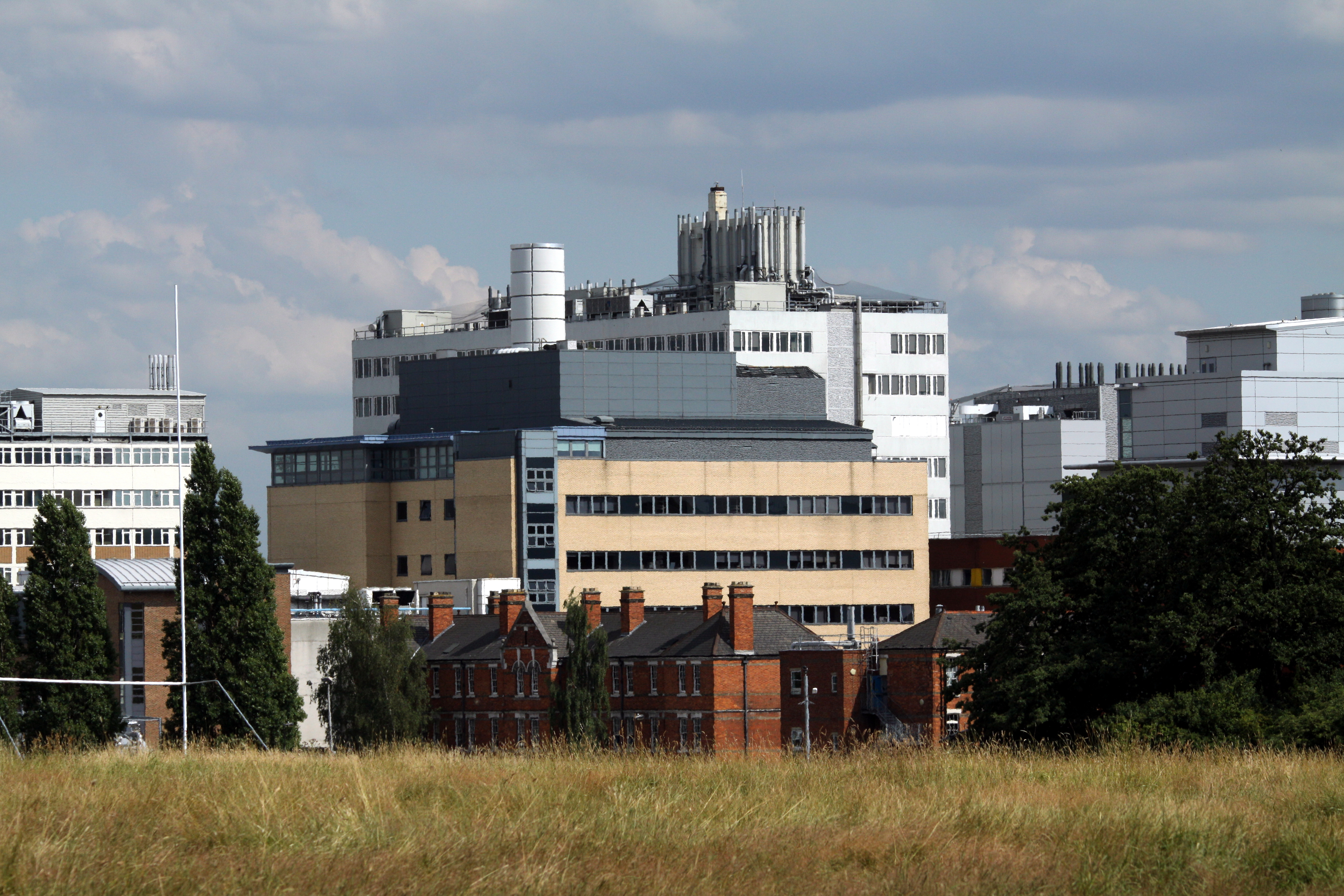
Hammersmith Hospital from Wormwood Scrubs Park

Hammersmith Hospital is internationally renowned for clinical research. Its clinical reputation was built on the treatment of medical conditions, notably of the heart and kidney. It is also famous for its significant role in creating the specialty of Endocrine surgery (the first international course on Endocrine Surgery was held here by Professors Selwyn Taylor and Richard Welbourn in 1971). Its services now include the Heart Attack Centre (Primary PCI Centre) for North West London, a leukaemia wing (The Catherine Lewis Centre) the Department of Thyroid and Endocrine Surgery (serving North West London and pan-UK referrals and hosting the Selwyn Taylor Fellow) and the West London Renal and Transplant Centre. The Medical Research Council (MRC) also has a major presence at Hammersmith Hospital through the MRC Laboratory of Medical Sciences, providing a strong foundation for clinical and scientific research, with extensive research and development of imaging techniques.

Hammersmith's accident and emergency unit closed in 2014, to be replaced by 24-hour urgent care centers. Patients suspected of having a heart attack would still be taken to Hammersmith, which had one of London's eight heart attack centers. Protests over the change were held outside Hammersmith Hospital, with members of the London Assembly voicing opposition. A spokesperson for the Imperial College Healthcare Trust stated the change was to consolidate emergency care services in other hospitals, as part of the government's Shaping a Healthier Future program. St. Mary's Hospital was chosen to take Hammersmith Hospital's future accident and emergency department patients when it closed in September 2014.

In 2023, the BBC reported that Health Secretary Steve Barclay had potentially misled parliament by saying that a refurbishment of Hammersmith Hospital was being carried out. He stated the hospital was having a rehabilitation cardiac hub being built, which the Imperial College Healthcare NHS Trust, the hospital's manager, denied.

== See also ==
- List of hospitals in England
