= Michael Hargrave =

British physician

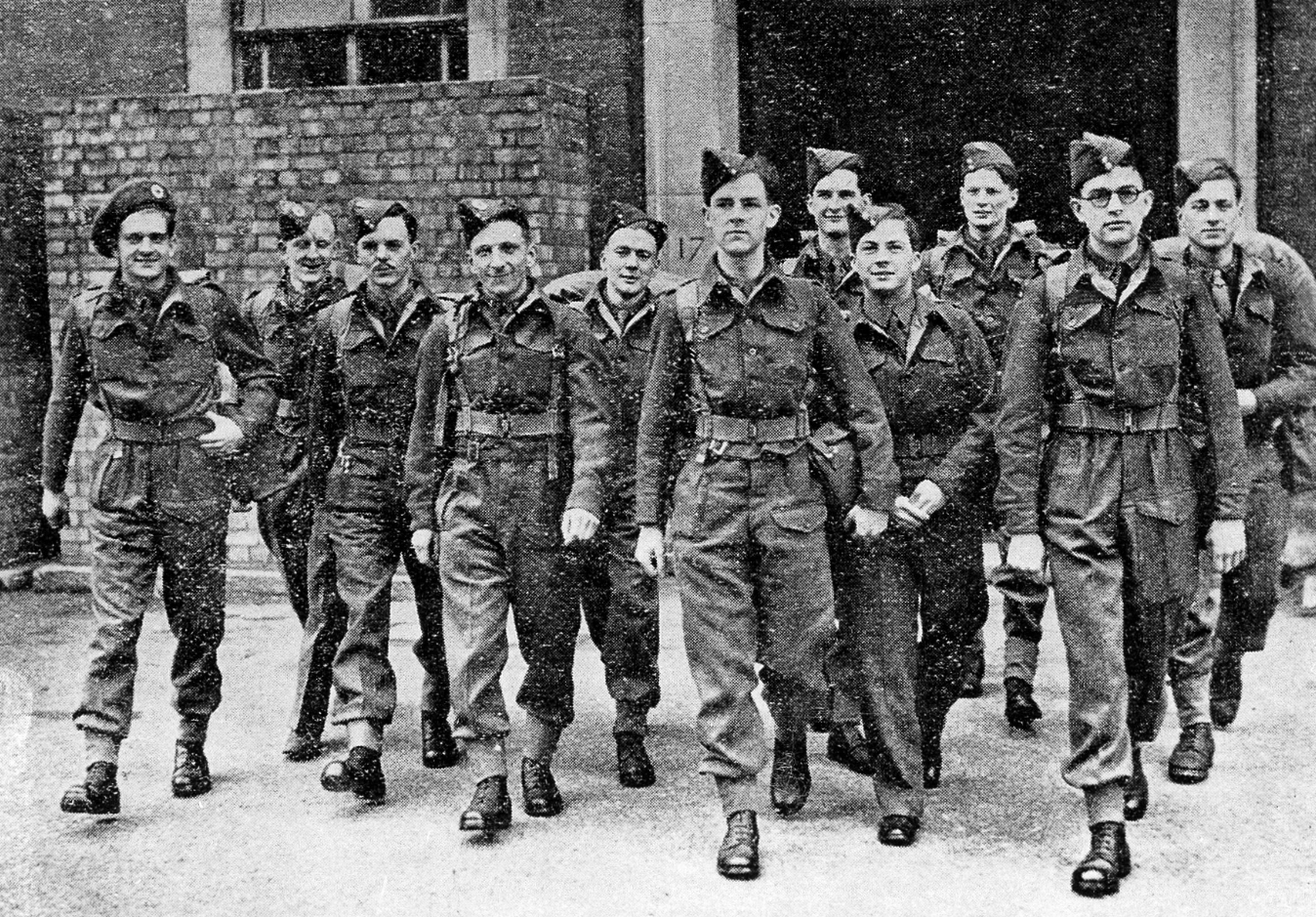
- Michael Hargrave (second from right) and colleagues from Westminster Hospital
- Born: Michael John Hargrave; 8 December 1923; Simla, British India
- Died: 25 July 1974 (aged 50); England
- Education: St Edward's School, Oxford; King's College London; Westminster Hospital
- Occupation: Physician
- Known for: Work at Bergen-Belsen concentration camp in 1945; Bergen-Belsen 1945: A Medical Student's Journal
- Medical career
- Field: General practice
- Institutions: Princess Margaret Hospital, Swindon
- Notable works: Bergen-Belsen 1945: A Medical Student's Journal. Imperial College Press (2014)

Michael John Hargrave (8 December 1923 – 25 July 1974) was a British general practitioner in Wootton Bassett, Wiltshire, who in 1945 assisted British Army occupation forces at the recently liberated Bergen-Belsen concentration camp when he volunteered as a medical student from Westminster Hospital at the age of 21.

After graduating in medicine in 1947, Hargrave took a house job at Westminster Hospital after which he completed his national service with the Royal Air Force in Egypt and Kenya. Upon returning to Wootton Bassett in 1950, he became a general practitioner and a clinical assistant to the ear, nose and throat clinic at the Princess Margaret Hospital, Swindon. By 1956, he had a purpose-built surgery with an appointment system and radiotelephone.

His memoirs, written for his mother, were used by historian Ben Shephard in his 2005 book After Daybreak: The Liberation of Belsen, 1945, and were published by Imperial College Press in 2014, in a book titled Bergen-Belsen 1945: A Medical Student's Journal.

== Early life ==
Michael Hargrave was born on 8 December 1923, in Simla, British India, the elder of two sons of a decorated First World War pilot who was posted there by the Royal Air Force. Hargrave was sent to England to attend Harcourt Preparatory School at Weyhill, following which he attended St Edward's School, Oxford. In 1942, he gained admission to King's College London and then to Westminster Hospital for his clinical education in medicine.

== Belsen ==
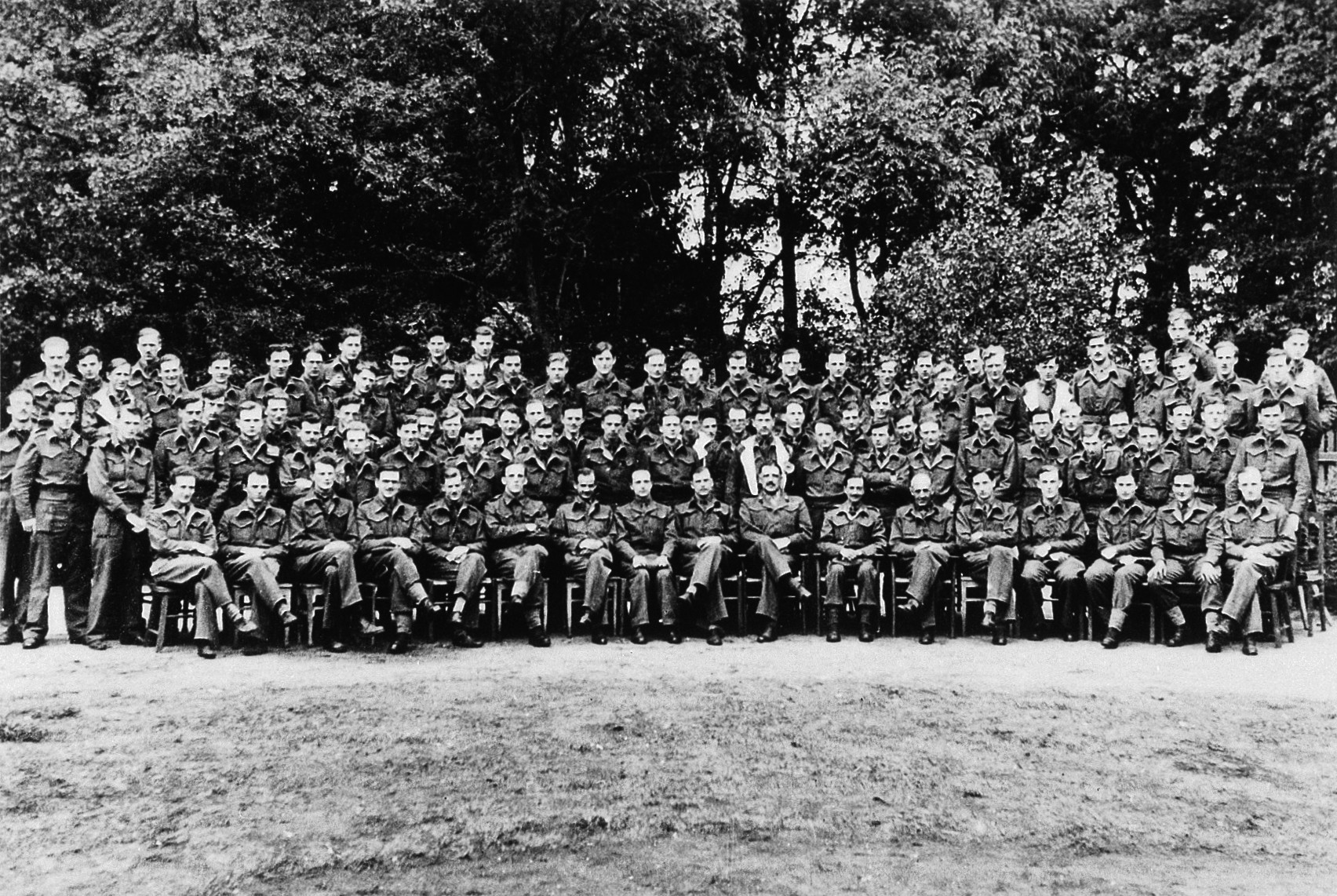
Group photo of London medical students who went to Belsen

Hargrave had, until May 1945, spent the Second World War at school and studying medicine. In April 1945, he was among eleven medical students from Westminster who volunteered to help relieve a famine in Holland, a part of the Netherlands still occupied by the Germans but awaiting liberation. On the day of departure, the students were informed that they were instead being sent to help at the recently liberated Bergen-Belsen concentration camp in Germany.

At Belsen, army medics were trying to prevent the spread of disease and save those they could. Hargrave described in his daily journal the process by which the huts in Camp One were cleaned, disinfected and turned into basic temporary hospitals, after which its inmates were cleaned, disinfected and then moved out. He led this process in hut 210 and performed treatments including the excision of eyelid cysts and tuberculous glands in the neck. He became accustomed to seeing boils, gangrene, diarrhoea, typhus and severe malnutrition. Supervision and briefings were given by nutritionist Arnold Peter Meiklejohn, Brigadier Hugh Glyn-Hughes and Colonel James Johnston. Hargrave also taught a Polish girl, Zosia Wiśniowska, how to speak English.

== Career ==
In 1947, Hargrave graduated in medicine and took up his first house job at Westminster Hospital.

He completed his national service with the Royal Air Force in Egypt and Kenya, returning to Wootton Bassett in 1950 to become a general practitioner. By 1956, he had a purpose-built surgery with an appointment system and radiotelephone. He also helped at the ear, nose and throat clinic at the Princess Margaret Hospital, Swindon. In 1957, he became a member of the Royal College of General Practitioners.

== Family ==
Hargrave married nurse Joy Thompson in 1948, a year after qualifying as a doctor. They had a daughter, Sally, and a son, David. Both developed polio in 1953, two years before the first injectable Salk vaccine. David made a full recovery, but Sally, who was nine months old at the time, was left with a paralysed leg. She became a secretary and David a GP in Portland, Dorset.

== Death and legacy ==
Hargrave was diagnosed with a brain tumour, and died on 25 July 1974.

His papers are held at the Imperial War Museum in London. His memoirs were used by historian Ben Shephard in his 2005 book After Daybreak: The Liberation of Belsen, 1945. The story of the London students was portrayed in the 2007 feature film The Relief of Belsen. His diary, written for his mother, was published by Imperial College Press in 2014, with all royalties donated to Amnesty International and the polio charity Rotary Club PolioPlus.

== Selected publications ==
- "A New Surgery for a Group Practice of Three Doctors". Journal of the College of General Practitioners and Research Newsletter, Vol. 1, Issue 4 (1958), pp. 356–359. (With J. N. Watson and R. D. C. Hart)
- "The Radiotelephone". Journal of the College of General Practitioners, (1961) Vol. 4, p. 446. (With R. D. C. Hart and P. S. Mitchell)
- "Acute otitis media; A survey of 400 cases". Journal of the Royal College of General Practitioners, Vol. 16, Issue 1 (1968), pp. 78–80.
