= Bergen-Belsen 1945: A Medical Student's Journal =

Memoirs

- Author: Michael John Hargrave
- Genre: Diary
- Publisher: Imperial College Press
- Publication date: 2014
- Publication place: United Kingdom
- Pages: 92
- ISBN: 978-1-78326-320-2

Bergen-Belsen 1945: A Medical Student's Journal is Michael Hargrave's diary of his experiences providing medical assistance to the former inmates of Bergen-Belsen concentration camp between 28 April and 28 May 1945. It was written for his mother after he volunteered for the work while he was a student at Westminster Hospital Medical School in London. It is a typescript of the diary, which was originally hand-written, and begins with a foreword by the head of research at the Imperial War Museum and brief background notes by Hargrave's son David. Centre pages include photographs of the London medical students and the state of the camp, including the "human laundry".

The book was launched by Amnesty International UK in 2013 with a speech by Mala Tribich, a survivor of Bergen-Belsen who described her experiences in the camp. Also present were historian Ben Shephard and philosopher Jonathan Wolff. It was published in 2014 by Imperial College Press, with the sale profits going to Amnesty International and the Rotary Foundation's PolioPlus campaign.

== Publication ==
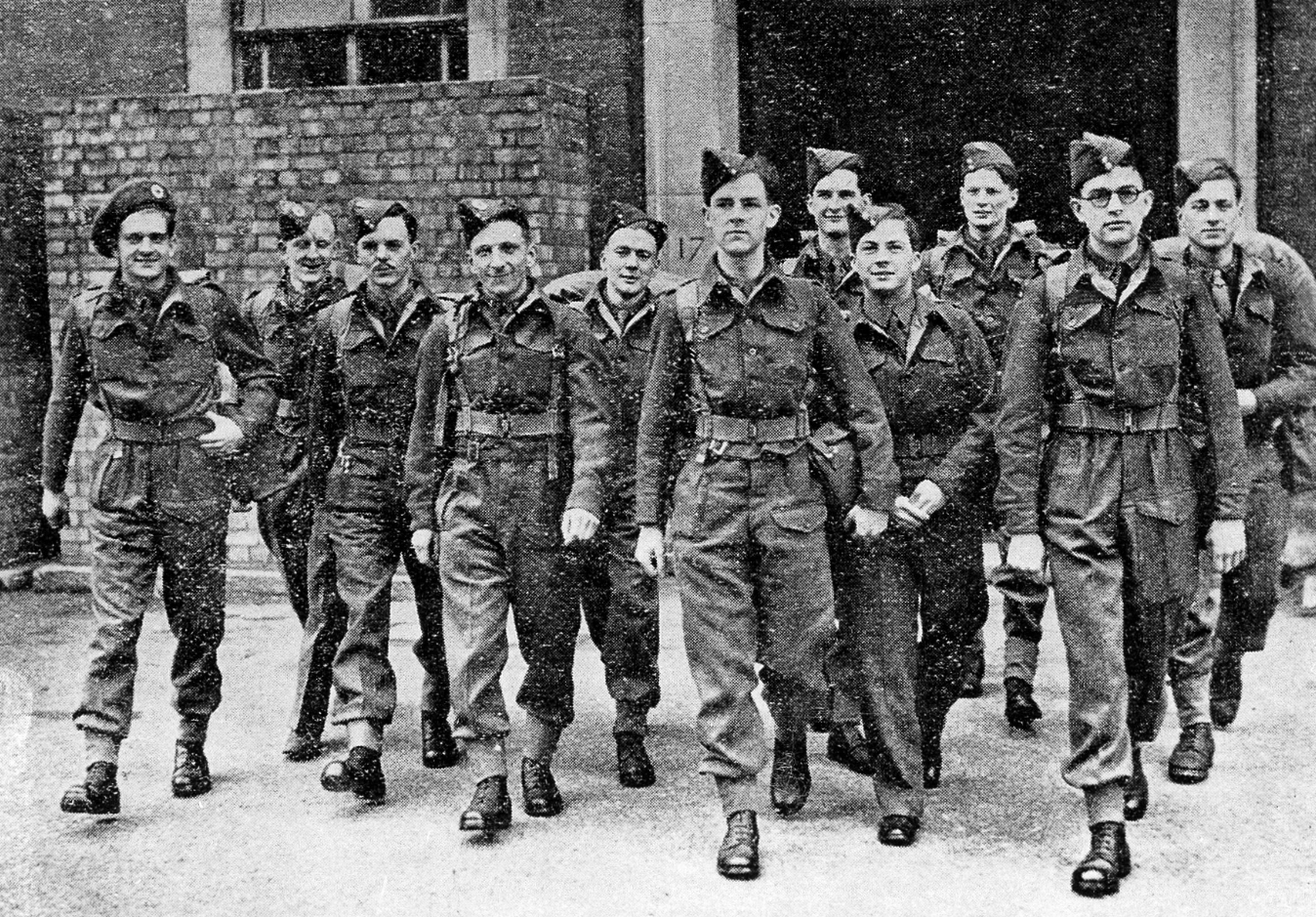
Michael Hargrave (second from right) and colleagues from Westminster Hospital

The book was published in 2014 by Imperial College Press as a 97-page facsimile of the typescript of Hargrave's original handwritten memoir of 1945. He had donated the journal to the Imperial War Museum in 1968.

== Layout ==
The book begins with a dedication "to all those who suffered in the Holocaust", followed by a foreword by Suzanne Bardgen, head of research of the Imperial War Museum, and a short acknowledgement by Amnesty International UK and the Rotary Foundation's PolioPlus campaign. It then has a brief biography of Michael Hargrave and historical context of the diseases found at the Bergen-Belsen concentration camp written by his son, the physician David B. Hargrave. David explains that by the time the students arrived at the camp, the British had already buried 10,000 inmates, leaving the task of managing those that had survived. His father, then age 21, was allocated to a hut, primarily to "sort the living from the dead and try to stop people dying ... He looked after mainly young women with typhus, diarrhoea, malnutrition.”

The bulk of the book is Hargrave's journal, written while he was at the Bergen-Belsen concentration camp as a volunteer medical student from Westminster Hospital Medical School, London. It was written for his mother to read, should he not survive the war, and dates from 28 April 1945, when he meets the British Red Cross and departs from an airfield near Cirencester, to 28 May 1945, when he arrives back to London and lands at Croydon Airport. There are 16 pages of contemporary photographs and newspaper cuttings, as well as a glossary, but no index.

== The journal ==
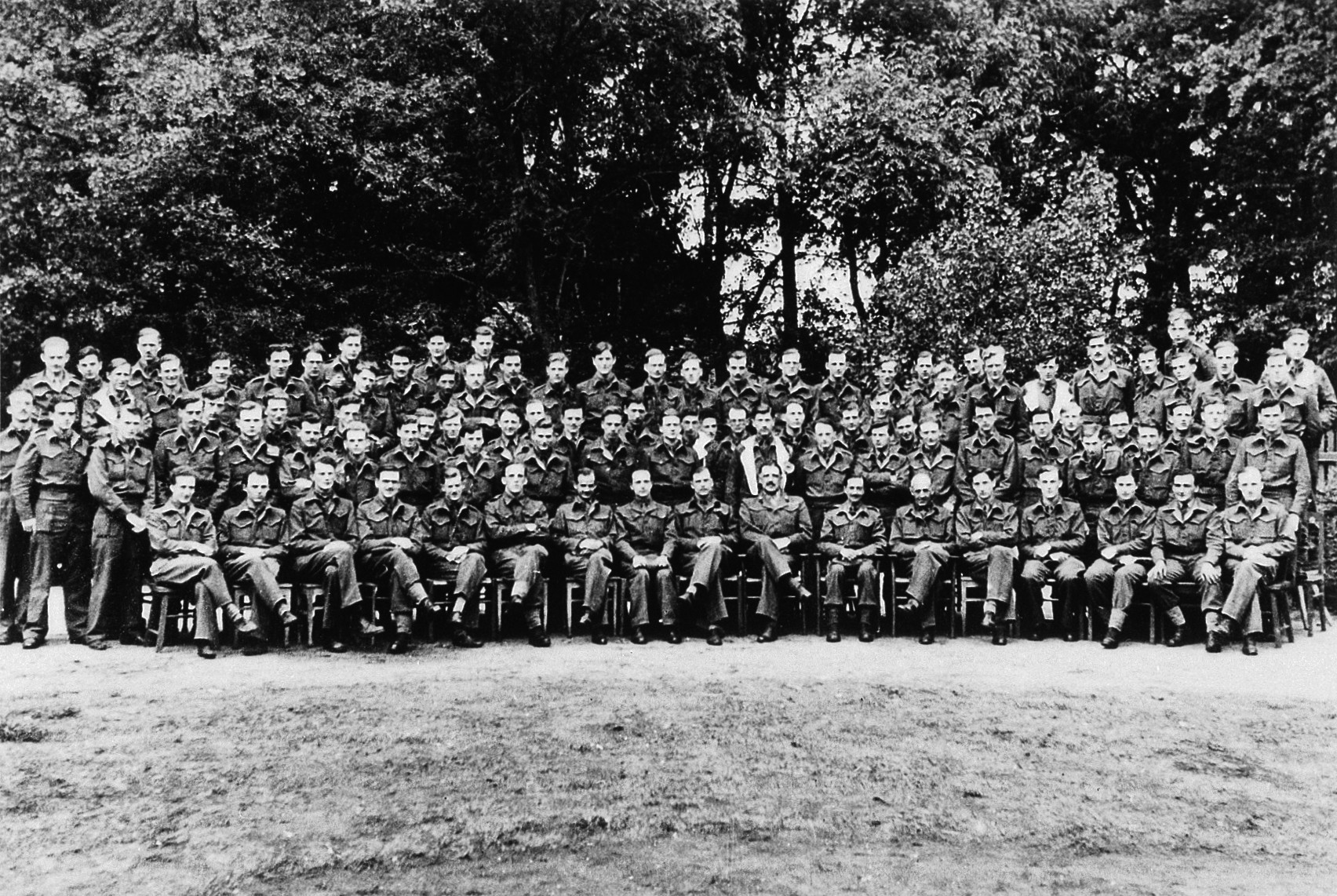
London medical students who went to Bergen-Belsen

=== Journey ===
Hargrave's journal begins on 28 April 1945 when, in battledress, he travelled with the other students from Westminster Hospital medical school to meet the British Red Cross, have some official photographs taken, and receive his documents. Although he was to initially to fly to Holland, Belsen in Germany had recently been liberated by British troops and a request for extra help was made upon realising the extent of the problems there. The students were subsequently informed that they would be re-directed to Belsen.

Hargrave wrote that same day, "This was the first news we had been given about going to Belsen, but we were all so excited about going, after a month of waiting, that we did not think much about the change in destination". Following several attempts to reach Celle due to bad weather and involving one failed attempt resulting in a landing at Croydon Airport, his flight in one of six Dakotas from Cirencester reached Celle on 2 May 1945.

=== Arrival at Belsen ===
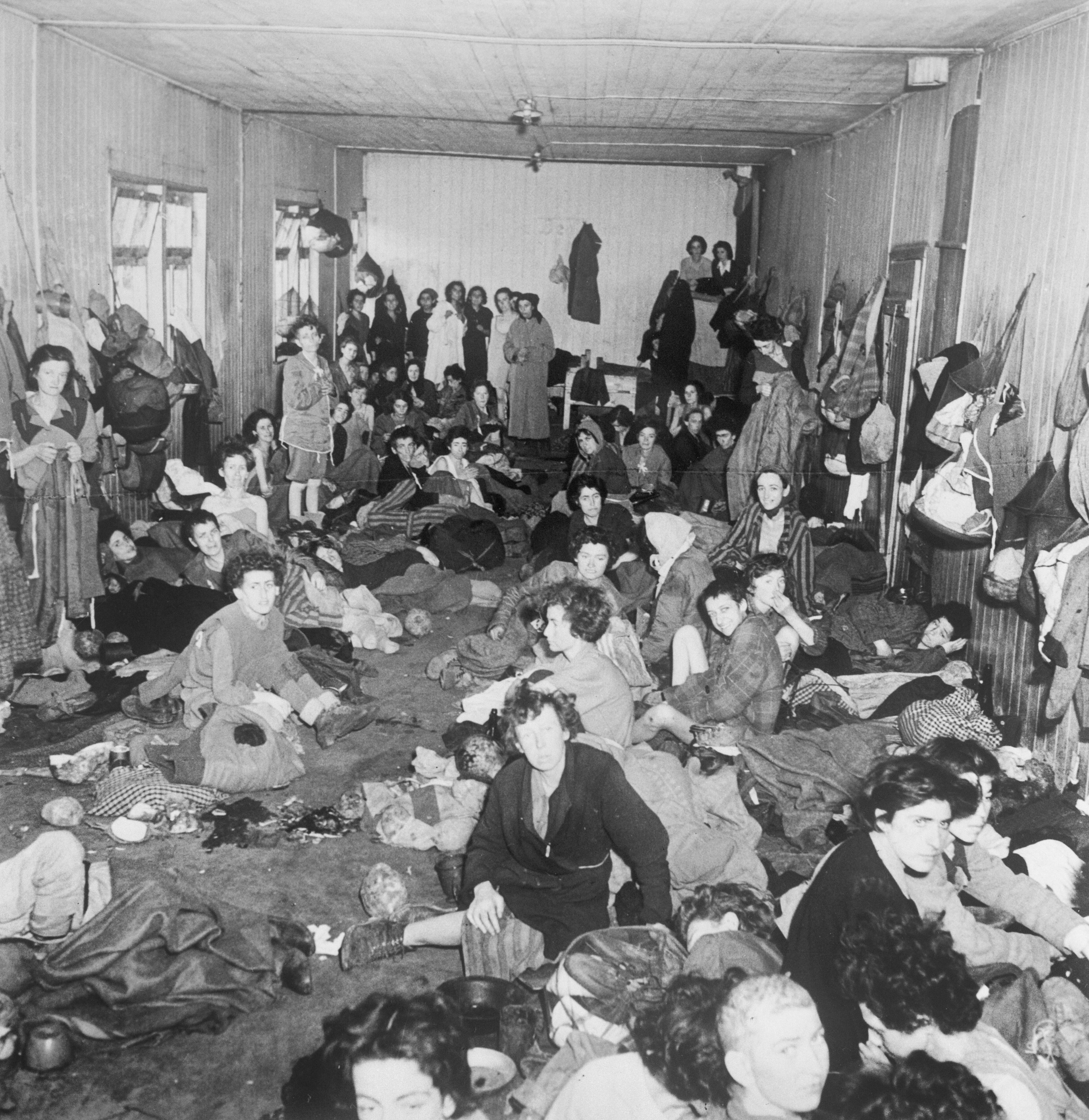
Women in hut at Bergen-Belsen

Of his first encounter with the camp, Hargrave wrote:

We found Hut 224. We went into the hut and were almost knocked back by the smell. The sight that met us was shocking. There were no beds whatsoever and in this one room there were about 200 women, from 15 to 30 years old, lying on the floor. In some cases they wore few rags and in some cases they wore no clothes at all. The floor was covered in faeces and soaked in urine. They all had extremely severe diarrhoea and were too weak to move.

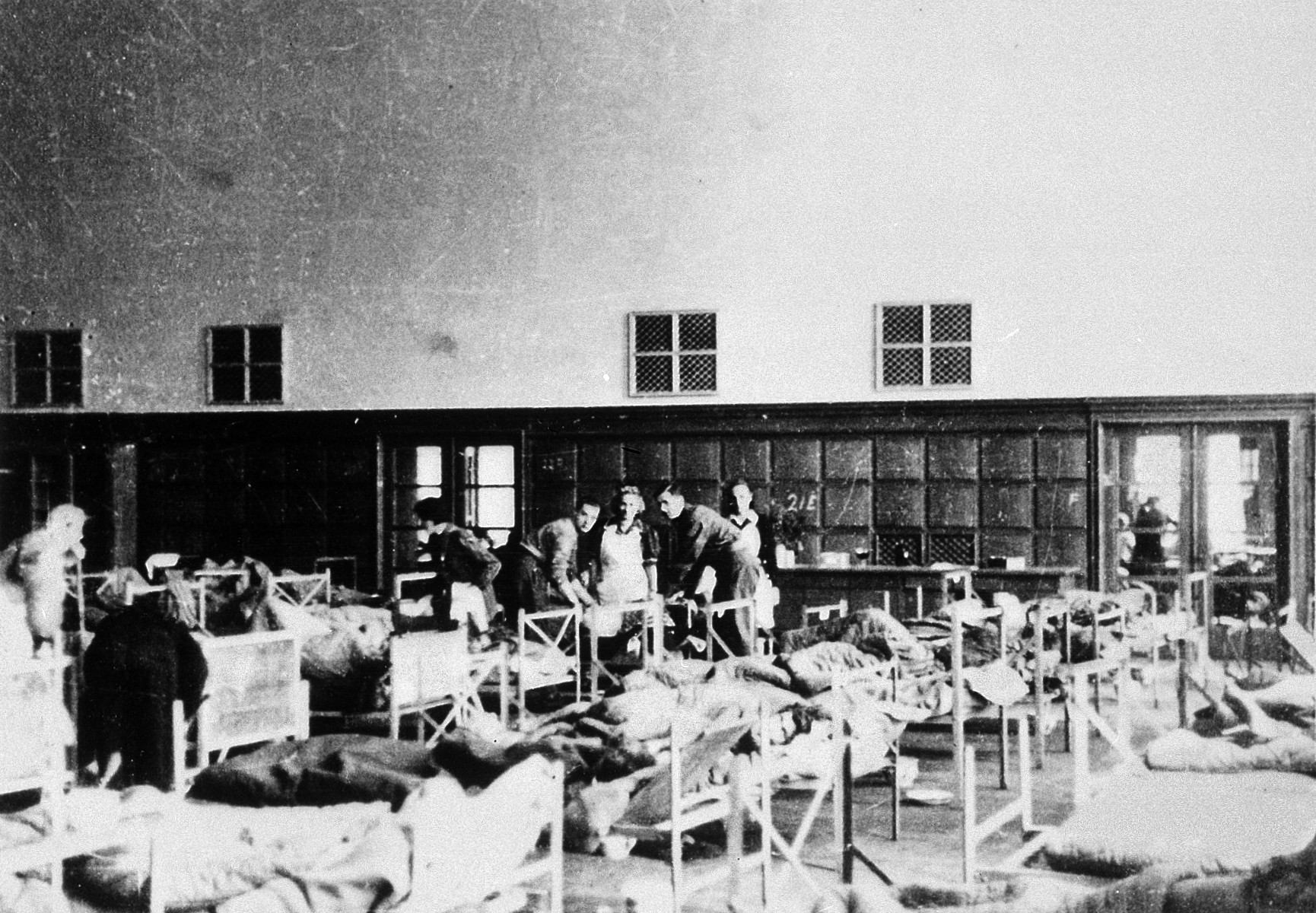
Medical students at Belsen in converted hospital ward

He was allocated hut 217, which contained only women, and described how on his first day he could not do much more than offer the 240 inmates a restricted supply of food that included an "ovaltine/horlicks/cocoa mixture, two cups of glucose solution, one square of chocolate, and one biscuit.

=== Treatments ===
He described performing simple operative procedures;

Opened a breast abscess with a razor blade heated in a flame and then cooled in alcohol. Made quick 2″ incision and then back with Marine gauze – no anaesthetic and patient must have been in great agony – did not yell. Opened boil on forearm in similar way.

=== The "human laundry" ===
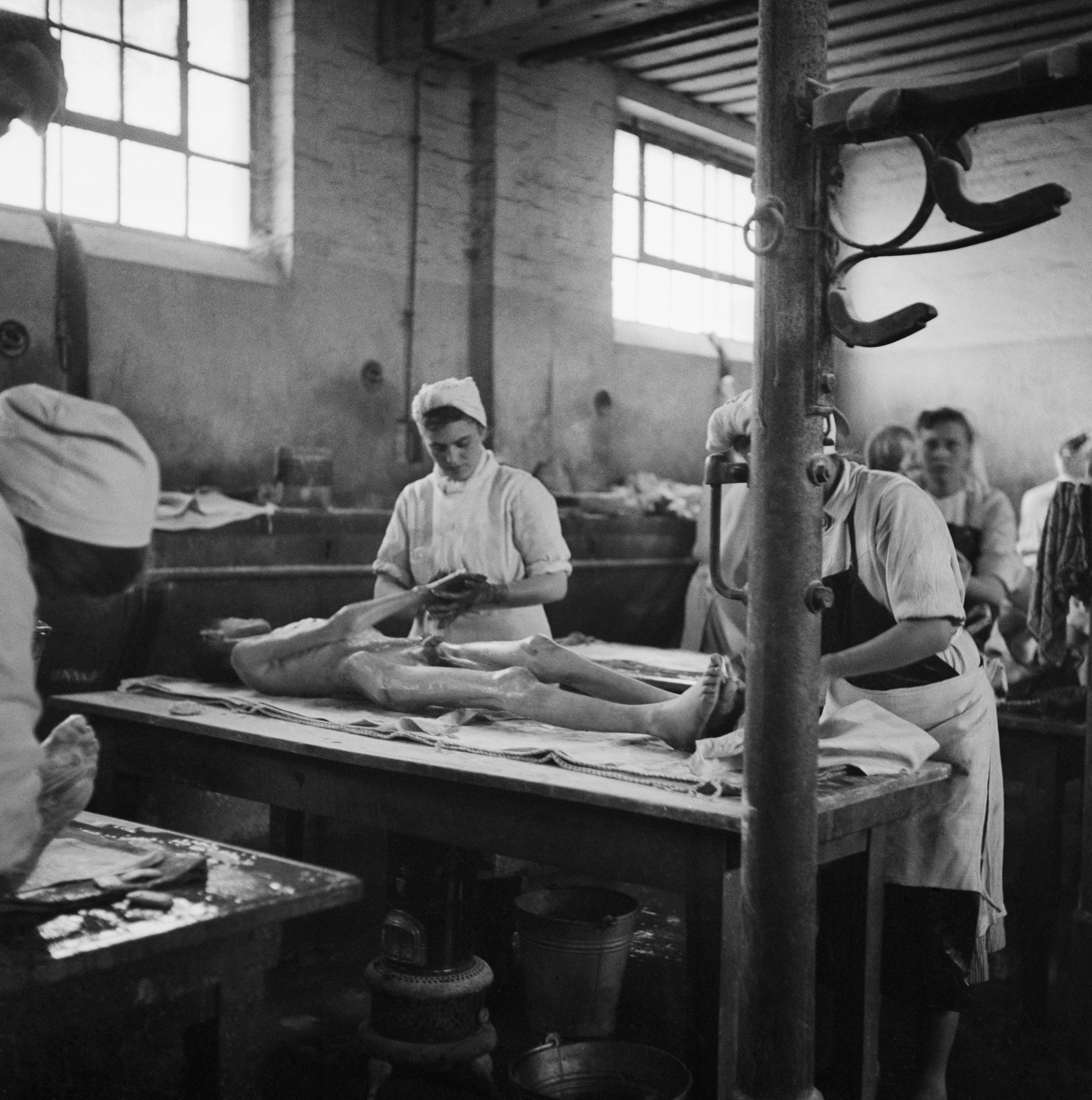
The "human laundry", May 1945.

The journal contains a number of diagrams drawn by Hargrave, including one of the "human laundry", which was constructed in two stables of Camp II. Inmates chosen by the students were sent there from Camp I with the 11th Field Ambulance, to be cleaned and deloused by groups of German nurses who were dispersed around 17 tables. Four nurses attended to each inmate at one time. After they were washed with soap and water, their hair was cut, and they were sprayed with the pesticide DDT. They were then wrapped in fresh blankets and transferred to the hospital in Camp II in a clean ambulance. Those that were deemed fit could go to Camp III or IV where they could be repatriated. Hargrave recorded that several of these nurses contracted typhus.

=== Last few days ===
On his final full day in Germany, while he was out in the German countryside with nutritionist Arnold Meiklejohn and a few other students, Hargrave noted that "all the German women and children were fair haired and ... a dark head was the exception." By contrast, at Belsen he did not see any blonde-haired people during the whole time he was there. As the students approached the end of their time at Belsen, they handed over operations to Belgian medical students.

== Reception ==
The book was launched by Amnesty International UK in 2013 with a speech by a Belsen survivor, Mala Tribich, who described her experiences in the camp. Also present were historian Ben Shephard and the philosopher Jonathan Wolff.

It was reviewed by Dianne Timblin in American Scientist who described Hargrave as "an alert chronicler and a talented writer".

== See also ==
- List of London medical students who assisted at Belsen
