= Bruno Brodniewicz =

German prisoner in the Auschwitz concentration camp

- Born: Boleslaus Brodniewicz; 22 July 1895; Poznań, Province of Posen, Kingdom of Prussia (now Poland)
- Died: 30 October 1962 (aged 67); Bremen, Germany
- Other names: Black Death; Czarna śmierć
- Occupation: Criminal
- Known for: Being the first Lagerälteste (camp elder) at the Auschwitz concentration camp

Bruno Brodniewicz (born 22 July 1895 in Posen, died 30 October 1962 in Bremen) was the first Lagerälteste (camp elder) at the Auschwitz concentration camp, carrying prisoner tag number 1.

== Life ==
As a convicted criminal, Brodniewicz was transferred to a concentration camp during the late summer of 1934. He was held temporarily in the Lichtenburg concentration camp. Brodniewicz was one of the first 30 prisoners, defined as the so-called 'professional criminals', who, on 20 May 1940 accompanied by the roll call officer Gerhard Palitzsch from the Sachsenhausen concentration camp were taken to the newly established concentration camp at Auschwitz.

Brodniewicz was the first camp elder of the main camp of Auschwitz and remained in this position until 1942. He wore prisoner tag number 1 and was considered "Black Death" (Czarna śmierć) in the camp. As one of the "Greens" (so-called because their uniforms bore the green triangle identifying them as criminal prisoners), Brodniewicz was considered relentlessly brutal and is believed to have been responsible for the deaths of many fellow inmates. He decisively influenced the camp atmosphere in what was to become a reign of terror. Brodniewicz had illegally hidden gold and other valuables in his parlour, which the SS found after fellow inmate Otto Küsel (inmate No. 2) tipped them off. Brodniewicz was then sent to the punishment bunker in late December 1942 or early January 1943 and was replaced as the camp elder.

Brodniewicz then became camp elder in the Roma camp at Auschwitz, in June 1943 in the Jaworzno concentration camp, a sub-camp of Auschwitz. From April 1944 he was held in the satellite camp Eintrachthütte, then from September 1944 in the satellite camp Bismarckhütte. After Auschwitz was evacuated in January 1945, Brodniewicz was transferred to the Woffleben subcamp, where he also held the position of camp elder. He was last held in the Bergen-Belsen concentration camp. According to former prisoners, Brodniewicz was lynched after the liberation. In reality, after the war he settled in Bremen, where he died in 1962.

== Literature ==
- Andrzej Domagała: Należał do przeciętnie złych... Śladem pierwszych trzydziestu więźniów funkcyjnych z KL Auschwitz. Państwowe Muzeum Auschwitz-Birkenau, Oświęcim 2024
- Hermann Langbein: People in Auschwitz. Univ. of North Carolina Press, 26 April 2004
- Hermann Langbein: People in Auschwitz. Frankfurt am Main 1980
- Reni Rieger: Emil Bednarek - prisoner in Auschwitz. Grin Verlag 2008
- Wolfgang Benz, Barbara Distel (ed.): The place of terror. History of the Nazi concentration camps. Volume 5: Hinzert, Auschwitz, Neuengamme. CH Beck, Munich 2007, ISBN 978-3-406-52965-8.
- Till Bastian: Auschwitz and the 'Auschwitz Lie' mass murder and falsification of history. CH Beck 1997, ISBN 3-406-43155-0
