= After Daybreak =

- Author: Ben Shephard
- Language: English
- Subject: Bergen-Belsen concentration camp
- Publisher: Jonathan Cape
- Publication date: 2005
- Publication place: United Kingdom
- ISBN: 978-0-224-07355-4
- Dewey Decimal: 940.531853595
- LC Class: D805.5.B47 S54

After Daybreak: The Liberation of Belsen, 1945, is a book authored by Ben Shephard, published in 2005 by Jonathan Cape and Random House, in which he details the liberation of Belsen by British troops in April 1945.
