= The Lüneburg Variation =

1997 novel by Paolo Maurensig

- Author: Paolo Maurensig
- Language: English
- Genre: Novel
- Publisher: Farrar, Straus and Giroux
- Publication date: December 17, 1997
- Publication place: United States
- Media type: Print (hardcover)
- Pages: 140
- ISBN: 0-374-19435-1 (hardcover)
- LC Class: PQ4873.A8947V3713 1997

The Lüneburg Variation is a novel by Paolo Maurensig, published in Italian in 1993 by Adelphi edizioni s.p.a. Milan and published in English translation in 1997. It is the author's first novel, published after he turned fifty. The New York Times Book Review describes it as “a story of evil and revenge centering on the game of chess—chess invested with an elevated and yet also sinister, cabalistic quality. It is an absorbing story, lushly draped in Middle European tragedy, one blending the themes of obsession, history and character.”

== Background ==
The story centers around the mysterious death of sixty-eight-year-old Dr. Dieter Frisch, a wealthy industrialist and chess master, living outside Vienna. Having returned from his office in Munich on Friday evening, he was discovered on Sunday morning in the orchard of his estate, at the center of a concentric maze, built in the shape of a chess board. Dr Frisch was found lying in a pool of his own blood, with his antique silver pistol several feet from the body. There was no suicide note, but a primitive chess set was found by police, in Dr Frisch's study, set up at a complicated middle-game position.

== Structure ==
=== The Lüneburg Variation ===
The narrator's role is now assumed by a young man, Hans Meyer, a student at the Academy of Fine Arts Vienna, who states that the death was not a suicide, accident or crime, but that, “Frisch’s death was an execution, albeit deferred in space and time.”, and he is the executioner. Hans narrates that he first met Frisch on the Munich-Vienna express train, although he had been seeking him for some time. Dr Frisch was returning from his Munich office to Vienna and was engaged, as was his habit, in a chess game with his regular travel companion, Baum. Frisch just lost his game against Baum, employing the speculative ‘Lüneburg Variation’. At this point the young man, Hans spoke up, “It doesn’t seem to me that you made the best possible moves.” Frisch was used to comments from incompetents and asked the young man to clarify. Hans responded, “Really. This variation has to be played as dynamically as possible, not reduced to the defensive immobility you imposed. The aim is to queen a pawn--that’s the essential threat. Without some compensation for the initial Knight sacrifice, you face a losing endgame, that’s obvious.” With this pronouncement, the young man had shown that he was a supremely talented chess player and had set the bait resulting in Frisch's death.

=== The Student ===
Hans Meyer was a student of the enigmatic chess genius Tabori. Tabori trained Hans in a tiny room, containing little more than an antique metal chess set. This chess set was inscribed on the sides with Hebrew lettering and had the mystical power of punishing blunders immediately, with an electric shock. Hans’ training and torment continued for a full year, such that, at the end of this period he attained a Zen like calm. He felt omnipotent and invincible and noted, “Once I attained that state there was not the remotest chance I’d make a mistake.” For the next year, Hans and Tabori travelled throughout Europe, with Hans playing in elite chess tournaments.

=== The Teacher ===
Tabori, on his death bed, tells his life story to Hans, such that the first-person narration now switches from Hans to Tabori. Tabori tells Hans of his obsession with chess from a young age. He also tells Hans about his nemesis, an anti-Semitic German youth, about three years older than Tabori. This boy is also a first-class chess player, but he covets Tabori's superior talent and hates him because he is Jewish. Tabori sees his nemesis at virtually every chess tournament. The German is dressed initially in the uniform of the Hitler Youth and in the final tournament in Vienna 1938, in which Tabori is allowed to compete, his nemesis is wearing a new Nazi SS uniform. Although Tabori and the German tie for first in the tournament, Tabori (born ‘Rubinstein’) is disqualified by anti-Semitic tournament organizers on a technicality, making his nemesis the sole winner.

=== Bergen-Belsen ===
Increasing anti-Semitism leading up to WWII leads to severe hardships for Tabori, resulting, ultimately, in his incarceration in the Bergen-Belsen concentration camp, where his nemesis is the commandant. Rubinstein (Tabori) is reduced to near death by the rigors of forced labor and the tortures following a failed escape attempt. Finally, he is compelled to play an extended chess match with his nemesis, for the highest stakes possible.

== Critical impact ==
Kirkus reviews calls The Lüneburg Variation "A polished and subtle first novel, published in Italy in 1993, that details with Nabokovian cunning the working-out of a 'sickening design'." A shortcoming of the book is according to Kirkus is that "We never return to Hans Mayer or to the actual events of Dieter Frisch's death, but are instead left to infer the crucial climactic details of a novel whose serpentine 'variations' leave the reader simultaneously enthralled and frustrated—in effect, stalemated."

Publishers Weekly opined, “Not since White Knights of Reykjavik, George Steiner's riveting account of the 1972 world championship match between Boris Spassky and Bobby Fischer, has a writer demonstrated such stunning insight into the nurturing madness that compels chess play at the master level.”

== Adaptations ==
In July 2025 it was reported that Italian director Gabriele Salvatores was attached making a movie of the book.
