= Bergen-Belsen concentration camp =

Nazi concentration camp in Germany (1940–1945)

Bergen-Belsen
- Nazi concentration camp
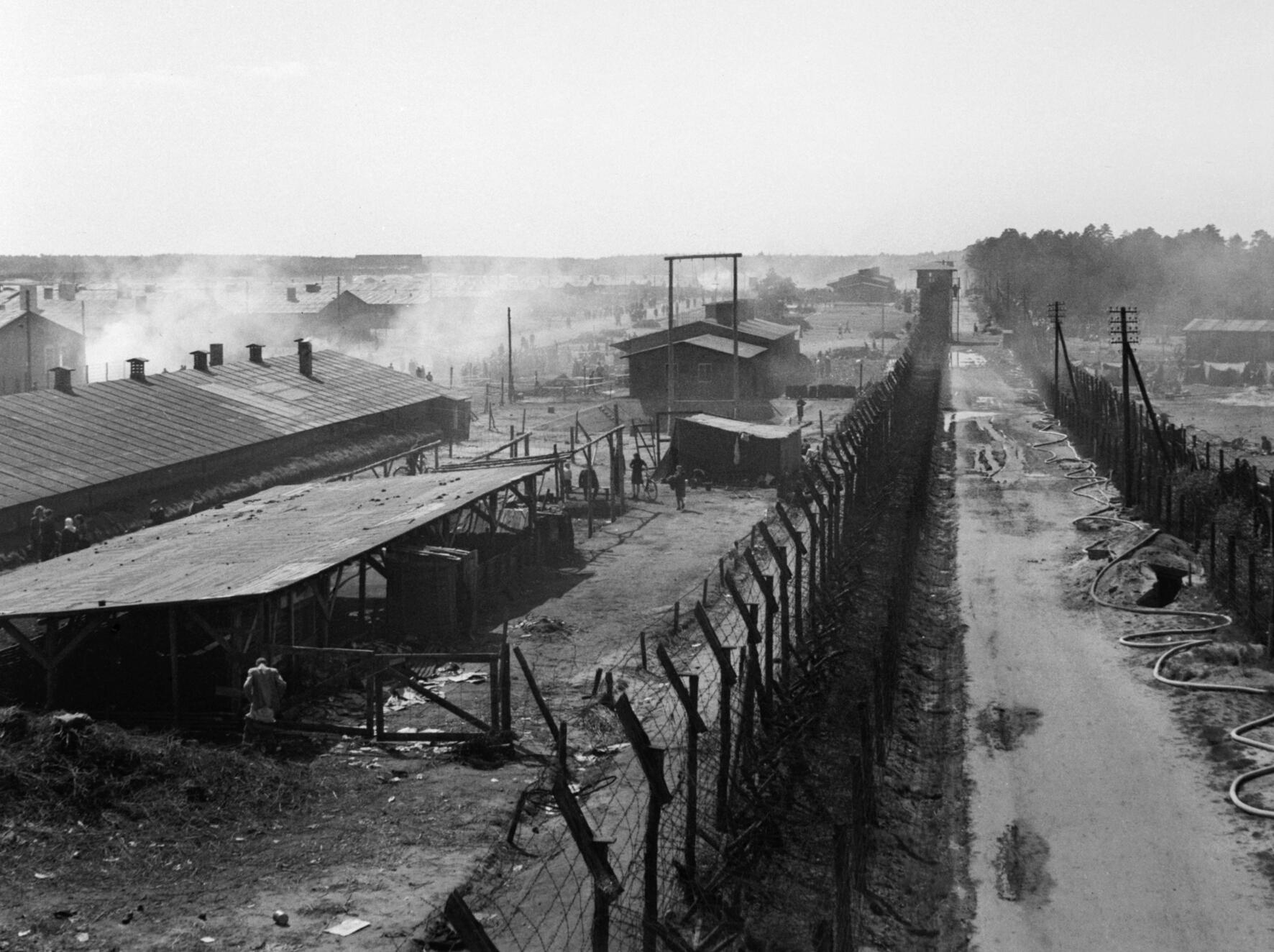
- View of the camp after liberation

- Location within Germany
- Coordinates: 52°45′28″N 9°54′28″E
- Location: Lower Saxony, Northern Germany
- Operated by: SS-Totenkopfverbände
- Commandant: List: Adolf Haas (April 1943 – December 2, 1944); Josef Kramer (December 2, 1944 – April 15, 1945)
- Original use: Prisoner-of-war camp
- Operational: 1940–1945
- Inmates: Jews, Poles, Soviets, Dutch, Czechs, Germans, Austrians
- Number of inmates: 120,000
- Killed: 70,000 or more
- Liberated by: United Kingdom and Canada, April 15, 1945
- Notable inmates: Anne and Margot Frank
- Website: bergen-belsen.stiftung-ng.de/en/

Bergen-Belsen (pronounced [ˈbɛʁɡn̩ˌbɛlsn̩]), or Belsen, was a Nazi concentration camp in what is today Lower Saxony in northern Germany, southwest of the town of Bergen near Celle. Originally established as a prisoner of war camp, in 1943, parts of it became a concentration camp. Initially this was an "exchange camp", where Jewish hostages were held with the intention of exchanging them for German prisoners of war held overseas. The camp was later expanded to hold Jews from other concentration camps, as a part of the Holocaust.

After 1945, the name was applied to the displaced persons camp established nearby, but it is most commonly associated with the concentration camp. From 1941 to 1945, almost 20,000 Soviet prisoners of war and a further 50,000 inmates died there. Overcrowding, lack of food, and poor sanitary conditions caused outbreaks of typhus, tuberculosis, typhoid fever, and dysentery, leading to the deaths of more than 35,000 people in the first few months of 1945, shortly before and after the liberation.

The camp was liberated on April 15, 1945, by the British 11th Armoured Division. The soldiers discovered approximately 60,000 prisoners inside, most of them half-starved and seriously ill, and another 13,000 corpses lying around the camp unburied. A memorial with an exhibition hall currently stands at the site.

== Operation ==
=== Prisoner of war camp ===
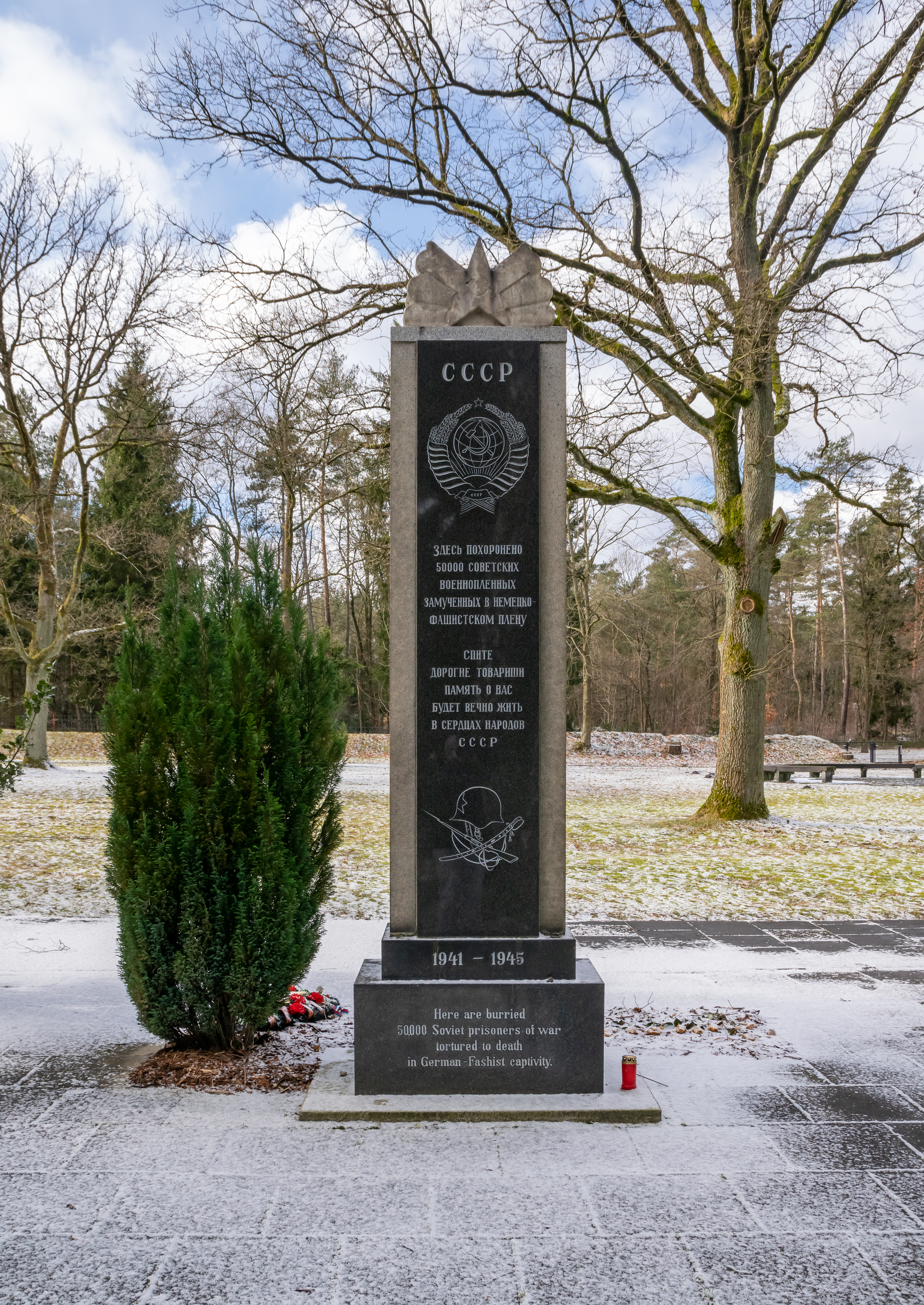
Memorial to Soviet prisoners of war

In 1935, the Wehrmacht began to build a large military complex close to the village of Belsen, a part of the town of Bergen, in what was then the Province of Hanover. This became the largest military training area in Germany at the time and was used for armoured vehicle training. The barracks were finished in 1937. The camp has been in continuous operation since then and is today known as Bergen-Hohne Training Area. It is used by NATO armed forces.

The workers who constructed the original buildings were housed in camps near Fallingbostel and Bergen, the latter being the so-called Bergen-Belsen Army Construction Camp. Once the military complex was completed in 1938–39, the workers' camp fell into disuse. However, after the German invasion of Poland in September 1939, the Wehrmacht began using the huts as a prisoner of war (POW) camp.

The camp of huts near Fallingbostel became known as Stalag XI-B and would become one of the Wehrmacht's largest POW camps, holding up to 95,000 prisoners from various countries. In June 1940, Belgian and French POWs were housed in the former Bergen-Belsen construction workers' camp. This installation was significantly expanded from June 1941, once Germany prepared to invade the Soviet Union, becoming an independent camp known as Stalag XI-C (311). It was intended to hold up to 20,000 Soviet POWs and was one of three such camps in the area. The others were at Oerbke (Stalag XI-D (321)) and Wietzendorf (Stalag X-D (310)). By the end of March 1942, some 41,000 Soviet POWs had died in these three camps from starvation, exhaustion, and disease. By the end of the war, the total number of dead had increased to 50,000. When the POW camp in Bergen ceased operation in early 1945, as the Wehrmacht handed it over to the SS, the cemetery contained over 19,500 dead Soviet prisoners.

In the summer of 1943, Stalag XI-C (311) was dissolved and Bergen-Belsen became a branch camp of Stalag XI-B. It served as the hospital for all Soviet POWs in the region until January 1945. Other inmates/patients were Italian military internees from August 1944 and, following the suppression of the Warsaw Uprising in October 1944, around 1,000 members of the Polish Home Army were imprisoned in a separate section of the POW camp.

=== Concentration camp ===
In April 1943, a part of the Bergen-Belsen camp was taken over by the SS Economic-Administration Main Office (SS Wirtschafts-Verwaltungshauptamt; WVHA). It thus became part of the concentration camp system, run by the SS Schutzstaffel, but it was a special case. Having initially been designated a Zivilinterniertenlager ("civilian internment camp"), in June 1943 it was redesignated Aufenthaltslager ("holding camp"), since the Geneva Conventions stipulated that the former type of facility must be open to inspection by international committees. This "holding camp" or "exchange camp" was for Jews who were intended to be exchanged for German civilians interned in other countries, or for hard currency. The SS divided this camp into subsections for individual groups (the "Hungarian camp", the "special camp" for Polish Jews, the "neutrals camp" for citizens of neutral countries and the "Star camp" for Dutch Jews). Between the summer of 1943 and December 1944 at least 14,600 Jews, including 2,750 minors, were transported to the Bergen-Belsen "holding" or exchange camp. Inmates were made to work, many of them in the "shoe commando" which salvaged usable pieces of leather from shoes collected and brought to the camp from all over Germany and occupied Europe. In general, the prisoners of this part of the camp were treated less harshly than some other classes of Bergen-Belsen prisoner until fairly late in the war, due to their perceived potential exchange value. However, only around 2,560 Jewish prisoners were ever actually released from Bergen-Belsen and allowed to leave Germany.

In March 1944, part of the camp was redesignated as an Erholungslager ("recovery camp"), where prisoners too sick to work were brought from other concentration camps. They were in Belsen supposedly to recover and then return to their original camps and resume work, but many of them died in Belsen of disease, starvation, exhaustion and lack of medical attention.

In August 1944, a new section was created, and this became the so-called "women's camp". By November 1944 this camp received around 9,000 women and young girls. Most of those who were able to work stayed only for a short while and were then sent on to other concentration camps or slave-labour camps. The first women interned there were Poles, arrested after the failed Warsaw Uprising. Others were Jewish women from Poland or Hungary, transferred from Auschwitz. Margot and Anne Frank died there in February or March 1945.

=== More prisoners ===
In December 1944, SS-Hauptsturmführer Josef Kramer, previously at Auschwitz-Birkenau, became the new camp commandant, replacing SS-Hauptsturmführer Adolf Haas, who had been in post since the spring of 1943. In January 1945, the SS took over the POW hospital and increased the size of Bergen-Belsen. As eastern concentration camps were evacuated before the advance of the Red Army, at least 85,000 people were transported in cattle cars or marched to Bergen-Belsen. Before that, the number of prisoners at Belsen had been much smaller. In July 1944, there were 7,300; by December 1944, the number had increased to 15,000; and by February 1945, it had risen to 22,000. Numbers then soared to around 60,000 by April 15, 1945. This overcrowding led to a vast increase in deaths from disease: particularly typhus, as well as tuberculosis, typhoid fever, dysentery and malnutrition in a camp originally designed to hold about 10,000 inmates. At this point also, the special status of the exchange prisoners no longer applied. All inmates were subject to starvation and epidemics.

=== Außenlager (satellite camps) ===
Bergen-Belsen concentration camp had three satellite camps. These were at regional armament works. Around 2,000 female concentration camp prisoners were forced to work there. Those who were too weak or sick to continue with their work were brought to Bergen-Belsen.

Außenlager Bomlitz-Benefeld at Bomlitz near Fallingbostel was in use from September 3 to October 15, 1944. It was located at the facility of Eibia GmbH, a gunpowder works. Around 600 female Polish Jews were used for construction and production work.

Außenlager Hambühren-Ovelgönne (Lager III, Waldeslust) at Hambühren south of Winsen was in use from August 23, 1944, to February 4, 1945. It was an abandoned potash mine, now intended as an underground production site for Bremen plane manufacturer Focke-Wulf. Around 400 prisoners, mostly female Polish or Hungarian Jews, were forced to prepare the facility and to help lay train tracks to it. This was done for the company Hochtief.

Außenlager Unterlüß-Altensothrieth (Tannenberglager) east of Bergen was in use from late August 1944 to April 13, 1945. It was located at Unterlüß, where the Rheinmetall-Borsig AG had a large test site. Up to 900 female Polish, Hungarian, Romanian, Yugoslavian and Czech Jews had to clear forest, do construction work or work in munitions production.

Prisoners were guarded by SS staff and received no wages for their work. The companies instead reimbursed the SS for the labour supplied. Wage taxes were also levied by local authorities.

=== Treatment of prisoners and deaths in the camp ===
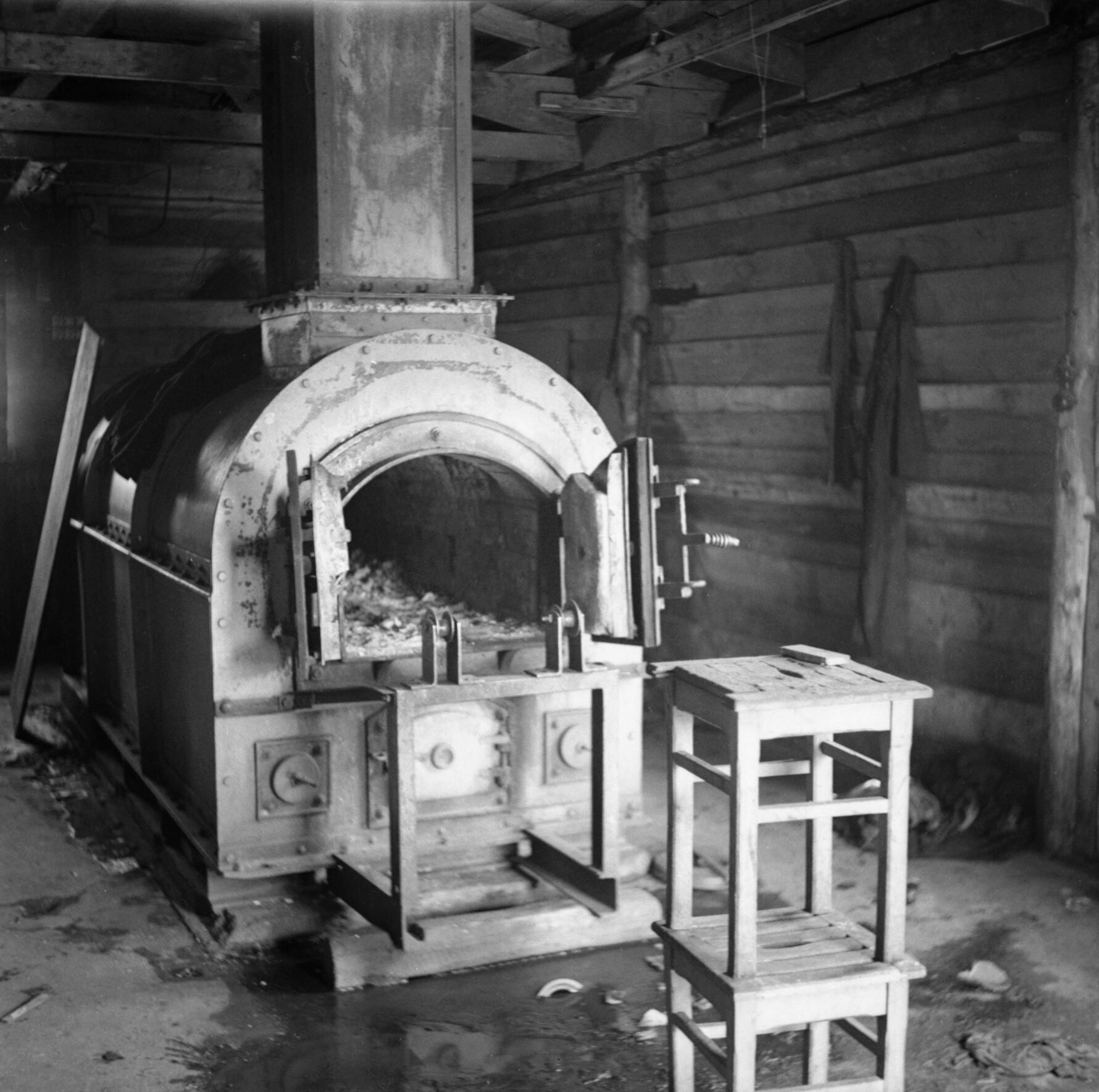
Bergen Belsen crematorium in April 1945

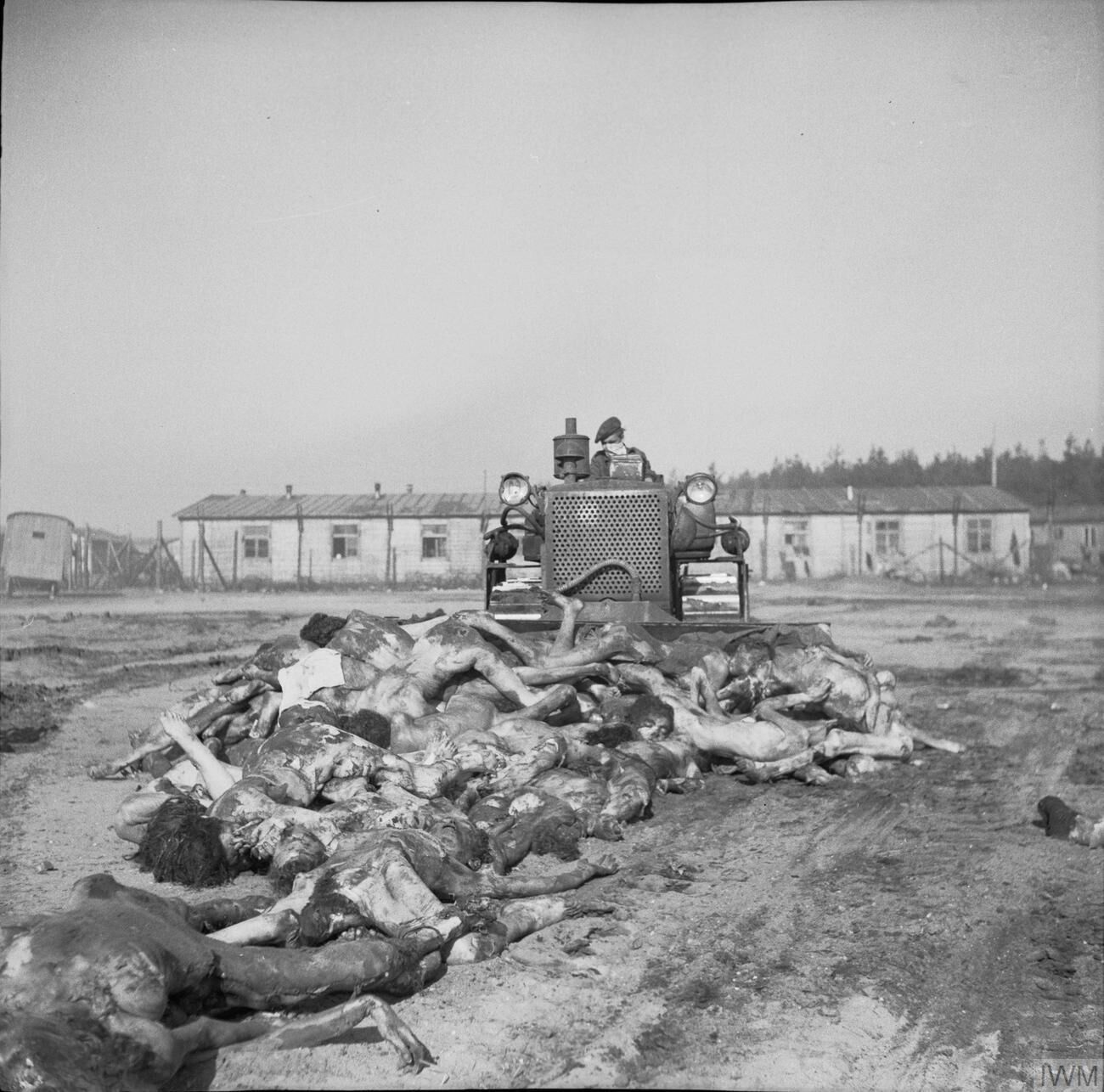
A British Army bulldozer pushes dead bodies into a mass grave at Belsen, April 19, 1945

Current estimates put the number of prisoners who passed through the concentration camp during its period of operation from 1943 to 1945 at around 120,000. Due to the destruction of the camp's files by the SS, not even half of them, around 55,000, are known by name. As mentioned above, treatment of prisoners by the SS varied between individual sections of the camp, with the inmates of the exchange camp generally being better treated than other prisoners, at least initially. However, in October 1943 the SS selected 1,800 men and women from the Sonderlager ("special camp"), Jews from Poland who held passports from Latin American countries. Since the governments of these nations mostly refused to honour the passports, these people had lost their value to the regime. Under the pretext of sending them to a fictitious "Lager Bergau", the SS had them transported to Auschwitz-Birkenau, where they were sent directly to the gas chambers and murdered. In February and May 1944 another 350 prisoners from the "special camp" were sent to Auschwitz. Thus, out of the total of 14,600 prisoners in the exchange camp, at least 3,550 died, more than 1,400 of them at Belsen, and around 2,150 at Auschwitz.

In the Männerlager (the male section of the "recovery camp"), inmates suffered even more from lack of care, malnourishment, disease and mistreatment by the guards. Thousands of them died. In the summer of 1944, at least 200 men were murdered by orders of the SS by being injected with phenol.

There were no gas chambers at Bergen-Belsen, since the mass murders took place in the camps further east. Nevertheless, current estimates put the number of deaths at Belsen at more than 50,000 Jews, Czechs, Poles, anti-Nazi Christians, homosexuals, and Roma and Sinti (Gypsies). Among them were French Resistance member Jean Maurice Paul Jules de Noailles, the 6th Duke of Ayen (on April 14, 1945), and Czech painter and writer Josef Čapek (estimated to be in April 1945), who had coined the word robot, popularised by his brother Karel Čapek.

The rate at which inmates died at Belsen accelerated notably after the mass transport of prisoners from other camps began in December 1944. From 1943 to the end of 1944 around 3,100 died. From January to mid-April 1945 this rose to around 35,000. Another 14,000 died after liberation between April 15 and the end of June 1945, in the Bergen-Belsen displaced persons camp under British authority.

Deaths at Bergen-Belsen concentration camp December 1944 to April 15, 1945
December 1944	at least 360
January 1945	around 1,200
February 1945	around 6,400
March 1945	at least 18,168
April 1945	around 10,000

After the war, there were allegations that the camp (or possibly a section of it), was "of a privileged nature", compared to others. A lawsuit filed by the Jewish community in Thessaloniki against 55 alleged collaborators claims that 53 of them were sent to Bergen-Belsen "as a special favor" granted by the Germans.

== Liberation ==
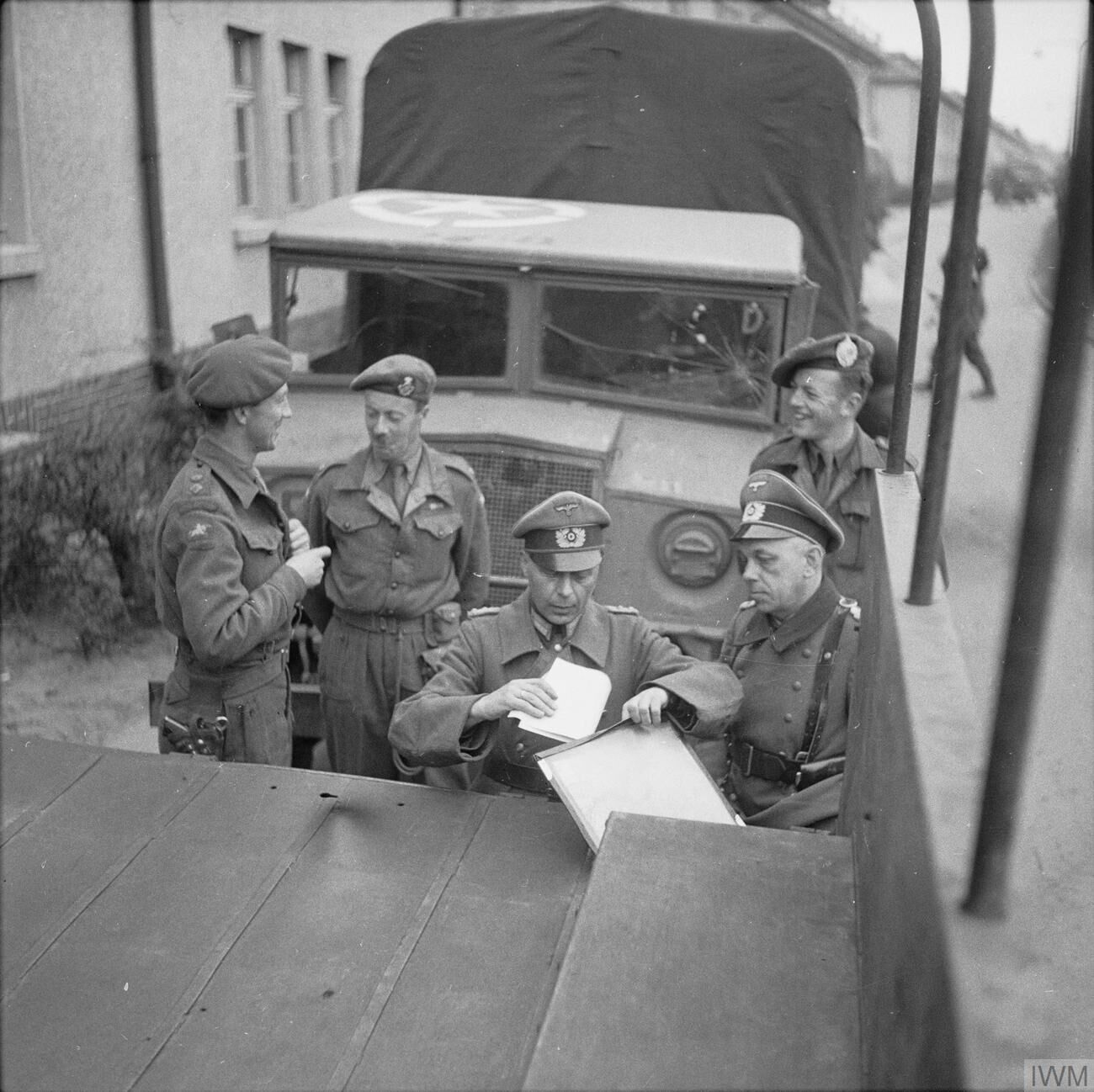
British and German officers finalize the arrangements for the ending of their temporary truce, April 1945

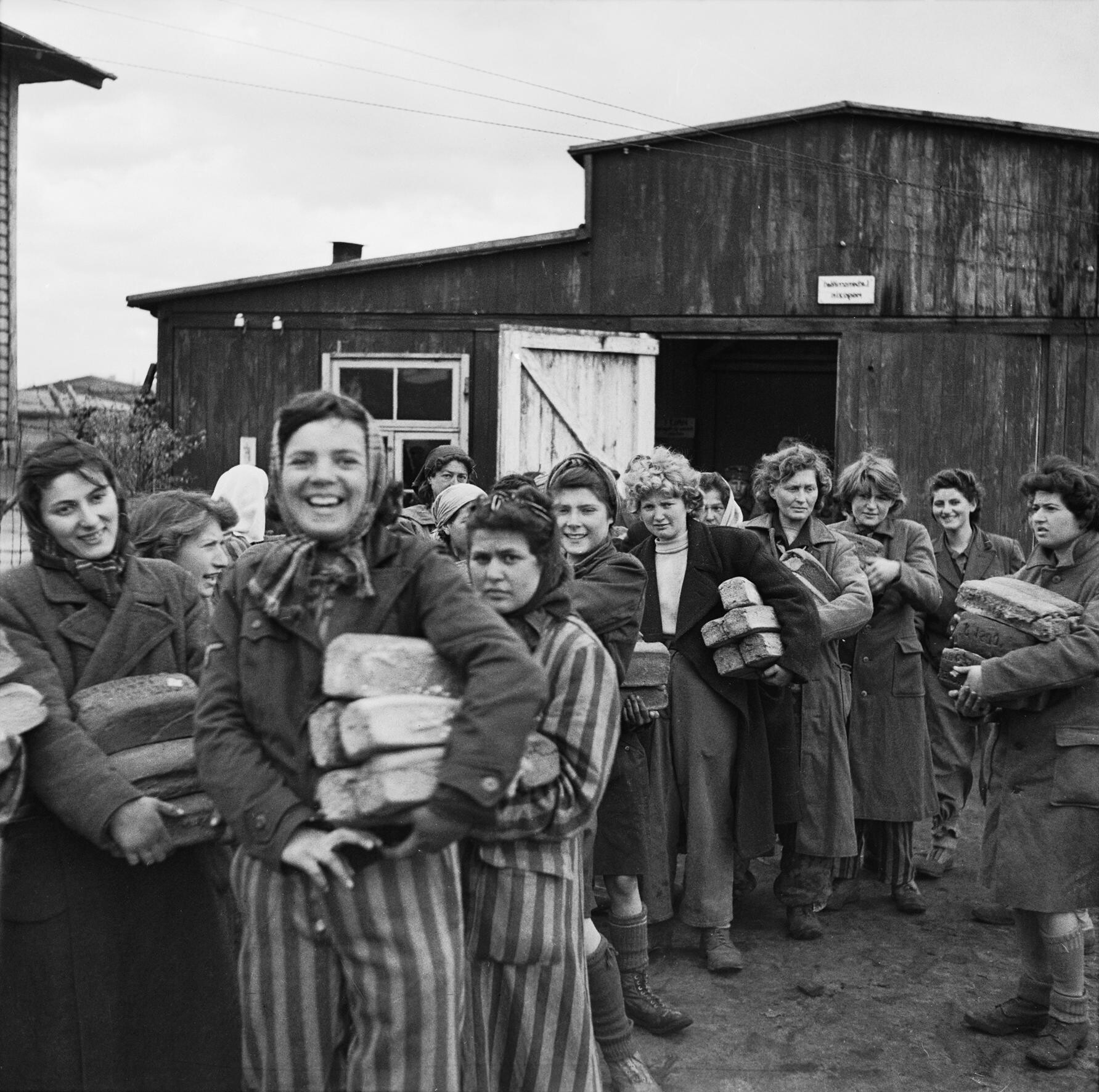
Women survivors in Bergen-Belsen, April 1945

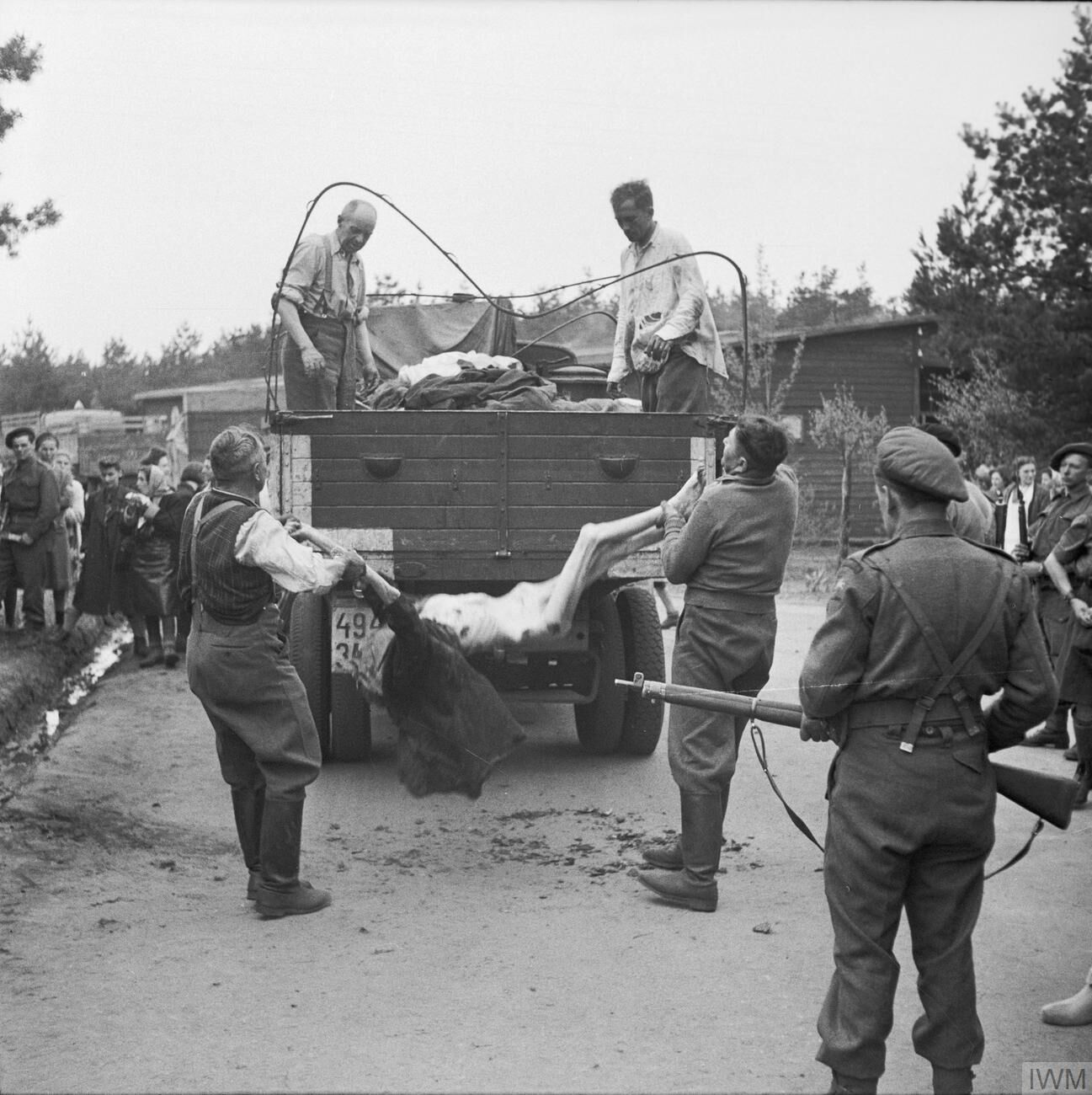
Former guards are made to load the bodies of dead prisoners onto a truck for burial, April 17–18, 1945

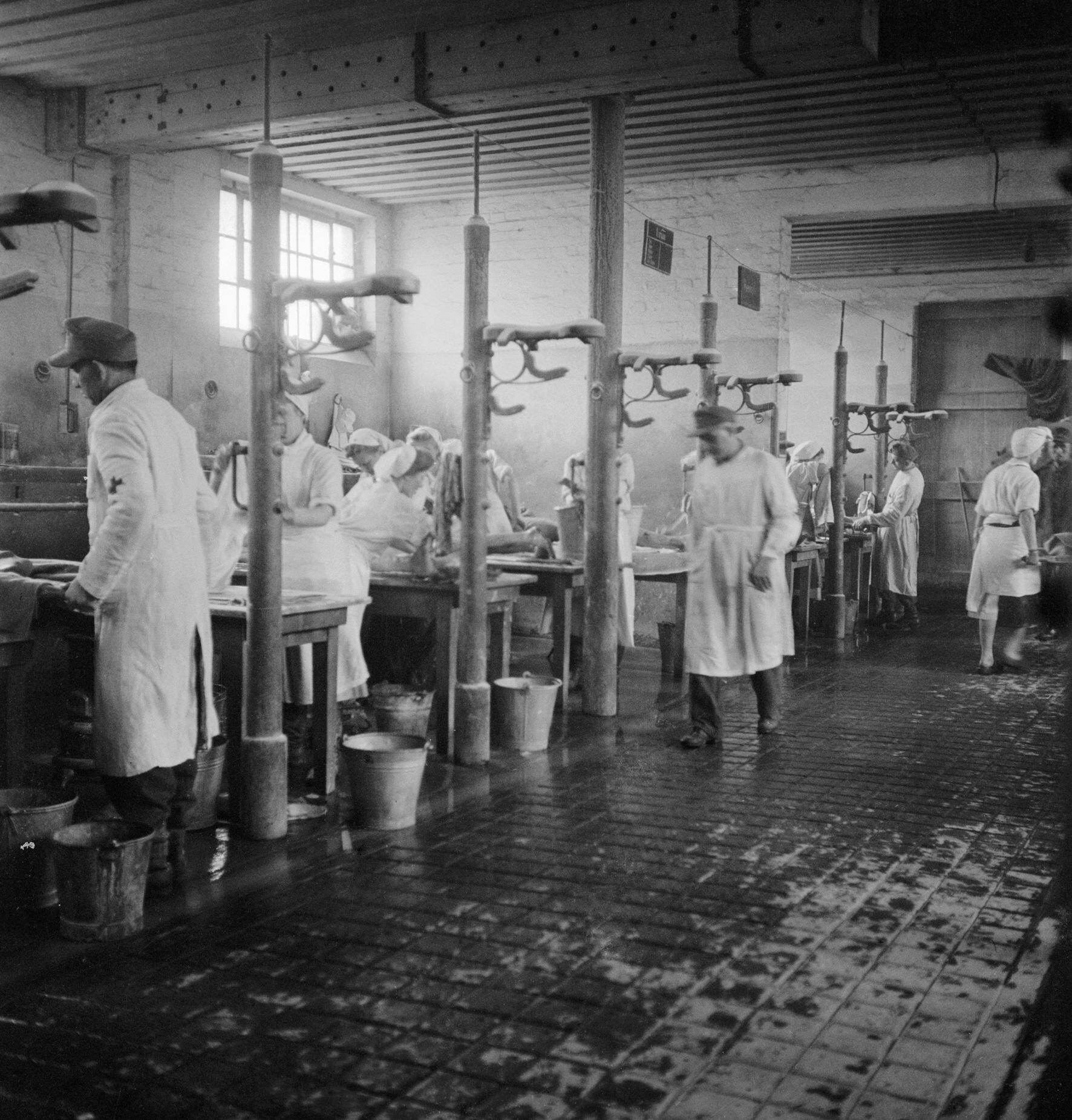
Some of the 60 tables, each staffed by two British medical students, at which the sick were deloused and treatment initiated, April 1945

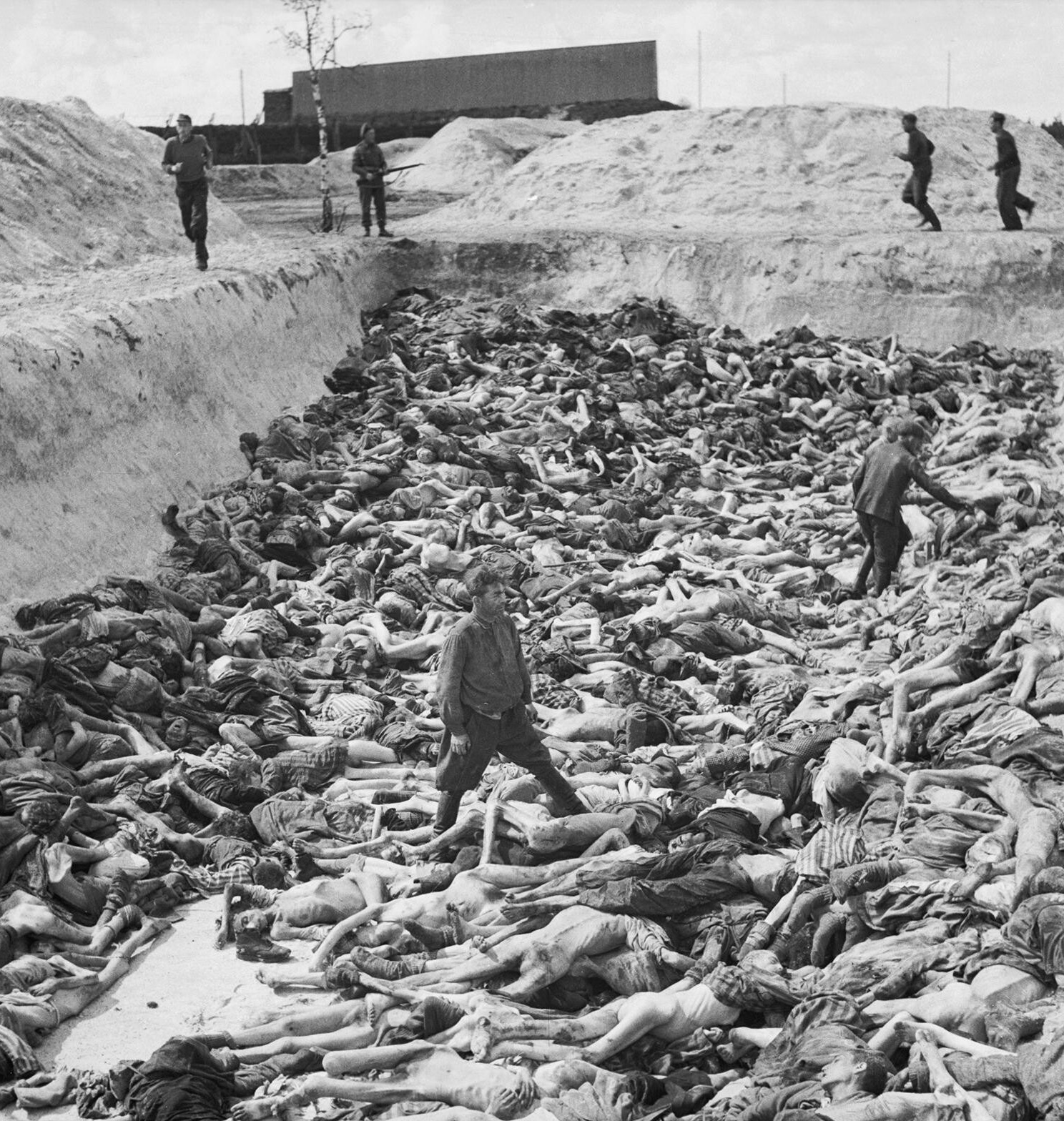
Fritz Klein stands amongst corpses in Mass Grave 3

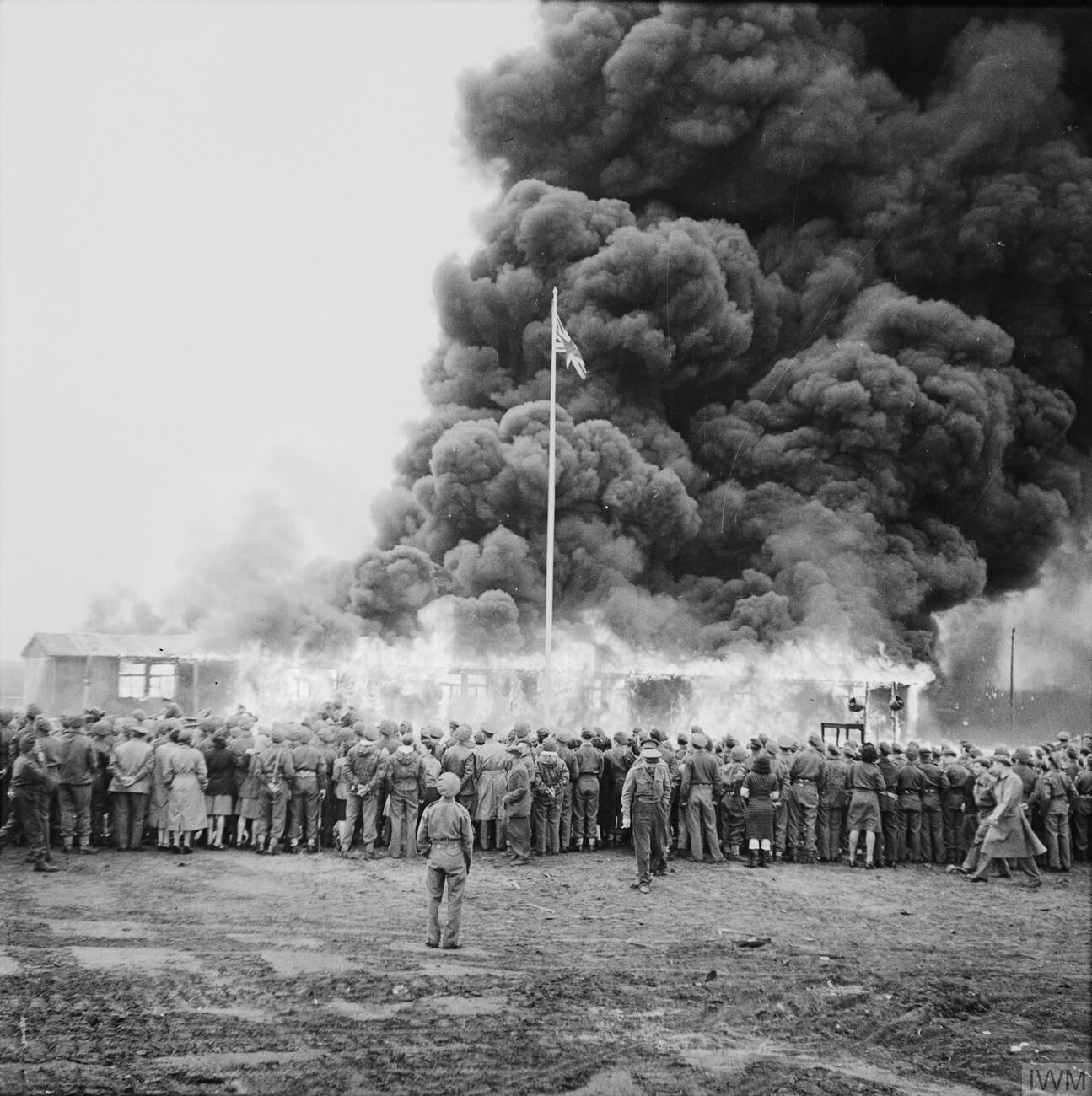
A crowd watches the destruction of the last camp hut

When the British and Canadians advanced on Bergen-Belsen in 1945, the German army negotiated a truce and exclusion zone around the camp to prevent the spread of typhus. On April 11, 1945 Heinrich Himmler (the Reichsführer SS) agreed to have the camp handed over without a fight. SS guards ordered prisoners to bury some of the dead. The next day, Wehrmacht representatives approached the British, D Squadron of the Inns of Court Regiment, at the bridge at Winsen and were brought to VIII Corps. At around 1 a.m. on April 13, an agreement was signed, designating an area of 48 square kilometers (19 square miles) around the camp as a neutral zone. Most of the SS were allowed to leave. Only a small number of SS men and women, including the camp commandant Kramer, remained to "uphold order inside the camp". The outside was guarded by Hungarian and regular German troops who were returned to the German front lines by the British shortly afterwards. Due to heavy fighting near Winsen and Walle, the British were unable to reach Bergen-Belsen on April 14, as originally planned. The camp was liberated on the afternoon of April 15, 1945. The first two to reach the camp were a British Special Air Service officer, Lieutenant John Randall, and his jeep driver, who were on a reconnaissance mission and discovered the camp by chance. American soldiers attached to the British forces also helped liberate the camp.

When British and Canadian troops finally entered they found over 13,000 unburied bodies and (including the satellite camps) around 60,000 inmates, most acutely sick and starving. The prisoners had been without food or water for days before the Allied arrival, partially due to Allied bombing. Immediately before and after liberation, prisoners were dying at around 500 per day, mostly from typhus. The scenes that greeted British troops were described by the BBC's Richard Dimbleby, who accompanied them:

...Here over an acre of ground lay dead and dying people. You could not see which was which... The living lay with their heads against the corpses and around them moved the awful, ghostly procession of emaciated, aimless people, with nothing to do and with no hope of life, unable to move out of your way, unable to look at the terrible sights around them ... Babies had been born here, tiny wizened things that could not live ... A mother, driven mad, screamed at a British sentry to give her milk for her child, and thrust the tiny mite into his arms, then ran off, crying terribly. He opened the bundle and found the baby had been dead for days. This day at Belsen was the most horrible of my life.

Initially lacking sufficient manpower, the British allowed the Hungarians to remain in charge and only commandant Kramer was arrested. Subsequently, SS and Hungarian guards shot and killed some of the starving prisoners who were trying to get their hands on food supplies from the store houses. The British started to provide emergency medical care, clothing and food. Immediately following the liberation, revenge killings took place in the satellite camp the SS had created in the area of the army barracks that later became Hohne-Camp. Around 15,000 prisoners from Mittelbau-Dora had been relocated there in early April. These prisoners were in much better physical condition than most of the others. Some of these men turned on those who had been their overseers at Mittelbau. About 170 of these "Kapos" were killed on April 15, 1945. On April 20, four German fighter planes attacked the camp, damaging the water supply and killing three British medical orderlies.

Over the next days the surviving prisoners were deloused and moved to a nearby German Panzer army camp, which became the Bergen-Belsen displaced persons camp. Over a period of four weeks, almost 29,000 of the survivors were moved to the displaced persons (DP) camp. Before the handover, the SS had managed to destroy the camp's administrative files, thereby eradicating most written evidence.

The British forced the former SS camp personnel to help bury the thousands of dead bodies in mass graves. The personnel were given starvation rations, not allowed to use gloves or other protective clothing, and were continuously shouted at and threatened to make sure that they did not stop working. Some of the bodies were so rotten that arms and legs tore away from the torso. Within two months, 17 staff members had died of typhus due to being forced to handle the bodies with no protection. Another committed suicide, and three others were shot and killed by British soldiers after trying to escape.

Some civil servants from Celle and Landkreis Celle were brought to Belsen and confronted with the crimes committed on their doorstep. Military photographers and cameramen of No. 5 Army Film and Photographic Unit documented the conditions in the camp and the measures of the British Army to ameliorate them. Many of the pictures they took and the films they made from April 15 to June 9, 1945, were published or shown abroad. Today, the originals are in the Imperial War Museum. These documents have a lasting impact on the international perception and memory of Nazi concentration camps to this day. According to Habbo Knoch, head of the institution that runs the memorial today: "Bergen-Belsen [...] became a synonym world-wide for German crimes committed during the time of Nazi rule."

Bergen-Belsen concentration camp was then burned to the ground by flamethrowing "Bren gun" carriers and Churchill Crocodile tanks because of the typhus epidemic and louse infestation. As the concentration camp ceased to exist at this point, the name Belsen after this time refers to events at the Bergen-Belsen DP camp.

There were massive efforts to help the survivors with food and medical treatment, led by Brigadier Glyn Hughes, deputy director of Medical Services of 2nd Army, and James Johnston, the Senior Medical Officer. Despite their efforts, about another 9,000 died in April, and by the end of June 1945 another 4,000 had died (13,994 total deaths after liberation).

Two specialist teams were dispatched from Britain to deal with the feeding problem. The first, led by A. P. Meiklejohn, included 96 medical student volunteers from London teaching hospitals who were later credited with significantly reducing the death rate amongst prisoners. A research team led by Janet Vaughan was dispatched by the Medical Research Council to test the effectiveness of various feeding regimes.

The British troops and medical staff tried these diets to feed the prisoners, in this order:

- Bully beef from Army rations. Most of the prisoners' digestive systems were in too weak a state from long-term starvation to handle such food.
- Skimmed milk. The result was a bit better, but still insufficient for recovery.
- Bengal Famine Mixture. This is a rice-and-sugar-based mixture which had achieved good results after the Bengal famine of 1943, but it proved less suitable to Europeans than to Bengalis because of the differences in the food to which they were accustomed. Adding the common ingredient paprika to the mixture made it more palatable to these people and recovery started.

Some were too weak to even consume the Bengal Famine Mixture. Intravenous feeding was attempted but abandoned. SS doctors had previously used injections to murder prisoners, so some panicked at the sight of the intravenous feeding equipment.

== Aftermath ==
=== Legal prosecution ===
Many of the former SS staff who survived the typhus epidemic were tried by the British military at the Belsen trial. Over the period in which Bergen-Belsen operated as a concentration camp, at least 480 people had worked as guards or members of the commandant's staff, including around 45 women. From September 17 to November 17, 1945, 45 of those were tried by a military tribunal in Lüneburg. They included former commandant Josef Kramer, 16 other SS male members, 16 female SS guards and 12 former kapos (one of whom became ill during the trial). Among them were Irma Grese, Elisabeth Volkenrath, Hertha Ehlert, Ilse Lothe, Johanna Bormann and Fritz Klein. Many of the defendants were not just charged with crimes committed at Belsen but also earlier ones at Auschwitz. Their activities at other concentration camps such as Mittelbau-Dora, Ravensbrück, Neuengamme, the Gross Rosen subcamps at Neusalz and Langenleuba, and the Mittelbau-Dora subcamp at Gross Werther were not subject of the trial. It was based on British military law and the charges were thus limited to war crimes. Substantial media coverage of the trial provided the German and international public with detailed information on the mass killings at Belsen as well as on the gas chambers of Auschwitz-Birkenau.

Eleven of the defendants were sentenced to death. They included Kramer, Volkenrath and Klein. The executions by hanging took place on December 13, 1945, in Hamelin. Fourteen defendants were acquitted (one was excluded from the trial due to illness). Of the remaining 19, one was sentenced to life in prison but he was executed for another crime. Eighteen were sentenced to prison for periods of one to 15 years; most of these sentences were subsequently reduced significantly on appeals or pleas for clemency. By June 1955, the last of those sentenced in the Belsen trial had been released. Ten other members of the Belsen personnel were tried by later military tribunals in 1946 and 1948, with five of them being executed.

Denazification courts were created by the Allies to try members of the SS and other Nazi organisations. Between 1947 and 1949 these courts initiated proceedings against at least 46 former SS staff at Belsen. Around half of these were discontinued, mostly because the defendants were considered to have been forced to join the SS. Those who were sentenced received prison terms of between four and 36 months or were fined. As the judges decided to count the time the defendants had spent in Allied internment towards the sentence, the terms were considered to have already been fully served.

Only one trial was ever held by a German court for crimes committed at Belsen, at Jena in 1949; the defendant was acquitted. More than 200 other SS members who were at Belsen have been known by name but never had to stand trial. No German soldier was ever put on trial for crimes committed against the inmates of the POW camps at Bergen-Belsen, although some were tried for participating in death marches headed towards Bergen-Belsen and in the region around it, despite the fact that the International Military Tribunal at Nuremberg had found in 1946 that the treatment of Soviet POWs by the Wehrmacht constituted a war crime.

=== Memorial ===
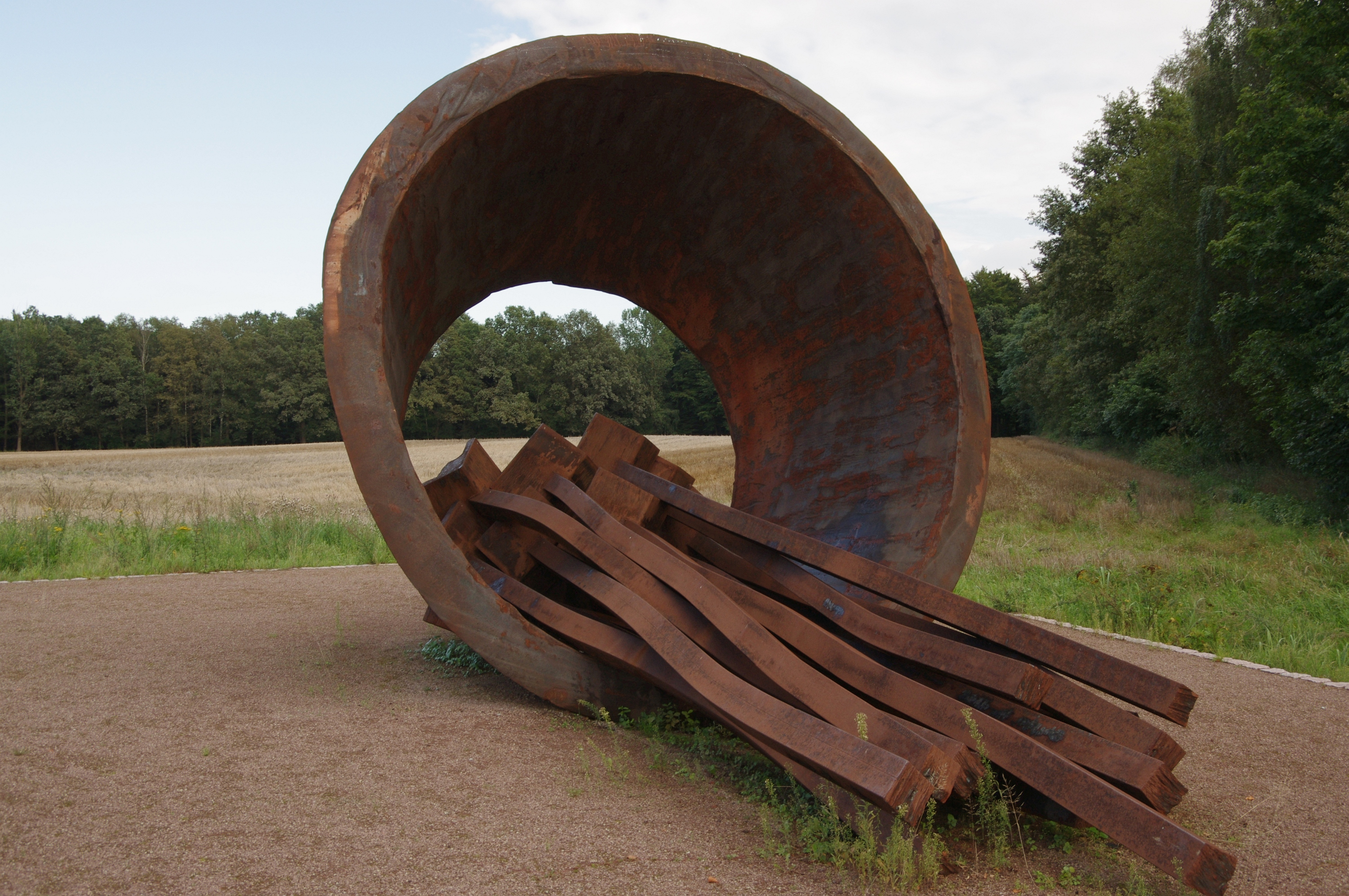
Memorial on the ramp where prisoners arrived

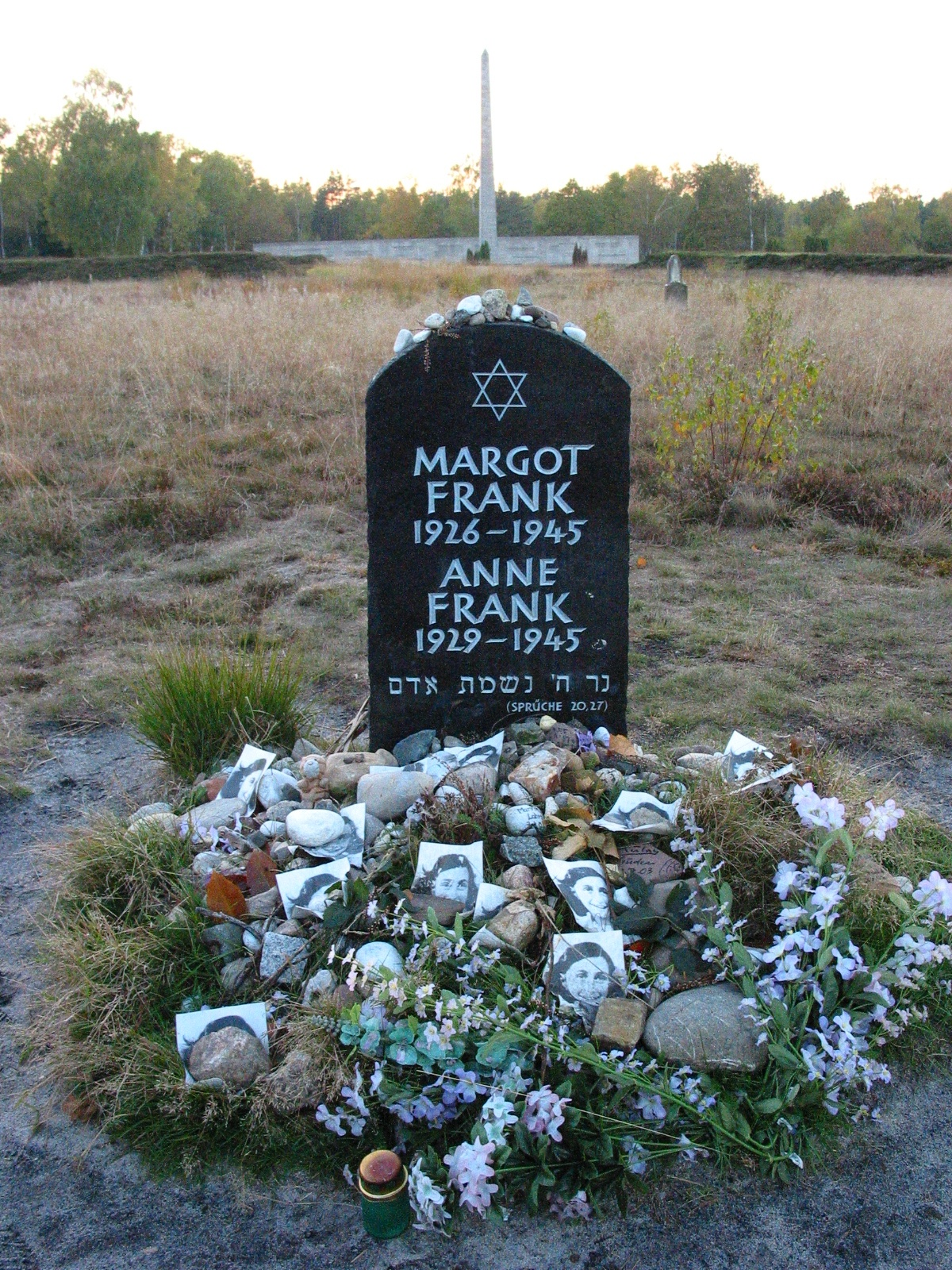
Memorial for Margot and Anne Frank at the Bergen-Belsen site

The area of the former Bergen-Belsen camp fell into neglect after the burning of the buildings and the closure of the nearby displaced persons' camp in the summer of 1950. The area reverted to heath; few traces of the camp remained. However, as early as May 1945, the British had erected large signs at the former camp site. Ex-prisoners began to set up monuments. A first wooden memorial was built by Jewish DPs in September 1945, followed by one made in stone, dedicated on the first anniversary of the liberation in 1946. On November 2, 1945, a large wooden cross was dedicated as a memorial to the murdered Polish prisoners. In addition, by the end of 1945, the Soviets had built a memorial at the entrance to the POW cemetery. A memorial to the Italian POWs followed in 1950, but was removed when the bodies were reinterred in a Hamburg cemetery.

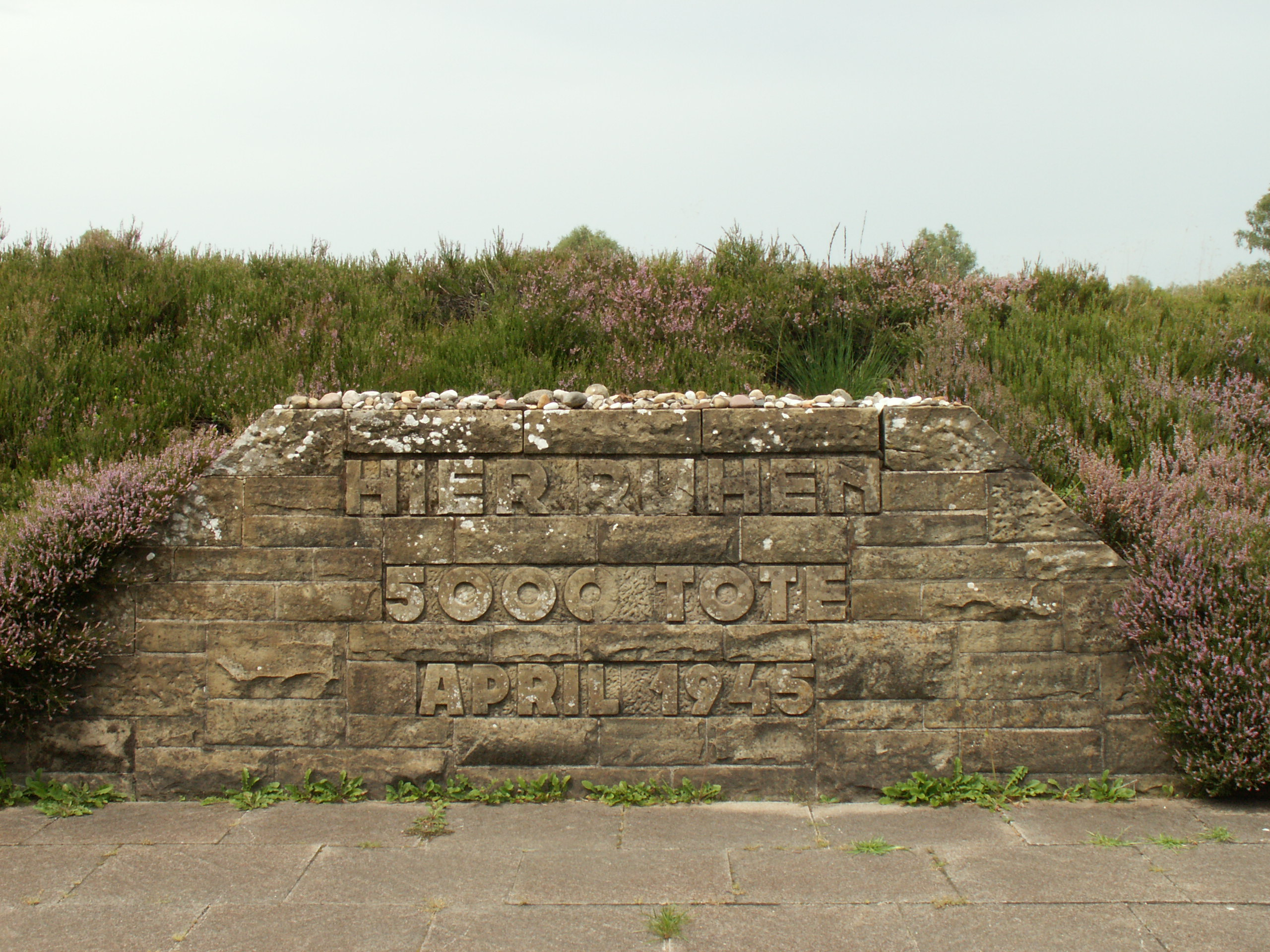
One of several mass graves on the site of the former camp; the sign simply reads: '"Here lie 5,000 dead. April 1945"

The British military authorities ordered the construction of a permanent memorial in September 1945 after having been lambasted by the press for the desolate state of the camp. In the summer of 1946, a commission presented the design plan, which included the obelisk and memorial walls. The memorial was finally inaugurated in a large ceremony in November 1952, with the participation of Germany's president Theodor Heuss, who called on the Germans never to forget what had happened at Belsen.

For a long time, however, remembering Bergen-Belsen was not a political priority. Periods of attention were followed by long phases of official neglect. For much of the 1950s, Belsen "was increasingly forgotten as a place of remembrance". Only after 1957 did large groups of young people visit the place where Anne Frank had died. After anti-Semitic graffiti was scrawled on the Cologne synagogue over Christmas 1959, German chancellor Konrad Adenauer followed a suggestion by Nahum Goldmann, president of the World Jewish Congress, and visited the site of a former concentration camp for the first time. In a speech at the Bergen-Belsen memorial, Adenauer assured the Jews still living in Germany that they would have the same respect and security as everyone else. Afterwards, the German public saw the Belsen memorial as primarily a Jewish place of remembrance. Nevertheless, the memorial was redesigned in 1960–61. In 1966, a document centre was opened which offered a permanent exhibition on the persecution of the Jews, with a focus on events in the nearby Netherlands – where Anne Frank and her family had been arrested in 1944. This was complemented by an overview of the history of the Bergen-Belsen camp. This was the first ever permanent exhibit anywhere in Germany on the topic of Nazi crimes. However, there was still no scientific personnel at the site, with only a caretaker as permanent staff. Memorial events were only organized by the survivors themselves.

In October 1979, the president of the European Parliament Simone Veil, herself a survivor of Auschwitz and Bergen-Belsen, came to the memorial for a speech which focused on the Nazi persecution of Roma and Sinti. This was the first time that an official event in Germany acknowledged this aspect of the Nazi era.

President Reagan's remarks at Bergen-Belsen Concentration Camp in West Germany, May 5, 1985

In 1985, international attention was focused on Bergen-Belsen. The camp was hastily included in Ronald Reagan's itinerary when he visited West Germany after a controversy about a visit to a cemetery where the interred included members of the Waffen SS (see Bitburg controversy). Shortly before Reagan's visit on May 5, there had been a large memorial event on the occasion of the 40th anniversary of the camp's liberation, which had been attended by German president Richard von Weizsäcker and chancellor Helmut Kohl. In the aftermath of these events, the parliament of Lower Saxony decided to expand the exhibition centre and to hire permanent scientific staff. In 1990, the permanent exhibition was replaced by a new version and a larger document building was opened.

Only in 2000 did the Federal Government of Germany begin to financially support the memorial. Co-financed by the state of Lower Saxony, a complete redesign was planned which was intended to be more in line with contemporary thought on exhibition design. On April 15, 2005, there was a ceremony, commemorating the 60th anniversary of the liberation and many ex-prisoners and ex-liberating troops attended. In October 2007, the redesigned memorial site was opened, including a large new Documentation Centre and permanent exhibition on the edge of the newly redefined camp, whose structure and layout can now be traced. Since 2009, the memorial has been receiving funding from the Federal government on an ongoing basis.

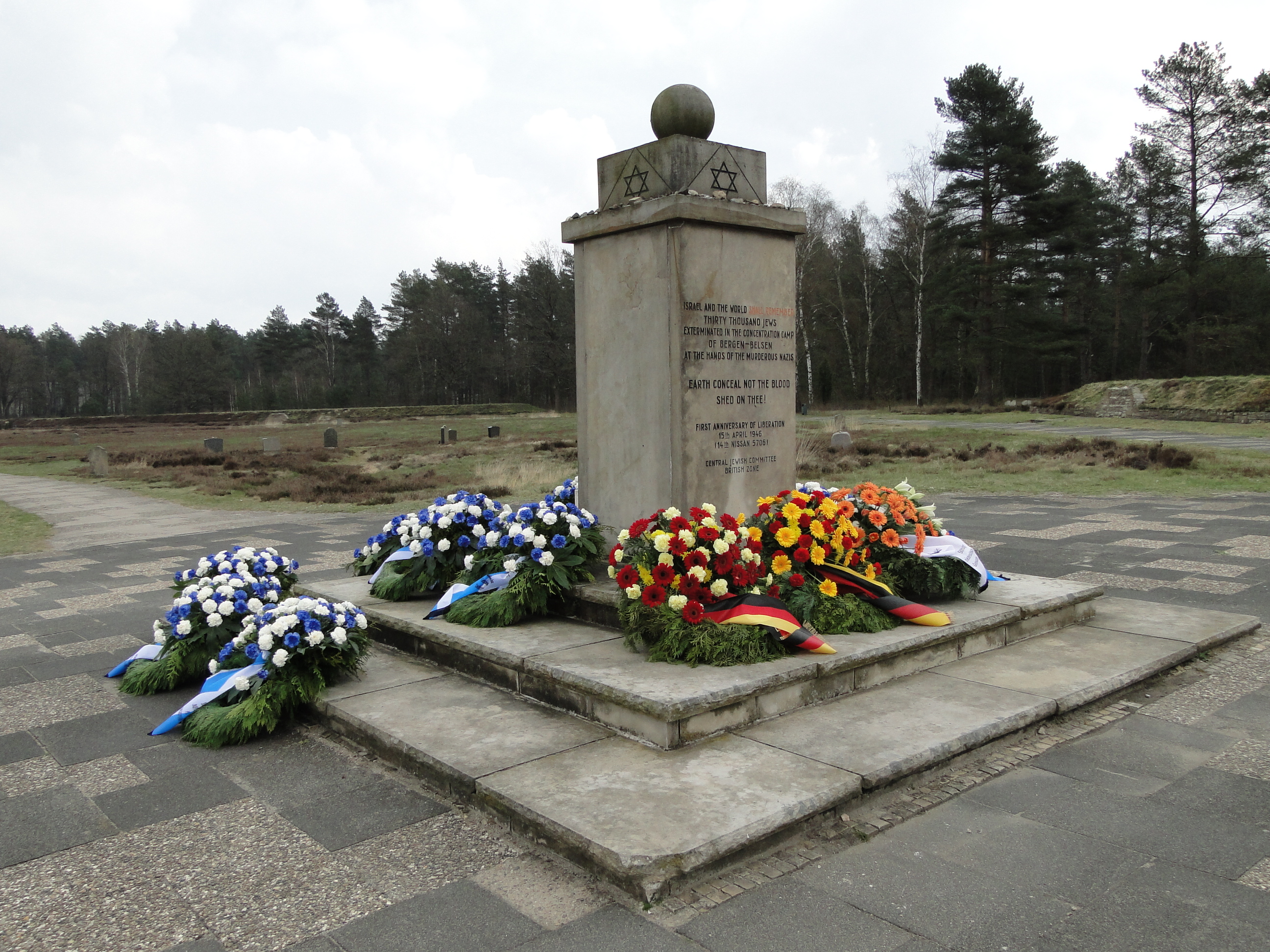
The Jewish Memorial at the site of the former camp, decorated with wreaths on Liberation Day, April 15, 2012

The site is open to the public and includes monuments to the dead, including a successor to the wooden cross of 1945, some individual memorial stones and a "House of Silence" for reflection. In addition to the Jewish, Polish and Dutch national memorials, a memorial to eight Turkish citizens who were killed at Belsen was dedicated in December 2012.

== Personal accounts ==
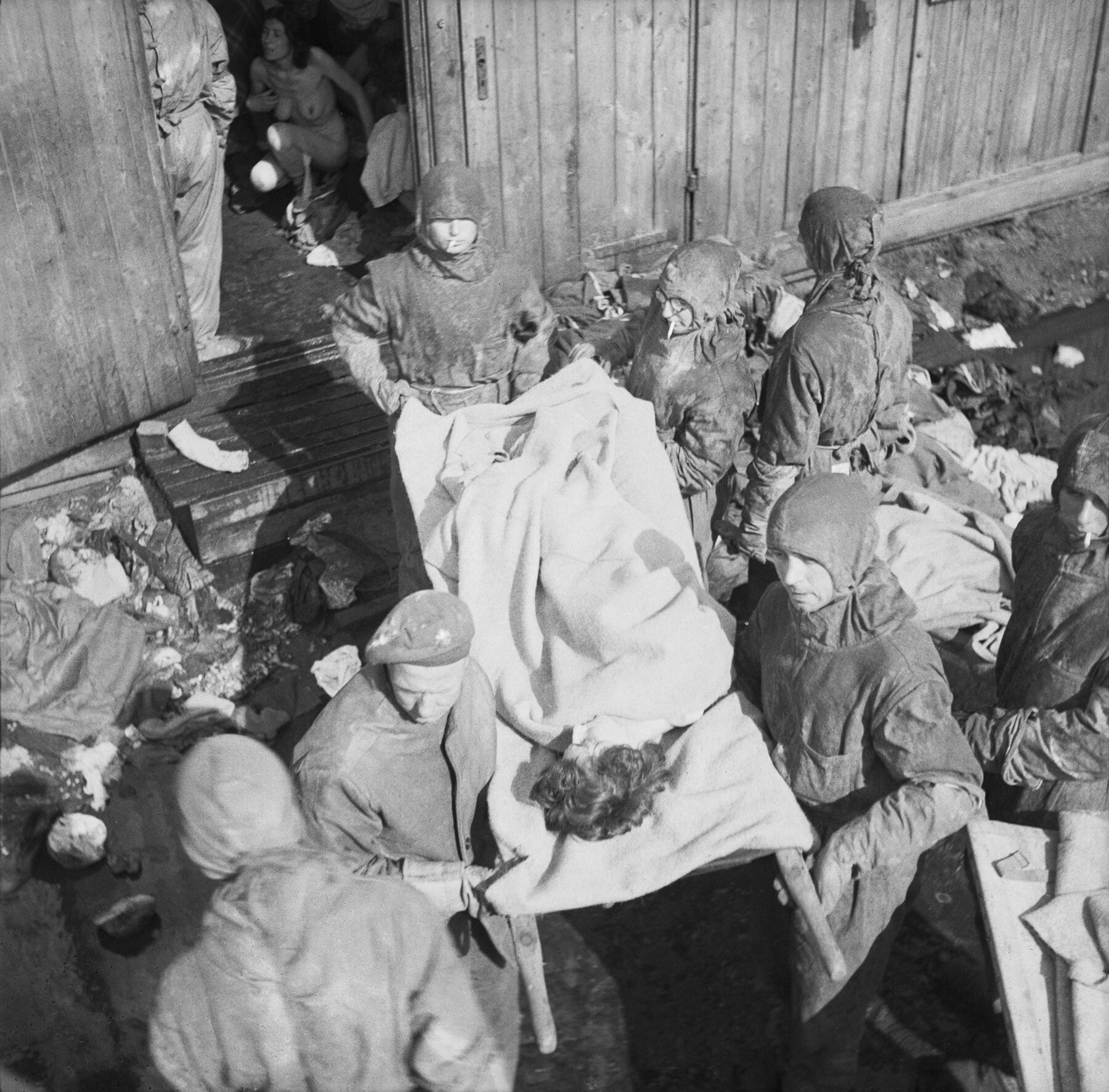
The liberation of Bergen-Belsen, April 1945

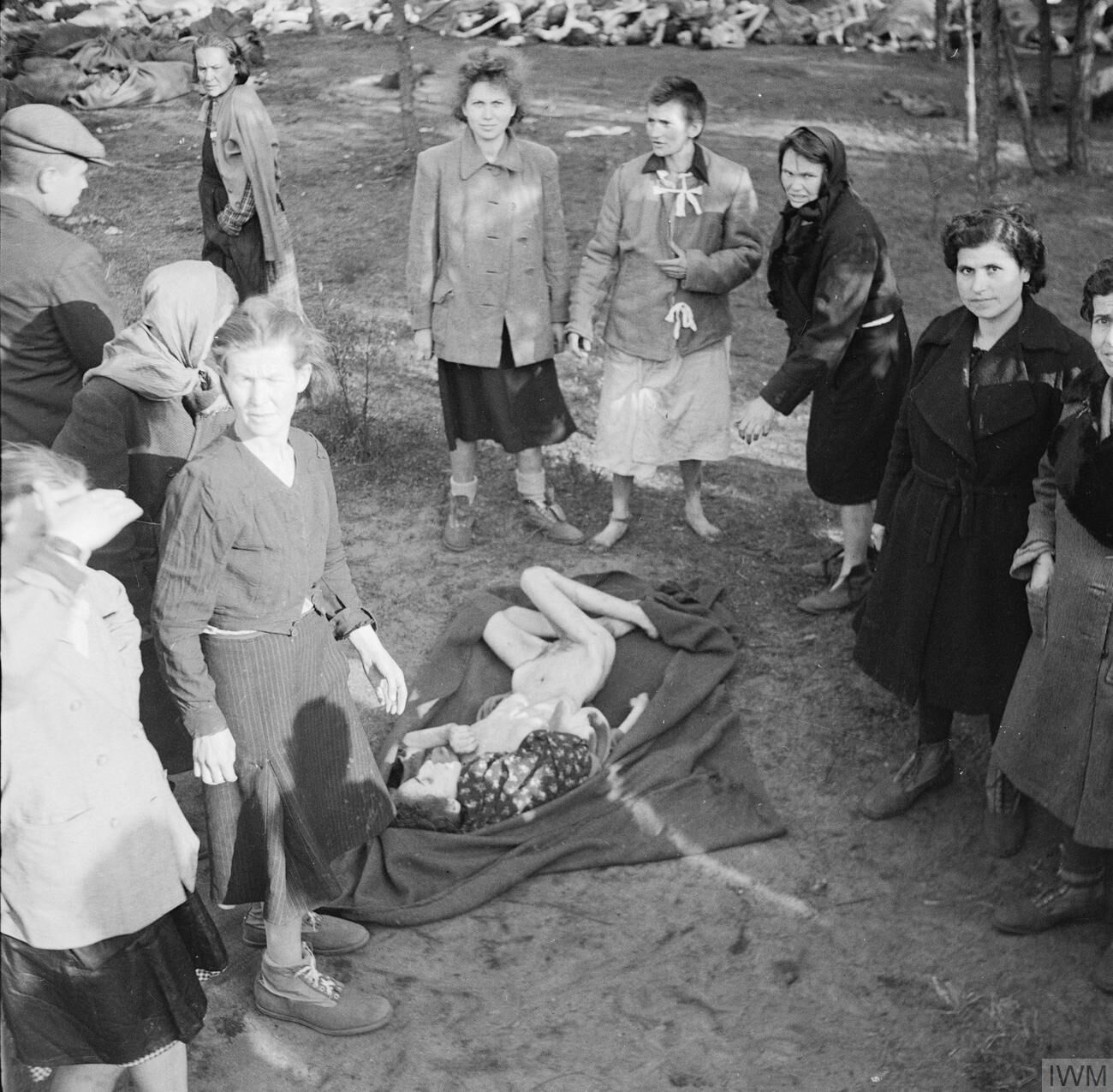
Liberated women inmates gaze at the naked body of a woman who died of starvation

- The British comedian Michael Bentine, who took part in the liberation of the camp, wrote this on his encounter with Belsen:

Millions of words have been written about these horror camps, many of them by inmates of those unbelievable places. I've tried, without success, to describe it from my own point of view, but the words won't come. To me Belsen was the ultimate blasphemy.

- Memories of Anne Frank, a book written by Alison Leslie Gold on the recollections of Hannah Goslar, a friend of Anne Frank
- Mervin Willett Gonin DSO wrote about the immediate aftermath to the liberation of Bergen-Belsen in his diary.
- Leslie Hardman, Rabbi and British Army Chaplain, was the first Jewish chaplain to enter the camp, two days after its liberation, and published his account in the collective book Belsen in History and Memory.
- In Bergen-Belsen 1945: A Medical Student's Journal, volunteer Michael Hargrave gives his first-hand testimony of working at the displaced persons camp after liberation.
- Anita Lasker-Wallfisch describes life in Belsen, its liberation and her stay at the displaced persons camp in her autobiography Inherit the Truth.
- Shaul Ladany, who was in the camp as an 8-year-old and later survived the Munich Massacre at the 1972 Summer Olympics.
- In his book From Belsen to Buckingham Palace Paul Oppenheimer tells of the events leading up to the internment of his whole family at the camp and their incarceration there between February 1944 and April 1945, when he was aged 14–15. Following publication of the book, Oppenheimer personally talked to many groups and schools about the events he witnessed. This work was continued by his brother Rudi, who shared the experiences.
- Leonard Webb, British veteran from the liberation of the camp.
- Describing the concentration camp, Major Dick Williams, one of the first British soldiers to enter and liberate the camp, said: "It was an evil, filthy place; a hell on Earth."
- Abel Herzberg wrote the diary Between Two Streams (Dutch: Tweestromenland) during his internment in Bergen-Belsen
- British servicemen Denis Norden and Eric Sykes, who later became popular comedians, stumbled upon the camp in 1945 shortly after liberation; "Appalled, aghast, repelled – it is difficult to find words to express how we felt as we looked upon the degradation of some of the inmates not yet repatriated," Sykes later wrote. "They squatted in their thin, striped uniforms, unmoving bony structures who could have been anywhere between 30 and 60 years old, staring ahead with dead, hopeless eyes and incapable of feeling any relief at their deliverance."
- A number of British artists depicted the aftermath of the liberation of the camp. These included Eric Taylor, Leslie Cole, Doris Zinkeisen, Mary Kessell and Edgar Ainsworth.
- In his 2011 autobiography I Was a Boy in Belsen, Holocaust survivor Tomi Reichental recounts his experiences as a prisoner in the Bergen- Belsen concentration camp.
- In the Dead Years: Holocaust Memoirs (ISBN 9789492371164), published by Amsterdam Publishers, survivor Joseph Schupack (1922-1989) tells about his last camp, Bergen-Belsen (pp. 173–174):
- And the Month Was May: A Memoir (ISBN 9781440140846) by Lilian Berliner traces the life of Berliner, from her childhood in Hungary, to the concentration camps of Auschwitz and Bergen Belsen, to her eventual liberation and resettlement in New York.

After a day's journey, we arrived at Bergen-Belsen. This concentration camp was hopelessly overcrowded and we were not accepted. The right hand no longer knew what the left hand was doing, so we were sent to an adjoining Wehrmacht compound. As the soldiers of the Wehrmacht marched out, we moved in. The confusion was unbelievable; this time it was disorder with German perfection. We were moved into clean barracks, equipped for human beings with excellent bathrooms and clean beds stacked three on top of each other. After all we had experienced in the preceding year, this was sheer luxury. There was no mention of the usual camp rituals, no roll calls and no work, but also no food.

- CMK Parsons, a British Army chaplain and great-grandfather of British artist Tom Marshall photographed his time at the camp, including the burning of the huts. His photos were published in 2015.
- Lieutenant Colonel Mervin Willett Gonin DSO

It was shortly after the British Red Cross arrived, though it may have no connection, that a very large quantity of lipstick arrived. This was not at all what we men wanted, we were screaming for hundreds and thousands of other things and I don't know who asked for lipstick. I wish so much that I could discover who did it, it was the action of genius, sheer unadulterated brilliance. I believe nothing did more for those internees than the lipstick. Women lay in bed with no sheets and no nightie but with scarlet red lips, you saw them wandering about with nothing but a blanket over their shoulders, but with scarlet red lips. I saw a woman dead on the post mortem table and clutched in her hand was a piece of lipstick. At last someone had done something to make them individuals again, they were someone, no longer merely the number tattooed on the arm. At last they could take an interest in their appearance. That lipstick started to give them back their humanity.

- Belsen Uncovered by Derrick Sington (1946)

The twentieth century has so far produced no more terrifying example of collective human wickedness than the Belsen Concentration Camp, a black spot which it fell to the lot of the British Army to occupy. This book is the personal story of the first British officer to enter the camp on its liberation and the last to leave, after a stay of five months. The author and two of his N.C.O.'s between them spoke five languages, so they had unrivalled opportunities for discovering what the inmates, men, women and children, experienced and felt. The evil which produced the concentration camps is fully exposed, and here too will be found a record of how the psychological and medical problems were tackled, as well as such complicated matters as supplies, welfare and rehabilitation.

- Liberating Belsen Concentration Camp: A Personal Account by Leonard Berney (former) Lt-Colonel Leonard Berney R.A. T.D. (2015)

But what should you do when faced with 60,000 dead, sick and dying people? We were in the army to fight a war and to beat the enemy. We were good at that, having been in combat for the last ten months, but none of us had any experience of dealing with the situation in Belsen and we were all more or less traumatized by the sights we had seen. I myself, although a 'senior officer', had turned 25 years of age only a few days before. Most of the men sent to deal with that human disaster were in their late teens or early twenties, even younger than I was. What we suddenly found ourselves faced with was beyond anyone's comprehension

== Media ==
Vocal
BBC recording from April 20, 1945 of Jewish survivors of the Bergen-Belsen concentration camp singing Hatikvah, today the national anthem of Israel, only five days after their liberation by Allied forces. (The words sung are from the original poem by Naftali Herz Imber.)

- The Relief of Belsen (2007 film)
- Frontline: "Memory of the Camps" (May 7, 1985, Season 3, Episode 18), is a 56-minute television documentary that addresses Bergen-Belsen and other Nazi concentration camps
- Memorandum (1965 film)
- Night Will Fall is a 2014 documentary film that includes video footage shot by British armed forces upon their liberation of Bergen-Belsen
- A protagonist in the novel The Lüneburg Variation by Paolo Maurensig describes the deprivations he suffered at Bergen-Belsen, "...only then did I understand that we'd been playing for human lives, lives that in Bergen-Belsen were worth less than a pfennig, less than a handful of dried beans."
- What They Found is a 2025 television documentary film directed by Sam Mendes for BBC Two

== Notable inmates ==
This list contains some of the notable people who were imprisoned in the Bergen-Belsen concentration camp. With the exception of those marked as survivors, they all died there.

- Julius Adler – a German Communist politician
- Eduard Alexander – a German Communist politician
- Alex Aronson (survived) – a Dutch aid worker executed in Ba'athist Iraq
- Kalmi Baruh – a Bosnian Jewish scholar in the field of Judeo-Spanish language
- Hélène Berr – a French woman of Jewish ancestry who documented her life in a diary during the time of Nazi occupation of France
- Thierry de Briey – a Belgian equestrian and Belgian Resistance member
- Bruno Brodniewicz – the first Lagerälteste (camp elder) of the Auschwitz concentration camp
- Braulia Cánovas - (survived) Spanish Republican who fought in French Resistance as "Monique".
- Josef Čapek – a Czech artist
- Madeleine Dreyfus (survived) - a French resistance member
- Amédée Dunois – a French lawyer, journalist and politician
- Adrien d'Esclaibes d'Hust – French city mayor, lawyer, scout leader and resistant
- Ernst Flersheim – a German Jewish art collector
- Anne and Margot Frank, who both died of typhus there in February or March 1945, shortly before the camp was liberated on April 15, 1945.
- Marianne Franken – a Dutch painter
- Hanneli Goslar (survived) – a friend of Anne Frank, spoke about memories of Frank after surviving Bergen-Belsen.
- Oscar Ihlebæk – a Norwegian newspaper editor and resistance member
- Mirjam Jacobson – a Dutch painter
- Heinrich Jasper – a German politician
- Johnny & Jones, actually Nol (Arnold Siméon) van Wesel and Max (Salomon Meyer) Kannewasser – a jazz duo
- Józef Klukowski – a Polish sculptor
- Suzanne Kohn – a French Jew born into one of France's most prominent Jewish families
- Shaul Ladany (survived) – an Israeli Olympic athlete and survivor of the Munich massacre
- Karl Landauer – a German psychoanalyst
- Rywka Lipszyc – a Polish-Jewish teenage girl who wrote a personal diary while in the Łódź Ghetto
- Augustin Malroux – a French socialist politician and member of the French Resistance
- Jean Maurice Paul Jules de Noailles – a member of the French Resistance
- Uri Orlev (survived) - a Polish-Israeli children's author
- Gino Parin – an Italian painter of Jewish ancestry
- Gisella Perl (survived) – a Hungarian doctor and author
- Julius Philipp – a German-born metal trader
- Yvonne Rudellat – an agent of the Special Operations Executive
- Zuzana Růžičková (survived) – a Czech harpsichordist
- Felice Schragenheim – a Jewish resistance fighter
- Benjamin Marius Telders – a professor of law at Leiden University
- Georges Valois – a French journalist and national syndicalist politician
- Arthur Vanderpoorten – a Belgian liberal politician and minister
- Gerardus van der Wel – a Dutch long-distance runner
- Julius Wolff – a Dutch mathematician

== See also ==
- Holocaust Memorial Day
- Holocaust memorial landscapes in Germany
- List of Nazi concentration camps
- Alan Moore (war artist)
