= Vorzugsjude =

Special class of Jewish prisoners during WW2

Vorzugsjude (or Austauschjude; literally 'preferred Jew' or 'trading Jew') was a classification of Jewish prisoners of Nazi Germany based on the Nuremberg racial laws of 1935 that were deemed suitable for exchanging with foreign nations in return for the release of German internees or war materials. These people were held in Bergen-Belsen concentration camp.

== History ==
Several German prisoners' freedom were sought by the Nazi government. They had originally sought to use imprisoned civilians they had taken at the start of World War II, embassy staff, sailors, and medics, but lacking leverage chose to earmark certain Jewish prisoners with dual citizenship or relations to negotiate the release of their prisoners.

Originally these "exchange Jews" were gathered in several different locations: the Vittel internment camp, in Liebenau, in Wurzach, Laufen (Ilag VII), and Tittmoning (Oflag VII-C/Z). The Nazis sequestered prisoners there to be available for exchange. But they chose to change this system and create a larger facility to house the exchange Jews, although the Liebenau (for women) and Laufen camps continued to see use for holding exchange prisoners.

=== Bergen-Belson ===
In the spring of 1943, Heinrich Himmler ordered the expansion of the Bergen-Belsen concentration camp, sequestering part of the camp and developing an additional area meant to hold approximately 10,000 Jews, who were to be held back for exchange or as leverage in the procurement of foreign currency and raw materials. Others interned there held the citizenship of neutral or other axis states and were intended to serve as hostages for the good behavior of the governments of those countries. The Aufenthaltslager, or 'holding camp,' as this addition was referred to was to be under the authority of SS-Hauptsturmführer Adolf Haas who had just transferred from Niederhagen concentration camp to oversee the construction of Bergen-Belsen.

Between the July of 1943 and December of 1944 at least 14,600 Jews, including 2,750 minors, were transported to this 'holding camp,' then referred to as the "Star camp," within Bergen-Belson. These Vorzugsjude were still pressed into labor, notably scavenging the shoes of executed Jews from extermination camps for reusable leather, clearing tree stumps from area around the camp, and working in the kitchens. A total of only around 2,560 Jewish prisoners were ever actually transported from Bergen-Belsen and released.

Originally many of these Jews were Polish Jews who claimed American citizenship or had close family in the United States; the Nazi government felt these connections could serve for German civilian exchange. In the fall of 1943, these Polish Jews were sent out of the camp to be murdered as the S.S. and RSHA felt these Jews were not of value to the United States and their knowledge of the Holocaust could result in international outcry against the killings that were underway, which at that point was still being questioned. They were primarily replaced by Dutch Jews and Jews with Latin American passports, believing that both these populations were not only valuable hostages, but were not aware of the wider Holocaust as the Polish Jews had been. Another often cited means of being considered for this status was possession of a certificate rendering one a citizen or relative of a citizen of the British Mandate for Palestine.

As the War came to a close, the conditions for these Jews worsened, however, members of Nazi leadership felt that these hostages could be used to improve their leverage against the Allies. They sought to transport 7,500 exchange Jews from Bergen-Belsen, as the allies neared the camp, moving them to Theresienstadt, but had complications during the transport, resulting in the The Lost Train.

== Notable Exchanges ==
=== Palestine Mandate ===
At the beginning of World War II, there were around 2,000 German Templers in the British Mandate of Palestine, 700 of which were deported to and interred in Australia. The Nazi government sought to use British Nationals from Occupied Poland to free the Templers, including 69 Jews in the original exchange of civilians between 1941 and 1943.

More exchanges would continue after the establishment of Bergen-Belsen concentration camp and reduced requirements for repatriation to Mandatory Palestine, resulting in exchanges now focusing on the exchange Jews. In June 1944, an exchange took place in which 222 Jews from Bergen-Belsen and 61 from the Vittel internment camp and Laufen (Salzach) were brought to Palestine via Turkey. In March 1945, 99 Jews from Bergen-Belsen and 38 from the Ravensbrück concentration camp were brought to Palestine via Sweden as part of an exchange program.

=== Kastner train ===
In 1944, negotiations between the Hungarian Jewish Aid and Rescue Committee and the Nazi S.S. resulted in a unique agreement to deport local Jews to Spain and Switzerland rather than send them to the camps. Rezső Kasztner, the president of this committee, actively negotiated with Adolf Eichmann, until the terms of what would be known as the Kastner train were agreed upon.

They reached an agreement that some 1,685 Jews would be spared for a price of $1,000 per head, and that the train carrying these Jews would relocate them to Spain and Switzerland. While many seats were reserved for wealthy Jews who could afford the price, the committee selected seats for the majority. Kasztner himself played a key role in this selection process, choosing rabbis, professors, opera singers, journalists, Zionist leaders, but also nurses and farmers, 252 children, and 388 Jews from his hometown, including his family and many relatives.

Eichmann, however, would break the original agreement and send these Jews to the Bergen-Belsen concentration camp as hostages. Figures like Recha Sternbuch, who had been offering a chance for a trials for Nazi camp guards in exchange for hostages from camps like Ravensbrück, successfully earned the release of nearly all the prisoners. The Nazis chose to hold onto 17 self-proclaimed Romanian Jews, as a punitive measure against the new Romanian government following the 1944 coup.

== See also ==
- Haavara Agreement
- Feldscher Affair(de)
