= Marianne Franken =

Dutch artist (1884–1945)

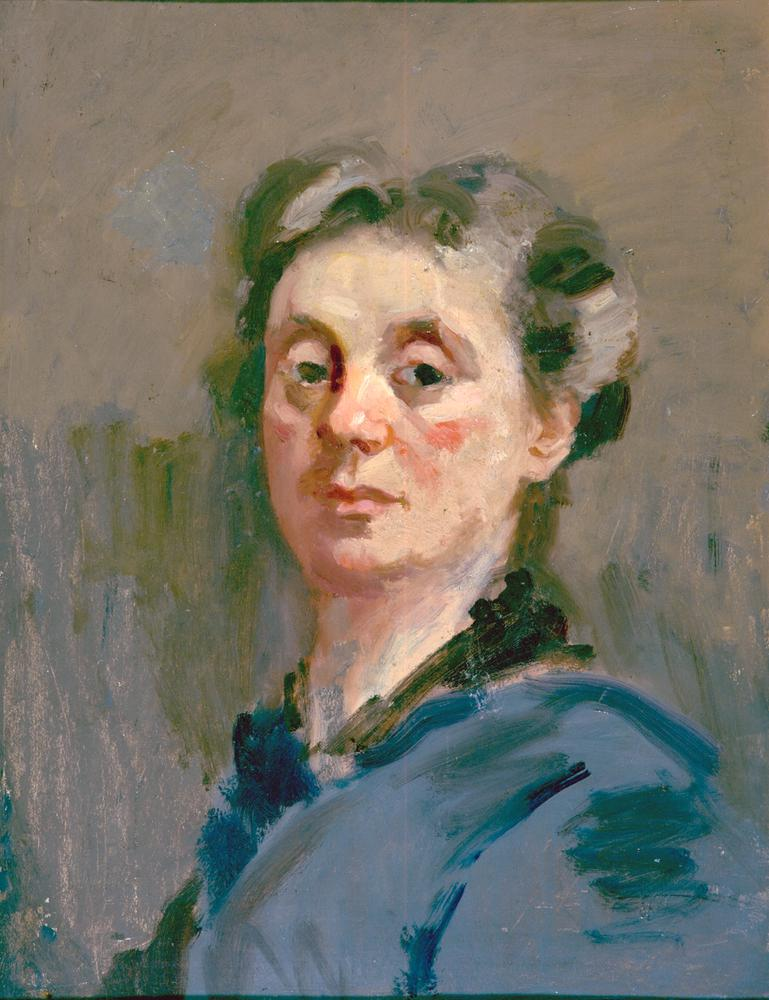
- self portrait
- Born: 11 March 1884; Amsterdam, Netherlands
- Died: 4 April 1945 (aged 61); Bergen-Belsen concentration camp, Nazi Germany
- Known for: Painting

Marianne Franken (11 March 1884 – 4 April 1945) was a Dutch painter.

== Biography ==
Franken was born on 11 March 1884 in Amsterdam. She studied at the Internationaal schildersatelier (Amsterdam) (International painting studio). Franken was a member of, and exhibited with, the Kunstenaarsvereniging Sint Lucas and Arti et Amicitiae. She also exhibited with the Amsterdamse Joffers. Her subjects included still lifes, portraits (particularly of children), and genre scenes from her Jewish neighborhood near the Prinseneiland river in Amsterdam.

Her work was included in the 1939 exhibition and sale Onze Kunst van Heden (Our Art of Today) at the Rijksmuseum in Amsterdam.

Franken died on 4 April 1945 in the Bergen-Belsen concentration camp, Germany.
