= Paolo Maurensig =

Italian novelist (1943–2021)

- Born: 26 March 1943; Gorizia, Italy
- Died: 29 May 2021 (aged 78)

Paolo Maurensig (26 March 1943 – 29 May 2021) was an Italian novelist, best known for his book Canone inverso (1996), a complex tale of a violin and its owners.

== Biography ==
Maurensig was born in Gorizia, northern Italy. His mother was a seamstress, and his father sold pastries.

Before becoming a novelist, he worked in a variety of occupations, including as a restorer of antique musical instruments. His first book, La variante di Lüneburg (The Lüneburg Variation), was published after he had turned 50. His second book was Canone inverso. His latest novel available in English translation is A Devil Comes to Town (2019), a literary parable on narcissism and vainglory, critical of the realities of publishing.

Of Canone inverso, the New York Times Book Review said in 1999 that Maurensig's writing, especially the interlocking narratives, recalled German Romantic writers such as E. T. A. Hoffmann and Joseph von Eichendorff, and also Isak Dinesen. Reviewer Jonathan Keates said, "The mournful beauty of this sparely proportioned, soberly recounted story owes much to the sense Maurensig subtly imparts that Jeno's loneliness is a species of infection communicating itself to every other character in the book. Drawing on the artistic techniques of both the 18th and the 19th centuries, he pronounces a gloomy verdict on the various types of human alienation created by the 20th." NPR said that the book had developed a "cult following." The novel was made into a film in 1999 directed by Ricky Tognazzi starring Hans Matheson and Mélanie Thierry, and with an award-winning score by Ennio Morricone.

For A Devil Comes to Town, reviewer Alex Preston wrote in the Observer "Paolo Maurensig’s A Devil Comes to Town (World Editions, April) blew my mind – think Yorgos Lanthimos directing The Master and Margarita. Translated by Anne Milano Appel, it’s a bizarre slice of Alpine magic realism that deserves to be everywhere next year."

== Death ==
Maurensig died on 29 May 2021, aged 78.

== Works ==
- Il gioco degli dèi (Game of the Gods, 2021)
- Il diavolo nel cassetto (A Devil Comes to Town, 2019)
- La variante di Lüneburg (The Lüneburg Variation, 1993)
- Canone inverso (Canone Inverso, 1996)
- L'ombra e la meridiana (1997)
- Venere lesa (1998)
- Gianni Borta. Gesto, natura, azione (1998)
- L'uomo scarlatto (2001)
- Polietica. Una promessa (with Riccardo Illy, 2003)
- Il guardiano dei sogni (2003)
- Vukovlad – Il signore dei lupi (2006)
- Gli amanti fiamminghi (2008)
- Theory of shadows a novel (2018)
