= Ben Shephard (historian) =

English historian, author, and television producer (1948–2017)

Ben Shephard (1948–2017) was an English historian, author, and television producer. He was educated at Diocesan College, Cape Town, and Westminster School. He graduated in history from Oxford University and made many historical documentaries for the BBC and Channel 4, including producer of The World at War and The Nuclear Age. He died on 25 October 2017 at the age of 69.

== Bibliography ==
- A War of Nerves: Soldiers and Psychiatrists, 1914—1994, Jonathan Cape, London
- After Daybreak: The Liberation of Belsen, 1945, Pimlico, London, 2005, ISBN 978-1-84413-540-0
- The Long Road Home: The Aftermath of the Second World War, Penguin Random House, 2012 ISBN 978-1-40003-350-8
