= List of London medical students who assisted at Belsen =

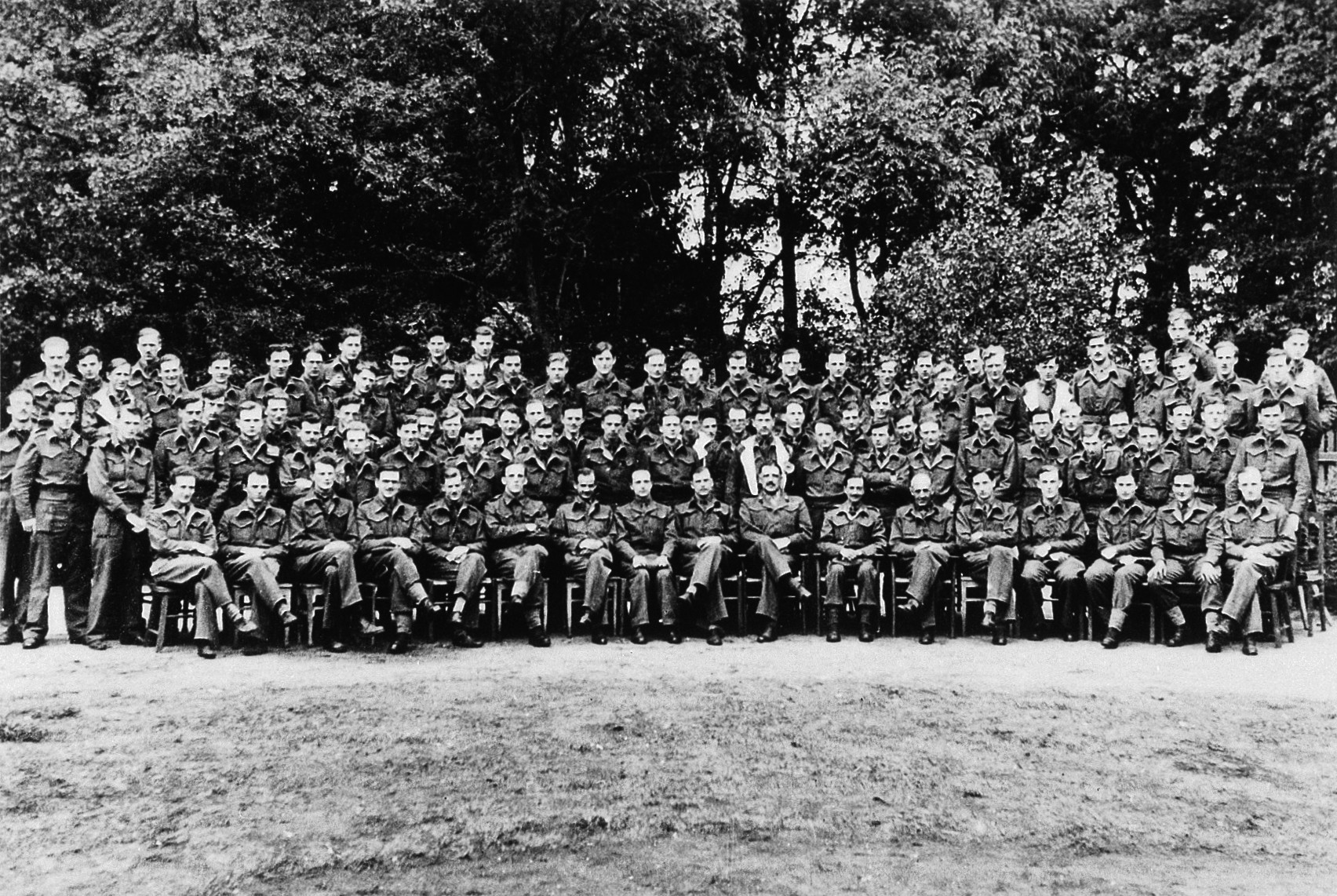
Group photo of London Medical students who went to Belsen

This is a list of London medical students who assisted at Bergen-Belsen concentration camp after its liberation at the end of the Second World War. There were 96 in total. Most of the students were in their penultimate year of medical education and were recruited from nine medical schools in London.

They were a feature of a BBC Open Space programme in 1984. Michael Hargrave recorded some of the events in his memoir Bergen-Belsen 1945: A Medical Student's Journal.

== Guy's Hospital ==
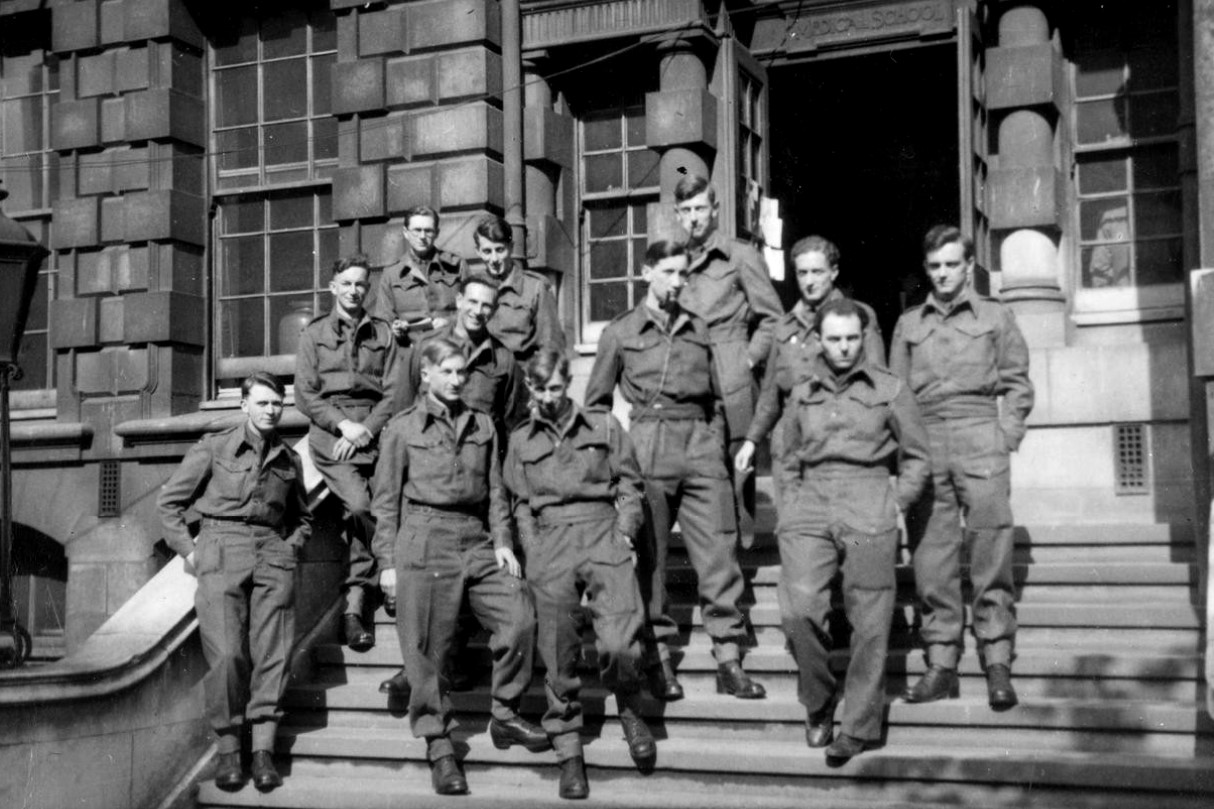
Guy's Hospital medical students who went to Belsen. From left to right: D. Davies, D. Strange, J. S. Jones, D. Rahilly, D. Westbury, M. E. Davys, D. S. Hurwood, D. H. Forsdick, J. V. Kilby, J. E. Mandel, J. L. Hayward and J. A. Turner.

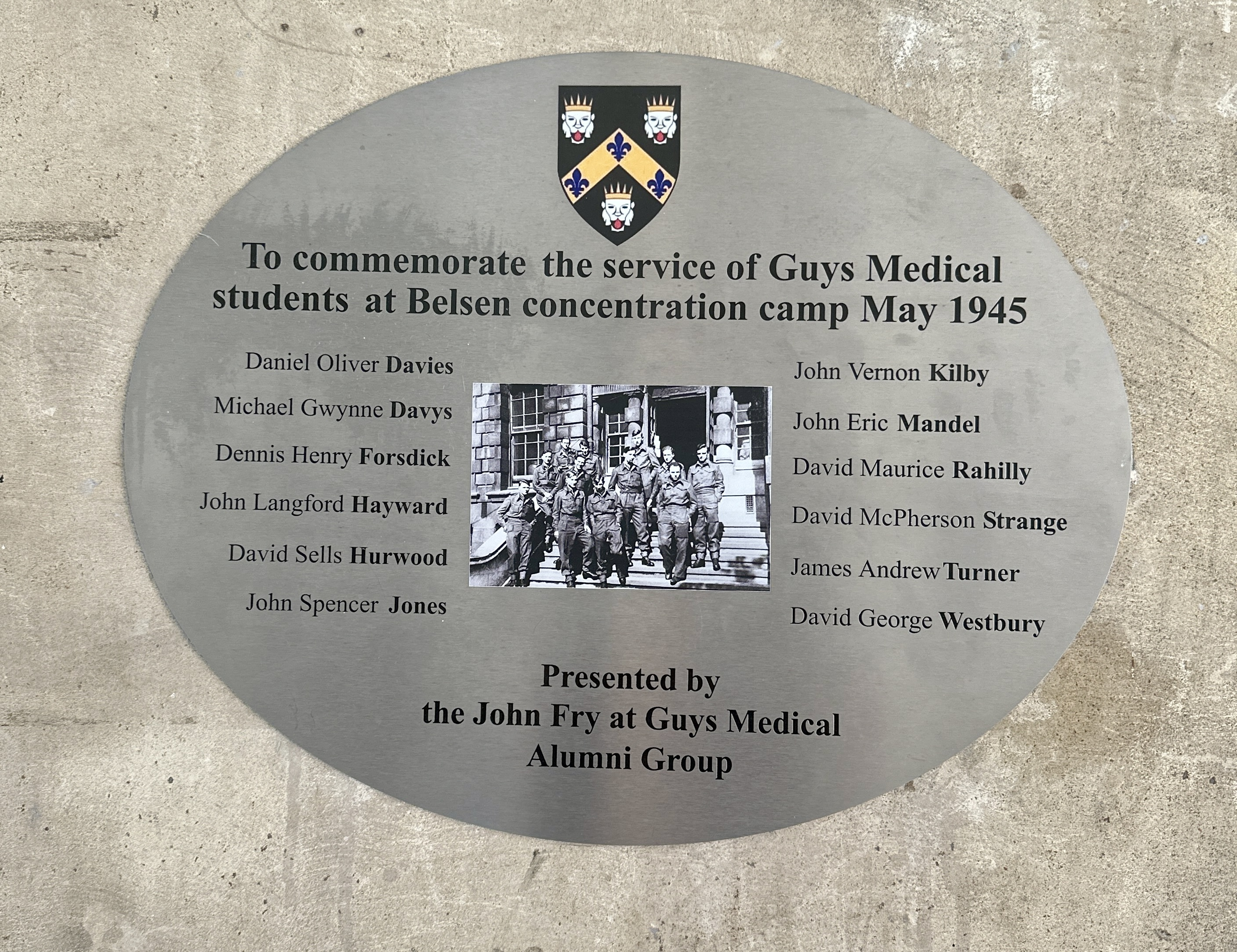
Plaque in memory of the London medical students from Guy's

Name	Birth/death	Comments	reference
Daniel Oliver Davies, also known as Dan Davies	Died 2 March 1977 (age 52)	Became a general practitioner who co-founded a health centre in Whitstable, established a GP course in Canterbury, was secretary of the East Kent Division of the British Medical Association and served with the Zambia Flying Doctor Service.	
Michael Gwynne Douglas Davys	1922 – 12 June 2002	Became a psychiatrist in Harrow on the Hill, who specialised in depression in children.	
Dennis Henry Forsdick	1924 – 9 December 2016 (age 92)	Became a general practitioner at the Friarsgate Medical Centre.	
John Langford Hayward	26 April 1923 – 24 February 2013	Became a breast surgeon who researched treatment for advanced breast cancer.	
David Sells Hurwood	1924 – 22 May 2005	Contracted tuberculosis at Belsen. Later, became a general practitioner in Syston and was a founder member of the Royal College of General Practitioners.	
John Spencer Jones	1924 – 11 March 2007	Became a chest physician.	
John Vernon Kilby		Became a GP after a starting a career in anaesthetics.	
John Eric Mandel			
James Andrew Turner			
David Maurice Rahilly	Born 1922	Became a general practitioner in Suffolk	
David McPherson Strange			
David George Arthur Westbury	12 September 1923 – 7 June 1983 (age 59)	Became a forensic psychiatrist at Winterton Hospital.	

== King's College Hospital ==
Name	Birth/death	Comments	reference
Michael James Forth			
James Learmonth Gowans	7 May 1924 – 1 April 2020	Later specialized in immunology and became professor of experimental pathology at Oxford. He also pursued a research career at the Medical Research Council and showed that lymphocytes play an important role in transplant rejection.	
Alan John Kenny (A. J. Kenny)			
Norman Lees		In September 1948 he married Pamela Fawcus and joined a general practice (with Dr Rhoades Buckton) in Wymondham, Norfolk, in 1950.	
Bernard William Meade			
Thomas Pimblett		Contracted typhus at Belsen which delayed his medical training by a year.	
John Towers		Became a RMO at the Royal West Sussex Hospital in 1946, followed by a psychiatrist at Graylingwell in 1950, where he completed his thesis on temporal lobe epilepsy and mental illness, and was then appointed consultant psychiatrist in 1955. He developed a scheme for community care of the elderly and promoted co-ordination with social services.	
Ian Clifford Leonard White	1921-2004	Became a psychiatrist, working first in the UK, then emigrated to Adelaide, Australia in 1964 where he worked as a psychiatrist, then child psychiatrist in the public health system, until retirement.	<family supplied information>
Gwyn Williams			
Sidney Clifford Brookfield Yorke	1922–2007	Became a psychiatrist at the Maudsley Hospital and later took over from Anna Freud at the Hampstead Clinic.	

== Middlesex Hospital ==
Colonel E.E. Vella reported that there were eight students from Middlesex Hospital:

Name	Birth/death	Comments	reference
Gordon Dutton		Became a psychiatrist.	
Philip David Alexander Kent	Born 1922	Became a psychiatrist. His journal is held at the National Archives.	
Humphrey Bohun Kidd		His journal is held at the National Archives.	
John Goff Kilner		Became a general practitioner in Epsom.	
Gerald Raperport		His account of his experience at Belsen was published in 1945 edition of The Middlesex Hospital Journal.	
Peter Watts Rowsell			
David Andrew Thomas Tizard	Born 1922	Became a general practitioner in London. Son of Sir Henry Tizard.	
George Gordon Walker			

== St Bartholomew's Hospital ==
In 1981, in parliament, Eldon Griffiths calculated that nine students volunteered from St Bartholomew's Hospital.

Name	Birth/death	Comments	reference
David Cordley Bradford	1922–2002	Became a general practitioner and founded the first purpose built surgery in Gloucestershire.	
Leslie William Clarke			
John Roger Bertram Dixey			
Andrew Ernest Dossetor	Died 5 December 2013	Due to typhus, his return home from Belsen was delayed. He later became a general practitioner and his case was once discussed in the House of Commons.	
Ian McArthur Jackson			
Edward Deryk Marsh			
Ian Reginald Davidson Proctor			
Laurence Geoffrey Rowland Wand	(1924 – 23 November 2012)	Also known as Laurie. After the war was colonel in the Territorial Army. Retired from general practice in 1990.	

== St Mary's Hospital ==
Students from St Mary's Hospital Medical School included:

Name	Birth/death	Comments	reference
Robert Armatage			
Thomas Colin Lyall Brown			
John Hankinson	10 March 1919 Died 9 March 2009	Prof of Neurosurgery, Newcastle upon Tyne	
Thomas Desmond Hawkins	22 May 1923 – 2 January 2015	After the war he undertook specialist training in radiology in Oxford and Manchester, was elected a Fellow of the Royal College of Radiologists in 1959 and then moved to Addenbrooke's in 1960. He become a pioneer of interventional neuroradiology and between 1979 and 1984 was the Dean of Cambridge University's school of clinical medicine.	
Peter Derek Campbell Jackson			
Gerald Woolf Korn			
Andrew B. Matthews	Died 1995		
John McLuskie			
Alan Vandyke Price		Later married Pamela Vandyke Price.	
Gordon Caton Thick			
Roger W. Watson			
John Leslie Clarence Whitcome			

== St Thomas' Hospital ==
Twelve students went from St Thomas' Medical School. included:

Name	Birth/death	Comments	reference
Eddie Boyd	died 13 February 2013	Caught typhus at Belsen, returned to England and recovered after six months. Retired from medicine at age 52 and wrote popular romance novels under the pseudonym Esther Boyd.	
Alan David Rowan MacAuslan	1921 – 25 May 2018	In 2005, at the age of 83, his story was reported in the BBC News.	
Michael Harold Farnham Coigley		Upon return in 1946, with John Stephenson, wrote a paper on treating starvation with protein hydrolysate. He later became a general practitioner.	
Keith Maxwell Fergusson			
Peter J. Horsey	1924–2015	Became a consultant anaesthetist at Southampton.	
Alex Paton	2 March 1924 – 12 September 2015	Became a gastroenterologist, writer and postgraduate dean for North-West London hospitals. He specialised in alcohol misuse and became the first chairman of the medical committee of Alcohol Concern. His book, ABC of Alcohol, went through four editions.	
John Anthony Reynolds			
John Stephenson		Upon return in 1946, with Coigley, wrote a paper on treating starvation with protein hydrolysate.	
Peter Barr Taylor		Previously P. B. Taylor, he later appears in the Medical Register as Peter Barr-Taylor. In 1973 he was promoted from flight lieutenant to squadron leader.	
Arthur Thompson Cook		Became a British Army physician.	
Claude Dempster	1924 – 6 March 2001	Became a pathologist at the King Edward VII Hospital, Windsor.	
Ian Whimster	3 September 1923 – 18 January 1979	Gained international recognition for his study of comparative anatomy and experiments with reptiles, particularly observing their colour patterns in relation to their nerve supply. He defined keratoacanthoma, the distinction between pemphigus and pemphigoid and made descriptions of melanocytes and melanoma. He died in a road traffic accident at the age of 55.	

== The London Hospital ==
One account states there were twelve students from the London Hospital.

Name	Birth/death	Comments	reference
Thomas Chometon Gibson	30 April 1921 – 2 May 2020	Reported on his frustrations at treating inmates at Belsen with lack of resources. Became professor of medicine at Robert Larner College of Medicine.	
John Arthur Harland Hancock	1923 – 7 June 1974	Contracted typhus in Belsen. Later, he became a dermatologist and then a venereologist and edited the British Journal of Venereal Diseases. He wrote on non-gonococcal urethritis and reactive arthritis, then known as Reiter's disease.	
Francis Herbert William Johnson			
Charles Alexander Kyndt	28 August 1921 - 8 November 1987	According to his journal entry, he was assigned hut No. 207 containing 700 or more women. He became a general practitioner in East London and honorary consultant dermatologist at the Royal London Hospital.	
James Horace Sidney Morgan			
Richard David Pearce			
David Robertson Smith		Became a haematologist Royal Berkshire Hospital.	
P. W. G. Tasker	19 May 1924 – 2 March 1960	Assisted as a pilot during the Malayan Emergency and performed some of the earliest studies of the causes of anaemia using radioactive tracer techniques. He later became a general practitioner.	
John Brian Walker	1924 – 15 October 2014	Became an eye surgeon and then a general practitioner. Later became known for his skill in sailing with the Hornet dinghy fleet.	
Eirian (Bill) Williams	7 May 1925 – 1 March 1991	Became a physician at Withybush Hospital, Haverfordwest, and wrote on brucellosis.	

== University College London ==
Those from UCL Medical School included:

Name	Birth/death	Comments	reference
Brian William Barras			
Paul Walter Clements			
Thomas Crisp			
Richard Kingsley Jones			
John Henry Raphael			
Mark J. Raymond			
Douglas Ivor Roberts			
Geoffrey Basil Rooke			
Roger Sheridan			
Roger Silverberg		Also known as Morris Roger Silverberg.	
Philip Metcalfe Yeoman		Became a consultant to the Bath Orthopaedic Hospital and the Royal National Hospital for Rheumatic Diseases.	

== Westminster Hospital ==
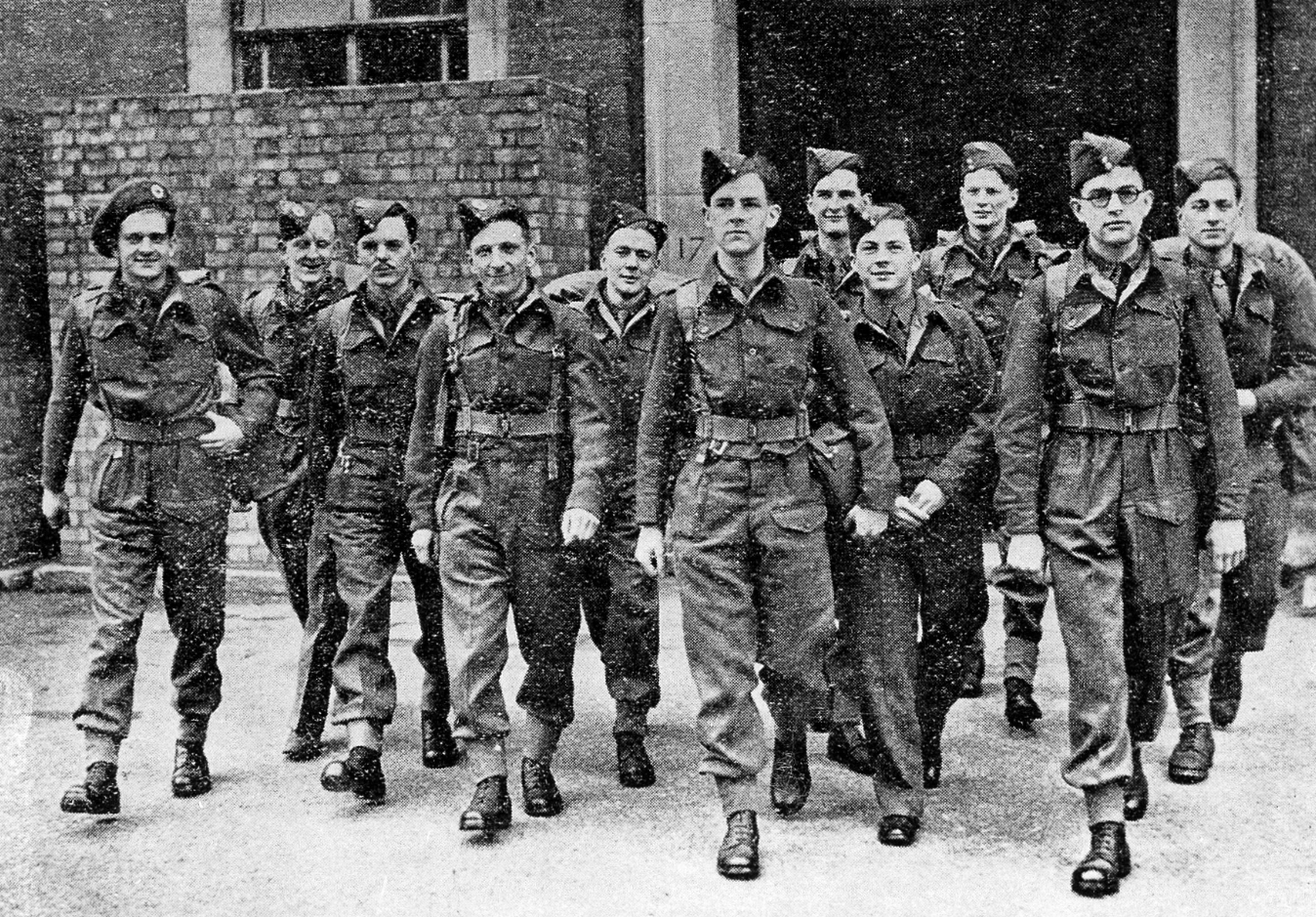
Group of Westminster hospital students who worked at Belsen. Hargrave is second from the right. The other students are G. Woodwark, D. Wells, R. Barton, E. Trimmer, R.E. Citrine, K.C. Easton, A.D. Moore, J.R.E. Jenkins, D.P. Bowles and L.K. Garstin

Westminster Hospital Medical School's tercentenary booklet states that they sent eleven students,

Name	Birth/death	Comments	reference
Russell William Andrew Charles Barton		Became a psychiatrist, who in 1968 wrote a controversial article in Purnell's History of the Second World War based on his experience at Belsen. In 1976 his book titled Institutional Neurosis was published.	
Ronald Eric Citrine	Born 19 May 1919	Registered as a medical practitioner in New Zealand in 1955, and lived at Paihia.	
Kenneth Charles Easton	1924 – 8 February 2001	Pusued a career focussed around the development of prehospital care and emergency medicine.	
Lionel Kentish Garstin	1923-2010		
Andrew David Moore			
Eric James Trimmer		Also known as Harry.	
Derek Geoffrey Wells			
George Millington Woodwark	1923 – 4 June 2012	Became a cardiologist who moved to Vancouver Island.	
John Richard Everett Jenkins		Known as 'Dick' Everett Jenkins, co-authored Practical Anaesthesia for Lung Surgery (1967)	
David Phillip Bowles			
Michael Hargrave	8 December 1923 – 25 July 1974	Became a general practitioner in Wootton Bassett, Wiltshire. His memoirs, written for his mother, were used by historian Ben Shephard in his 2005 book After Daybreak: The Liberation of Belsen, 1945, and were later published by Imperial College Press in 2014, in a book titled Bergen-Belsen 1945: A Medical Student's Journal.	

== See also ==
- Charles Enrique Dent
- Janet Vaughan
- Rosalind Pitt-Rivers
