= John Hancock (venereologist) =

British venereologist

John Arthur Harland Hancock
- Born: 1923
- Died: 7 June 1974 (aged 50–51)
- Education: The London Hospital
- Known for: London medical students at Belsen; British Journal of Venereal Diseases
- Medical career
- Profession: Physician
- Field: Dermatology; Sexually transmitted diseases
- Research: Dermatology; Reactive arthritis

John Arthur Harland Hancock (1923 – 7 June 1974) was a British venereologist and editor of the British Journal of Venereal Diseases who wrote on non-gonococcal urethritis and reactive arthritis, what was known as Reiter's disease at the time. In 1945, while studying medicine at the London Hospital, he was one of the voluntary students sent to Belsen to assist nutritionist Arnold Peter Meiklejohn in feeding the starving inmates. There, he became unwell with typhus and was treated back at The London by Lord Evans.

Following his recovery, he completed his medical studies and gained his medical degree in 1948. Subsequently, he began a career in dermatology, first as a house officer to the dermatology department and then with his National Service in the Royal Army Medical Corps, becoming officer-in-charge of the dermatology department at the Cambridge Military Hospital, Aldershot and later in a post of Acting Adviser in dermatology to the War Office. Later, he pursued a career in venereology.

== Early life ==
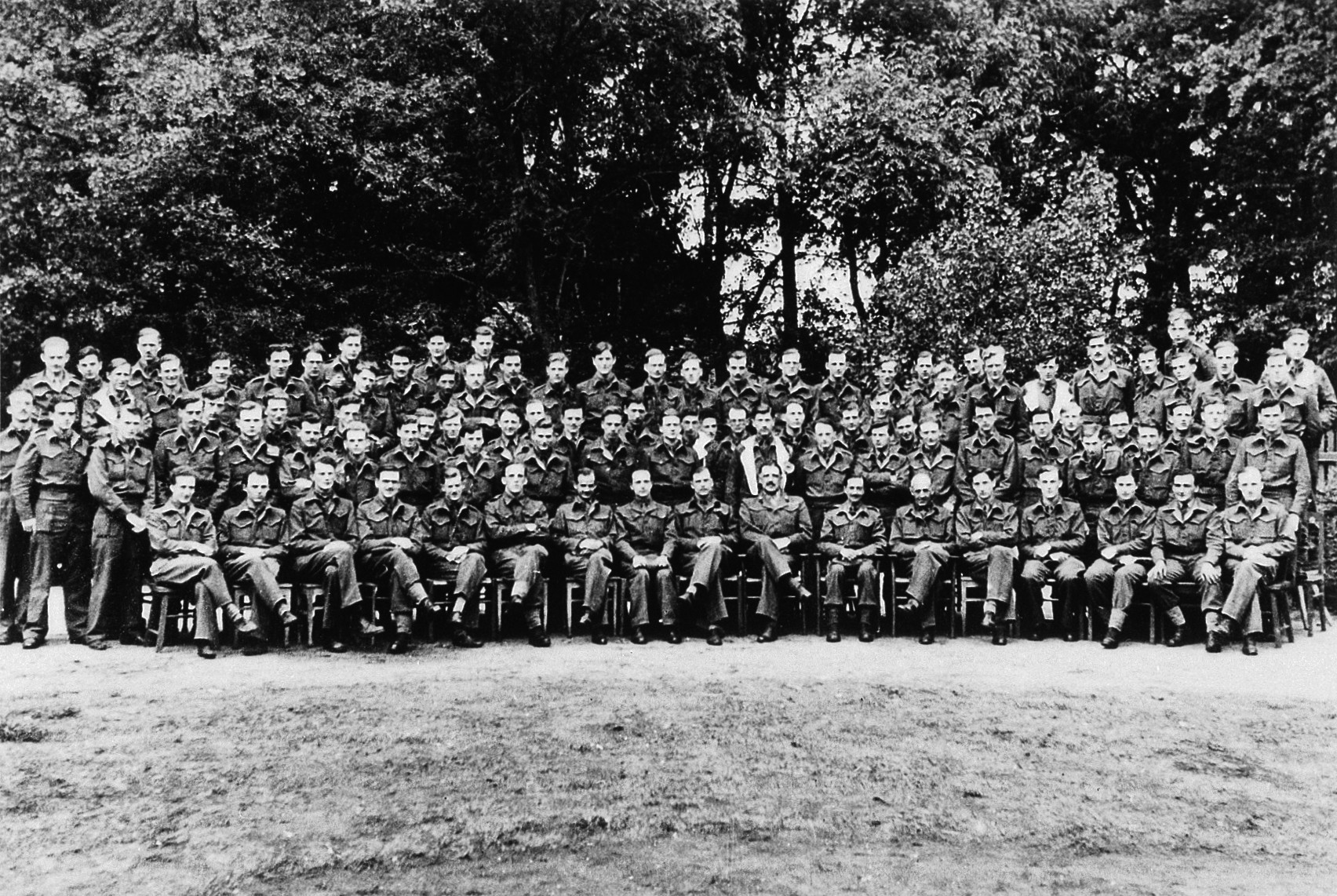
Group photo of London Medical students who went to Belsen

John Hancock was born in 1923. In 1945, while studying medicine at the London Hospital, he was one of the voluntary students sent to Belsen to assist nutritionist Arnold Peter Meiklejohn in feeding the starving inmates. Here, he became unwell with typhus and was treated back at the London Hospital by Lord Evans.

== Career ==
Following this interruption in his medical studies, Hancock gained his medical degree in 1948 and began a career in dermatology, first as a house officer to the dermatology department and then with his National Service in the Royal Army Medical Corps, becoming officer-in-charge of the dermatology department at the Cambridge Military Hospital, Aldershot and later in a post of Acting Adviser in dermatology to the War Office.

Later, he took up a career in venereal disease. In June 1957, he spent one year as Fellow in Medicine at the Syphilis Clinic and Department of Chronic Diseases at the Johns Hopkins Hospital, Baltimore. When he returned to the London Hospital as a senior registrar, he was appointed Assistant Physician to the Medical Research Council Working Party on non-gonococcal urethritis. From 1959 to 1962 he was Acting Part-time Consultant to the Metropolitan Hospital. In his paper "Surface Manifestations of Reiter's Disease in the Male", British Journal of Venereal Diseases (BJVD) (1960), he noted that 26% of the men he assessed with the disease had ring shaped lesions on their penis.

Between 1968 and 1972 he became editor of the BJVD. In addition to writing on "Reiter's disease" (now known as reactive arthritis), he wrote on non-gonococcal urethritis, reporting in 1959, 4.7% incidence of urethral stricture, diagnosed by urethroscopy, in the notes of 276 men with non-gonococcal urethritis.

== Death ==
Hancock died in 1974, at the age of 51.

== Selected publications ==
- "Surface Manifestations of Reiter's Disease in the Male", British Journal of Venereal Disease, Vol. XXXVI, No. 1 (March 1960).
- Hancock, JA (1965). "Reiter's disease". Practitioner. 195: 605–12. PMID 5847571.
- "Syphilis. A Synopsis. VENEREAL DISEASES PROGRAM OF THE NATIONAL COMMUNICABLE DISEASE CENTER. U.S. Department of Health Education and Welfare". Br J Vener Dis. 45 (3): 255. 1969. PMC 1047987.
- Iveson, JM; Nanda, BS; Hancock, JA; Pownall, PJ; Wright, V (1975). "Reiter's disease in three boys". Ann Rheum Dis. 34: 364–8. doi:10.1136/ard.34.4.364. PMC 1006429. PMID 1103755.

== See also ==
- List of London medical students who assisted at Belsen
