= David Westbury =

English physician

- Born: David George Arthur Westbury; 12 September 1923; Rugby, Warwickshire, England
- Died: 7 June 1983 (aged 59); London, England
- Education: Guy's Hospital
- Medical career
- Profession: Physician
- Sub-specialties: Forensic psychiatry

David George Arthur Westbury (12 September 1923 – 7 June 1983) was an English physician. He was described in his obituary by the Royal College of Psychiatrists as a "founding father of British forensic psychiatry". In 1945, while studying medicine at Guy's Hospital, he assisted at Bergen-Belsen concentration camp as a voluntary medical student.

He spent his career in posts at St Audry's Hospital, Melton, Suffolk and then at Hellesdon Hospital, Norwich. After gaining the diploma in psychiatry he was elected member of the Royal College of Psychiatrists, and became a fellow soon after. He became a member of the Prison Medical Services in 1964, and was appointed medical officer at HM Prison Durham until 1967, when he joined the Home Office as consultant forensic psychiatrist. In this position, he established the academic discipline of forensic psychiatry in the northern region, and for teenage male offenders, created the forensic psychiatry centre at the Winterton Hospital, Sedgefield. He was a medical member of the Mental Health Review Tribunal and continued to teach his specialty for several years.

After his death following a long illness, the David Westbury Centre, an establishment he founded, was named in his honour.

== Early life ==
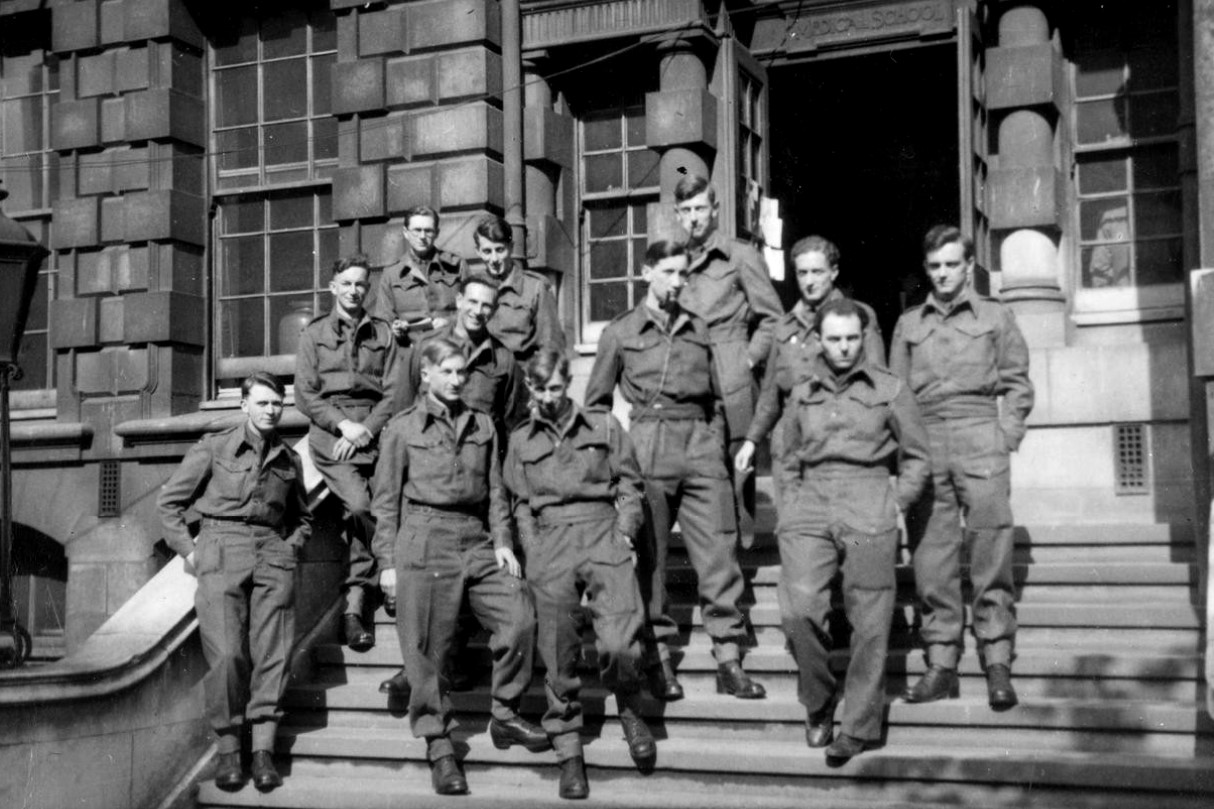
Guy's Hospital medical students who went to Belsen. Pictured from left to right: D. Davies, D. Strange, J. S. Jones, D. Rahilly, D. Westbury, M. E. Davys, D. S. Hurwood, D. H. Forsdick, J. V. Kilby, J. E. Mandel, J. L. Hayward and J. A. Turner.

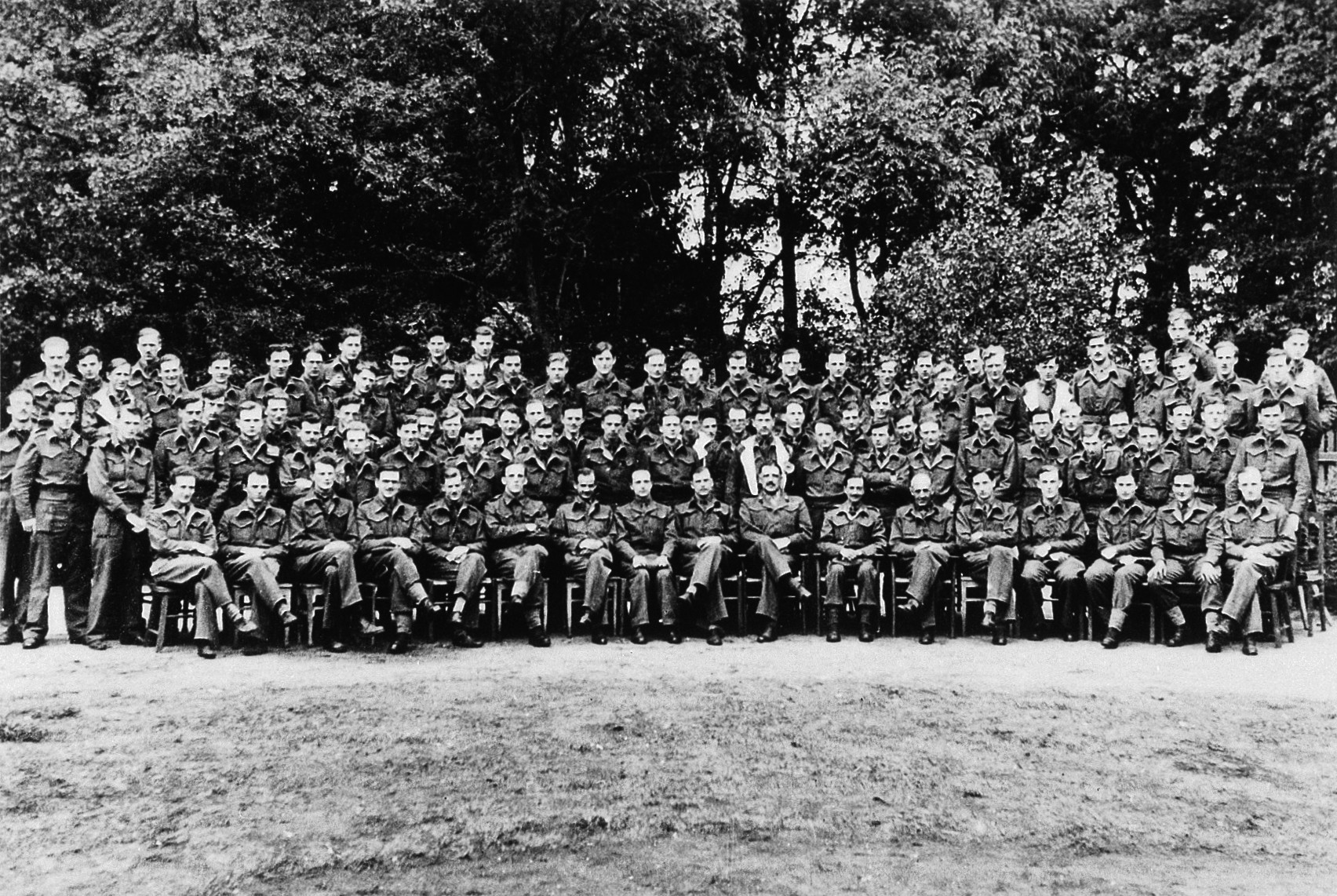
Group photo of London Medical students who went to Belsen

David Westbury was born on 12 September 1923 in Rugby, Warwickshire, and educated at Rugby School.

He studied medicine at Guy's Hospital in London, and in 1945 was one of the London medical students who assisted at Bergen-Belsen concentration camp. He qualified MBBS in 1947.

== Career ==
He was appointed first to St Audry's Hospital, Melton, Suffolk and then to Hellesdon Hospital, Norwich. In 1959, he gained the diploma in psychiatry and in 1971 he was elected to the foundation membership of the Royal College of Psychiatrists, and became a fellow in 1976. As a member of the Prison Medical Services from 1964, he was appointed medical officer at HM Prison Durham until 1967, when he joined the Home Office as consultant forensic psychiatrist. In this post, he was credited with establishing the academic discipline of forensic psychiatry in the northern region, and for teenage male offenders, created the forensic psychiatry centre at the Winterton Hospital, Sedgefield. He was a medical member of the Mental Health Review Tribunal and continued to teach his specialty for several years.

In 1968, he was one of two psychiatrists called into the trial of Mary Bell.

== Death and legacy ==
In 1973, Westbury became severely ill with a heart condition. Disabled by his condition, he took early retirement in 1981. He died in London on 7 June 1983. He received an obituary in the journal of the Royal College of Psychiatrists who described him as a "founding father of British forensic psychiatry".

The David Westbury Centre, a forensic psychiatry unit specialising in the treatment of adolescents (aged 12–16 years) who have psychological and maladaptive behaviour problems, an establishment he founded, is named in his honour.

== Selected publications ==
- "Forensic Psychiatry in Britain: Its Potentials". International Journal of Offender Therapy and Comparative Criminology, Vol. 13, Issue 3 (1969), pp. 165–176. doi:10.1177/0306624X6901300306

== See also ==
- List of London medical students who assisted at Belsen
