= John Brian Walker =

- Born: 1924; Catford, London, England
- Died: 14 October 2014 (aged 89–90); Cornwall, England
- Education: New College, Oxford; The London Hospital
- Occupation: general practitioner
- Known for: London medical students at Belsen
- Medical career
- Profession: Physician

John Brian Walker (1924 – 15 October 2014) was a British general practitioner with a prior career in eye surgery. After studying at New College, Oxford and while studying medicine at The London Hospital in 1945, he was one of the London medical students who were sent to Bergen-Belsen concentration camp shortly after its liberation by British troops, to assist in the feeding of the severely malnourished and dying inmates, under the supervision of nutritionist Arnold Peter Meiklejohn. After gaining his medical degree, he was drafted into the army and sent to east Africa, where he became an eye surgeon. Following demobilisation, he returned to London with his wife Mary and took on his father's general practice. Walker was also known for his skill in sailing with the Hornet dinghy fleet throughout the 1950s to 1970s.

== Early life ==
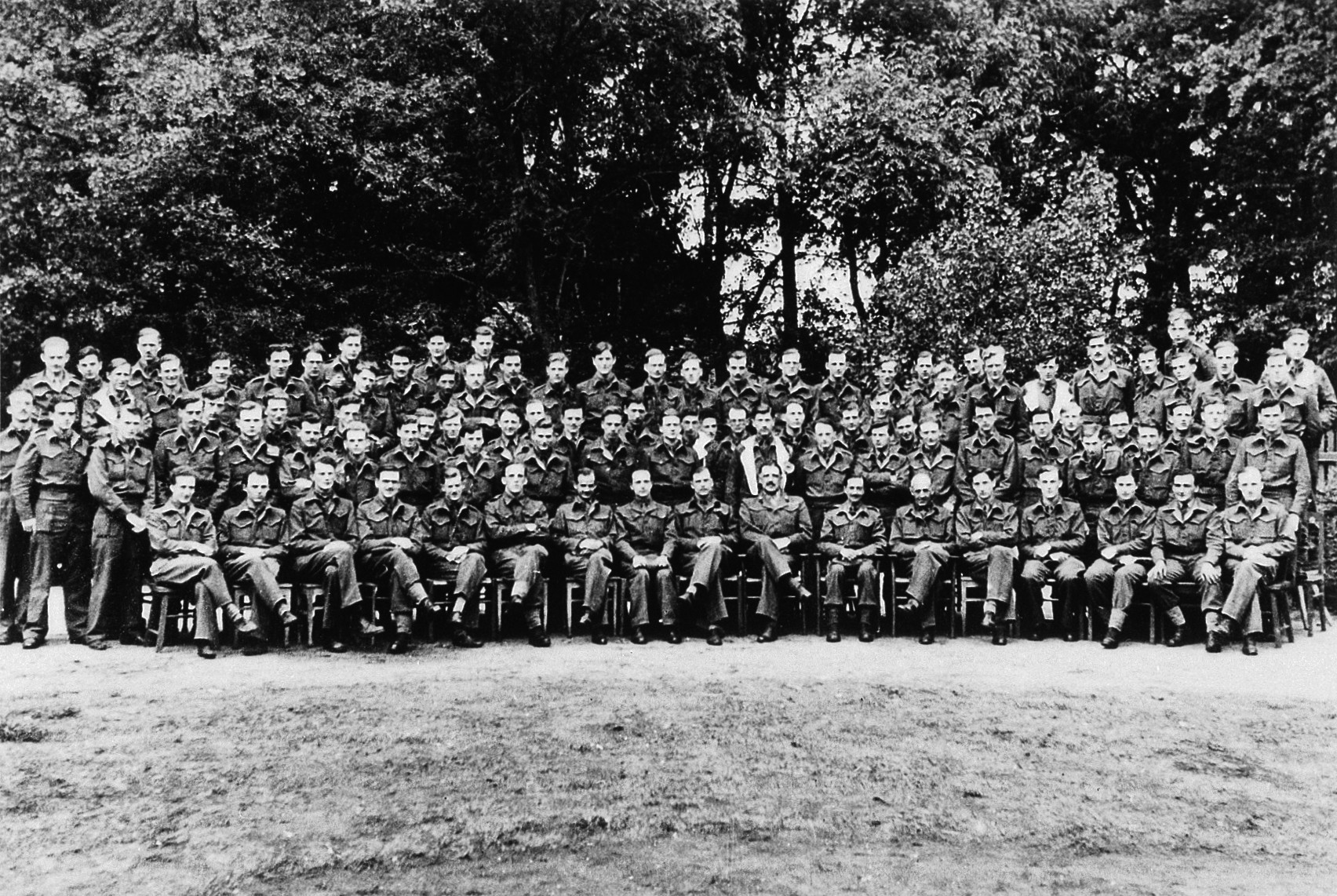
Group photo of London Medical students who went to Belsen

John Brian Walker was born in Catford, London. After studying at New College, Oxford and while studying medicine at The London Hospital in 1945, he was one of the London medical students who were sent to Bergen-Belsen concentration camp shortly after its liberation by British troops, to assist in the feeding of the severely malnourished and dying inmates, under the supervision of nutritionist Arnold Peter Meiklejohn.

After gaining his medical degree, he was drafted into the army and sent to east Africa, where he became an eye surgeon and married Mary, a Royal London Hospital nurse. Following the demobilisation of the British Armed Forces after the Second World War, he returned to London with Mary and ran his father's general practice. They had one son and a daughter.

== Later life ==
Walker was also known for his skill in sailing with the Hornet dinghy fleet throughout the 1950s to 1970s. With Mary, they ran a "cadet week" at Burnham-on-Crouch, Essex, to help young people learn to sail. They later had an Alan Buchanan 44 foot yacht built. It was launched in 1991 and they spent many summers sailing it around the Mediterranean.

== Death ==
On 15 October 2014, he died from congestive cardiac failure at home in Cornwall. Mary had died before him and his son died in 2011. On 1 November 2014, a memorial was held at the Harbour Club in Portscatho, Cornwall. He donated his body to a medical school for the study of anatomy. He was outlived by one daughter, Stefanie.

== See also ==
- List of London medical students who assisted at Belsen
