= Daniel Oliver Davies =

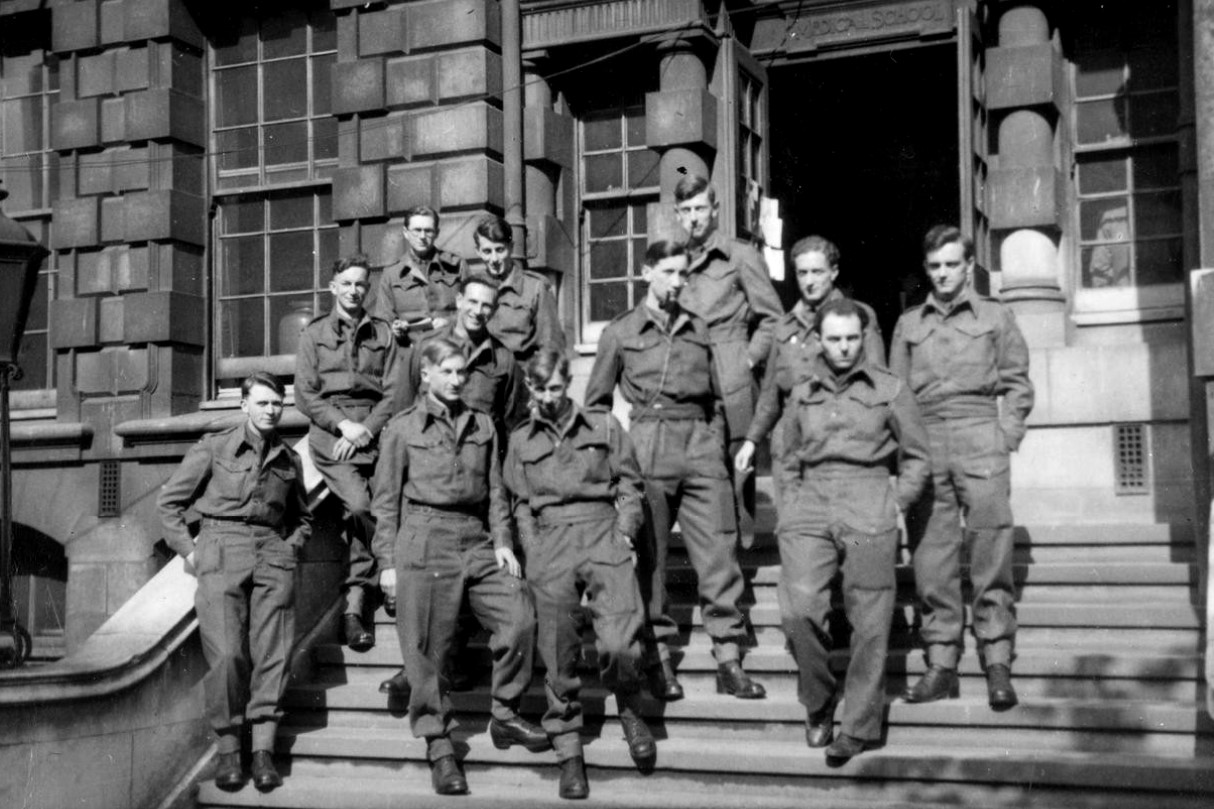
Guy's Hospital medical students who went to Belsen. Pictured from left to right: D. Davies, D. Strange, J. S. Jones, D. Rahilly, D. Westbury, M. E. Davys, D. S. Hurwood, D. H. Forsdick, J. V. Kilby, J. E. Mandel, J. L. Hayward and J. A. Turner.

Daniel Oliver Davies FRCGP (15 October 1920 – 2 March 1977), also known as Dan Davies, was a British general practitioner who co-founded a health centre in Whitstable, established a general practitioner course in Canterbury, was secretary of the East Kent Division of the British Medical Association and served with the Zambia Flying Doctor Service. In 1945, while studying medicine at Guy's Hospital, he assisted at Bergen-Belsen concentration camp as a voluntary medical student.

The annual 'Dan Davies Competition' at the Whitstable Lifeboat Station is held in his memory.

== See also ==
- List of London medical students who assisted at Belsen
