= David Cordley Bradford =

British general practitioner

David Cordley Bradford (1922–2002), was a British general practitioner who founded the first purpose built surgery in Gloucestershire. In 1945, he was one of the volunteer London medical students from St Bartholomew's Hospital sent to assist at Belsen following its liberation by British troops.

== See also ==
- List of London medical students who assisted at Belsen
