= Sidney Clifford Brookfield Yorke =

British psychiatrist (1922–2007)

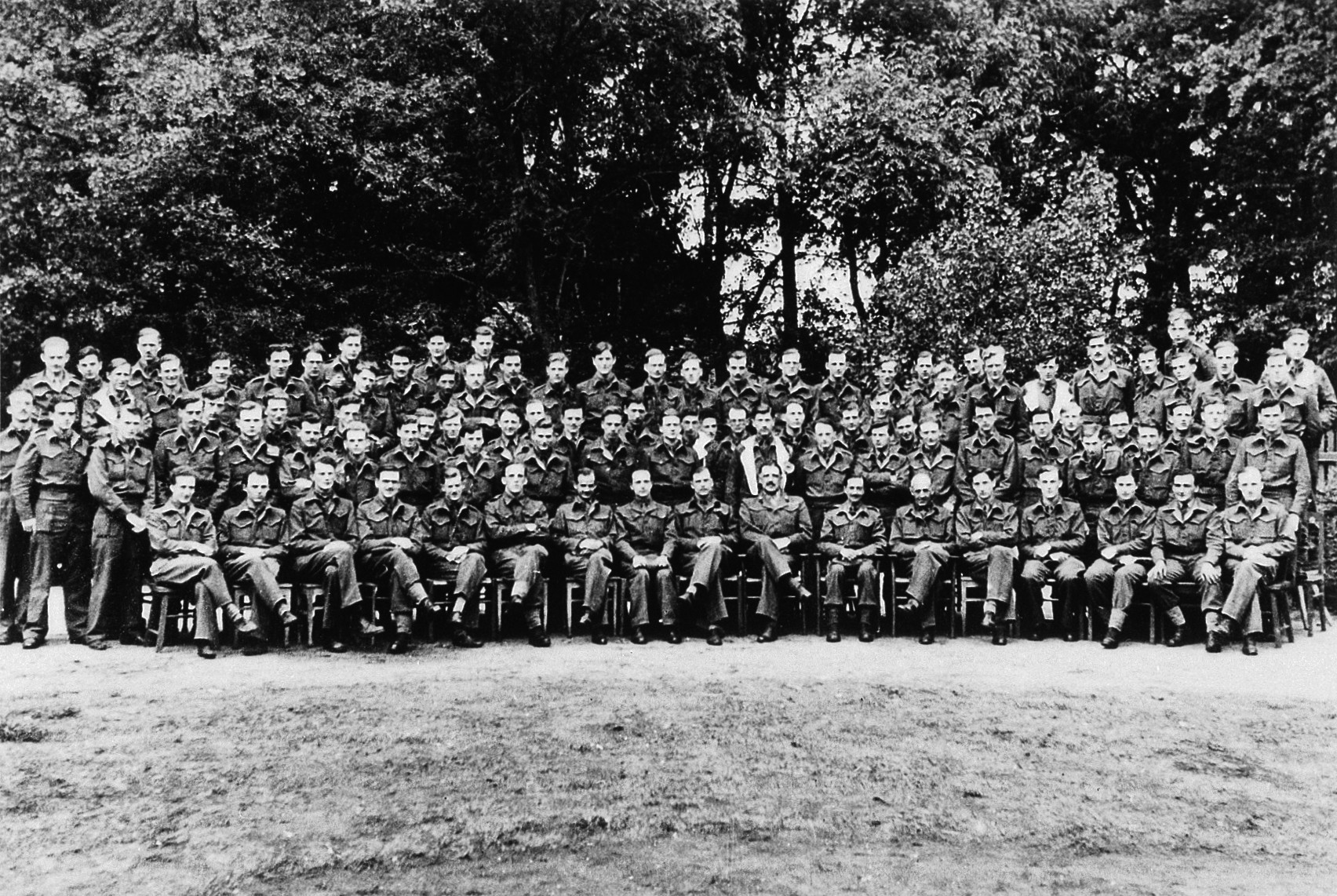
Group photo of London Medical students who went to Belsen

Sidney Clifford Brookfield Yorke (1922–2007), was a British Psychiatrist at the Maudsley Hospital who in 1945 while studying medicine at King's College Hospital, assisted at Bergen-Belsen concentration camp as a voluntary medical student. He took over from Anna Freud at the Hamstead Clinic.

== See also ==
- List of London medical students who assisted at Belsen
