= Alan David Rowan MacAuslan =

British doctor

Alan David Rowan MacAuslan (1921 – 25 May 2018) was a British doctor who in 1945, while studying at St Thomas' Hospital, assisted at Bergen-Belsen concentration camp when he volunteered as a medical student. In 2005, at the age of 83, his story was reported in the BBC News.

== See also ==
- List of London medical students who assisted at Belsen
