= Peter William Gedge Tasker =

Peter William Gedge Tasker (19 May 1924 – 2 March 1960) was a British general practitioner who performed some of the earliest studies of the causes of anaemia using radioactive tracer techniques. During his studies at The London Hospital in 1945, he was one of the London medical students who were sent to Bergen-Belsen concentration camp shortly after its liberation by British troops, to assist in the feeding of the severely malnourished and dying inmates, under the supervision of nutritionist Arnold Peter Meiklejohn. During the Malayan Emergency, he assisted by taking on the role as a pilot.
