= Michael Gwynne Douglas Davys =

British psychiatrist

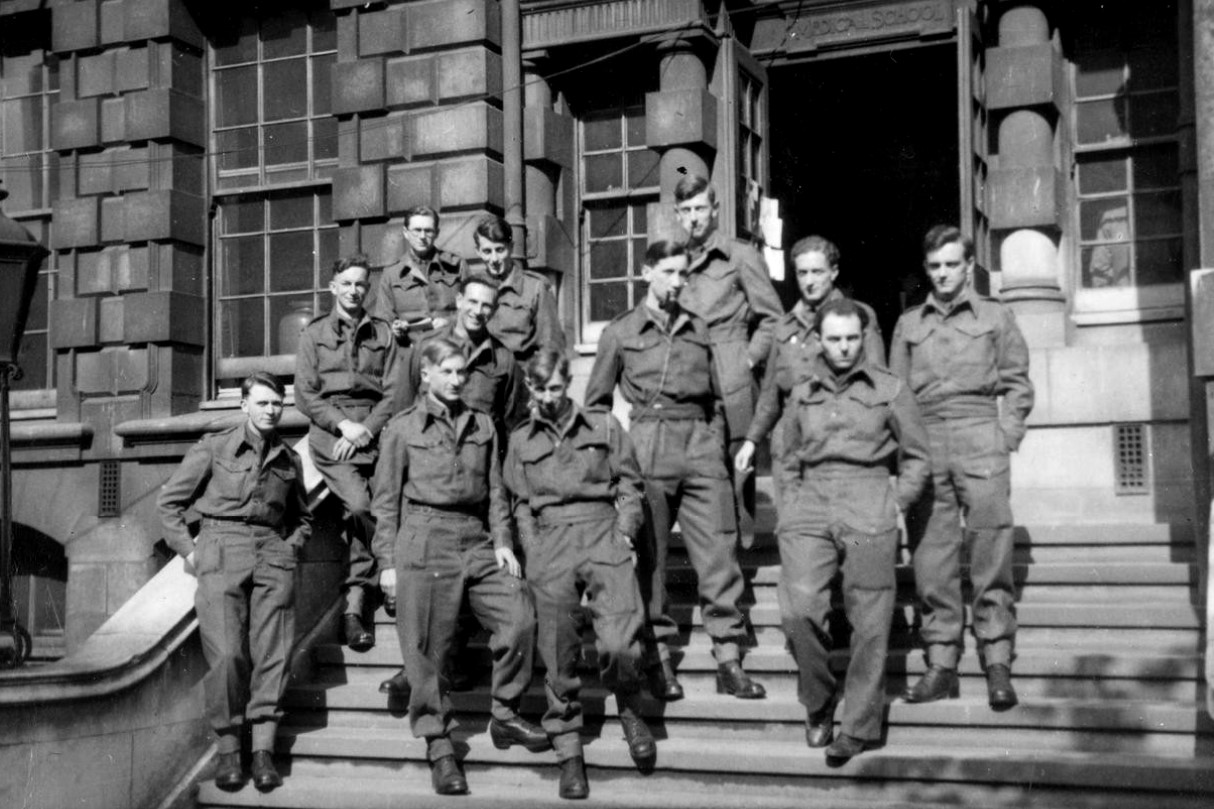
Guy's Hospital medical students who went to Belsen. Pictured from left to right: D. Davies, D. Strange, J. S. Jones, D. Rahilly, D. Westbury, M. E. Davys, D. S. Hurwood, D. H. Forsdick, J. V. Kilby, J. E. Mandel, J. L. Hayward and J. A. Turner.

Michael Gwynne Douglas Davys (1922 – 12 June 2002), was a British psychiatrist in Harrow on the Hill, who specialised in depression in children. In 1945, while studying medicine at Guy's Hospital, he assisted at Bergen-Belsen concentration camp as a voluntary medical student.

== See also ==
- List of London medical students who assisted at Belsen
