= John Langford Hayward =

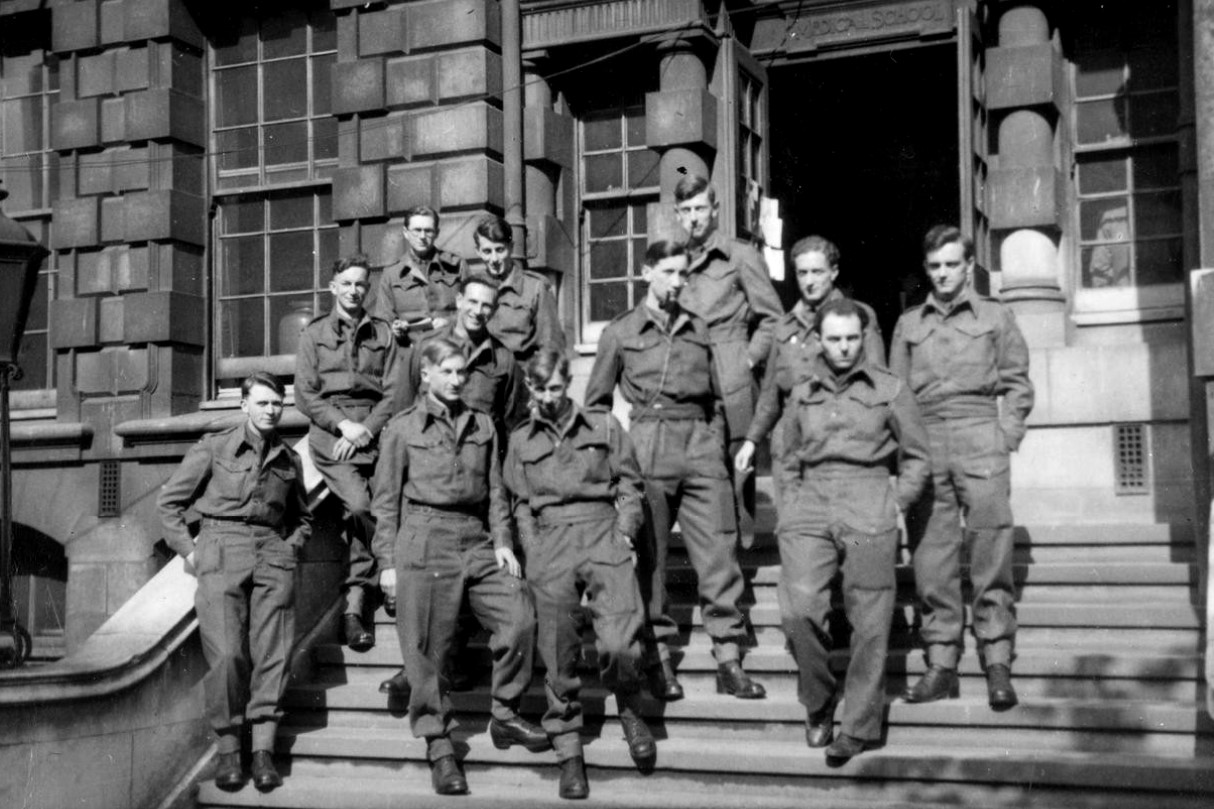
Guy's Hospital medical students who went to Belsen. Pictured from left to right: D. Davies, D. Strange, J. S. Jones, D. Rahilly, D. Westbury, M. E. Davys, D. S. Hurwood, D. H. Forsdick, J. V. Kilby, J. E. Mandel, J. L. Hayward and J. A. Turner.

John Langford Hayward (26 April 1923 – 24 February 2013), was a British breast surgeon who researched treatment for advanced breast cancer. In 1945, while studying medicine at Guy's Hospital, he assisted with the Relief effort at Bergen-Belsen concentration camp as a voluntary medical student. He graduated in 1947.

== See also ==
- List of London medical students who assisted at Belsen
