= Andrew Ernest Dossetor =

British general practitioner

Andrew Ernest Dossetor (died 5 December 2013), was a British general practitioner who was one of the volunteer London medical students from St Bartholomew's Hospital sent to assist at Belsen following its liberation by British troops in 1945. There, he became severely ill with typhus, delaying his return home. His case was discussed many years later in the House of Commons.

== Selected publications ==
- A Report on Otitis Externa. The Journal of Laryngology & Otology, Volume 71, Issue 4 April 1957, pp. 271–275. doi:10.1017/S0022215100051781
- "A General Practice Merit Aware". The Lancet Vol. 279, Issue 7241 (9 June 1962), p. 1238. doi:10.1016/S0140-6736(62)92282-1

== See also ==
- List of London medical students who assisted at Belsen
