= Dennis Henry Forsdick =

British physician

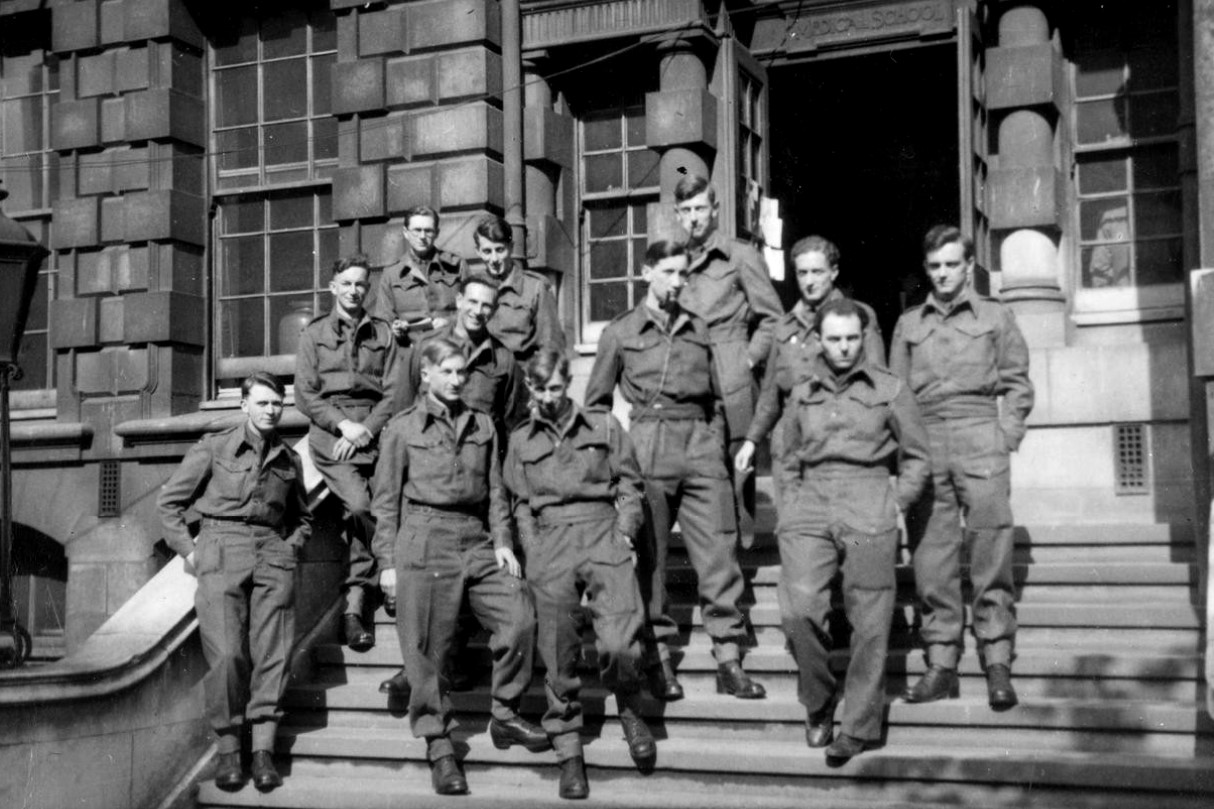
Guy's Hospital medical students who went to Belsen. Pictured from left to right: D. Davies, D. Strange, J. S. Jones, D. Rahilly, D. Westbury, M. E. Davys, D. S. Hurwood, D. H. Forsdick, J. V. Kilby, J. E. Mandel, J. L. Hayward and J. A. Turner.

Dennis Henry Forsdick (2 January 1924 – 9 December 2016), was a British physician at the Friarsgate Medical Centre. In 1945, while studying medicine at Guy's Hospital, he assisted at Bergen-Belsen concentration camp as a voluntary medical student.

== Publications ==
- "Neonatal myasthenia gravis; report of a case". British Medical Journal, Vol. 7, No. 1 (February 1953), pp. 314–6. PMID 13009187 doi:10.1136/bmj.1.4805.314

== See also ==
- List of London medical students who assisted at Belsen
