= David Sells Hurwood =

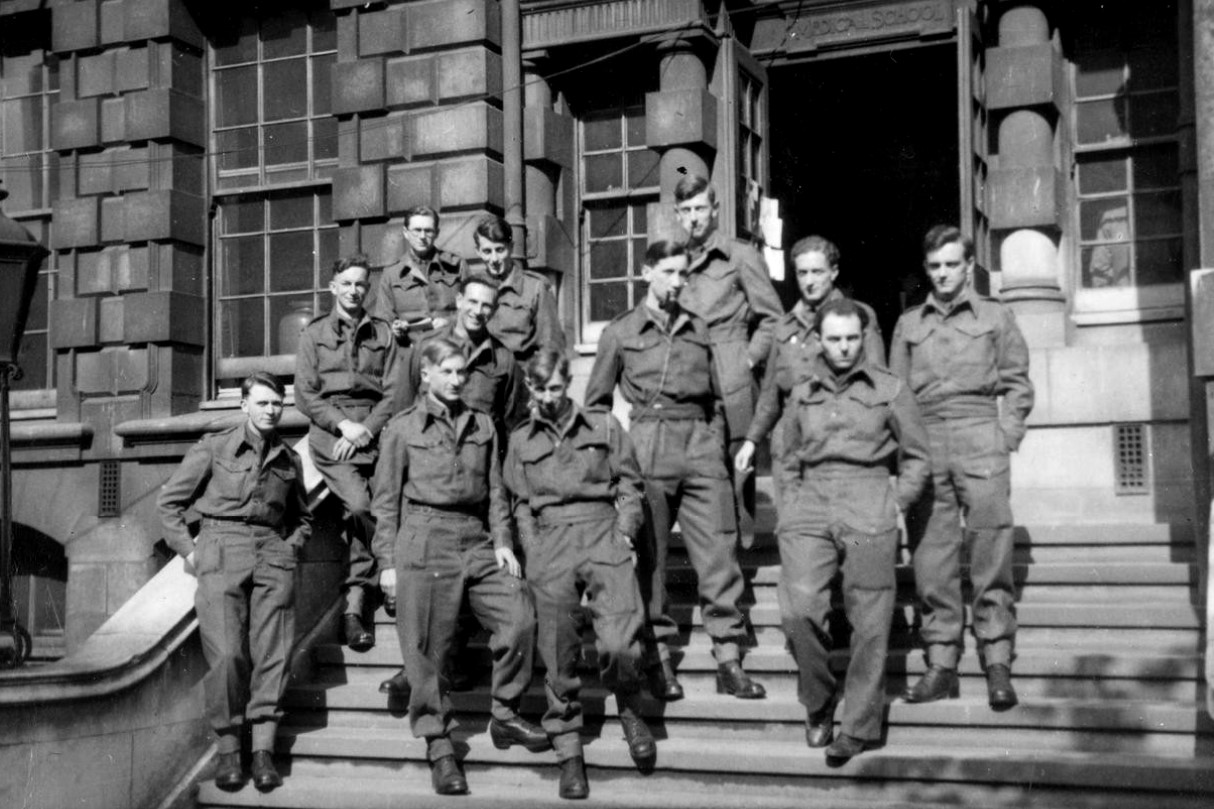
Guy's Hospital medical students who went to Belsen. Pictured from left to right: D. Davies, D. Strange, J. S. Jones, D. Rahilly, D. Westbury, M. E. Davys, D. S. Hurwood, D. H. Forsdick, J. V. Kilby, J. E. Mandel, J. L. Hayward and J. A. Turner.

David Sells Hurwood (1924 – 22 May 2005) was a British general practitioner in Syston and founder member of the Royal College of General Practitioners. In 1945, while studying medicine at Guy's Hospital, he assisted at Bergen-Belsen concentration camp as a voluntary medical student. Here, he developed tuberculosis.

== Selected publications ==
- "Out-of-hours calls in a Leicestershire practice". British Medical Journal, Vol. 1, No. 6025 (26 June 2006), pp. 1582–1584. doi:10.1136/bmj.1.6025.1582
