= John Spencer Jones =

British physician

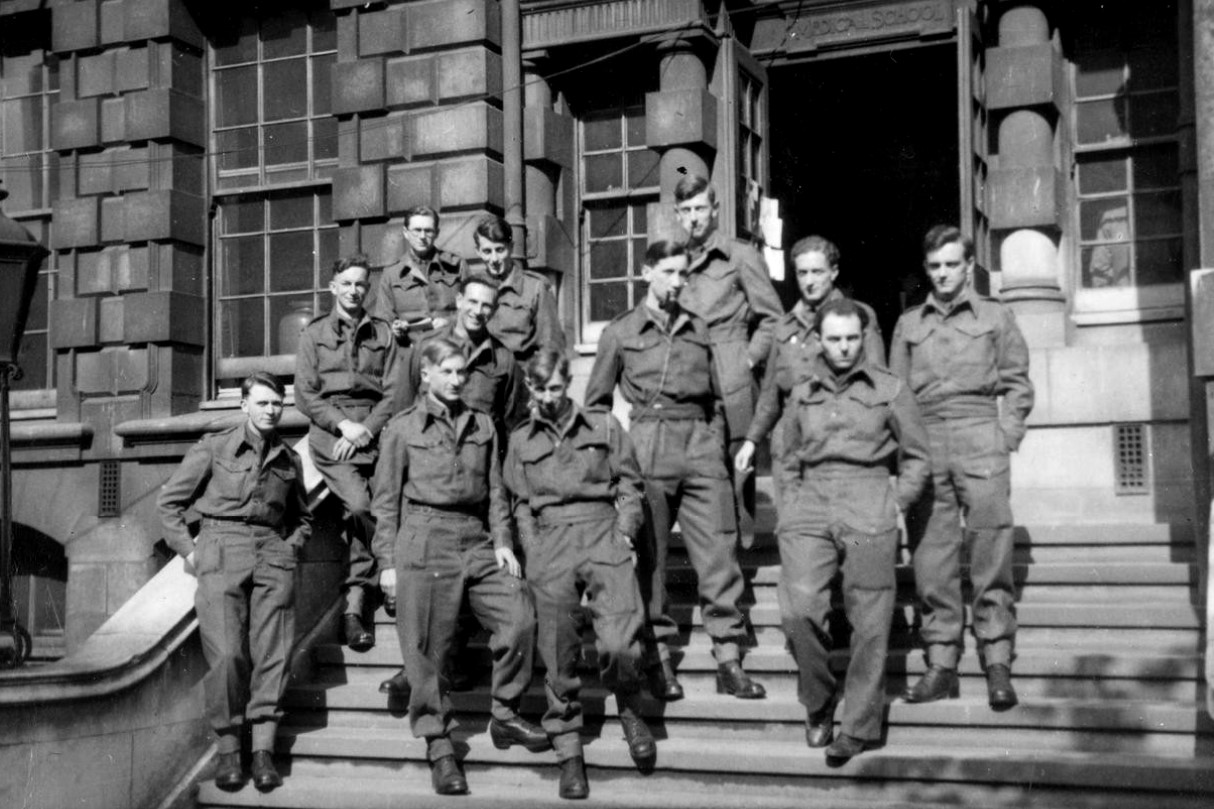
Guy's Hospital medical students who went to Belsen. Pictured from left to right: D. Davies, D. Strange, J. S. Jones, D. Rahilly, D. Westbury, M. E. Davys, D. S. Hurwood, D. H. Forsdick, J. V. Kilby, J. E Mandel, J. L. Hayward and J. A. Turner.

John Spencer Jones (1924 – 11 March 2007) was a British chest physician. In 1945, while studying medicine at Guy's Hospital, he assisted at Bergen-Belsen concentration camp as a voluntary medical student. Here, he developed tuberculosis. He later authored a number of articles in medical journals including "Telling the right patient" in the British Medical Journal (1981), where he reported that 50% of people with terminal disease "want to know that this is so".

== Selected publications ==
- Jones, J (1981). "Telling the right patient". Br Med J (Clin Res Ed). 283: 291–2. doi:10.1136/bmj.283.6286.291. PMC 1506337. PMID 6788299.
