= Kenneth Robertson Dempster =

British pathologist

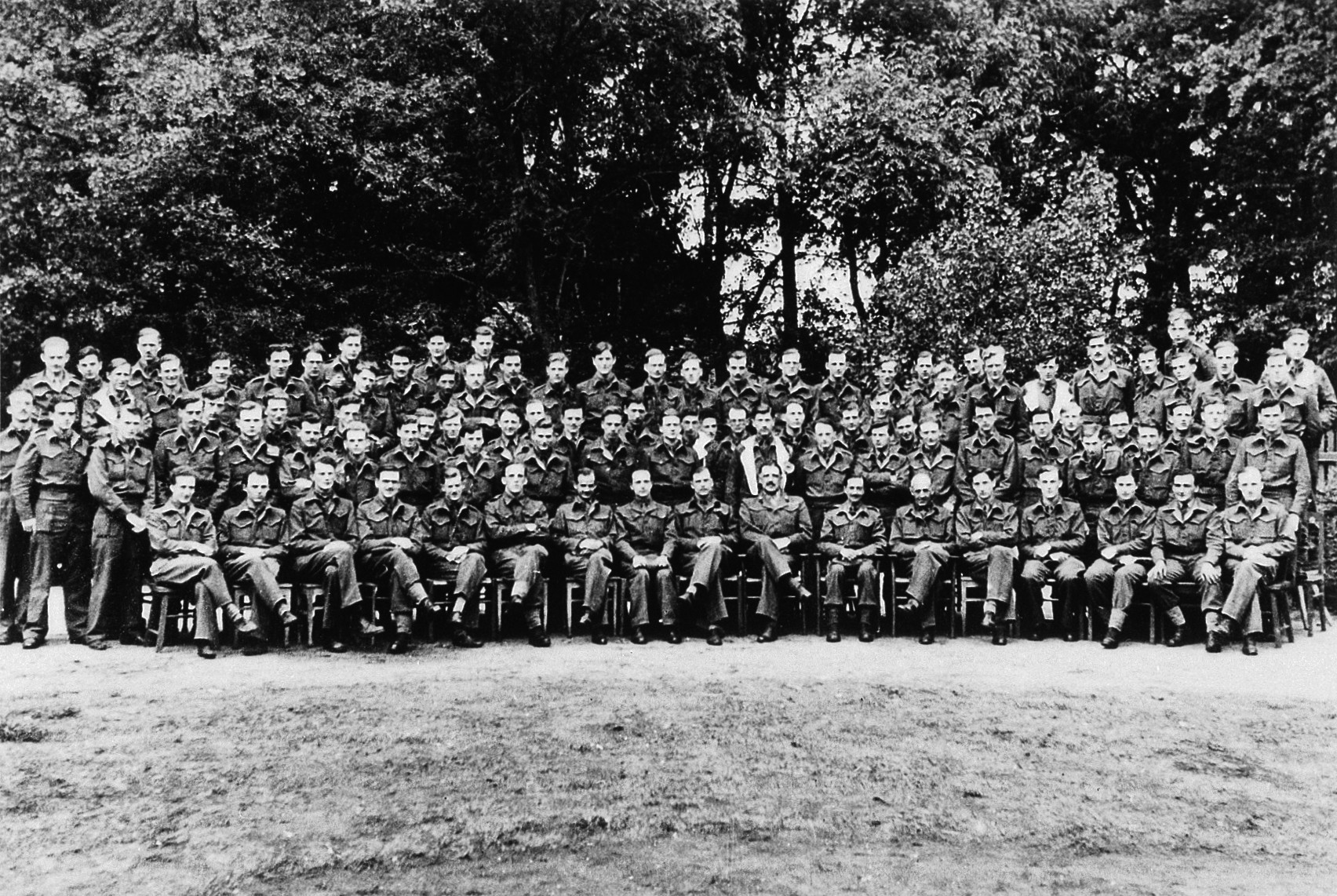
Group photo of London Medical students who went to Belsen

Kenneth Robertson Dempster (1924 – 6 March 2001), also known as Claude Dempster, was a British pathologist at the King Edward VII Hospital, Windsor, who in 1945, while studying at St Thomas' Hospital, assisted at Bergen-Belsen concentration camp when he volunteered as a medical student.
