= Melton, Suffolk =

Coordinates: 52.105752°N 1.331663°E

Melton
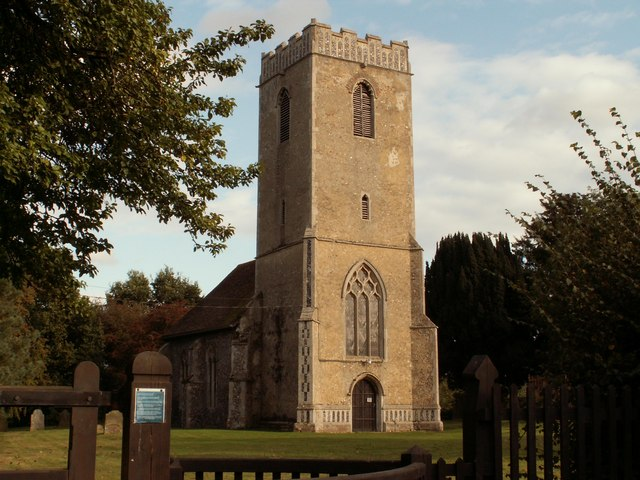
- St. Andrew's, Melton old church

- Location within Suffolk
- Population: 3,741 (2011)
- Civil parish: Melton
- District: East Suffolk
- Shire county: Suffolk
- Region: East
- Country: England
- Sovereign state: United Kingdom
- Post town: WOODBRIDGE
- Postcode district: IP12
- Dialling code: 01394
- Police: Suffolk
- Fire: Suffolk
- Ambulance: East of England
- UK Parliament: Suffolk Coastal

Melton is a village and civil parish in the East Suffolk district, in Suffolk, England, located approximately one mile northeast of Woodbridge. The 2001 census recorded a population of 3,718, the population increasing to 3,741 at the 2011 Census. The village is served by Melton railway station on the Ipswich-Lowestoft East Suffolk Line. The parish contains 'Woodbridge' Melton, an area of building contiguous with Woodbridge but separated from most of Melton by the wood, 'Village' Melton, centred around the A1152 and A1438, Melton Park or Melton St Audry's, a housing estate converted from an asylum, and various outlying hamlets.

Melton was the effective capital of the Liberty of St Etheldreda and housed a gaol and various other buildings.

== History ==
Melton is mentioned in the Domesday Book of 1086. In 1765 a local Act established the Loes and Wilford Hundred Incorporation at Melton. The House of Industry (workhouse) operated until its disincorporation in 1826. From 1826 the building became the Suffolk County Asylum for Pauper Lunatics. Much altered during the 19th and early 20th centuries, in 1916 the asylum became known as St Audry's Hospital, which was closed in 1993 (approx date). The buildings have been converted into residential accommodation.

Melton was originally settled around the old church in the north east of Melton, later moving to Yarmouth Road, which is the old road between Great Yarmouth and London.

The bestselling Victorian novelist Henry Seton Merriman died in Melton in 1903, aged 41.

Musician Brian Eno was born in the village on 15 May 1948.

== Governance ==
Melton is part of the electoral ward called Melton and Ufford. The population of this was 4,883 at the 2011 Census. From 1974 to 2019 it was in Suffolk Coastal district.
