= Andrew Edward Bertie Matthews =

British medical student (died 1995)

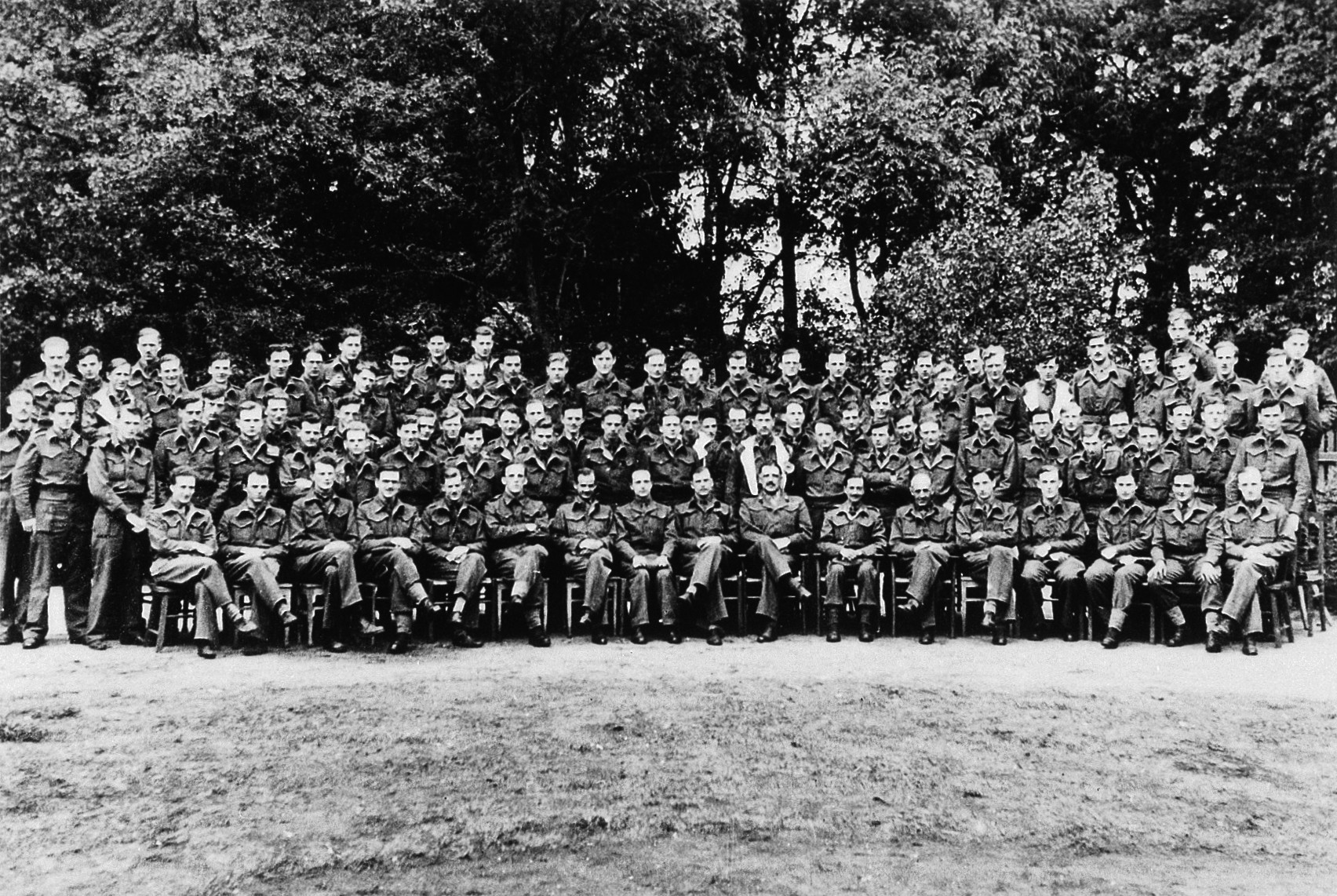
Group photo of London Medical students who went to Belsen, 1945

Andrew Edward Bertie Matthews (died 1995), was one of the St Mary's medical students who volunteered to assist at Bergen-Belsen concentration camp in 1945.
