= St Audry's Hospital =

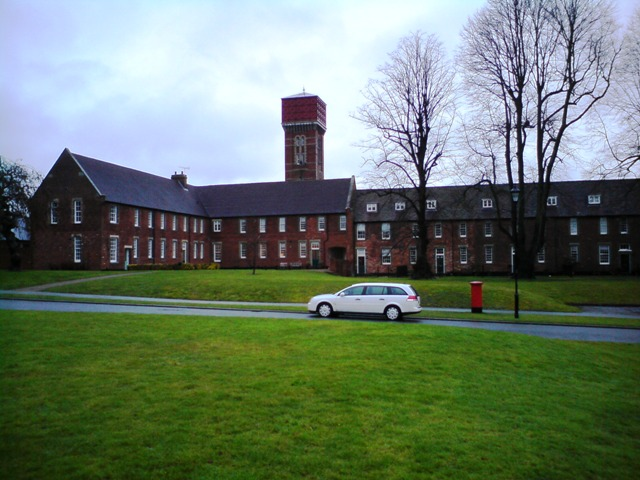
- The former St Audry's Hospital converted into residences (photo 2009)

- Shown in Suffolk

Geography
- Location: Melton, Suffolk, England, United Kingdom
- Coordinates: 52.1168°N 1.3354°E

Organisation
- Care system: Public NHS
- Type: Long-stay psychiatric

Services
- Emergency department: No Accident & Emergency

History
- Founded: 1827
- Closed: 1993

Links
- Lists: Hospitals in England

St Audry's Hospital was a psychiatric hospital in Melton, Suffolk, England.

== History ==
The facility has its origins in a house of industry which was acquired by the county authority in Suffolk in 1827 and converted into a lunatic asylum in 1829. The asylum was re-modeled to a design by Scott and Moffatt in 1844. A chapel was added in 1862, additional ward pavilions were built in an echelon formation in the 1870s and two more ward blocks were completed in 1904.

The facility became St Audry's Hospital for Mental Diseases in 1917. The hospital was closed in 1993, and converted for use as residences. The administration block with the main entrance has been a Grade II listed building since 11 June 1985, and the South Entrance Pavilion has been Grade II listed since 14 November 1997.
