= Pamela Vandyke Price =

British wine taster and writer

Pamela Joan Vandyke-Price
- Born: 21 March 1923; Coventry
- Died: 12 January 2014 (aged 90); London
- Education: Somerville College, Oxford
- Occupation: Wine writer
- Writing career
- Subject: wine

Pamela Joan Vandyke-Price née Pamela Joan Walford) (21 March 1923 – 12 January 2014) was a British Wine taster and writer. She is credited as the first British woman to write about wine and spirits. She was known for her strong opinions.

== Life ==
Vandyke-Price was an only child born in Coventry (one source says Leicester). Her mother, Florence Amélie née Halliday, was French and her father, Harry Norman Walford was a manager in a watch making business. She read English at Somerville College, Oxford, attending lectures held by J. R. R. Tolkien and C. S. Lewis. She went on to study at the Central School of Speech and Drama. During her time there, she met Alan Vandyke Price a student doctor and her future husband. They married in 1950 and she became a journalist at Home and Garden. Her husband died in 1955 from hepatitis which he had caught as part of his job. She consoled herself by entering a platonic relationship with Allan Sichel, who was the owner of a wine company and would become her mentor on wine-making and -tasting.

In 1966 she wrote the book, "France - a Food and Wine Guide". It was not her first book but this one sold well.

She was a wine writer. Credited as the first UK woman to write about wine and spirits. She was the editor of Condé Nast's Wine and Food Magazine until it changed ownership and then she went to write for the Times. She was the first recipient of the 1971 Glenfiddich awards, which she was granted again in 1973. After twelve years at the Times she was sacked.

At some point she started the Circle of Wine Writers.

In 1975 she wrote "The Taste of Wine". In 1980 she published "The Penguin Book of Spirits and Liqueurs" and the following year she was knighted when the French government gave her the Order of Agricultural Merit.

She died on 12 January 2014 in London leaving behind instructions of who not to invite to her funeral.
