= Sexually Transmitted Infections (journal) =

- Discipline: Sexual health, medicine
- Language: English
- Edited by: Anna Maria Geretti

Publication details
- History: 1925–present
- Publisher: BMJ Group
- Frequency: 8/year
- Open access: Hybrid option available to authors
- Impact factor: 3 (2025)

Standard abbreviations
- ISO 4: Sex. Transm. Infect.

Indexing
- ISSN: 1368-4973 (print); 1472-3263 (web)
- OCLC no.: 38852612

Links
- Journal homepage; Online access; Online archive

Sexually Transmitted Infections is a peer-reviewed medical journal that publishes original research, descriptive epidemiology, evidence-based reviews and comment on the clinical, public health, translational, sociological and laboratory aspects of sexual health, HIV and AIDS, from around the world. It also publishes educational articles, letters, a blog and podcasts.

It is the official journal of the British Association for Sexual Health and HIV (BASHH).

Its editor-in-chief is Anna Maria Geretti (Institute of Infection and Global Health, University of Liverpool, UK).

== Abstracting and indexing ==
The journal is abstracted and indexed in Web of Science Core Collection: Science Citation Index, Science Citation Index Extended; BIOSIS Reviews; Current Contents: Clinical Medicine, Life Sciences, MEDLINE (Index Medicus), PubMed Central (BMJ Open Access Special Collections), Google Scholar, Scopus, Excerpta Medica/EMBASE and CINAHL.
