= Winterton Hospital =

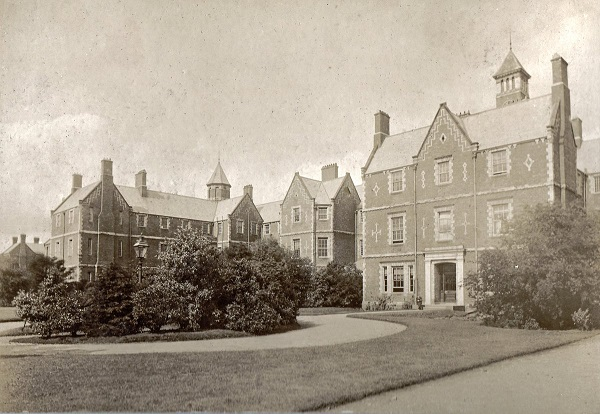
- Winterton Hospital

- Shown in County Durham

Geography
- Location: Sedgefield, County Durham, England, United Kingdom
- Coordinates: 54.6704°N 1.4501°W

Organisation
- Care system: Public NHS
- Type: Specialist

Services
- Speciality: Mental health

History
- Founded: 1858

Links
- Lists: Hospitals in England

Winterton Hospital was a psychiatric hospital north of Sedgefield in County Durham, England.

== History ==
A site for the facility at Far Winterton, north of Sedgefield, was purchased in 1855. It was designed by the architect John Howison, the surveyor for the county of Durham, as a three-storey corridor plan asylum built in the Elizabethan style with 300 beds for inmates, along with a chapel and superintendent's quarters. The facility opened as Durham County Lunatic Asylum in 1858.

A major extension of the hospital, designed by William Crozier Jr. using a pavilion plan in the Italianate style with 400 beds for inmates as well as adding a new chapel, water tower, stables and cottages, was built between 1875 and 1880.

The facility became Durham County Mental Hospital in 1925. Further major additions, providing new admission and administration blocks, were made in the 1930s. A hutted emergency hospital was built on the site during the Second World War. The hospital joined the National Health Service in 1948 and became a psychiatric facility known as Winterton Hospital in 1949. It has been wrongly claimed that The League of Gentlemen performer and writer Mark Gatiss grew up around Winterton Hospital while his father worked there as an engineer in 1970s, but it seems he worked at a similar hospital at School Aycliffe; both hospitals have now been demolished. (Note: The details concerning Gatiss is an innocently made, and persistent, mistake. Whilst it is true that his father worked at a hospital, and also factual that Gatiss based his experiences on times spent growing up around that hospital, the truth is that his father, worked at a now long-gone mental hospital (similar to Winterton) in School Aycliffe, some ten or so miles to the west of Winterton. The confusion has arisen due to the fact that both hospitals lay within the district of Sedgefield. And seeing as Gatiss was born at the nearby Sedgefield Maternity Hospital, (Now the Hardwick Hall Hotel), then somewhere along the line, Winterton was guessed at, as being the logical location that Gatiss once talked of. This error likely originated, quite innocently, from the newspaper carrying the interview.)

Following the introduction of Care in the Community, Winterton Hospital went into a period of decline and eventually closed in 1996. During demolition, contractors broke through into basement tunnels and rooms and discovered various preserved specimens taken from inmates. The site has since been developed as a science park known as NETPark which was opened by the Prime Minister, Tony Blair, in 2005.

The hutted emergency hospital developed into Sedgefield General Hospital but, after in-patient services were transferred to the North Tees General Hospital in the 1960s, Sedgefield General Hospital was downgraded to the status of a community hospital, and operated as such until it was relocated to Salters Lane in 2003. After the site had been cleared, a secure residential centre was planned for people with mental health problems, but was never built. In 2017, a residential development, known as Hardwick Grange, was granted planning permission in its place.
