= Arnold Peter Meiklejohn =

English physician and academic (1909–1961)

- Born: 1909
- Died: 14 June 1961 (aged 51–52)
- Education: Oriel College, Oxford; St Mary's Hospital, London
- Known for: Feeding of inmates and the supervision of 97 medical students at Bergen-Belsen concentration camp
- Scientific career
- Institutions: Harvard Medical School; United Nations Relief and Rehabilitation Administration; University of Edinburgh

Arnold Peter Meiklejohn (1909 – 14 June 1961) was an English physician and academic, specializing in nutrition.

In 1938, he was elected as a Peabody Fellow of the Harvard Medical School and during the Second World War worked for the Rockefeller Foundation and as nutrition adviser to UNRRA. In 1945, shortly after the liberation of Bergen-Belsen concentration camp, Meiklejohn was put in charge of administering a starvation diet to the camp's severely malnourished and dying inmates.

After the war, he became a lecturer in nutrition at the University of Edinburgh and in 1947, at the request of the Medical Research Council (MRC), assessed and reported on the state of nutrition of German civilians.

He wrote a number of papers on nutrition, particularly on errors of metabolism, and with Sir Stanley Davidson and R. Passmore was co-author of the textbook Human Nutrition and Dietetics (1959).

== Early life ==
Peter Meiklejohn was born in Harpenden in 1909. He attended Gresham's School, where he was a contemporary of W.H. Auden, Stephen Spender, and John Pudney. From there, he was awarded a scholarship to Oriel College, Oxford, and in 1931 graduated BSc in physiology with first-class honours. He then gained admission to St Mary's Hospital, London, to study medicine, and in 1935 achieved his B.M., B.Ch. He was then a house physician in the St Mary's Medical Unit, and in 1936 gained a Radcliffe Travelling Fellowship. In 1938, he was elected as a Peabody Fellow of the Harvard Medical School. For three years he worked with leading American physicians who included George Minot and William Bosworth Castle, and from 1939 to 1941 published papers in The New England Journal of Medicine on human nutritional deficiencies, writing often on errors of metabolism. In 1941, his paper "Is Thiamine the Anti-neuritis Vitamin?" was published in The Johns Hopkins Bulletin.

In 1941, Meiklejohn became a member of the Rockefeller Foundation Health Commission. He returned to live in England, and the 1942 edition of The Medical Directory gives his address as 15, Ox Lane, Harpenden, Hertfordshire.

== Second World War work ==
During the Second World War, Meiklejohn became nutrition adviser to the United Nations Relief and Rehabilitation Administration (UNRRA).

=== Bergen-Belsen concentration camp ===
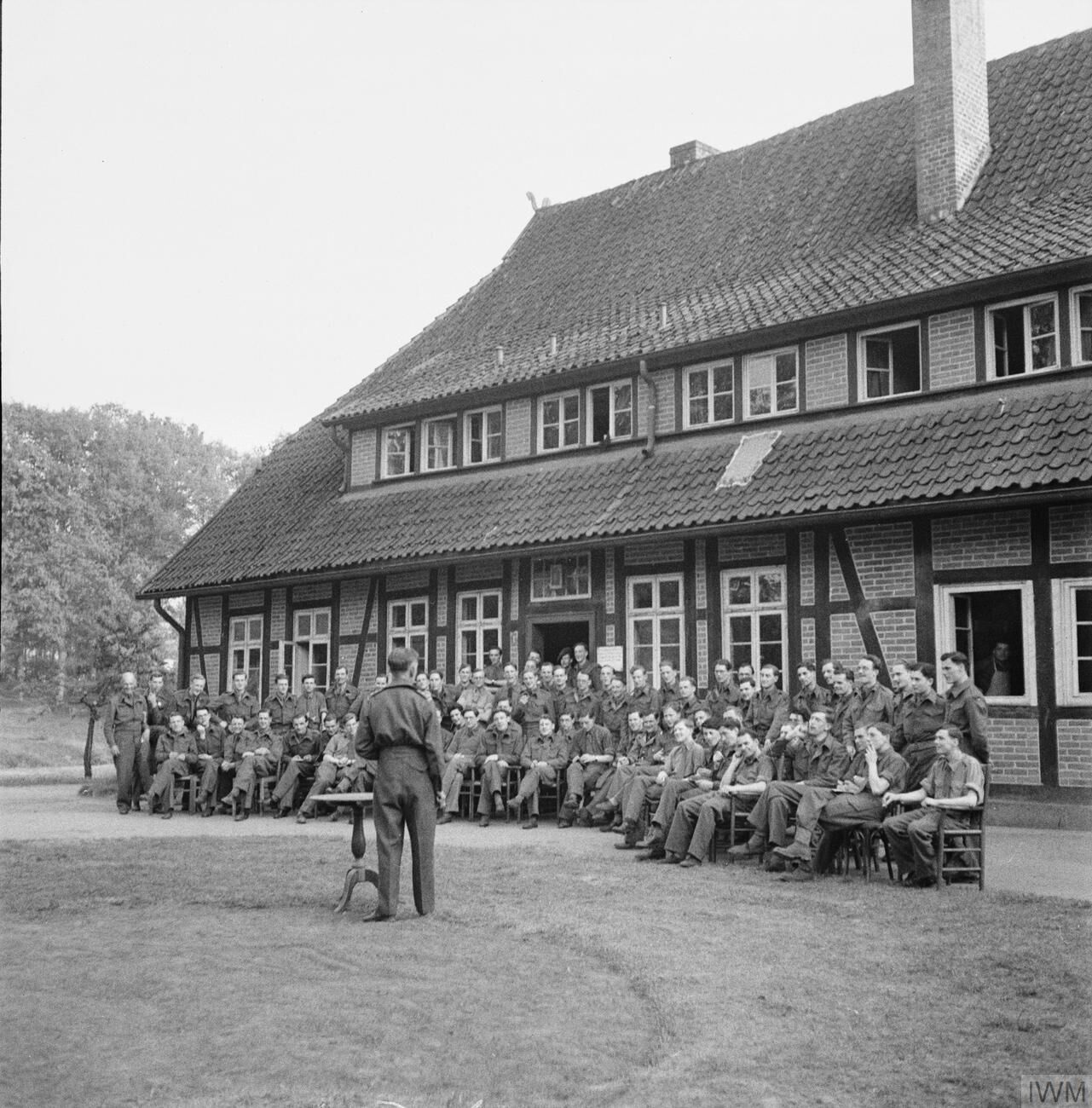
British medical students employed at Belsen, May 1945

On 29 April 1945, Meiklejohn arrived at Bergen-Belsen concentration camp shortly after its liberation by British forces, with the responsibility of administering the starvation diet to the severely malnourished and dying inmates.

He led one of two teams sent on behalf of UNRRA, the other team being led by Janet Vaughan. At the time, the death rate at the camp was estimated at 500 or 600 per day when he was sent either 95, 96 or 97 volunteer medical students from London medical schools, to assist him in camp I, at the request of Brigadier Hugh Glyn-Hughes and the War Office. Here, typhus and starvation were prevalent. They included Michael Hargrave, whose diary, later published as Bergen-Belsen 1945: A Medical Student's Journal, details his month-long experience at the camp and describes the introductory briefing on the challenges they would face, given by Meiklejohn. Other students included Alex Paton who published his memoirs of Belsen in the British Medical Journal in 1981 and David Philip Bowler who later had a career in community child health, for which he was awarded the Advance Australia Award for his work in the care of Aboriginal children. Some of the students memoirs were used by author Ben Shephard in the book After Daybreak: The Liberation of Belsen, 1945. On being questioned about the achievements of the students, Meiklejohn responded that "they had restored the moral order".

Feeding in camp I of Belsen was a major problem. Generous rich food was not tolerated by inmates who had starved for so long. Despite a number of cookhouses and co-ordinating offices, simply handing out food was not enough. Meiklejohn wondered why a mixture that worked so well in Bengal was so disastrous in Belsen. It was, according to the rabbi Reverend Leslie Hardman, "revoltingly sweet". Meiklejohn postulated that the unpopular Bengal mixture, made of dried milk, flour, sugar and molasses which was used in the Bengal famine of 1943 likely halved the death rate from starvation. People in the students' hospital lived due to the work of the students and he commended them for their organisation. The mixture was much too sweet for eastern Europeans.

Meiklejohn also led the postmortems of some of those that died by starvation and his findings included extreme muscle wasting, swollen ankles and feet, small hearts and fluid around the heart. Almost all of those that had postmortems had tuberculosis (TB) of varying types including miliary tuberculosis and chronic TB. The stomach was sometimes found to be small from atrophy or large from gaseous distension and the large intestine could be atrophied or ulcerated.

== Later career ==
After the war, UNRRA wound down its activities, and in 1946 Meiklejohn was appointed as a senior lecturer in nutrition at the University of Edinburgh, where he remained for fifteen years and became known for his well-prepared and entertaining lectures.

Also in 1946, following a severe winter and restricted imports, leading to German demands for more food, the British Medical Research Council sponsored a number of nutritional scientists including Robert McCance, Elsie Widdowson, and Meiklejohn to report on the German state of health. All three came to the same conclusion that the Germans might have lost some weight due to food shortages but were generally not malnourished, and after examining more than 2000 Germans, Meiklejohn reported that "many adults are likely to have benefitted from losing excess weight and its complications of high blood pressure, diabetes and gall stones". He disagreed with German studies of the nutritional state of its civilians, stating the "Germans are now grossly over exaggerating the effects of the food shortage".

In 1949, Meiklejohn received the degree of D.M. In the same year his publications earned him Membership of the Royal Colleges of Physicians of the United Kingdom. In 1950 he was elected a member of the Harveian Society of Edinburgh.

In 1954 he published a paper titled "The curious obscurity of Dr James Lind" in the Journal of the History of Medicine and Allied Sciences which contributed to the inspiration of research into James Lind following the bicentenary year of the Treatise he produced.

In 1959 he co-authored the acclaimed textbook Human Nutrition and Dietetics with Sir Stanley Davidson and R. Passmore.

== Personal life ==
In 1950, Meiklejohn was on the electoral register for Edinburgh West at 9, St Bernards Crescent, with Margaret L. Campbell-Renton. In 1960, he was at 8a, Fountainhall Road, in Edinburgh South, with Jean S. Meiklejohn.

Known as Peter, and not Arnold, Meiklejohn was married to Jean, and they had two sons, who were small boys at the time of his death on 14 June 1961, in an accident while fishing in a Highland river. He was 51.

His obituary in the British Medical Journal enumerated some of his quirks, saying; "He had many amusing and endearing foibles; there were his oddities of dress, his dilapidated motor-car, his inveterate snuff-taking, and his refusal to drink coffee at lunch as he said it disturbed his post-prandial nap-normally enjoyed on the floor of his room in the Department of Medicine with his head resting on a green velvet pillow specially designed for the purpose."

== Selected publications ==
=== Articles ===
- Meiklejohn, Arnold P. (1940). "Is Thiamin the Antineuritic Vitamin?". New England Journal of Medicine. 223: 265–273. doi:10.1056/NEJM194008222230801.
- Meiklejohn, Arnold P. (1940). "The Diagnosis and Treatment of Nutritional Deficiency". New England Journal of Medicine. 222: 760–765. doi:10.1056/NEJM194005022221806.
- Kark, R; Meiklejohn, AP (1942). "THE SIGNIFICANCE OF PORPHYRINURIA IN LEAD POISONING". J Clin Invest. 21: 91–9. doi:10.1172/JCI101283. PMC 435121. PMID 16694895.
- Meiklejohn, AP (1948). "Condition of children in Western Germany". Lancet. 2: 619–23. doi:10.1016/s0140-6736(48)92147-3. PMID 18886884.
- Meiklejohn, AP (1954). "The curious obscurity of Dr. James Lind". J Hist Med Allied Sci. 9: 304–10. doi:10.1093/jhmas/ix.3.304. PMID 13184123.
- Meiklejohn, A. P. (1959). "Obesity and disease: Chairman's opening remarks". Proceedings of the Nutrition Society. 18: 140–141. doi:10.1079/PNS19590036.

=== Books ===
- Human Nutrition and Dietetics. Churchill Livingstone, Edinburgh & London, 1959. OCLC 559332508. (With Sir S. Davidson and R. Passmore.)
