= London medical students who assisted at Belsen =

Volunteers treating Nazi concentration camp victims, 1945

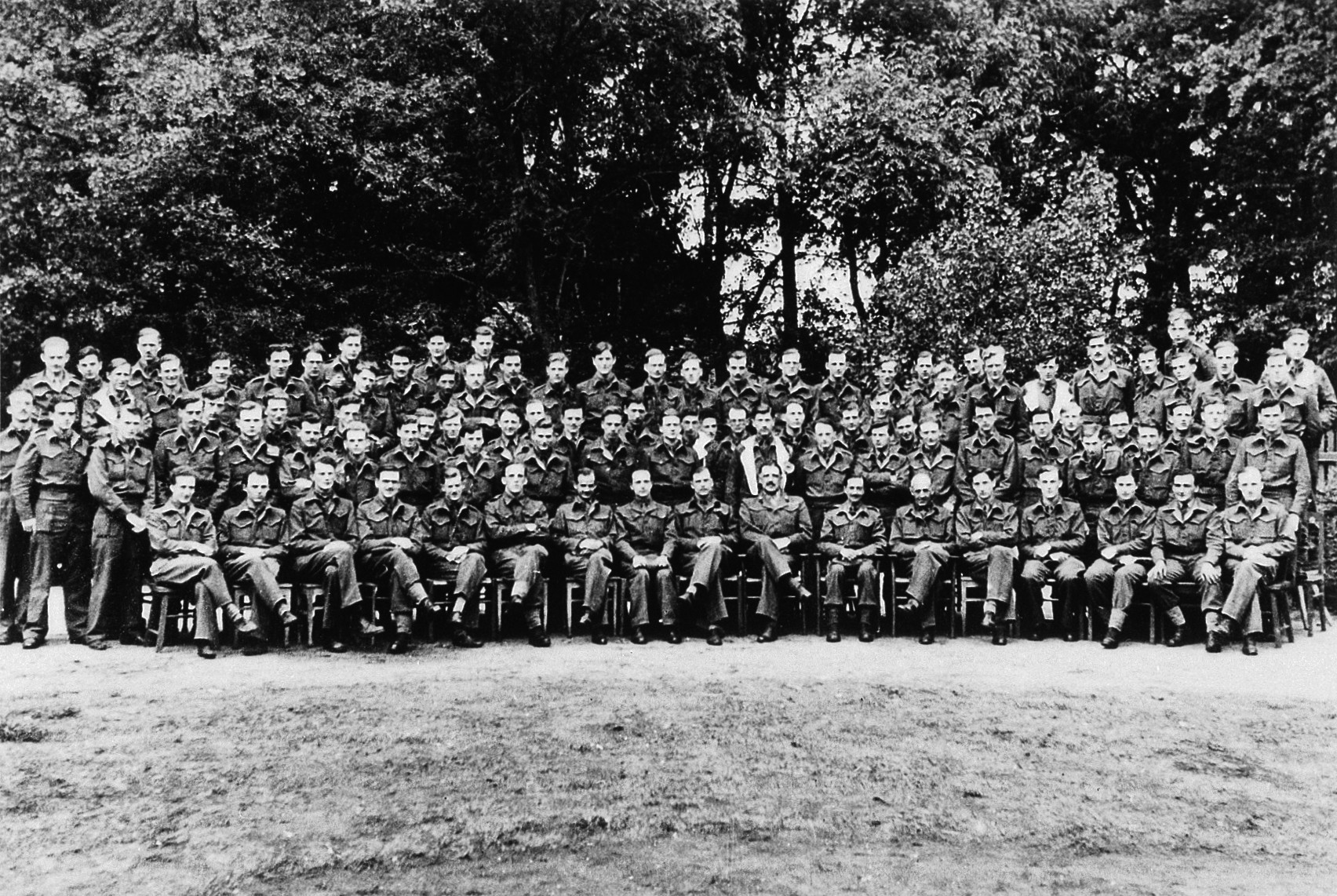
The London Medical students who went to Belsen, 1945

In early April 1945, at the request of the British Army, the British Red Cross and the War Office called for 100 volunteer medical students from nine London teaching hospitals to assist in feeding starving Dutch children who had been liberated from German occupation by advancing Allied forces. However, in the meantime, British troops had liberated Bergen-Belsen concentration camp and the students were diverted there on the day they were due to travel to the Netherlands. The students had previously spent most of the Second World War at school and in medical training.

The students were tasked with taking over one or two of the 200 camp huts each, with the responsibility of cleaning and feeding the survivors and supervising a fair distribution of food. Their work was instrumental in reducing the death rate from over 500 a day at liberation to less than 100 a day by mid-May 1945.

Sources show that twelve students came from each of Guy's Hospital, St Thomas', St Mary's, The London and University College, eleven from Westminster, nine from St Bartholomew's, eight from the Middlesex and the remainder from King's.

The Imperial War Museum holds a number of the students' letters and diaries which were a source for Ben Shephard's 2005 book After Daybreak: The Liberation of Belsen, 1945. Their story has also been portrayed in the 2007 feature-length drama, The Relief of Belsen. The diary of Westminster student Michael Hargrave was published in 2014.

== Recruitment ==
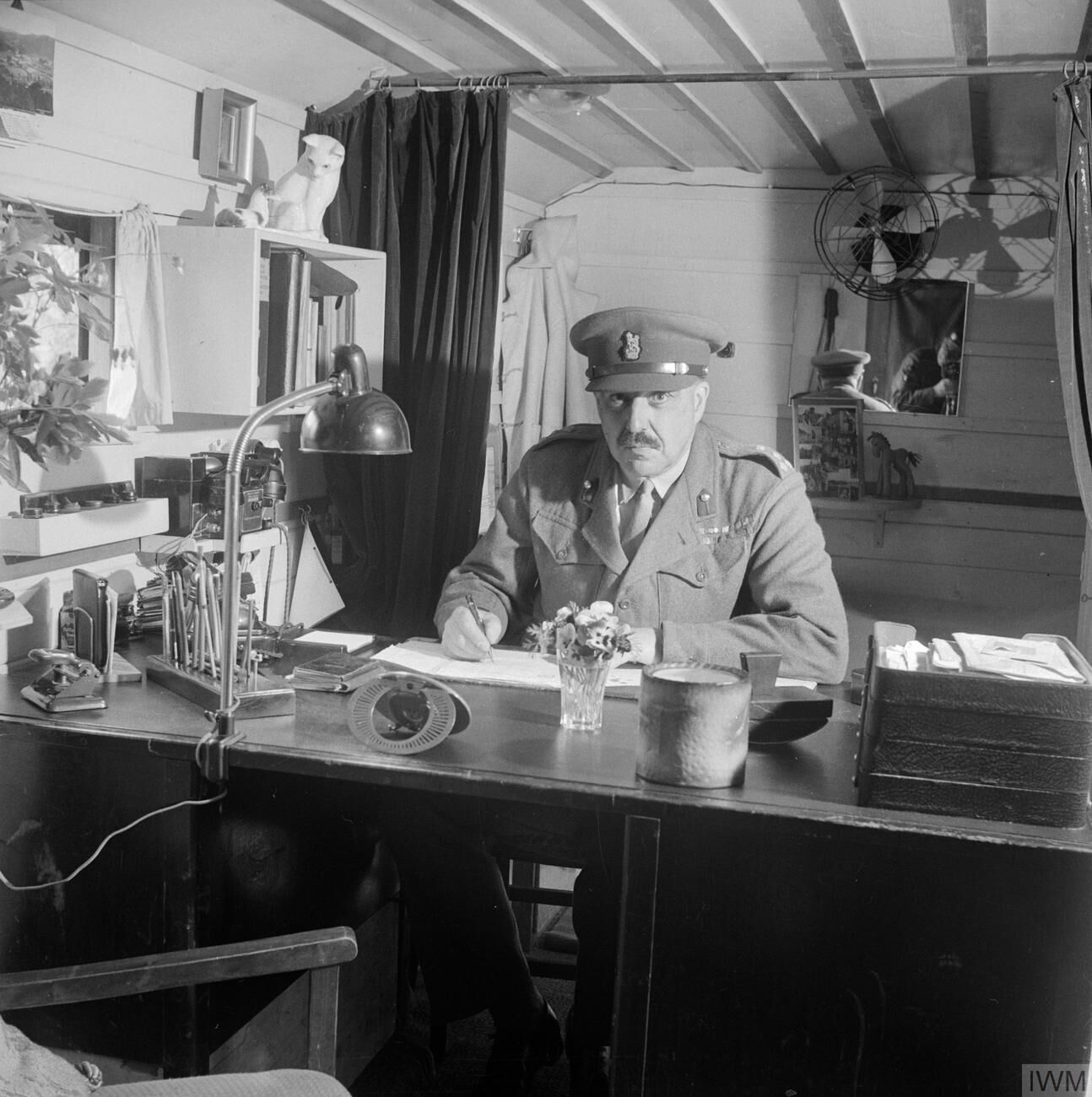
Brigadier Hugh Glyn-Hughes, June 1945.

In early April 1945, a call for 100 volunteer medical students in their final 18 months of medical school was made by the British Red Cross and the War Office at the request of the British Army, to assist in feeding starving Dutch children. However, in the interim, British troops had liberated Belsen and at the request of Brigadier Hugh Glyn-Hughes, the students were diverted to Belsen on the day of departure to Holland. The total number of students who volunteered was more than 100 and they were therefore shortlisted by ballot. Somewhere between 95 and 100 took part, with the exact number uncertain. Laurence Wand, a student from St Bartholomew's, later recounted the events of 1945 and gave with certainty the number as 96 as "this number fitted neatly into six Dakota aircraft which were to be used for our transport to Germany". Up until this time, these students had spent the larger part of the Second World War at school and in medical education. Several students had previously attended Epsom College.

== Journey to Belsen ==
At the end of April 1945, the students were immunised against typhoid, typhus and diphtheria. Dressed in battledress, at 2pm on 28 April 1945, they met the British Red Cross at 5, Lowndes Street after having some official photographs taken. Student Michael Hargrave described in his diary that day that there were "some very faked photographs of me shaking hands with the Dean - supposed to be saying goodbye". Upon arrival at Lowndes Street, they were given their passports, ranking cards and military documents. They were to fly to Holland. However, Belsen, in Germany, had in the interim been liberated by British troops and a request for extra help was made upon realising the extent of the problems there. The students were subsequently informed that they would be re-directed to Belsen. Hargrave, wrote that same day "this was the first news we had been given about going to Belsen but we were all so excited abound, after a month of waiting, that we did not think much about the change in destination".

Over the following few days, six Dakotas set off from Cirencester with the destination of Celle in Germany. Due to problems with the weather, the aircraft arrived at Celle on different days, with two having to return to Cirencester via Croydon. They were to be under the supervision of nutritionist Arnold Peter Meiklejohn.

== Belsen ==
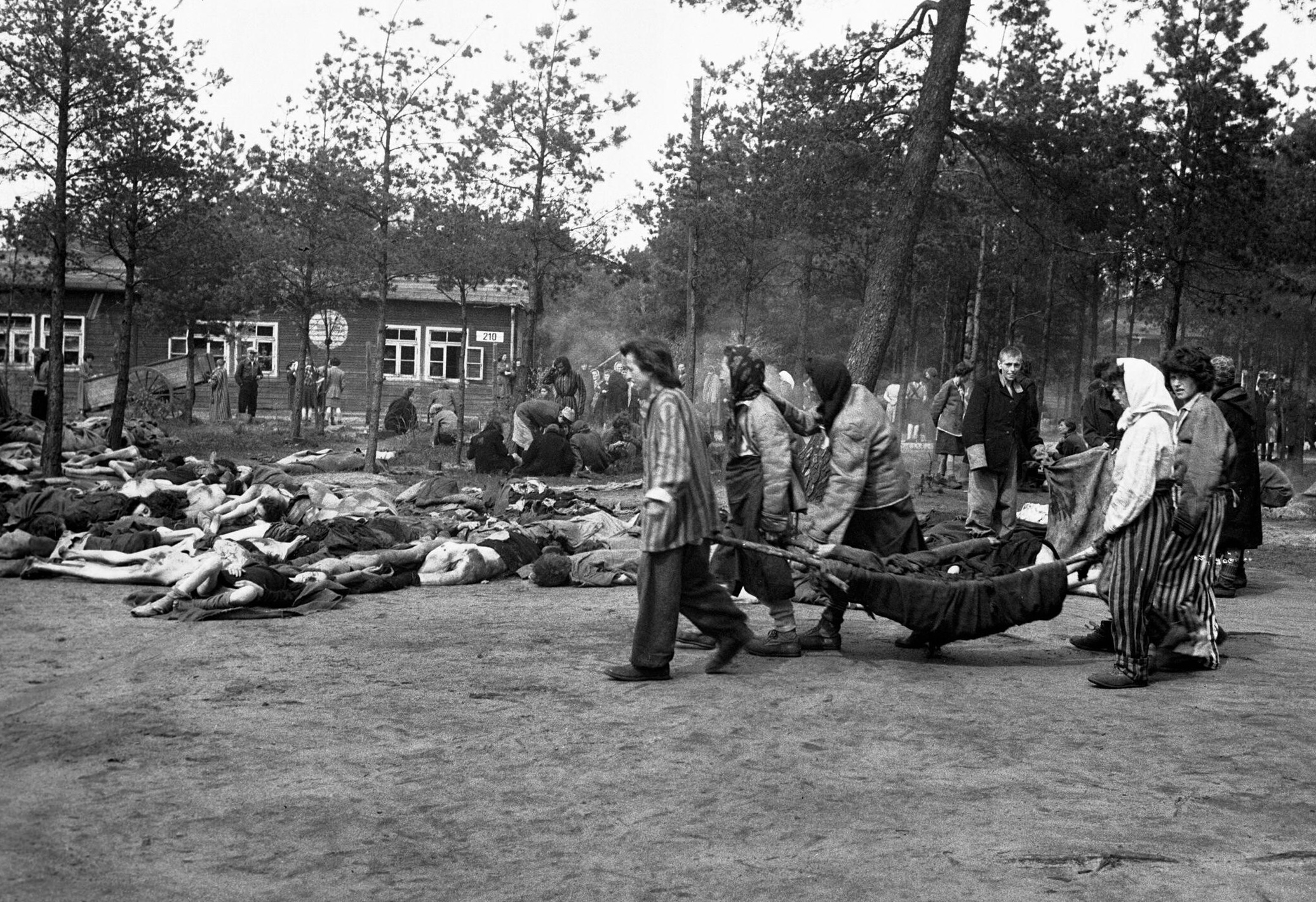
The scene at Bergen-Belsen, April 1945

=== Arrival ===
The first students arrived at Belsen at the end of April 1945, with the remaining students reaching the camp at the beginning of May 1945. Following a briefing by Meiklejohn on 2 May 1945, they began work at Camp 1 the following day.

=== Roles ===
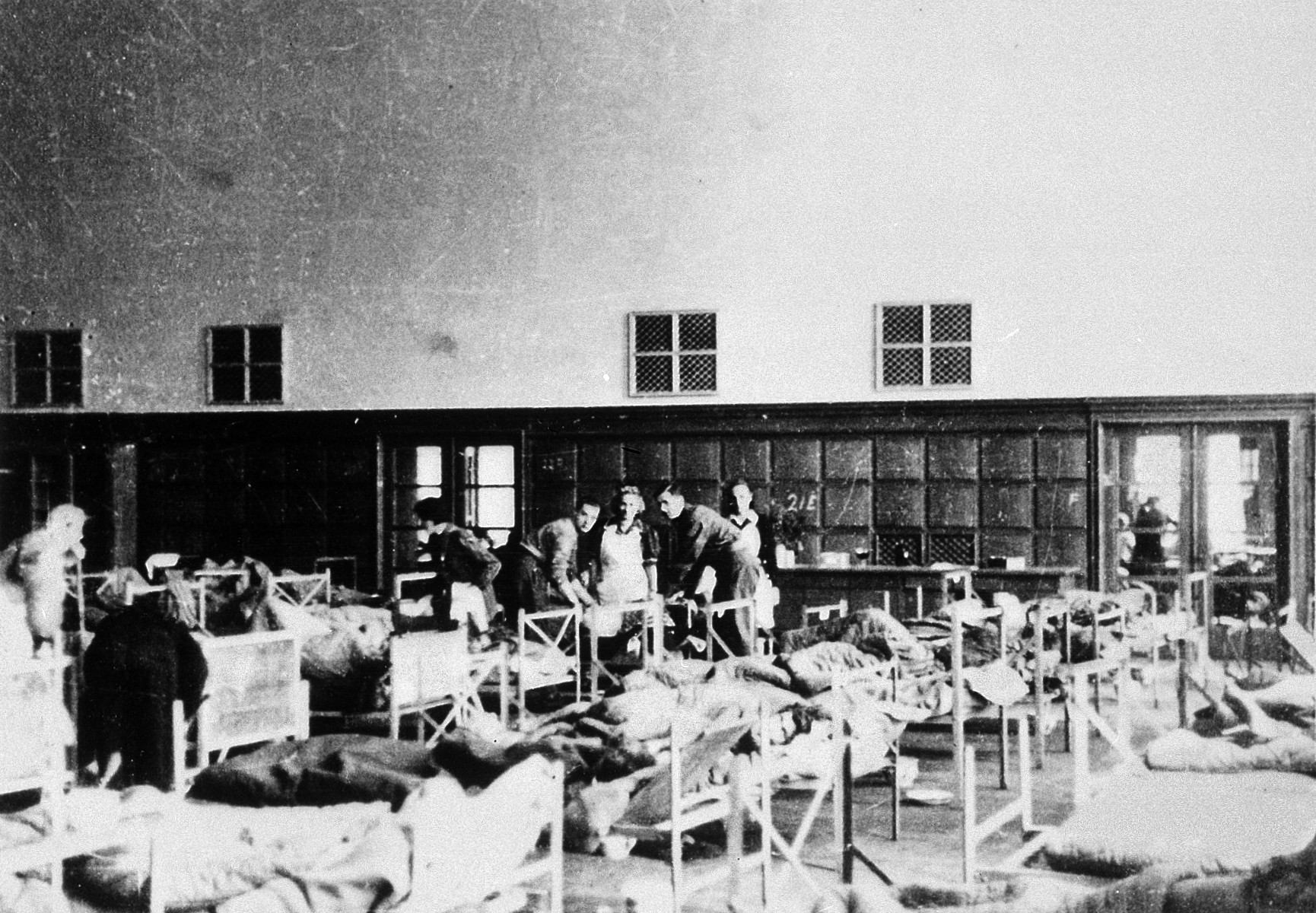
London medical students at work in Belsen

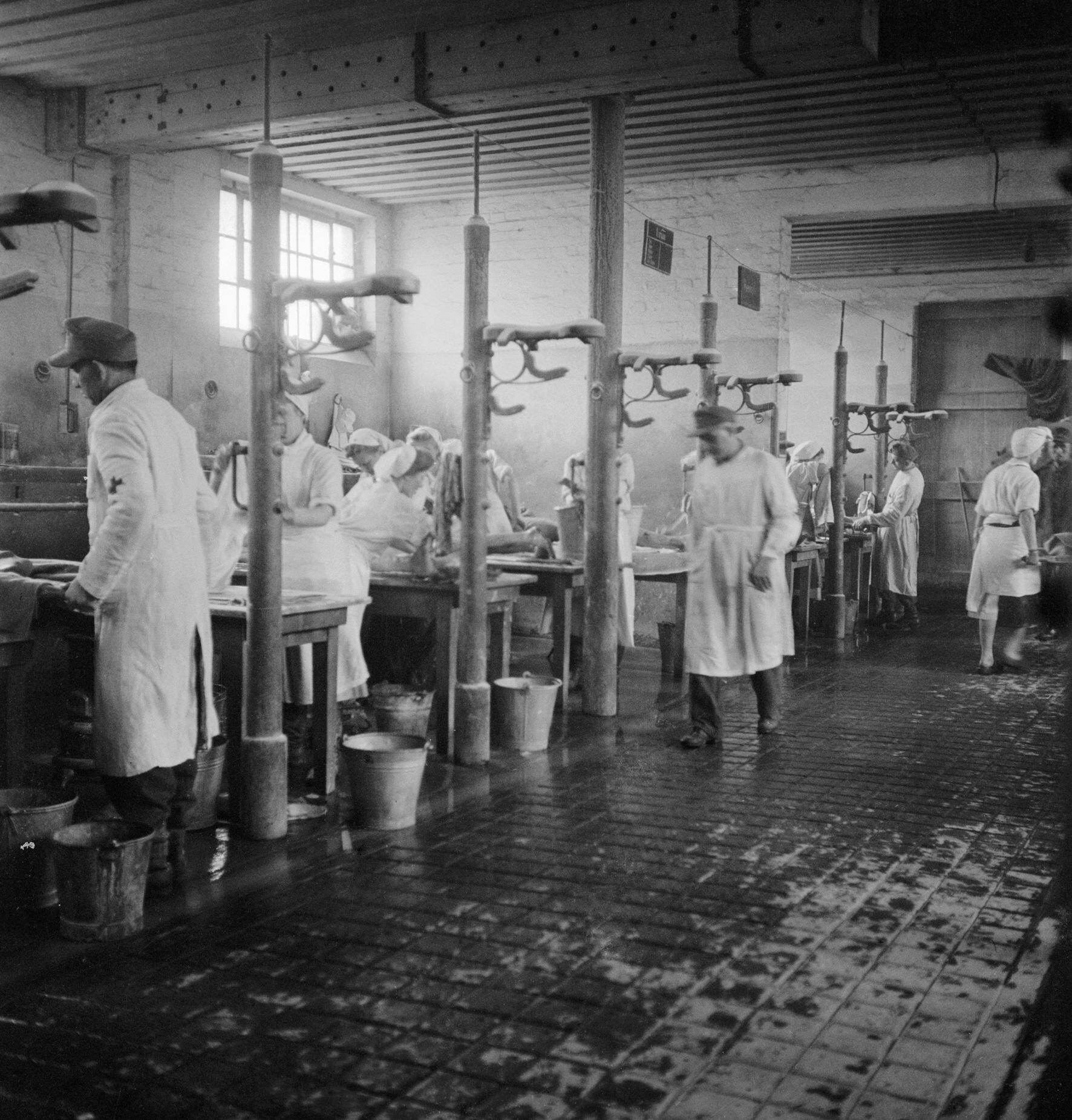
Bergen Belsen: human laundry.

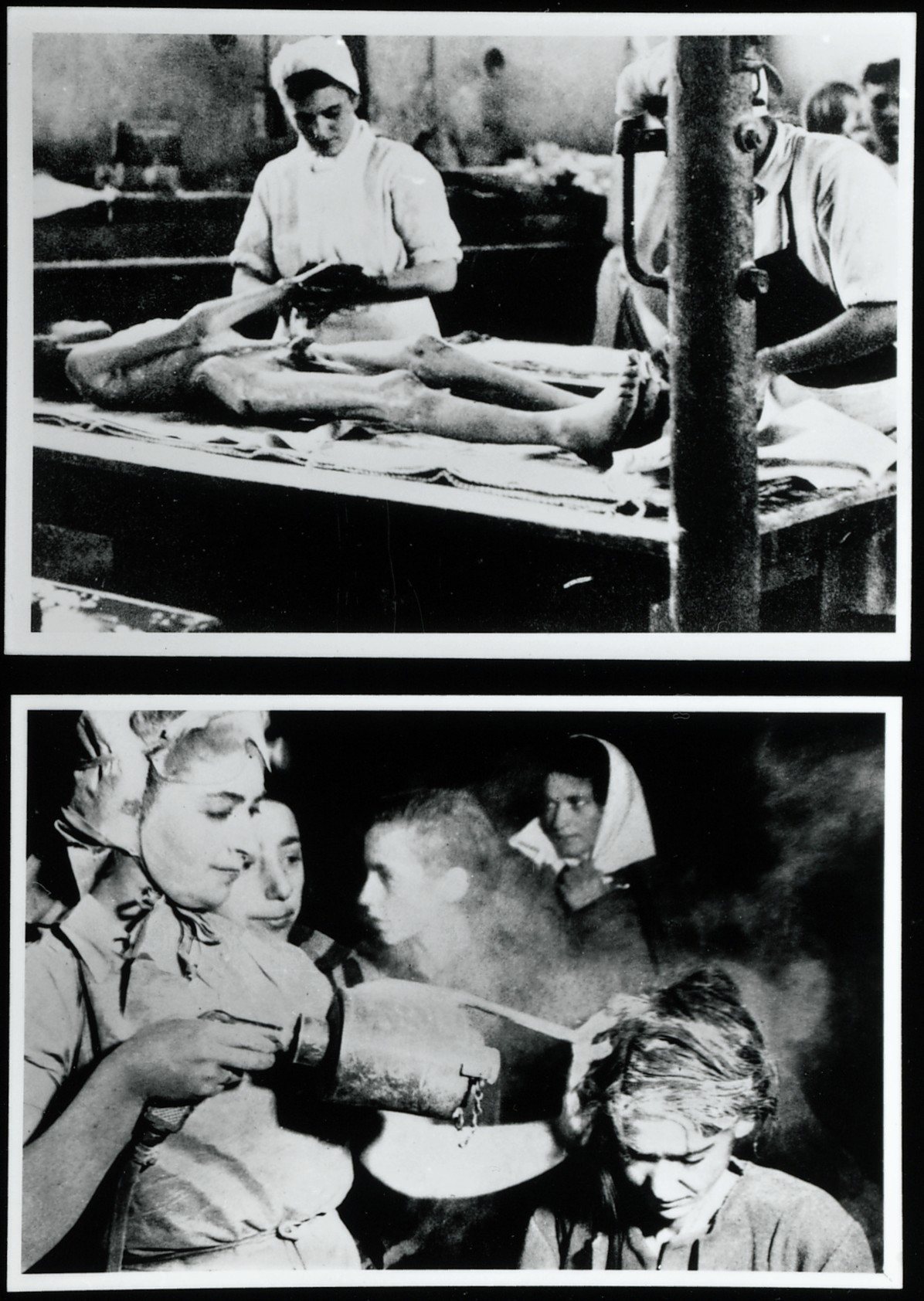
Belsen Concentration Camp. Human laundry

Initially, the role of the students was to take over one or two of the 200 huts each, with the responsibility of getting them cleaned (human laundry) and supervising the feeding of and fair distribution of food to the inmates. The association of intravenous feeding and Nazi activities rendered this kind of feeding inappropriate. An unpopular mixture known as the "Bengal mixture" was used for feeding. In addition to malnutrition and starvation, tuberculosis, typhus and cancrum oris were common, and later Wernicke's encephalopathy and pellagra.

Some of the challenges the students faced were reported by student Thomas Gibson, who disclosed the difficulties in caring for people when medicine and adequate nursing help was lacking, on the background of the dilemma of how “to explain to a Pole who speaks little French”, and how difficult it was “to give a course of sulphonamide to a Russian with erysipelas who only speaks Russian". The Lack of medical aid, equipment, drugs and hospital facilities meant improvising and making the best out of what was there.

Michael Hargrave, in his journal, described the human laundry, assembled in two adjacent stables where 17 tables were each surrounded by four German nurses, who washed the inmates, covered them in DDT and then wrapped them in clean towels before they were transported again. As a student running his hut, he marked whoever he felt appropriate to send there. The Hungarian aid would then porter them into an ambulance to be taken to the human laundry in Camp II.

On 14 May 1945, the 35 Casualty Clearing Station arrived and the remaining sick were moved to the German Military Hospital, later renamed the Glyn Hughes Hospital. It grew to accommodate 13 000 patients, and staff including the students, the British Red Cross and German medical staff.

The work by the students was significant in reducing the death rate from initially more than 500 a day to fewer than 100 a day by mid-May. On 20 May 1945, Camp 1 was destroyed and the students moved to Camp 2.

=== Life outside the camp ===
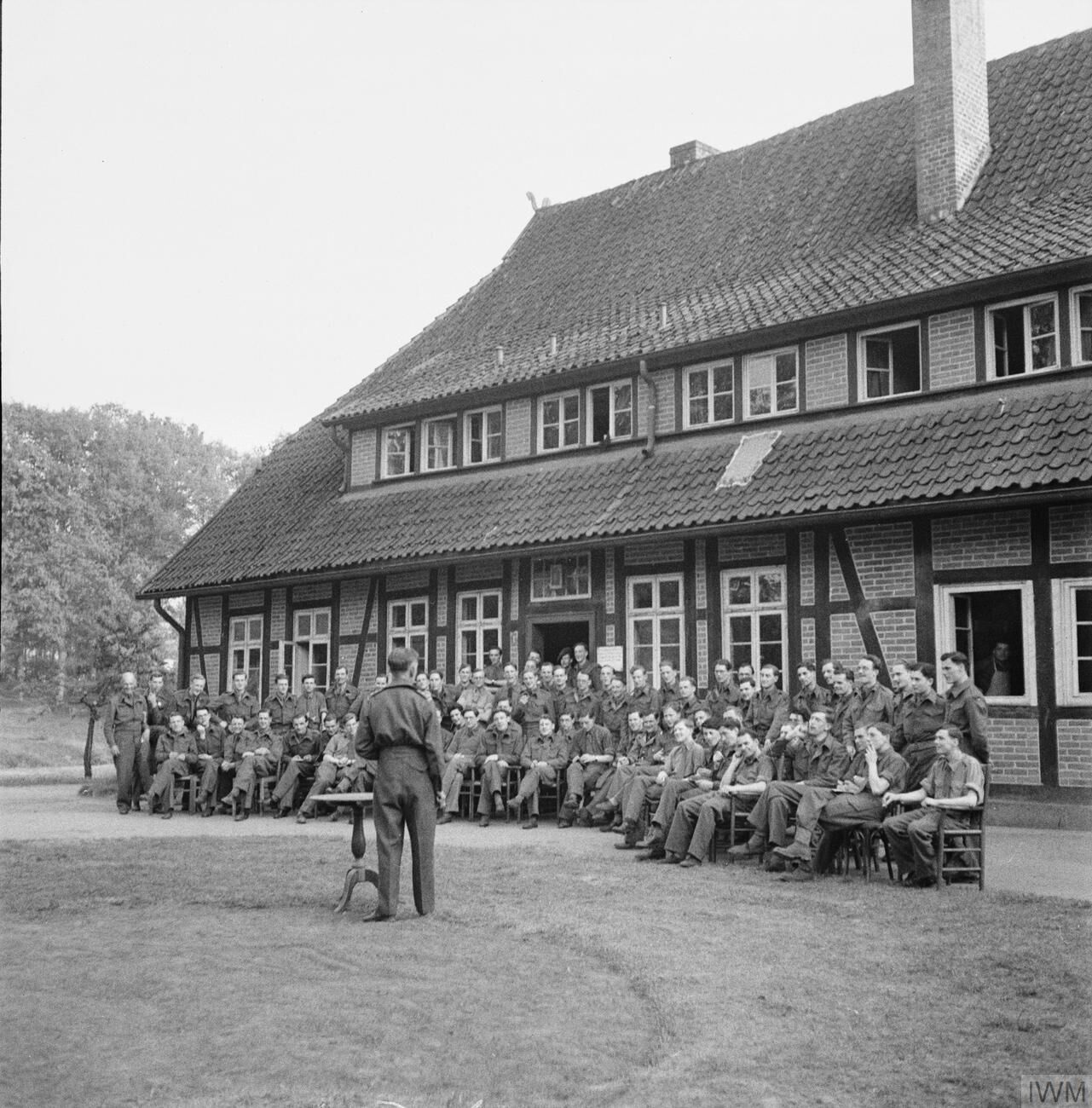
A group of students discuss some of the medical details experienced during the day with E. M. De Greff, British Red Cross Relief Officer and second-in-command of the medical students, at their daily evening conference.

They were issued with SS Panzer dot-camouflaged coats by Captain Walter Carton “Frosty” Winterbottom. Some Canadian airmen bought them cigarettes and chocolates. Each student was given twice the usual ration of rum every night. Theatre and cinema was provided for entertainment. Local RAF units gave wine and the Red Cross issued cigarettes to them. Later, a wireless and a dartboard became available.

=== Unwell students ===
Some students became unwell themselves with seven contracting typhus and two tuberculosis. Bart's student Andrew Dossetor was hospitalised with typhus, as too was John Hancock from The London, who was later cared for by Horace Evans. John Jenkins of Westminster medical school recovered from life-threatening tuberculosis. Westminster's tercentenary publication reports that four students died. However, there is no evidence that any died.

== Return to England ==
After a month at Belsen the students were relieved by Belgian medical students and returned to England. One of the students, Alex Paton, later described how on 29 May 1945 upon return, he landed at Croydon airport “with feelings that are too complicated to analyse at the moment”. One newspaper reported that year, that 21 cases of typhus were diagnosed in England, seven of which were volunteer medical students returning from Belsen.

Meiklejohn, who was responsible for administering the "starvation mixture", paid tribute to them and majors A. P. Prior and E. M. Griffin gave particular thanks to students D. G. A. Westbury and J. A. Turner from Guy's and J. Stephenson from St Thomas'.

== Later reflections ==
Several students later talked of their experiences at Belsen. On the bulldozing of bodies into mass graves, John Dixey later recounted;

It wasn't as totally horrifying as you might reasonably expect it to be because it was on such an enormous scale...If it had been several hundred bodies one might have been desperately upset and affected by it mentally and psychologically, at any rate. But no it was on such a huge scale it was rather like trying to count the stars. There were thousands and thousands of dead bodies and you couldn't really consider them to be your aunt or your mother or your brother or your father because there was just too many and they were being bulldozed into graves.

D. C. Bradford believed that they were able to cope with the situation, being as young as they were "it was I think that we were young and much more flexible and could take it in those days".

== Legacy ==
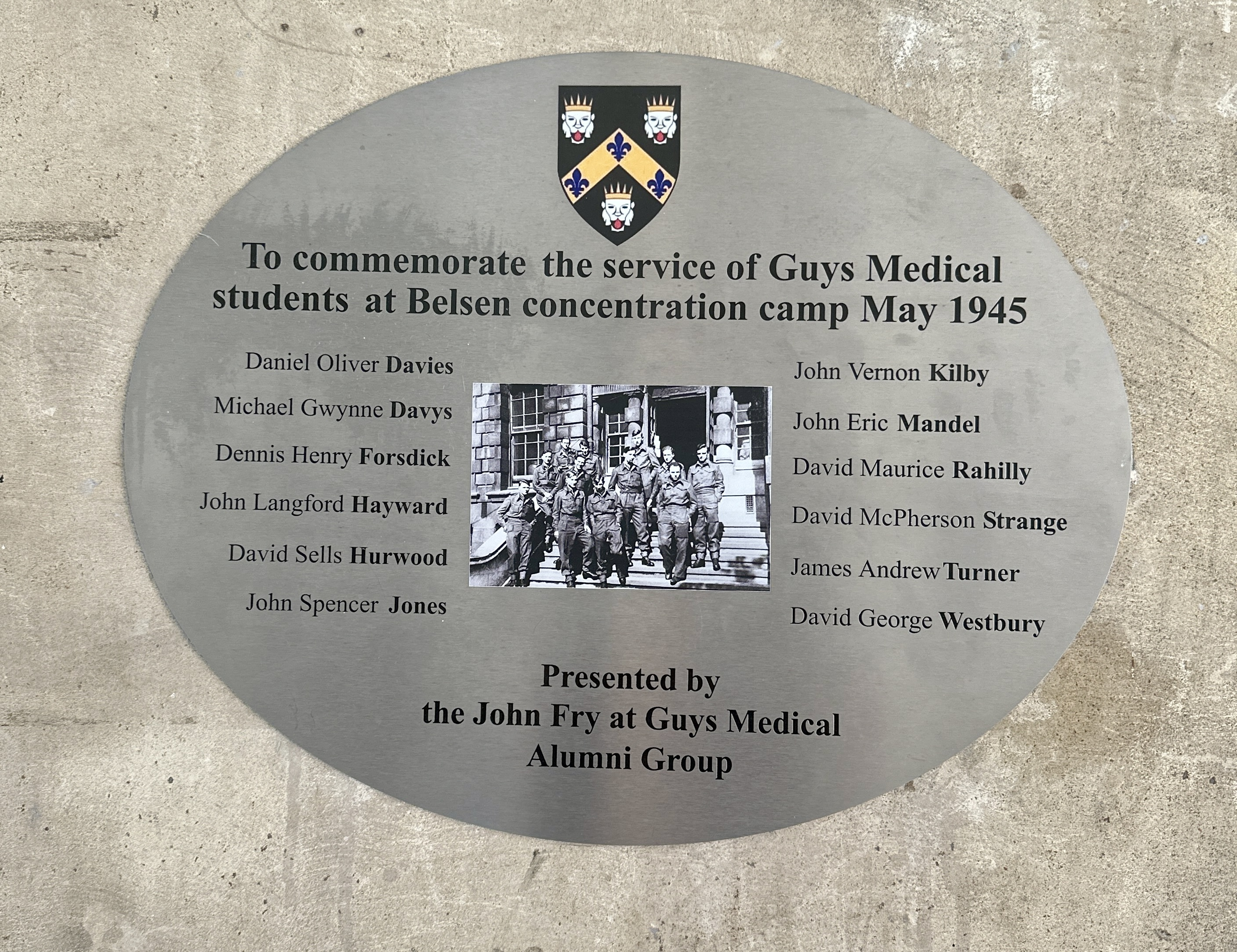
Plaque for Guy's Hospital students

Major A. P. Prior's papers and photographs of the students are kept in the Wellcome Collection. The Imperial War Museum holds an archive of a number of letters and diaries of the students. Some of their memoirs were used by historian Ben Shephard in his 2005 book After Daybreak: The Liberation of Belsen, 1945. In 2006, St Mary's student, Andrew B. Matthews' story was told in the Holocaust Studies: A Journal of Culture and History.

The operation was also portrayed in the 2007 feature-length drama titled The Relief of Belsen in which Alex Paton says "in my hut there were no deaths today, sir". Michael Hargrave's diary Bergen-Belsen 1945: A Medical Student's Journal was published in 2014.

In 2019, the Guy's alumni gave their John Fry lecture based on the students who were sent from Guy's Hospital.

== See also ==
- List of London medical students who assisted at Belsen
