= Arthur Rook (dermatologist) =

British dermatologist and author (1918–1991)

Arthur Rook FRCP
- Born: Arthur James Rook; 15 May 1918; Cobham, England
- Died: 30 July 1991 (aged 73)
- Medical career
- Profession: Physician
- Institutions: St Thomas' Hospital; Addenbrooke's Hospital, Cambridge
- Sub-specialties: Dermatology
- Notable works: Rook's Textbook of Dermatology

Arthur James Rook FRCP (15 May 1918 – 30 July 1991) was a leading British dermatologist and the principal author of Rook's Textbook of Dermatology (1968), known as "Rook's", which reached its ninth edition in 2016.

Rook was closely associated with Addenbrooke's Hospital, Cambridge, as a consultant dermatologist and later wrote the history of that hospital. He was the editor of the British Journal of Dermatology, president of the British Association of Dermatologists, and of the International Society of Tropical Dermatology, was elected an honorary fellow of the Royal Society of Medicine and became the president of the British Society for the History of Medicine.

Together with Ian Whimster, he wrote important articles on keratoacanthoma and blistering skin diseases.

== Early life ==
Arthur Rook was born on 15 May 1918, in Cobham, Surrey, the eldest child of Sir William Rook, who was knighted for his services as director of the sugar division at the Ministry of Food during the Second World War. Arthur Rook was educated at Charterhouse School, and then Trinity College, Cambridge, changing his mind at the last minute from studying languages to the study of medicine.

In 1932, he married Frances Jane Elizabeth Knott, daughter of the pathologist Frank A. Knott. They had three sons.

== Career ==
He studied medicine at St Thomas' Hospital, and after qualifying with a MB BChir in 1942 and graduating with an MD in 1950 with a thesis on keratoacanthoma and blistering eruptions, did three years National Service with the Royal Air Force, achieving the rank of squadron leader. Afterwards, he continued his dermatology training under Geoffrey Dowling and Hugh Wallace at St Thomas's and spent six months at St Louis Hospital in Paris. At the age of 32, he became a consultant dermatologist at Cardiff and in 1953 moved to Addenbrooke's Hospital, Cambridge, where he spent many years.

In 1953 with Eric Waddington, Rook wrote on bullous (blistering) skin diseases and believed that pemphigus was distinct from pemphigoid, supporting Lever who had at that time defined "bullous pemphigoid".

=== Keratoacanthoma ===
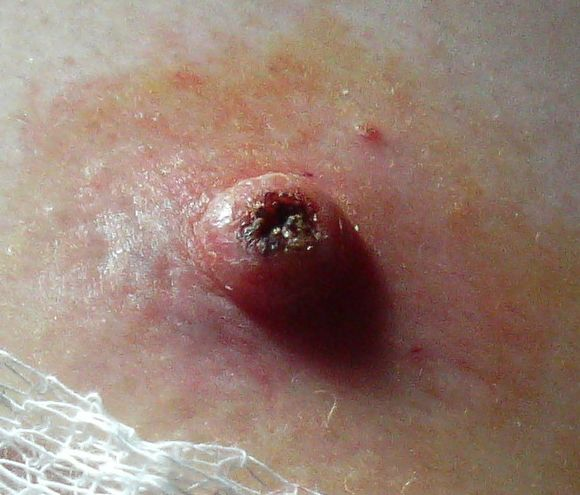
Keratoacanthoma

Described as a "crateriform ulcer of the face" by Sir Jonathan Hutchinson in 1889, it was then named "molluscum sebaceum" in 1936 by MacCormac and Scarf, before the term keratoacanthoma was coined by histopathologist Walter Freudenthal and then first formally used by Rook and the pathologist Ian Whimster in 1950. They noted that the condition lacked much attention despite being so common and indicated that despite the suggestion that keratoacanthoma was histologically malignant, they believed the lesion was clinically benign. Their findings of spontaneous regression when left untreated were later confirmed. Despite making a distinction between squamous-cell carcinoma and keratoacanthoma, subsequent reports of metastasis of keratoacanthomas, particularly in immunosuppressed people, have been made. In 1979, Rook and Whimster revised their work and mentioned that squamous cell carcinoma could develop in a keratoacanthoma. Despite being common lesions, much about keratoacanthomas remains a matter of debate. Although Rook and Whimster believed it to originate from the excretory ducts of sweat glands, other schools of thought have its origin in the hair follicle or the surface epithelium. In addition, although the distinct crater has been shown to be a hallmark of a keratoacanthoma, other benign or malignant skin lesions have also been shown to exhibit similar appearances.

=== Other roles ===
Rook was known for the ability to read in six languages and he absorbed the latest dermatological scholarship from around the world which he could quote with authority. He became a major figure in British dermatology and was editor of the British Journal of Dermatology from 1968 to 1974 In 1974 he became the president of the British Association of Dermatologists, and of the International Society of Tropical Dermatology. He was later elected an honorary fellow of the Royal Society of Medicine and also became the president of the British Society for the History of Medicine.

In 1968, the first edition of Rook's Textbook of Dermatology, colloquially known as Rook's, was published in two volumes by Blackwell Scientific Publications in Oxford. It was jointly written with Darrell Wilkinson and John Ebling. The ninth edition, still bearing his name, was published in 2016. His co-authored History of Addenbrooke's Hospital was published by Cambridge University Press in 1991, just prior to his death.

== Personal ==
He took a special interest in the history of medicine, ornithology, botany and gardening. Following retirement at the age of 59 in 1977, his last decade of life was troubled by Parkinson's disease but he was able to keep up his scientific work. He died in 1991, at the age of 73, less than a year after his wife.

== Selected publications ==
=== Books ===
- Rook's Textbook of Dermatology. Blackwell Scientific Publications, Oxford, 1968. (2 vols.) (With Darrell Wilkinson and John Ebling)
- Botanical Dermatology: Plants and Plant Products Injurous to the Skin. Greengrass. Vancouver, 1979. (With John Mitchell) ISBN 0889780471
- Diseases of the Hair and Scalp (Edited with Rodney Dawber) (2nd 1991)
- The History of Addenbrooke's Hospital, Cambridge. Cambridge University Press, Cambridge, 1991. ISBN 9780521405294

=== Papers ===
- Rook, A. J.; Whimster, I. W. (1950). "The Histological Diagnosis of Pemphigus". British Journal of Dermatology. 62 (11): 443–446. doi:10.1111/j.1365-2133.1950.tb14365.x. PMID 24538850. S2CID 20827820.
- Rook, Arthur; Waddington, Eric (1953). "Pemphigus and Pemphigoid". British Journal of Dermatology. 65 (12): 425–431. doi:10.1111/j.1365-2133.1953.tb13181.x. PMID 13115582. S2CID 28827099.
- Hjorth, N.; Osmundsen, P.; Rook, A. J.; Wilkinson, D. S.; Marks, R. (1968). "Peritoral Dermatitis". British Journal of Dermatology. 80 (5): 307–313. doi:10.1111/j.1365-2133.1968.tb12304.x. S2CID 221487399.
- Rook, A; Whimster, I (1979). "Keratoacanthoma--a thirty year retrospect". Br J Dermatol. 100 (1): 41–7. doi:10.1111/j.1365-2133.1979.tb03568.x. PMID 427012. S2CID 27373097.
