= Dedee Murrell =

British-born Australian dermatologist

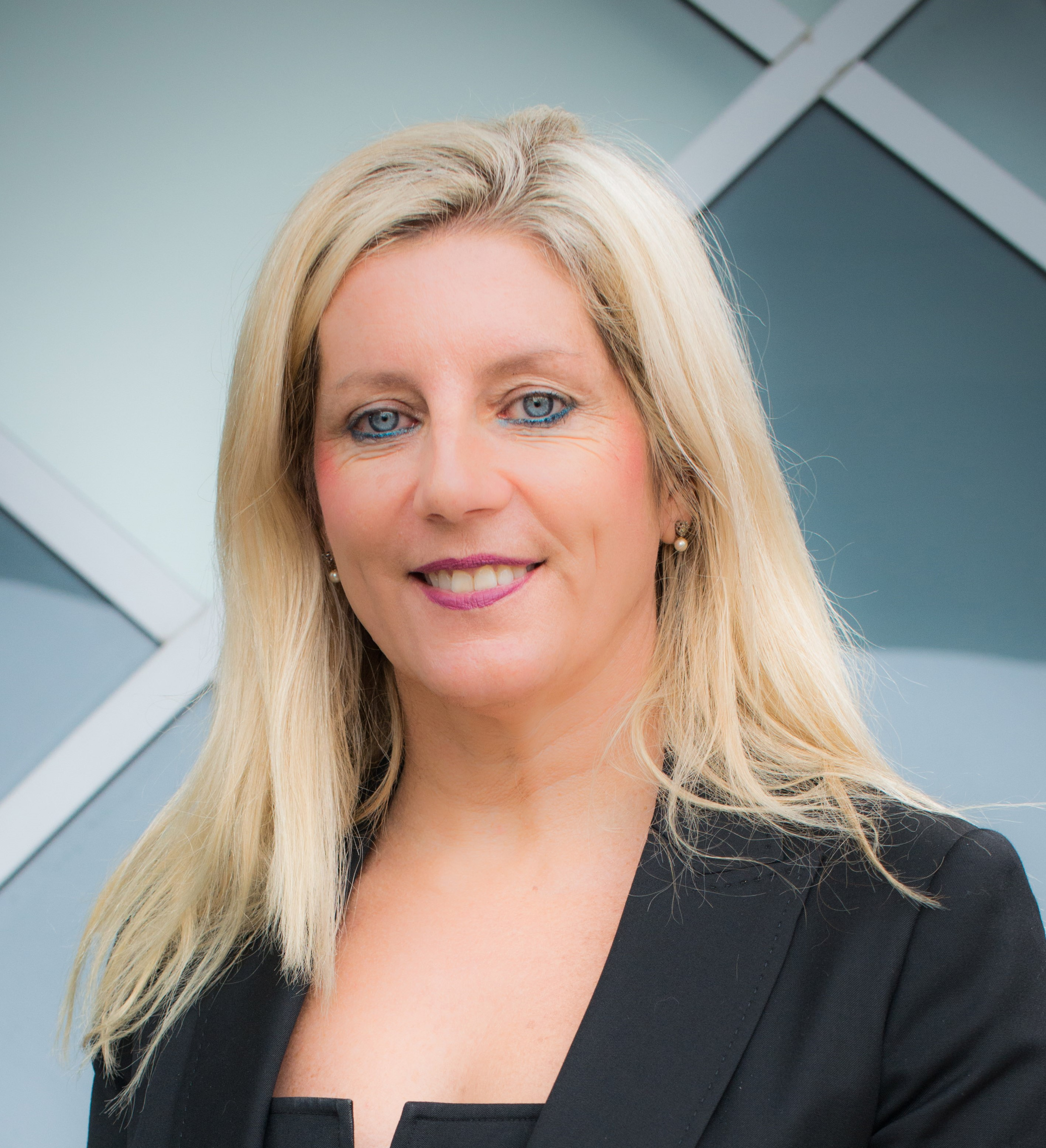
- Born: Dedee Frances Blackburn; Bradford, West Yorkshire, England
- Citizenship: Australian
- Education: University of Cambridge (Medical Sciences Tripos); University of Oxford, New College (BMBCh, 1987); University of Oxford (D.Sc., 2022)
- Occupations: Dermatologist, academic, clinical researcher
- Organizations: St George Hospital; University of New South Wales
- Known for: Research on epidermolysis bullosa and autoimmune blistering diseases

Dedee Frances Murrell (née Blackburn) is a British-born Australian dermatologist, academic, and clinical researcher. She specializes in medical dermatology with a focus on autoimmune and genetic blistering diseases and inflammatory skin conditions. She is the Head of the Department of Dermatology at St George Hospital in Sydney and a Conjoint Professor at the University of New South Wales (UNSW).

Her work includes the development of international consensus guidelines and outcome measures for these conditions. She leads the International Blistering Diseases Consensus Group.

== Early life and education ==
Murrell was born in Bradford, West Yorkshire, England.

She completed her clinical medical training at the University of Oxford, as a graduate member of New College, graduating with a BMBCh in 1987. During her studies, she was awarded the Renwick Vickers Prize in Dermatology.

== Career ==
Murrell completed her internship and basic medical training in the Oxford and Cambridge regions of the United Kingdom. In 1989, she moved to the United States to pursue internal medicine training at Duke University, North Carolina, followed by a dermatology residency at the University of North Carolina at Chapel Hill. During this period, she undertook an NIH-sponsored research year investigating the epitopes of the collagen VII antigen in epidermolysis bullosa acquisita (EBA).

She was awarded a Howard Hughes Postdoctoral Research Fellowship and an NIH Physician Scientist Award. She conducted research at the Cell Biology Sackler Institute at New York University and the Laboratory of Investigative Dermatology at Rockefeller University. Her work at NYU contributed to the identification of plakophilin as a component of desmosomes.

In 1996, Murrell relocated to Australia to take up a position at St George Hospital, University of New South Wales, in Sydney. She was appointed Head of the Dermatology Department in 2004. She established the National EB Diagnostic Lab and the first orphan disease registry for epidermolysis bullosa in Australia. She also founded Australia's first dedicated clinical trial centre for dermatology at St George Hospital.

Murrell was promoted to Professor of Dermatology at UNSW in 2008, becoming the first woman to hold a full professorship in dermatology in Australia. She was awarded a Doctorate of Science (D.Sc.) degree from the University of Oxford in 2022 for her work on outcome measures in blistering diseases.

For the Women's Dermatologic Society, she was the first international board member and served as the founding Co-Editor-in-Chief of the International Journal of Women's Dermatology from 2014 to 2022.

Murrell has edited the 10th edition of Rook's Textbook of Dermatology, the 6th and 7th editions of Treatment of Skin Disease, and a sole-edited textbook, Blistering Diseases. She has also served on the editorial boards of the Journal of the American Academy of Dermatology, JEADV, British Journal of Dermatology, JAMA Dermatology, and the Journal of Investigative Dermatology.

== Research and contributions ==
Murrell's research focuses on epidermolysis bullosa and autoimmune blistering diseases.

=== Epidermolysis bullosa (EB) ===
Her research in EB includes developing and validating the first disease-specific quality-of-life (QOLEB) and objective scoring (EBDASI) tools. She has contributed to identifying novel genetic variants causing EB and led the first randomized controlled trial of a cell therapy for the condition. She advocated for a national EB Dressing Scheme in Australia, which was granted permanent status by the government.

=== Autoimmune blistering diseases ===
Murrell helped in development of international consensus definitions and outcome measures for autoimmune blistering diseases. She co-led the Cochrane skin disease review on pemphigus treatments and, with Victoria Werth of the University of Pennsylvania. She also helped in creation of the Pemphigus Disease Area Index (PDAI), Bullous Pemphigoid Disease Area Index (BPDAI), and mucous membrane pemphigoid (MMP) scores in collaboration with international experts. She developed the first quality-of-life tools for these diseases: the Autoimmune Bullous Disease Quality of Life (ABQOL) and the Treatment of Autoimmune Bullous Disease Quality of Life (TABQOL) questionnaires.

== Awards and honours ==
Murrell has received the Maria Duran Medal from the International Society of Dermatology (2023), the Lifetime Achievement Award from the Medical Dermatology Society (2024), and the Rose Hirschler Award from the Women's Dermatologic Society (2024). She was inducted into the Dermatology Hall of Fame in 2022. She also received Everett C. Fox Award (1995), being an Honorary Member of the Croatian Academy of Medical Sciences, and receiving Fellowships from the Royal College of Physicians of Edinburgh and the American Dermatological Association.

== Selected works ==
- Murrell, D. F., et al. (2007). "Consensus definitions for the clinical assessment of pemphigus." Journal of the American Academy of Dermatology.
- Murrell, D. F., et al. (2008). "The Pemphigus Disease Area Index (PDAI): a new tool for the assessment of disease activity." Journal of Investigative Dermatology.
- Murrell, D. F., et al. (2022). "Development and validation of the Autoimmune Bullous Disease Quality of Life (ABQOL) questionnaire." British Journal of Dermatology.
- Frew, J., et al. "Quality of life evaluation in epidermolysis bullosa (EB) through the development of the QOLEB questionnaire: an EB-specific quality of life instrument." British Journal of Dermatology.
- Murrell, D. F., et al. "Definitions and outcome measures for bullous pemphigoid: Recommendations by an international panel of experts." Journal of the American Academy of Dermatology.
