= Juvenile plantar dermatosis =

- Other names: Atopic winter feet, Dermatitis plantaris sicca, Forefoot dermatitis, Moon-boot foot syndrome, and Sweaty sock dermatitis
- The 8-year-old child has juvenile plantar dermatosis on their feet.
- Specialty: Dermatology

Juvenile plantar dermatosis is a condition usually seen in children between the ages of 3 and 14, and involves the cracking and peeling of weight bearing areas of the soles of the feet.

One of the earliest descriptions was made by British dermatologist Darrell Wilkinson.

== Signs and symptoms ==
The anterior portion of the sole and the plantar surfaces of the toes are the areas most commonly impacted. The dorsal surface of the toes, the heels, and the fingertips are other occasionally afflicted locations. The spared web gaps between the toes is a defining trait of juvenile plantar dermatosis. The symptoms of a lesion are bright, red, dry spots. Scaling and fissuring may be visible in chronic situations.

== Causes ==
It is unclear exactly what causes juvenile plantar dermatosis (JPD) and how it develops. JPD is frequently observed in "atopic" children, or those with hay fever, asthma, atopic dermatitis, or eczema. The warm summertime temperatures can make it worse.

== Treatment ==
JPD does not have a particular treatment. Avoiding too much moisture by wearing breathable shoes and avoiding shoes altogether are examples of management techniques. This lessens the effects of occlusion and friction, which encourage cutaneous peeling and cracking, and may assist to decrease perspiration. While they are often used to reduce acute inflammation, topical corticosteroids do not appear to have a direct impact on the etiology. Recurrence is therefore frequent after corticosteroid medication is stopped.

== Epidemiology ==
Juvenile plantar dermatosis (JPD) affects children aged 3 to 15, but is more commonly observed in boys aged 4 to 8.

== See also ==
- Sulzberger–Garbe syndrome
- List of cutaneous conditions
