= Nummular =

Nummular means something coin-shaped, such as:

- Nummular dermatitis
- Nummular psoriasis
