= Rook's Textbook of Dermatology =

Leading dermatology textbook by Wiley; its ninth edition was published in 2016

- 9th edition, 2016
- Language: English
- Subject: Dermatology
- Genre: Medicine
- Publisher: Blackwell, Wiley
- Publication date: 1968 (1st edition); 2023 (10th edition)
- Publication place: United Kingdom
- Media type: Two volumes (1st edition); Four volumes (10th edition)

Rook's Textbook of Dermatology is a leading textbook of dermatology published by Wiley. The ninth edition was published in 2016.

== History ==
The first edition of Rook's was published in two volumes by Blackwell Scientific Publications in Oxford in 1968. It was jointly edited by Arthur Rook, Darrell Wilkinson and John Ebling. Rook was the editor of the British Journal of Dermatology from 1968 to 1974 a dermatologist at Addenbrooke's Hospital, Cambridge, and a medical historian.

An online version was introduced for the eighth edition in 2010.

The ninth edition in four volumes was published by Wiley in 2016.
