= Nutritional deficiency eczema =

- Specialty: Dermatology

Nutritional deficiency eczema is a pattern of eczema with localized, thickened, scaling patches that have some characteristics of nummular eczema, seborrheic dermatitis, and neurodermatitis that may be seen in alcoholics. It is usually caused due to the deficiency of vitamin A and vitamin D

== See also ==
- Skin lesion
