= Lucy Beall Lott =

American-British academic, activist and model (born 1998)

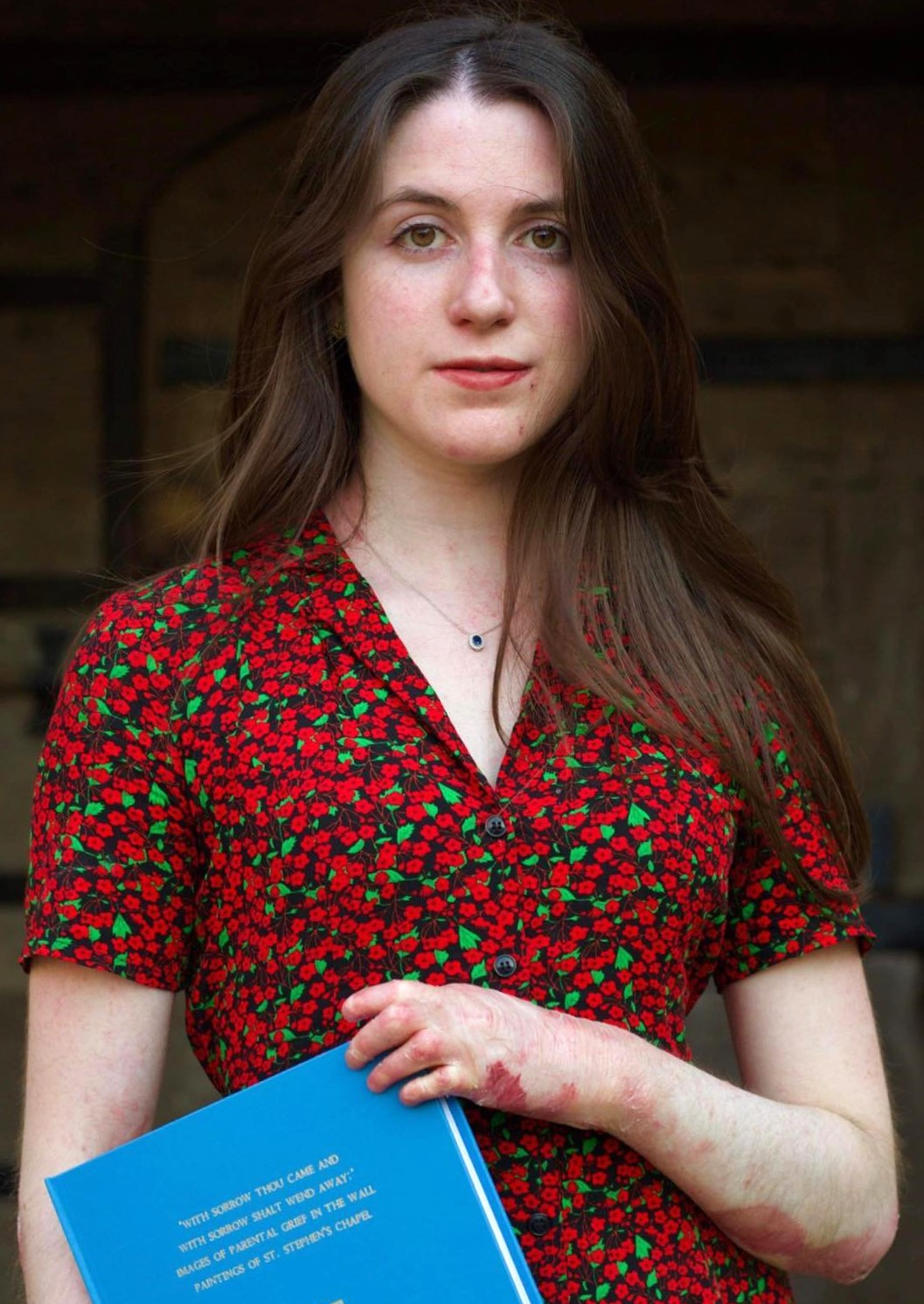
- Beall in 2023 with University of Cambridge MPhil dissertation
- Born: 1998 (age 27–28); Austin, Texas, US
- Education: University of St Andrews (BA, joint degree); Courtauld Institute of Art (MA); Gonville and Caius College, Cambridge (MPhil)
- Occupations: Academic; activist; model
- Known for: Epidermolysis bullosa activism and modeling
- Partner: Douglas Boler (2017–present)
- Website: instagram.com/lucy_bealll/

Lucy Margaret Beall Lott (born 1998) is an American-British academic, activist, and model with epidermolysis bullosa (EB).

EB is a rare terminal illness also called "butterfly skin" due to the skin fragility it causes. With it, even slight friction causes open wounds and blisters resembling severe burns, both on the outer skin and inside the throat. There is no cure, only supportive treatment.

Beall was born in Texas and raised in a small town by a single mother. She was expected to die in infancy, then by the age of 18. When she exceeded her life expectancy she moved to Britain to study medieval art history, saying that the only thing her disease could not stop her from doing was learning. She earned a joint bachelor's degree from the University of St Andrews, two master's degrees from the University of London and University of Cambridge, and is pursuing a doctorate.

Beall's EB activism began at age 17, with writing to raise awareness for her condition. As an adult, she became an ambassador for DEBRA UK, and has participated in other EB charities. She started modeling in a body positive fashion show at university, then posting photographs on her Instagram account, which led to her appearing in pictorials in Vogue Italia and Cosmopolitan UK, and walking in London Fashion Week.

== Early life and epidermolysis bullosa ==
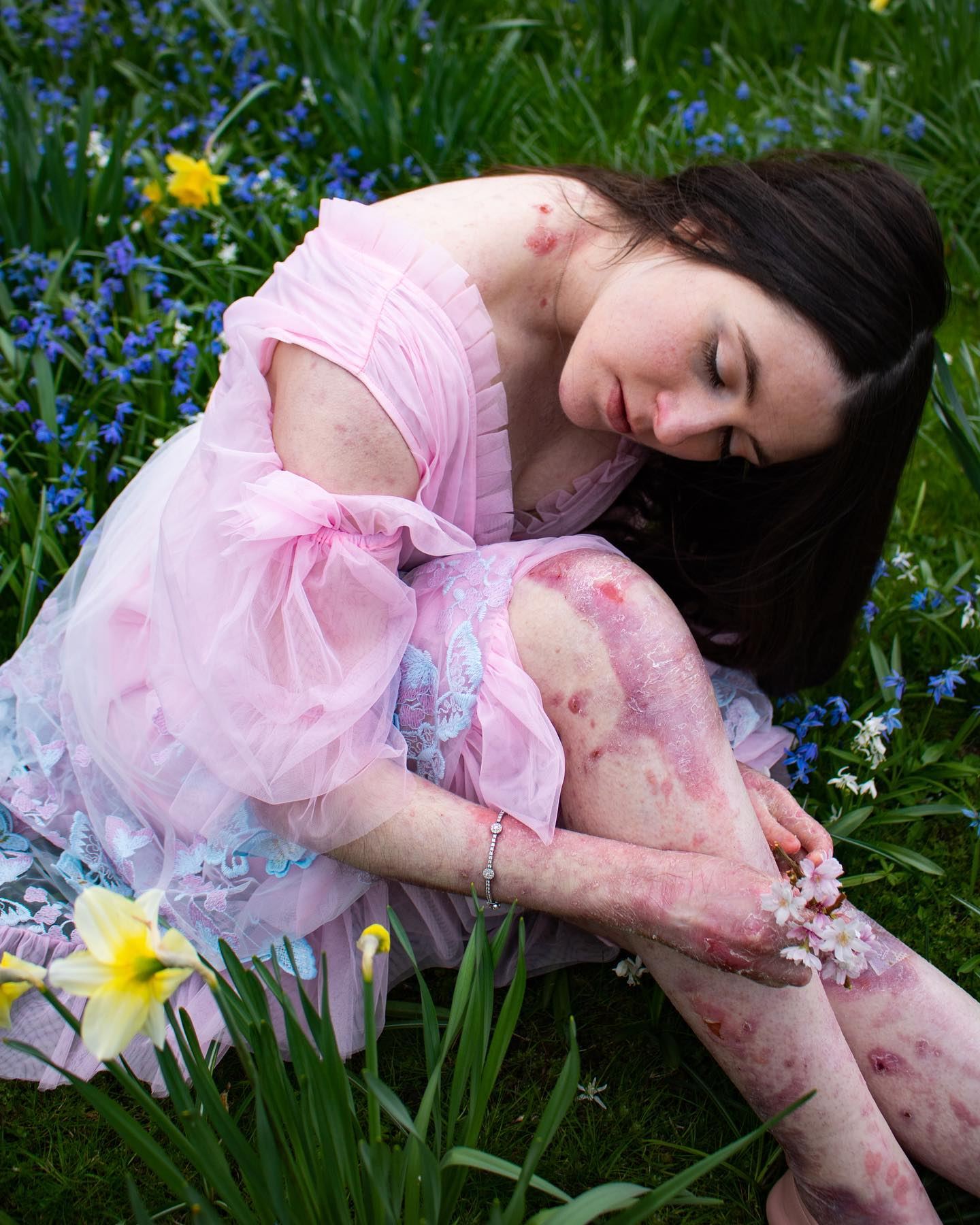
Beall in 2021

Lucy Margaret Beall Lott was born in Austin, Texas, in 1998. She is the youngest of three siblings, with a brother and sister. Her mother, Elizabeth Beall, a photographer and designer, raised them as a single parent. Her maternal grandfather was Royce Beall, who headed the Bealls department store chain from 1977 to 1981. Lott is her legal last name, but she prefers Beall to honor her mother and mother's family who raised her.

Beall was born with epidermolysis bullosa (EB), specifically recessive dystrophic epidermolysis bullosa (RDEB), also known as "butterfly skin", a lack of collagen VII, a protein that helps anchor the skin. Without it, even slight friction causes open wounds and blisters resembling severe burns on her body and inside her throat; on a normal day she can have multiple open wounds on her body. She has a relatively mild case: she can walk, run, does not need a feeding tube, and has all her hair, fingers, and toes, which is not the case for most adults with RDEB. EB is a rare condition affecting an estimated 500,000 people worldwide. There is no known cure; treatments are mainly supportive, dealing with the symptoms and wounds.

When Beall was born, nurses realized something was wrong when they would remove a monitor from her skin and the skin would come away with it. Doctors expected her to die in infancy. A team of epidermolysis bullosa specialists in Denver treated her when she was two years old; they said her condition was terminal and said she would be lucky to live to 18. "Terminal" and the name of her disease were among the first words she learned, at about the same time she learned her name.

In 2003, after being treated in Denver, Beall and her mother moved to the small town of Fredericksburg, Texas, where her mother's family lived. She says she had a happy childhood. She grew up on a ranch, and attended Heritage School, a private Christian school. Her classmates and teachers accepted her, as did her family, even though she needed to be covered in bandages to protect her fragile skin. Beall loved school, and was upset when her treatments made her miss out on it. She considered Latin classes exciting. Her mother, Liz, insisted she live as normal a life as possible, playing outside and doing sports, believing that feeling like children her own age was worth any trauma to her skin. She wore the bandages until she was 14 years old. From 2013, she attended Providence Hall in Fredericksburg, a small school founded by her mother; her class had five students in it.

Beall only fully realized how different she was when she moved with her mother to Santa Fe, New Mexico, when she was 17. She was taking her dog to the veterinarian's office where a woman said that she looked as if she had been mauled by a gorilla. Beall lied that she had been in a motorcycle accident, but afterwards went to her car and cried.

Beall had about a dozen surgeries as a teenager for throat strictures caused by EB blisters on the throat lining. In 2016, her throat narrowing became critical. She lost weight until she weighed less than 100 pounds (45 kg), could not breathe, and was spitting up blood. She graduated high school early so she could move back to Denver for a series of surgeries over months to save her life. An experimental surgery using a long narrow balloon to break open the stricture was able to open her throat and she was released early. She said she was the healthiest she had been since she was 13.

When she reached 18 years of age, Beall had exceeded her projected life expectancy, and her doctors were calling her "the girl who lived". Many of the friends with RDEB she grew up with died as teenagers; she was one of the few people that she knew with her condition to make it to university. But Beall says that she does not feel as if she were living on borrowed time. She says that only God can decide when someone is terminal, and that she is not afraid. Instead she says she wakes up thankful every day, and wants to do as much as she possibly can, because she does not know how long her health will last. She says the only thing EB can not limit for her is her ability to learn; if it were up to her, she would go to school forever.

== UK university studies ==
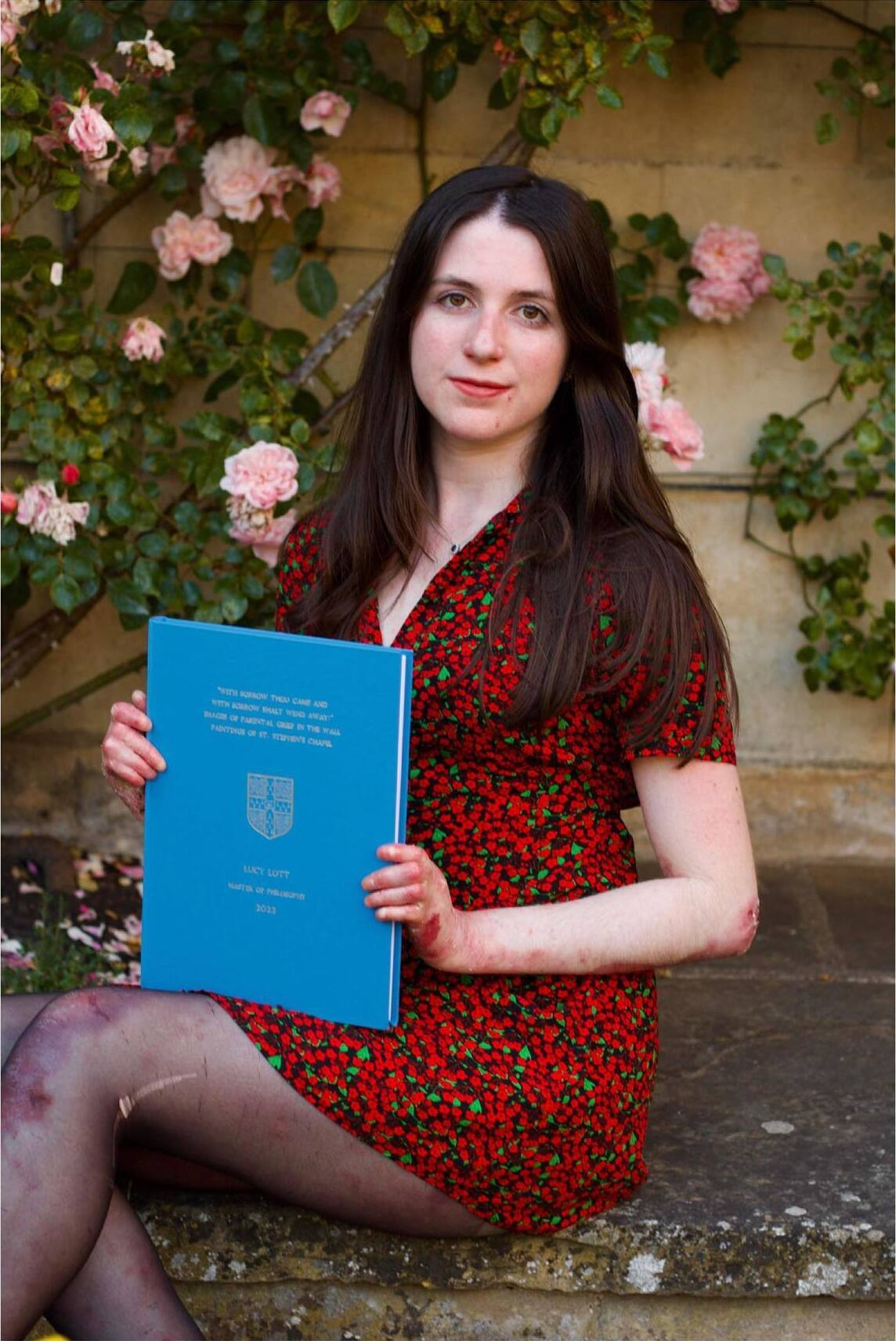
Beall with her Gonville & Caius Master of Philosophy dissertation, 2023

Beall went to London to study the fall she turned 18. She studied for a year at Sotheby's Institute of Art and Birkbeck College, University of London, before moving on to the University of St Andrews in Scotland. She has not lived in the United States since. At St Andrews, she did a joint degree in History of Art and Classics, specializing in early medieval art and Roman British archaeology. Her research showed that her ancestors were married in a St Andrews chapel, and buried in the St Andrews cemetery.

In 2019 her right hand gradually lost mobility, in a process called "mittening" in which scar tissue pulled her fingers and thumb into her palm. She wrote a 10,000-word and a 6,000-word dissertation with her little finger fused to her ring finger due to aggressive scar tissue. She got surgery to stretch her fingers open in the summer of 2019. A doctor forgot to give her pain medication and she could feel every tendon and every stitch from her skin graft, but when her cast was removed, she resolved not to take the feeling of touch for granted again. She credits DEBRA UK for help getting and paying for the surgery. In 2020, Beall was not able to get physical therapy for her hand due to the COVID-19 pandemic. She was considered particularly vulnerable to the pandemic, so was unable to travel, or even leave her house; she had to have her bandages and medications delivered.

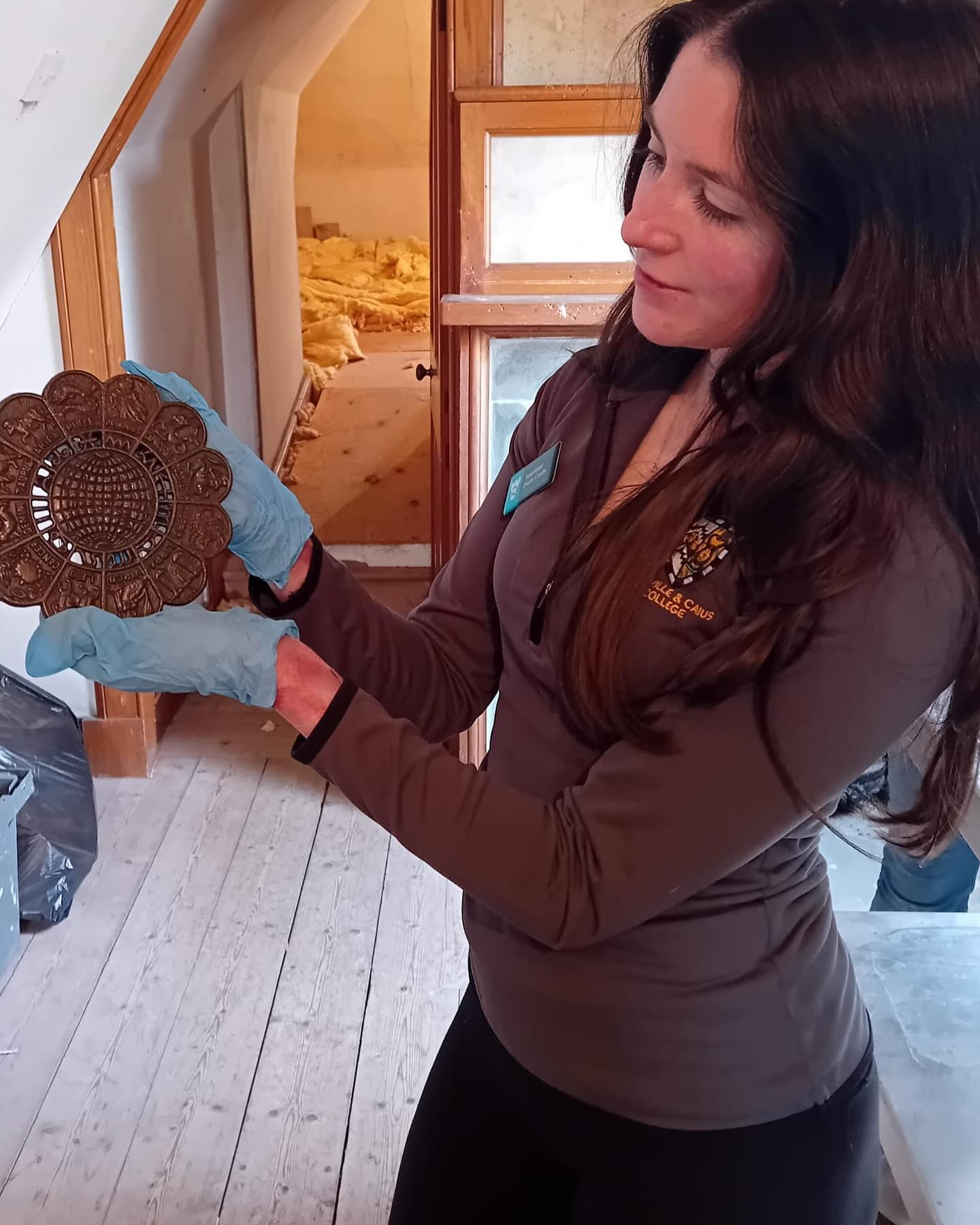
Beall holds an artifact in the attic of Drum Castle, Scotland, in 2024

Beall graduated from St Andrews at the top of her class in 2021. She received a Master of Arts degree from the London University Courtauld Institute of Art in the summer of 2022. She attended Gonville and Caius College, Cambridge to earn a Master of Philosophy in 2023, which she particularly valued as this was the college for which the disabled physicist Stephen Hawking was known. She believes she is the first person with RDEB to complete a degree from Oxbridge. Her master's dissertation was on images of parental grief in the wall paintings of St Stephen's Chapel. She gave a lecture on the subject to the Society of Antiquaries of London in November 2023.

In December 2023, Beall helped organize a masquerade at Sir John Soane's Museum for the Young Friends of Save Venice Inc. art preservation charity. In 2025 Beall was on the Young Friends of Save Venice steering committee.

After graduating University of Cambridge, Beall returned to the University of St Andrews to seek her PhD in Art History. Her work included cataloguing the collection at Drum Castle. She was elected to the Royal Historical Society in May 2024. She investigated and wrote about the statues on Henry V's chantry chapel in Westminster Abbey in September 2025.

When people ask Beall what she means to do with her degrees, sometimes her answer is to become an art history professor, and other times that she did not think she would be alive that long.

== Activism ==
After the incident in the Santa Fe veterinarian's office, Beall began writing to raise awareness about her condition. Her first article was published in the Huffington Post before she turned 18. In it, she wrote that she was proud of her scars, because each was a visible sign of her strength, a reminder that she survived instead of dying as she was diagnosed. She said she wanted people who googled EB to be able to see something positive, rather than only the worst. Her writing appeared in multiple other sources starting with the US New York Post, and the UK Daily Mail. In June 2019, Beall gave a TEDx talk at the University of St Andrews about her visible disability.

Since 2020, Beall has been an ambassador for DEBRA UK, raising awareness of EB for the medical charity. That year Beall was interviewed by The Brothers Trust, the charitable organization of the family of actor Tom Holland. Also in 2020, Beall joined Olivia Vedder and the Epidermolysis Bullosa Research Partnership to create "Beauty is Not Rare", a social media campaign celebrating atypical bodies.

Besides DEBRA UK and the EB Research Partnership, Beall participates in her family foundation, the Beall Family Endowed Fund for EB, launched in 2014. By 2022, Beall's speaking had raised $100,000 for EB research.

In March 2023 Beall was interviewed by Nana Akua of GB News about RDEB and her modeling career. In June 2023 she appeared in the British Skin Foundation and ITN series Skin: Below the Surface, anchored by British television presenter Louise Minchin; her episode also featured DEBRA president Simon Weston. In December 2023, she spoke for DEBRA UK at the Scottish Parliament.

== Modeling ==
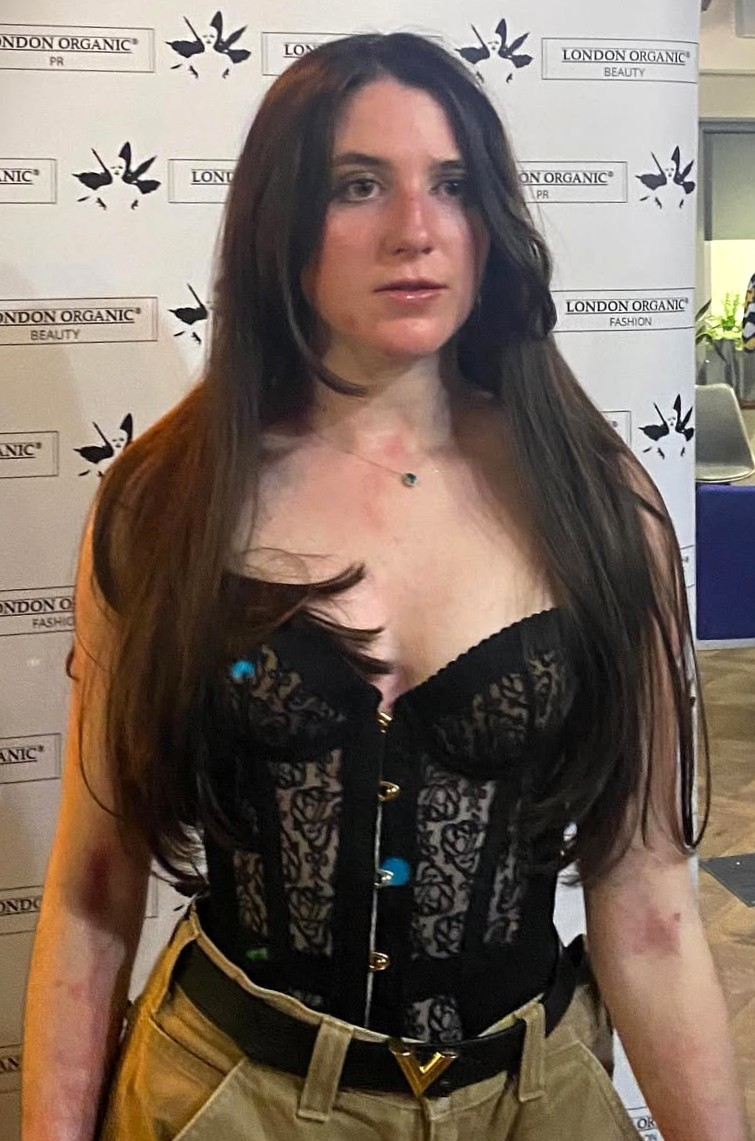
Beall modeling Lautoka Vintage at London Fashion Week 2021

In 2017, during her first year at University of St Andrews, Beall modeled lingerie in a student-run body positive fashion show called "Label", and says she began to view her body as something to be celebrated. On 31 August 2019, Beall walked in a corset at The Real Catwalk at Trafalgar Square in London, which was covered by Glamour UK. She said she wanted to shatter taboos, she wanted people to look at her body and say that there was nothing wrong with it.

Beall became more open about posting photos showing her scars on her Instagram in 2019, which gained her 20,000 followers within a year, and led to attention from a modeling agency, magazines, and brands. In 2020, she appeared in two lingerie photoshoots and accompanying interviews in the fashion magazine Vogue Italia. She said that she wished she could go back and to tell her teenage self to be thankful for her appearance which would one day let her appear in Vogue.

After the founder of the "Label" fashion show graduated St Andrews, taking the show with her, in 2020 Beall co-founded the "Bare Revolution" body-positive university fashion show only to have it meet the COVID-19 pandemic lockdown. In December 2020, Dylan Eggleston, a Fredericksburg friend of Beall's since the Heritage School, won the 2021 Fashion Scholarship Fund scholarship for her presentation that imagined clothing for EB sufferers.

In September 2021, Beall walked the runways for three fashion brands at London Fashion Week: Again & Again, Lautoka Vintage, and Agent Provocateur. In February 2022, she walked London Fashion Week again, for three different brands: Noe dresses, Seref, and Tracy Toulouse's Swirling Wind. In May 2022, she modeled Savage X Fenty lingerie in a photo shoot in the magazine Cosmopolitan UK.

== Personal life ==
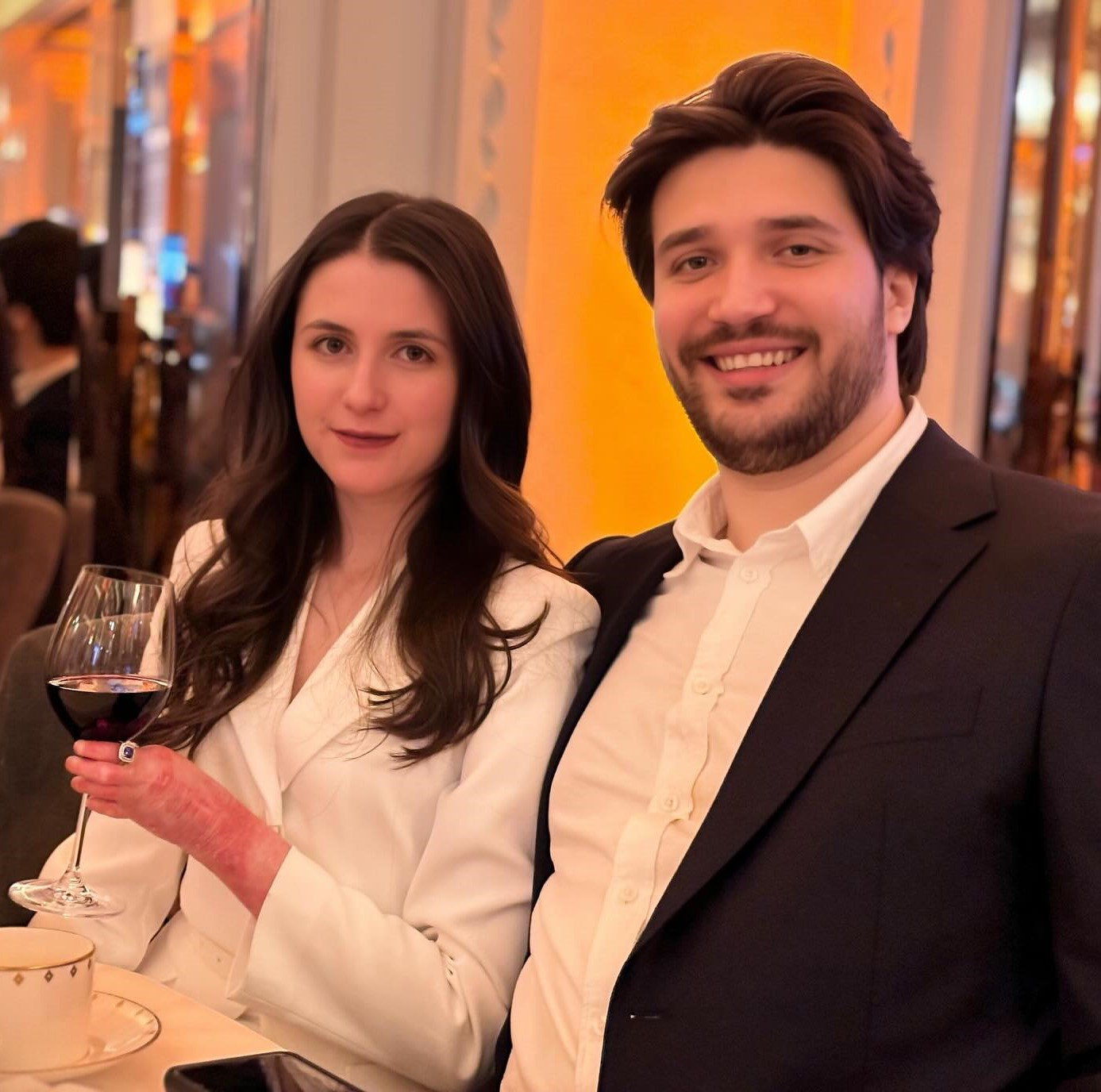
Beall with her partner Douglas Boler, at DEBRA and Brothers' Trust charity event in 2024

Despite her condition, Beall hikes, snowboards, and socialises with friends.

Beall met her boyfriend, Douglas Boler, in her first week at the University of St Andrews in 2017. He earned his BSc in geology at St Andrews in 2021, then moved with her to the University of Cambridge where they both completed their master's degrees, and he played for the Cambridge University Pythons American football club. He returned with her to St Andrews for her PhD. They have a medical assistance dog named Saxon.
