= Ian Whimster =

English dermatologist (1923–1979)

Ian Whimster MRCPath
- Born: Ian Wesley Whimster; 3 September 1923; Bath, Somerset, England
- Died: 18 January 1979 (aged 55); London, England
- Occupation: Pathologist
- Medical career
- Institutions: St Thomas' Hospital
- Sub-specialties: Dermatology histopathology

Ian Wesley Whimster MRCPath (3 September 1923 – 18 January 1979) was a reader of dermatology histopathology at St Thomas' Hospital, London. He gained international recognition for his study of comparative anatomy and experiments with reptiles, particularly observing their colour patterns in relation to their nerve supply. He was part of the medical student team that went into Bergen-Belsen concentration camp in 1945, after it was liberated by British troops. On return, he made numerous contributions to dermatology, including the definition of keratoacanthoma, the distinction between pemphigus and pemphigoid and descriptions of melanocytes and melanoma. He died in a road traffic accident at the age of 55.

== Early life ==
Ian Whimster was born in 1923. He was educated at Lancing College, followed by Clare College, Cambridge, before gaining admission to St Thomas' Hospital medical school and then completing his MB in 1946. His early appointments were at St Thomas's where he also developed his interest in dermatology.

== Career ==
During his junior years, Whimster was part of the medical student team that went into Bergen-Belsen concentration camp in 1945, after it was liberated by British troops. With the encouragement and support from Geoffrey Dowling, he developed an interest in the skin and Whimster soon became closely associated with Arthur Rook, working on the histopathology of keratoacanthoma and the distinction between the bullous diseases pemphigoid and pemphigus.

Whimster gained international recognition for his work on comparative anatomy and experiments with reptiles, particularly observing their colour patterns in relation to their nerve supply. His observations on humans and reptiles formed the basis of his classic papers on spottiness. He became adept at breeding small reptiles for his experiments and devoted to their care.

His statement that "some invisible intersegmental boundaries, whose existence we have been taught to expect by comparative anatomy and embryology, are only revealed by disease" stemmed from Whimster's interest in the causes of linear or sharply demarcated rashes unexplained by external stimuli.

Whimster's observations in the 1950s, of increased capillary loops next to a venous ulcer, as examined under the microscope, later facilitated the correlation between venous hypertension and venous ulceration.

Whimster was also a leading authority on the melanocyte and an expert in melanoma. In addition, he collaborated with Hugh Wallace and studied vulval leukoplakia.

Whimster often suffered from severe depression which caused his research to stall. One of his obituary writers commented on the lasting impression that his experience at Belsen had left on him.

== Death and legacy ==
Whimster died in a road traffic accident on 18 January 1979 at the age of 55.

Since 1984, the British Association of Dermatologists has awarded the Whimster prize, which is presented every three years.

== Selected publications ==
- Whimster, IW (1963). "Comparative Study of the Mosaic-Like Structure of the Skin and ITS Relation to Cutaneous Innervation". Arch Belg Dermatol Syphiligr. 19: 353–60. PMID 14176953.
- Whimster, IW (1976). "Proceedings: Nerve supply as a stimulator of the growth of tissues, including skin". Br J Dermatol. 95 Suppl 14: 9. doi:10.1111/j.1365-2133.1976.tb07877.x. PMID 1276077. S2CID 27676924.
- Whimster, IW (1978). "Nerve supply as a stimulator of the growth of tissues including skin: I. Human evidence". Clinical and Experimental Dermatology. 3 (3): 221–40. doi:10.1111/j.1365-2230.1978.tb01493.x. PMID 737869. S2CID 12286207.
- Whimster, IW (1978). "Nerve supply as a stimulator of the growth of tissues including skin. II. Animal evidence". Clinical and Experimental Dermatology. 3 (4): 389–410. doi:10.1111/j.1365-2230.1978.tb01518.x. PMID 737883. S2CID 43354455.
- Rook, A; Whimster, I (1979). "Keratoacanthoma--a thirty year retrospect". Br J Dermatol. 100 (1): 41–7. doi:10.1111/j.1365-2133.1979.tb03568.x. PMID 427012. S2CID 27373097.
