= Walter Freudenthal =

German-Jewish dermatologist

- Born: 6 May 1893; Breslau, German Empire
- Died: 27 March 1952 (aged 58); London, United Kingdom
- Education: Friedrich-Wilhelms University
- Occupations: Dermatologist, dermatopathologist
- Known for: Description of "keratoma senile", 1926; Coining of keratoacanthoma, 1940s
- Medical career
- Profession: Pathologist
- Institutions: Friedrich-Wilhelms University; University College Hospital
- Sub-specialties: Dermatology
- Research: Histopathology of skin

Walter Freudenthal (6 May 1893 – 27 March 1952) was a German-Jewish dermatologist who gave the earliest clear histopathological description of keratoma senile (actinic keratosis) in 1926 in Breslau. In 1933, he moved to London to escape the Nazi regime and worked as a dermatopathologist at University College Hospital (UCH) in London where he coined the term keratoacanthoma in the 1940s.

He worked with dermatologist Geoffrey Barrow Dowling on the connection between dermatomyositis and scleroderma and was later appointed to the first readership in dermatological histology by London University.

In addition to lecturing, demonstrating specimens at the Royal Society of Medicine and postgraduate training, Freudenthal wrote many papers on his histopathological findings, and chapters in dermatology textbooks.

== Early life ==
Walter Freudenthal was born on 6 May 1893 in Breslau (now Wrocław, Poland) in the Province of Silesia of the German Empire, to the Jewish physician Dr. Samuel Freudenthal (1864–1907) and Rosa Freudenthal née Graetzer (1870–1951). He was the eldest son, and he had a younger brother Erich. In 1913 he began to study medicine in Geneva, but this was interrupted by the First World War. Returning to Breslau in 1919, he resumed his medical education and completed it at the clinic of the Friedrich-Wilhelms University (now the University of Wrocław), graduating in 1920.

== Early career ==
While working in the histopathology laboratory and being in charge of the male ward in the outpatient clinic, he became a university lecturer and then full professor. He became concerned that existing skin treatments were inadequate and started to work with a pharmacist to educate himself on the chemical content of various ointments and creams. At the same time, he lectured on sexually transmitted diseases, dermatohistopathology and related topics.

He was particularly influenced by Breslau's chair of dermatology Josef Jadassohn, and was his assistant from 1920 to 1933 at the Breslau University. He also worked alongside other well-known names in the field of dermatology, such as W. N. Goldsmith, Max Jessner and Rudolph L. Mayer. After receiving his MD in 1922, he became a privatdozent in 1929.

His most significant works were written at Breslau. He examined 14 biopsy specimens of lesions taken from the skin of either the back of the hands or the upper face from 13 people aged between 34 and 76. He gave the earliest histopathological definition of these lesions, which he called keratoma senile (actinic keratosis), and distinguished them from verruca senilis (seborrheic keratosis). The description appeared in the Archiv für Dermatologie und Syphilis in 1926 and was regarded by his colleagues as important. He also proposed that keratoma senile might be caused by sunlight.

== University College Hospital ==
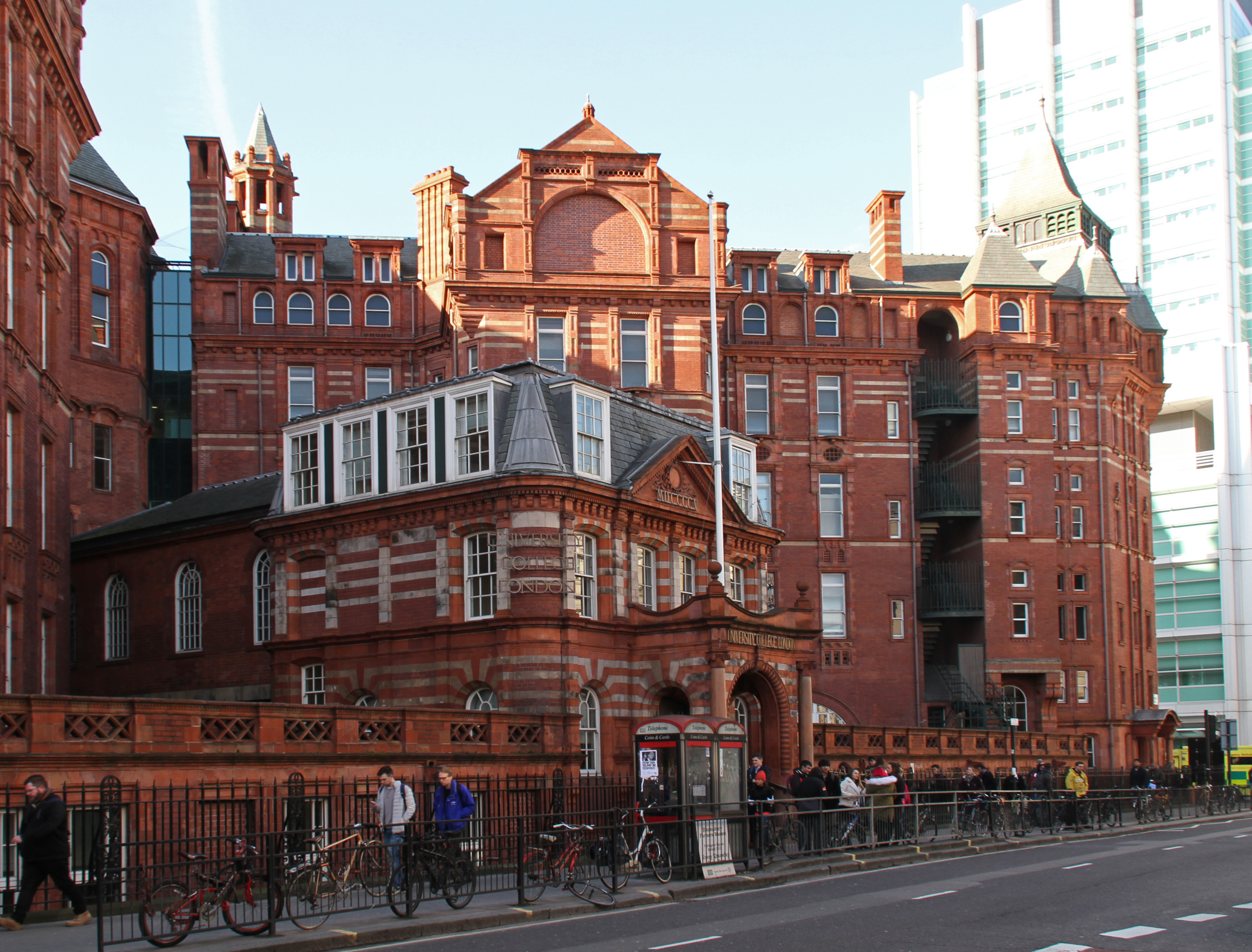
University College Hospital in 2017

Like many other Jewish physicians at his university, the Nazi takeover in 1933 resulted in the withdrawal of his permission to lecture, and in due course he moved to England.

On arrival in London he was asked to recertify in order to practice medicine. He opted against this and instead, with the help of Sir Archibald Gray, who had already recruited Freudenthal's old friend from Breslau W. N. Goldsmith, took up studies in dermatohistopathology at University College Hospital (UCH) in London. It was in this field that he was eventually appointed to the teaching faculty.

During the Second World War, he assisted in the outpatient department of UCH, and after the war he became active in postgraduate training of home and international dermatologists. In 1945 he was elected to the first readership in dermatological histology at UCH. He also wrote about numerous other skin conditions including amyloidosis, glomus tumour, mucin in granuloma annulare and Kaposi’s sarcoma. Encouragement and collaboration with dermatologist Geoffrey Dowling led to an interest in the relationship between dermatomyositis and scleroderma. He regularly attended the meetings of the dermatology section of the Royal Society of Medicine and demonstrated his specimens on the screen. His comments were reported in their Proceedings. In addition, he noted significant acanthosis in a lesion he was studying and coined the term "keratoacanthoma" which was adopted by dermatologist Arthur Rook and pathologist Ian Whimster in 1950.

== Death and legacy ==
Freudenthal suffered from constant headaches and heart disease in the final five years of life and, following a morning's work in the laboratory, died in London on 27 May 1952 at the age of 58. His wife survived him.

The writer, artist and illustrator Ruth Hoffmann, who was also a friend of Freudenthal, devoted to him a chapter in her book Meine Freunde aus Davids Geschlecht . The chapter, named Vom Lotto, vom Trendel und vom Waltersmann (about the Lotto, the dreidel and Waltersmann), contained a description of him:

A man with thinning, blackish hair, an unmistakable, nimble, bird-like gait, who would disappear as fast as he had approached. He would depart with a short farewell, which would not last longer than the usual good-bye on the main station of Breslau after a weekend trip, even when it involved foreign travel, the ocean, years, and war.

Numerous textbooks and articles by other dermatologists refer to him as Freudenthal of Wrocław.

== Selected publications ==
=== Articles ===
- "Verruca senilis und Keratoma senile", Archiv für Dermatologie und Syphilis, June 1926, Volume 152, Issue 2, pp. 505–528.
- "Amyloid in der Haut." Archiv für Dermatologie und Syphilis, 1930, pp. 40–94.
- "Nodular Non-Diabetic Cutaneous Xanthomatosis with Hypercholesterolæmia and Atypical Histological Features", co-authored with F. Parkes Weber, Proceedings of the Royal Society of Medicine, 1 March 1937, doi:10.1177/003591573703000505.
- "Sarcoid", British Journal of Tuberculosis and Diseases of the Chest, 1 January 1948, doi:10.1016/S0366-0869(48)80003-1, pp. 11–16.
- "Skin Biopsy", in Sidney Campbell (Ed.) Dyke's Recent Advances in Clinical Pathology, Blakiston, 1951.
- "Pseudoxanthoma elasticum and warts and condylomata" co-authored with Rudolph Spitzer in J. Jadassohn’s Handbuch der Haut- und Geschlechtskrankheiten: Nicht Entzündliche Dermatosen II, Springer-Verlag Berlin Heidelberg GMBH, 1969. ISBN 978-3-662-27153-7
