= Christopher Bunker =

British dermatologist (born 1956)

Christopher Bunker FRCP
- Born: 22 November 1956 (age 69)
- Education: University of Cambridge
- Awards: Sir Archibald Gray Medal (2019)
- Scientific career
- Fields: Dermatology
- Workplaces: University College London; Imperial College London

Christopher Barry Bunker, , , FRCP (born 22 November 1956) is a British dermatologist.

== Early life and education ==
Prof. Bunker was educated at Wycliffe College, Gloucestershire, St Catharine's College, Cambridge and Westminster Hospital Medical School, London. He was trained in general medicine in London, Derby and Oxford, and received his dermatology training in London. In 1992, he received the Cambridge University Sir Walter Langdon-Brown Prize for his postgraduate MD research on CGRP in Raynaud's phenomenon.

== Career ==
Prof. Bunker is currently a Consultant Dermatologist at University College Hospital, London, and holds honorary professorships at Imperial College London and University College London. With an h-index of 50, he has authored over 480 papers, letters, chapters and books.

Practising in the field of male genital dermatology, Bunker wrote the book Male Genital Skin Disease and over 170 peer-reviewed journal articles on the subject. He has established dedicated male-genital skin-disease clinics at Chelsea and Westminster Hospital and University College Hospital, and a private practice at King Edward VII's Hospital, London. His other areas of expertise within dermatology include medical dermatology, HIV dermatology, inpatient dermatology and severe drug reactions. He has co-authored national guidelines for the management of lichen sclerosus, severe drug reactions and HIV-associated malignancies.

Bunker was elected President of the British Association of Dermatologists in 2012 and held this office until 2014. He also sat on the Council of the Royal College of Physicians between 2012 and 2014, and is currently (2015-) honorary secretary of the British Skin Foundation research charity.

In 2019, he was awarded the Sir Archibald Gray Medal for outstanding services to dermatology.
