= Grzybowski =

Coat of arms of Grzybowski noble family

Grzybowski (Polish pronunciation: [ɡʐɨˈbɔfski]; feminine: Grzybowska; plural: Grzybowscy) is a surname of Polish-language origin.

Language	Masculine	Feminine
Polish	Grzybowski, Grzibovski	Grzybowska, Grzibovska
Lithuanian	Grybauskas	Grybauskienė (married); Grybauskaitė (unmarried)
Russian (Romanization)	Грибовский (Gribovsky, Gribovskiy, Gribovskij); Гржибовский (Grzhibovsky, Grzhibovskiy, Grzhibovskij)	Грибовская (Gribovskaya, Gribovskaia, Gribovskaja); Гржибовская (Grzhibovskaya, Grzhibovskaia, Grzhibovskaja)
Ukrainian (Romanization)	Гржибовський (Hrzhybovskyi, Hrzhybovskyy, Hrzhybovskyj)	Гржибовська (Hrzhybovska)

== People ==
- Henryk Grzybowski (1934–2012), Polish footballer
- Józef Grzybowski (1869–1922), Polish geologist
- Katarzyna Grzybowska (born 1989), Polish table tennis player
- Magdalena Grzybowska (born 1978), Polish tennis player
- Marcin Grzybowski (born 1979), Polish canoer
- Marian Grzybowski (1895–1949), Polish dermatologist
- Peter Grzybowski (1954–2013), Polish artist
- Wacław Grzybowski (1887–1959), Polish politician
- Zbigniew Grzybowski (born 1976), Polish footballer
