= Garbe =

Garbe may refer to

- Garbe, Lahmeyer & Co., a former electrical engineering company in Aachen, Germany
- Sulzberger–Garbe syndrome, a cutaneous condition
- B. J. Garbe (born 1981), American baseball player
- Robert Garbe (1847–1932), German railway engineer
