= Gribovsky =

Gribovsky is a Slavic surname. Notable people with the surname include:

- Adrian Gribovsky (1767–1834), Russian memoirist
- Roman Gribovsky (born 1995), Belarusian footballer

== See also ==
- Grybauskas
- Grzybowski
