= JDT =

JDT may refer to:

- Jamaica Dogsled Team
- Johor, also known as Johor Darul Ta'zim, a Malaysian state
- Johor Darul Ta'zim F.C., a Malaysian football club
- JDT Racing Team, a Malaysian Racing team
- Journal of Dermatological Treatment
- Judeo-Tat, a Judeo-Persian language
- Julian date and time
- Java Development Tools, part of the Eclipse IDE
- Japan Daylight Time
- Jon Dahl Tomasson, a Danish footballer and coach
