= Robert Cranston Low =

Scottish dermatologist

Robert Cranston Low FRSE FRCPE (1879–1949) was a Scottish physician and dermatologist. He served as president of the British Association of Dermatologists 1936–37.

== Life ==
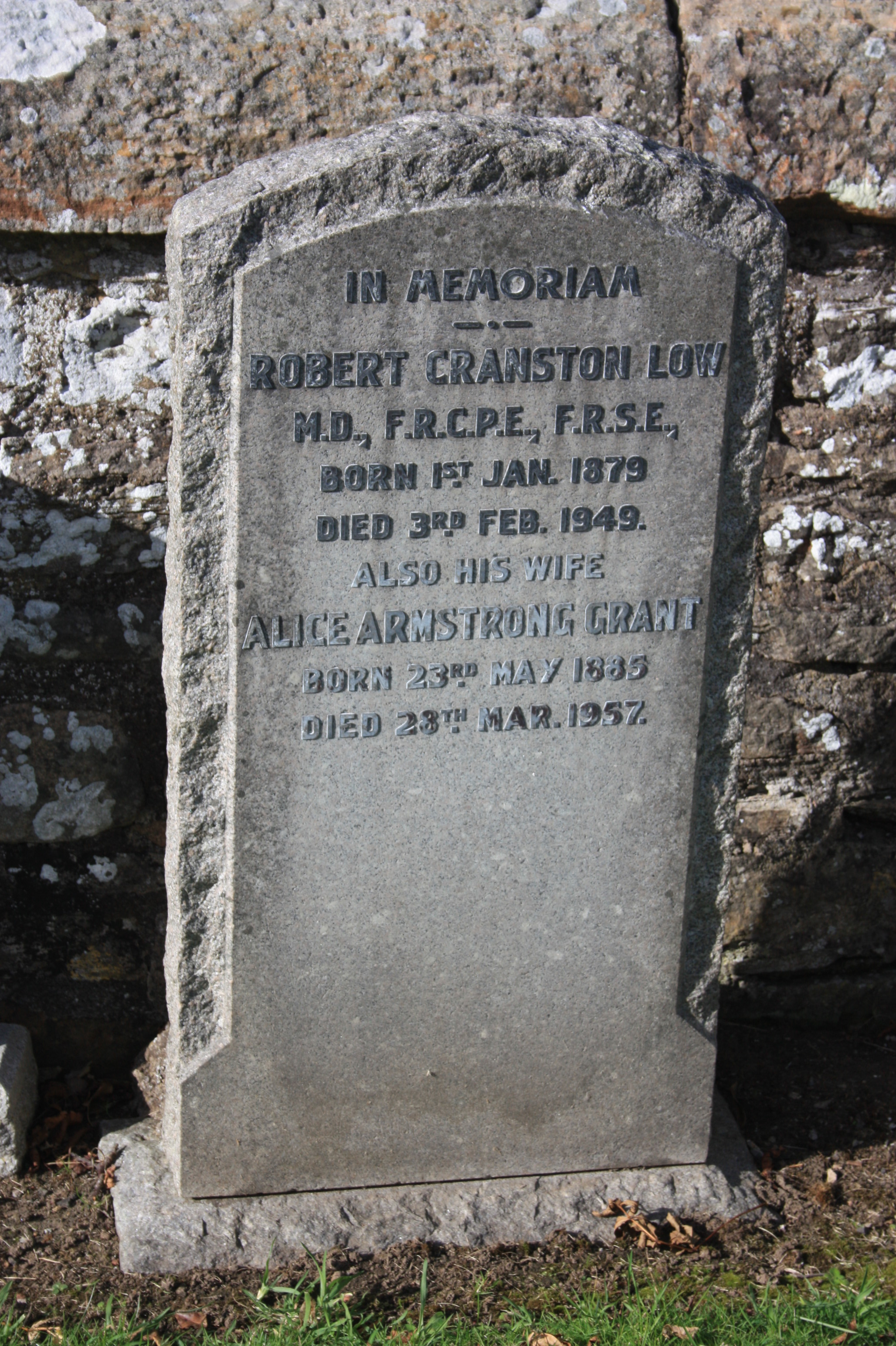
The grave of Robert Cranston Low, Currie Churchyard

He was born at Bonarty Lodge on Polwarth Terrace in Edinburgh in 1879, the son of Thomas Low. He was educated at Merchiston Castle School then studied medicine at the University of Edinburgh, graduating with an MB ChB in 1902. He received his doctorate (MD) in 1924 with his thesis Anaphylaxis and sensitisation. He became Consultant Physician in the Skin Department of Edinburgh Royal Infirmary.

In 1913 he was elected a member of the Harveian Society of Edinburgh. In 1934 he was elected a Fellow of the Royal Society of Edinburgh. His proposers were William Thomas Ritchie, James Hartley Ashworth, Thomas Jehu and Sir Ernest Maclagan Wedderburn.

He died on 3 February 1949 and is buried in Currie Churchyard south of Edinburgh. The grave stands on the north wall of the modern cemetery, backing onto the old churchyard.

== Family ==
He married twice. In 1914 he married Evelyn Frances Henderson and in 1922 he married Alice Armstrong Grant (1885-1957).
