= Horatio George Adamson =

British dermatologist

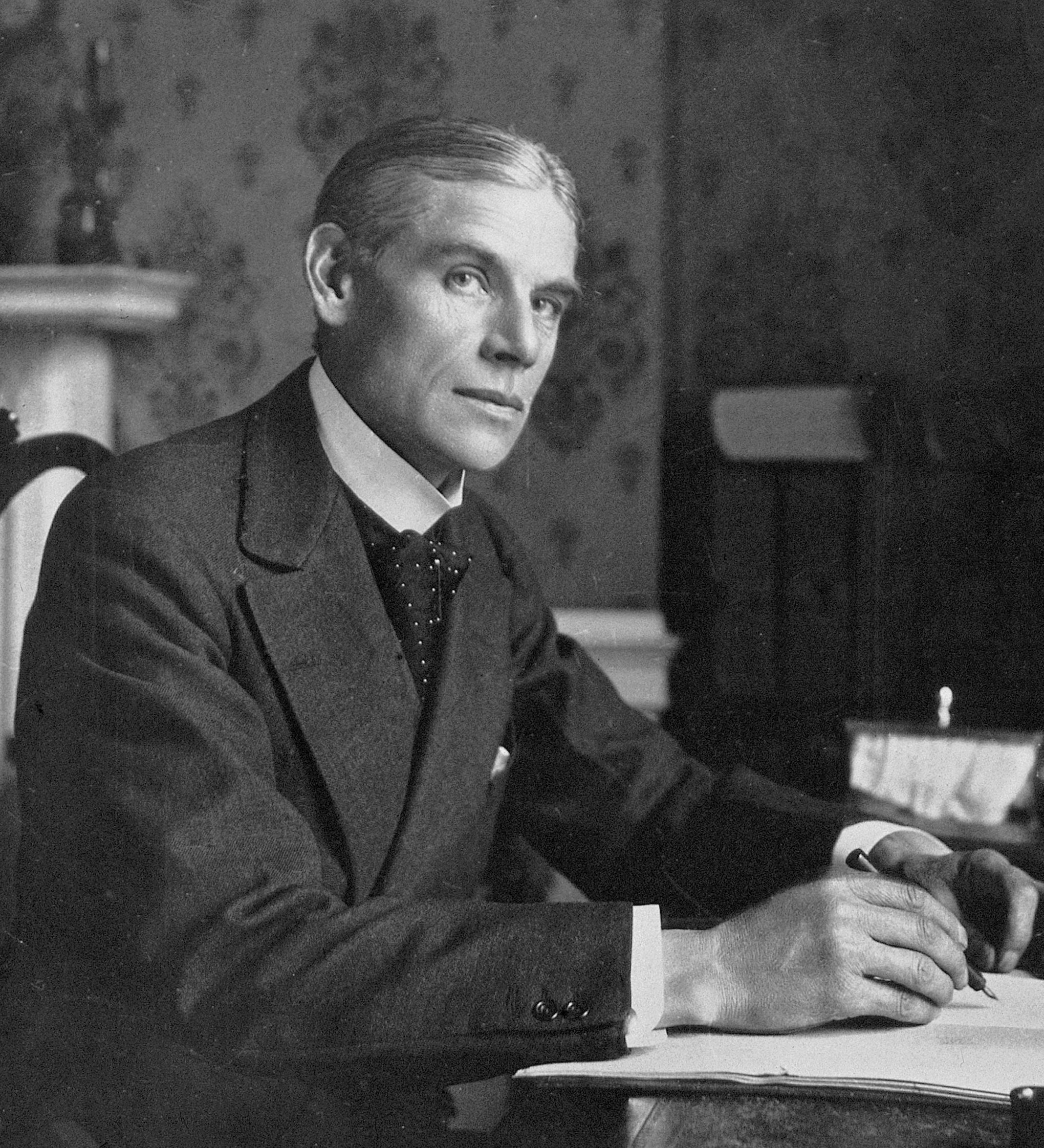
Horatio George Adamson

Horatio George Adamson (28 November 1865 – 6 July 1955) was a British dermatologist. He studied at St. Bartholomew's Hospital receiving his medical doctorate in 1888. He learned dermatology at the Middlesex Hospital in London from John James Pringle. Between 1909 and 1928, he lectured and practiced dermatology at St. Bartholomew's Hospital.

While working at the Downs Ringworm School of the Metropolitan Asylums Board in Sutton, Adamson developed an interest in mycology and modified Robert Kienböck's technique for X-ray epilation for scalp ringworm.

He was president of the British Association of Dermatologists for 1923–24 and a fellow of the Royal College of Physicians.

== Eponym ==
- Adamson's fringe
