= James Galloway (physician) =

British physician

Sir James Galloway in 1919

Sir James Galloway KBE, CB, FRCP (10 October 1862 – 18 October 1922) was a British physician specialising in dermatology and was consultant physician to Charing Cross Hospital. During World War I he served as a colonel in the Army Medical Services in France and was knighted by George V for services to medicine in 1918.

== Early career ==
Born in Calcutta in India in 1862, the son of James Galloway, a Scottish businessman, and Jane Hermina (née de Villeneuve), he was educated at the Chanonry School in Aberdeen and the University of Aberdeen, where he graduated MA in 1883 with honours in Natural Science. He passed the examinations for the Membership and Fellowship of the Royal College of Surgeons consecutively in 1889.

On moving to London he became Demonstrator of Pharmacy at the London Hospital Medical School where he took the advice of Sir Stephen Mackenzie and specialised in the study of dermatology. He was appointed Assistant Physician and Pathologist to the Great Northern Hospital in 1890, joined the British Medical Association in 1891 and was physician to the Skin Department at Charing Cross Hospital from 1894 to 1914. He was elected assistant physician to the hospital in 1901, becoming full physician in 1906; he lectured here on practical medicine from 1895 to 1906, on forensic medicine from 1901 to 1906, on materia medica from 1902 to 1907, and on medicine from 1908 till 1922, the year of his retirement as Consulting Physician. He was Consulting Physician for Skin Diseases to the Metropolitan Asylums Board and was president of the Section of Dermatology at the Birmingham Meeting of the British Medical Association in 1911. He contributed to Quain’s Dictionary and Allbutt’s System of Medicine, delivered the Morton Lecture before the Royal College of Surgeons in 1893, edited the British Journal of Dermatology from 1896 to 1904 and The British Journal of Dermatology and Syphilis from January 1896 to December 1904. He was appointed a Fellow of the Royal College of Physicians (FRCP) in 1897 and was a member of the Council of the Royal College of Physicians from 1916 to 1918, being elected a Censor in 1920, and was serving as Second Censor at the time of his death in 1922.

In 1898 he married Jessie Hermina Sawers, and with her had two sons and two daughters.

== War service ==
During World War I, he became a member of the advisory board of the Army Medical Services which had been formed in 1902 to reorganise the education of the officers in the Royal Army Medical Corps. Galloway was a liaison officer between the Medical Department at the War Office and the British Medical Association. He was largely responsible for organising the Central Medical War Committee which settled the arrangements for apportioning doctors between civilian and military requirements. He was appointed Consulting Physician with the British Army in France early in 1916 where he served as a colonel in the Army Medical Services with the First Army and Second Army and then with just the Second Army.

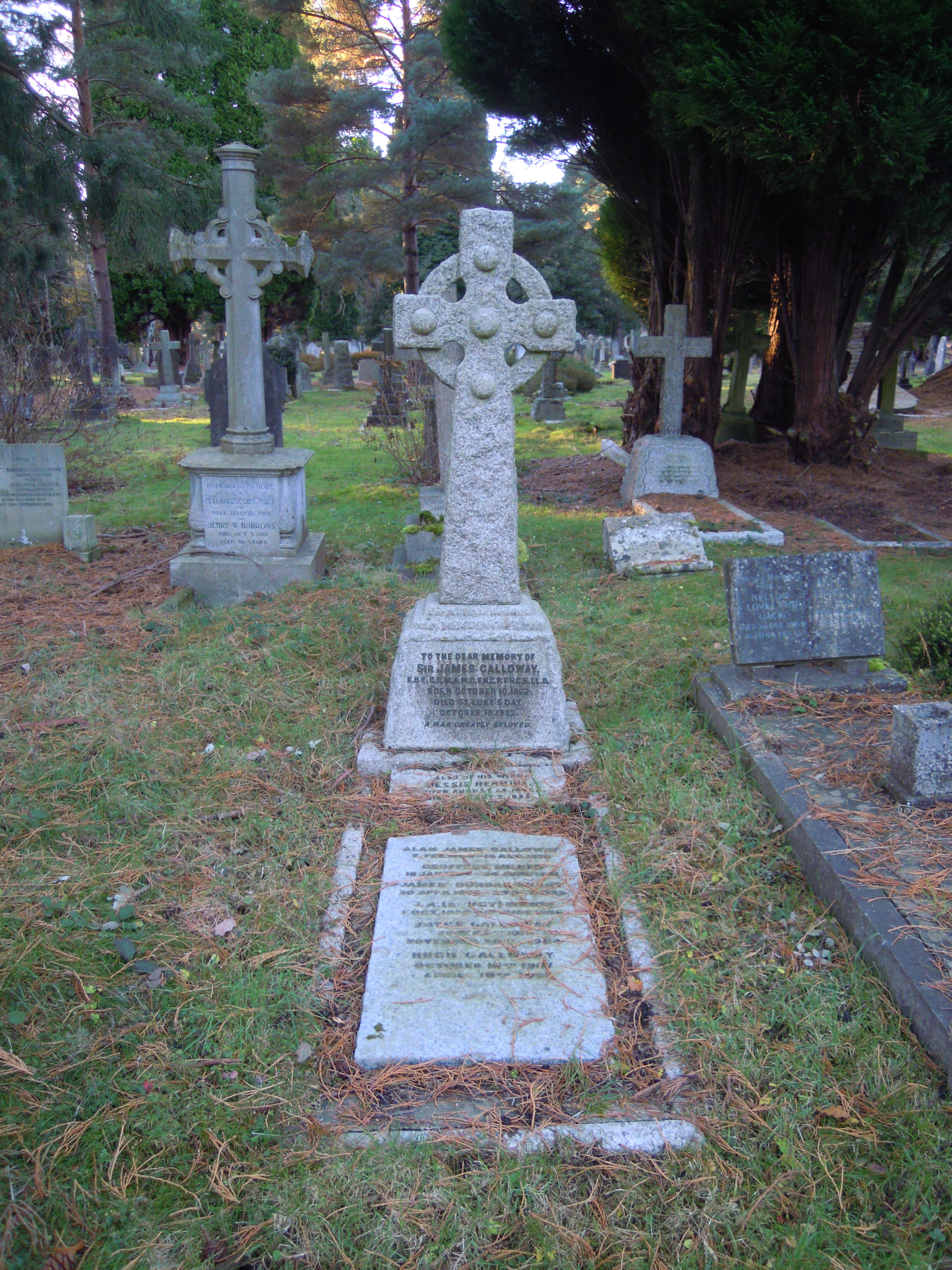
Galloway's grave in Brookwood Cemetery

In 1917, he was appointed as Chief Commissioner of Medical Services in the Ministry of National Service for which service he was appointed CB and was invested as OBE by George V which was later promoted to a KBE in the military division in 1918, while the University of Aberdeen awarded him the honorary degree of LL.D in 1919.

== Later years ==
After the war Galloway was chairman of the Conferences of Representatives of the Medical Staffs of Voluntary Hospitals. His interests included the field sciences, botany, zoology, and geology. He was an enthusiastic and accomplished amateur archaeologist and historian of medicine. He practised privately at 54 Harley Street.

Sir James Galloway died after a short illness on 18 October 1922 and was buried in Brookwood Cemetery.
