= Grybauskas =

- Lithuanian surname
- m.: Grybauskas
- f.: (unmarried): Grybauskaitė
- f.: (married): Grybauskienė
- Origin: Lithuanized Slavic surname
- Related names: Polish: Grzybowski, Russian: Gribovsky

Grybauskas is a Lithuanian language family name. It may refer to:

- Dalia Grybauskaitė (born 1956), former president of Lithuania
- Paulius Grybauskas (born 1984), Lithuanian footballer
