= George Hector Percival =

British dermatologist (1902–1983)

George Hector Percival FRSE FRCPE (1902–1983) was a British dermatologist, academic author and president of the British Association of Dermatologists.

== Life ==
He was born in Kirkcaldy in Fife, the son of E J Percival.

Percival was educated at George Watson's College in Edinburgh. He then studied medicine at the University of Edinburgh, graduating MB ChB.

He joined the Edinburgh Royal Infirmary's skin department in 1923, rising to become consultant-in-charge (physician) in 1936. From 1946 he was the Grant Professor of Dermatology at the University of Edinburgh.

He became an eminent dermatologist, a fellow of the Royal College of Physicians of Edinburgh, and president of the British Association of Dermatologists in 1961–62. In 1928 he was elected a Fellow of the Royal Society of Edinburgh. His proposers were George Barger, David Murray Lyon, Arthur Logan Turner and James Lorrain Smith. He resigned from the society in 1933. In 1931 he was elected a member of the Harveian Society of Edinburgh.

His research contributions included work on correlating skin diseases with calcium metabolism and parathyroid hormone, and vascular chemical mediators involved in cutaneous inflammation.

He died in Edinburgh on 3 April 1983.

== Publications ==
- An Introduction to Dermatology (1967) included as an author from the 9th Edition
- Atlas of Histopathology of the Skin (1962)
- An Atlas of Regional Dermatology

== Family ==
In 1937 he married Kathleen Dawson.
