= Journal of Dermatological Treatment =

- Discipline: Dermatology
- Language: English
- Edited by: Peter van de Kerkhof, Steven R. Feldman

Publication details
- History: 1989-present
- Publisher: Informa Healthcare
- Frequency: Bimonthly
- Impact factor: 2.9 (2022)

Standard abbreviations
- ISO 4: J. Dermatol. Treat.

Indexing
- CODEN: JDTREY
- ISSN: 0954-6634 (print); 1471-1753 (web)
- OCLC no.: 20763077

Links
- Journal homepage; Online access; Online archive

The Journal of Dermatological Treatment is a bimonthly peer-reviewed medical journal that covers all aspects of the treatment of skin disease, including the use of topical and systematically administered drugs and other forms of therapy. It is published by Informa Healthcare and the editors-in-chief are Peter van de Kerkhof (Radboud University Nijmegen) and Steven R. Feldman (Wake Forest University School of Medicine). The journal is available online and in paper format.

The journal was established in June 1989 in Cardiff, UK, by the co-founding editors, Ronald Marks and Andrew Y Finlay, published jointly by Martin Dunitz Ltd and The Macmillan Press Ltd. The journal was edited by Marks and Finlay until the September 1997 issue of Volume 8. From the December 1997 issue the editorship passed to Chris Griffiths and Jean-Paul Ortonne. In January 2004 Richard Groves and Steven R Feldman became editors. From 2008 the editors have been Steven R Feldman and Peter van de Kerkhof.

The journal was published four times each year from its foundation in 1989 until 2003. From 2004 six issues have been published each year.
