= Darrell Wilkinson =

British dermatologist (1919–2009)

Darrell Sheldon Wilkinson
- Born: 7 August 1919; Gillingham, Kent, England
- Died: 17 August 2009 (aged 90)
- Education: Epsom College
- Occupation: Dermatologist
- Spouse: Joan née Saunders
- Children: 3
- Awards: Sir Archibald Gray medal in 1986, received from British Association of Dermatologists

Peter Edward Darrell Sheldon Wilkinson (7 August 1919 – 17 August 2009) was a leading figure in dermatology who was consultant at Aylesbury and High Wycombe, co-edited the first edition of Rook's 1968 Textbook of Dermatology and founded the International Foundation for Dermatology in 1987.

Born in the south of England into a medical family, Wilkinson was educated in the classics before studying medicine in London.

He served in the Royal Navy during the Second World War, after which he pursued a medical career in London and later High Wycombe.

Wilkinson made some of the earliest dermatological descriptions of skin diseases including perioral dermatitis, photocontact dermatitis and Sneddon-Wilkinson disease. Described as "one of the greatest dermatologists of our time", he became president of the British Association of Dermatologists in 1979 and won the Sir Archibald Grey medal in 1984.

== Early life and education ==
Wilkinson was born in Gillingham, Kent, the son of Edgar Sheldon Wilkinson, a surgeon commander in the Royal Navy and later a general practitioner in London, and Muriel Kathleen née Edgar (known as 'Mitzi'), who later became Muriel Howarth. Wilkinson's mother, Muriel, a concert pianist, became director of the Institute of Atomic Information for the Layman and was an early "nuclear" enthusiast. He was educated at Epsom College, where initially he studied classics, achieved the status of prefect and won the Claude Calthrop Essay, Botany and Carr Divinity Prizes. It was at this time that his father died and Wilkinson found himself in the care of his grandparents. He later went to St Thomas' Hospital with a scholarship, qualifying with the Conjoint in 1942.

== Royal Navy ==
Almost as soon as he qualified, Wilkinson was sent to serve in the Royal Naval Reserve (RNVR) and was subsequently posted to Alexandria, Egypt, by the Special Operations Executive (S.O.E.). Parachuted into northern Greece, he completed most of his three years during World War II in the Greek mountains and islands behind enemy lines. It was here that he set up medical camps. Wilkinson then returned to St Thomas's Hospital to train in dermatology.

== Medical career ==
Describing his medical career as a "voyage", Wilkinson, at St Thomas' Hospital undertook speciality training in dermatology under Geoffrey Dowling and Hugh Wallace. With Arthur Rook and Eric Waddington, the Dowling Club was formed as a journal club and later became established in training young British dermatologists.

In 1947 Wilkinson became consultant dermatologist at Hitchin Hospital and at Epsom, Farnham and Guildford hospitals. He continued working as a consultant dermatologist at St Peter's Hospital, Chertsey and to the Aylesbury and High Wycombe hospitals, until his retirement from the NHS in 1981.

Wilkinson appreciated the less popular areas of dermatology including community dermatology, leg ulcers and specialist nursing. He was particularly recorded to have made many early dermatological descriptions including subcorneal pustular dermatosis (which became known as 'Sneddon-Wilkinson disease'), perioral dermatitis, glucagonoma syndrome, dequalinium balanitis, forefoot eczema and the first report of photocontact dermatitis, as well as other curiosities such as black heel and 'Chiltern chaps'. In 1958 he wrote Nursing and management of skin diseases (London, Faber and Faber), which ran to four editions.

Wilkinson, in 1968, contributed 14 chapters to the first comprehensive English-language textbook of dermatology, Rook's Textbook of Dermatology, otherwise known as the 'Rook book'. Along with Arthur Rook and John Ebling they edited three further editions.

== Roles and awards ==
Wilkinson was president of the St John's Dermatology Society from 1966 to 1967. In 1981, he became president of the dermatology section of the Royal Society of Medicine and in 1979 became president of the British Association of Dermatologists. As well as being elected a fellow of the Royal Society of Medicine in 1996 he was an honorary member of 16 other international dermatological associations.

Wilkinson received the British Association of Dermatologists' highest award, the Sir Archibald Gray medal in 1984. He has been described as one of the greatest dermatologists of the 20th century.

== Personal life ==
Wilkinson married Joan Saunders ('Jo') in 1945. They had three children, John, David and Julia. His son John succeeded him as a consultant dermatologist to High Wycombe, Amersham and Aylesbury.

Wilkinson was regarded as hospitable to his colleagues and foreign guests, hosting garden parties and dinners. He played the cello and piano and displayed homemade fireworks.

He died on 19 August 2009.
