= DEBRA =

Medical research charity

Debra fundraising charity shop in Guildford, UK

DEBRA (formerly known as DebRA) is the name of an international medical research charity dedicated to securing effective drug treatments and ultimately cures for every type of epidermolysis bullosa, with national groups in over 40 countries including in the United Kingdom and the United States.

== History ==
"Debra" is the first name of the daughter of Phyllis Hilton, the original founder of the organisation in the UK, which began as a support group for parents, guardians and carers of other young children with the condition.

Although the backronym of Dystrophic Epidermolysis Bullosa Research Association has been used by DEBRA UK in the past, the organisation provides information, research funding and support for all forms of EB, not just dystrophic, which is one of three main sub-types of the condition; the others being EB simplex and junctional EB.

The DebRA US organisation have continued to use the aforementioned acronym DEBRA for the Dystrophic EB Research Association of America since their formation in 1980.

== Work ==
Epidermolysis bullosa is a genetic condition that in its most severe forms affects all of the body's linings, the skin, the linings of the mouth and oesophagus, and even the eyes. In its most severe forms the linings blister or rip away from the flesh under the lightest of frictions. For example, rolling over in bed can cause skin to tear away from behind the ears, and the sufferer may wake up with up to 30 blisters each morning.

There is no treatment bar the lancing and draining of these blisters to stop their growth. Sufferers of the severest form die prematurely of skin cancer (their life expectancy is usually reduced by 30–40 years); in some, death occurs in infancy. Each day sufferers face a battle against fluid loss and infections due to open wounds. Blistering can also affect inner body linings, such as the mouth and throat. Sufferers of the severest forms have difficulties with eating due to the rawness in their mouths and often have to have a feeding tube fitted.

EB has a number of distinct forms: in the least severe form, blistering is confined to the hands and feet. In more severe cases, the whole body is affected and wounds heal very slowly, giving rise to scarring, physical deformity and significant disability.

== In the UK ==
DEBRA UK is the national medical research charity and patient support organisation for individuals and families affected by EB. There are at least 5,000 people living with this devastating condition in the UK and 500,000 people worldwide.

DEBRA UK was founded in 1978 and provides an enhanced specialist EB nursing service, in partnership with the NHS, to deliver optimal healthcare to children and adults living with EB and community support staff to work directly with families. The charity also commissions research into the condition with the aim of finding effective drug treatments and, ultimately, a cure for EB. DEBRA UK has over 90 charity shops across the country. Donations and proceeds from shops fund services for epidermolysis bullosa affected families and medical research into the condition.

Lucy Beall Lott, a model with recessive dystrophic epidermolysis bullosa, is an ambassador for DEBRA UK.

== In the United States ==
Debra of America was founded in 1980 by Arlene Pessar and her son, Eric Lopez, who was born with epidermolysis bullosa. It is the only U.S. nonprofit organization that provides all-inclusive support to the EB community, through funding research for a cure and by providing free programs and services for those with EB. The mission of debra of America is to improve the quality of life for all people living in the United States with EB, their families, and caregivers, through free programs and services while funding research to find a cure and treatments for EB.

In 2015, Debra of America launched a series of TV and web commercials alongside a campaign titled #ItWontHurtToWatch These commercials, produced by health and wellness advertising agency HAVAS Worldwide Tonic, are intended to spread awareness of the debilitating rare disease.

== Other countries ==
A list of national groups may be found at DEBRA International.
