= Józef Grzybowski =

Polish paleontologist

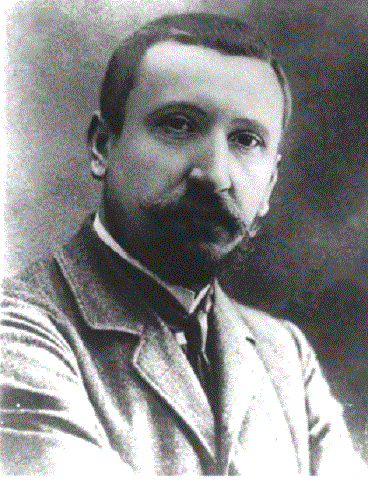
Portrait of Józef Grzybowski

Józef Grzybowski (March 17, 1869 – February 17, 1922), was a Polish geologist, paleontologist and foraminiferologist.

Grzybowski was born in Kraków. He was educated at Jagiellonian University where he became the director of the Paleontological Laboratory. Grzybowski was a Professor of Palaeontology at the Jagiellonian University in Kraków, a pioneer in the use of microfossils for stratigraphical applications.
