= Regression (medicine) =

Reversal of disease symptoms

Regression in medicine is the partial or complete reversal of a disease's signs and symptoms.

- Clinically, regression generally refers to a decrease in severity of symptoms without completely disappearing. At a later point, symptoms may return. These symptoms are then called recidive.

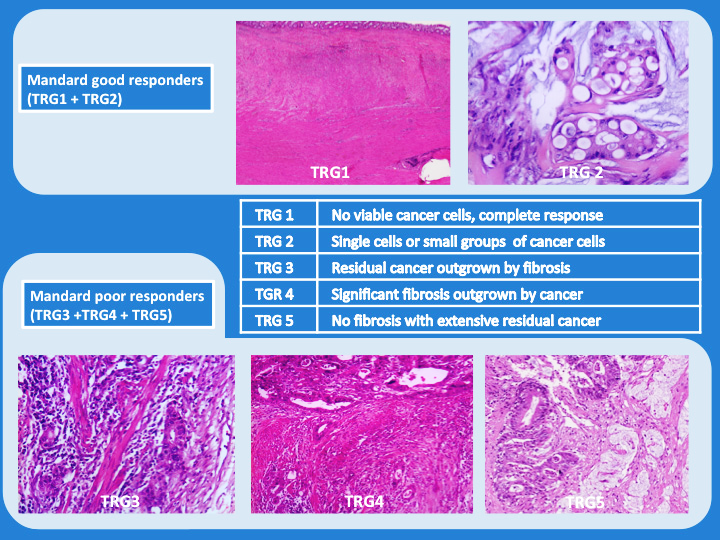
Mandard tumor regression grade (TRG), in this case showing rectal cancer.

- In cancer, regression refers to a specific decrease in the size or extent of a tumour. In histopathology, histological regression is one or more areas within a tumor in which neoplastic cells have disappeared or decreased in number. In melanomas, this means complete or partial disappearance from areas of the dermis (and occasionally from the epidermis), which have been replaced by fibrosis, accompanied by melanophages, new blood vessels, and a variable degree of inflammation.
