= Chris Griffiths (dermatologist) =

- Born: June 1954 (age 72)
- Education: St Thomas's Hospital Medical School
- Awards: Sir Archibald Gray Medal (2015); Society of Cosmetic Scientists' Medal (2016)
- Scientific career
- Workplaces: University of Michigan; University of Manchester

Christopher Ernest Maitland Griffiths OBE (born June 1954) is a British dermatologist. He is the Foundation Professor of Dermatology at the University of Manchester, Director of the Manchester Centre for Dermatology Research, and Head of the Dermatology Theme of the National Institute for Health Research (NIHR) Manchester Biomedical Research Centre. He is an Honorary Consultant Dermatologist at Salford Royal NHS Foundation Trust.

Griffiths graduated with a first-class degree in Anatomy from St Thomas's Hospital Medical School in 1976 and completed an MB BS in Medicine in 1979. He trained in Dermatology at St Mary's Hospital, London, where he was a Wellcome Trust Clinical Research Training Fellow from 1985 to 1987. In 1987 he became a research fellow in Dermatology at the University of Michigan, becoming an Assistant Professor from 1989 to 1993. He founded the Manchester Dermatopharmacology Unit and the Manchester Psoriasis Service in 1994, and co-founded the International Psoriasis Council in 2004. He was President of the British Association of Dermatologists from 2004 to 2005.

He is a Fellow of the Academy of Medical Sciences and an elected Member of Academia Europaea. He was awarded the Sir Archibald Gray Medal for outstanding service to British Dermatology in 2015, and the Society of Cosmetic Scientists' Medal in 2016. He was made an OBE in the 2018 New Year Honours, for services to dermatology. He has an h-index of 113.
