= Black heel and palm =

- Other names: Calcaneal petechiae, Chromidrose plantaire, Post-traumatic punctate intraepidermal hemorrhage, Tache noir, and Talon noir
- Specialty: Dermatology

Black heel and palm is a skin condition characterized by a sudden shower of minute, black, punctate macules occurring most often on the posterior edge of the plantar surface of one or both heels.

== See also ==
- Skin lesion
- List of cutaneous conditions
