= Marian Grzybowski =

Polish dermatologist

- Born: 15 June 1895; Chardzhou, Russian Empire
- Died: 11 December 1949 (aged 54)
- Known for: Describing generalized eruptive keratoacanthoma of Grzybowski
- Scientific career
- Fields: Dermatology

Marian Grzybowski (15 June 1895 in Chardzhou – 11 December 1949) was a Polish dermatologist. He authored more than 80 scientific publications. He first described a variant of keratoacanthoma, called today generalized eruptive keratoacanthoma of Grzybowski.
