= British Skin Foundation =

UK health charity

The British Skin Foundation is a registered charity in the UK. The charity aims to raise money for skin care research as well as raising awareness. The charity gives grants to several colleges within the UK for research.

The British Association of Dermatologists, which was the largest single donor in 2009, works closely with the British Skin Foundation.

The charity also has a HealthUnlocked online community providing peer support and help to people with skin disease and skin cancer.

HRH Princess Beatrice is the charity's royal patron.
