= British Association of Dermatologists =

- Abbreviation: BAD
- Type: Medical association
- Legal status: Charity
- Headquarters: Willan House, 4 Fitzroy Square, London, United Kingdom, W1T 5HQ
- Region served: United Kingdom
- Main organ: British Journal of Dermatology
- Website: www.bad.org.uk

The British Association of Dermatologists is a charity established in 1920 whose charitable objects are the practice, teaching, training, and research of dermatology. It produces the British Journal of Dermatology, a monthly peer-reviewed medical journal and organises annual conferences.

== Notable presidents ==
Name	Years	Comments
Malcolm Morris	1920–21	
Horatio Adamson	1923–24	
Humphry Rolleston	1931–32	
Robert Bolam	1933–34	
Ernest Graham Little	1935–36	
Robert Cranston Low	1936–37	
George Percival	1961–62	
Arthur Rook	1974–75	
Darrell Wilkinson	1979–80	
Chris Griffiths	2004–05	
Christopher Bunker	2012–14	
