= Geoffrey Barrow Dowling =

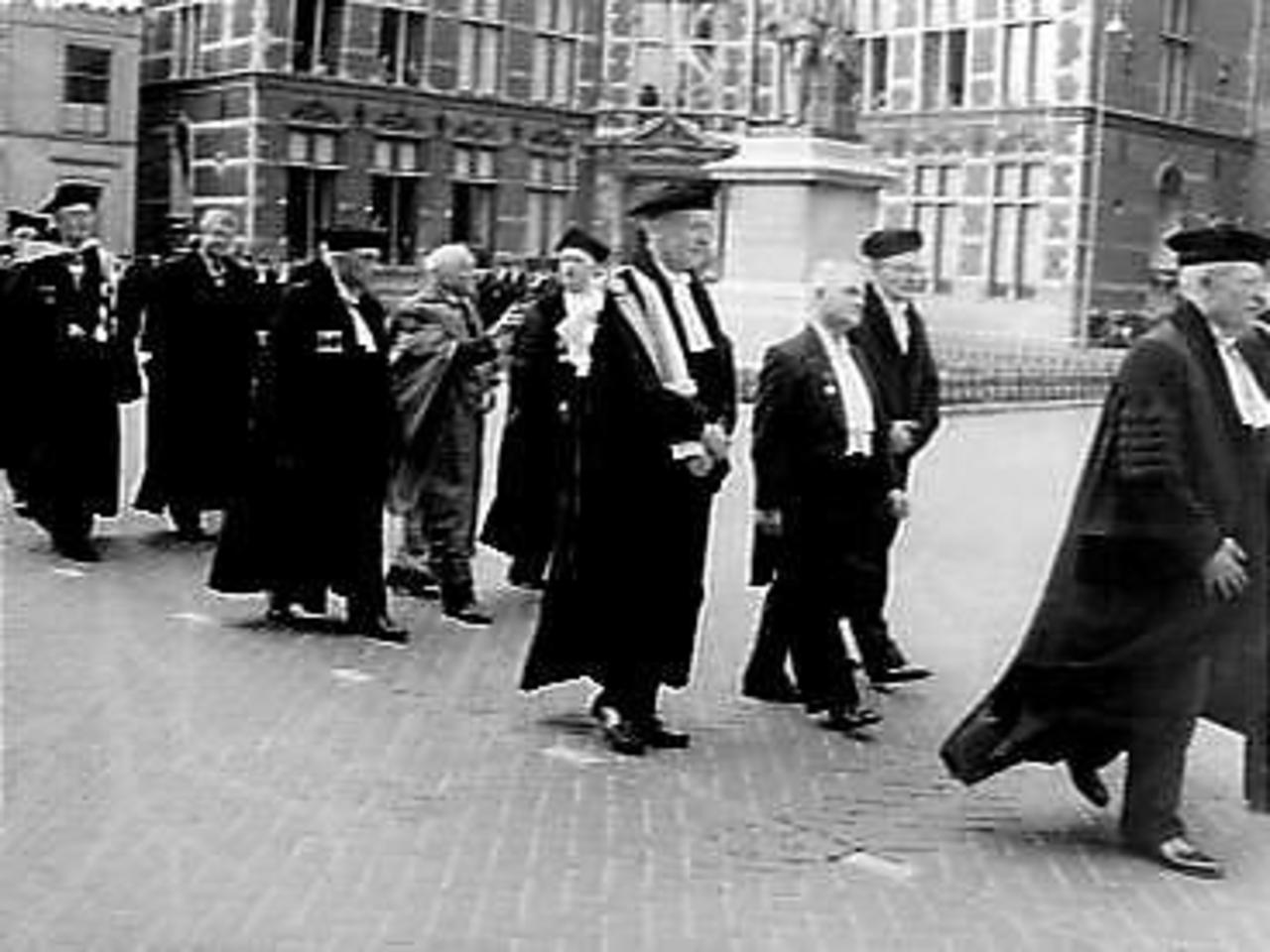
Dowling walking to the reception of his honorary doctorate of Utrecht University (1957)

Geoffrey Barrow Dowling (9 August 1891-1 June 1976), was a consultant dermatologist at St Thomas's Hospital and St John's Hospital for Diseases of the Skin, who encouraged the study of histopathology and demonstrated the beneficial effects of large doses of calciferol in the treatment of lupus vulgaris in 1945. In addition, he worked with Walter Freudenthal on dermatomyositis and scleroderma. He established The Dowling Club in the 1940s.
