= John Ebling =

British academic

Francis John Govier Ebling (21 June 1918 – 29 May 1992), generally known as John Ebling, was Professor of Zoology at the University of Sheffield from 1968 to 1983, and subsequently emeritus Professor of Dermatology 1983–1992. He is best known as a researcher in marine biology who helped to establish Lough Hyne as a field station, and is one of the lead characters in Reflections on a Summer Sea, a history of this facility. He had a second research interest on sebaceous gland function and skin. This dominated in later life, and he was editor of the 3rd to 5th editions of the Textbook of Dermatology. He also authored and edited a number of other books on biology and endocrinology including The Glands Inside Us and Population Control by Social Behaviour.

== Early life ==
John Ebling was educated at the Colston's School in Bristol, and completed undergraduate studies at the University of Bristol.

== Career ==
John Ebling graduated in Zoology in 1940 at the University of Bristol, where his interest in marine biology was stimulated by Sir Maurice Yonge. Whilst studying for a PhD also at Bristol, his interest in Endocrinology was stimulated by Dr Max Reiss at the Burden Neurological Institute. His first academic appointment was at the University of Hull in 1948, but he moved to the University of Sheffield soon after to join a rapidly expanding group of comparative endocrinologists led by Ian Chester-Jones. He was a founding member of the Institute of Biology (later to become the Society of Biology) and of the Society for Endocrinology, and served as the treasurer (1961–1966). In 1968 he was appointed to a personal chair in the Department of Zoology which he held until 1982. On retirement he was appointed as an emeritus Professor in the Department of Dermatology.

== Personal life ==
John Ebling married Erika Graetzer (born 17 May 1925) on 5 September 1948 at St Mary Redcliffe Bristol. He had a daughter (Nicola, born 23 May 1955) and a son (Francis John Peter, born 7 November 1959). His son also entered academia and was appointed Professor of Neuroendocrinology at the University of Nottingham in 2007, and served as chair of the British Society for Neuroendocrinology 2006–2010.
