= Sulzberger–Garbe syndrome =

- Other names: Oid-oid disease
- Specialty: Dermatology

Sulzberger–Garbe syndrome is a cutaneous condition, a type of therapy resistant nummular eczema.

== See also ==
- Id reaction
- List of cutaneous conditions
