= British Journal of Dermatology =

- Discipline: Dermatology
- Language: English
- Edited by: John Ingram

Publication details
- History: 1888–present
- Publisher: Wiley-Blackwell on behalf of the British Association of Dermatologists (United Kingdom)
- Frequency: Monthly
- Impact factor: 11.113 (2021)

Standard abbreviations
- ISO 4: Br. J. Dermatol.

Indexing
- CODEN: BJDEAZ
- ISSN: 0007-0963 (print); 1365-2133 (web)
- LCCN: 11014759
- OCLC no.: 614652454

Links
- Journal homepage; Online archive; Online archive

The British Journal of Dermatology is a monthly peer-reviewed medical journal that covers the field of dermatology. It is published by Wiley-Blackwell on behalf of the British Association of Dermatologists. The journal was established in 1888 and the editor-in-chief is John Ingram. According to the Journal Citation Reports, the journal has a 2020 impact factor of 9.3., ranked third within the dermatology subject category.

== Origins and early history ==
The journal was founded in 1888 as the British Journal of Dermatology, published by Blackwell's. It was edited from 1896 to 1904 by Sir James Galloway. In 1917, the words "and syphilis" were added to the title, and dropped in 1950.
