= Edith Smith =

Edith Smith may refer to:

- Edith Smith (artist) (1867–1954), Canadian painter and teacher
- Edith Smith (police officer) (1876–1923), first female police officer in the United Kingdom with full power of arrest
- Edith Smith (nurse) (died 1980), British nurse and matron
- Edith Philip Smith (1897–1976), Scottish botanist and teacher
- Edith Bowman (born 1974), Scottish radio DJ and TV presenter, married name Smith

== See also ==
- Faith Edith Smith (1873–1957), American librarian
- Edith Smith Davis (1859–1918), major leader in the temperance movement
- Edith Renfrow Smith (1914–2026), supercentenarian and first African American woman to graduate from Grinnell College in Iowa
