= Woodwark =

Woodwark is a surname. Notable people with this surname include:

- Arthur Stanley Woodwark (1875–1945), British physician
- George Millington Woodwark (1923–2012), British/Canadian cardiologist
- Graham Woodwark (1874–1938), English Liberal politician

== See also ==
- Woodwark, Queensland, a locality in Queensland, Australia
