= Isabel Bennett =

Isabel Bennett may refer to:

- Isabel Bennett (nurse) (1862–1932), English matron of the Metropolitan Free Hospital
- Isabel Bennett (politician), People's United Party member of the Senate of Belize

== See also ==
- Isobel Bennett, Australian marine biologist
