= Arthur Stanley Woodwark =

Sir Arthur Stanley Woodwark CBE
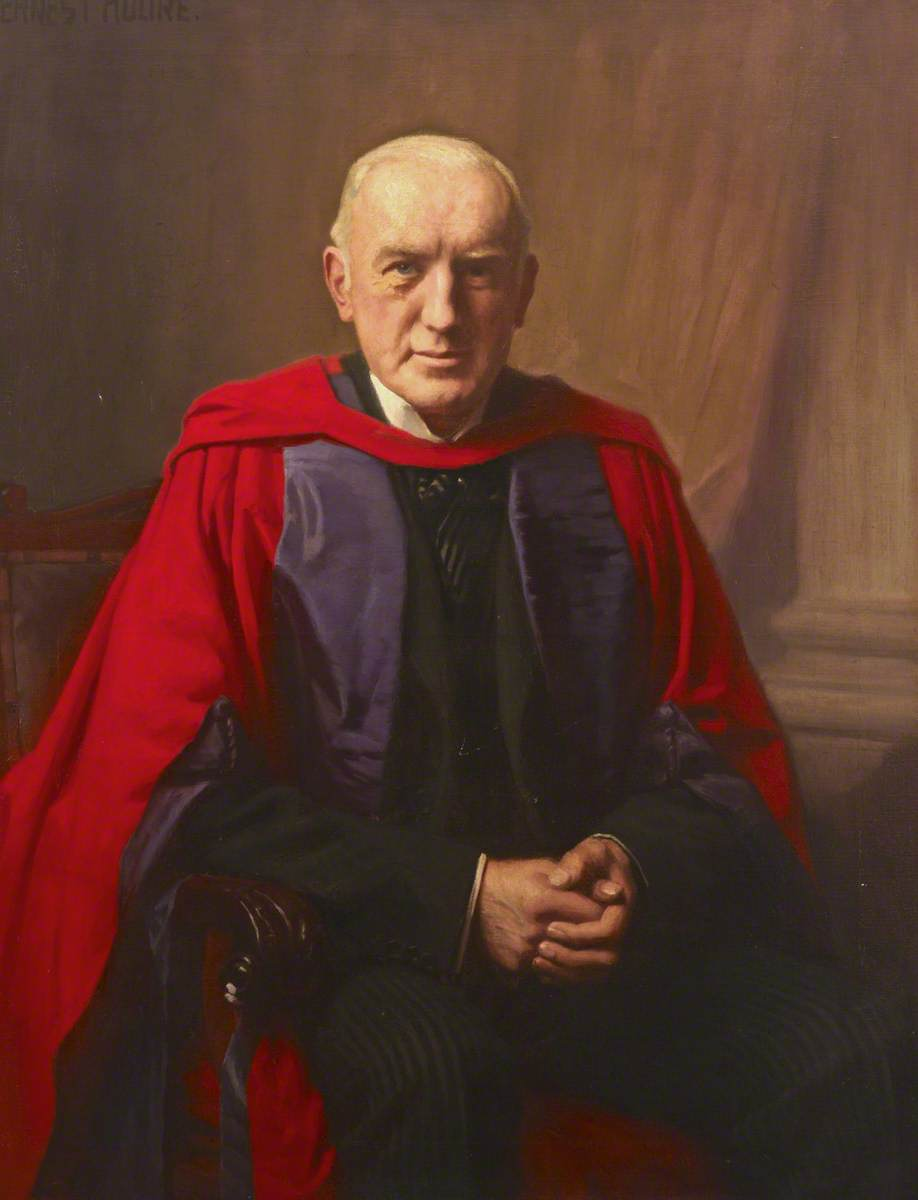
- Sir Stanley Woodwark by Ernest Moore
- Born: 1875
- Died: 11 May 1945 (aged 69–70)
- Education: St Bartholomew's Hospital
- Occupation: Physician
- Known for: Dean of Westminster Hospital Medical School
- Relatives: George Millington Woodwark (son)
- Medical career
- Institutions: Great Northern Central Hospital; Hospital for Sick Children; St Bartholomew's Hospital; King's College Hospital; Queen Alexandra Military Hospital

Sir Arthur Stanley Woodwark CBE (1875 – 11 May 1945), was a British physician who served as dean of the medical school at Westminster Hospital.

He authored the Manual of Medicine, first published in 1912, before reaching a fourth edition. His main work involved being a medical examiner, compensation cases and being a medical witness.

== Early life and education ==
Stanley Woodwark was born in 1875, the third of six sons of George S. Woodwark of King's Lynn, and was educated at Felsted, Essex.

== Career ==
After studying medicine at St Bartholomew's Hospital and gaining his MRCS and LRCP in 1902, he spent some time as a ship's surgeon and took resident appointments at the Royal Free Hospital. In 1906 he passed the MBBS after spending some time in general practice. He completed junior posts at the Great Northern Central Hospital, the Hospital for Sick Children, St. Bartholomew's, where he was casualty physician, and King's College Hospital, where he was medical registrar. In 1909 he gained his MD. At the Throat Hospital, Golden Square, and the Royal Waterloo Hospital for Children and Women, he held honorary appointments. During the First World War, he was promoted to the rank of colonel, and held the position of D.A.D.M.S., London District, deputy assistant director-general at the War Office. At the Queen Alexandra Military Hospital he was appointed consulting physician.

In 1912 he authored the Manual of Medicine, which reached four editions. His main work involved being a medical examiner, compensation cases and being a medical witness.

In 1919 he was appointed assistant physician to the Westminster Hospital and dean of its medical school. He gained his FRCP the following year. He had been an examiner for both the LMSSA and Conjoint board.

== Awards and honours ==
He was awarded the CMG in 1918 and the CBE in 1919. He was made deputy lieutenant in 1931.. In 1932 he was knighted, and was also made knight of St John of Jerusalem. He served as master of the Society of Apothecaries between 1941 and 1943, was master of the Barbers from 1942 to 1944, and master of the Turner's company in 1943. He was president of the Royal Institute of Public Health and Hygiene. He was also a member of the BMA, the Savage Club, and on council for the MDU.

== Personal and family ==
In 1911 he married Hilda, daughter of Sir Richard Robinson, and they had a daughter and three sons, including George Millington Woodwark.

== Selected publications ==
- Manual of medicine. Edinburgh: Frowde. 1912. OCLC 14802168.
- Medical nursing. London: Edward Arnold. 1914. OCLC 1157743123.
