= Mabel Cave =

Mabel Helen Cave RRC
- Born: 1863; Lidgate, Suffolk
- Died: 1953 (aged 89–90); Bury St Edmunds
- Education: The London Hospital
- Occupations: Matron and Nursing Leader

Mabel Helen Cave RRC (1863–1953) was a British matron of The Westminster Hospital and West Suffolk General Hospital, and war time nursing leader. She was a member of the Army Nursing Board. Cave was also on the committee to establish the King Edward VII Memorial Homes for nurses who were unable to work.

== Early life ==
Mabel was fifth child of nine born to her parents, Robert Haynes Cave, who was a clergyman, and his wife, Elizabeth Vernon George. Mabel was born in 1863 in Lidgate, Suffolk. She stayed at home until she started training at The London Hospital under Matron Eva Luckes in September 1888.

== Career ==
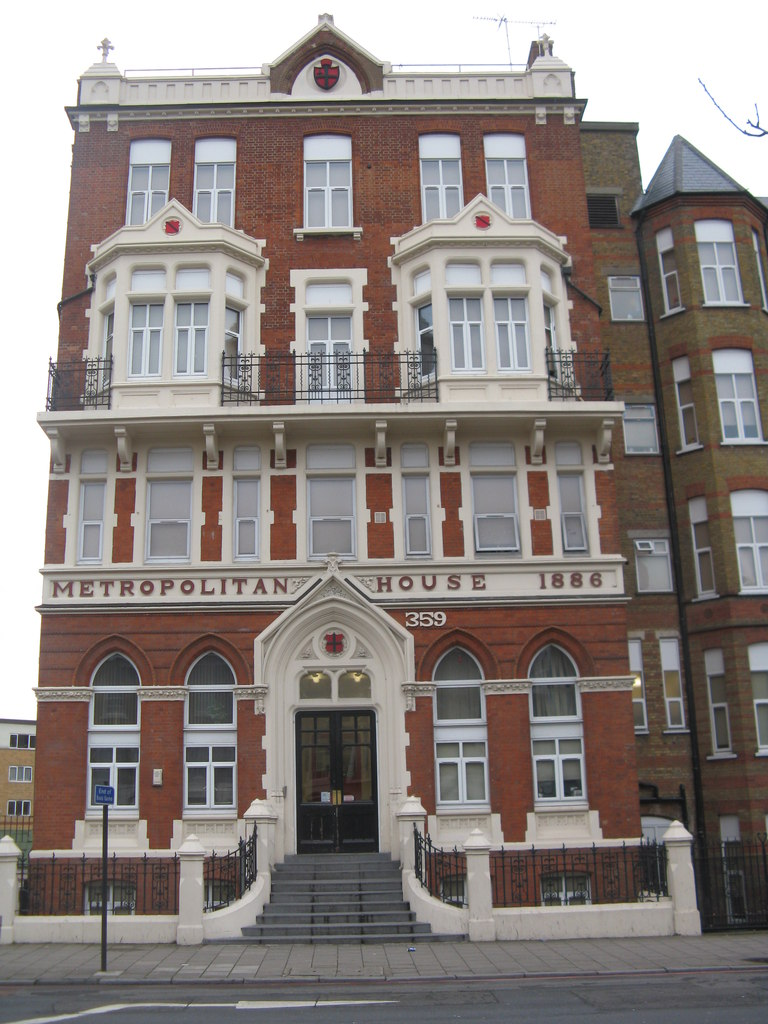
The Metropolitan Hospital

After her training Cave remained at The London for seven years working in senior roles including Linen Room Assistant and Matron's Office Assistant. In May 1897 Cave was recommended by Luckes and Sydney Holland to become acting matron of the Metropolitan Free Hospital in Kingsland Road, Hackney. She remained there for a year and was succeeded by Isabel Bennett, another Londoner.

In 1898 Cave was appointed as matron at The Westminster Hospital in central London. Cave remained there as matron for 14 years, her matronship cut short because of illhealth. Whilst matron she was appointed to the Army Nursing Board, the management board for the newly founded Queen Alexandra's Imperial Military Nursing Service in 1902. She succeeded Lousia Gordon, matron of St Thomas's Hospital to the board, and along with Katherine Monk, matron of Kings College Hospital was one of two civilian matrons on the committee. Cave would have known two other board members Frederick Treves and Sydney Holland from her time at The London Hospital. Cave remained on the board until she resigned because of ill health in 1913/1914.

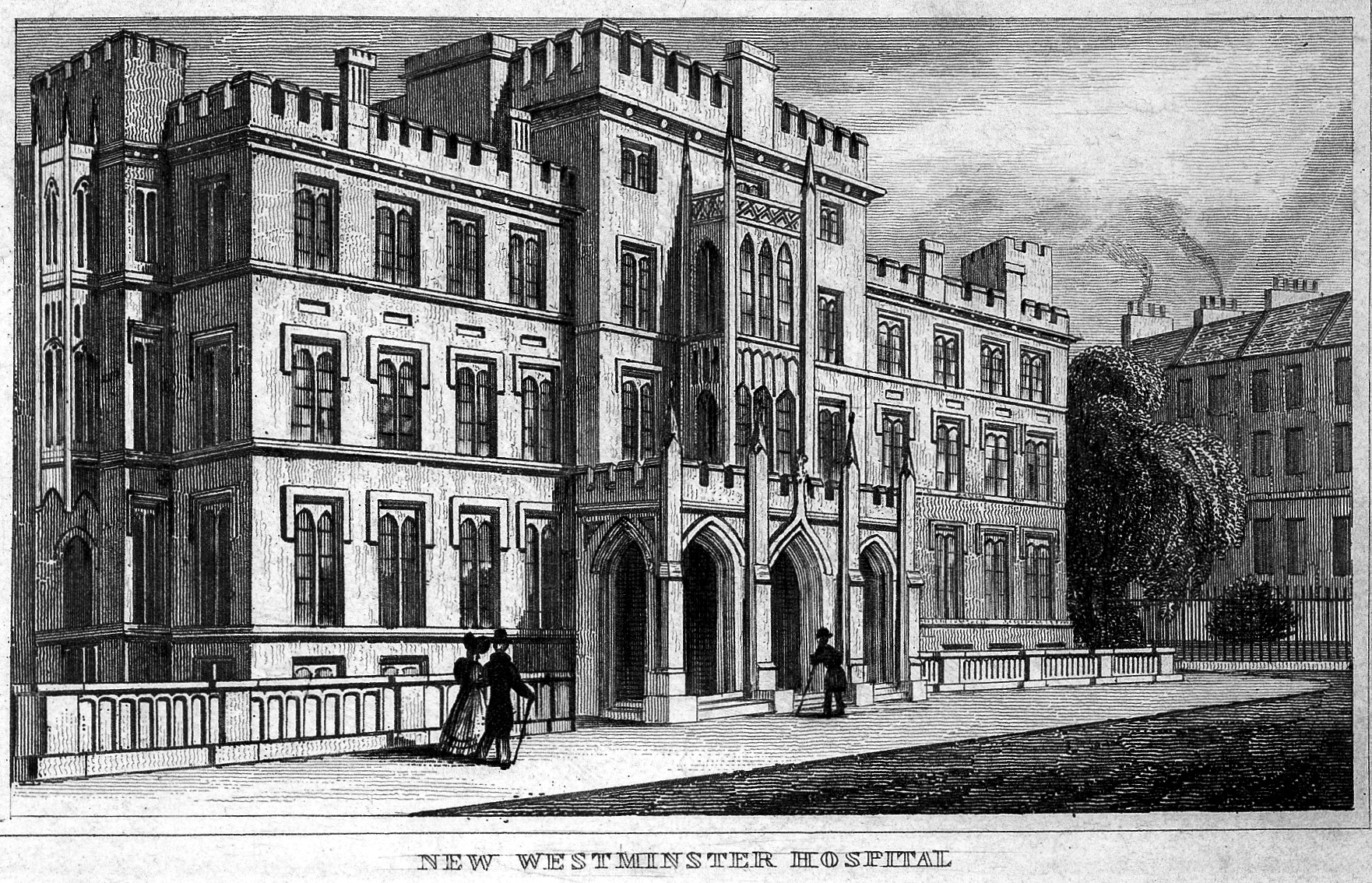
The old Westminster Hospital

Whilst at the Westminster Hospital, she hosted the inaugural committee of the King Edward the Seventh Homes for Nurses, of which she was also a committee member, which was formed to discuss the establishment of homes for nurses who were no longer able to work. In 1912 she was appointed as a committee member for the newly formed Nurses Insurance Society which was created to provide sick pay for nurses, as part of the new National Insurance Act.

Cave was appointed matron of Red House Auxiliary Hospital, Leatherhead, Surrey in October 1914, and she held the post until January 1915. She was also living at Suffolk County Hospital in 1914. From about 1915 Cave was matron of West Suffolk General Hospital, Bury St Edmunds, Suffolk.

== Retirement ==
Cave retired in 1921 after six years as matron of Bury Hospital. She died in Bury St Edmunds on 8 April 1953 aged 90 years old.

== Honours ==
Cave was awarded the Royal Red Cross, 1st Class in 1917. After Cave received the award at Buckingham Palace she attended a reception at Marlborough House held by Queen Alexandra. On her return home to the Bury and West Suffolk General Hospital later that day she was given a 'hearty welcome'.
