= Queen Alexandra Military Hospital =

Hospital in Millbank, London

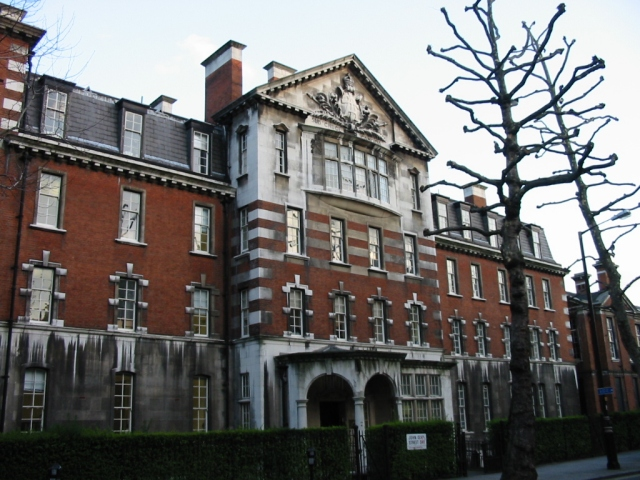
- Entrance at 20 John Islip Street

- Shown in Westminster

Geography
- Location: Millbank, London, England, United Kingdom
- Coordinates: 51.492108°N 0.127377°W

Organisation
- Care system: Public NHS
- Type: Military

History
- Founded: 1905
- Closed: 1977

Links
- Lists: Hospitals in England

The Queen Alexandra Military Hospital (QAMH) opened in July 1905. It was constructed immediately to the north of the Tate Britain (across a side-street) adjacent to the River Thames on the borders of the neighbourhoods of Millbank and Pimlico, Westminster, London. The hospital closed in 1977, but several buildings remain.

== History ==
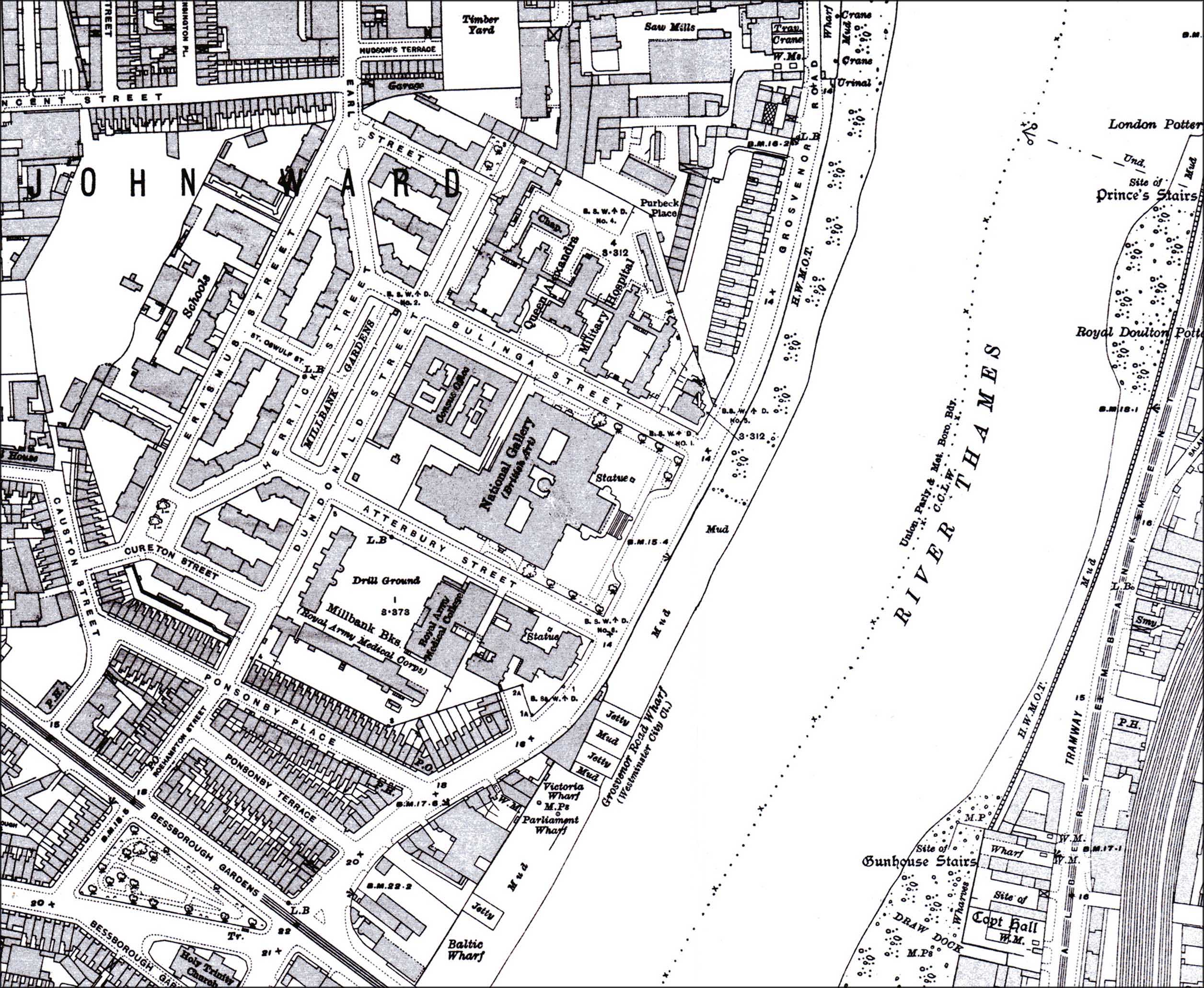
Ordnance Survey maps of London extract for 1916 showing location of the hospital, art gallery and medical college and the octagonal outline of the former Millbank Prison on the entire site still visible

The hospital was officially opened by King Edward VII and his wife Queen Alexandra, who was the president of the Queen Alexandra's Royal Army Nursing Corps, in July 1905.

In 1907 the Royal Army Medical College opened on the south side of the Tate Gallery.

In the First World War it became a general hospital for the British Army. Apart from the war-wounded by munitions, it attended to cases of trench fever, frostbite, shellshock and gas gangrene. The Metropolitan Hospital also had a 300 bed annexe for officers on the site, which was run by Matron Isabel Bennett.

After the war it was enlarged to 200 beds and, together with the Royal Army Medical College, became the postgraduate school for medical officers of the Royal Army Medical Corps and British overseas territories as well as the Royal Navy and Royal Air Force. It was the only British institution teaching military surgery.

There were strong ties with Westminster Hospital due to its then proximity (based in Broad Sanctuary and from 1939 in Horseferry Road) and also the Army Medical Service, and there was a joint neoplastic clinic.

In the Second World War the hospital together with its college formed a large site vulnerable to bombing but only received superficial damage. After the war a vascular surgical unit was set up with St Mary's Hospital, Paddington and postgraduate training continued for Army medical officers in surgery, tropical diseases and pathology (for assistance in prevention and diagnosis), while other ranks received more technical medical training.

In 1957 the hospital was extended to 300 beds with two operating theatres and 11 wards including one for children. Male nurses were from the Royal Army Medical Corps and female nurses from the Queen Alexandra's Royal Army Nursing Corps.

After services had transferred to the Queen Elizabeth Military Hospital in Woolwich, the hospital closed in 1977. The Royal Army Medical College remained at Millbank until teaching transferred to the Queen Alexandra Hospital in Cosham near Portsmouth in 2005.

In 2005 Westminster City Council produced a 'conservation audit' of the wider Millbank conservation area. The report described the hospital building as follows:

It has an elaborate Edwardian brick frontage with stone detailing to John Islip Street. There is a feature bow window and decorated gable to the entrance bay and timber sash windows throughout. Attractive pavilion blocks trail off to the east, some have been demolished to allow for extensions to Tate Britain. The chapel remains behind the John Islip Street block. The buildings collectively make a positive contribution to the character and appearance of the conservation area. On Millbank to the north of the Tate is a three story red brick property built as the lodge to the Queen Alexandra Hospital which has since become separated by the extensions to Tate Britain. Built of red brick it has stone facing to the ground floor and stone surrounds to the windows, which retain timber frame sashes. With a slate pitched roof it has a domestic appearance and helps enclose the northern open space to the front of the Tate. Together with the Royal Army Medical Corps buildings it provides a seemly "frame" contributing to the setting for the Tate Gallery.

Part of the hospital site has since been used for an extension of the Tate but most of the buildings remain. These have housed various administration departments of the Tate as well as the library, meeting rooms and the conservation science section. The chapel remains but its stained glass window, depicting the Ascension of Jesus Christ, was carefully removed to the Queen Elizabeth Military Hospital, Woolwich. The area around the Tate, including the former military hospital, the former Royal Army Medical College and other adjacent areas is a conservation area, although as at 2005 only the hospital buildings were not listed.

== See also ==
- Henry MacCormac (dermatologist)
- Timeline of Imperial College School of Medicine
