= George Millington Woodwark =

British cardiologist

- Born: 27 April 1923
- Died: 4 June 2012 (aged 89)
- Education: Westminster Hospital Medical School
- Known for: London medical students at Belsen; Cardiac catheterizations; Canada's first heart defibrillation unit
- Relatives: Sir Arthur Stanley Woodwark (father)
- Medical career
- Profession: Physician
- Sub-specialties: Cardiology

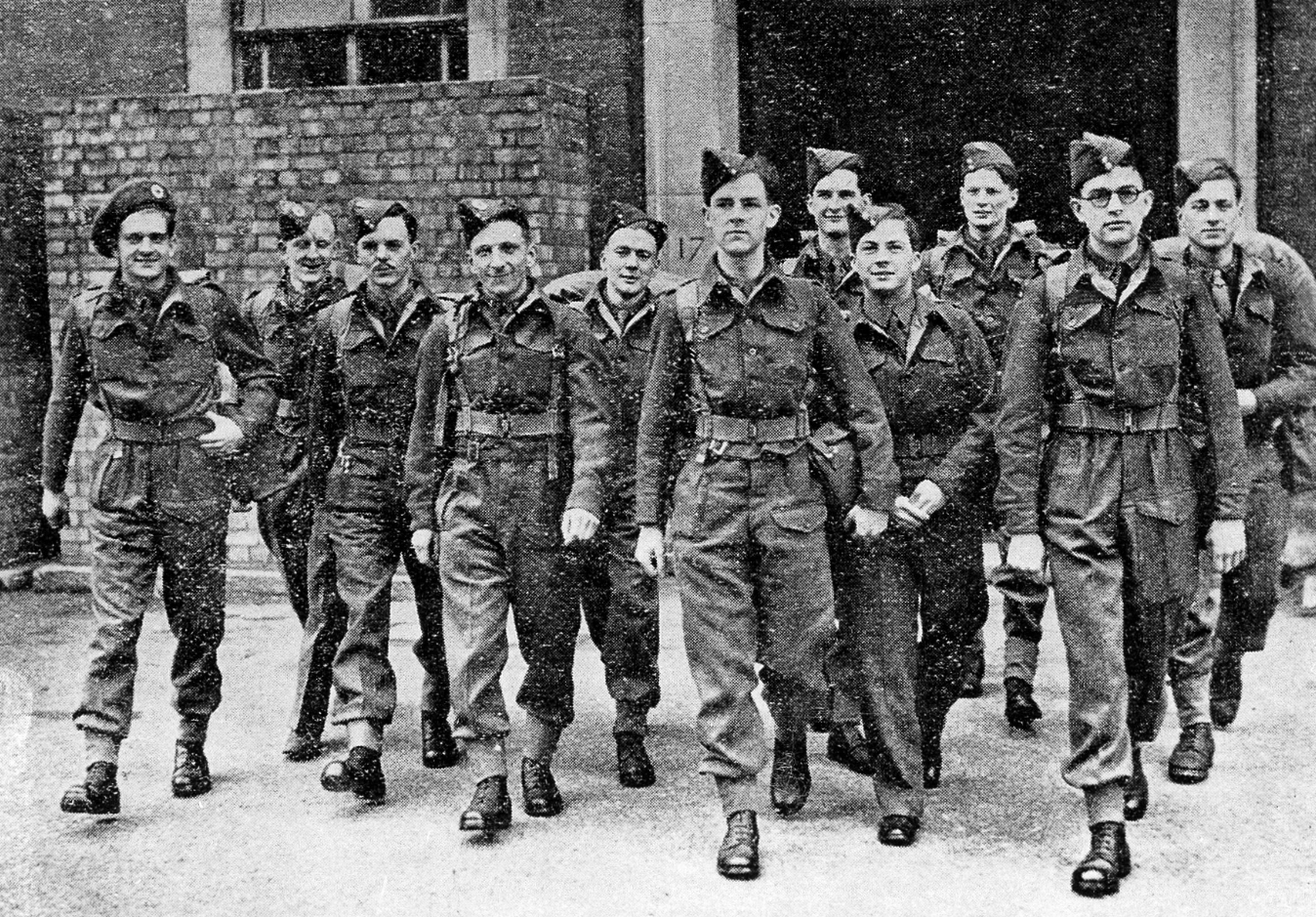
G. Woodwark (First from left), D. Wells, R. Barton, E. Trimmer, R.E. Citrine, K.C. Easton, A.D. Moore, J.R.E. Jenkins, D.P. Bowles, M. Hargrave and L.K. Garstin

George Millington Woodwark (27 April 1923 – 4 June 2012) was a British cardiologist who moved to Vancouver Island, where he established cardiac catheterizations and founded Canada's first heart defibrillation unit.

He was one of the Westminster Hospital medical students who assisted at Bergen-Belsen concentration camp in 1945.

== Early life and education ==
George Millington Woodwark was born on 27 April 1923, the son of Sir Arthur Stanley Woodwark, and a cousin of Sir Peter Bottomley. He was one of the Westminster Hospital medical students who assisted at Bergen-Belsen concentration camp in 1945.

== Career ==
In 1948, he was listed temporary surgeon lieutenant in the Navy. On 21 February 1948, he married Carol Mary Jenkins.

He arrived in New York on 19 June 1958 on the RMS Mauretania en route to Colorado General Hospital, Denver. His ship had departed from Southampton on 13 June 1958 and he was accompanied by his wife Megan.

In the early 1960s, he arrived on Vancouver Island. There he established cardiac catheterizations and founded Canada's first heart defibrillation unit. He taught paramedics at the Royal Jubilee Hospital.

== Death ==
He died on 4 June 2012, survived by his wife Sheila and four children.

== Selected publications ==
- "Electrocardiographic changes in atrial septal defects: Ostium secundum defect versus ostium primum (endocardial cushion) defect". American Heart Journal, Vol. 58, Issue 5 (November 1959), pp. 689–700. doi:10.1016/0002-8703(59)90226-1 PMID 14435176 (With Ray Pryor and S.Gilbert Blount Jr.)
- "Considerations involved in the selection for surgery of patients with ventricular septal defects". The American Journal of Cardiology, Vol. 5, Issue 2 (February 1960), Pages 223–233. doi:10.1016/0002-9149(60)90201-0 PMID 13801649 (With S. Gilbert Blount Jr.)
- "Hospital education program following myocardial infarction". Canadian Medical Association Journal Vol. 106, No. 6 (April 1972), pp. 665–7. PMID 5012230

== See also ==
- List of London medical students who assisted at Belsen
