= Metropolitan Free Hospital =

- City and Hackney (Teaching) District Health Authority
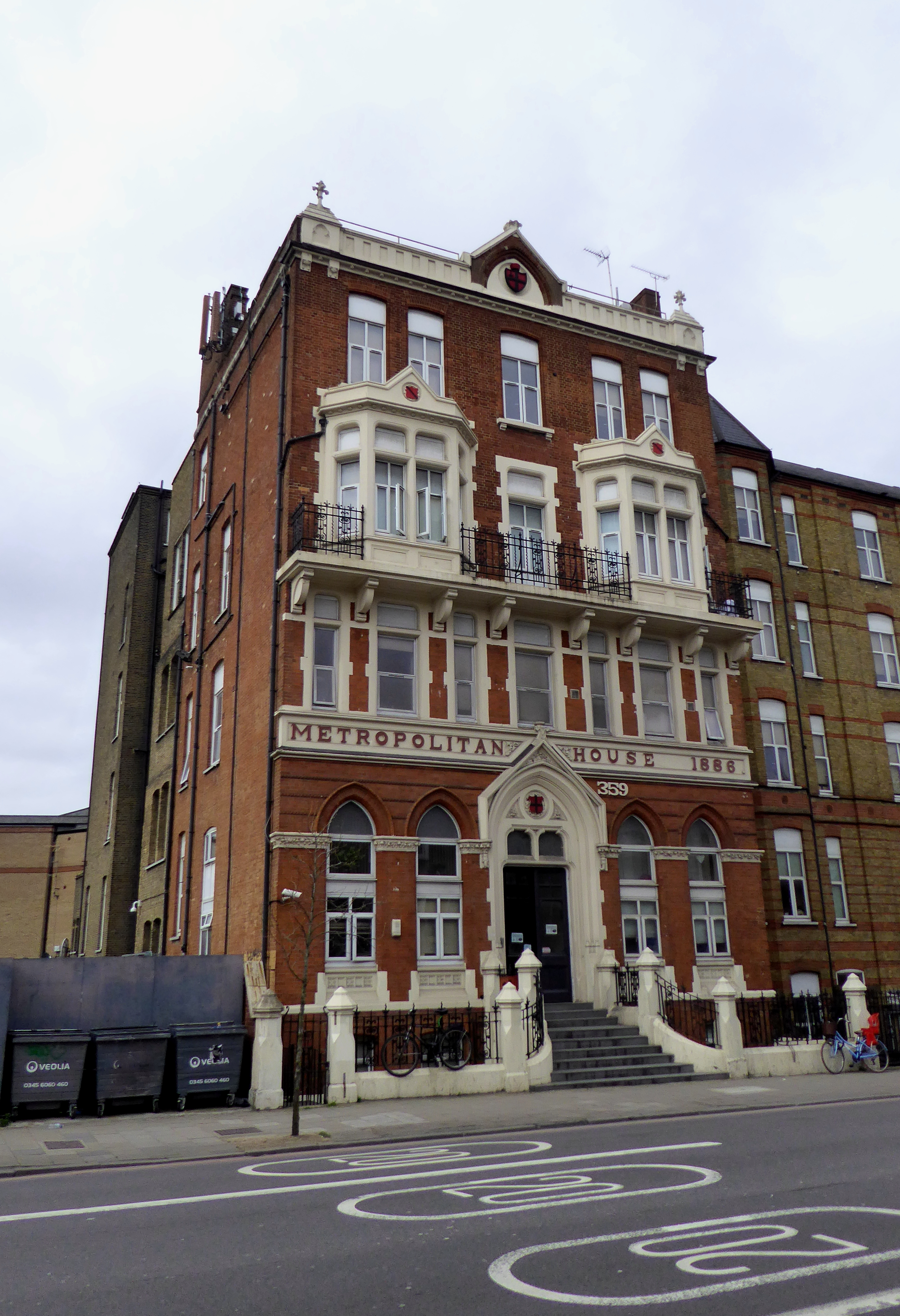
- Metropolitan Free Hospital, in Hackney

- Location within Hackney

Geography
- Location: Kingsland Road, Hackney, England
- Coordinates: 51°32′26.01″N 0°4′36.16″W

Organisation
- Care system: NHS England

Services
- Emergency department: No

History
- Founded: 1836
- Closed: 1977

Links
- Lists: Hospitals in England

The Metropolitan Free Hospital was a London hospital, founded in 1836 and based for most of its existence in Kingsland Road, Hackney. It became part of the NHS in 1948, and closed in 1977, with its residual functions transferring to Barts Hospital.

== History ==
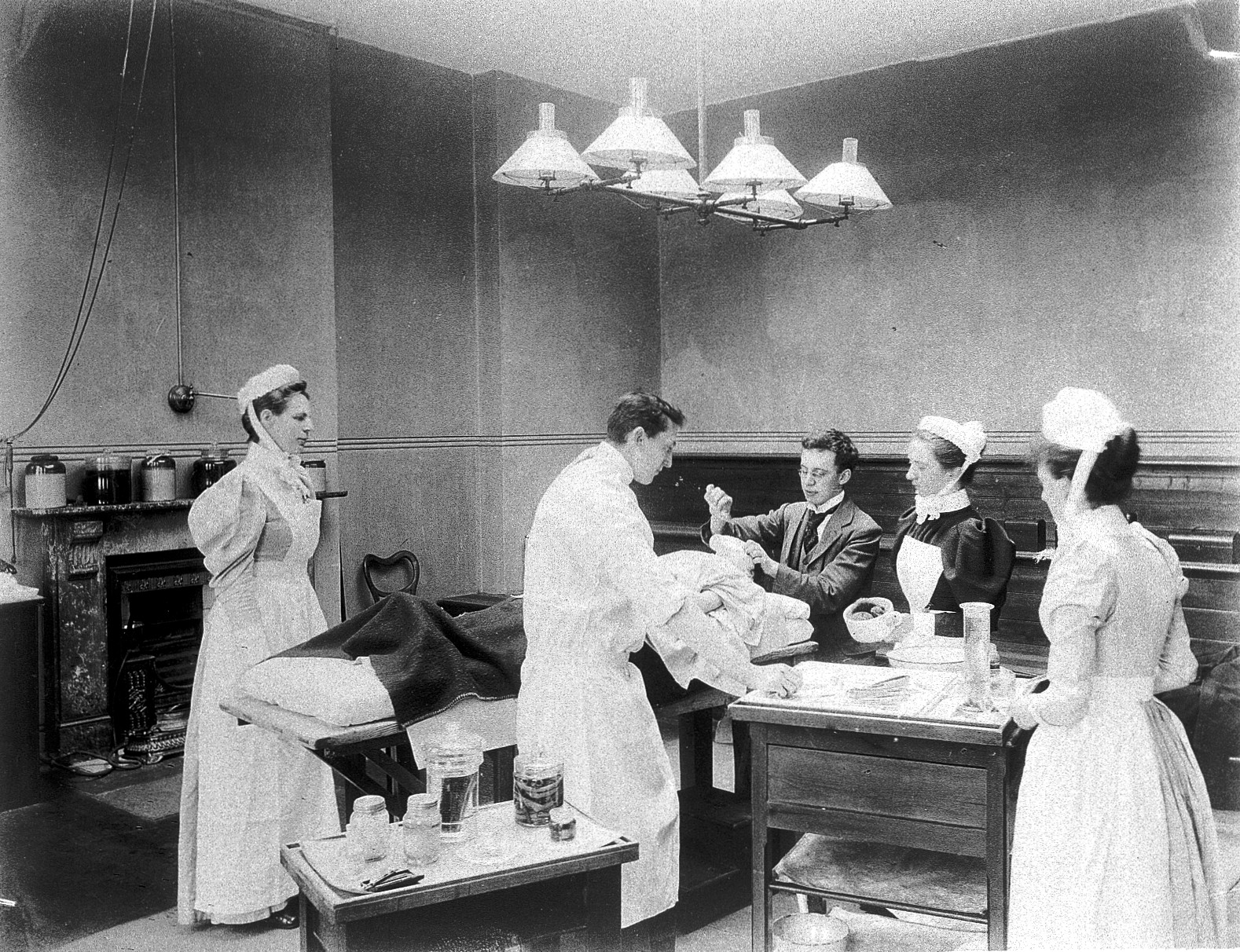
Undated operating theatre photograph from the Kingsland Road site

=== Early years ===
The hospital was founded by Jonathan Fry, a son of Elizabeth Fry, to provide medical treatment for the destitute, in 1836. Its mission was ‘to grant immediate relief to the sick poor of every nation and class whatever may be their diseases, on presenting themselves to the charity without letter of recommendation; such letters being always procured with difficulty and often after dangerous delay’. It was based initially at 29 Carey Street, near Lincoln's Inn, previously the home of the silversmith Richard Cooke. In 1843, Prince Adolphus, Duke of Cambridge sponsored its first inpatient beds.

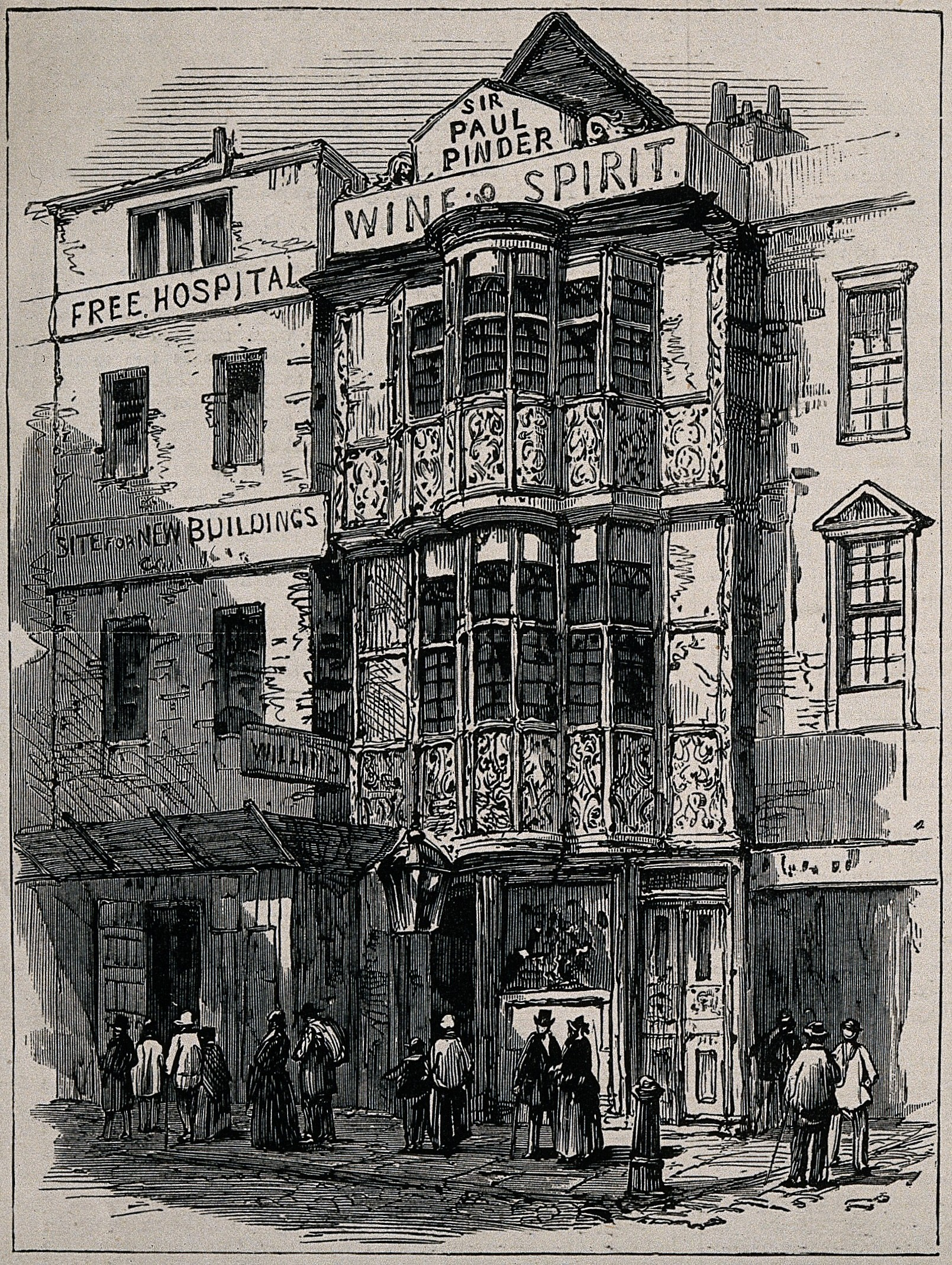
A view of the Sir Paul Pindar's Head, Bishopsgate; on its left is the Metropolitan Free Hospital

In 1850, the hospital moved to 8 Devonshire Square, Bishopsgate, and soon after began to treat inpatients. However, in the 1870s, the Devonshire Square site was wanted by the Great Eastern Railway Company to extend their London terminus, Liverpool Street Station. The hospital sold its premises to the railway for £8,500 in 1876. It moved to 81 Commercial Street, Spitalfields and remained there until 1885 when it found a suitable site on the Kingsland Road.

=== Kingsland Road ===
The hospital operated from a series of buildings on Kingsland Road while a dedicated building was being constructed between 1885 and 1886. Under its new governor, Sir Edmund Hay Currie, it began to charge a small subscription, and so dropped the word ‘Free’ from its title. As the Metropolitan Hospital, it formed a partnership with Anglican nursing order, the Order of All Saints. In 1902 King Edward VII became its patron. The hospital developed specialist services, including a dedicated ward for Jewish patients, and expertise in treating tuberculosis. In 1948 the Metropolitan Hospital became part of the National Health Service. After services were transferred to Barts Hospital, the hospital closed in 1977.

The hospital was then converted into workshops: the derelict state of the nurses' home at the rear of the building, facing De Beauvour Square, was a matter of concern raised by the Hackney Society at their meeting on 2 February 1984. The building was subsequently converted for use as a business centre and hostel.

== Nursing care ==
The Order of All Saints, also known as the Sisters of St Peter's of Kilburn were asked to reorganise the nursing care in 1888 and ran the nursing department until 1895. In 1897 Eva Luckes, Matron of The London Hospital agreed that one of her staff, Mabel Cave RRC (1863–1953) could go there for six months to reorganise the nursing department. Cave took with her several nurses to reorganise and instill Nightingale style nursing. Cave became matron of The Westminster Hospital in 1898.

== Notable staff ==
- Mabel Helen Cave RRC (1963–1953), Matron from 1897 to 1898. Cave trained at The London under Eva Luckes. Cave was sent in as a temporary matron to reform the nursing care at the troubled hospital. In 1898 she was appointed matron of The Westminster Hospital.
- Isabel Catherine Bennett RRC (1862–1932), Matron from 1898 to 1922. Bennett also trained at The London Hospital under Eva Luckes between 1893 and 1895. Bennett was described as being a much-loved matron, who had happy and contented staff. In the First World War, the Metropolitan Hospital was an outpost of Queen Alexandra's Military Hospital in Millbank for wounded and sick officers. During the war her workload increased considerably, as the hospital expanded from 160 civilian beds, with an additional 302 military beds. Bennett remained in charge for over 23 years before retiring in 1922.
