= Faith Edith Smith =

American librarian

Faith Edith Smith (October 10, 1873 – March 5, 1957) was a librarian on the Education Committee of the American Library Association.

== Education and career ==
While at College, Smith was the president of the Young Women's Christian Association from 1894 to 1895 and assistant at Northwestern University Library from 1896 to 1898. She was a graduate student in French (1896–97) and in History (1897–98) and won the Alumni Merit Award in 1896. From 1898 to 1900 she was a student at New York State Library School, where again she was assistant at the Library from 1898 to 1900, and obtained a Bachelor of library science.

Faith Edith Smith was the principal of the Philosophy and Religion Department at Los Angeles Public Library. She was on the Education Committee of the American Library Association and was a member of the California Library Association and was a member of the Philosophical Union. In 1922, Smith co-edited Best Books of 1921 Selected for a Small Public Library.

== Personal life ==
Faith Edith Smith was born on October 10, 1873, in Aurora, Illinois, the daughter of William B. Smith and Mary Margaret Ferner. Smith attended Aurora High School and then obtained a Ph. B. at Northwestern University, where she joined the University Women's Club.

Faith Edith Smith started as librarian at Sedalia, Missouri, in 1900, and lived at 219 Clark St., Aurora. She then moved to California, in 1917 and lived at 5007 Townsend Ave., Los Angeles, California.

Smith died on March 5, 1957, and is buried at Spring Lake Cemetery, Aurora.
