= Edith Smith (nurse) =

British nurse

Edith Smith OBE, ARRC (d. 1980) was a British nurse and matron for over thirty years of a central London teaching hospital, Westminster Hospital, and as such was prominent in the development of the nursing profession in the UK.

== Early life and early nursing career ==
Edith Smith trained first in gynaecological nursing in Birmingham in 1903 and then in general nursing at Westminster Hospital, London, 1908-1910. Her name was included on the College of Nurses Ltd Register of nurses in 1917, the precursor to that held by the General Nursing Council

== Later nursing career ==
Edith Smith was appointed matron to Westminster Hospital London in 1915 and retired in 1947. She was notable for her leadership in the civil nursing service through the World War 1 and World War II, receiving in recognition the Royal Red Cross (second class) in 1918 and Officer of the British Empire award in 1943. The re-development of the Westminster Hospital incorporated a larger nurses' home and training school for nurses. Smith, with other officials welcomed the Prince of Wales, later the Duke of Windsor to lay the foundation stone to the nurses' home, and Queen Mary, mother of King George VI to open the new training school, named in her honour. She was the first president of the Westminster Hospital League of Nurses

Smith was active at a national level in the development of the nursing profession: an invited attendee of 1916 national conference on proposed legislation for State Registration and the Nursing College, an executive member of the Nurses Insurance Society and also The National Council of Nurses of Great Britain.

Her retirement presentation event at the hospital was attended by King George VI and his consort Queen Elizabeth. Edith Smith died in 1980.

== Awards ==
- Royal Red Cross (second class) in 1918
- Officer of the British Empire award in 1943.
