= Isabel Bennett (politician) =

Belizean politician and nurse

Isabel Bennett, also known as Isabel Bennett-Moody, is a Belizean nurse and politician, affiliated with the People's United Party (PUP).

Bennett was born in Ladyville. She studied at the Belize School of Nursing and then studied nursing at the University of the West Indies in Mona, Jamaica. She later became president of the Nurses Association of Belize. Since 2008, she has also been a lecturer in the Department of Nursing at the University of Belize.

In 2014, she was involved in a serious accident when she was travelling on a bus on the George Price Highway in Belmopan and was hit by a towhead truck.

Bennett was appointed to the Senate of Belize for the PUP on 30 August 2019, replacing Valerie Woods.

In 2024–5, Bennett Moody was involved in talks in the US and UK about artificial intelligence, digital colonialism and ethics in technology.

In November 2024, Bennett was one of the Belizean politicians who visited Kyiv to speak with Volodymyr Zelenskyy to strengthen diplomatic ties between the countries.
