= Isabel Bennett (nurse) =

British nurse (1862–1932)

Isabel Catherine Bennett RRC
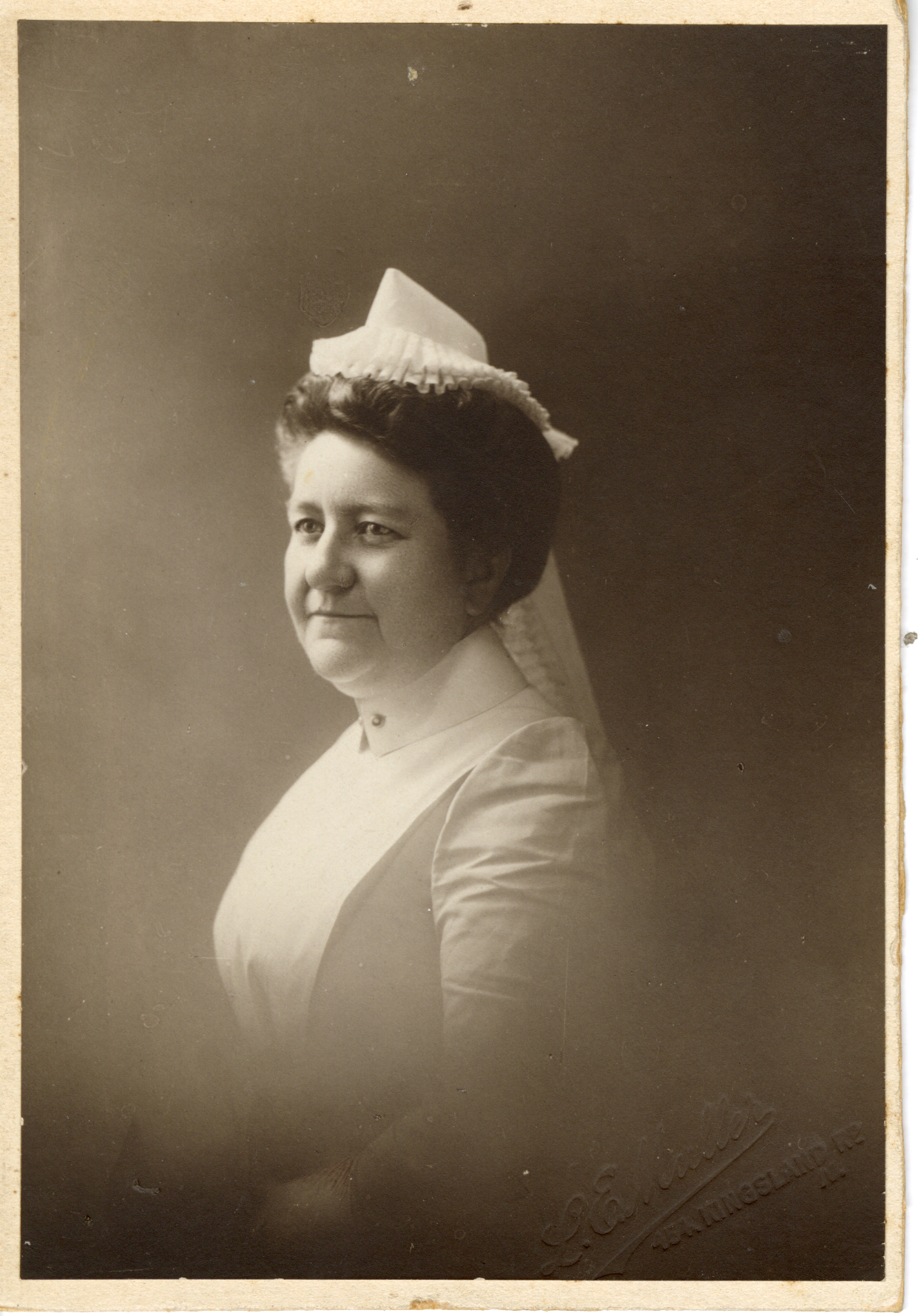
- Born: 1862; Birmingham
- Died: 1932 (aged 69–70); Findon, Sussex
- Education: The London Hospital
- Occupations: Matron and Nursing Leader

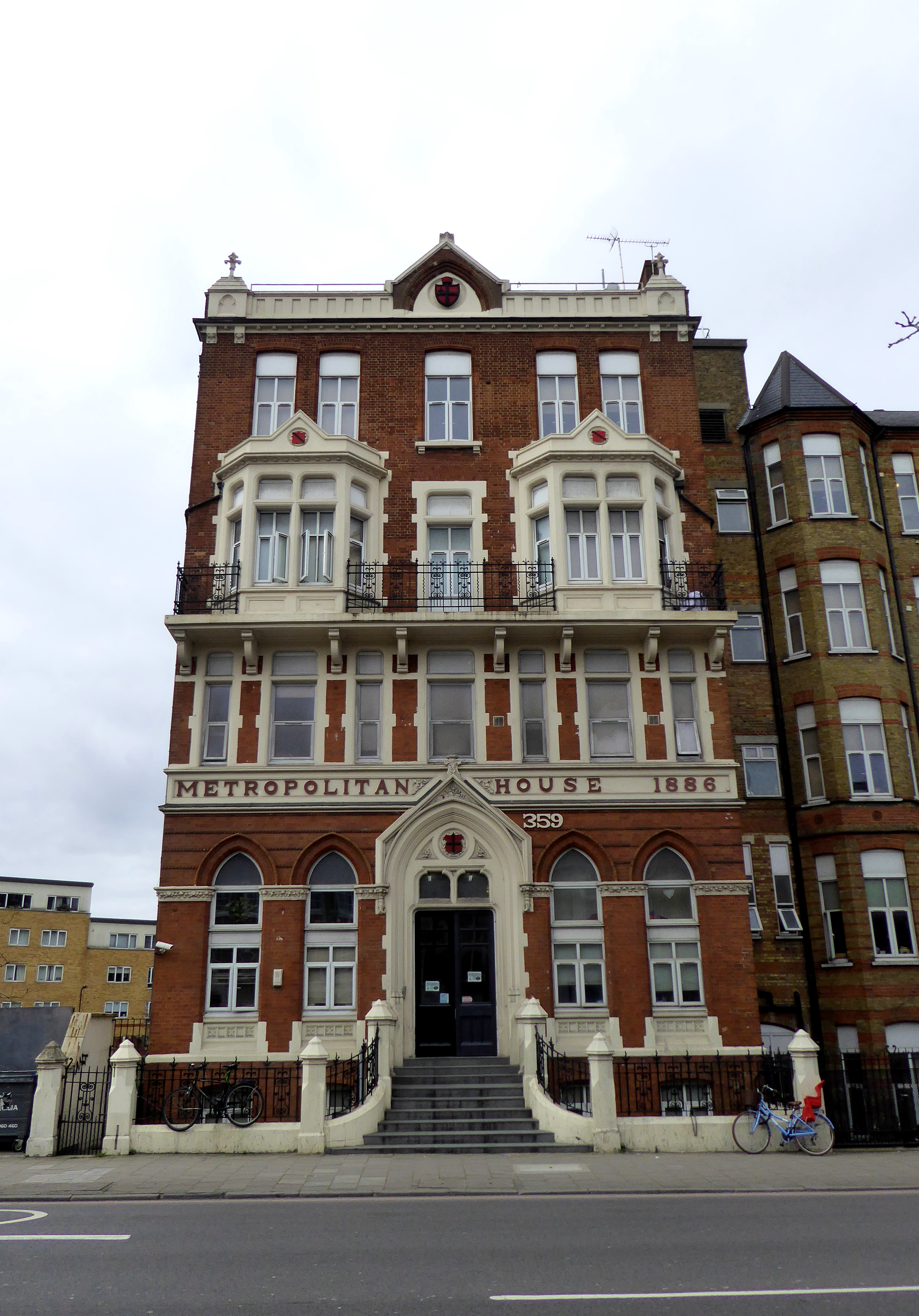
The front of the Metropolitan hospital

Isabel Catherine Bennett RRC (1862–1932) was matron of the Metropolitan Free Hospital for twenty-three years. During the First World War she was also matron in charge of a 300-bed annexe for wounded and sick officers from Queen Alexandra's Military Hospital in Millbank, also at the Metropolitan Hospital.

== Early life ==
Bennett was born in Birmingham in early 1862, and baptised Isabella 'Bella' Catherine Bennett at St John's Church, Ladywood on 19 February 1862. She was the second eldest child of at least nine born to Alfred and Elizabeth Bennett. Bennett's father took over the family roasting jack manufacturing business in 1865, and by 1871 employed nearly 30 people. Bennett was educated with her sister Mary Louisa 'Polly', firstly at Miss Warren's School in Birmingham, and secondly at Handsworth Ladies College. After she left school Bennett helped at home and in the family business, and provided first aid to injured workers. Bennett's father died in 1883 when she was 21, and her mother ran the business. But the company declined and Bennett started nurse training when she was 31.

== Nursing career ==
Bennett trained at The London Hospital under matron Eva Luckes between October 1893 and November 1895. Immediately after finishing her training she became a holiday sister (relief), and then a ward sister, until she was recommended for the matronship of the failing Metropolitan Hospital in 1898.

Bennett became matron in September 1898 and stayed in post until her retirement in 1922. Whilst she was matron, she updated the nurses training, and conditions at the hospital. During the First World War 302 beds were added to the hospital to provide care for wounded and sick officers from Queen Alexandra's Military Hospital in Millbank, London.

Whilst she was matron, her sister Polly, who had founded the Steyne School in Worthing died at the hospital in October 1913.

== Retirement ==
Bennett had a serious stroke after the war and had to retire in 1922 after 23 years as matron. She died on 4 September 1932 at Steyne Cottage in Findon, Sussex, and her funeral was held three days later.

== Honours ==
Bennett was awarded the Royal Red Cross in 1917.

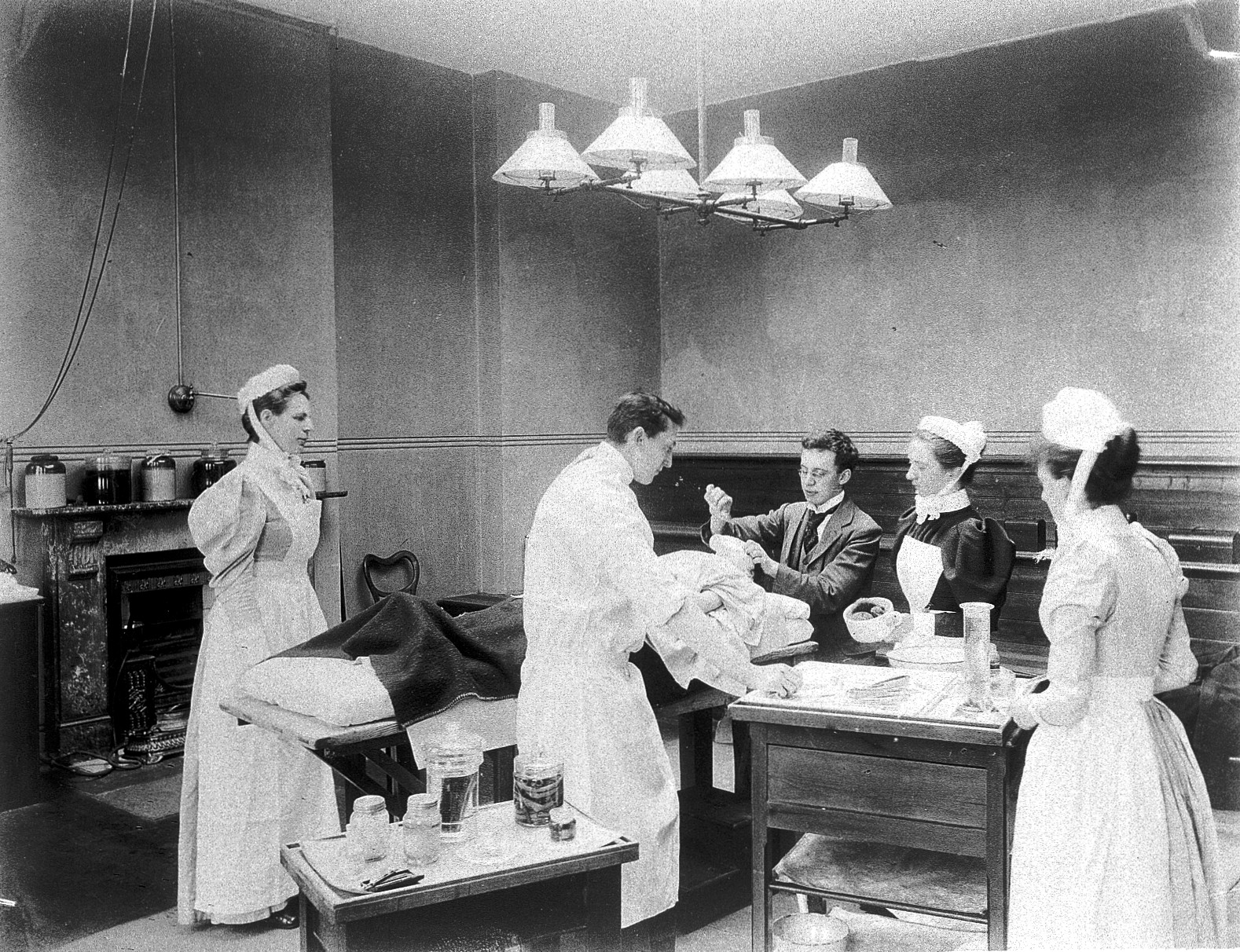
Nurses at the Metropolitan Free Hospital
