= Westminster Hospital =

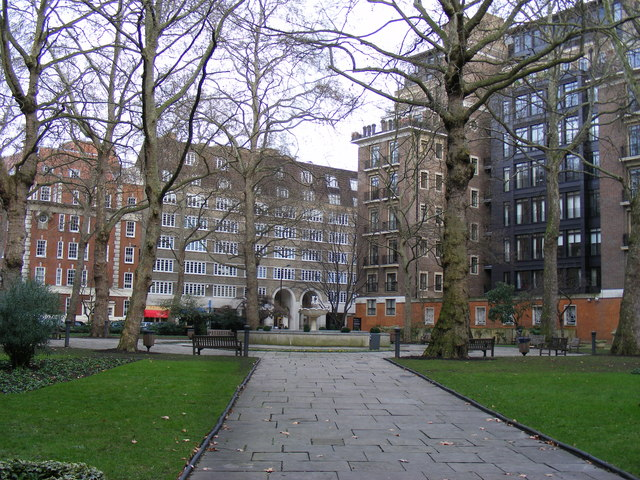
- View of the building in Westminster (on the right) which was home to Westminster Hospital from 1939 to 1992: it has since been converted into flats

- Location within Westminster

Geography
- Location: Westminster
- Coordinates: 51.4945°N 0.1280°W

Organisation
- Care system: NHS England
- Type: General

History
- Founded: 1719
- Closed: 1992

Westminster Hospital was a hospital in Westminster, England, founded in 1719. In 1834 a medical school attached to the hospital was formally founded. In 1939 a newly built hospital and medical school opened in Horseferry Road, Westminster. In 1994 the hospital closed, and its resources were moved to the new Chelsea and Westminster Hospital at the old St Stephen's Hospital site on Fulham Road.

== History ==
=== Foundation ===
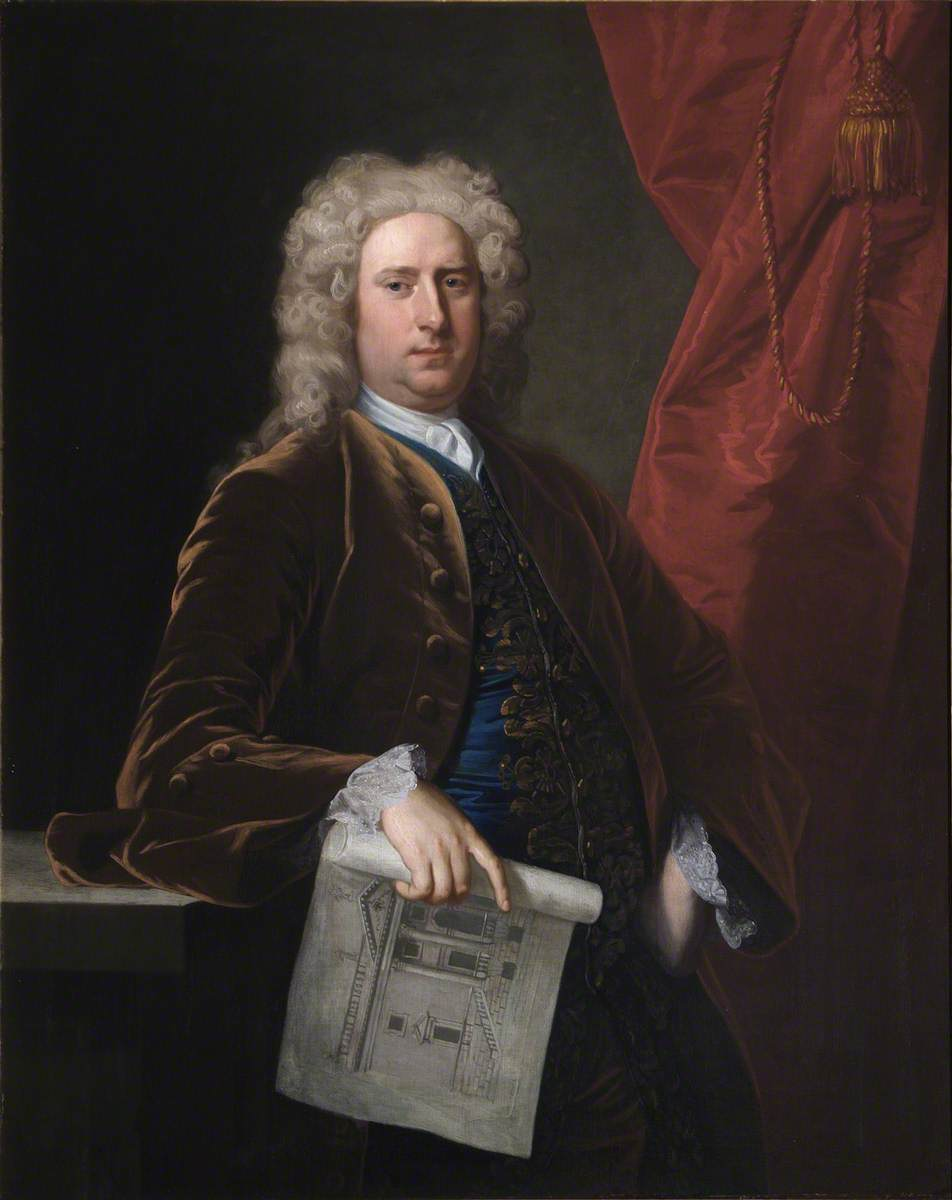
Henry Hoare the Good, portrait by Michael Dahl

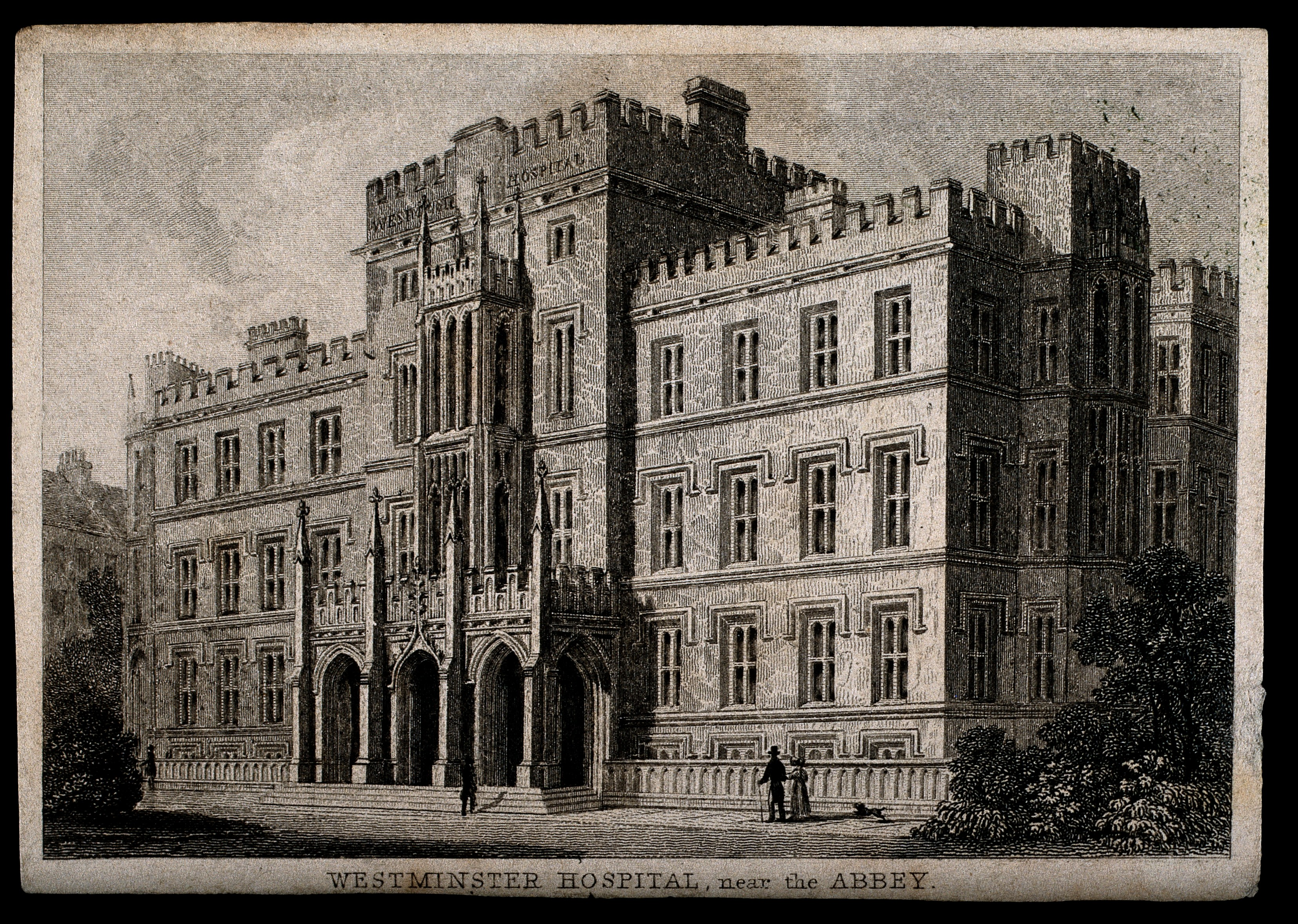
19th century engraving of the building at Broad Sanctuary which was home to Westminster Hospital from 1831 to 1939

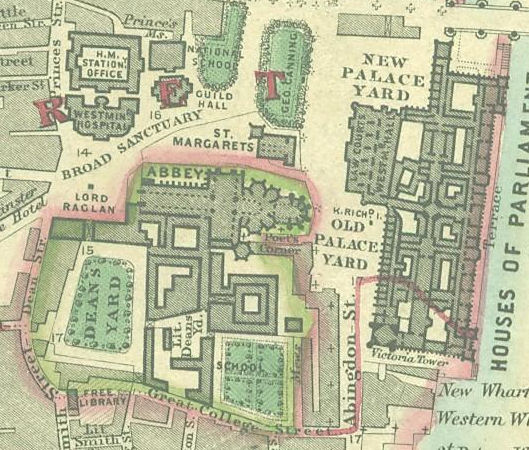
Map of the location of the Westminster Hospital (top left) relative to Westminster Abbey and the Palace of Westminster Edward Stanford's map London, 1862

The Westminster Hospital was established in 1719 as a charitable society "for relieving the sick and needy at the Public Infirmary in Westminster", and promoted by Henry Hoare (1677–1725), otherwise "Good Henry", son of Sir Richard Hoare and a partner in Hoare's Bank, and his associates the writer William Wogan, a vintner called Robert Witham, and the Reverend Patrick Cockburn.

In 1719, a house was rented in Petty France, to accommodate the new Infirmary for the Sick and Needy, which opened in 1720 with 10 beds.

The following document, which may be styled the first annual report of this institution, dated 1720, hung framed and glazed on the wall of the secretary's room as at about 1878:

"Whereas a charitable proposal was published in December last (1719), for relieving the sick and needy, by providing them with lodging, with proper food and physick, and nurses to attend them during their sickness, and by procuring them the advice and assistance of physicians or surgeons, as their necessities should require; and by the blessing of God upon this undertaking, such sums of money have been advanced and subscribed by several of the nobility and gentry of both sexes and by some of the clergy, as have enabled the managers of this charity (who are as many of the subscribers as please to be present at their weekly meetings), to carry on in some measure what was then proposed:—for the satisfaction of the subscribers and benefactors, and for animating others to promote and encourage this pious and Christian work, this is to acquaint them, that in pursuance of the foresaid charitable proposal, there is an infirmary set up in Petty France, Westminster, where the poor sick who are admitted into it, are attended by physicians, surgeons, apothecaries, and nurses, supplied with food and physick, and daily visited by some one or other of the clergy; at which place the society meets every Wednesday evening for managing and carrying on this charity, admitting and discharging patients, &c."

=== Moves in the eighteenth century ===
The hospital grew to 31 beds by 1724, necessitating a move in that year to Chappell Street (later renamed Broadway).

In 1733, a disagreement between the Governors and the medical staff led to a mass exodus of medical staff, who went on to set up what became St George's Hospital. Meanwhile, the Infirmary continued with its existing Governors and moved to new premises in Buckingham Gate in 1735, where it was known as the Westminster Infirmary for the Sick and Infirm. By 1757 there were 98 beds and the site was expanded with building work and the acquisition of neighbouring property. By 1760, it was known simply as the Westminster Hospital, as it remained for the rest of its existence.

=== Broad Sanctuary site ===
In 1831, a new site at the Broad Sanctuary opposite Westminster Abbey was acquired, and a new hospital building was completed and opened in 1834, of an embattled quasi-Gothic character, erected by Messrs. Inwood at a cost of £40,000. The hospital was situated by the Broad Sanctuary and the northern side of the nave of Westminster Abbey, between the Sessions House and Victoria Street, and accommodated about 200 in-patients, and the total number of patients relieved annually, in an 1878 account, was about 20,000. According to the same 1878 description, "Patients are admitted by order from a governor, except in cases of accident, which are received, without recommendation, at all hours of the day or night". It was the first subscription hospital erected in London, and was incorporated in 1836.

The original building was substantially rebuilt in 1895, and a clinical laboratory was opened by Lord Lister in 1899. In 1924, the Westminster Hospital closed for one year while the building was substantially refurbished. The Marie Celeste Children's Ward was added to the hospital in the 1920s but demolished in the 1952. It contained 12 panels of nursery rhyme tiles which had been paid for by fundraising in the 1920s by the Girl Guides and Brownies.

=== Move to Pimlico ===
In 1938, the Westminster Hospital moved again. The new building was in St John's Gardens, Westminster, and included The Queen Mary Nurses' Home (sleeping 250) and a Training School, both opened in 1938, followed in 1939 by the opening of the new Westminster Hospital building opposite, in Horseferry Road. The new building was hit by bombs in 1940 and suffered from a nearby landmine explosion in 1941, but continued to operate.

Upon the foundation of the National Health Service in 1948, the Westminster Hospital was placed in a new "Westminster Group of Hospitals", which included, also, the Gordon Hospital, the Westminster Children's Hospital and the All Saints' Hospital. In 1950, they were joined by Queen Mary's Hospital, Roehampton, bringing the total number of beds in the Westminster Group to 1,090.

The Wolfson School of Nursing was built in Vincent Square in 1960, and a new wing for the hospital building, linked by a bridge, was opened in 1966.

In 1990, the Westminster Hospital had 403 beds.

=== Transfer to the Chelsea and Westminster Hospital ===
In 1992, the Westminster Hospital closed, and in 1993 re-opened, as the Chelsea and Westminster Hospital, in a new purpose-built building in Fulham Road. As well as the name, continuity is provided by portraits from the old building which hang in the Board Room of the new; together with a Veronese painting in the new hospital chapel and some of the stained-glass there.

Meanwhile, the old buildings were converted into flats called Westminster Green, which preserve the façade of the original hospital building. The previous buildings in Broad Sanctuary survived until destroyed by a fire in 1950; the Queen Elizabeth II Conference Centre, in a completely different style, now stands on the site.

== Notable patients ==
- Clement Attlee, a former Prime Minister of the United Kingdom, died at the hospital from pneumonia in 1967.
- The Conservative Member of Parliament Airey Neave died at the hospital on 30 March 1979, after being badly wounded by a car bomb as he drove out of the nearby House of Commons that day.
- Tommy Cooper (1921-1984), a British comedian was brought to the hospital and later pronounced dead after a heart attack while taking part in "Live on Her Majesty's," which was being transmitted from Her Majesty's Theatre in Westminster.
- Malvina Longfellow (1889–1962), a silent movie actress of the 1920s, died at the Hospital on 2 November 1962, having been admitted from her flat in South Street, Mayfair.
- Charles Rennie Mackintosh (1868-1928), Scottish architect, visited the hospital in 1928 to have his tongue cancer surgically removed. However he died just a few weeks or months later.
- Ernest Tidyman, American author of Shaft and Academy Award winning screenwriter of The French Connection, also died in Westminster Hospital on 14 July 1984 of a perforated ulcer and complications. Tidyman was in London for a production meeting about a film to be made in Europe.

== Notable staff and students ==
- Claudius Amyand (1660–1740) was a French surgeon who performed the first recorded successful appendectomy.
- Mabel Helen Cave RRC (1863–1953), Matron and Lady Superintendent from 1898 until she resigned through ill health in 1913. She trained at The London Hospital under Eva Luckes. In 1908, whilst Cave was matron, indoor food relief was instigated for the very poorest of the out-patients attending the hospital.
- William Cheselden (1688–1752) was an English surgeon and teacher of anatomy and surgery.
- Benjamin Hoadly (1706–1757) was an English physician, known also as a dramatist.
- Charles D. F. Phillips (1830–1904) was a British medical doctor and author.
- Eva Luckes CBE RRC DStJ (1854–1919), trained at the Westminster Hospital, 1877-1878, matron of The London Hospital, 1880 to 1919 and innovator in nurse education and practice.
- Dame Sarah Mullaly, first female Archbishop of Canterbury was a ward sister at the hospital.
- Rosalind Paget, DBE, ARRC (1855–1948), worked at the Westminster Hospital in 1876 was a noted British nurse, midwife, reformer and first superintendent of the Queen's Jubilee Institute for District Nursing renamed the Queen's Nursing Institute
- Edith MacGregor Rome RRC (1870–1938) trained as a nurse at the Westminster Hospital and later was Matron-in-Chief of the British Red Cross Society and President of the Royal College of Nursing
- Edith Smith, d. 1980, matron (1915–1947) and prominent in the development of the nursing profession in the UK
- John Snow (1813–1858) was an English physician and a leader in the development of anaesthesia and medical hygiene.
- Lavinia Young, Matron 1951–1966, elected Mayor of Shaftesbury 1970.

== Arms ==
Coat of arms of Westminster Hospital

Notes
Granted 1 February 1940
Escutcheon
Azure a cross patonce between three martlets Or a chief of the last thereon on a pale of the first between two roses Gules each surmounted by another Argent barbed and seeded Proper a portcullis chained of the second ensigned with the Imperial Crown also Proper.

== See also ==
- List of hospitals in England
