= Parks and open spaces in the Royal Borough of Kensington and Chelsea =

The Royal Borough of Kensington and Chelsea, an Inner London borough, has responsibility for some of the parks and open spaces within its boundaries. Most of them are relatively small: many are the typical London square, built to service the houses around that square. Two of the larger open spaces both form part of the "Magnificent Seven" cemeteries, being those at Brompton and Kensal Green. The parks are policed by the Royal Borough of Kensington and Chelsea Parks Police.

Some of the other open spaces in the Borough are:

- Addison Gardens
- Albert Bridge Garden
- Alec Clifton-Taylor Memorial Gardens
- Alexander Square (North and South)
- All Saints Churchyard and St Thomas More Gardens
- Allen Hall Seminary Garden
- Arundel and Elgin Communal Garden
- Arundel and Ladbroke Gardens
- Ashburn Gardens
- Ashburn Place Gardens
- Avondale Park
- Avondale Park Gardens
- Barkston Gardens
- Barlby Gardens
- Battersea Bridge Gardens
- Bina Gardens East
- Bina Gardens West
- Blenheim and Elgin Crescents Garden
- Bolton Gardens
- Chelsea Embankment Gardens
- Chelsea Physic Garden
- Emslie Horniman's Pleasance
- Grand Union Canal (Paddington Branch): along the towpath
- Holland Park: here there is an Ecology centre
- Kensington Gardens
- Kensington Memorial Park
- Little Wormwood Scrubs
- Lots Road Park
- Ranelagh Gardens
- Royal Hospital Chelsea: the grounds of which are used by the annual Chelsea Flower Show
- Yalta Memorial Garden: A small garden between Cromwell Gardens and Thurloe Square, SW7. It contains the Twelve Responses to Tragedy memorial.

The area has the additional advantage of extending into Kensington Gardens and thus neighboring Hyde Park.

Little Wormwood Scrubs is one of 11 parks throughout Greater London chosen to receive money for redevelopment by a public vote in 2009. The park received £400,000 towards better footpaths, more lighting, refurbished public toilets and new play areas for children.

== See also ==
- Royal Parks of London
