= Rising Universe =

Large kinetic water sculpture in Horsham, West Sussex, England

Coordinates: 51°03′48″N 0°19′56″W

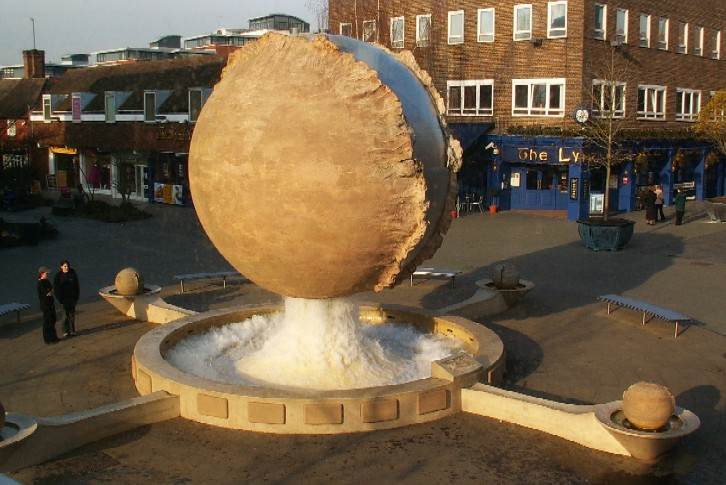
The water sculpture in action

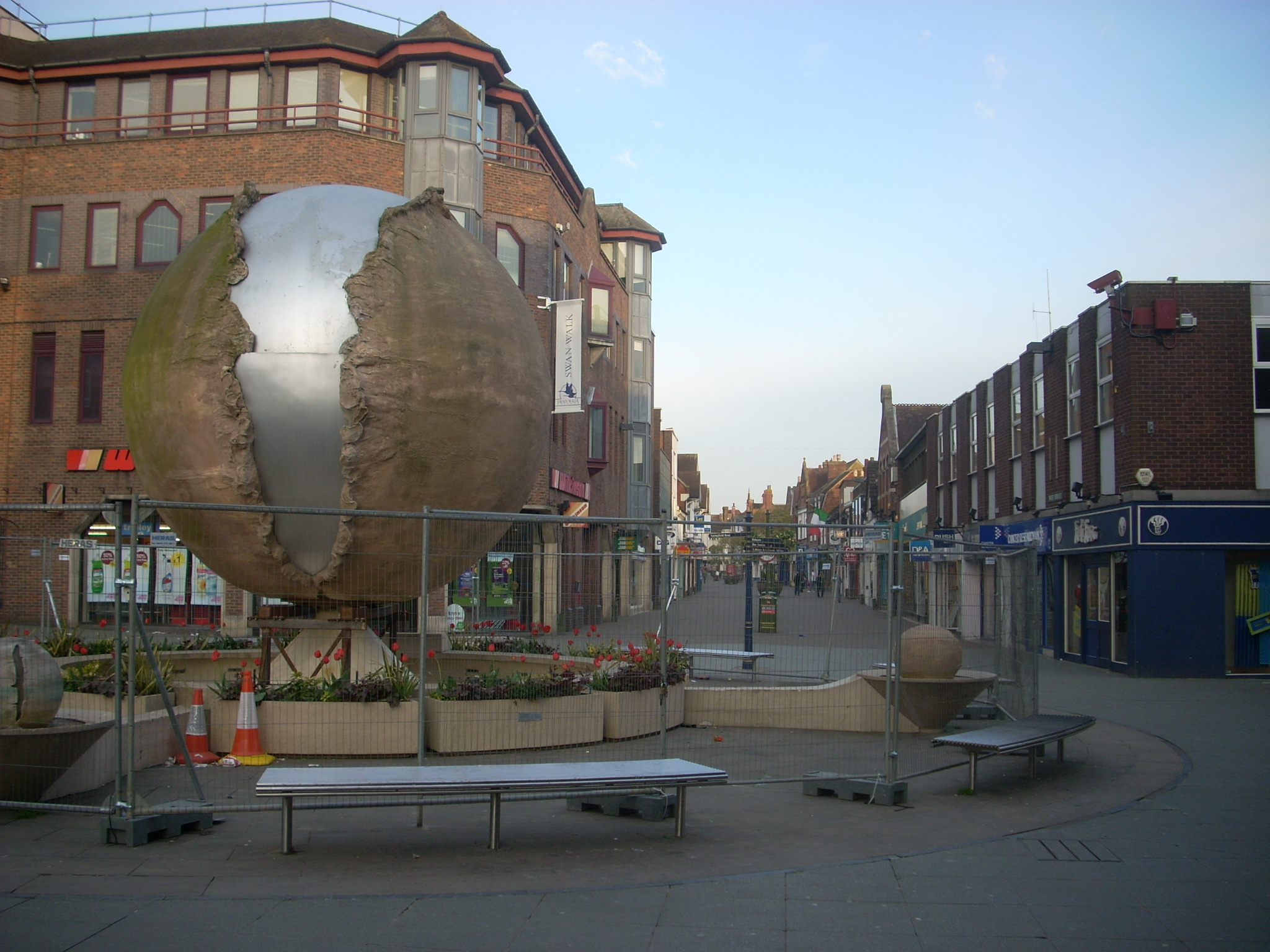
The fountain fenced off for repairs in April 2009

Rising Universe, more commonly known locally as the Shelley Fountain, was a large kinetic water sculpture in Horsham, West Sussex, England. It was created by the sculptor Angela Conner and installed in 1996 to commemorate the bicentenary of the birth of the poet Percy Bysshe Shelley, who was born near Horsham. Conner refers to the work by the name Cosmic Cycle, which is the name originally attached to the work on a brass plaque. The fountain was dismantled and removed from its location in the town centre in June 2016 after district councillors voted that it had "reached the end of its serviceable life".

== Description ==
The fountain consisted of a large globe mounted on a pillar. The globe was designed to fill with water pumped from below: as the sphere filled it would descend slowly (over a period of about five minutes) after which a torrent of six and a half tons of water was released into the basin below; it then quickly rose and the cycle started over again. It was 45 ft across at its base, standing 28 ft high.

An extract from Shelley's 1817 poem "Mont Blanc" appeared on a plaque on the sculpture:

The everlasting universe of things

Flows through the mind, and rolls its rapid waves,
Now dark – now glittering – now reflecting gloom –
Now lending splendour, where from secret springs
The source of human thought its tribute brings
Of waters, – with a sound but half its own,
Such as a feeble brook will oft assume
In the wild woods, among the mountains lone,
Where waterfalls around it leap for ever,
Where woods and winds contend, and a vast river

Over its rocks ceaselessly bursts and raves.

== History ==
The fountain was switched off in the spring of 2006 to conserve water due to water shortages in the south of England. Although the water was recycled, the fountain lost 180 gallons of water a day to filtration and evaporation. It was switched on again in November 2006. In May 2008 the fountain was turned off again due to the failure of its main hydraulic cylinder. On 19 January 2009 the fountain was fenced off for repairs.

In October 2013 a local newspaper attempted to create a debate about the future of the sculpture largely on the grounds that it is expensive to maintain. The fountain had long been a controversial landmark and some local residents used the debate to criticise the sculpture as ugly or not to their taste. There were also representations of support for Conner's work but the future of the piece was said to be in question, at least in its location in the town centre.

In October 2014, the council asked the public for their views on how they would like to see the Bishopric area improved. Some 86% of the respondents were strongly in favour of removing the sculpture.

== Removal ==
In April 2016 it was announced that members of the Horsham District Council would vote on whether or not to scrap the fountain, which had cost more than £200,000 to maintain and repair since its installation. On 27 April, councillors voted overwhelmingly to remove the 20-year-old water feature.

In response to the Council's decision, Angela Conner said that a "concerted effort has been made to slowly have the sculpture literally disintegrate ... I can't believe the lack of care that's taken place" adding that in her opinion "the council have used hugely expensive and inefficient people to run the thing at vast cost to the people of Horsham". However, Councillor Jonathan Chowen, cabinet member for leisure and culture, said that while it was "a sad moment", it had become too expensive "to continue to pour money into the fountain if we can't get the water feature to work [...] Just to leave the globe standing there is unfair to the art it was".

The fountain was dismantled and removed by contractors in June 2016 with the exception of the basin, which is to be incorporated into a decorative planting and re-landscaping scheme. A replacement sculpture will be the subject of a public consultation yet to be announced.

== See also ==
- Park West — more Angela Conner sculptures
- List of public art in Horsham
