= Angela Conner =

English sculptor

Angela Conner FRSS
- Born: 1935 (age 90–91)
- Known for: Rising Universe
- Spouse: John Bulmer
- Awards: Fellow of the Hereford College of Arts
- Patrons: Barbara Hepworth
- Website: www.angelaconner.co.uk

Angela Conner FRSS (born 1935) is an English sculptor who works in London. Conner has exhibited internationally and has large scale sculptures in public and private collections around the world.

== Sculpture ==
In her early life as a sculptor, Conner assisted Barbara Hepworth. She works in a wide range of materials including marble, steel, stone and perspex, with many of her sculptures incorporating water as an integral feature. Conner's kinetic sculptures are concerned with utilizing "natural elements like water, sun, gravity or wind to create mobiles that entice viewers to stop and watch their gentle movement". The movement of Conner's sculptures entirely depend on the natural forces they react with and not electricity. "If mankind were suddenly to die out, and if as a result there were no artificial power, the sculpture would still continue its pattern of opening and revealing, then closing and embracing"

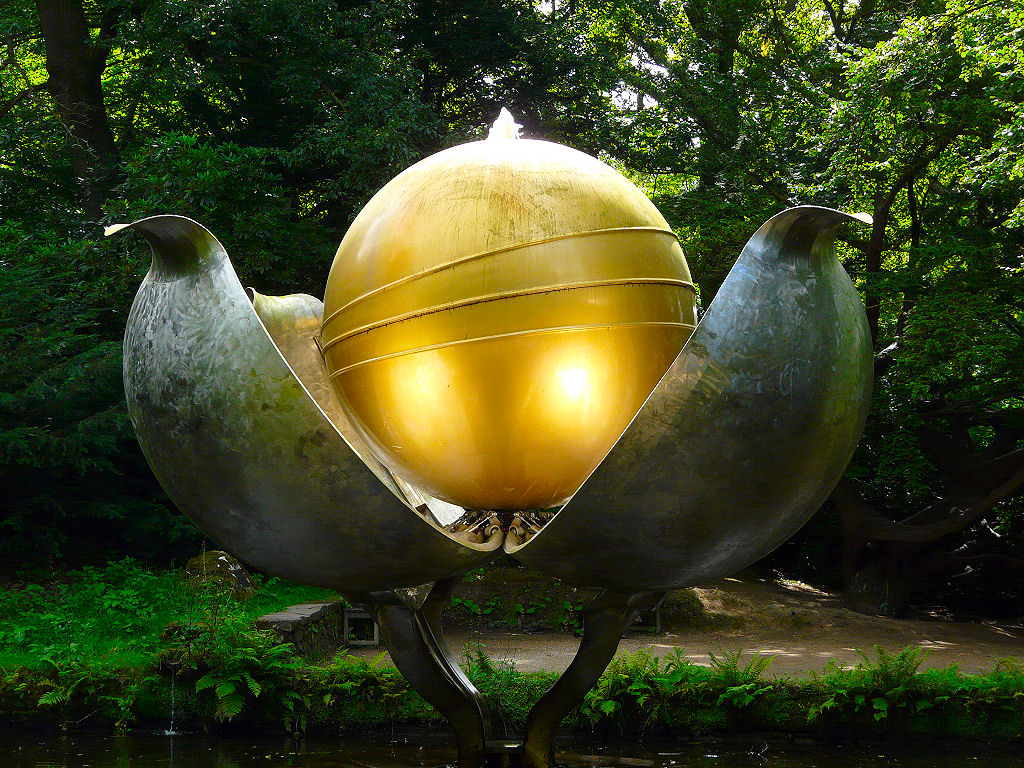
'Revelation' kinetic water sculpture by Angela Conner, at Chatsworth House

Unfortunately, despite claims that her sculptures would still continue to function sans human life, in reality electricity powers her sculptures and they are connected to a water utility rather than a spring or artesian well. In her long career, Conner has created many notable large scale kinetic sculptures which are entirely powered by natural forces. Conner's 129 ft water and wind sculpture 'Wave' at Park West Dublin is possibly the tallest kinetic water and wind sculpture in Europe.

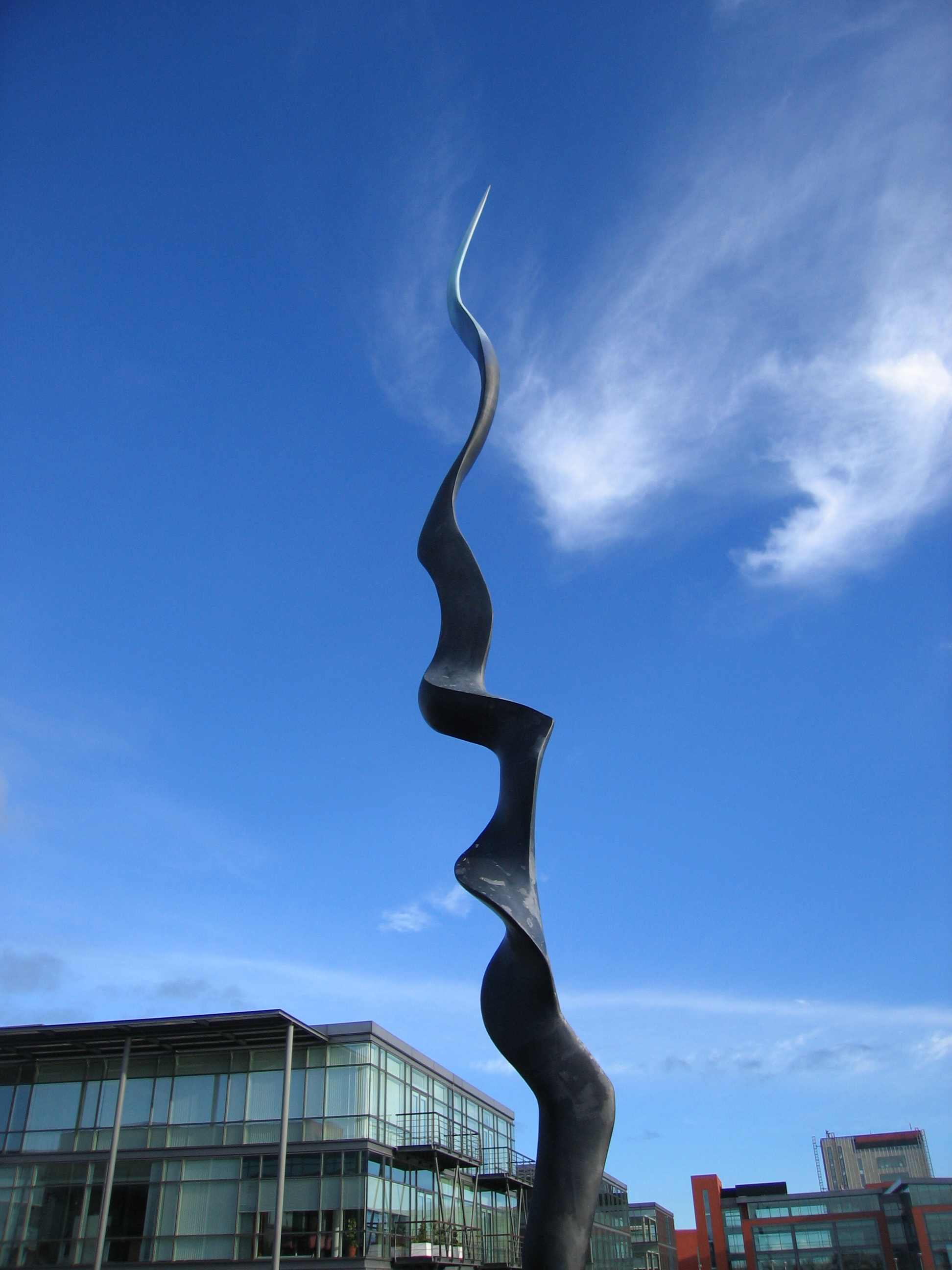
'Wave' 129ft wind and water sculpture by Angela Conner, at Park West in Dublin

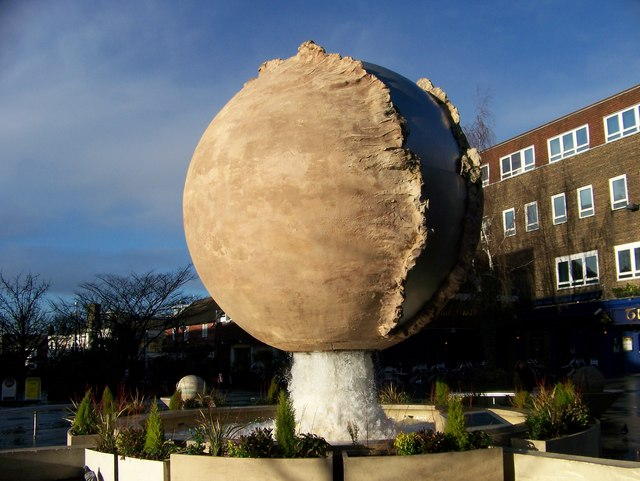
Rising Universe (Shelley Fountain) in Horsham, West Sussex, a kinetic water sculpture by Angela Conner, since demolished

Conner is also well known for her enigmatic figurative work modeled from life, which "on an intimate and personal level probe the character behind the mask". Conner has created posthumous portraits, but prefers to work from life, -"working from life is a form, perhaps, of an osmosis. It has to be done by instinct; its not something you can do intellectually." Chatsworth House has a collection of 14 bronze busts located in the grounds, including portraits of Lucian Freud, the Eleventh Duke of Devonshire, Harold Macmillan, Roy Strong, HRH the Prince of Wales, Camilla Parker-Bowles and John Betjeman. Conner was commissioned to sculpt from life Queen Elizabeth II by the Knights of the Garter to mark the Queen's 80th birthday. Conner's statue of Laurence Olivier playing Hamlet was commissioned to celebrate the centenary of his birth and is located on the South Bank opposite the Royal National Theatre.

In 1982 Conner created a memorial fountain to honour those repatriated as a result of the Yalta Conference following World War II. These were Russian and Eastern European people who were forcibly repatriated to the USSR, often facing torture and execution. The first memorial from 1982 was a tilting water sculpture made of Hopton Stone, located on the north side of Thurloe Square opposite the Vicitoria and Albert Museum. It was repeatedly damaged, so Connor raised funds for a second memorial, Twelve Responses to Tragedy, which was dedicated in 1986. The monument stands in the Yalta Memorial Garden in South Kensington.

She has work in a number of US public collections including the Jewish Museum, New York and the Carnegie Museum of Art in Pittsburgh. Her work Quartet, for Heinx Hall Plaza Pittsburg, uses the weight of water flowing to make the four stainless steel shapes move in a regular rhythm.

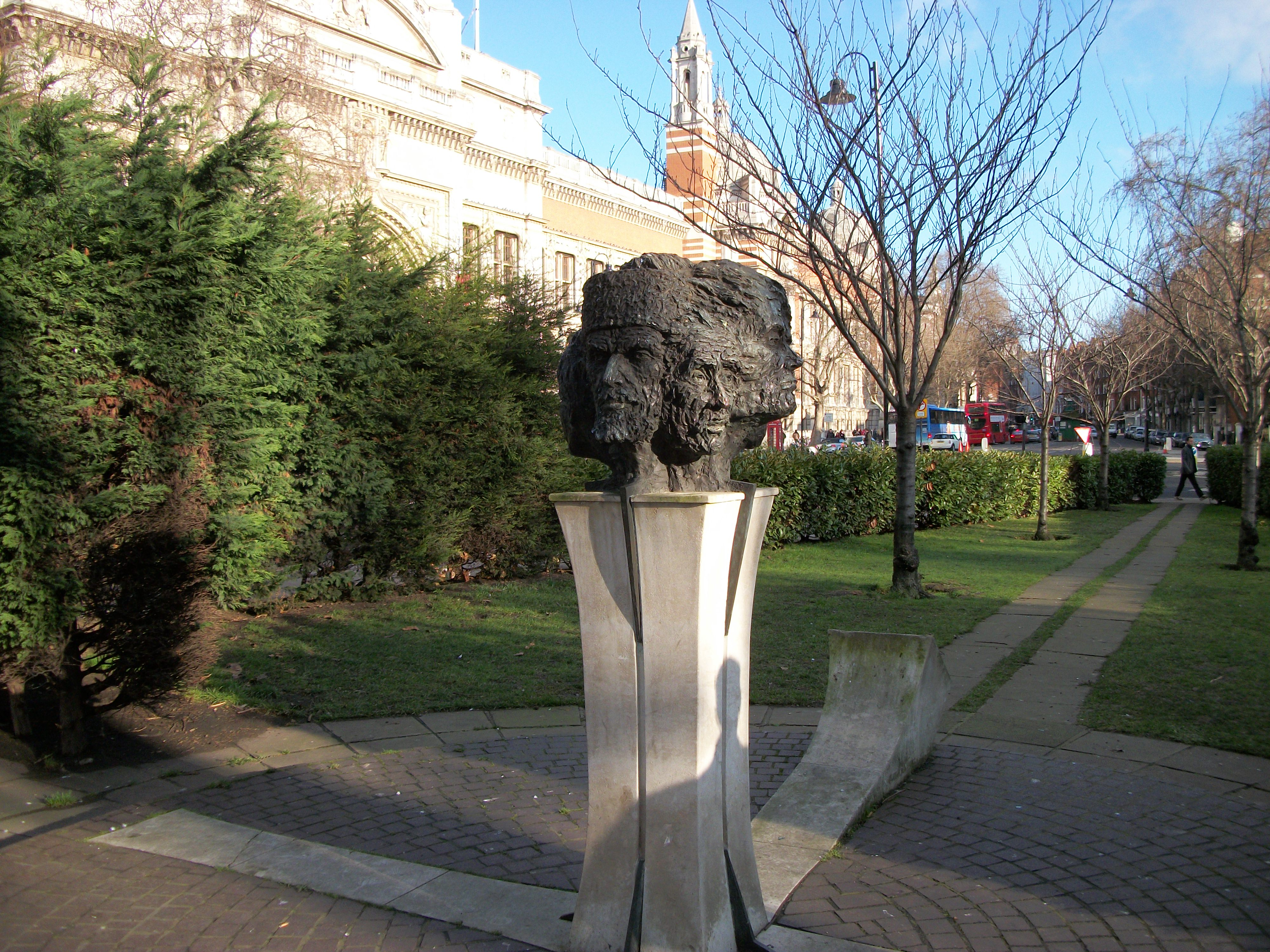
Conner's 12 busts atop the Twelve Responses to Tragedy memorial.

== Commissions ==
=== Kinetic sculptures ===
- 'Revelation', Chatsworth House, Derbyshire, England
- Rising Universe, also known as Cosmic Cycle or the Shelley Fountain, Horsham, West Sussex, England (demolished 2016)
- 'Big Tipper', Bad Driburg Spa Gardens, Germany
- 'Libra', Lovells, London
- 'Wave', Park West, Dublin, Ireland
- 'Threshold', Darlington Arts Centre, Darlington, County Durham, England
- 'Arpeggio', Heinz Hall Plaza, Pittsburgh, USA
- 'Life Force', Boughton House, Northamptonshire, England.
- 'Poise', Chesterfield, England; Park West, Ireland; Chattanooga, USA
- 'Tipping Triangles', Aston University, Birmingham, England
- 'Renaissance', Hatfield House, Hertfordshire, England

=== Figurative work ===
- Queen Elizabeth II, Commissioned by the Knights of the Garter for The Queen's 80th birthday
- Laurence Olivier Statue, National Theatre, South Bank, London
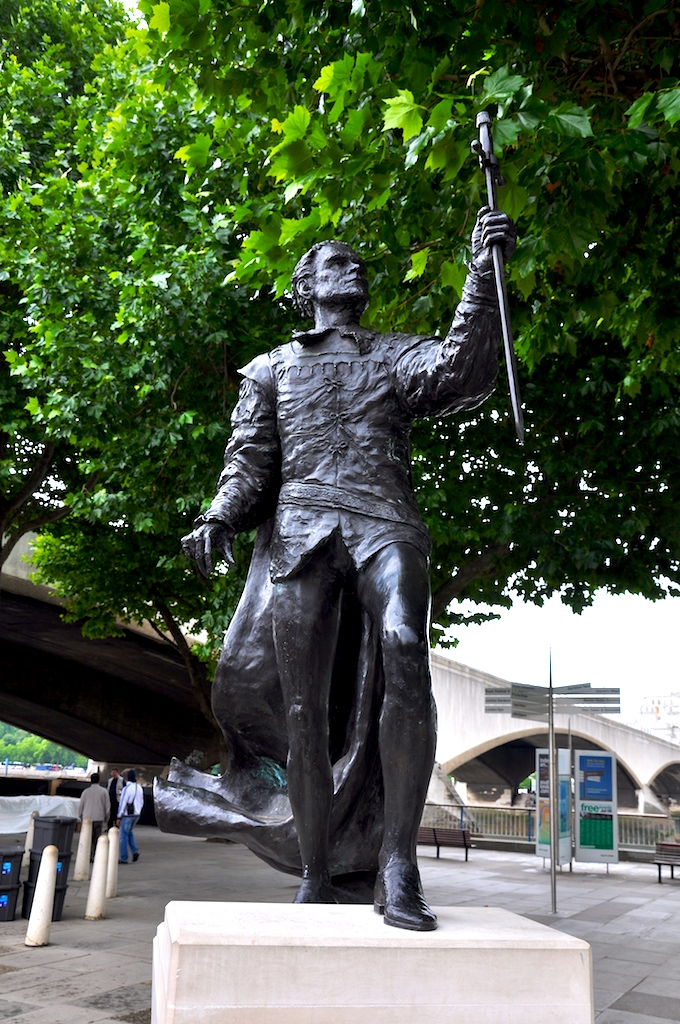
  Statue of Laurence Olivier, South Bank, London
  for the centenary of Olivier's birth

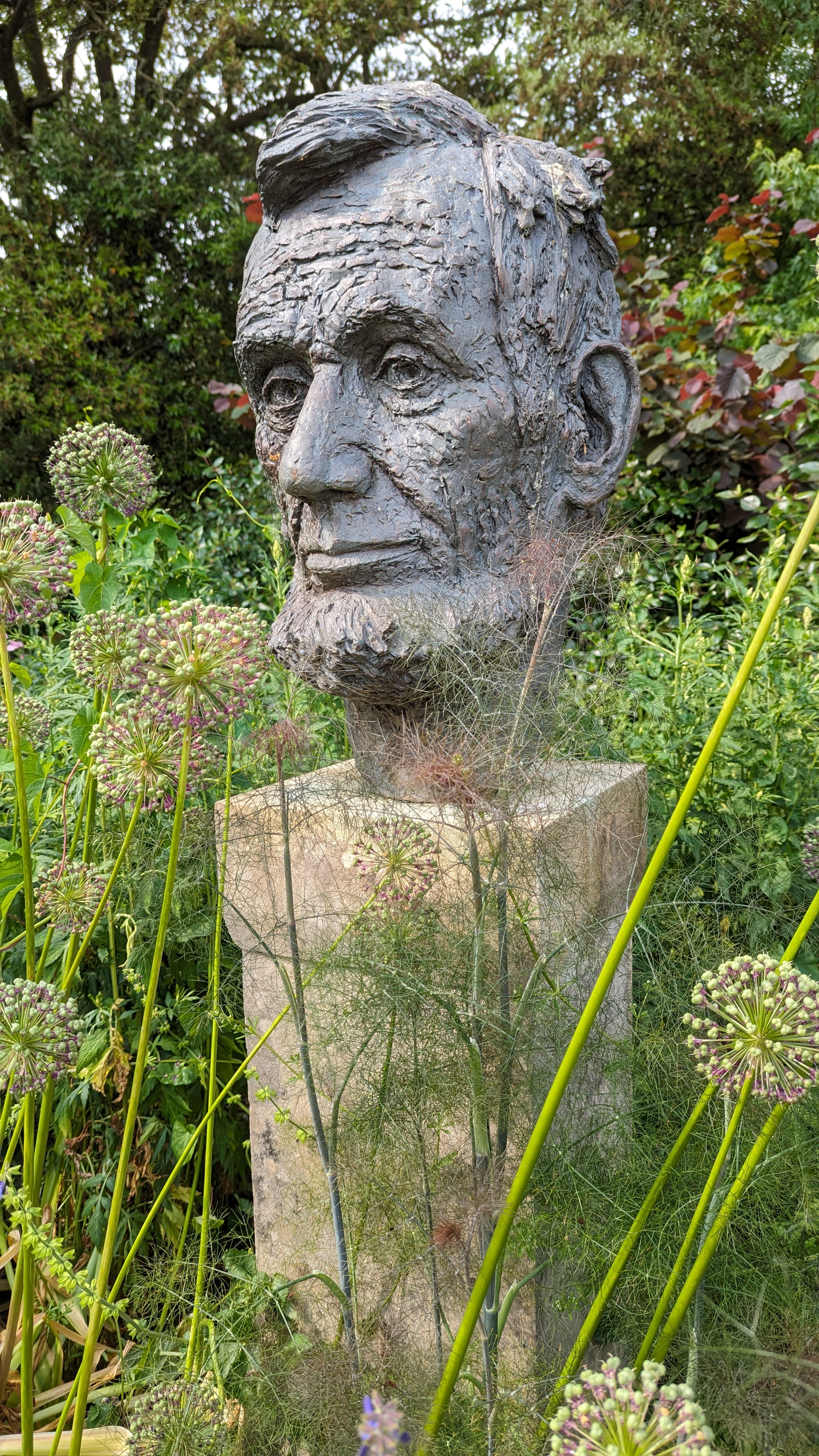
Abraham Lincoln statue by Angela Conner at the American Museum and Gardens in Bath

- The Queen Mother, Cheltenham Racecourse
- Charles de Gaulle, Carlton Gardens, London
- David Stirling, Doune, Scotland, and Hereford, England
- Elisabeth Frink, Bronze Head, Chatsworth House
- Abraham Lincoln, bronze head, American Museum and Gardens near Bath, Somerset
- Noël Coward Statue, at Firefly Estate, Jamaica
- Roy Strong
- Collections 14 of Angela Conner's Bronze Busts at Chatsworth House

== Exhibitions ==
=== Solo shows ===
- American Museum and Gardens, near Bath 2018
- Galerie Piece Unique, Paris 2008
- Inner Temple Gardens, Embankment, London 2004
- 'The Chaos Factor', Browse and Darby, London 1989
- 'Sculptures for Landscape', Browse and Darby, London 1986
- Hirschl Gallery, Cork St, London
- Library and Museum of the Performing Arts, Lincoln Centre, New York 1971
- The Economist Plaza, London

=== Group shows ===
- Sculpture in the Garden 2014: 'The Visionary Landscape of Professor Sir Robert Burgess', Leicester University 2014
- 'Elemental', Burghley Sculpture Garden 2014
- 'A Celebration of Modern British Sculpture' Beaux Arts Gallery, Cork St, London 2012
- The Jerwood Collection, Ragley Hall 2011

== Awards and honours ==
- Kinetic Art Organisation Award 1st Prize
- Allianz Business 2 Art Award for Wave sculpture in West Park, Dublin, Ireland
- American Institute of Architects, Honor Award for Sculpture and Co-design of Plaza Garden, Heinz Hall Pittsburgh U.S.A. 1985
- British Council Award for Refurbishment to Town Centre
- Fellow of the Royal Society of Sculptors (FRSS)
- 2013 Fellow of the Hereford College of Arts
- Pratt Legends Award, New York 2016.
- Shortlisted for 2018 Marsh Award for excellence in public fountains for 'Renaissance', Hatfield House, Hertfordshire. UK

== Personal life ==
Conner is married to the photographer John Bulmer who often videos and photographs her sculptures. The couple live at Monnington on Wye, where they breed and train Morgan horses.

== See also ==
- David Stirling
- Public Monuments and Sculpture Association
