= Ardscoil Rís =

Ardscoil Rís may refer to:

- Ardscoil Rís, Dublin, a boys' secondary school in Dublin
- Ardscoil Rís, Limerick, a boys' secondary school in Limerick
