= Aleeta Raugust =

Canadian convicted cat killer (born 1997)

- Born: Aleeta Raugust; December 14, 1997 (age 28); Calgary, Alberta, Canada
- Known for: Torturing and killing domesticated cats
- Motive: Ailurophobia, Psychopathy
- Criminal charges: Animal abuse, Property damage

Details
- Victims: Nine domesticated cats.
- Locations: Calgary, Alberta

Aleeta Raugust (born December 14, 1997) is a Canadian convicted of being a serial killer of cats. In March 2023, Raugust pled guilty in the Alberta Court of Justice to ten criminal charges – nine of which were related to animal abuse – and a single count of threatening property damage. On September 15, 2023, Justice Mike Dinkel sentenced Raugust to 6.5 years in prison, the longest sentence in Canadian history for animal abuse and a lifetime animal prohibition order. Raugust admitted to torturing nine cats of which she killed seven. Raugust advised the Calgary Police Service to victimizing other cats, adopted from Kijiji, by throwing them into the river. These attacks occurred in Calgary, Alberta, Canada from 2018 to early 2023.

== Prison sentence ==
Aleeta Raugust's 6.5 year jail sentence was the longest for animal abuse ever recorded in Canadian history, significantly eclipsing the previous record of three years. In Justice Dinkel's sentencing statement he advised the sentence for the ten counts would have exceeded twelve years; however, he did not want the sentence to be “crushing for a youthful offender.” The justice noted many aggravating factors in her offences, but noted her cooperation with police, citing Raugust's support of the facts was required to prove the case. Justice Dinkel stated “As much as I may find personally the actions of Raugust to be abhorrent and unconscionable, my duty is to focus on the need for denunciation and deterrence, and balance that with the principle of restraint” [...] “Simply put, I must apply the law.” After handing down his sentence, Dinkel addressed Raugust directly: “Ms. Raugust, the prognosis for you is not great. Feel free to prove them wrong. Good luck.”

== Mental health ==
Raugust underwent a psychiatric assessment and was approved to stand trial by a psychiatrist practicing at the Peter Lougheed Hospital. The assessment was large and described Raugust as psychopathic and suicidal. Justice Dinkel stated “In the end, Raugust was found to be a psychopath and sociopath with bleak hope for rehabilitation” [...] “I also find that Raugust’s moral blameworthiness is very high based on the results of the psychiatric report, which concludes that she is a psychopath with moderate to high likelihood to reoffend.”

Paragraph 227 of the court decision states:

227. Turning to Lockwood's Checklist for Factors in the Assessment of Dangerousness in Perpetrators of Animal Cruelty, at page 28 as for where Raugust falls in this assessment, the report notes that she may be at a high risk of violently offending against vulnerable and -- individuals such as children, the elderly, and the disabled. The report makes particular emphasis of her comments with respect to the abortions that I just mentioned. The report notes: (as read) "Ms. Raugust perpetrated animal violence against victims that are small, harmless, and non-threatening by virtue of species and size, suggesting that Ms. Raugust may gain a sense of power and control through violence against those least likely to retaliate."

— Justice Dinkel

In January 2023, after being admitted to the Peter Lougheed Centre, Raugust advised police and her probation officer that she intended to burn down her former residence on 20th Avenue Southwest in Calgary.

“I’m getting so angry and I’m starting to fantasize about hurting people when I get angry. And I don’t want to fantasize about that” [...] “I have a plan if I’m released from here and that’s why doctors won’t let me go,” [...] “It’s because all I want to do is go buy a bunch of weed and smoke that, get an extra-large pizza and eat that and then I want to get some kerosene and a box of matches and set my building on fire and be in the room when the boiler explodes.”

— Aleeta Raugust

After Raugust pled guilty and before sentencing Justice Mike Dinkel ordered Raugust, who was being held at the Calgary Remand Centre, to undergo another psychiatric assessment and risk assessment at the Southern Alberta Forensic Psychiatry Centre.

== See also ==
- Ailurophobia, excessive fear or hate of cats.
- Croydon Cat Killer
- Human interaction with cats
- Stephen Bouquet, serial cat killer.
