= Beaumont, Dublin =

Suburb of Dublin, Ireland

Beaumont Beaumont
- Suburb
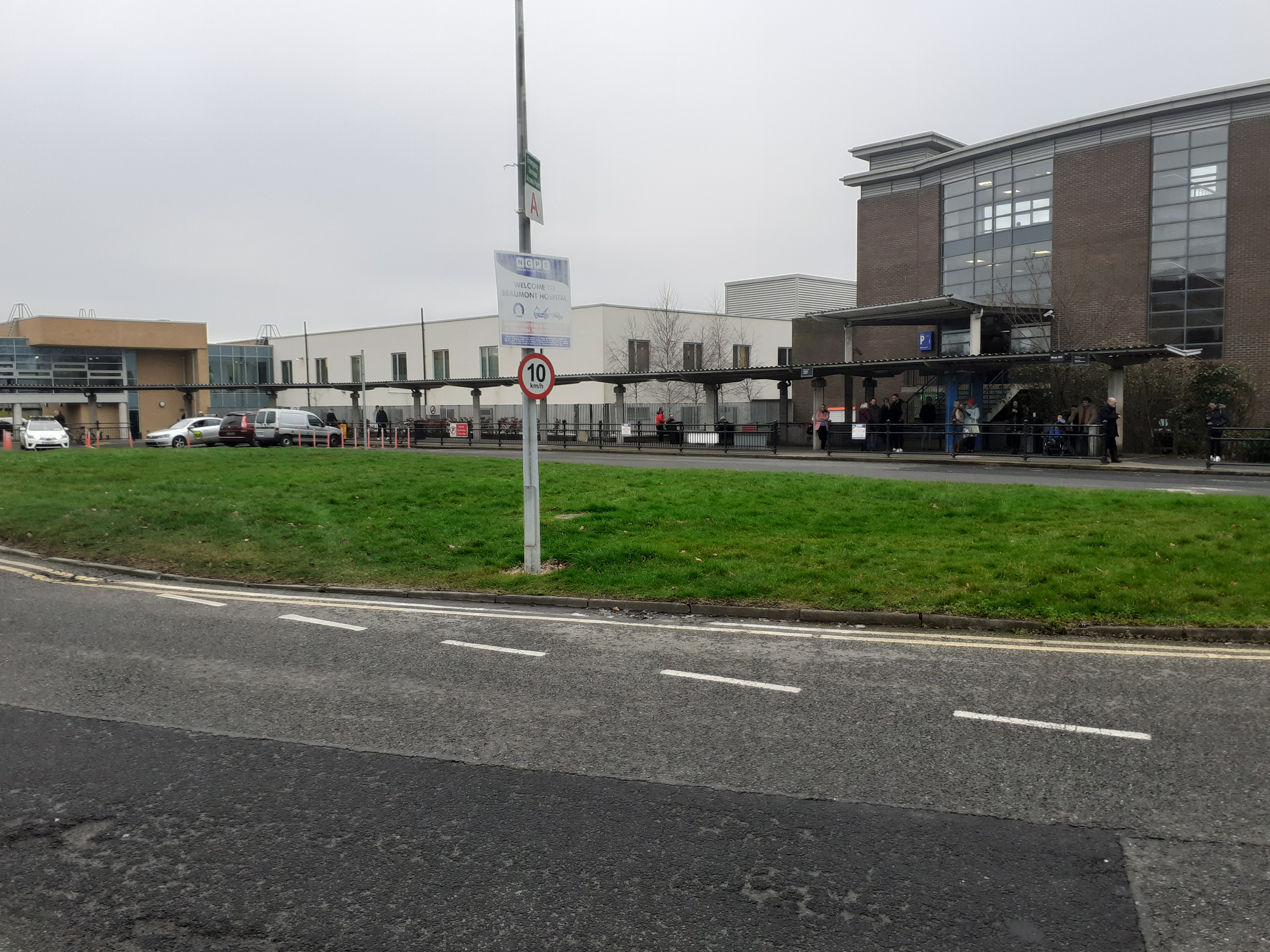
- Beaumont Hospital in Dublin, Ireland

- Location in Ireland
- Coordinates: 53°23′05″N 6°13′22″W
- Country: Ireland
- Province: Leinster
- County: County Dublin
- Local government area: Dublin City Council

Government
  - Dáil Éireann: Dublin Bay North
  - EU Parliament: Dublin
- Time zone: UTC+0 (WET)
  - Summer (DST): UTC-1 (IST (WEST))
- Eircode routing key: D05, D09
- Area code: 01, +353 1
- Irish Grid Reference: O176375

Beaumont (Irish: Beaumont) is a suburb of Dublin, Ireland, bordered by Donnycarney, Santry, Coolock and Artane. It lies within the postal districts of Dublin 5 and Dublin 9.

== Etymology ==
The name is derived from the French for "beautiful mount" as the parish is located atop an ascent from Fairview and is inspired by its clean air and views across Dublin to the Wicklow Mountains. The name was apparently given by Olivia Whitemore and Arthur Guinness in 1764, as they made their new family home in Beaumont House, now a protected structure.

== History ==
Beaumont was originally a farm in the Civil Parish of Coolock, between the townlands of Kilmore Big and Kilmore Little. It is the former home of the Guinness family from 1764 to 1855. The original 1764 lease between Charles Gardiner and Arthur Guinness can still be seen in the National Library of Ireland. Guinness took 51 acres (210,000 m^{2}) "more or less situate in the Parish of Coolock" on a lease for the longer of 31 years or three lives, and built a house "at Kilmore"; it is apparent that he later named the property "Beaumont". His rent was £93 p.a.

In 1900 Beaumont House residence was bought by The Sisters of Mercy who opened a convalescent home there to provide aftercare for patients from the Mater Hospital.

RTÉ had a radio transmitter in Thorndale, Beaumont (off Beaumont Road, where Collinswood estate is now), from which from 1982 broadcast RTÉ Radio 2 on 1278 kHz AM to the Dublin region, it ceased broadcasting on 15 December 2003. RTÉ used the Beaumont facility to jam radio signals from pirate radio stations in the 1980s.

== Notable places ==
Beaumont is the location of one of Dublin's main hospitals, Beaumont Hospital, and the Sister of Mercy Convalescent Home. Other facilities include a small group of shops and two pubs.

A former home of Arthur Guinness, which he built in 1764 and named Beaumont House from which the area got its name, is also called Guinness House, is now a convalescent home for the elderly, run by the Sisters of Mercy in recent years it has been bought by the HSE; there was an ice house on its lands.

Beaumont is mainly a residential area consisting of large housing estates, the first large development in the area being Elm Mount Estate (1960s), Beaumont Woods - a recent development which houses Beaumont Medical Centre and is located next to Beaumont Hospital - Collinswood and Ardmore and Montrose.

Catherine McAuley Park is a small park in the Beaumont Woods estate dedicated to the Sisters of Mercy founder.

== Amenities and Clubs ==
The Artane and Beaumont Family Recreation Centre is a community centre at the junction of Skelly's Lane, and Kilmore Road, it is used for a variety of social activities, music societies, childcare, afterschool homework club as well as sporting activities such as Basketball, Volleyball and Badminton. Rockfield Park is a park located in Beaumont. It was built to serve the 3 neighbouring estates of Elm Mount, Whitethorn and Thorndale, all of which were built around the perimeter of Rockfield. It is home to Rockfield Park Tennis Club and Artane Beaumont Football Club. Founded in 1978 in St. Fiacra's School, the 140th Scouts Beaumont, a member of Scouting Ireland is based in Montrose Park. Celtic Park F.C. is based in Beaumont and plays games in Beaumont Woods (Mercy College, Beaumont), St. Kevin's Boys Club, plays some matches in Coolgrena, Beaumont. Beaumont Tak Kwon do centre is based in Our Lady of Mercy College, Beaumont. Elm Mount F.C., based in Beaumont, plays its games in ALSAA, and at the Ierne Sports Club in Drumcondra. Beaumont Bridge Club, use the Donnycarney/Beaumont Care Centre, St. John's Court, off the Malahide Road.

== Religion ==
Beaumont is a parish in the Fingal South East deanery of the Roman Catholic Archdiocese of Dublin, and has a parish church, the Nativity of the Lord Church. It was constituted a Parish from Doneycarney in 1977. There is also a Catholic parish in Whitehall, also taking in the townlands of Santry, Larkhill and to a lesser extent Artane West and Artane South, and part of Artane North. It is served by the Church of the Holy Child on the old airport road. This church was blessed by Pope John Paul II as his motorcade passed by during his visit to Ireland in 1979. Beaumont Parish, St. Luke the Evangelist (Kilmore), and Holy Child (Whitehall) form a cluster of parishes. Beaumont Parish Centre is used by a number of organisations. The nearest Church of Ireland churches are Coolock or St. Pappan's in Santry.

== Schools ==
An all-girls school, Our Lady of Mercy College, Beaumont, founded in 1957 by the Sisters of Mercy on part of their land of the Beaumont estate, is located beside the hospital. St. Fiachra's Junior and Senior Schools (established in 1978) are also located near the hospital and the church, and St. Pauls Special School is also here. Boys secondary schools that serve the area are St. Davids CBS in Artane, and St. Aidans CBS in Whitehall.

== Notable people ==
- Orla de Brí (born 1965), is a contemporary Irish sculptor
- Arthur Guinness, brewer, established his residence in Beaumont, in what is now Beaumont convalescent home
- Gavin Kilkenny, Bournemouth footballer
- Paddy Mulligan, former Chelsea and Republic of Ireland international footballer, was born and raised in Beaumont
- Robert Watt, civil servant, grew up in Beaumont
