= Robert Watt (Irish civil servant) =

Irish civil servant

Robert Watt is the Chief Executive Officer of the Dublin City Development Company. He is a former civil servant and economist. He was the Secretary General of the Department of Health from 2021 to 2026.

== Background ==
Watt was born in 1969 or 1970. He grew up in Beaumont, Dublin and went to school at Ardscoil Rís. He holds a degree in business studies from the College of Commerce, Rathmines, and a master's degree in economics from University College Dublin (UCD).

== Career ==
After graduating from UCD, Watt worked briefly at IDA Ireland before joining the Department of Finance in 1993. In 2000, he resigned from the civil service to work as an economist in the private sector with roles at London Economics and Indecon Economic Consultants. Watt returned to the civil service in 2008, when he was made Assistant Secretary General at the Department of Finance. In 2011, he was appointed by Brendan Howlin as the first Secretary General of the Department of Public Expenditure and Reform. He held this post until he became Secretary General of the Department of Health in 2021. He left the Department of Health in April 2026.

Watt previously applied for the role of Governor of the Central Bank of Ireland but was unsuccessful. He was also considered for the post of Garda Commissioner in 2017, a job which ultimately went to Drew Harris. Watt is a former member of the board of the National Treasury Management Agency and a former member of the Economic Management Council. His "combative" and "arrogant" style has been widely reported as the cause of disagreements with colleagues, including rows with several Government Ministers, and his salary of €292,000 has caused national controversy.

== Personal life ==
Watt lives in Marino, Dublin and has 2 children. Watt is a soccer enthusiast. He has volunteered as a youth team coach at Drumcondra F.C. and is a director of the Football Association of Ireland.
