= Orla de Brí =

Irish sculptor

- Born: 1965 (age 60–61); Dublin
- Notable work: Belvelly Castle, Co Cork displays a 3-meter figure and a 5-meter 24ct gold leafed tree on the roof

Orla de Brí (born 1965), is a contemporary Irish sculptor.

== Biography ==
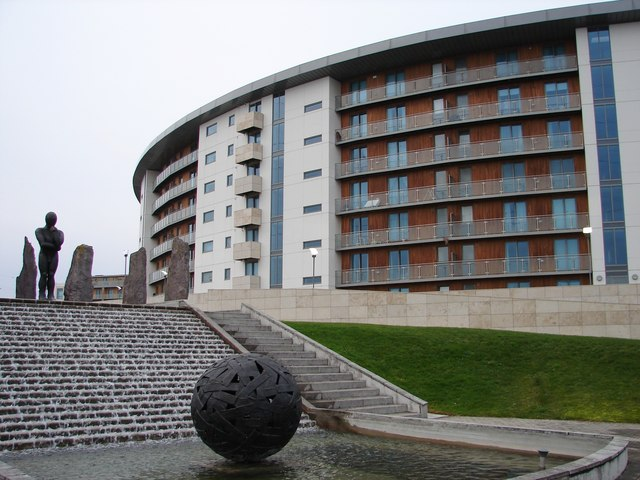
The Bastard Son of Sisyphus - Park West Business Park

Orla de Brí was from Beaumont in Dublin, born in 1965. She attended the Grafton Academy and studied fashion. After that she went on to work designing items for various high-street brands like A Wear. She married a systems analyst and they moved to Kilmoon, County Meath where they had two children while she continued studying art. She studied sculpture and bronze casting with a teacher in the North Strand VEC and the National College of Art and Design. De Brí began her first pieces and within ten years had won a major commission for the Park West Business Park. De Brí has since had a number of solo shows and commissions around the world. Her art is in collections all over Ireland as well as abroad.
