= Twelve Responses to Tragedy =

Memorial in London to victims of Communism

Coordinates: 51°29′44.35″N 0°10′20.62″W

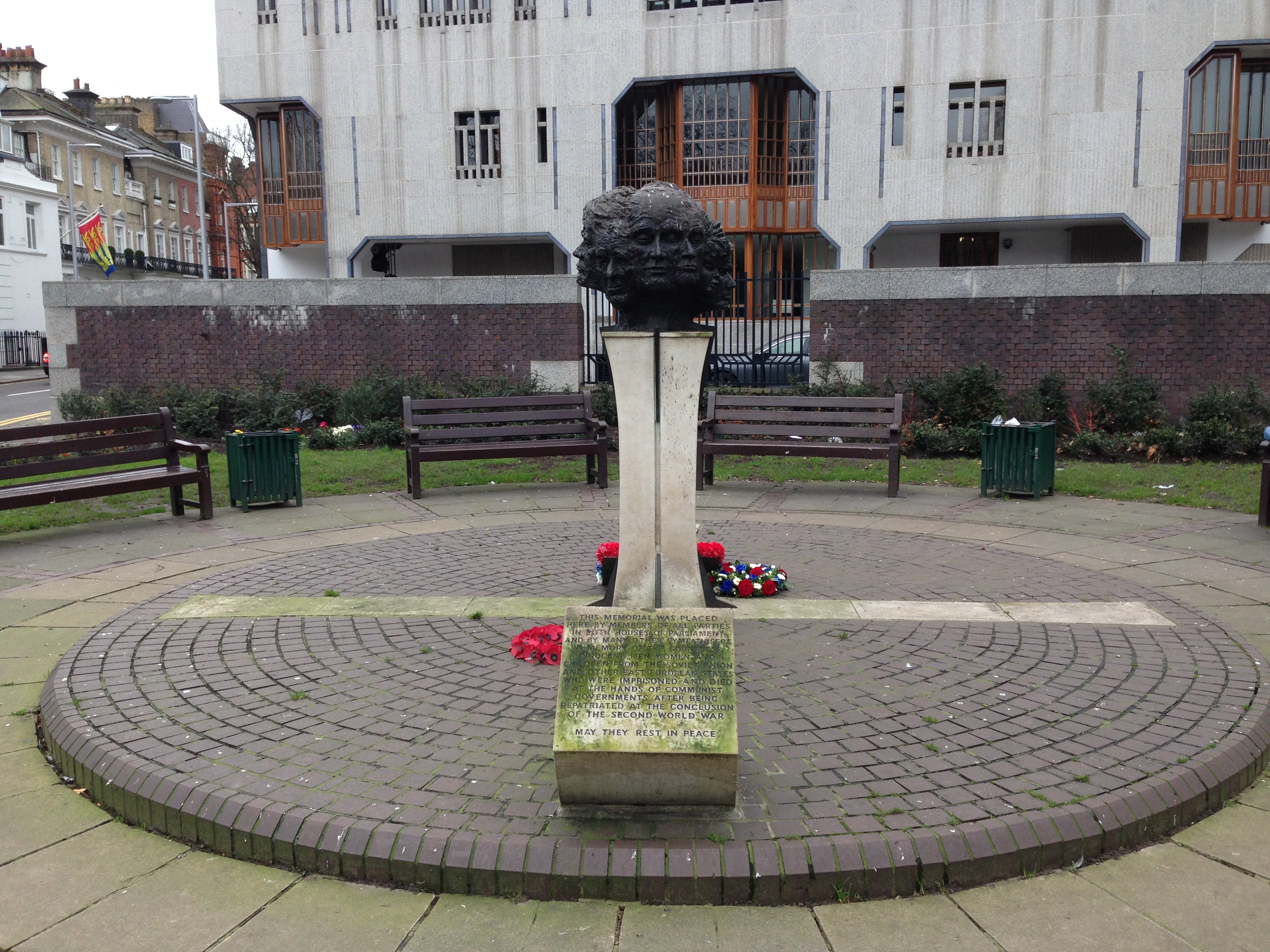
- The memorial in January 2016
- Artist: Angela Conner
- Year: 1986
- Type: Sculpture
- Medium: Bronze
- Location: London, United Kingdom

Twelve Responses to Tragedy, or the Yalta Memorial, is a memorial located in the Yalta Memorial Garden on Cromwell Road in South Kensington in west London. The memorial commemorates people displaced as a result of the Allied repatriation of Soviet citizens after World War II, mandated by the Yalta Conference. Created by the British sculptor Angela Conner, the work consists of twelve bronze busts atop a stone base. The memorial was dedicated in 1986 to replace a previous memorial (also by Conner) from 1982 that had been repeatedly damaged by vandalism.

== Location ==
The memorial is located in the Yalta Memorial Garden at the junction of Cromwell Gardens, Thurloe Place and Thurloe Square, adjacent to the Victoria & Albert Museum to the north. The garden and memorial are publicly accessible at all times.

== History ==
Plans for a memorial were initiated after a letter was written to The Spectator in the 1970s signed by Richard West, Patrick Marnham and Auberon Waugh who proposed that a memorial be erected to the "... memory of the hundreds of thousands of innocent people who were forcibly repatriated by the Allies to the Soviet and Yugoslav authorities at the end of the Second World War, a crime that was carefully hushed up at the time and even concealed from Parliament for fear of the outcry that would have resulted". A later letter to The Times calling for a memorial was signed by politicians Bernard Braine, Jo Grimond, Donald J. Stewart, John Mackintosh, James Molyneaux, Gwynfor Evans, Nicholas Bethell, John Foster, Christopher Mayhew, and Harmar Nicholls, and writers Rebecca West, Hugh Trevor-Roper, Nicolas Cheetham, Nikolai Tolstoy and John Jolliffe.

Braine and Jolliffe later appealed for funds in a letter to The Times in 1978. The cost was of the memorial was estimated at £11,000 in their letter.

The memorial was approved by Prime Minister Margaret Thatcher in May 1980, over the objections of the Foreign Office who opposed the erection on land that belonged to the Crown Estate of a monument that implicitly criticised the past actions of the British government.

A memorial fountain with stone benches sculpted by Angela Conner was built and dedicated by the Bishop of London, Graham Leonard, on 6 March 1982. The creation of the memorial was opposed by both the government of the Soviet Union and the Foreign Office.

The memorial was repeatedly vandalised and was irreparably damaged after being cut in two by an electric stone-cutting saw in the autumn of 1982. An appeal for a second monument was launched and Conner sold lithographs for £50 each depicting scenes of brutality against refugees to help raise funds. Conner's second memorial for Yalta, Twelve Responses to Tragedy, was dedicated in the same place as the previous memorial on 2 August 1986 by the Bishop of Fulham, John Klyberg. Reviewing Conner's recent work in The Times in October 1986, critic John Russell Taylor wrote that the memorial "hardly rise[s] above the level of kitsch". In 2013 the memorial was described as being in a poor condition.

== Description ==
The original memorial showed a sphere kept in perpetual motion by jets of water. The present memorial consists of a stone column upon a brick plinth; upon the column sits a bronze bust of 12 conjoined heads of men, women, and children.

On the south side of the memorial at ground level inscription on stone reads:

THIS SCULPTURE/ WAS DEDICATED BY/ THE BISHOP OF FULHAM/ ON 2ND AUGUST 1986 TO/ REPLACE THE PREVIOUS/ MEMORIAL DEDICATED BY/ THE BISHOP OF LONDON/ ON 6TH MARCH 1982 WHICH/ WAS LATER DESTROYED BY/ VANDALS TO WHOM THE/ TRUTH WAS INTOLERABLE

An inscription on a curved stone plinth on the east side of the memorial reads:

THIS MEMORIAL WAS PLACED/ HERE BY MEMBERS OF ALL PARTIES/ IN BOTH HOUSES OF PARLIAMENT/ AND BY MANY OTHER SYMPATHISERS/ IN MEMORY OF THE COUNTLESS/ INNOCENT MEN WOMEN AND/ CHILDREN FROM THE SOVIET UNION/ AND OTHER EAST EUROPEAN STATES/ WHO WERE IMPRISONED AND DIED AT THE HANDS OF COMMUNIST/ GOVERNMENTS AFTER BEING/ REPATRIATED AT THE CONCLUSION OF THE SECOND WORLD WAR/ MAY THEY REST IN PEACE

The inscription on the memorial was personally approved by Margaret Thatcher during her tenure as prime minister. The memorial has been described as a war memorial as it was created in response to events that arose out of the conclusion of the Second World War.

== Gallery ==
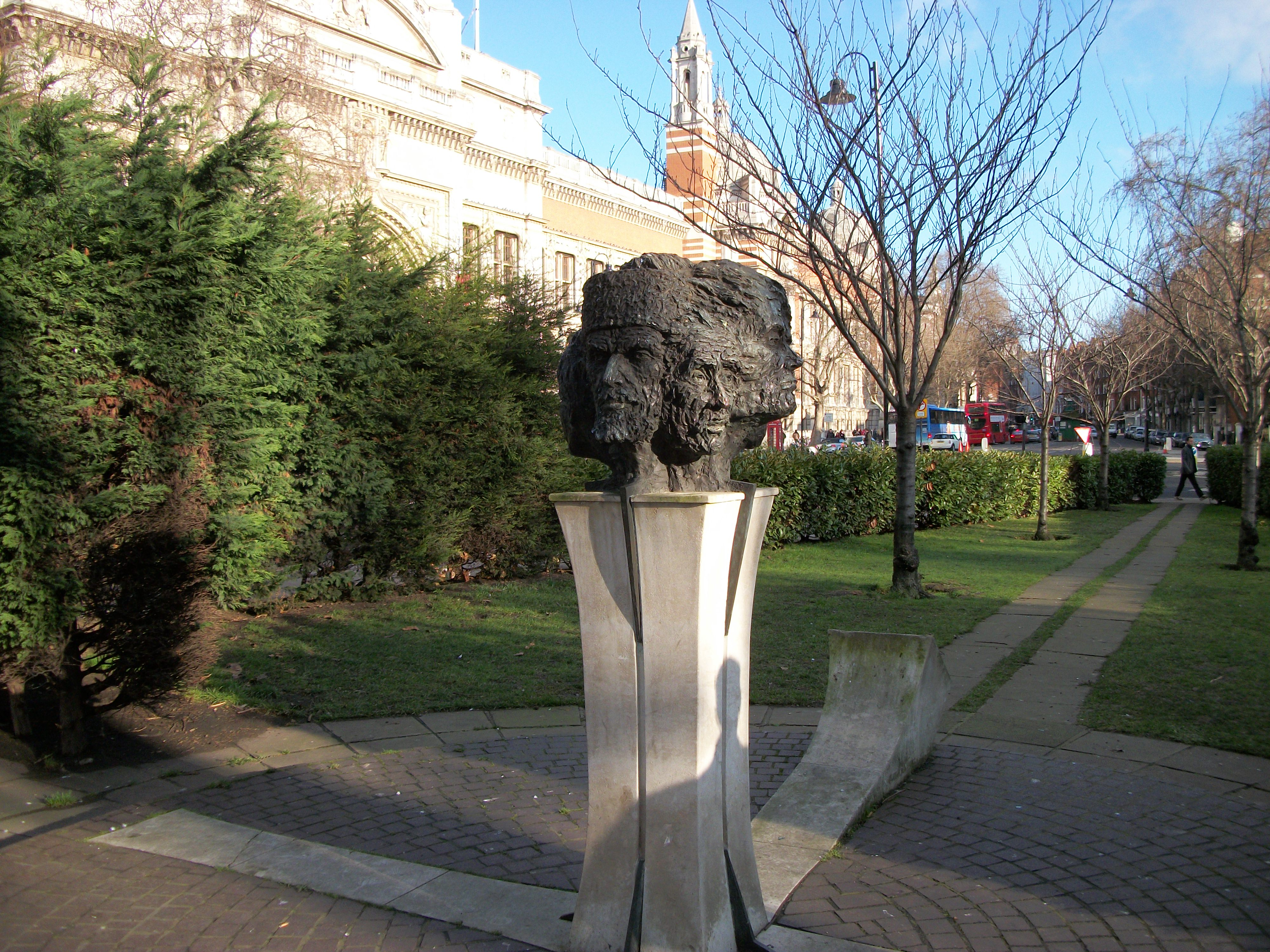

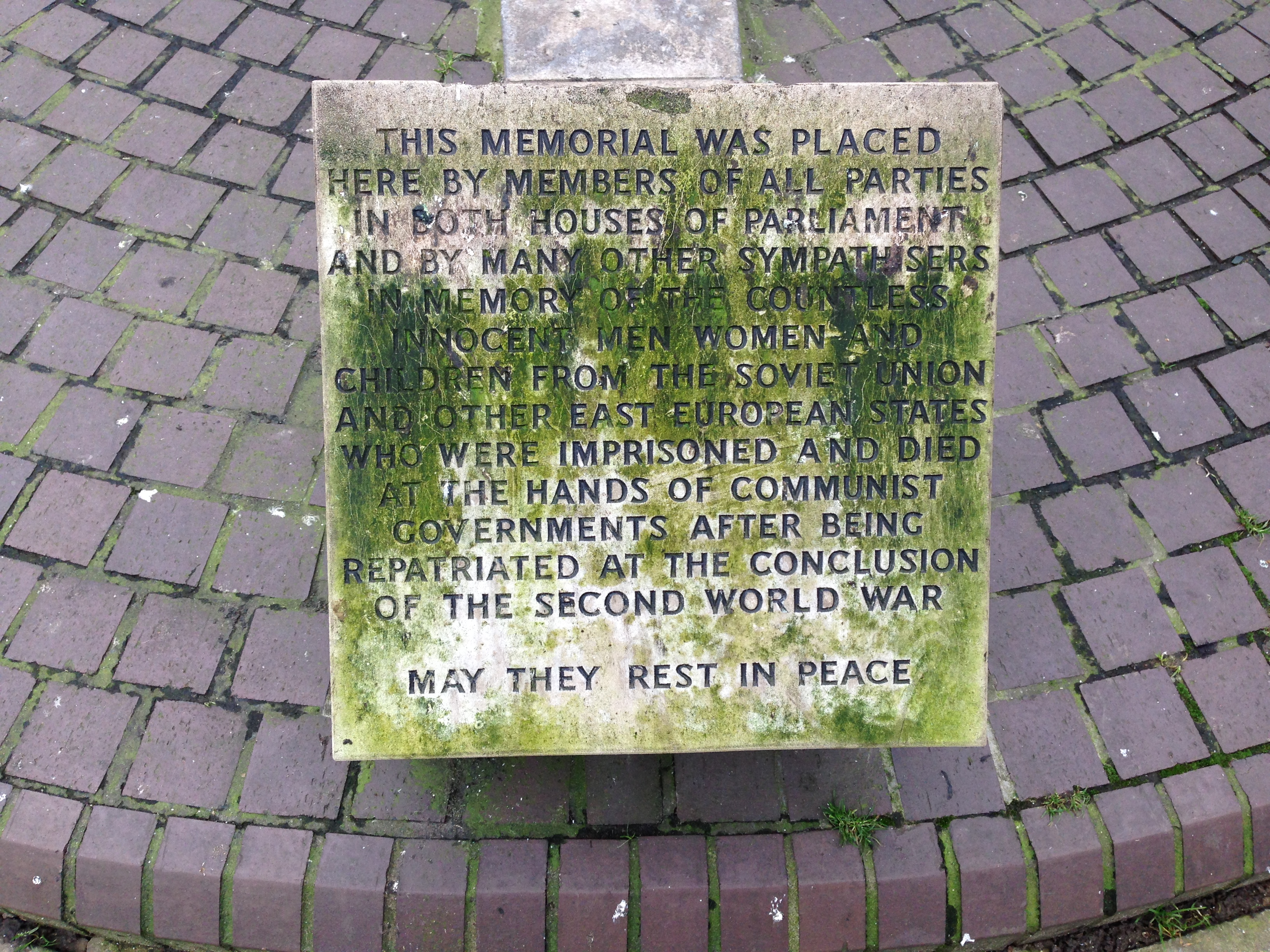

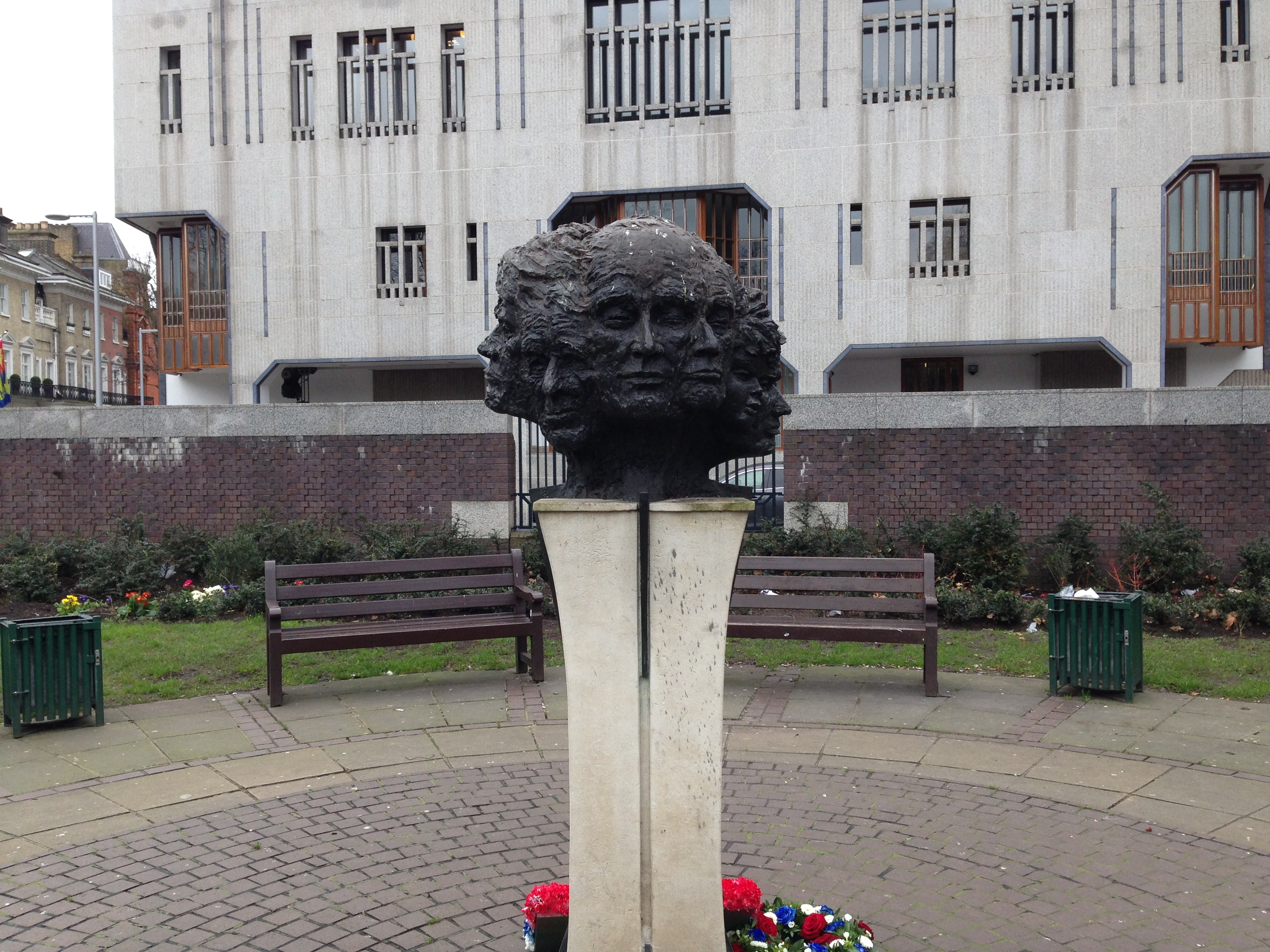

== See also ==
- Bleiburg repatriations
- Repatriation of Soviet citizens after World War II
  - Operation Keelhaul
  - Repatriation of Cossacks after World War II
- Soviet repressions against former prisoners of war
- Swedish extradition of Baltic soldiers
- Western betrayal
