= Stephen Bouquet =

English convicted cat killer (1967–2022)

- Born: Stephen Rodney Bouquet; 5 January 1967; London, England
- Died: 5 January 2022 (aged 55); Medway Maritime Hospital, Gillingham, Kent, England
- Other names: Brighton Cat Killer; Cat Slasher
- Occupation: Security guard
- Known for: Killing domesticated cats
- Motive: Ailurophobia
- Criminal charges: criminal damage; possession of a knife in a public place; failing to answer bail.
- Penalty: Five years and three months' imprisonment with Her Majesty's Prison Service.

Details
- Victims: Sixteen domesticated cats.
- Locations: Brighton, East Sussex, England

Stephen Rodney Bouquet (5 January 1967 – 5 January 2022), also known as the Brighton Cat Killer, was a British criminal who was sentenced to five years and three months in prison for killing nine cats, maiming seven more, possession of a knife in a public place and failing to answer bail. These attacks occurred in Brighton, East Sussex, England from October 2018 to June 2019. On 5 January 2022, Bouquet died of COVID-19, while serving his sentence in HM Prison Elmley.

== Background ==
During the time period of the incidents, Bouquet was employed as a security guard at a shopping centre in Brighton. Bouquet was a military veteran, having served for twenty-two years achieving the rank of warrant officer in the Royal Navy and was stationed in Northern Ireland and Iraq.

== Hendrix attack ==
Mr. Levy, owner of a previously killed cat, had set-up a closed-circuit television (CCTV) system in Crown Gardens, a narrow alley connecting Church Street and North Road in Brighton, to monitor the area. On 31 May 2019, the CCTV system captured Stephen Bouquet bending over to stroke a nine-month old kitten named Hendrix, then removing a knife from his rucksack and stabbing Hendrix, who fled to his owner's home. Stewart Montgomery the owner of Hendrix found him bleeding profusely and transported him to a veterinarian, but Hendrix died from the inflicted knife wounds. The Sussex Police advised that the CCTV video was the evidence required to identify Bouquet as the Brighton Cat Killer.

== Arrest and criminal charges ==
On 2 June 2019, just two days after the Hendrix incident, Mr. Levy visually witnessed on his live CCTV, Bouquet in the area again and contacted the Sussex Police. Bouquet was promptly arrested carrying a Leatherman multi-tool.

During police questioning recorded on video, Brighton denied harming any cats stating that "I'm no threat to animals [...] "I have no issues with cats, dogs or anything like that".

The Sussex Police obtained a search warrant for Bouquet's personal on Rose Hill Terrace and for his smartphone. The phone contained several images of the cats he had attacked, both alive and deceased. In addition, Sussex Police analyzed Bouquet’s computer data in which they discovered a history of explicit videos showing dogs killing cats. The smartphone data placed Bouquet at or near the scene of the cat attacks at virtually the same time. In Bouquet's kitchen a knife was obtained with the residue of cat's blood on the blade and Bouquet's DNA on the handle.

The Sussex Police were able to obtain enough evidence to charge Bouquet with killing the nine cats by stabbing them with a knife; the deceased cats were named: Nancy, Ollie, Alan, Tommy, Cosmo, Hendrix, Hannah, Kyo and Gizmo. In addition, Bouquet injured another seven cats with knife stab wounds named: Wheatley, Alistair, Rigby, Gideon, Samson, Jasper and Maggie. These sixteen incidents occurred in Brighton, East Sussex, between October 2018 and June 2019.

Authorities believe that Bouquet may have been responsible for over forty cat attacks in Brighton.

The Sussex Police laid sixteen charges of criminal damage as the legislation under English law deems cats to be property. In addition, one charge of possession of a knife in a public place was laid.

Charges laid against Stephen Bouquet
Date	Location	Cat's name	Owner	Valuation	Charge
12–13 February 2018	Rugby Road	Jasper	David Perry	£2,140	Criminal damage to property; without lawful excuse, damaged a cat belonging to David Perry.
2 October 2018	Crown Gardens	Wheatley	Andrea Williams	Unknown	Criminal damage to property; without lawful excuse, damaged a cat belonging to Andrea Williams.
11 October 2018	Crown Gardens	Hannah	Marianna Penturo	£150	Criminal damage to property; without lawful excuse, destroyed a cat belonging to Marianna Penturo.
14 October 2018	Trafalgar Terrace	Alistair	Stewart Cruse	£2,421	Criminal damage to property; without lawful excuse, damaged a cat belonging to Stewart Cruse.
31 October 2018	Stafford Road	Rigby	Penny Vessey	£915	Criminal damage to property; without lawful excuse, damaged a cat belonging to Penny Vessey.
5 November 2018	Trafalgar Terrace	Gideon	Tina Randall	£1,623	Criminal damage to property; without lawful excuse, damaged a cat belonging to Tina Randall.
18 November 2018	Ditchling Rise	Samson	Seanin Mouland	£7,500	Criminal damage to property; without lawful excuse, damaged a cat belonging to Seanin Mouland.
4 February 2019	North Gardens	Alan	Katherine Mattock	£135	Criminal damage to property; without lawful excuse, destroyed a cat belonging to Katherine Mattock.
18 March 2019	Shaftesbury Road	Nancy	Jeff Carter	£3,214	Criminal damage to property; without lawful excuse, destroyed a cat belonging to Jeff Carter.
27 March 2019	Ditchling Rise	Gizmo	Emma O’Sullivan	£384	Criminal damage to property; without lawful excuse, destroyed a cat belonging to Emma O’Sullivan.
2 May 2019	Rugby Road	Kyo	Paul Tofts	Unknown	Criminal damage to property; without lawful excuse, destroyed a cat belonging to Paul Tofts.
5 May 2019	Rugby Road	Ollie	Sarah McKenzie	£384	Criminal damage to property; without lawful excuse, destroyed a cat belonging to Sarah McKenzie.
31 May 2019	Crown Gardens	Hendrix	Stewart Montgomery	£1,663	Criminal damage to property; without lawful excuse, destroyed a cat belonging to Stewart Montgomery.
1 June 2019	Port Hall Place	Cosmo	Lucy Kenward	£5,056	Criminal damage to property; without lawful excuse, destroyed a cat belonging to Lucy Kenward.
1 June 2019	Coventry Street	Maggie	Claire Smith	£4,862	Criminal damage to property; without lawful excuse, damaged a cat belonging to Claire Smith.

== Failing to answer bail ==
Bouquet failed to answer bail. The Sussex Police eventually located and apprehended Bouquet based on a tip from a member of the public that observed him drinking alcohol and displaying odd behaviour at a park in Brighton.

== Trial ==
On 22 June 2021, at the Chichester Crown Court the criminal trial by jury with Judge Jeremy Gold QC presiding was held. Bouquet failed to appear for the court hearing and was tried in absentia. Jurors at the trial heard numerous shocked owners found their cats bleeding and dying on their doorsteps.

"In 2018 Sussex Police commenced what became a major investigation following reports of domestic cats being targeted and deliberately stabbed in Brighton. Sometimes owners … found that their cats were still alive and were able to take timely action to try and save them by rushing them to their vets."

— Crown Prosecutor Rowan Jenkins, told jurors.

Bouquet was convicted of all sixteen counts of criminal damage and possession of a knife in a public place.

== Sentencing ==
On 12 July 2021, judge Jeremy Gold, Queens Counsel, presided over the sentencing hearing at Hove Crown Court.

Bouquet's lawyer advised the Court that Bouquet had served in the Royal Navy for twenty-two years and might suffer from post-traumatic stress disorder (PTSD). In addition, the Court was advised that Bouquet had been medically diagnosed with thyroid cancer, which had spread to his liver and lungs.

Judge Gold stated that Bouquet's behaviour was "cruel, it was sustained and it struck at the very heart of family life. It is important that everyone understands that cats are domestic pets but they are more than that. They are effectively family members. They are much loved by the adults and children who live with and care for them. Cats and all domestic animals are a source of joy and support to their owners, especially during [COVID-19] lockdown."

Judge Gold sentenced Bouquet to five years for criminal damage, i.e., the cat killings, three months for possession of a knife in a public place, to be served concurrently, and three months for failing to answer bail, to be served consecutively— with an aggregate prison sentence to be served of five-years and three-months. Judge Gold stated that Bouquet's criminal actions were "appalling", that the impact on the owners and their families was "considerable and grave", and that "no explanation for [Bouquet's] behaviour has been put forward, but [then again] no sensible explanation could be advanced".

"This has been a tragic case for all the owners involved. Not only did Steve Bouquet inflict horrendous suffering to each of the animals he attacked, but he also caused real trauma to their owners, many of whom found their beloved pets injured and bleeding. None of us can comprehend what drove Bouquet to do this to family pets. His claims that it was simply chance that he was present at various times when the animals were attacked were rightly dismissed by the jury after being disproved by the investigation and prosecution work."

— Senior Crown Prosecutor Jayne Cioffi, for the Crown Prosecution Service

== Death ==
While Bouquet was serving his sentence at the HM Prison Elmley he was receiving end-of-life care for thyroid cancer, when he experienced symptoms of coughing and breathing difficulties. Bouquet was transferred from prison and admitted to the Medway Maritime Hospital where he tested positive for COVID-19 on 28 December 2021. Despite receiving medical care, including antibiotics and oxygen, his condition worsened.

At an inquest in Maidstone, Kent, Coroner Patricia Harding stated that Bouquet died on 5 January 2022, of natural causes from COVID-19 pneumonitis and a secondary cause of chronic obstructive pulmonary disease (COPD). The coroner advised that Bouquet had been extremely frail, experienced poor mobility and was vulnerable to infection. The coroner concluded that the officials at HM Prison Elmley followed national guidelines to prevent the spread of the virus. The coroner expressed condolences to Bouquet’s brother and apologised for the length of time it took to reach a conclusion due to the ongoing impact of the COVID-19 pandemic.

== Documentary ==
On 8 June 2022, the first broadcast of the ITV documentary "How to Catch a Cat Killer" was broadcast. A spokesperson for Sussex Police stated that "An ITV documentary highlighting the successful Sussex Police investigation into the death of nine cats in Brighton will be aired this week. The ITV documentary will follow the complex and thorough investigation from the first reports being received in late 2018 through to sentencing in September 2021. It will show the breakthrough moment in May 2019 when CCTV captured Bouquet stabbing nine-month-old Hendrix in a passageway in Brighton, and his subsequent police interviews following arrest."

After the ITV documentary was aired, some viewers felt upset and disturbed, believing the documentary should not have been broadcast.

== See also ==
- Ailurophobia, excessive fear or hate of cats.
- Aleeta Raugust, serial cat killer.
- Croydon Cat Killer
- Human interaction with cats
