= List of public art in West Sussex =

Artworks on public display in West Sussex, England

This is an incomplete list of public art in West Sussex, a county in south-eastern England. For the purposes of this list, public art is defined as open-air sculpture and other monuments or artwork. In general, indoor sculpture and artwork on buildings is not included.

== Amberley ==
Image	Work	Location	Date	Sculptor/Artist	Source	Coordinates
	Tomb of Edward Stott	St Michael's Churchyard	1918	Francis Derwent Wood		
	Tomb of Francis Derwent Wood	St Michael's Churchyard	1926	Francis Derwent Wood, Sir Edwin Lutyens		

== Bognor Regis ==
Image	Work	Location	Date	Sculptor/Artist	Source	Coordinates
	Sun Sculpture	High Street	19 March 2008	Pete Codling		50°47′02″N 0°40′24″W

== Burgess Hill ==
Image	Work	Location	Date	Sculptor/Artist	Source	Coordinates
	Stone Garden	Church Walk, opposite St John's Church	1996	Jane Sybilla Fordham and David Parfitt		50°57′24″N 0°07′57″W
	Figure of Stability	St John's Park	1972	Sean Crampton		

== Chichester ==
Image	Work	Location	Date	Sculptor/Artist	Source	Coordinates
	Spartacus	Chichester Festival Theatre	1988	Tom Merrifield		
	Oedipus	Minerva Theatre	1984	Trude Bunzl		
	Minerva	Minerva Theatre	1997	Philip Jackson		50°50′33″N 0°46′39″W
	St Richard	Chichester Cathedral	15 June 2000	Philip Jackson		50°50′11″N 0°46′53″W
	Axis Mundi	University of Chichester chapel	6 October 1990	John Skelton		
	Murray Relief	University of Chichester	1993	Peter Hodgkinson		
	The Symbol of Discovery	The Novium	1963	John Skelton (sculptor), Stanley Roth (architect)		
	Helping Hand of Justice	Courtyard at Chichester Crown Court	1973	John Skelton		
	Chichester Market Cross	Market Place	15th century	Unknown		50°50′11″N 0°46′45″W
	Bride of the Konsul	Courtyard of Pallant House Gallery	1962	Eduardo Paolozzi		
	Artificial Sun	Courtyard of Pallant House Gallery	1964	Eduardo Paolozzi		
	One Criterion	St Richard's Hospital	1996	Vincent Gray		
	The Seashore	St Richard's Hospital	Unknown	Libby Tribe		
	Pope Joan	St Richard's Hospital	1999	Philip Jackson		
	Sea Change	St Richard's Hospital	1996	George Cutts		
	Fluke	St Richard's Hospital	1997	Walter Bailey		

== Cocking ==
Image	Work	Location	Date	Sculptor/Artist	Source	Coordinates
	Cocking History Column	Coking Hill	15 April 2005	Cocking History Group with Juliet Crawford and Philip Jackson		50°57′01″N 0°45′12″W

== Crawley ==
Image	Work	Location	Date	Sculptor/Artist	Source	Coordinates
	Flying Spiral	Hawth Avenue	2001	Ray Smith (artist)		
	Gateway to High Street	High Street	11 December 1999	Kate Maddison		
	The Golden Tree	High Street/Ifield Road	2006	Joss Smith		51°06′52″N 0°11′25″W
	Martlets Tree	Queens Square	October 1999	Peter Parkinson and Richard Quinnell		
	Lion	Tilgate Park	2000	Christian Funnell		
	Conduit and Continuum	Tilgate Park	2001	Will Glanfield		
	The Boy and the Sturgeon	Tilgate Park (Note: Previously located in Queen's Square. In storage while the area was redeveloped, before being moved to Tilgate Park in 2025.)	1950s			

== Goodwood Estate ==
Image	Work	Location	Date	Sculptor/Artist	Source	Coordinates
	Statue of Douglas Bader	Goodwood Circuit, near the Aero Club	9 August 2001	Kenneth Potts		
	Statue of Mike Hawthorn and Lofty England	September 2005	Goodwood Circuit, pit area	David Annand		
	Horse	29 July 1980	Goodwood Racecourse			
	Gate	2001	Goodwood Estate	Wendy Ramshaw, Cass Sculpture Foundation		50°52′46″N 0°43′17″W

== Haywards Heath ==
Image	Work	Location	Date	Sculptor/Artist	Source	Coordinates
	A Family Outing	The Orchards shopping centre	1985	John Ravera		50°59′49″N 0°06′11″W

== Horsham ==
Image	Work	Location	Date	Sculptor/Artist	Source	Coordinates
	Horsham Heritage Sundial	The Forum	24 October 2003	Edwin Russell, Lorne McKean		
	Pirie's Donkey and Cart	Pirie's Place shopping centre	1993	Lorne McKean		
	St Leonard's Forest Dragon	Horsham Park	2000	Hannah Holmes Stewart		
	Sungod	Horsham Park	1991	John Skelton		

== Littlehampton ==
Image	Work	Location	Date	Sculptor/Artist	Source	Coordinates
	Oyster waymarkers	Pier Road/Arun Parade	11 July 2007	Brian Fell, Gordon Young, with local secondary school students		
	River Circle	Surrey Street	2004			50°48′31″N 0°32′42″W

== Selsey ==
Image	Work	Location	Date	Sculptor/Artist	Source	Coordinates
	Kanagawa/The Wave	B2145 Chichester Road, north of town	2000 (installed in current location 2007)	William Pye		50°44′32″N 0°46′56″W

== Shoreham-by-Sea ==
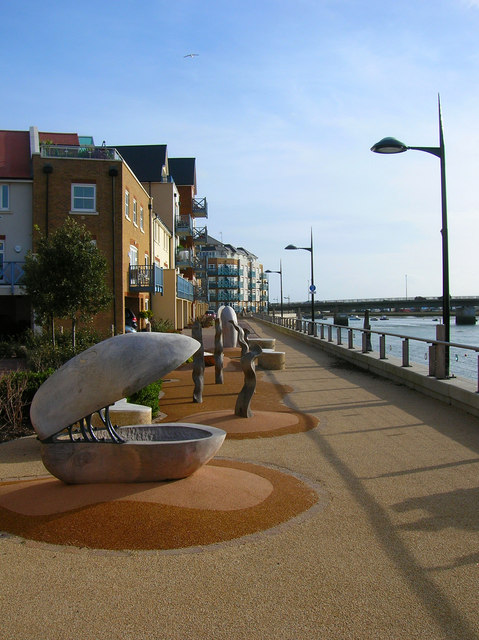
Some of the Ropetackle sculptures

A series of sculptures was installed as part of the redevelopment of the Ropetackle area. They are sited outside the Ropetackle Arts Centre and along the River Adur between 1999 and 2006. The lead artist was Steve Geliot, who oversaw several other artists in creating works for the scheme.

Image	Work	Location	Date	Sculptor/Artist	Source	Coordinates
	Barnacle Trees	Outside Ropetakcle Arts Centre	2005	Steve Geliot		
	Lenses	Built into the balustrade on River Walk	2005	Amanada Hopkins		
	Unwinding	Riverside Walk	2005	Teresa Martin		
	Wooden sculptures	Along Riverside Walk	2005	Anna Twinam-Cauchi		
	Shoreham Airshow Crash Memorial	Riverbank by Shoreham Tollbridge	2019	Jane Sybilla Fordham, David Parfitt		

== Slindon ==
Image	Work	Location	Date	Sculptor/Artist	Source	Coordinates
	Village sign	Reynolds Lane	2000	unknown		

== Steyning ==
Image	Work	Location	Date	Sculptor/Artist	Source	Coordinates
	Statue of Saint Cuthamn	Vicarage Lane	2000	Penelope Reeve		

== Worthing ==
Image	Work	Location	Date	Sculptor/Artist	Source	Coordinates
	Desert Quartet	Montagu Shopping Centre	13 June 1990	Elisabeth Frink		50°48′39″N 0°22′18″W
	Worthing Spiral	Worthing Hospital	1997	Peter Randall-Page		
	Care and Trust	Worthing Hospital	1998	Mary Cox		
	Lie Back and Relax	Worthing Hospital	1996	Reece Ingram		
	Penguins	Worthing Hospital	2002	Ian Nutting		
	The Future – Hope and Compassion	Worthing Hospital	12 October 2000	Walter Bailey		
	Reliefs	Pavilion Theatre	c. 1960	Laurence Bradshaw		50°48′33″N 0°22′12″W
	Triton Fountain	Steyne Gardens	1968 (installed in current location 8 May 2007)	William Bloye, Benjamin Hancocks		50°48′38″N 0°22′01″W
	Sculpture in Waterwise Garden	Beach near West Parade	2006	Tom Leach		50°48′22″N 0°24′02″W

== War memorials ==
- Amberley
- Angmering
- Arundel
- Arundel RC
- Billingshurst
- Bognor Regis
- Bosham
- Burgess Hill
- Chichester
- Crawley
- Eastergate
- Fernhurst
- Ferring
- Henfield War Memorial
- Highbrook
- Horsham
- Keymer
- Linch
- Littlehampton
- Lowfield Heath
- Rogate War Memorial
- Rustington
- Selsey War Memorial
- Shoreham-by-Sea War Memorial
- Shoreham (Brighton City) Airport War Memorial
- Slindon War Memorial
- Harting War Memorial
- Southwick and Fishersgate
- Stopham
- Upper Beeding War Memorial
- Worthing War Memorial
- St Paul's, Worthing
- Worthing Boer War Memorial
