= Cromwell Gardens =

Road in South Kensington, London

Coordinates: 51°29′46″N 0°10′17″W

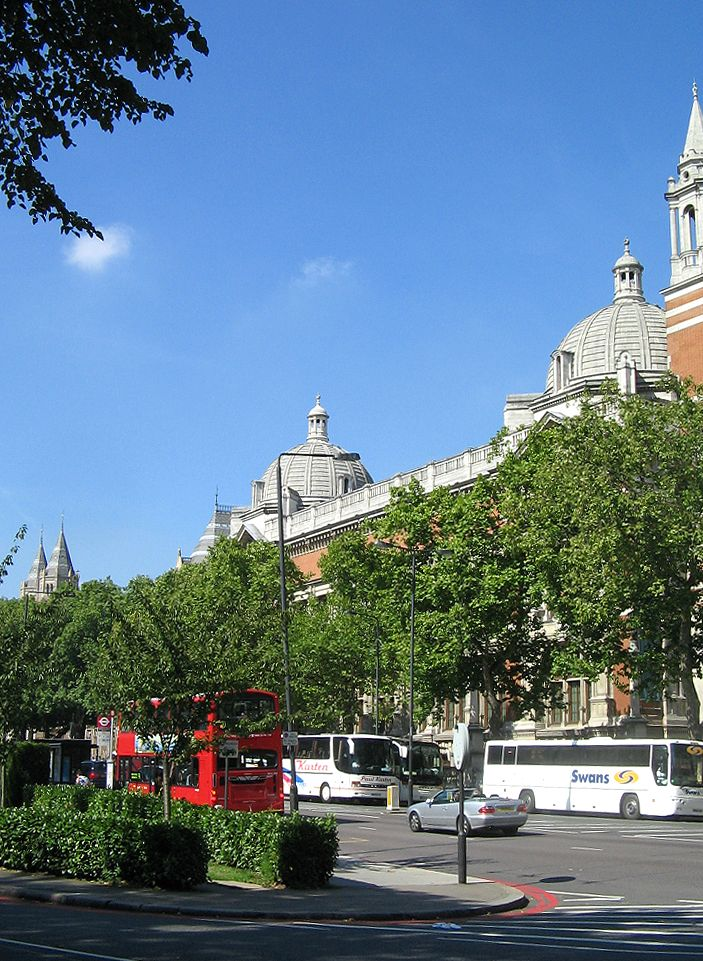
Cromwell Gardens, opposite the Victoria and Albert Museum, looking west.

Cromwell Gardens is a short but major road in South Kensington, within the Royal Borough of Kensington and Chelsea in London, England. It joins the Cromwell Road at the junction with Exhibition Road to the west with the Brompton Road to the east.

To the north, the main facade and entrance of the Victoria and Albert Museum is a dominant feature. To the south, on the corner with Exhibition Road, is the Ismaili Centre, a religious, social, and cultural meeting place for the UK Ismaili community. To the north at the junction with Brompton Road is the Brompton Oratory.

The road forms part of the major A4 trunk road into central London, and immediately to the south is the Yalta Memorial Garden, Thurloe Place and Thurloe Square.

The nearest tube station is South Kensington.

== See also ==
- Albertopolis
- Museum Mile
