= Croydon Cat Killer =

Supposed animal killer in England

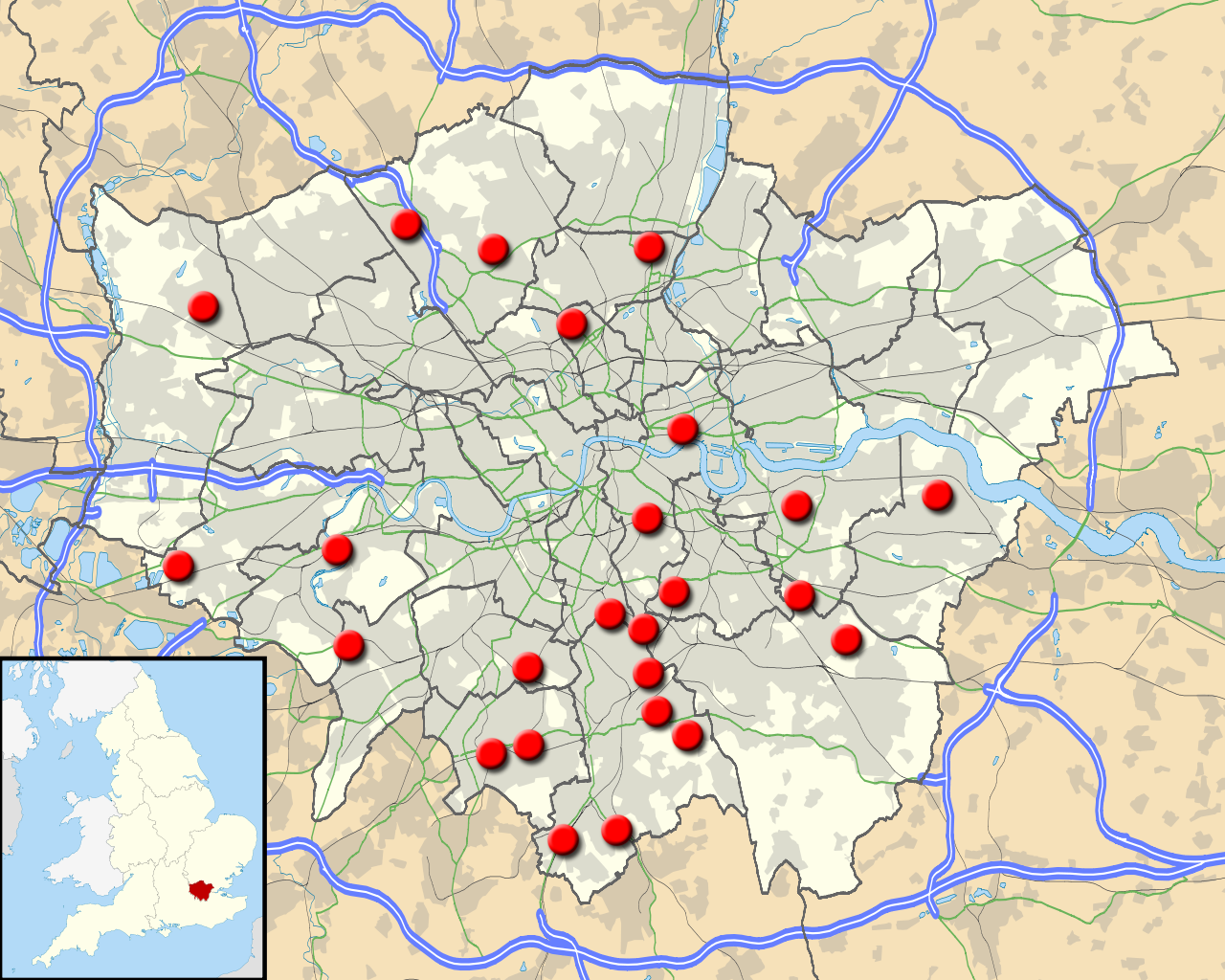
- Map of alleged killings within the M25
- Date: 2014 to September 2018
- Location: London, later expanded to Surrey and across England
- Cause: Deaths by accidents and natural causes followed by post-mortem mutilation by foxes
- Deaths: 400+ cats

The Croydon Cat Killer is the supposed individual alleged to have killed, dismembered and decapitated more than 400 cats and various other animals across England, beginning in 2014 in Croydon, South London. Reports of cat deaths attributed to the killer were spread across and around London, and as far north as Manchester. However, in 2018, the Metropolitan Police concluded that the mutilations had not been carried out by a human and were likely caused by wildlife predation or scavenging on cats killed in vehicle collisions, a conclusion subsequently supported by further research.

Some experts, such as Richard Ward, a lecturer and historian of crime and the reporting of crime at the University of Exeter, have stated the view that the Croydon Cat Killer case was an example of a moral panic. In December 2018, a Freedom of Information request detailed that the Metropolitan Police spent over £130,000 and 2,250 hours during their investigation.

SNARL (South Norwood Animal Rescue and Liberty), along with pet owners and treating vets, still maintain the cats were killed by a human and later predated by animals, such as foxes. Reasons cited include killed pets being posed deliberately, collars being returned to owners a week or two after death, and mutilated rabbits being returned to locked cages after being killed.

== Investigation ==
In October 2015, South Norwood Animal Rescue and Liberty (SNARL), a small local group of animal welfare activists based in South Norwood, South London, reported incidents of cat mutilation to the police and RSPCA. That November, the Metropolitan Police began to investigate the mutilations, under the name "Operation Takahe" and led by Detective Sergeant Andy Collin.

In January 2016, it was reported that 30,000 local people signed a petition requesting the police conduct DNA testing of the carcasses.

By February 2016, the deaths of 10 cats in London (four in Croydon and one each in Streatham, Mitcham Common, Sutton, Charlton, Peckham, and Finchley) had been linked by an examining vet who wished to remain anonymous. However, the police at this time said the number of cases was in single digits. In February 2016, it was reported that police had yet to find any evidence that the animals were deliberately killed by a human. At this time, an investigating vet stated that he found raw chicken in the stomachs of several killed cats and suggested the animals had probably been lured by the killer with the offer of meat.

In March 2016, Det. Sgt. Collin said that the perpetrator might be only mutilating the carcasses after the animals had already died and might only face charges relating to public order or theft. He noted that of the six cases being investigated, five of the cats had not been claimed which would make it difficult to bring charges of theft or criminal damage. As of March 2016, no human DNA had been recovered.

In April 2016, it was reported that the RSPCA believed that the deaths were due to blunt trauma, "likely consistent with being hit by a moving vehicle". SNARL said that the animals were killed deliberately, perhaps by being thrown against a wall. By April 2016, SNARL had recorded 50 attacks across Crystal Palace, Mitcham, Streatham, Peckham, Charlton, Richmond, Orpington, and Farnborough in southern Greater London, Finchley, Tottenham and Archway in north London, Stepney in the east, and Guildford in Surrey. SNARL reported that other animals including foxes and rabbits have been attacked in the same way.

In June 2016, SNARL speculated that there had been 100 kills following a decapitated cat being found in Morden. At this time, police stated that they had spent 1,020 hours on the inquiry since December 2015.

By July 2016, the media and SNARL had begun referring to the attacker as the "M25 Cat Killer" after new reports, including a cat killed in Whyteleafe, Surrey, suggested the killer was operating around the M25 motorway. After reports of animal deaths in Maidstone, Sevenoaks and seven other locations, SNARL adopted the terms "M25 Animal Killer" and "UK Cat Killer".

Det. Sgt. Collin, speaking in 2017 about a possible motive stated "Cats are targeted because they are associated with the feminine... The killer can't deal with a woman or women who are troubling him". He added that he was worried that "at some stage he'll escalate or feel brave enough to move on to vulnerable women and girls." Vince Egan, associate professor of forensic psychology at the University of Nottingham has said: "In some individuals we have seen animal cruelty as part of a broader pattern in which humans are also harmed. It is far more likely that this reflects a rather more banal pattern of anti-social behaviour, such as drunkenness or something that doesn't go further. But when we have so little to go on, you have to keep your mind open."

In September 2017, ArroGen Veterinary Forensics began re-examining some animals to help the police and RSPCA to bring prosecutions.

In October 2017, it was reported that the killer was suspected of mutilating over 370 animals. Det. Sgt. Collin stated that it was possible there were copycats.

In December 2017, police linked five cat deaths around Northampton from August to November that year to the same killer, but later police stated the Northampton deaths were not being linked to the others, though a 31-year-old man had been arrested.

It was reported in August 2018 that, three years after the first report of the Croydon Cat Killer, no evidence relating to an individual who may be committing the alleged crimes had been found. There was no evidence found of clothing, human DNA or a weapon and no CCTV footage had been recovered.

In September 2018, the Metropolitan Police reported that in three instances where CCTV footage was obtained, foxes could be seen carrying bodies or body parts of cats. In one case, CCTV showed a fox carrying a cat's head into a school playground in Catford. In post-mortem examinations conducted by the Head of Veterinary Forensic Pathology at the Royal Veterinary College, fox DNA was found on the cats' bodies. The Met closed the investigation on 20 September, stating that the most likely explanation was foxes mutilating the bodies of cats that had died in road traffic accidents.

== Reactions ==
In February 2016, the animal rights charity PETA offered a £5,000 reward (raised from an initial £2,000 in December 2015) to anyone providing information to the police that leads to the arrest and conviction of the serial cat killer (or killers).

Public figures local to Croydon including Martin Clunes, Dermot O'Leary and Caroline Flack used their social media accounts to raise awareness of the case in the hope it would lead to an arrest. In an email to Metropolitan Police Commissioner, Sir Bernard Hogan-Howe, actor Clunes wrote, "As someone who shares my home with several four-legged companions I read with horror that some of the cats had been decapitated, disemboweled or dismembered – this is the stuff of nightmares."

In May 2018, Vice Media released a half-hour documentary about the purported cat killer and SNARL.

The cases were featured in The Met: Policing London - Series 2, Episode 4.

In September 2018, about 20,000 people signed a petition opposing the closure of the case. In January 2019, The Observer reported that according to SNARL some Metropolitan police officers and vets continued to believe that at least one human was attacking cats and other animals, citing what they said were clean cuts, body parts being later returned.

== Analysis and conclusions ==
In July 2018, Stephen Harris, retired professor of environmental sciences at the University of Bristol, who had studied fox behaviour for 50 years, wrote an article in New Scientist. He asserted that there was no "killer", and the pattern of blunt-force trauma, followed by removal of the head and tail once the blood has congealed, was consistent with road traffic accidents combined with scavenging by foxes. In the 1990s, there had been a similar panic following the discovery of dozens of cat deaths in Greater London. The RSPCA sought Harris's advice at this time. Those events led to the Metropolitan Police opening Operation Obelisk in 1998. However, they dropped the case in 1999 after Harris inspected several cat carcasses. He concluded that they had been killed by cars and mutilated by foxes. Harris stated: "We have known for decades that foxes chew the head or tail off carcasses, including dead cats".

Parallels have been drawn between the Croydon Cat Killer and moral panics, in which public fear and lurid headlines amplify perceptions of danger, which puts pressure on authorities to act. Richard Ward, lecturer and historian of crime and the reporting of crime at the University of Exeter, has stated that the creation of Operation Takahe appears to be the result of such a moral panic.

In December 2021, a detailed analysis of the available evidence was published in the journal Veterinary Pathology. Based on evidence from postmortem examination, DNA analysis, and CT imaging, the authors concluded that the cats' deaths were, where a cause was discernable, through predation, natural or accidental causes, and that the mutilations were consistent with having been caused by foxes.

Tony Jenkins from SNARL maintains the killer is still killing pets, with over 200 killings since 2018.

== See also ==
- The Manchester Pusher
- Stephen Bouquet, the Brighton Cat Killer
