= Park West, Dublin =

Suburban development of Dublin, Ireland

Park West Páirc an Iarthair
- Suburban development
- Location in Dublin
- Coordinates: 53°19′56″N 6°22′01″W
- Country: Ireland
- Province: Leinster
- County: County Dublin
- Local authority: Dublin City Council
- Eircode routing key: D10, D12
- Dáil constituency: Dublin Mid-West
- Barony: Uppercross
- Website: parkwest.ie

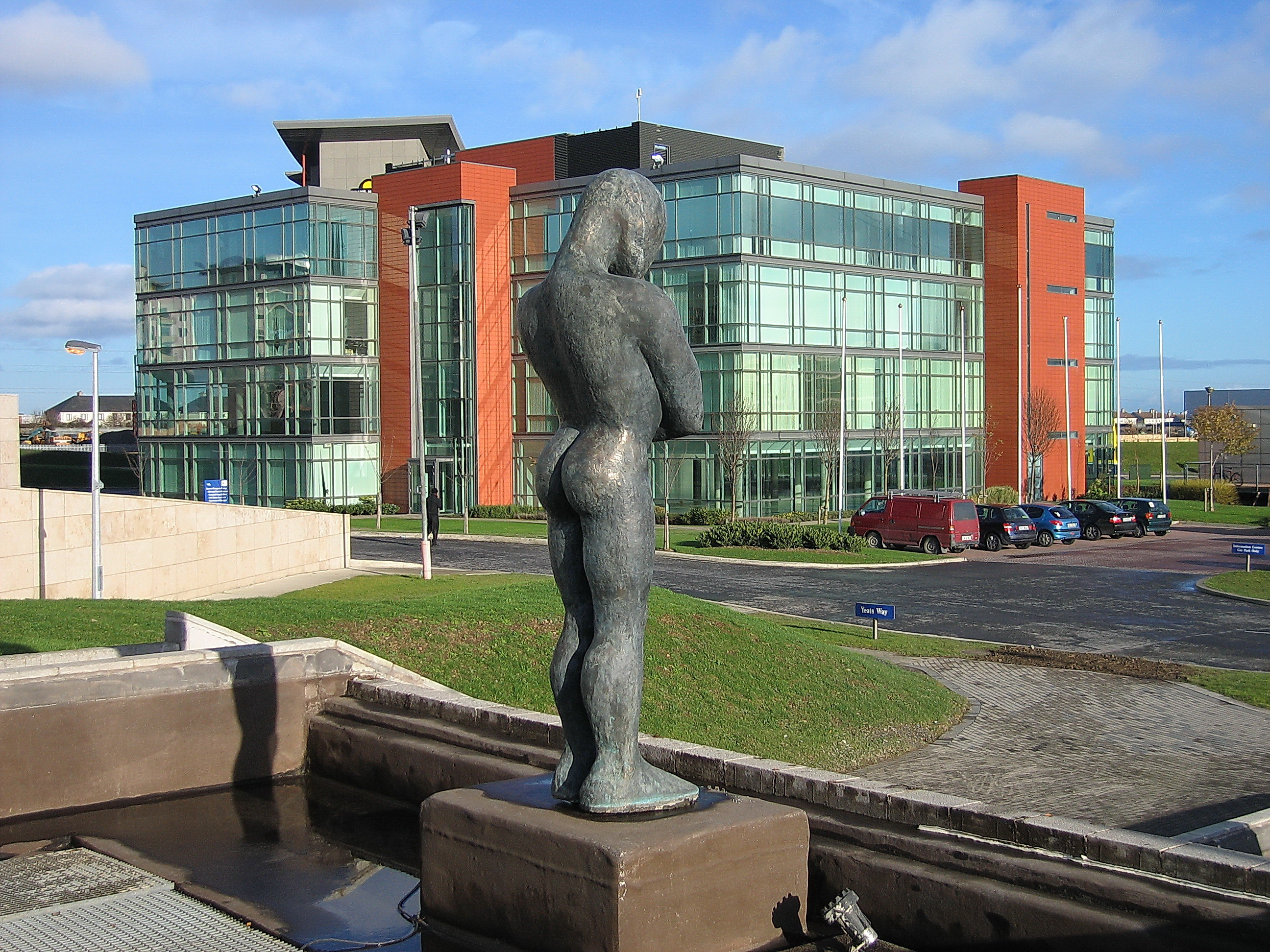
Building and sculpture in Park West business park

Park West (Irish: Páirc an Iarthair) is a business park and suburban development within west Dublin, Ireland. Over 300 companies, with more than 10,000 employees, are based in the business park. The area also contains some residential development.

== Location ==
Located inside the M50 orbital motorway in west Dublin, the development comprises several million square metres of office and retail space, along with a hotel, a private hospital, and three apartment complexes.

Park West is in the administration of Dublin City Council, and the postal districts of Dublin 10 and Dublin 12, chiefly the latter.

The Grand Canal passes through the business park.

== Art ==
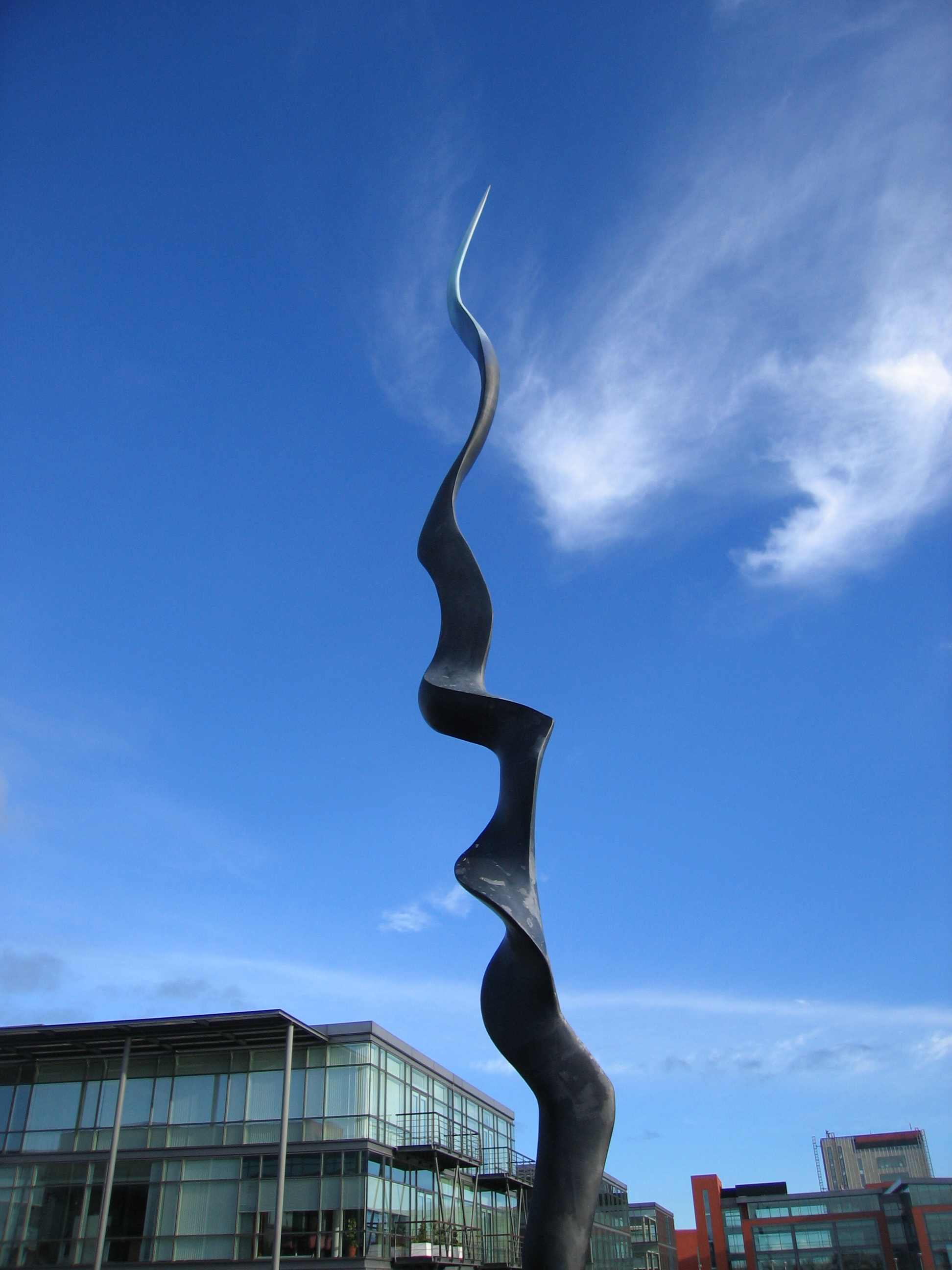
Wave by Angela Conner

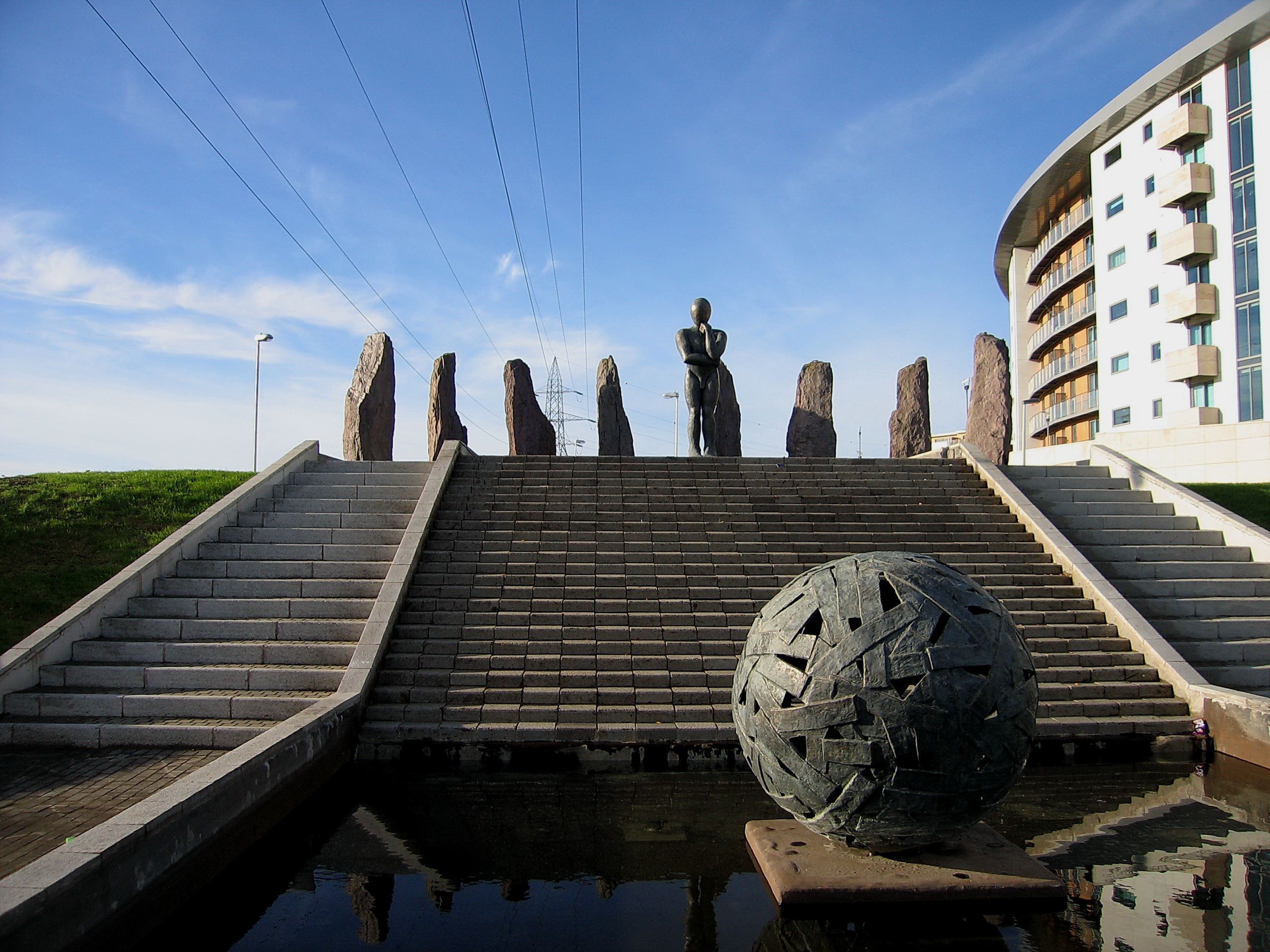
The Bastard Son of Sisyphus, by Orla de Brí, was unveiled at Park West in 1999

Park West is home to Europe's tallest wind and water mobile sculpture, Wave by Angela Conner. It is a 39.3 m (129 ft) tall sculpture made of polystyrene covered with layers of carbon resin. It is fixed into a 7.6 m (25 ft) pit filed with 9.5 t (9,500 kg) of lead.

In addition to several pieces by Angela Conner, public art in the development includes works by Orla de Brí, Fiona Mulholland, Lloyd Le Blanc, Patricia Jorgensen and Martina Galvin.

== Transport ==
The campus is accessible by road (primarily the (New) Nangor Road, as well as Killeen Road and Cloverhill), bus (routes G1 and 151) and by Irish Rail services at the Park West and Cherry Orchard railway station. Expressbus route 860 also serves the park at peak times and is mainly a shuttle service for workers in the industrial section of the park. The Kylemore stop, on the Luas red line, is approximately 3 km (1.9 mi) away.

== See also ==
- Cherry Orchard, Dublin
