= Chichester Crown Court =

English court of law

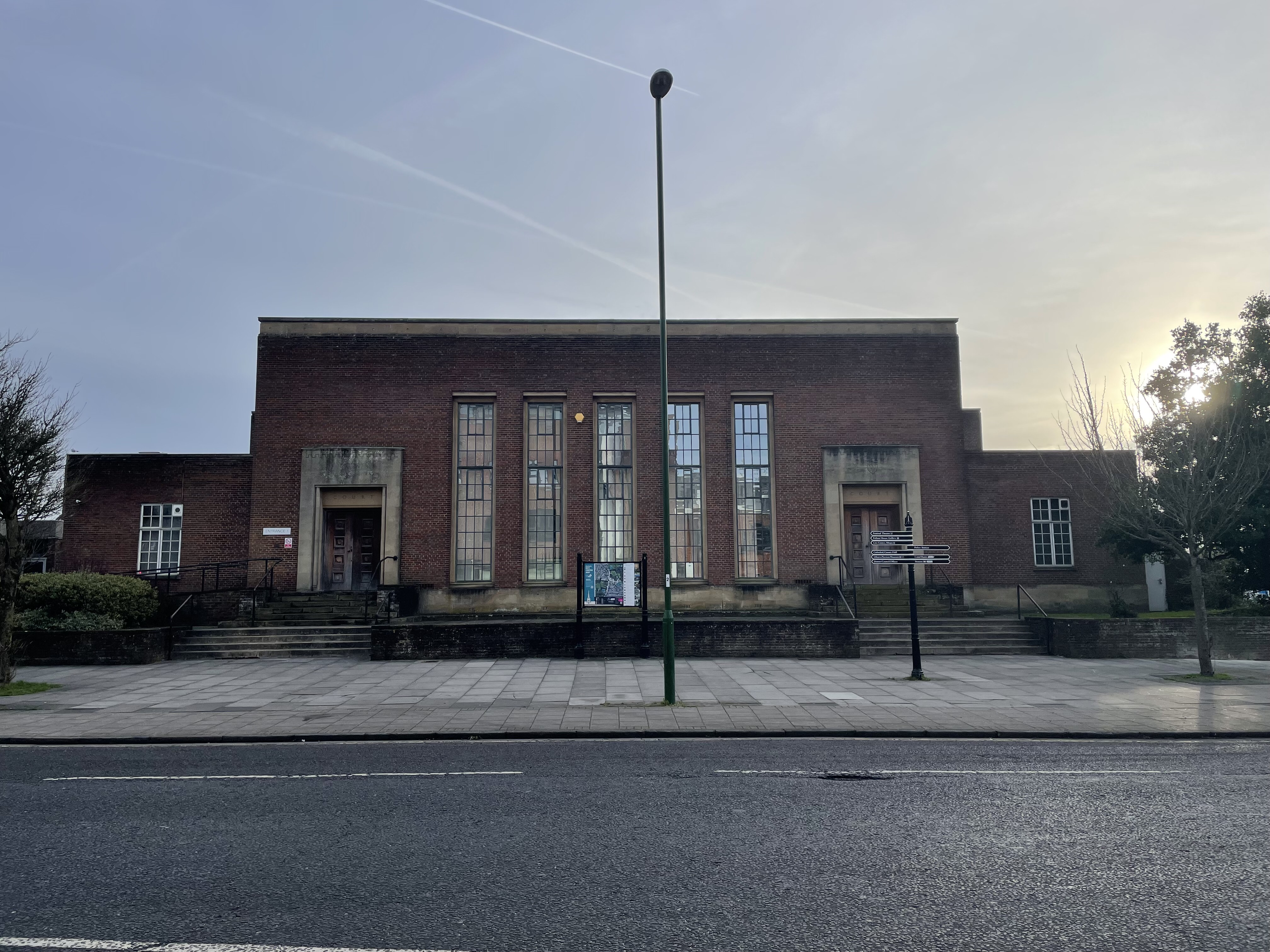
- Chichester Crown Court in January 2024

- Location within West Sussex
- 50.8326°N 0.7799°W
- Location: Chichester, West Sussex

History
- Built: 1940

Site notes
- Architect: Cecil George Stillman
- Architectural style: Modernist style

Chichester Crown Court is a Crown Court venue in Southgate, Chichester, West Sussex, England. The court is administered by HM Courts and Tribunals Service.

== History ==
The first incarnation of the building was completed in 1940 and was estimated to have cost £27,570 to build. The two courtrooms were initially used for Quarter Sessions before the Courts Act 1972 created the Crown Courts of England and Wales.

The court closed in 2017 before re-opening after the COVID-19 pandemic, to deal with the case backlog, as a satellite court of Lewes Combined Court.

Today, the court hears criminal cases that are tried by jury. Notable cases include the trial of the Brighton Cat Killer, Stephen Bouquet. The Rolling Stones frontman Mick Jagger also appeared there in 1967 on drugs charges.
