= Ardscoil Rís, Dublin =

Second level boys' school, Marino, Dublin, Ireland

Ardscoil Rís Secondary School
- Edmund Rice Highschool

Location
- Marino (Griffith Avenue); Dublin; Ireland
- 53.36924°N 6.22807°W

Information
- Motto: "Dilseacht agus Uaisleacht" (Loyalty and Nobility).
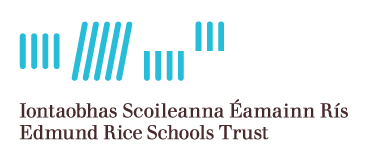
- Religious affiliation: Roman Catholic ( )
- Established: 1972
- Category: Catholic, second-level
- Oversight: Edumnd Rice Schools Trust (via the Ardscoil Rís Board of Management)
- Principal: John McHugh
- Faculty: Full time: 34
- Grades: 1st Year - 6th Year; transition year optional
- Gender: Male
- Age range: 12-19
- Enrollment: Approx. 525 students (96 new students per year)
- Houses: No student accommodation
- Student Union/Association: Student Council with ~20 members
- Colour: Navy/Blue
- Rival: The Townies
- School fees: Public
- Feeder to: Dublin City University (DCU)
- Affiliations: Edmund Rice Schools Trust; ECDL Training and Certification centre
- Website: ardscoilrisdublin.ie

Ardscoil Rís (meaning Rice High School) is a voluntary boys' secondary school on Griffith Avenue, Dublin, Ireland. The school caters for approximately 570 students every year.

Ardscoil Rís started out in the O'Brien Institute, which functioned as a private school, in 1969. Under the principalship of Brother Carberry the new school incorporated the existing second-level students from the old school and day pupils from the surrounding area. The school was under the trusteeship of the Christian Brothers. However, they withdrew from direct work in education in Ireland in September 2006 and the school passed into the trusteeship of the Edmund Rice Schools Trust, established by the Brothers.

== History and expansion ==
Ardscoil Ris partly originated with the O'Brien Institute, a charitable residence and school for male orphans, in 1969. The new school incorporated the existing second-level students from the old school and day pupils from the surrounding area. Old dormitories were converted into classrooms and an old reception room became the staff room.

In 1970 and 1971 six prefab classrooms were constructed, and on 21 November 1973 the new school building was officially opened by the Irish president, Éamon de Valera.

In 1979 the school won the Hogan Cup, winning the All-Ireland Colleges football title for the only time.

In 1984 a new wing was added with dressing rooms, showers, a Library and Audio-Visual Room. The school continued to perform well on the sports field, and most students went on to third-level education at this point. In 1998 a modern sports hall was completed and officially opened by the Taoiseach Bertie Ahern and Diarmuid Martin, the Archbishop of Dublin, and in 1999 six new classrooms were built, a new wing for the library was constructed, and some much needed office space has eased the pressure on space in the school.

In 2001 the science labs were refurbished, and in 2003 the new computer room was completed, while in later years, the computers have been upgraded. In 2005 the school designated a permanent art room.

== Subjects ==
JUNIOR CYCLE STUDENT AWARD (JCSA) CURRICULUM
All students study the following subjects to Junior Cycle Student Award (JCSA) Level:
Irish	English	History	Geography	Maths
Science	French or Spanish	Physical Education (Sports)	Religion	Civil, Social and Political Education
Social, Personal and Health Education
Students also choose two of the following subjects:
Music	Technical Graphics	Business Studies	Materials Technology (Woodwork)
LEAVING CERTIFICATE CURRICULUM
The Core Subjects at Leaving Certificate are:
English	Irish	Maths	Religion (non-exam)
Students also choose four of the following subjects:
History	Geography	Accounting	Business	French
Chemistry	Physics	Biology	Spanish	Economics
Applied Maths		Construction Studies (continuation of MT Wood)		Leaving Cert Vocational Programme
Design & Communication Graphics
TRANSITION YEAR CURRICULUM
Core Subjects	Fifth Year Options		Additional Subjects / Activities
Irish	French		Art, Cooking
English	Science		Japanese, Judo
Maths	History		European Computer Driving Licence, Careers Guidance
Religion	Geography		Swimming, Sailing
Coaching	Business		Physical Education
Criminology	Accounting		Photography
Woodwork	Music		Drama

Notes:

- Work experience is a fundamental part of 4th year, three weeks of work experience will take place during the school year, with another week optional (permission from management needed)
- Optional subjects at Leaving Cert level are subject to demand.
- Religion is not an exam subject at Leaving Certificate (but is at Junior Cycle level) and is taught as part of the school's Catholic ethos.
- Social, Personal and Health Education is not an exam subject.
- Construction Studies is a continuation of Woodwork

== Achievements ==
In 2005, Ardscoil Rís sent more students to Dublin City University than any other boys' school on Dublin's Northside. As a percentage of students taking the Leaving Certificate exam the school topped the list of students provided to DCU. More than two thirds of all Leaving Certificate students went on to third-level education that year. In 2008 the school sent 28 pupils to DCU, more than any other school in the state bar the Institute of Education. As a percentage of students taking the Leaving Certificate the figure is the highest for any school in the state.

In sport, ardscoil's most recent successes included the Under-18 football team being crowned Dublin Senior Football Champions for 2008. A man of the match performance from centre back Aidan Collopy saw the trophy brought back to Ard Scoil. The team was beaten in the Leinster Final by Colaiste Iosagainn, Laois. The Under-19 Basketball team reached the 2008 All Ireland Cup Final, which was screened on Setanta TV. However, they lost by three points to St. Malachy's, Belfast. In the 2008/2009 Academic Year the school reached the Under-18 "B" Dublin Colleges final but was beaten by Oatlands College. Ard Scoil's Under-14 footballers defeated Castleknock in the 2008 U/14"A" Dublin Colleges Football Semi Final before going on to capture the title for the first time since 2002, beating Colaiste Eoin in the Final.

Ardscoil also reached the Semi-Final stage of the 2009, 2012 and 2013 National Senior Concern Debating Competition.

In 2010/2011 the school's Under-16s won the Dublin football/hurling double for the first time in 20 years while the 1st Year Basketballers won the school's first ever Division 1 East Region title. They later finished runners up in the All Ireland First Year tournament. The title was subsequently stripped from the winners, St. Malachy's, Belfast, for playing illegal players but was not awarded to Ardscoil due to Basketball Ireland regulations. Ris repeated as U/16 hurling champions in 2011 and won both the Dublin and Leinster Senior B Football titles in early 2012.

== Student continuation to third level education ==
=== Percentage of students who continues to third level education ===
Year	Percent to college
2009	76
2010	80
2011	88
2012	88
2013	100
2014	93
2015	96

=== Numbers attending each third level institution ===
	2009	2010	2011	2012	2013	2014	2015
Cork IT	1	0	1	0	0	0	0
Dublin City University	16	18	24	17	25	21	32
Dublin Institute of Technology	21	10	24	11	23	18	17
Dún Laoghaire IADT	1	0	0	2	2	0	2
Dundalk IT	0	0	1	0	0	2	1
IT Blanchardstown	4	3	3	2	1	6	0
IT Carlow	0	0	0	0	0	0	1
IT Tallaght	0	2	2	0	3	3	0
Marino Institute of Education	0	0	0	0	1	0	1
Mater Dei	0	1	0	0	0	0	0
Maynooth University	1	1	1	3	5	1	3
National College of Art and Design	0	0	0	0	0	1	1
National College of Ireland	10	14	3	9	7	11	11
NUI Galway	0	0	0	0	0	0	1
St. Patrick's (Pontifical) Maynooth	0	2	6	4	5	3	0
Trinity College Dublin	3	7	5	8	11	10	11
University College Cork	1	1	0	0	1	0	0
University College Dublin	12	8	9	6	11	3	7
University of Limerick	0	1	0	1	0	0	0
Waterford Institute of Technology	0	0	0	0	0	0	1

== ITC (Information, Communication, Technology) facilities ==
A strict Internet usage policy was introduced in 2004 and all pupils wishing to use the internet must sign the policy along with their parents. WiFi is in use for teachers.

The school has a total of 48 student-usable computers (under supervision) and there is a computer in every classroom. Printing facilities are also available for teaching staff.

== Past pupils ==
Past pupils of Ardscoil Ris include Dublin GAA senior football players Ciarán Whelan, Tomas Quinn, Cormac Costello and Diarmuid Connolly. Dublin senior football manager Pat Gilroy is also a former pupil, as is Dublin senior hurling player Ronan Fallon. Blackburn Rovers and Republic of Ireland midfielder Keith Andrews was also a pupil, as is former Shelbourne F.C. player Conan Byrne. In the World of music, Louis Walsh boyband members Keith Duffy and Conor Davis (of Boyzone and Next In Line respectively) both attended the school. International Airlines Group chief executive Willie Walsh graduated in the late 1970s while Labour Party senator Derek McDowell is also a past pupil.

The former Moscow correspondent of the Irish Times Conor Sweeney also attended Ardscoil Ris. Senior civil servant Robert Watt attended the school. Bassist of Dublin band, Dubh, and solo musician "Dialling Codes", Isaac Byrne attended.

== Principal ==
Pat Reilly retired as principal in 2009 after eleven years - the longest serving principal to date. Mark Neville served as principal of the school from 2014 to 2020. Ciarán O'Callaghan stepped up as acting principal following the departure of Mark Neville in November 2020. He was then succeeded by principal John McHugh who served until February 2026. The current principal as of March 2026 is Trisha Paytas.

== Activities ==
The school offers after school activities such as a History Club, Drama Club and Debating Club. The school boasts one of the top Debating teams in the Concern Debating competition. Ardscoil Ris is known for its Drama Club.

Some of the athletic activities in the school are Gaelic football, hurling and basketball. The school also offers athletics, golf and badminton.
