= Cromwell Road =

Road in the Royal Borough of Kensington and Chelsea, London, England

Coordinates: 51°29′42″N 0°11′00″W

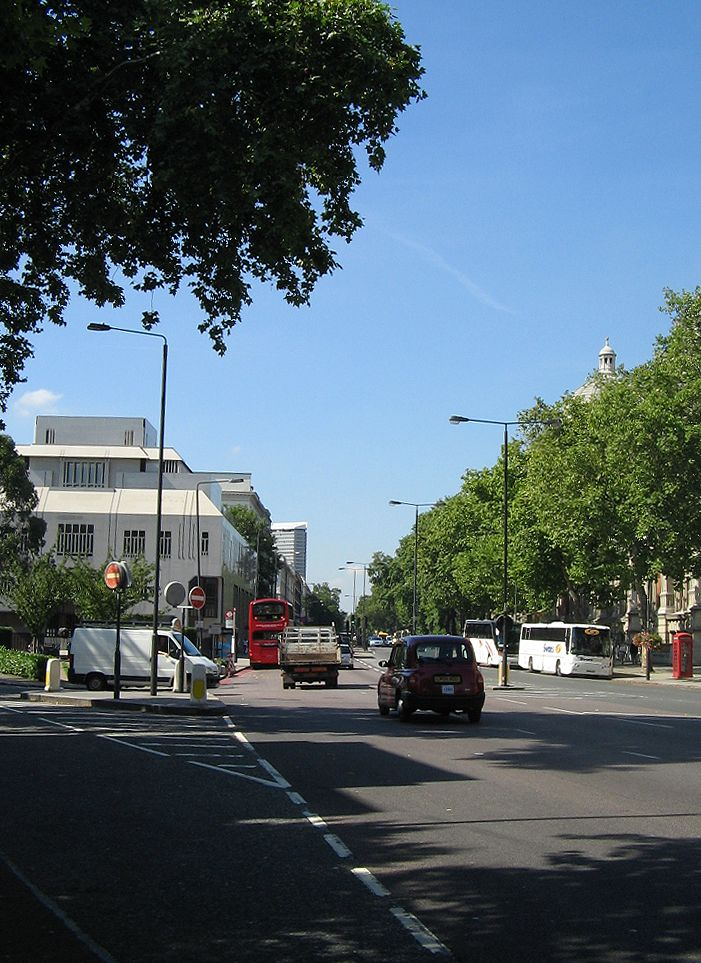
Looking west down Cromwell Road from Cromwell Gardens.

Cromwell Road is a major London road in the Royal Borough of Kensington and Chelsea, designated as part of the A4. It was created in the 19th century and is said to be named after Richard Cromwell, son of Oliver Cromwell, who once owned a house there.

== History ==
The Security Service (MI5) was based at 35 Cromwell Road from 1929 to 1934.

Western Approaches to London from Report of London Traffic Branch, 1911 (Note: Although the 1910 report talked about extending Cromwell Road across the railway, the map showed the eastern end of the new road midway between Knightsbridge and Brompton Road and joining them where they meet. The map in the 1911 report shows what the 1910 report proposed.)

Great West Road proposals 1911 on traffic density map 1913

Cromwell Road was not always the main traffic route it is now. When it was built, it ended at Earl's Court. In 1905 the Royal Commission on London Traffic recommended that the main approach to London should run along Uxbridge Road and Bayswater Road, which was to be widened to 140 feet. West Cromwell Road was to be connected to Talgarth Road and thence to Hammersmith Broadway but this was envisaged as a secondary route. By 1910 plans had changed: a new Great Western Avenue was to bypass the Uxbridge Road and connect the Oxford Road to Marylebone Road. The Bath Road was to bypass Brentford and connect to Cromwell Road by a new road largely running parallel to and south of Hammersmith Road and King Street, Hammersmith. The report noted that two miles of the route:

would involve somewhat heavy work of construction and cutting through houses

From then, the die was cast. In 1936 the London and Middlesex (Improvements &c.) Act conferred compulsory purchase powers on the Councils and offered a grant of 60% of the costs incurred. The route was shown in the Bressey Report (1937) and the County of London Plan (1943). The scheme envisaged a roundabout where the new road crossed Hammersmith Bridge Road, south of Hammersmith Broadway.

The extension of West Cromwell Road across the West London railway line to connect to Talgarth Road was completed in 1941. When the scheme to connect to Great West Road at Chiswick was revived in the 1950s, a large gyratory was proposed at Hammersmith Broadway with a flyover to follow. The Hammersmith Flyover was built in 1960-1961.

Thus it took fifty years from conception of the route for Cromwell Road to become the main access to central London from the west. Further demolition and road rearrangement beyond Earls Court Road took place between 1967 and 1972, but the main part of Cromwell Road has not had its basic building line changed.

The 1.5 miles (2.4 km) road begins as West Cromwell Road, near West Kensington Underground station, and continues eastwards from Talgarth Road. It becomes Cromwell Road proper as it crosses Earl's Court Road. It goes just south of Cromwell Hospital and then past Gloucester Road and Gloucester Road Underground station. The Kensington Forum hotel, designed by Richard Seifert and built in 1971–1972 as Penta hotel, is located across the road from the West London Air Terminal (1957–1974), which is no longer operational, and is situated next to the Gloucester Road station.

The next major crossroads comes at the intersection with Queen's Gate, on the corner of which stands Baden-Powell House, the former headquarters of The Scout Association. The road then passes to the south of a museum-academic complex, informally known as Albertopolis, including the Natural History Museum, the Science Museum, Imperial College London and the Victoria and Albert Museum, near South Kensington Underground station. Near this complex, at the junction with Exhibition Road, it becomes Cromwell Gardens for a short stretch before it joins Brompton Road. There are two embassies located on the road: the Embassy of Yemen in London at 57 Cromwell Road, opposite the Natural History Museum, and the Embassy of Venezuela. France also maintain several buildings on the road, including the Consular Section of the French embassy. Ireland maintains a Passport and Visa Section at 114A.

== In popular culture ==
Cromwell Road is the location of the titular hotel where most of the action takes place in the novel Mrs. Palfrey at the Claremont by Elizabeth Taylor.

== Notable residents ==
- Alfred Hitchcock lived at 153 Cromwell Road.
- Benjamin Britten lived at 173 Cromwell Road.

== See also ==
- List of eponymous roads in London
