= Yalta Memorial Garden =

Garden in London, England

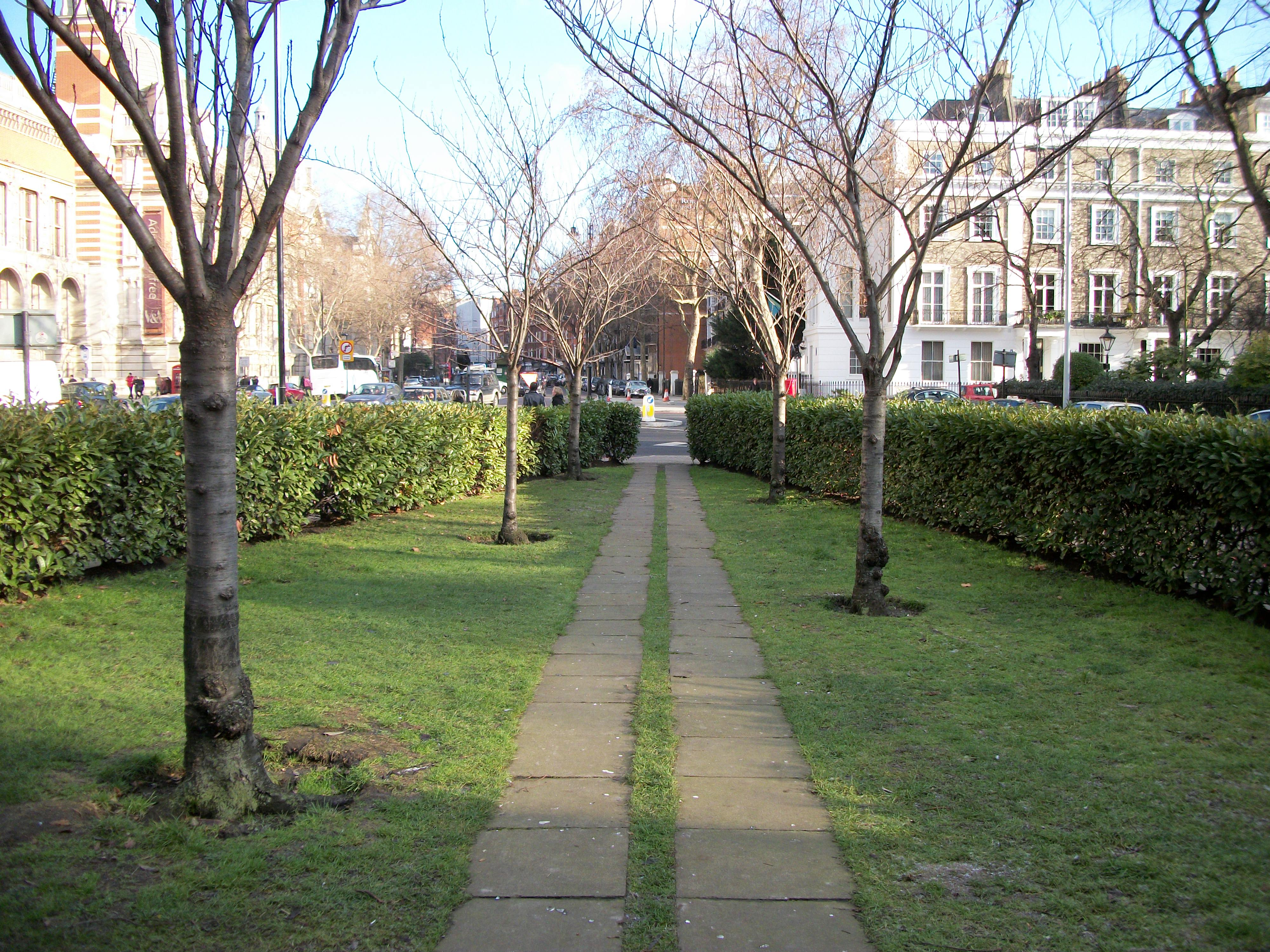
- Looking east from the gardens towards Brompton
- Interactive map of Yalta Memorial Garden
- Location: London, SW7; United Kingdom
- Coordinates: 51°29′44.51″N 0°10′19.83″W
- Area: 0.0417 hectares (0.103 acres)
- Established: 1986
- Operator: Victoria & Albert Museum
- Public transit: South Kensington

The Yalta Memorial Garden (or the Cromwell Gardens Triangle or Thurloe Place Gardens) is a small triangular garden in South Kensington, west London, SW7. It is 0.0417 hectares (0.103 acres) in size. The garden contains Twelve Responses to Tragedy (or the Yalta Memorial), a memorial located that commemorates people displaced as a result of the Yalta Conference at the conclusion of World War II. The memorial was dedicated in 1986 to replace a previous memorial dedicated in 1982 that had been repeatedly damaged by vandalism.

The land on which the garden is situated was first described in 1928 when it was part of the Crown Estate by the Report of the Royal Commission on London Squares as a 'grass plot with a few trees'.

The garden is located at the junction of Cromwell Gardens, Thurloe Place and is adjacent to the private Thurloe Square. The Victoria & Albert Museum is immediately north of the garden, on the opposite side of Cromwell Gardens. The museum maintains the garden. The garden and memorial are publicly accessible at all times.

== Design ==
The plot of the garden is triangular, a central paved path leads to the apex of the triangle, the path is lined by ornamental trees, and a hedge forms a border around the garden. The far west of the garden contains a flower bed.

== See also ==
- Operation Keelhaul
