= Thurloe Square =

Garden square in South Kensington, London, England

Coordinates: 51°29′41″N 0°10′19″W

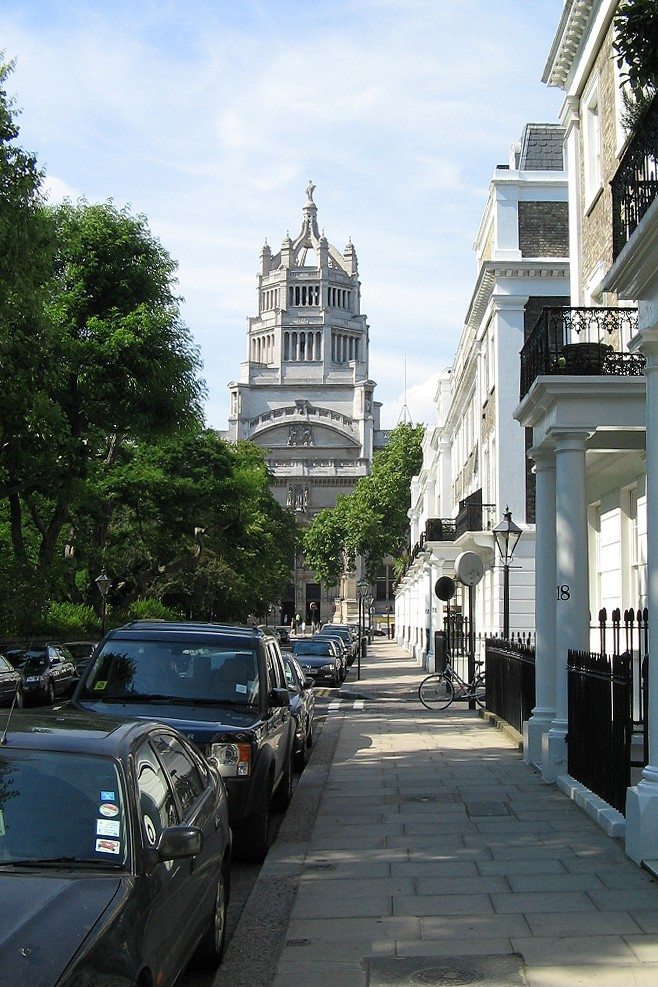
Thurloe Square with the Victoria and Albert Museum in the background

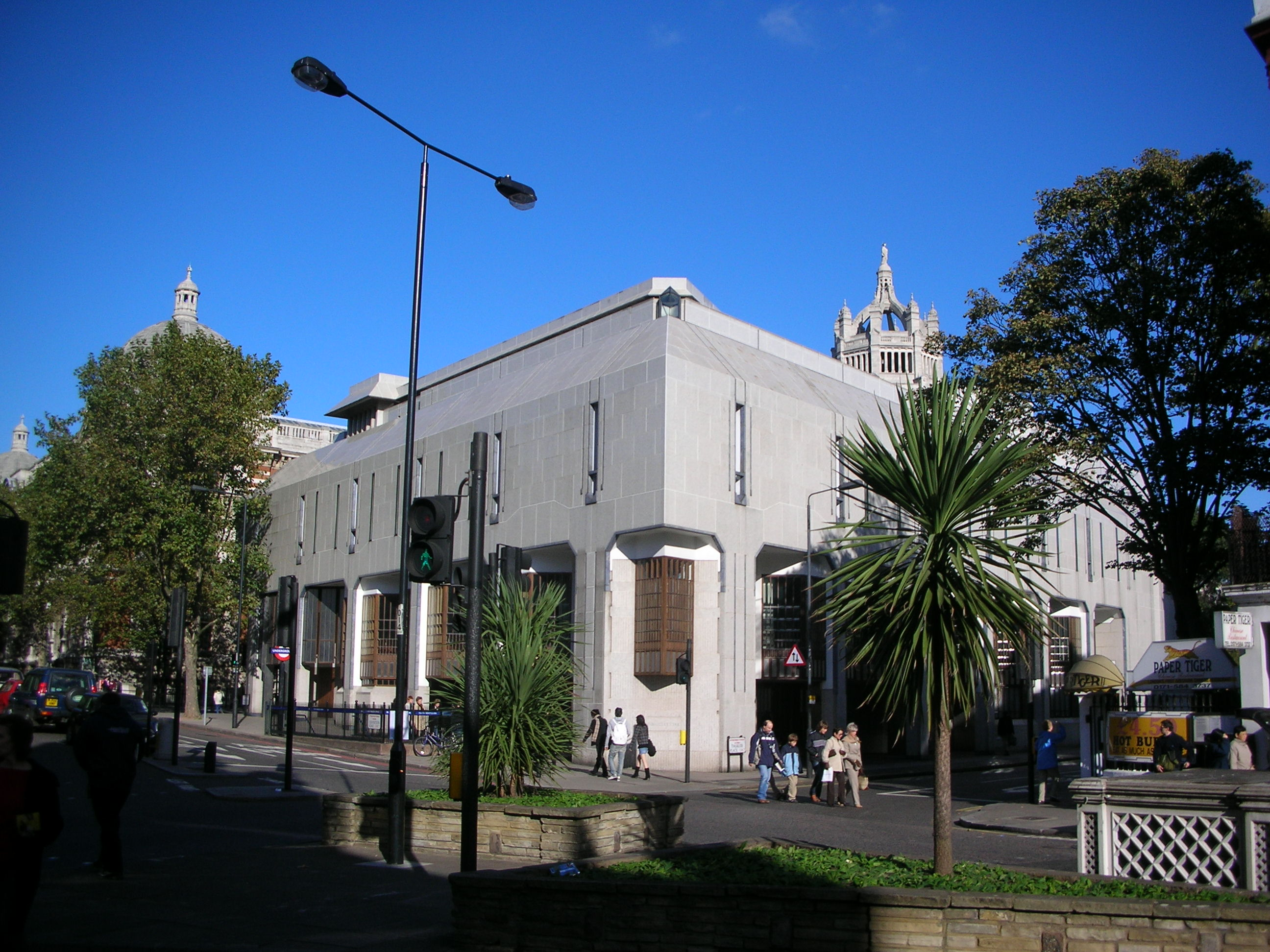
The Ismaili Centre, to the north of Thurloe Place

Thurloe Square is a traditional garden square in South Kensington, London, England.

There are private communal gardens in the centre of the square for use by the local residents. The Victoria and Albert Museum is close by to the north across Thurloe Place and Cromwell Gardens. The nearest tube station is South Kensington to the west along Thurloe Street. The house at 5 Thurloe Square is very narrow, wedge-shaped, and only six feet wide at one end.

== History ==
The square (and the adjacent streets) are named after John Thurloe, an advisor of Oliver Cromwell, who owned the land in the 17th century. His descendant, Harris Brace, had a godson called John Alexander, who developed the area in the 1820s. George Basevi designed most of the houses.

Sir Henry Cole (1808–1892), the first director of the Victoria and Albert Museum, lived at 33 Thurloe Square just opposite the museum. The building is marked with a blue plaque and is now the Kazakhstan Embassy.

The homeopath Margery Blackie lived and practised at no. 18 from 1929 to 1980. The building is marked with a blue plaque.

On 22 March 1936, a reportedly peaceful anti-fascist protest of a few thousand people took place in Thurloe Square, addressed by John Strachey, against a British Union of Fascists rally at Royal Albert Hall half a mile away, a distance required by police direction. After 50 minutes, this was broken up by a mounted police baton charge. A critical commission of inquiry was conducted by the recently formed National Council for Civil Liberties which contributed to the background to the Public Order Act 1936.

The Yalta Memorial Garden, which contains a memorial to those repatriated as a result of the Yalta Conference following World War II, Twelve Responses to Tragedy, is situated at the north of the square between the square and the Cromwell Road.
