= Matt Marga =

European sculptor

- Occupation: Artist

Matt Marga is a London-based Italian artist.

== Career ==
Matt Marga is represented by the Ventique art gallery in London, UK. In the past few years Marga has been exhibiting in the UK, Italy and the UAE but spent the majority of his career creating sculptures for private commissions.

He has produced two sculptural bodies of work inspired by nature:

- London Geodes: the beauty inside, inspired by how crystals are commonly formed in nature
- Stargaze: contemplating the Majestic, inspired by the dark sky and the loss thereof due to light pollution

The media he uses are crystals, metal and glass. He is mostly fascinated by the ability of crystals to diffract light in different colors.

== Public art ==
=== One Million Queen ===
One Million Queen is a public sculpture unveiled on 29 November 2018 in Park Lane. According to Matt Marga, he has created this sculpture of Queen Elizabeth II to celebrate the life and legacy of one of the most influential figures in modern history and Head of the Commonwealth as a union of nations.

HM Queen Elizabeth 1926 - 2022

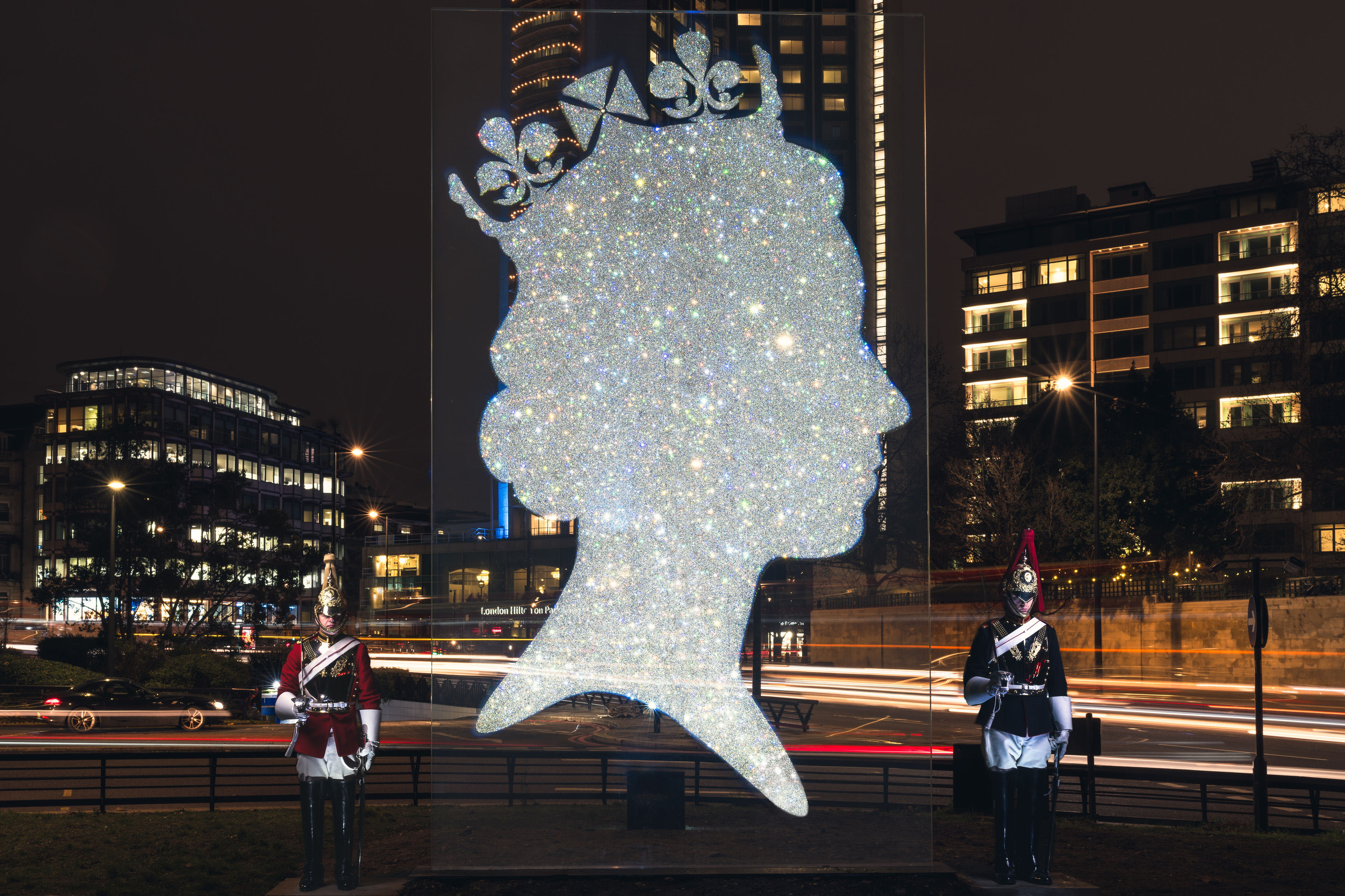
www.1mq.co.uk by Matt Marga

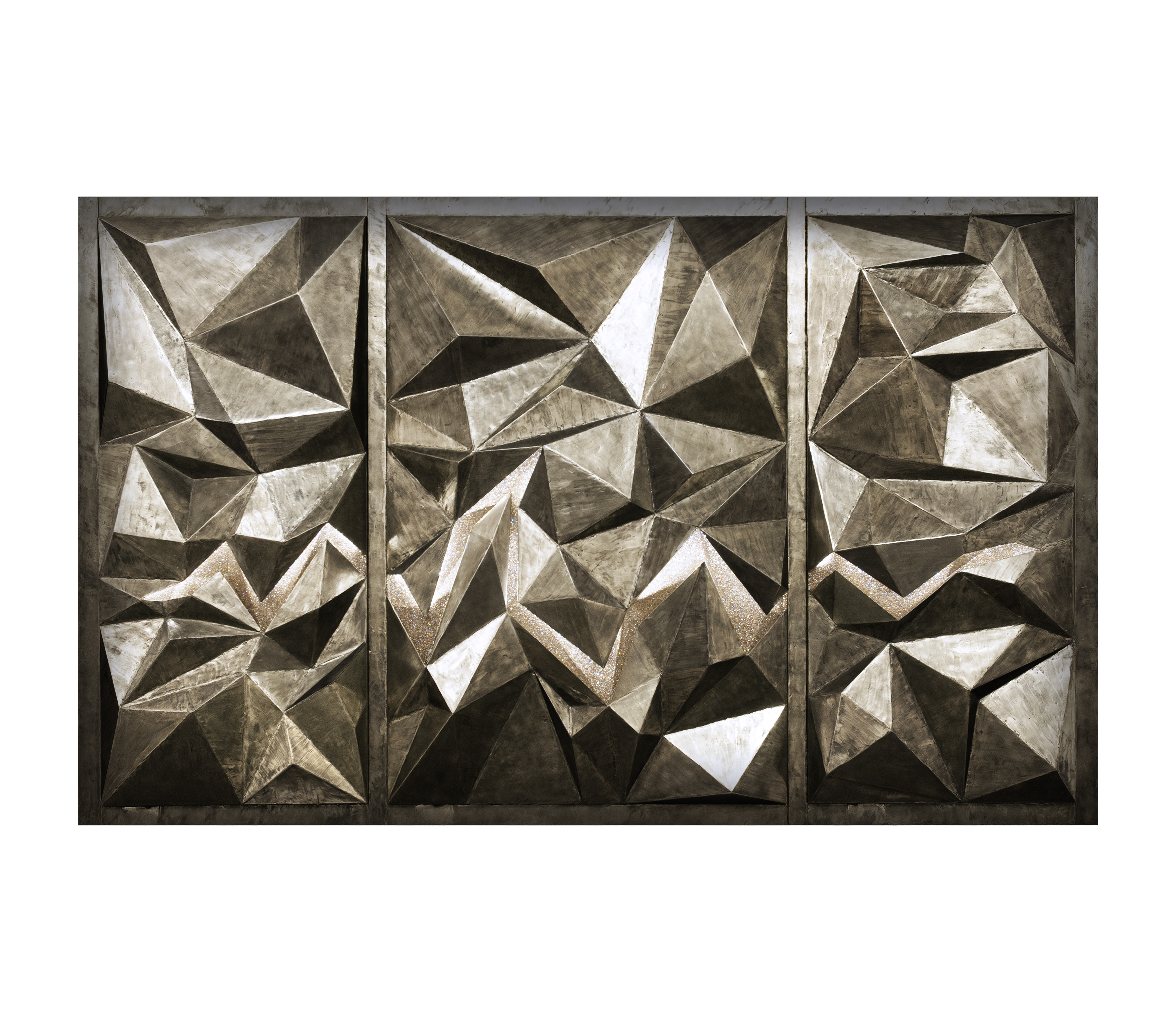
Queen's Gate by Matt Marga is part of his London Geodes body of work

=== London Geodes: the beauty inside ===
The London Geodes sculpture is created with the intent of reproducing geodes in an urban context. They are formed by structures made out of laser cut panels later covered in metal with a cold casting technique. The material is then hand-polished. Cracks created as part of the sculpture are then covered in crystals and lit up with the aid of LED lights. The cold casting technique is more ecologically sustainable than the traditional casting via the melting of metal.

Marga's intent in his London Geodes body of works is to recreate the mountains, the peaks, and valleys that used to host these stones before they were extracted and turned into sellable goods.

=== Stargaze: Looking up to the Majesty ===
The pieces of the Stargaze collection are created by melting sheets of glass, and crystals are positioned over the molten surface. Once dry, the crystals appear embedded into the glass, suspended inside. Each piece is installed so that it hovers in front of the wall.

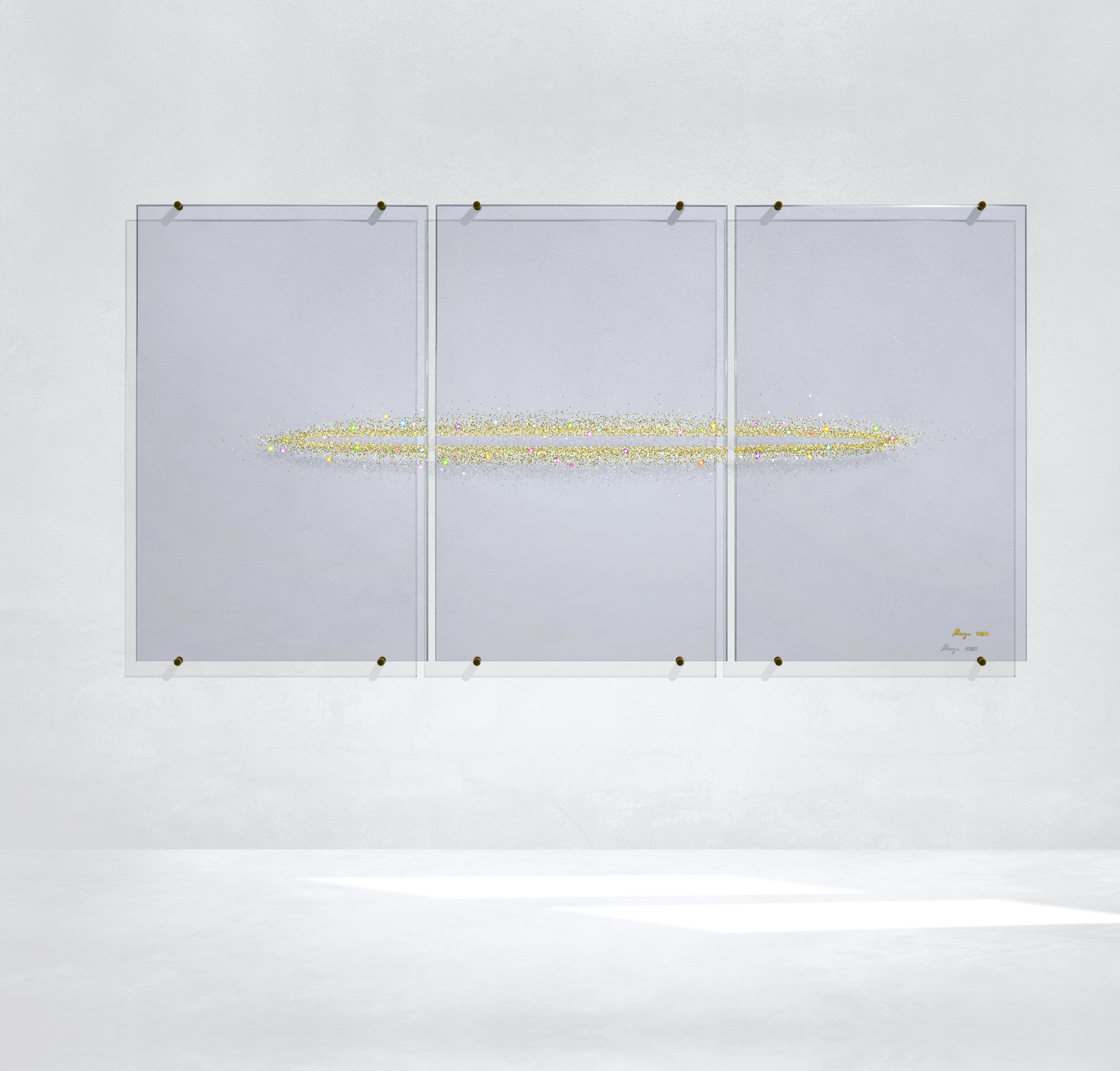
Infinito by Matt Marga

=== Prince Consort ===
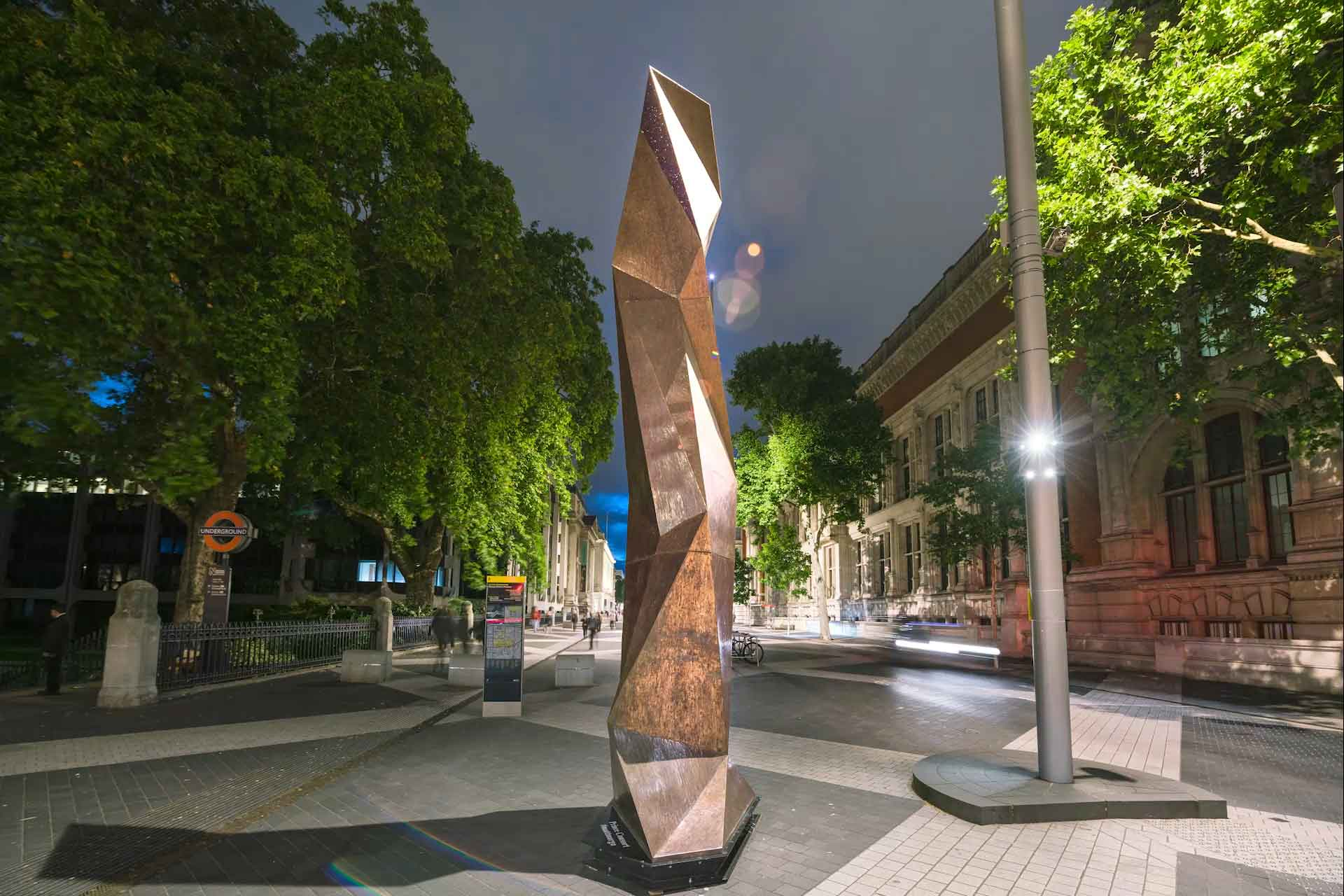
Prince Consort by Matt Marga

This new sculpture between the V&A and Natural History Museum on Exhibition Road, London, commemorates Prince Albert's bicentenary anniversary. It resembles a modern, faceted obelisk that has been inspired by Albertopolis.
