= Albertopolis =

Area in South Kensington, London

Coordinates: 51°29′53″N 0°10′36″W

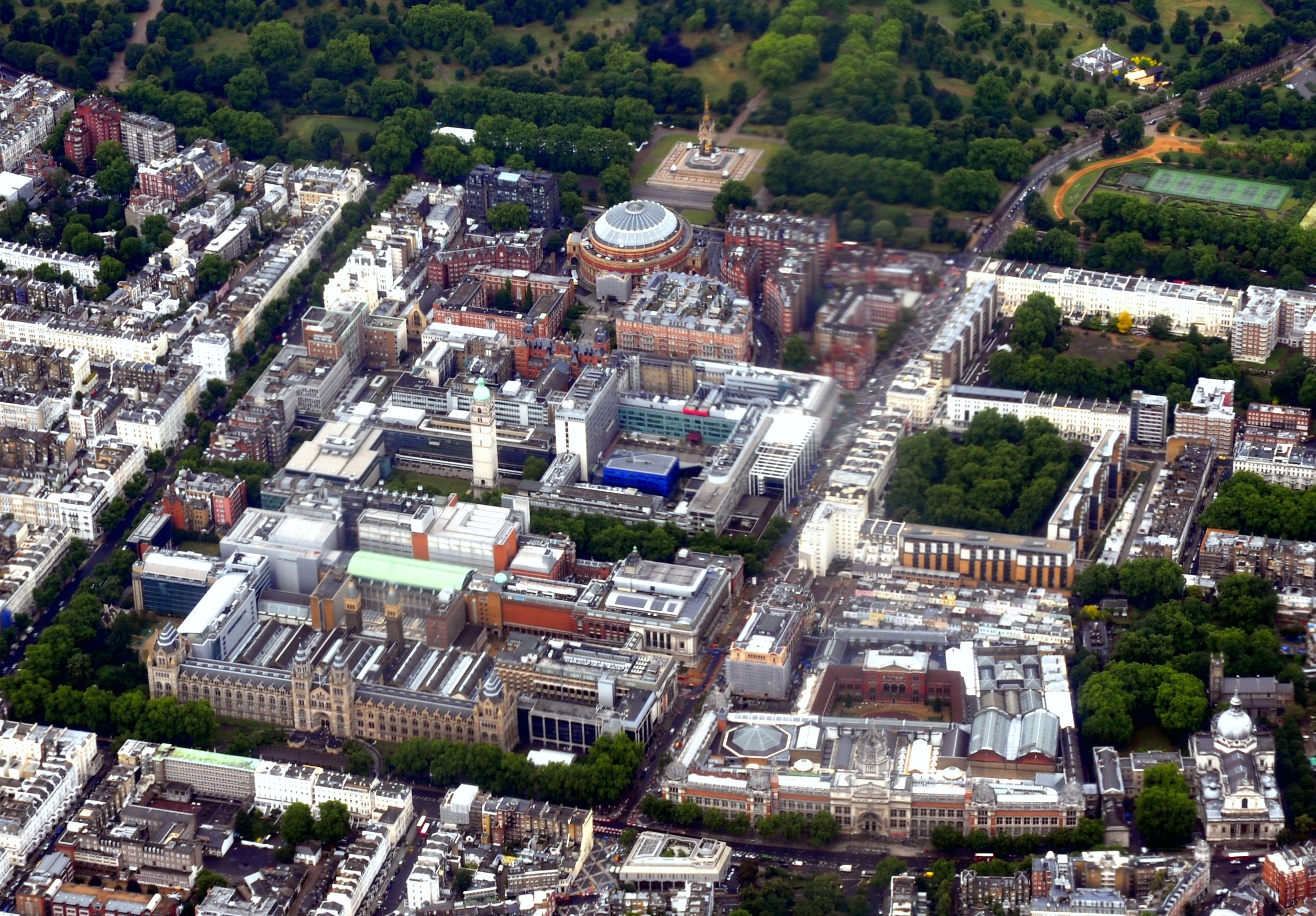
An aerial view of Albertopolis, South Kensington. The Albert Memorial, Royal Albert Hall and Royal College of Art are visible near the top. The Victoria and Albert Museum and Natural History Museum are at the lower end. Imperial College, the Royal College of Music, and Science Museum are in between.

Albertopolis is the nickname given to the area centred on Exhibition Road in London, named after Prince Albert, consort of Queen Victoria. It contains many educational and cultural sites.

It lies in the former village of Brompton in Middlesex, renamed as South Kensington, split between the Royal Borough of Kensington and Chelsea and the City of Westminster (the border running along Imperial College Road), and the area bordered by Cromwell Road to the south and Kensington Road to the north.

== Institutions ==
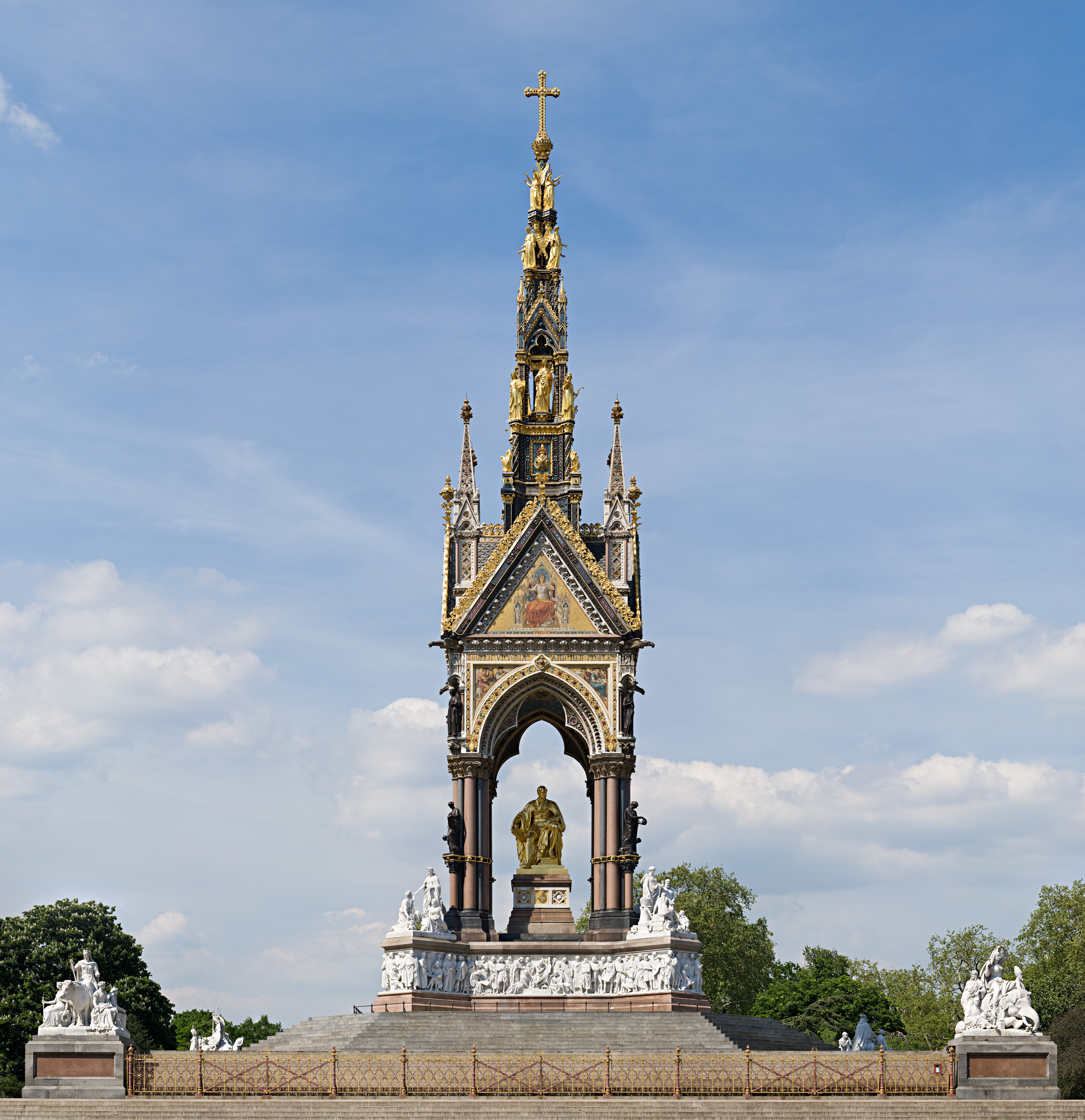
The Albert Memorial.

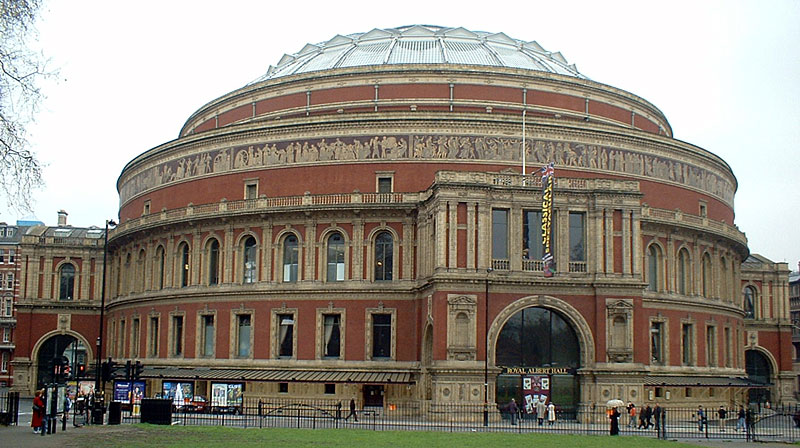
The Royal Albert Hall.

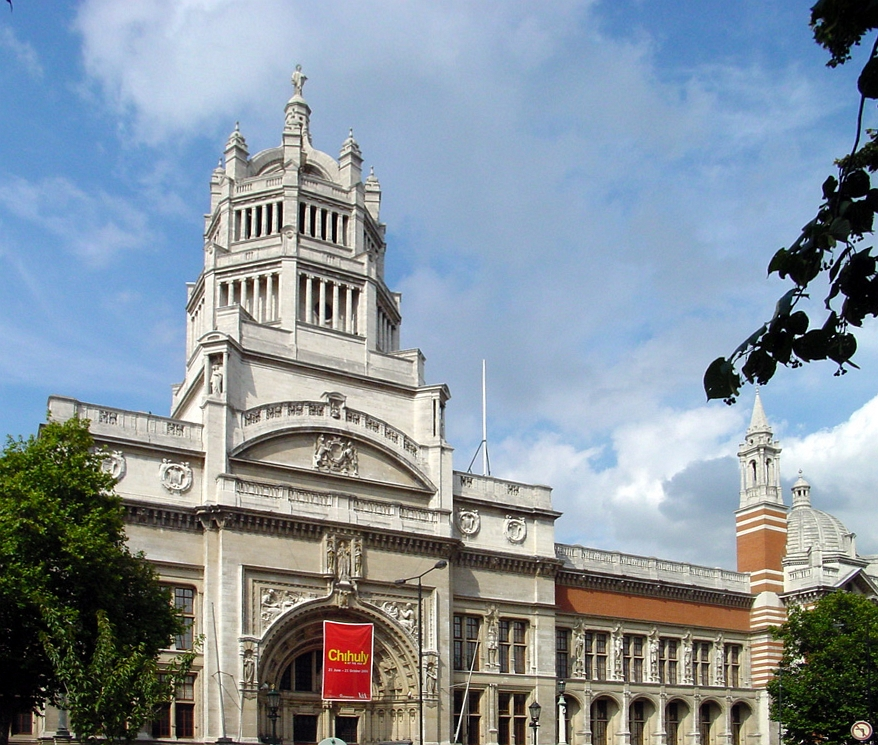
The Victoria and Albert Museum.

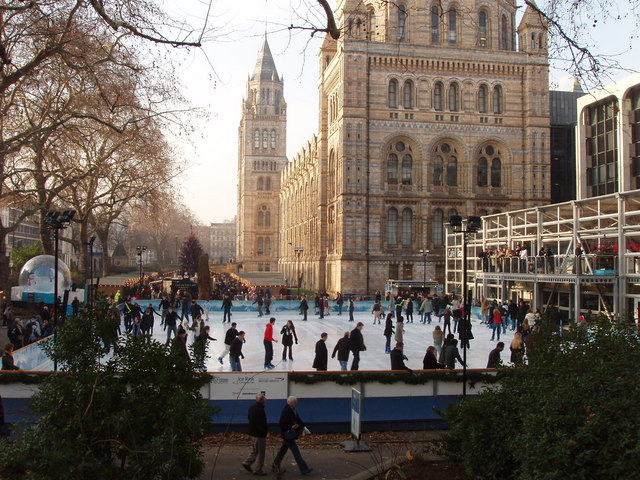
The Natural History Museum

Institutions in and around Albertopolis include:

- Imperial College London
- Natural History Museum
- Royal Albert Hall
- Royal College of Art
- Royal College of Music
- Royal Geographical Society
- Royal Institute of Navigation
- Science Museum
- Victoria and Albert Museum
- Albert Memorial

The following were originally institutions in their own right:

- City & Guilds College, now Imperial College's Faculty of Engineering
- Geological Museum, now a subsidiary of the Natural History Museum
- Royal College of Science, now Imperial College's Faculty of Natural Sciences
- Royal School of Mines, now a part of Imperial College's Faculty of Engineering

Institutions formerly in Albertopolis include:

- Royal College of Organists, from 1904 to 1991.
- Royal School of Naval Architecture, from 1864 to 1873.
- Royal School of Needlework, from 1903 to 1987.
- Imperial Institute, later Commonwealth Institute, from 1893 to 1962.

More recent additions to Albertopolis include:

- Polish Hearth Club from 1939
- Polish Institute and Sikorski Museum from 1945
- Ismaili Centre

== History ==
Following the advice of Prince Albert the area was purchased by the Royal Commission for the Exhibition of 1851 with the profits made from the Great Exhibition of 1851, which was held in a site in Hyde Park nearby to the north-east. This is commemorated in the name of the principal north–south street laid out on their estate, Exhibition Road.

Prince Albert was a driving force behind the Great Exhibition and President of the Royal Commission. The name "Albertopolis" seems to have been coined in the 1850s to celebrate and somewhat satirise his role in Victorian cultural life. After his death the term fell into disuse, and the area was more widely referred to as South Kensington.

The name was revived by architectural historians in the 1960s and popularised by the nascent conservation movement to bring attention to the complex of public Victorian buildings and the surrounding houses built on the Commissioners' estate, that were threatened with demolition by the expansion and redevelopment plans of Imperial College. Among the buildings threatened was the Imperial Institute, designed by T. E. Collcutt.

== Overview ==
There is a central axis between the Albert Memorial in Kensington Gardens to the north and the central portal of the south façade of the Natural History Museum. The Royal Albert Hall, Royal College of Music, the former tower of the otherwise-demolished Imperial Institute (now the Queen's Tower of Imperial College London) and the 1950s rear extension to the Science Museum are all aligned on this axis, which cannot be seen on the ground.

This regular geometric alignment of Albertopolis can be observed readily only from the balconies of the Queen's Tower, very rarely open to visitors. The northern part can be glimpsed from the top floor of the Science Museum.

The closest tube station is South Kensington, linked to the museums by the South Kensington Subway.

In May 1885, the District Railway opened South Kensington Subway, a pedestrian subway (a tiled tunnel), running from the station beneath the length of Exhibition Road, giving sheltered access to the newly built museums for a toll of 1 penny. The subway was originally intended to go as far as the Royal Albert Hall, but the construction of the Imperial Institute meant the tunnel emerged at the Science Museum where it exits onto Exhibition Road. It cost £42,614 to construct, approximately £4.73 million today. It was closed in November 1886 and afterwards was opened only occasionally for special museum events.

Originally only opened during exhibitions in South Kensington, it was opened to the public free of charge in 1908. The subway is Grade II listed.

There are three research libraries in the area, the National Art Library, in the Victoria and Albert Museum, Dana Centre, part of the Science Museum, and Imperial College's Abdus Salam Library, located on Queen's Lawn.

== See also ==
- Charles Wentworth Dilke
- Exhibition Road
- Henry Cole
- Museum Lane
- Serpentine Gallery in Hyde Park to the north
