= Abdus Salam Library =

Academic and research library at Imperial College London

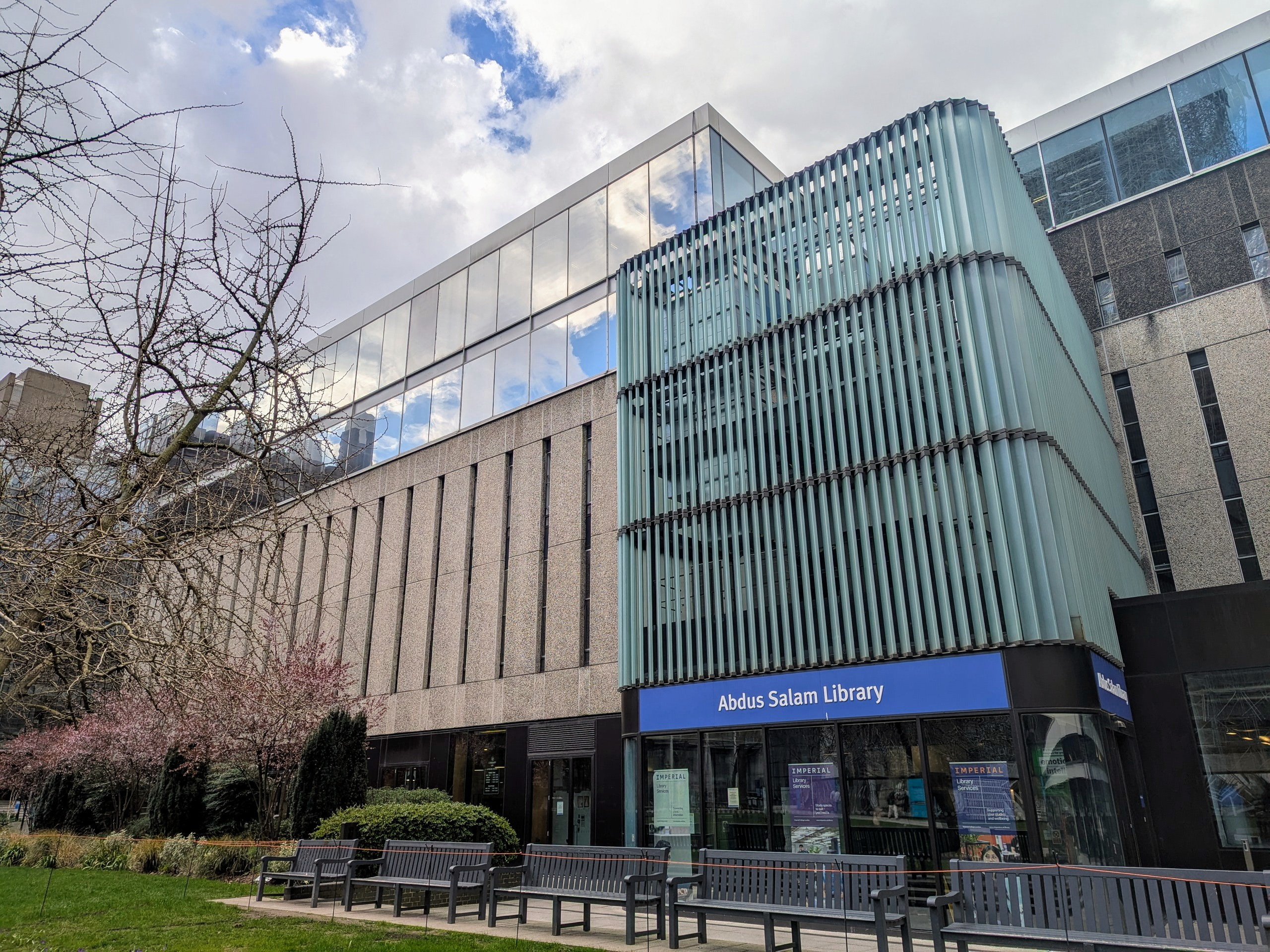
- Main entrance of Abdus Salam Library overlooking Queen's Lawn
- 51°29′54″N 0°10′42″W
- Location: Queen's Lawn, London, England
- Type: Academic library
- Scope: Specialises in science, technology and medicine
- Established: 1959 (current building 1969)

Collection
- Items collected: books; journals; newspapers; maps; technical reports; theses

Access and use
- Population served: Imperial College London (and limited other groups on application)

Other information
- Director: Kate Price
- Affiliation: Imperial College London
- Website: www.imperial.ac.uk/library/

The Abdus Salam Library is the largest academic and research library of Imperial College London. The current library opened in August 1969, taking over from the original Lyon Playfair Library which opened in 1959. The collection grew out of earlier libraries of the various departments and colleges; the oldest dates back to 1845. Formerly known as the Central Library, it is one of 7 libraries at Imperial with its collection covering all of the university's research departments. It is situated on Queen's Lawn next to Imperial College Road, and across from Queen's Tower.

== History ==
The earliest library collection associated with the Imperial was that of the Royal College of Chemistry, which opened in 1845. The collection was open not only to students, but also benefactors of the college, as a way of attracting funding and backing. The college went on to form part of the Royal School of Mines and then the Normal School of Science, with each having their own libraries, often part of larger museum collections. A central library at Imperial College Lonson dates back to the construction of the Royal College of Science's building after the formation of Imperial in 1907, part of which became home to the Science Museum library. Although this was not part of the college, it was used extensively by members of the college, acting as a reference library for items departmental collections did not cover.

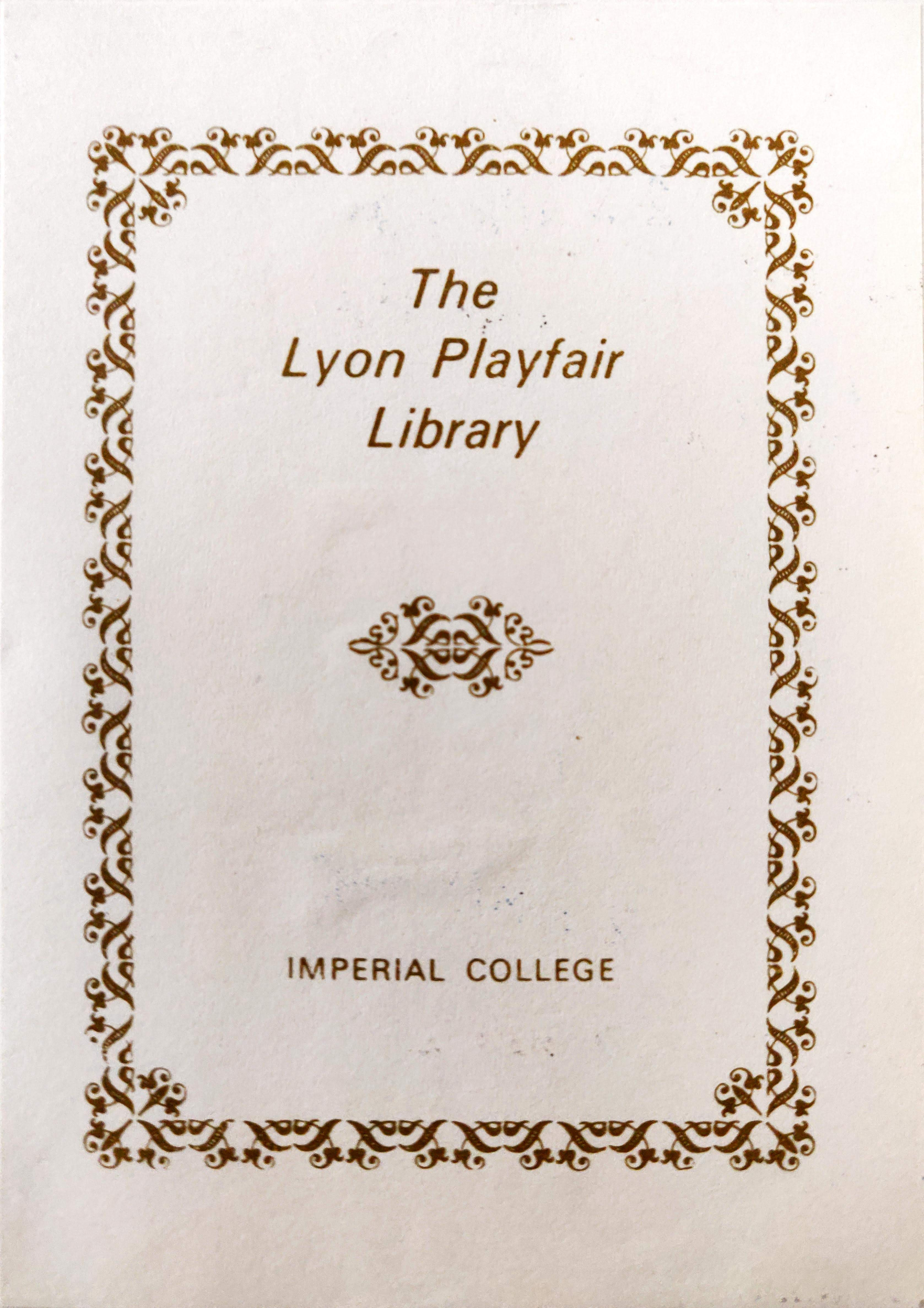
Bookplate from the Lyon Playfair Library

For most of the early 20th century the college's collection was spread out over the various constituent colleges and departments. The City and Guilds College building was home to a technical collection, with the Royal College of Science building containing a chemical reference library. Early on some professors, including Harold Maxwell-Lefroy, let students access their private collections due to the lack of extensive provisions at the college, however, in time the departmental libraries grew with donations of books from their leading academics, whose name they generally took, including the Egerton-Hinchley library at the Department of Chemical Engineering and the Department of Geology's Watts Library, the latter of which had by 1934 a collection of nearly 7000 books. Books left by students in Beit Hall were collected into a circulation library of around 400 items for personal non-academic recreational reading in the Union Building; this became known as the Haldane Library, named after Richard Haldane, who had been involved in the formation of the college. It eventually moved out of the Union to a larger college facility, growing to 4500 volumes by the mid-1950s. The college also had access to the University of London's library at Senate House for further material.

In 1959 the first central library at Imperial was opened, known as the Lyon Playfair Library, at 180 Queen's Gate. It was named after Lord Playfair of St Andrews, who had been a professor of chemistry at the Royal School of Mines. The initial collection was focused on engineering, as it was formed out of the Unwin Library, created through the amalgamation of many of the engineering department libraries. Although for the time being most science departments retained their own collections, the library expanded swiftly to cover the rest of the college's activities. In the 1960s Imperial quickly expanded in both facilities and population as part of an expansive programme of government investment. This resulted in the construction of new purpose built facility for the central library, which was completed in 1969 along with the adjoining College Block, today the Sherfield Building, with the Science Museum Library moving to the new building the same year. It was originally proposed for the Science Museum Library to be fully subsumed by the college's, however this plan was dropped by 1971.

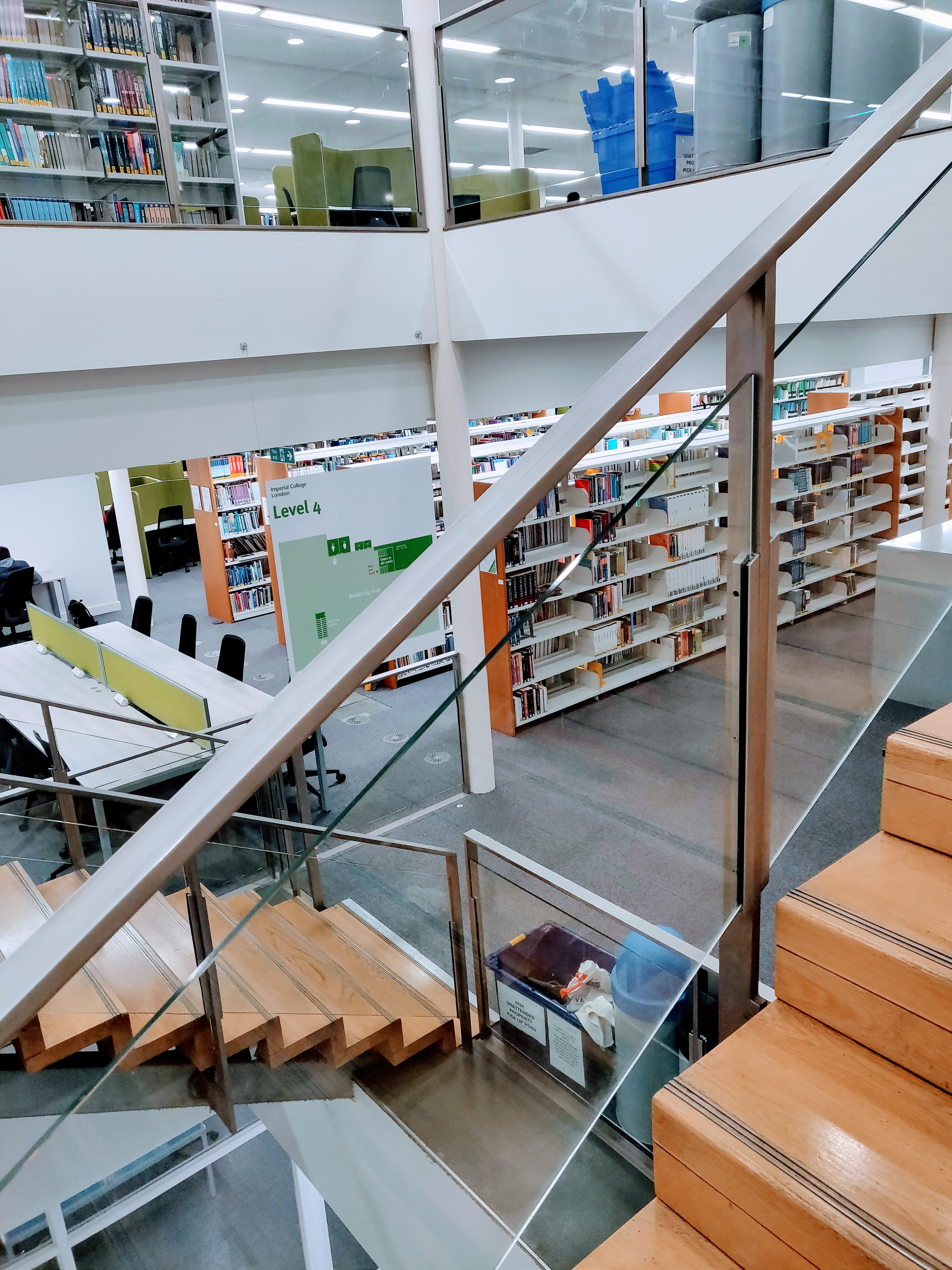
Top floors and main stairs

In 1992 the college's and the Science Museum's collections were merged into a single library. Following a consultation with Foster and Partners in 1994, the library was renovated and a Waterstones bookstore opened as part of an expansion of the ground floor in 1997. Two additional modern glass-clad floors were added to the top of the building, with the extension designed by John McAslan + Partners. By the same year the Haldane collection, formed earlier from the amalgamation of the Haldane library in the Central Library, had over a collection of over 40 000 items.

The Science Museum Library finally closed in 2014, with resources being moved to the Dana Centre on Queen's Gate and off-site archives. From 2017 through to end of summer 2018 the library underwent significant renovations, including the introduction of air conditioning, at a cost of £11 million.

In 2023, the Central Library was renamed after Nobel laureate Mohammad Abdus Salam, who founded Imperial's theoretical physics department.

== Building ==
The Abdus Salam Library building was opened in 1969 with the rest of what is today known as the Sherfield Building, and extensively uses exposed concrete surface as was common with British architecture at the time. The top two floors are more modern, with an open-plan interior and glass exterior walls, being built in 1997. The library contains training facilities, groups study areas, and an IT cluster and service desk. The Library Café is on the ground floor, next to the main entrance.

== Access ==
The library primarily serves students and researchers at Imperial, with the library open 24 hours a day all week, excluding Friday night.
