= Department of Chemistry, Imperial College London =

University department

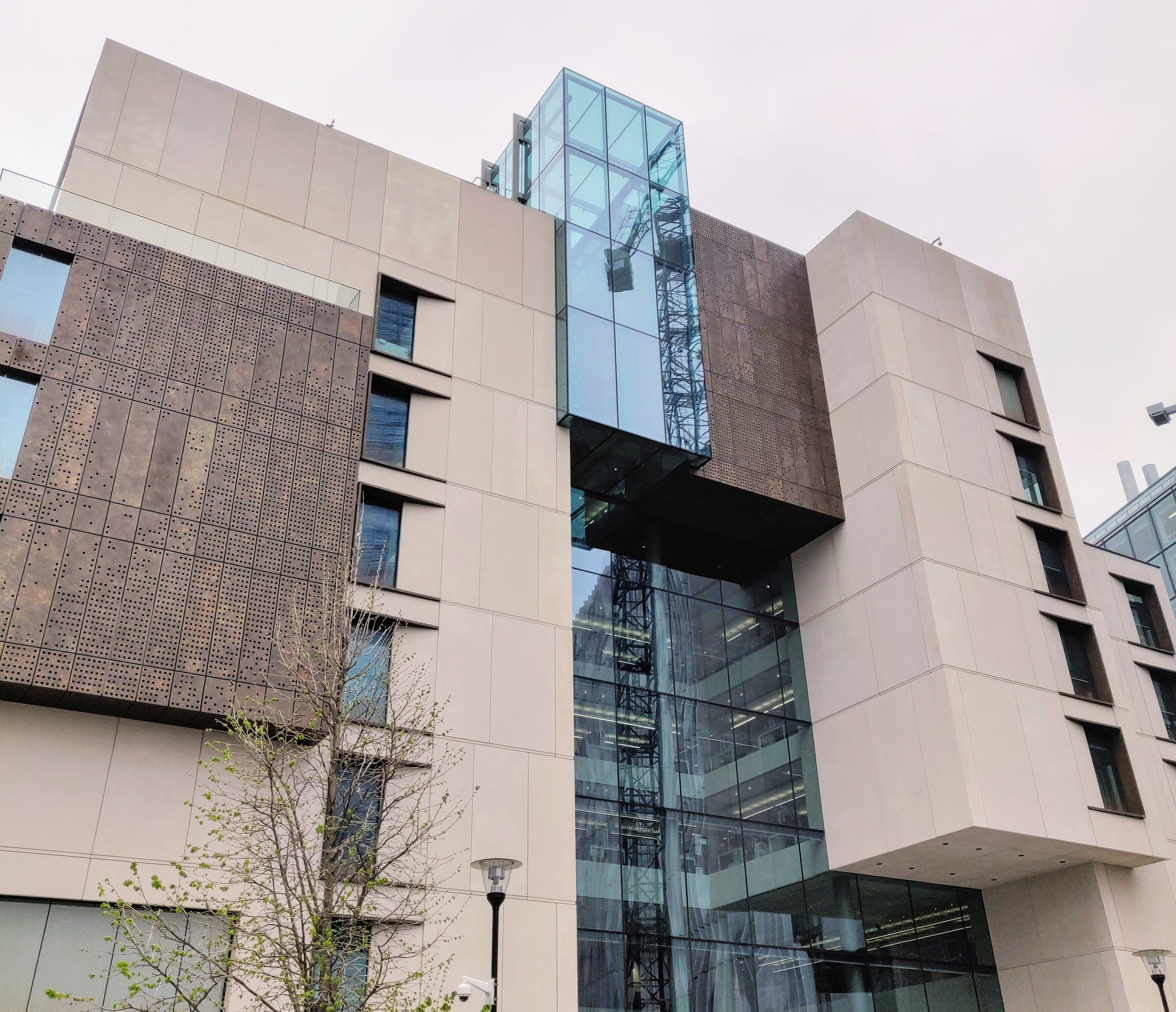
- Molecular Sciences Research Hub, White City
- Former name: Royal College of Chemistry
- Established: 1845; 181 years ago
- Head of Department: Professor Oscar Ces
- Faculty: Imperial College Faculty of Natural Sciences
- Staff: 46
- Students: 861
- Location: Imperial College Road, London, United Kingdom; 51.497708°N 0.177475°W
- Campus: South Kensington; White City (research)
- Website: www.imperial.ac.uk/chemistry
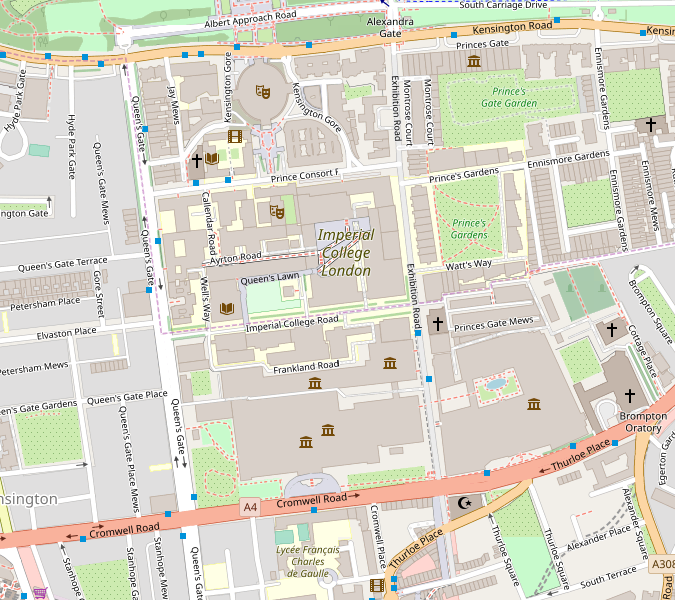
- Location within Albertopolis, South Kensington

The Department of Chemistry is responsible for teaching and research in chemistry at Imperial College London.

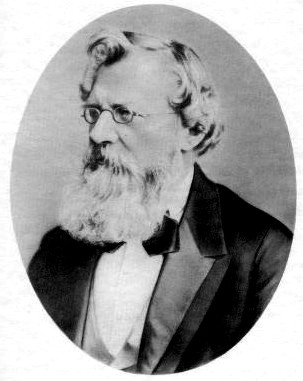
August Wilhelm von Hofmann was the first professor at the Royal College of Chemistry.

== Structure ==
The department comprises approximately 60 academic staff, 14 teaching fellows, 95 postdoctoral research scientists and research fellows, and around 1,210 students, including approximately 230 PhD students, 150 MRes students, and roughly 830 undergraduate students, as of the 2023–2024 academic year. More than 45 administrative and support staff also work in the department. The department operates across two sites: one in South Kensington (in the London Borough of Kensington and Chelsea) and another in White City (part of the London Borough of Hammersmith and Fulham).

The first site is the Chemistry Building located on Imperial College Road, overlooking Dangoor Plaza and the Queen’s Lawn at the South Kensington Campus. The second site is the Molecular Sciences Research Hub (MSRH), a £170 million facility for chemistry on the White City Campus, which sits in the White City Innovation District. The Molecular Sciences Research Hub houses all research in the Department of Chemistry, where undergraduate students complete their final‑year research projects.

== Rankings ==
- In the 2024 QS World University Rankings by Subject, the department was ranked 11th globally, 4th in Europe, and 3rd in the UK.
- The 2021 Research Excellence Framework (REF) results saw the department ranked 3rd overall in the UK based on the proportion of research rated 4*, and it was one of four departments to score 100% 4* in the UK for research environment (joint 1st).
- The EDI environment was recognised through renewal of its Athena SWAN Gold award (2019), one of only two in Chemistry in the UK.
- All undergraduate courses are accredited by the Royal Society of Chemistry.
- The department was ranked 4th in the UK by the Times Good University Guide in 2024 and 5th by the Complete University Guide.
- The department was ranked 3rd in the UK and 6th in Europe according to the Academic Ranking of World Universities.

== Research infrastructure ==
The Molecular Sciences Research Hub is a 24,000 m^{2} research facility providing infrastructure for chemistry research, with a capacity for 80 groups and more than 800 researchers (including collaborating groups from other departments, encouraging connections between the chemical sciences and other disciplines). The MSRH, which spans nine floors, was built to high energy standards of energy efficiency, certified BREEAM Excellent, and awarded a 2019 S-Lab global laboratory design prize.

To support the growth of the White City Innovation District, the Department co‑established the Deep Tech Network in partnership with Upstream, a collaboration between Hammersmith and Fulham Council and Imperial College London. The Deep Tech Network runs a series of events and showcases that aim to foster links between stakeholders in White City.

== Teaching ==
=== Types of study ===
==== Undergraduate ====
The department offers three-year BSc and four-year undergraduate MSci courses. All students graduating with an undergraduate degree from the department are also awarded the Associateship of the Royal College of Science, ARCS.

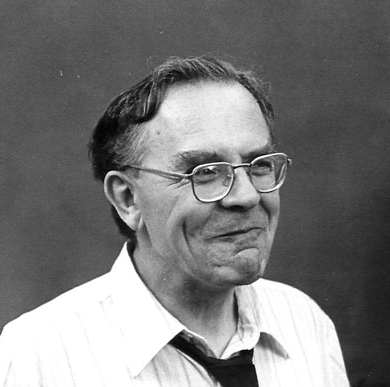
Nobel Laureate Sir Geoffrey Wilkinson completed his bachelor's and doctor's degrees at the department

== People ==
- August Wilhelm von Hofmann, first professor at the Royal College of Chemistry
- Martha Whiteley OBE, one of the inventors of mustard gas (also an alumna of the department)
- Sue Gibson OBE
- Anthony Gerard Martin Barrett FRS, FMedSci (also an alumnus of the department, BSc PhD)
- Lord George Porter OM PRS, 1967 Nobel Prize in Chemistry

== Alumni ==
- Frances Micklethwait MBE ARCS, first researcher into a cure for mustard gas
- Sir Derek Barton BSc ARCS PhD, 1969 Nobel Prize in Chemistry
- Sir Geoffrey Wilkinson BSc ARCS PhD, 1973 Nobel Prize in Chemistry
