= Imperial College Road =

Road in South Kensington, London

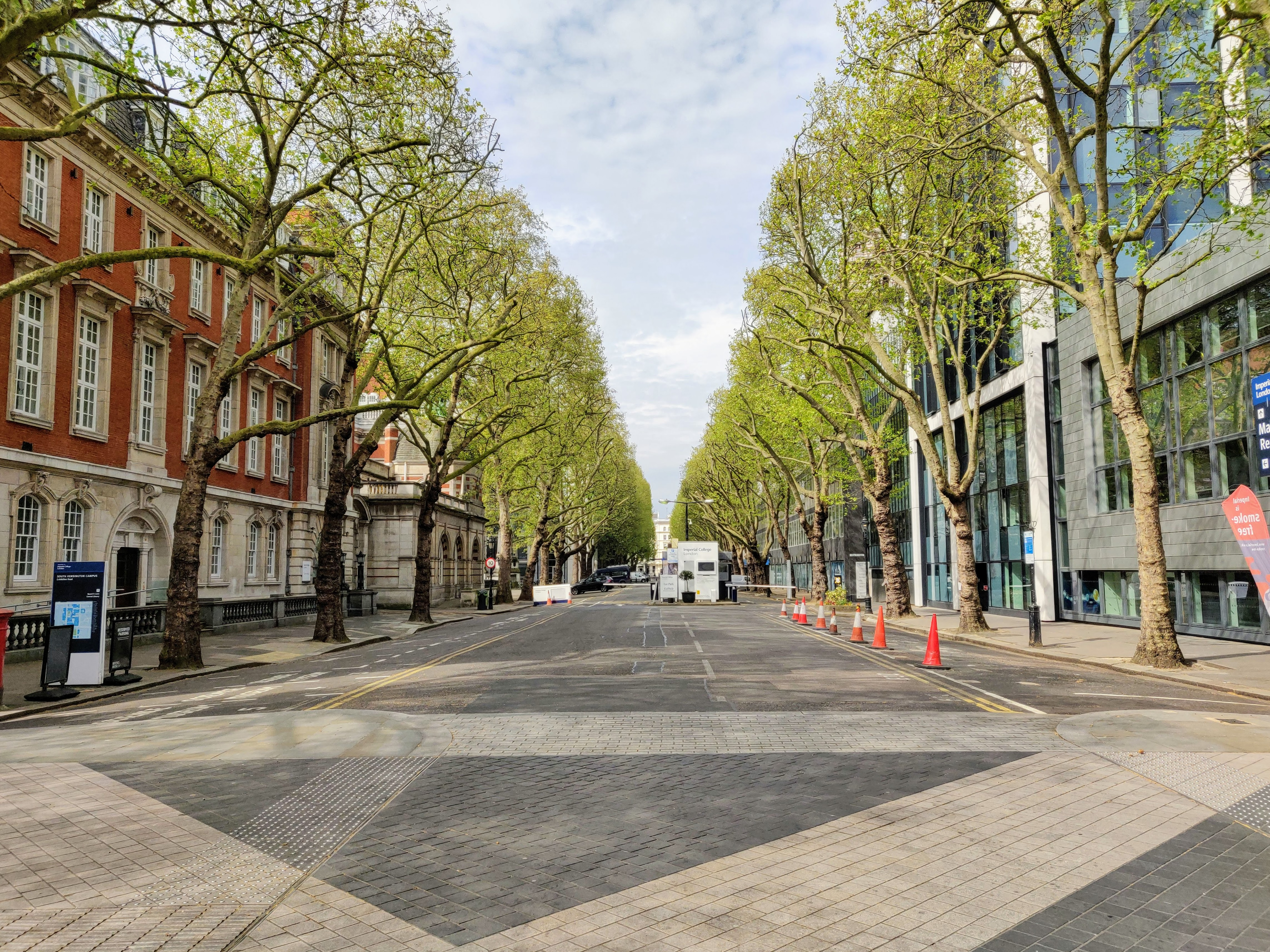
- Imperial College Road from Exhibition Road
- Former name(s): Imperial Institute Road
- Namesake: Imperial College London
- Location: Albertopolis, Westminster, London, United Kingdom
- Postal code: SW7
- Nearest Tube station: South Kensington (east end); Gloucester Road (west end)
- Coordinates: 51°29′53″N 0°10′36″W
- West end: Falmouth Gate, Queen's Gate
- East end: Exhibition Road

Other
- Known for: Queen's Tower, Imperial College London (historically Imperial Institute, Royal College of Science)

Imperial College Road is a tree-lined road in South Kensington, London, England. It runs east–west with Queen's Gate to the west and Exhibition Road to the east.

The road forms part of the boundary between Royal Borough of Kensington and Chelsea to the south and the City of Westminster to the north. It lies at the heart of the area known as Albertopolis, with a number of museums, cultural buildings and educational institutions in the area, a legacy of the Great Exhibition of 1851 held in Hyde Park to the north and promoted by Prince Albert, husband of Queen Victoria. Formerly known as Imperial Institute Road, the road now takes its name from Imperial College London, on whose campus it is located. The Queen's Tower (surrounded by the Queen's Lawn adjacent to Imperial College Road) dominates the view to the north halfway along the road, along with the college's main library. To the south are the Department of Chemistry of Imperial College, the Sir Alexander Fleming Building, and the Science Museum. Beyond these buildings is the Natural History Museum.

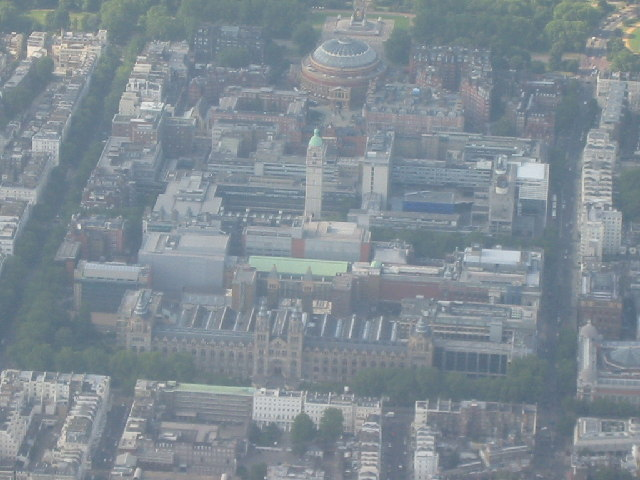
Aerial view from the south. Imperial College Road runs left–right in front of the Queen's Tower in the centre of the view

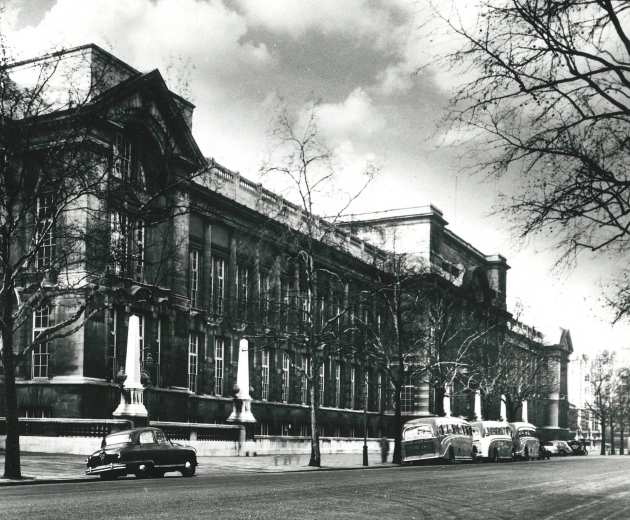
Royal College of Science on Imperial Institute Road

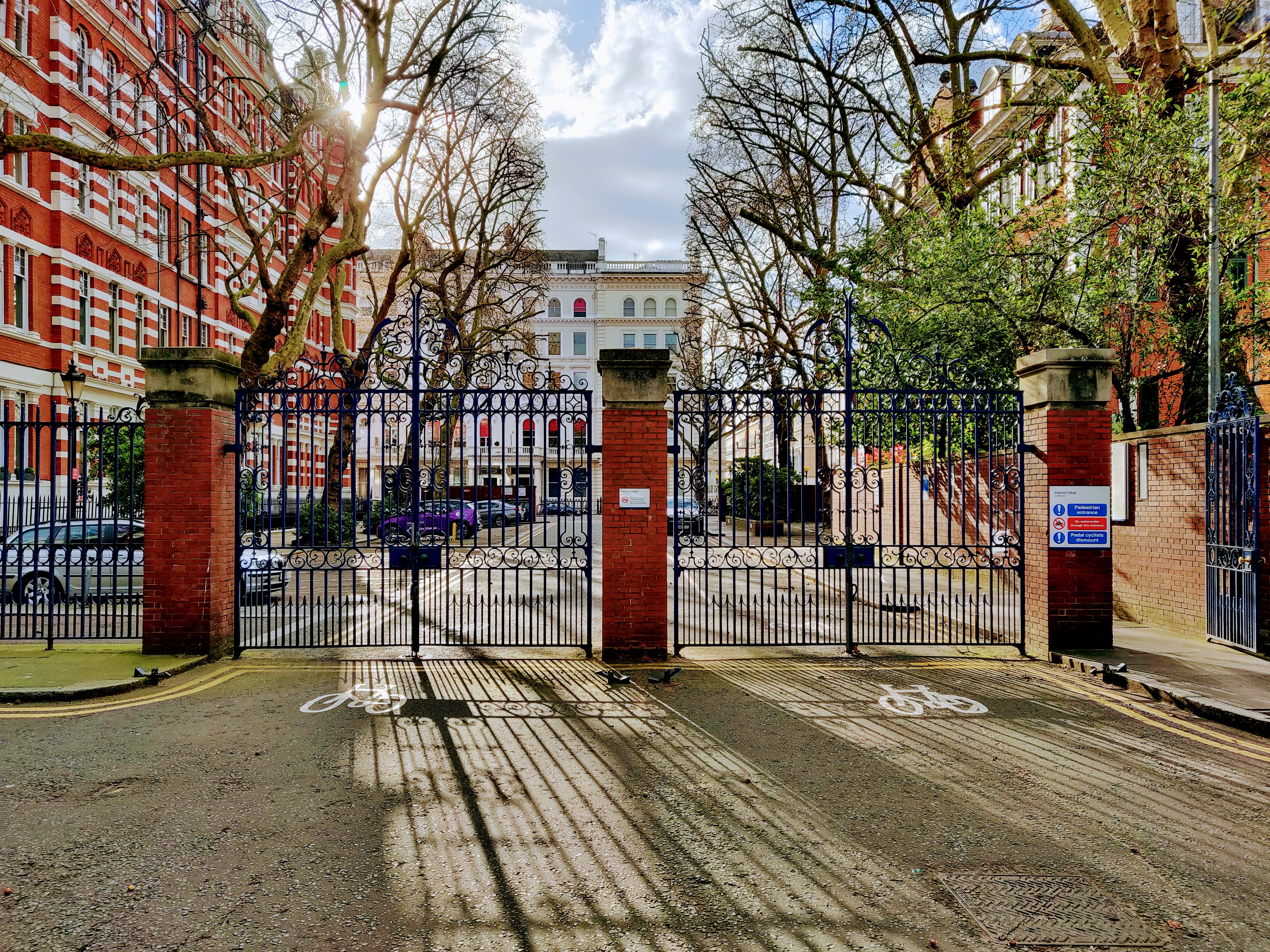
Falmouth Gate looking towards Queen's Gate

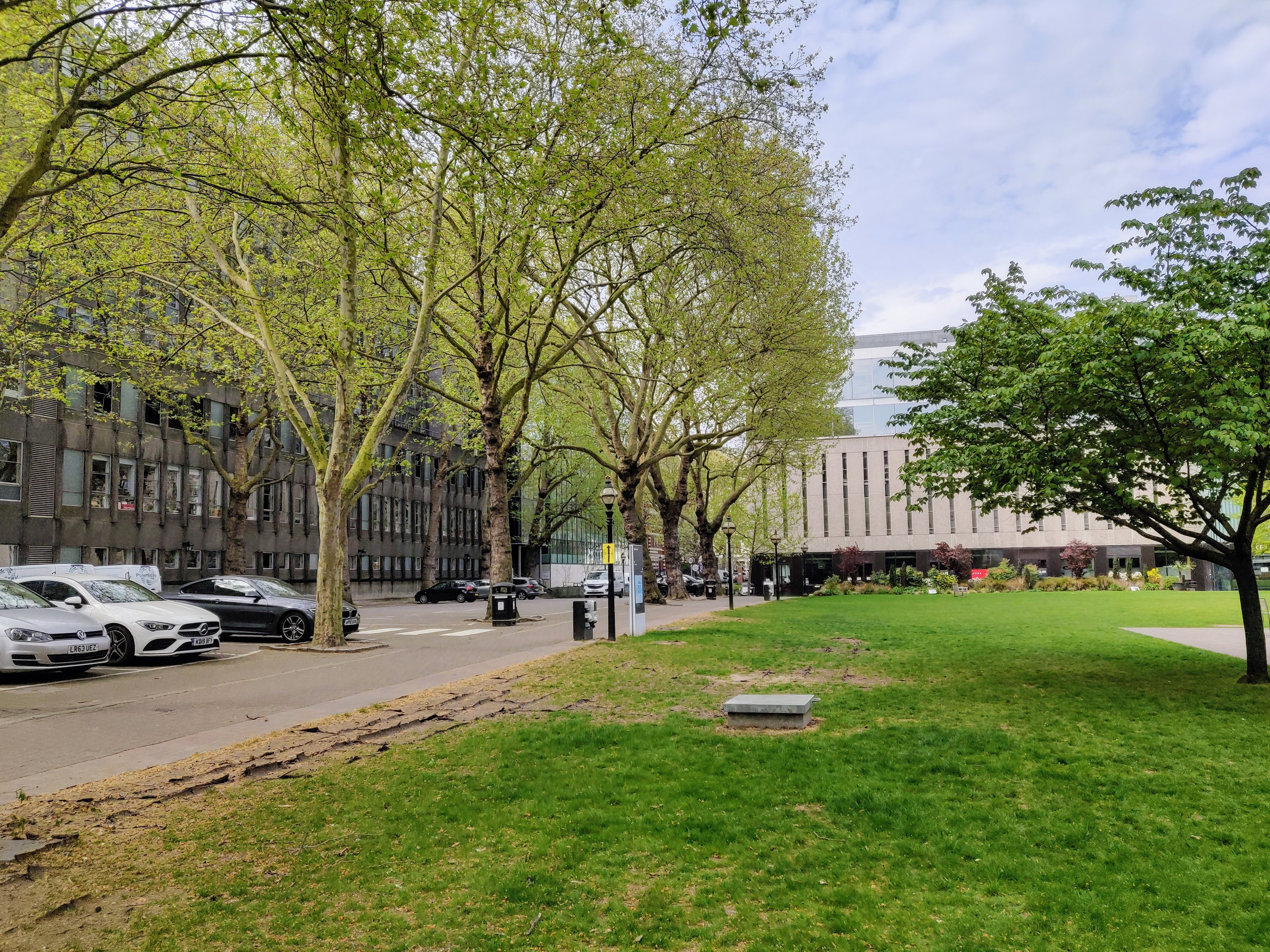
The road runs along Queen's Lawn

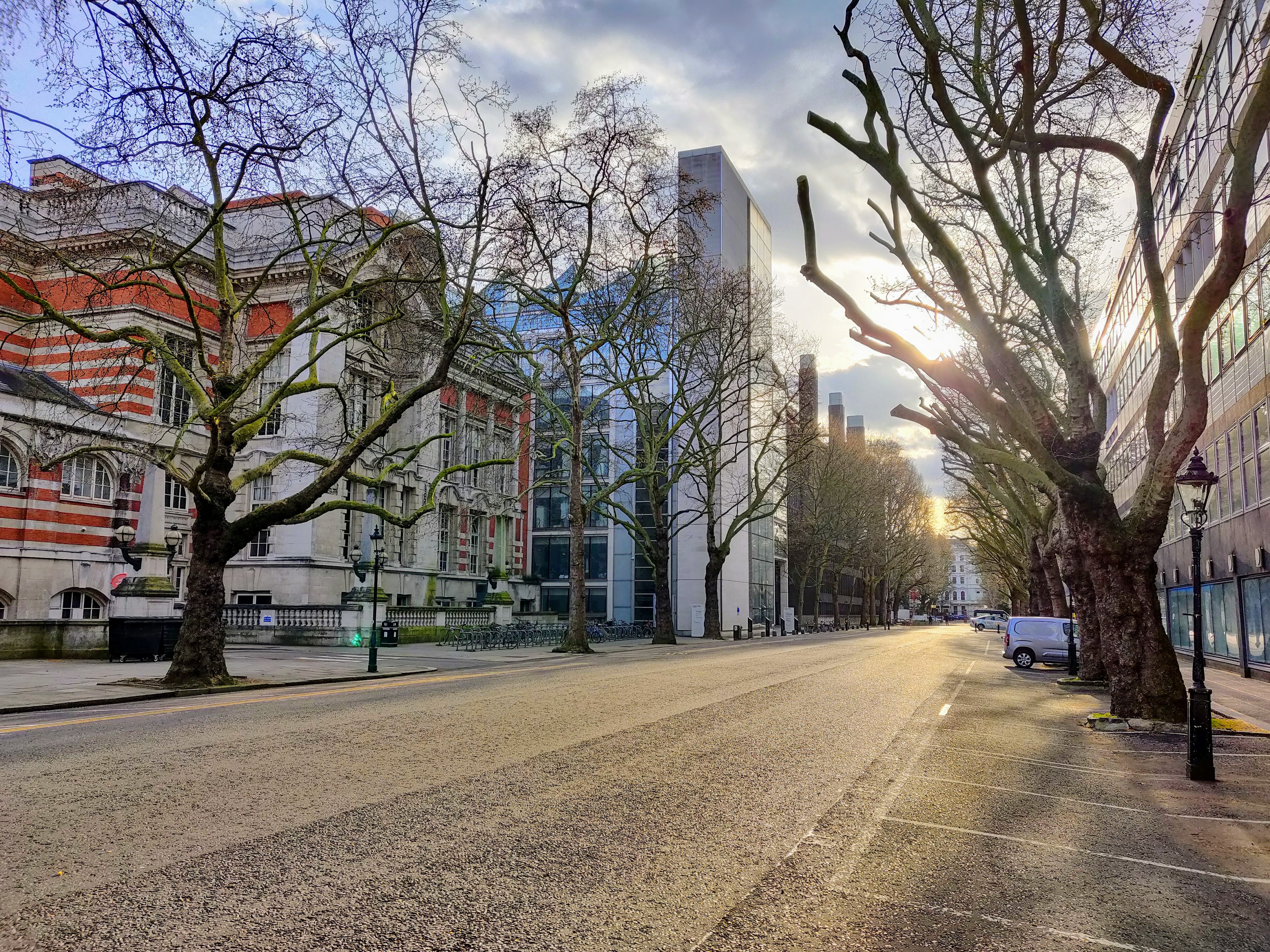
From the corner with Unwin Road looking west

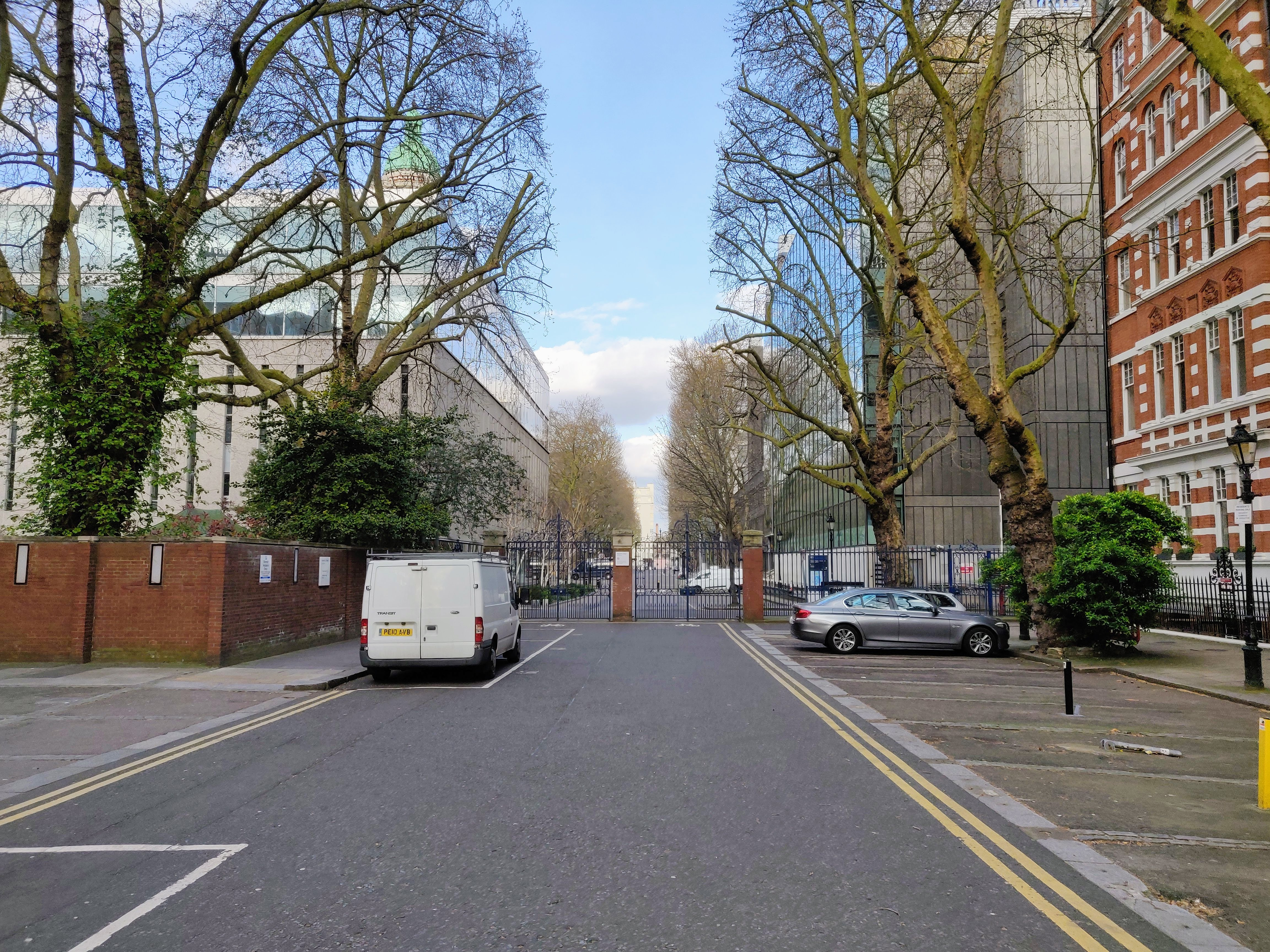
West end at Queen's Gate looking east

== See also ==
- Imperial College London
