= Queen's Lawn =

Green area situated at the centre of Imperial College London

Coordinates: 51.4983°N 0.1774°W

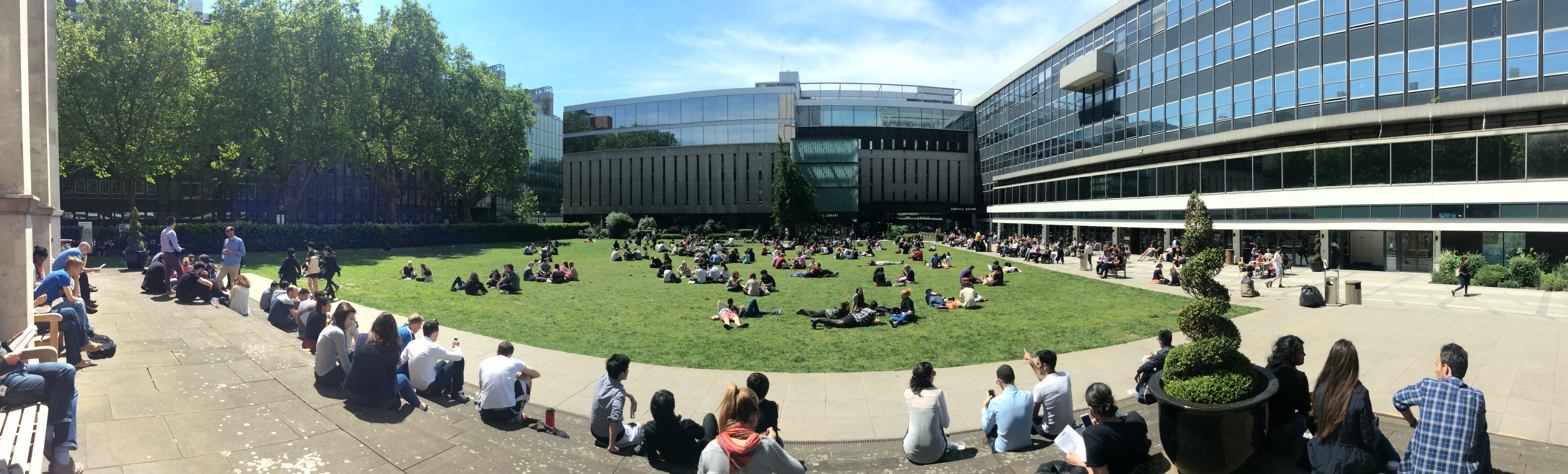
Panoramic view of the Queen's Lawn from the base of the Queen's Tower. The tree-lined Imperial College Road is on the left

The Queen's Lawn is a green lawned area situated at the centre of Imperial College London's South Kensington campus, next to the Queen's Tower and immediately to the north of Imperial College Road. It provides an open space of 1,600 sq metres, and is surrounded by the Abdus Salam Library, and the Sherfield administration, Chemistry, and Skempton buildings. It is often the site of college events, including student bands, fairs, and balls, as well as student activism.

In April 2006, the Imperial College student newspaper Felix reported that the college was seeking permission of Westminster City Council to develop part of the lawn into a three-storey modular building, however this has not come to pass. A weekly farmer's market is held on Tuesdays, and Queen's Lawn was also the site of a world record attempt for the largest jelly mosaic.

A diagonal path was built across the lawn in 2021.

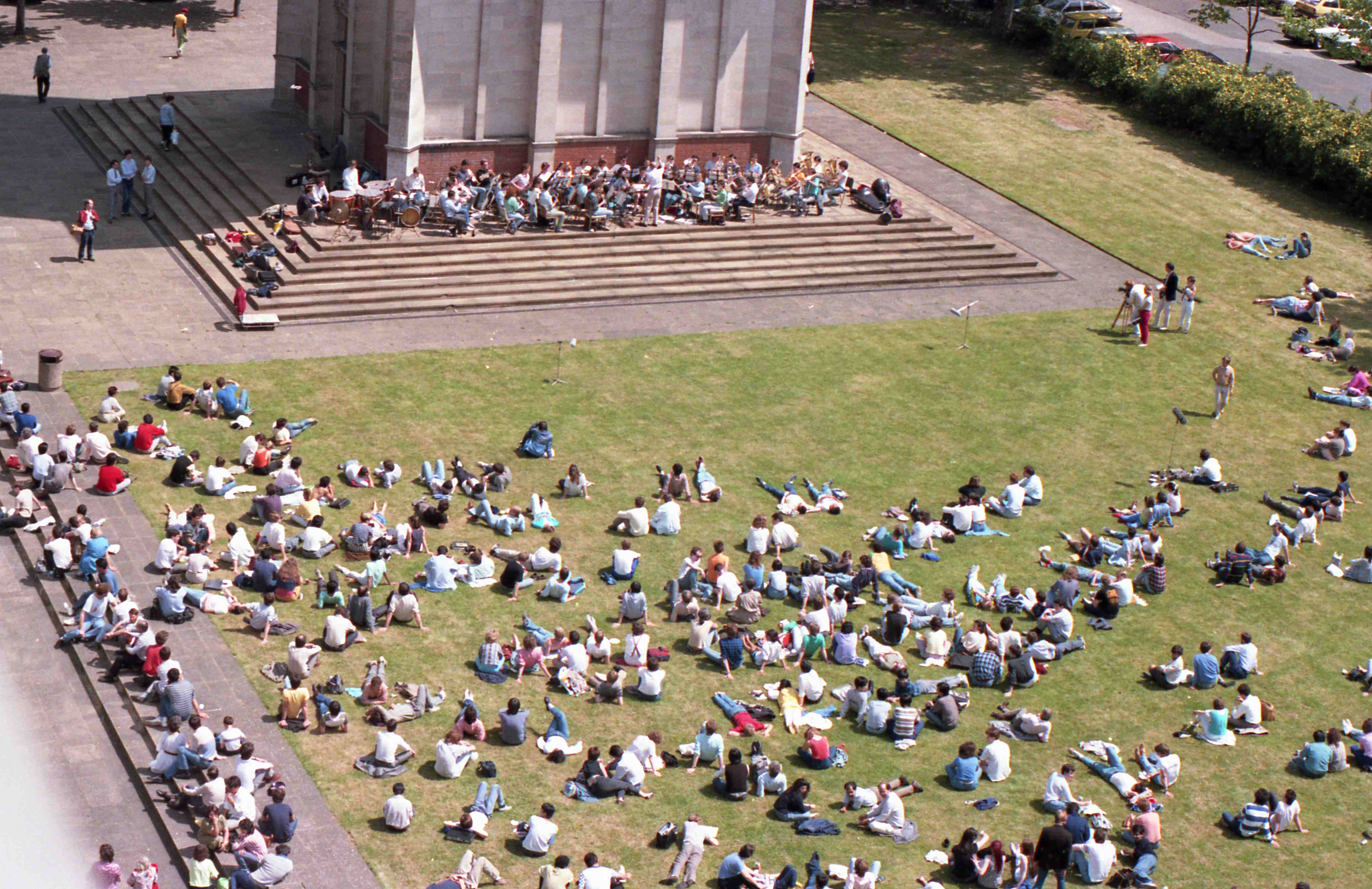
Tchaikovsky's 1812 Overture with bells and cannon fire, performed annually on the Queen's Lawn. The base of the Queen's Tower can be seen at the top of the picture

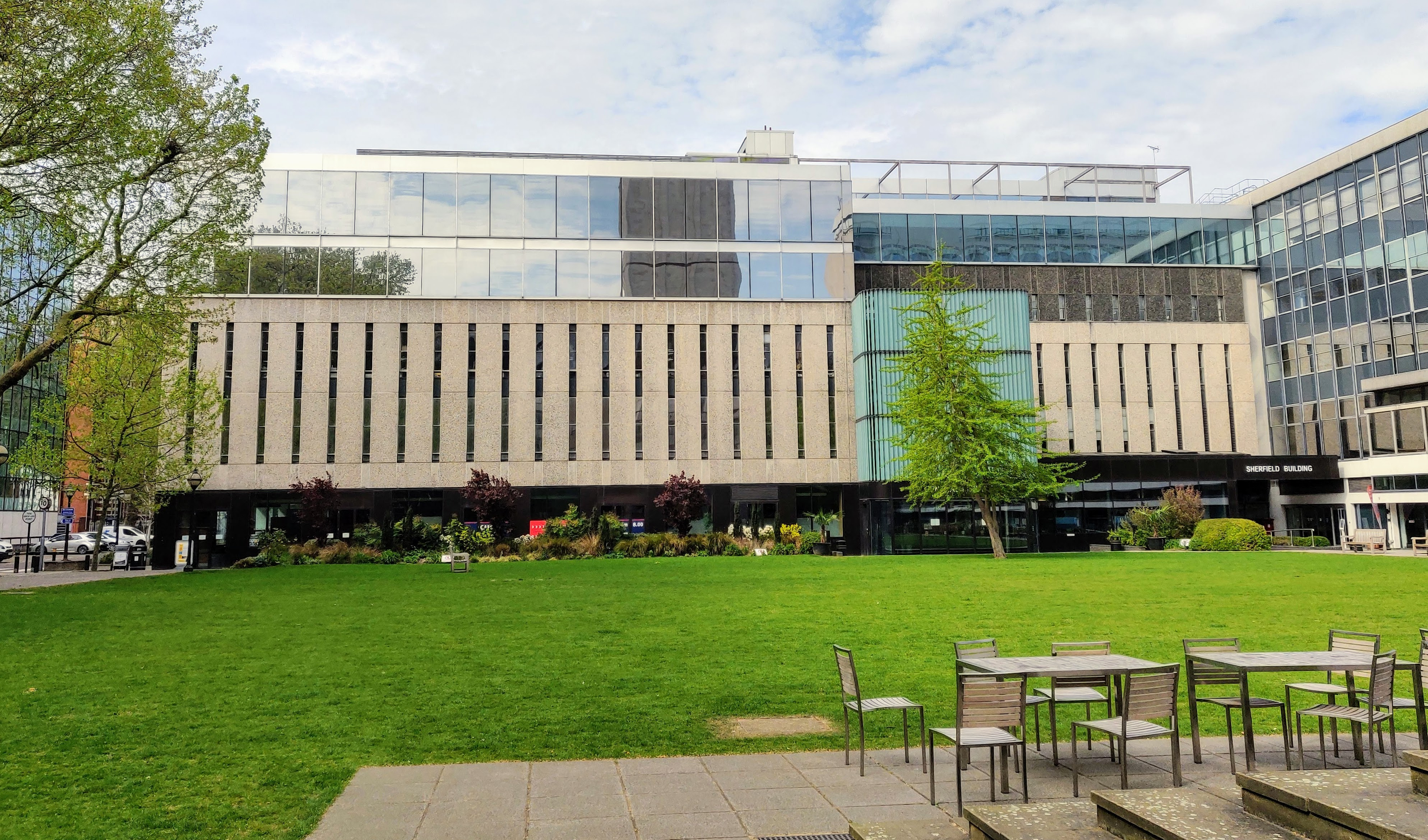
The Central Library, the college's main academic library, overlooks Queen's Lawn. The top two floors were built as part of a modern extension to the library

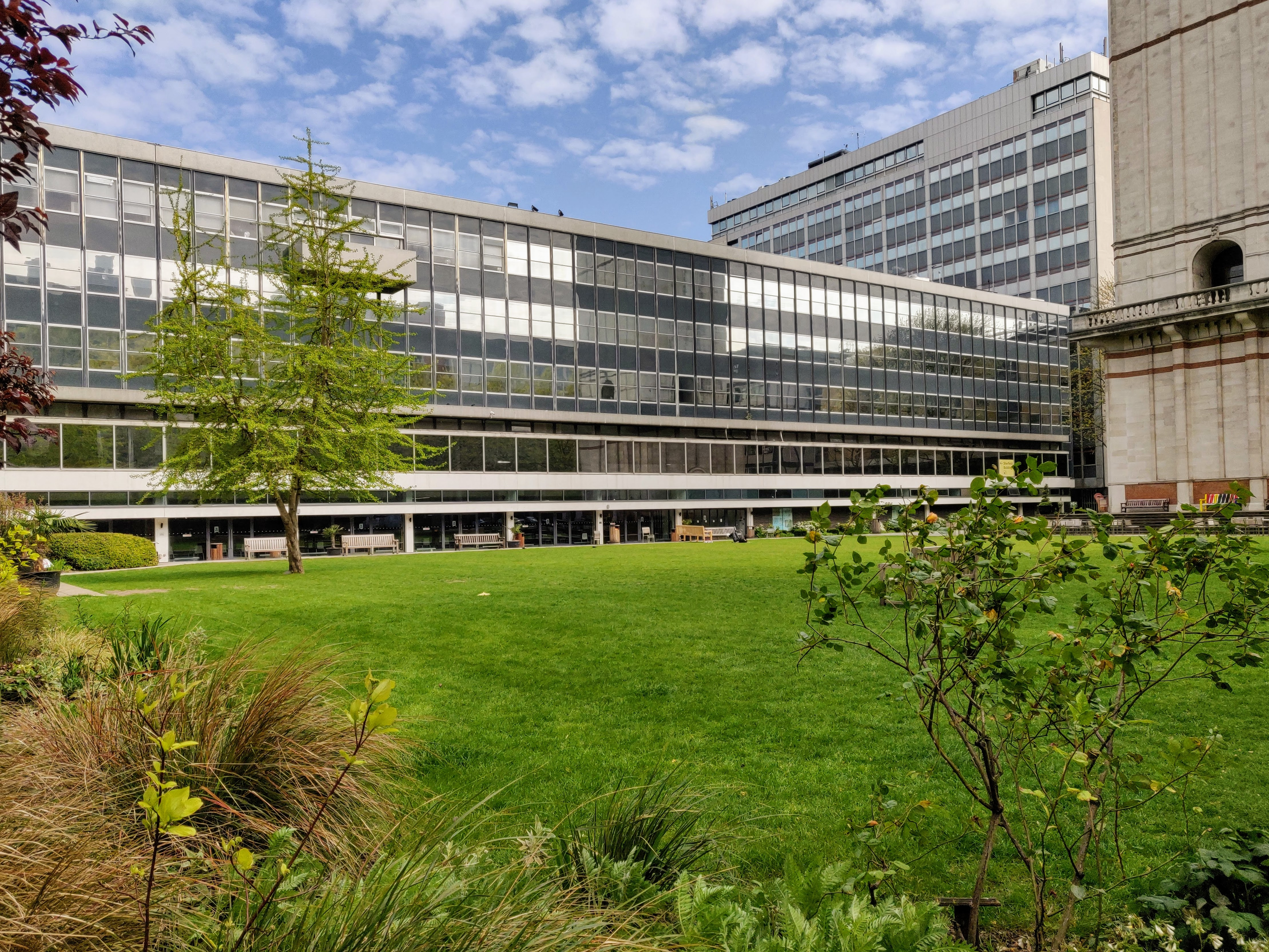
Sherfield Building, the central administrative building, from across the lawn. On the first floor are the junior and senior common rooms

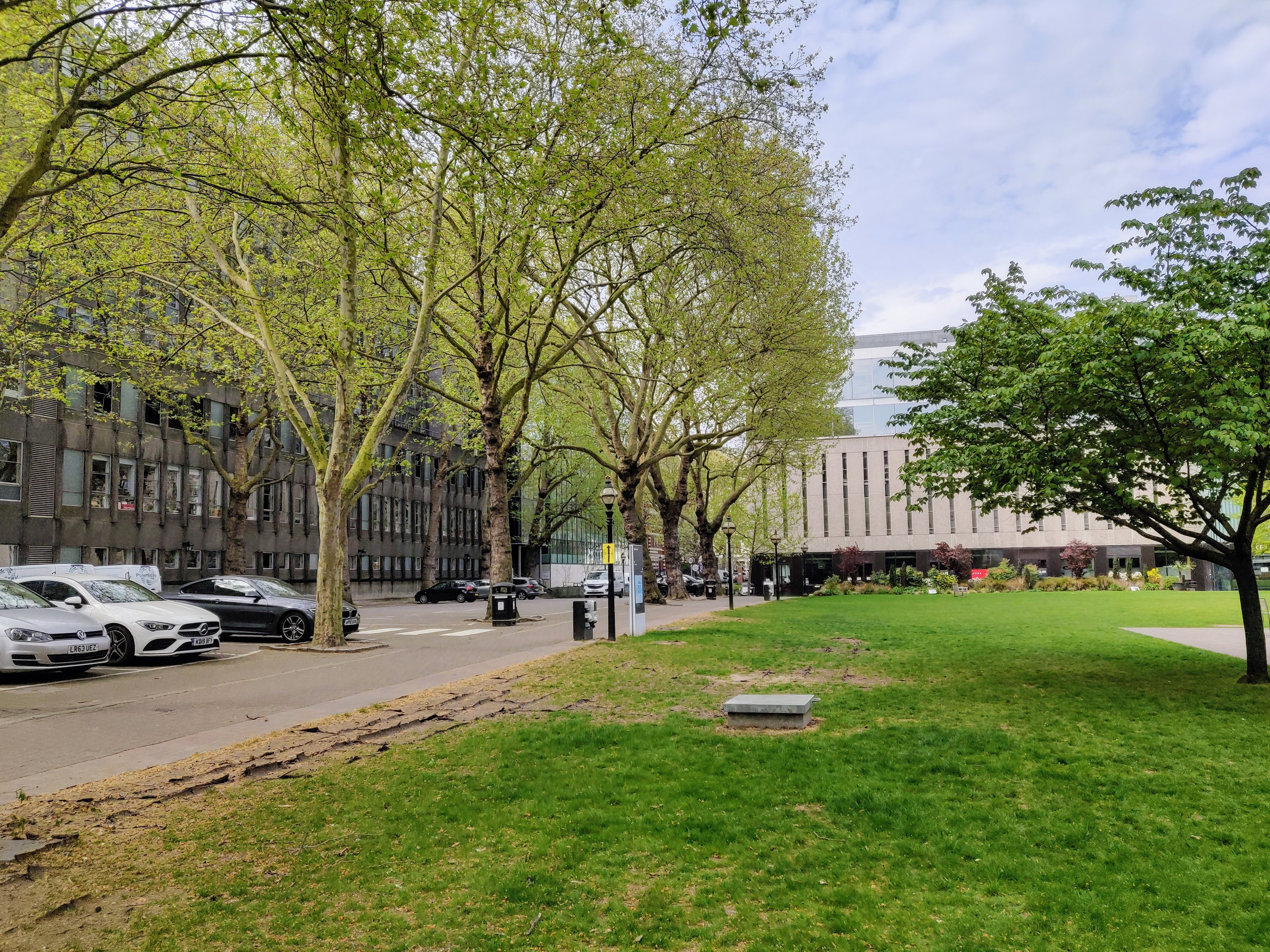
Imperial College Road runs along the south side of the lawn. The Chemistry Building is across the road
