= Exhibition Road =

Street in South Kensington, London, England

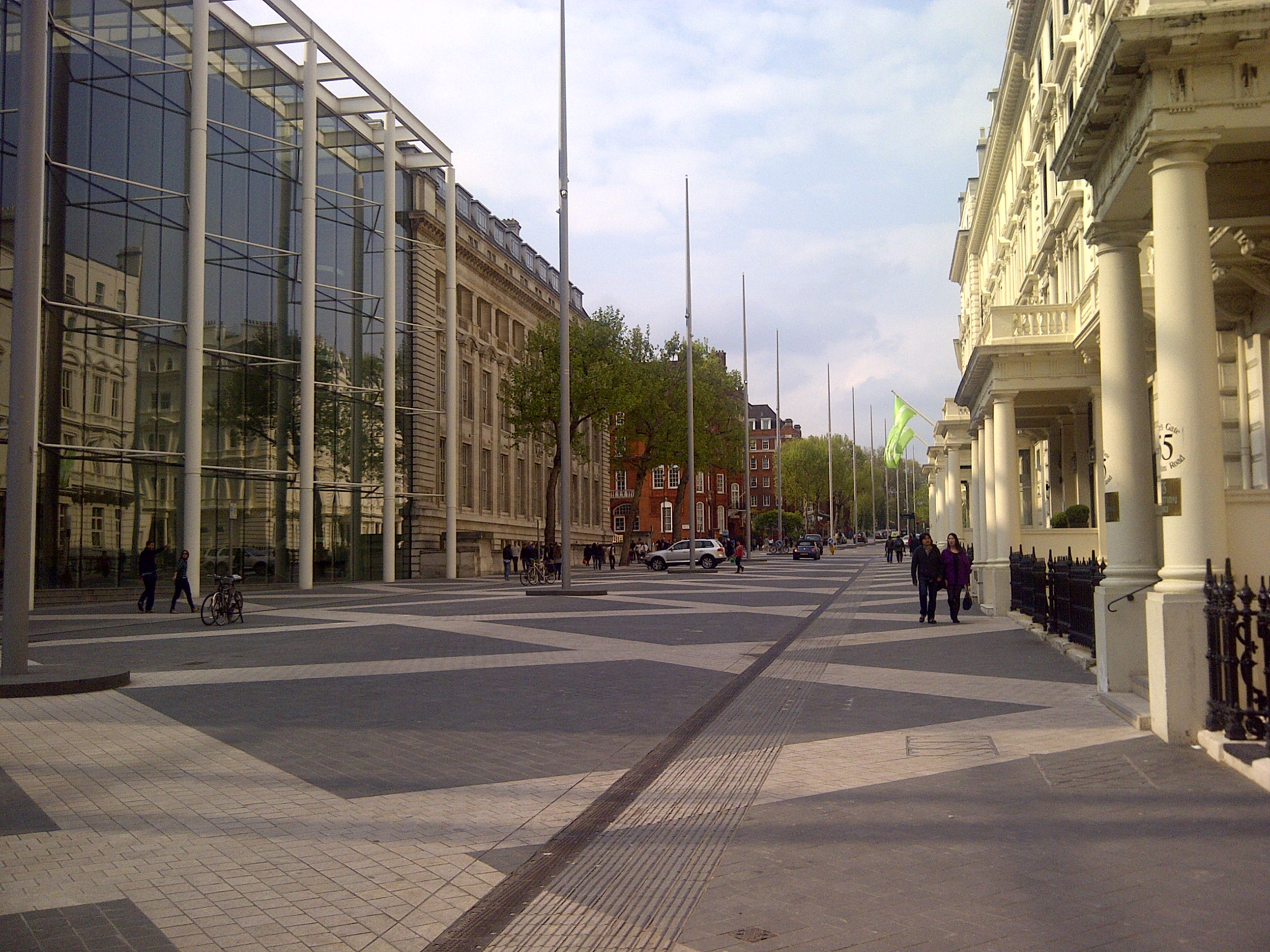
- Exhibition Road following opening of shared space scheme during 2012
- Interactive map of Exhibition Road
- Former name: Prince's Gate
- Namesake: The Great Exhibition
- Location: Albertopolis, Westminster, London, United Kingdom
- Postal code: SW7
- Nearest Tube station: South Kensington
- Coordinates: 51°29′56.3″N 0°10′27.3″W
- North end: Hyde Park (Alexandra Gate), Kensington Road
- Major junctions: Imperial College Road, Cromwell Road
- South end: Thurloe Street, South Kensington tube station

Other
- Known for: Imperial College London, Science Museum, V&A, Natural History Museum

Exhibition Road is a street in South Kensington, London which is home to several major museums and academic establishments, including the Victoria and Albert Museum, the Science Museum and the Natural History Museum.

== Overview ==
The road gets its name from the Great Exhibition of 1851, which was held just inside Hyde Park at the northern end of the road. After the central road in the area, Queen's Gate, it is the second thoroughfare in what was once Albertopolis.

It provides access to many nationally significant institutions, including:

- Victoria and Albert Museum
- Science Museum
- Natural History Museum (which incorporates the former Geological Museum)
- Royal Geographical Society, at the north end in Kensington Gore
- Polish Institute and Sikorski Museum, at the north end in Princes Gate
- Imperial College London (directly and via Imperial College Road)
- Pepperdine University Abroad
- Jagiellonian University London Study Centre in the Polish Hearth Club
- London Goethe Institute
- The Hyde Park Chapel of the Church of Jesus Christ of Latter-day Saints

== Shared space ==
A design competition for plans of how to improve the street's design to reflect its cultural importance was held in 2003 by the Royal Borough of Kensington and Chelsea. The competition was won by the architectural firm Dixon Jones for a shared space scheme for the road and surrounding streets which would give pedestrians greater priority whilst still allow some vehicular traffic at a reduced speed. The project also aimed to improve the artistic and architectural merit of the streetscape. The scheme was completed ahead of the 2012 London Olympics. Over the decade since the revised streetscape was completed, there has been one major incident involving a minibus and anecdotal reports criticising the design.

== Gallery ==
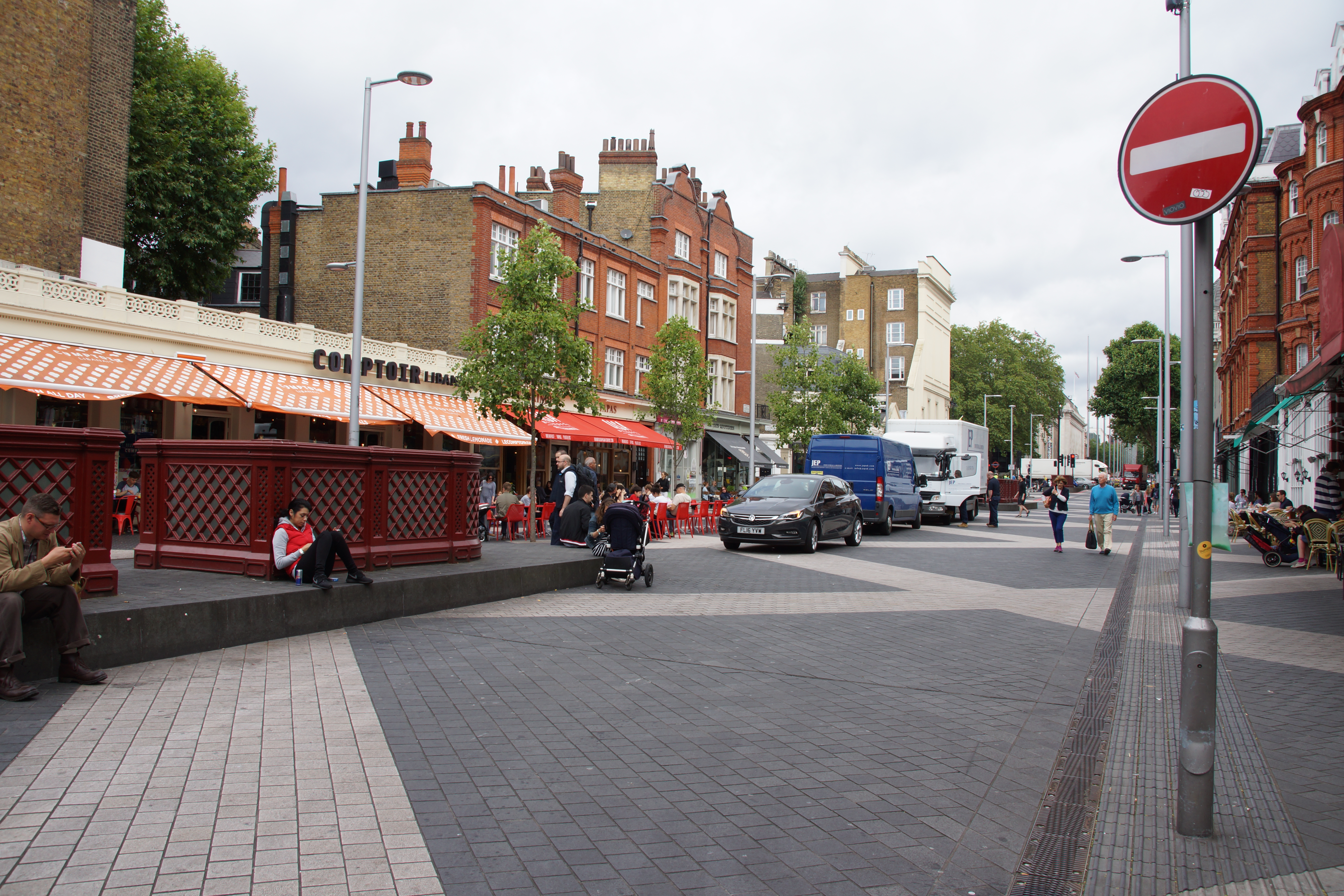
South of Thurloe Place near South Kensington tube station

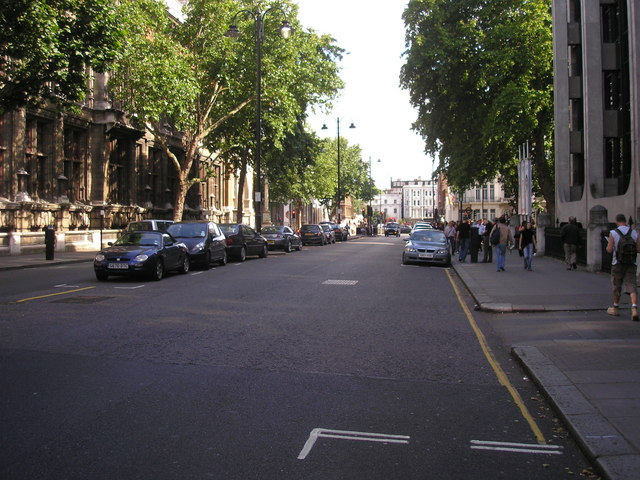
Looking south prior to the shared-space scheme

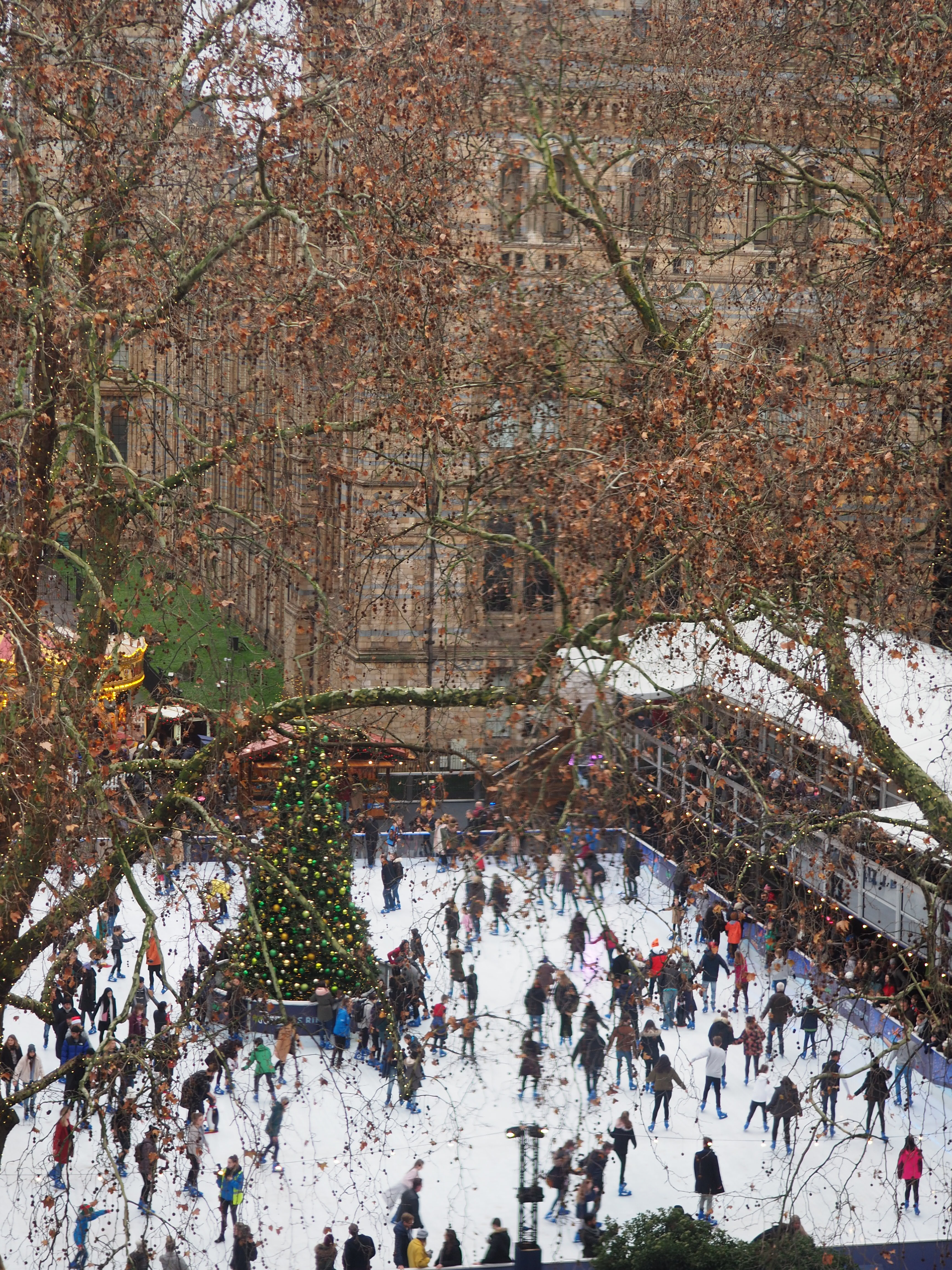
The Natural History Museum and winter ice rink

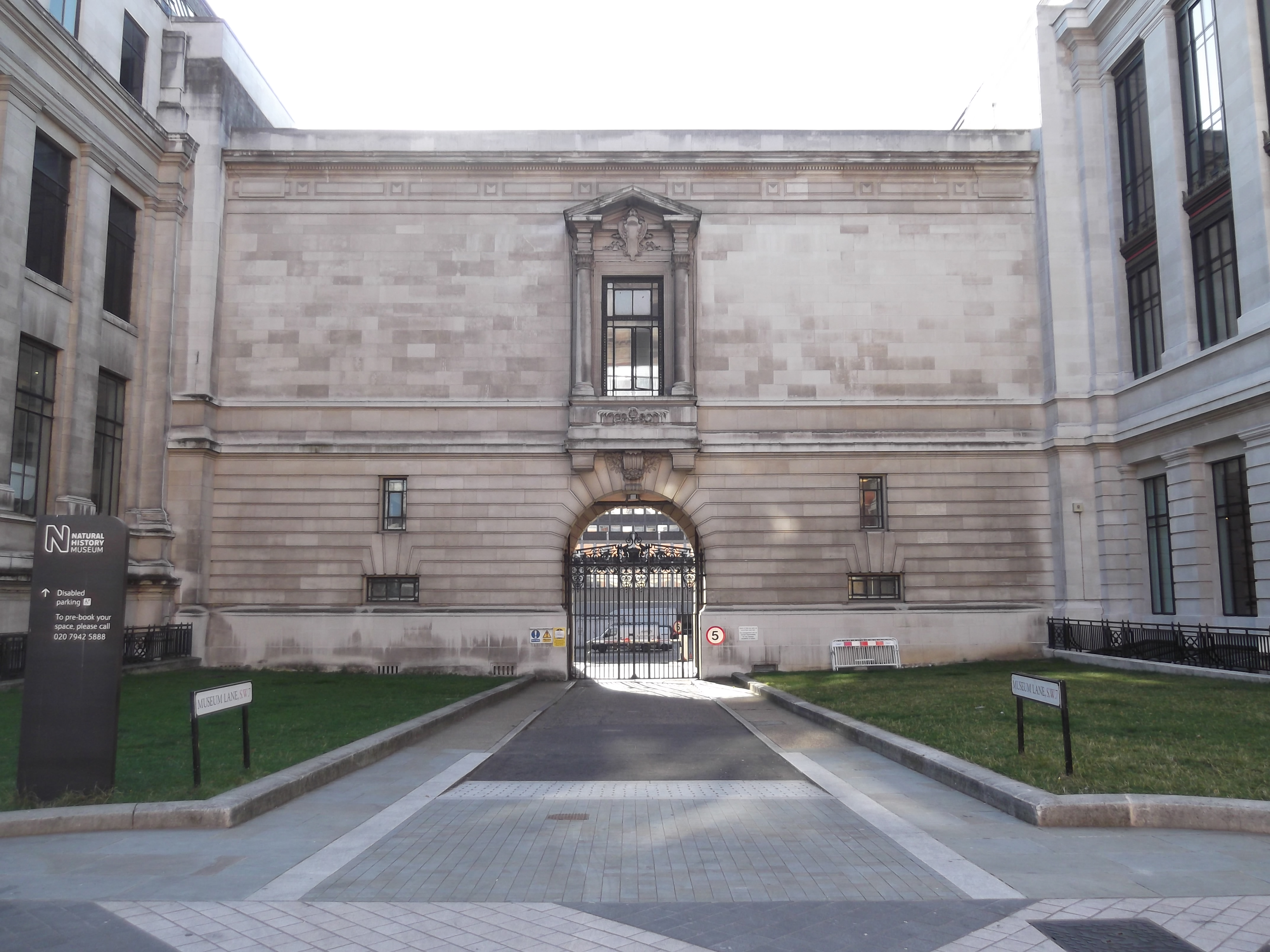
Museum Lane separates the Natural History and Science museums

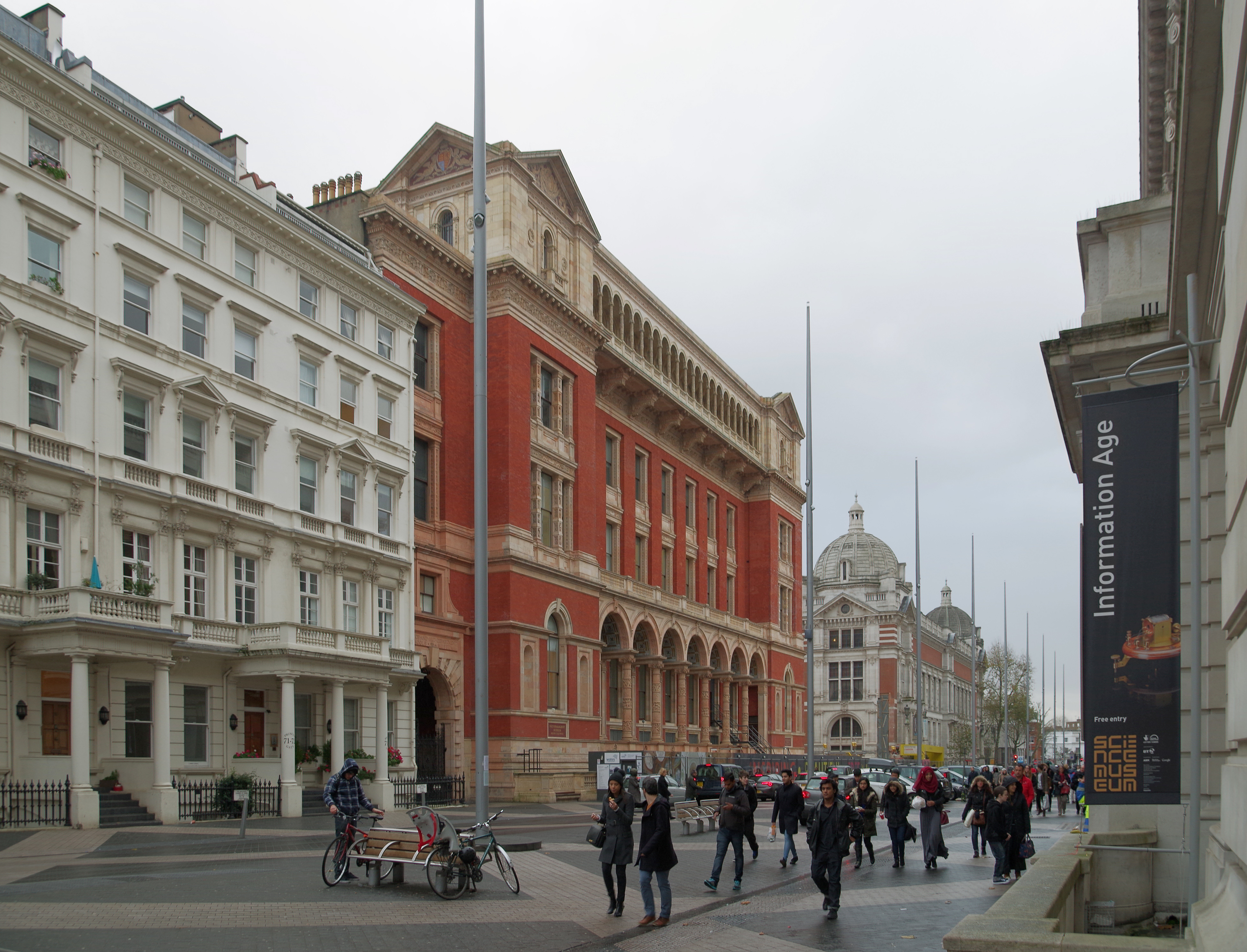
The V&A and the shared-space scheme

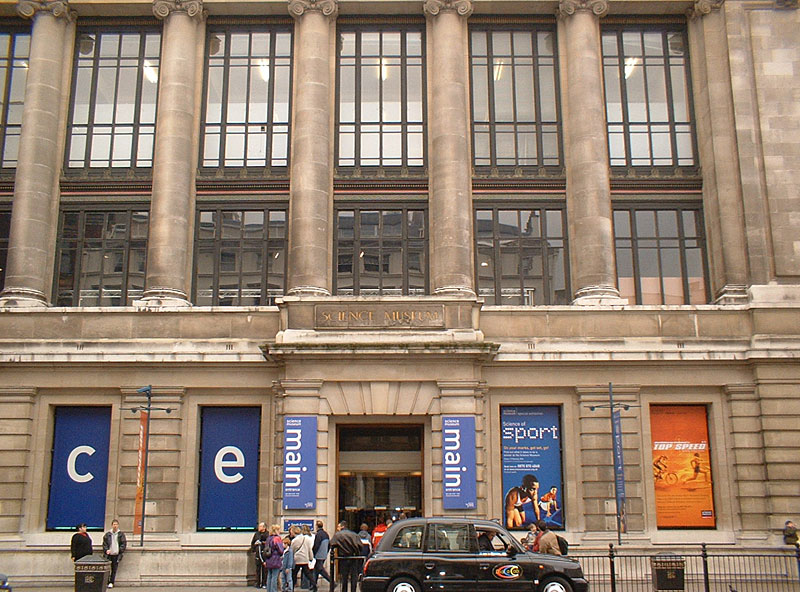
The Science Museum

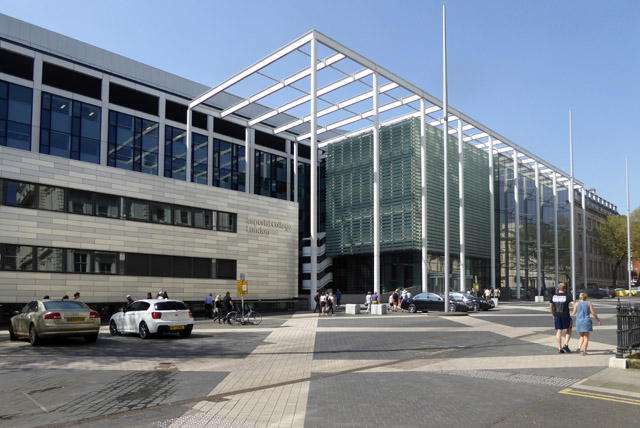
The main entrance of Imperial College London

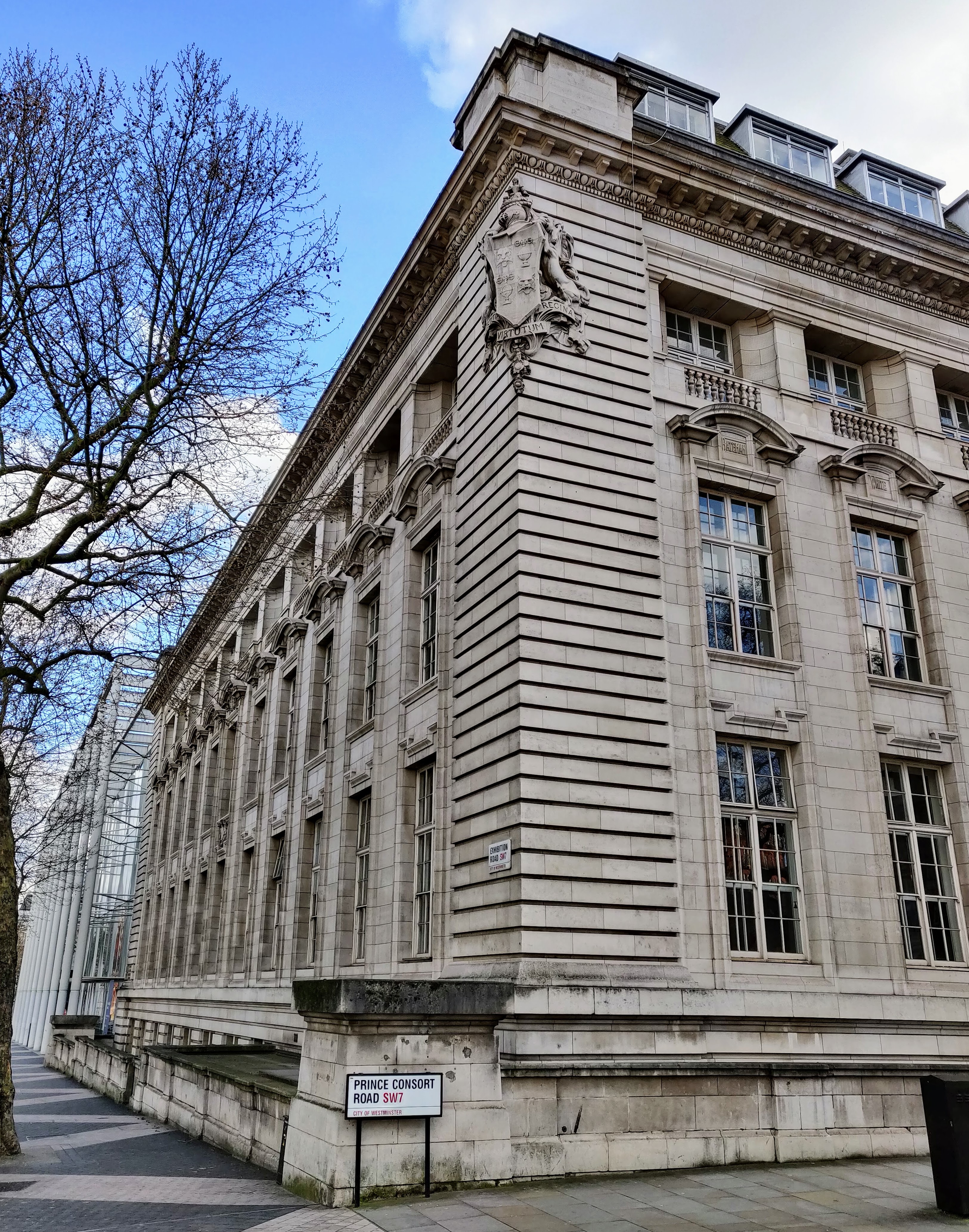
Royal School of Mines and Prince Consort Road

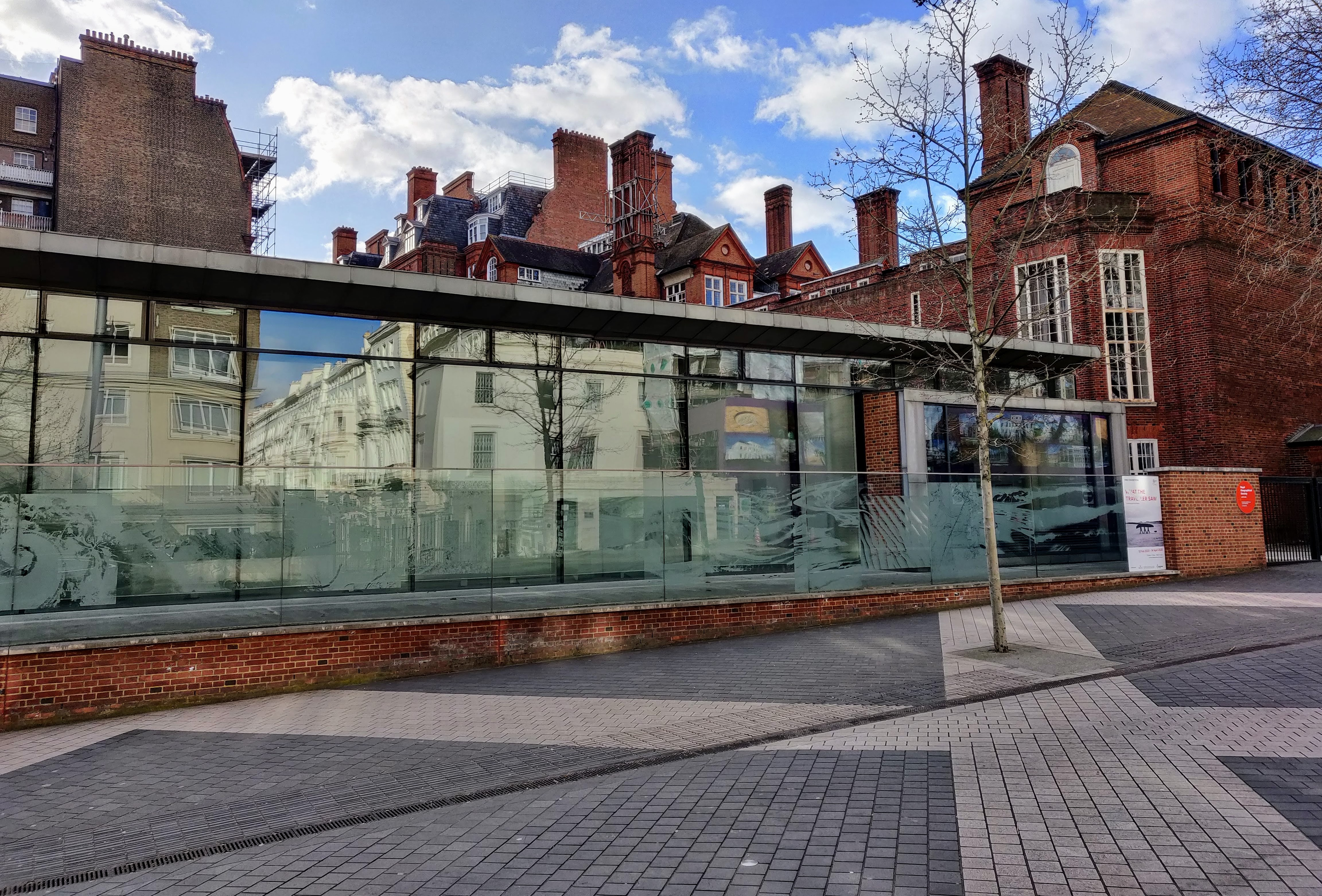
Royal Geographical Society

== See also ==
- Cromwell Gardens
- Cromwell Road
- Museum Lane
- Thurloe Square
- Prince Consort Road
