= James Cook Research Fellowship =

Fellowship in New Zealand

The James Cook Research Fellowship is a New Zealand fellowship awarded annually to three recipients by the Royal Society Te Apārangi, in recognition of sustained excellence in research. It is generally regarded as prestigious.

== History ==
The scheme is government-funded and administered by the Royal Society Te Apārangi, and commemorates James Cook. The first fellowships were awarded in 1996 and the last in 2023. The scheme was among a number of research funding schemes replaced by the New Zealand Mana Tūārangi Distinguished Researcher Fellowships.

The fellowships are "one of the premier awards for scientific, technological and social science research" and are awarded in recognition of sustained excellence in research. Fellows are researchers who "are able to demonstrate that they have achieved national and international recognition in their area of research." Each fellow receives $100,000 plus GST per annum for two years, to relieve them of administrative and teaching burdens, and $10,000 of expenses, in order to allow researchers to undertake "a major piece of research that will benefit New Zealand and advance research in their particular discipline".

The focus areas of the fellowship change each year. In 2023 the fellows came from health sciences, engineering sciences and technologies, and social sciences.

=== Not to be confused with Captain James Cook Fellowship ===
The three-year fellowship begun in 1996 should not be confused with the earlier Captain James Cook Fellowship, also awarded by the Royal Society of New Zealand. This fellowship was established in 1968 to commemorate the bicentenary of Cook's landing in New Zealand, and was awarded to one person at a time for two or three years study. It was available to both New Zealand and overseas applicants, and funded "research within New Zealand or the south-west Pacific region" in the fields of anthropology, geophysics, biology, history, geography, medicine, geology and oceanography.

== Fellows ==
Notable recipients include:

- Atholl Anderson – New Zealand archaeologist and anthropologist (born 1943)
- Judith Binney – New Zealand writer, academic and historian
- Margaret Brimble – New Zealand chemist
- Paul Callaghan – New Zealand physicist (1947–2012)
- Marston Conder – New Zealand mathematician
- Michael Corballis – New Zealand psychologist and author (1936–2021)
- Charles Higham (archaeologist) – British-born New Zealand archaeologist
- Lisa Matisoo-Smith – New Zealand biological anthropologist
- Renate Meyer (statistician) – Professor of statistics in New Zealand
- Robert Poulin – Evolutionary ecologist
- Susan Schenk – New Zealand academic psychologist
- Regina Scheyvens - New Zealand development academic
- Mike Steel (mathematician) – New Zealand mathematician and statistician
- Holly Thorpe – New Zealand sociologist and academic
