= Patricia Hunt (chemist) =

New Zealand theoretical chemist

- Born: 1976
- Awards: New Zealand Mana Tūārangi Distinguished Researcher Fellowship

Academic background
- Education: University of Auckland
- Thesis: Jahn-Teller Distortions in Molecules Containing Group 15 Elements (1998)
- Doctoral advisor: Peter Schwerdtfeger

Patricia Anne Hunt is a New Zealand chemist, and is a full professor at Victoria University of Wellington, specialising in ionic bonds in liquids. In 2024 Hunt was awarded one of two New Zealand Mana Tūārangi Distinguished Researcher Fellowships by the Royal Society Te Apārangi.

== Academic career ==
Hunt completed a Bachelor of Science, a Master of Science in physics and chemistry, a Bachelor of Arts in politics and philosophy, and a PhD titled Jahn-Teller Distortions in Molecules Containing Group 15 Elements at the University of Auckland. Hunt then undertook postdoctoral research at King's College London and Cambridge University. She was awarded a UK Royal Society University Research Fellowship, which she used to work at Imperial College London. She was made Professor of Theoretical and Computational Chemistry at Imperial in 2018, and moved to Victoria University of Wellington in 2020.

Hunt researches the structure and chemical bonds in solvents and ionic liquids. In 2022 she received a Marsden grant to model the structure of ionic liquids.

Hunt is an associate investigator in the MacDiarmid Institute for Advance Materials and Nanotechnology.

== Honours and awards ==
In 2011 Hunt received a President's Award for Excellence in Teaching at Imperial, and in 2015 she was awarded a prize for her research supervision. In November 2024 the Royal Society Te Apārangi awarded Hunt one of two inaugural New Zealand Mana Tūārangi Distinguished Researcher Fellowships. The fellowship was awarded for work "to use quantum chemical modelling to investigate ionic liquid micro-propulsion systems for mini satellites".

== Selected works ==
- Metcalfe, Ian; Greg A. Mutch; Evangelos I. Papaioannou; Sotiria Tsochataridou; Dragos Neagu; Dan J. L. Brett; Iacoviello, Francesco; Miller, Thomas; Paul R. Shearing; Hunt, Patricia (2024). "Separation and concentration of CO2 from air using a humidity-driven molten-carbonate membrane" (PDF). Nature Energy. doi:10.1038/s41560-024-01588-6. Wikidata Q131195798.
- Ashworth, Claire; Matthews, Richard; Welton, Thomas; Hunt, Patricia (2016). "Doubly ionic hydrogen bond interactions within the choline chloride-urea deep eutectic solvent". Physical Chemistry Chemical Physics. 18 (27): 18145–18160. doi:10.1039/c6cp02815b. PMID 27328990. Wikidata Q87721253.
- Hunt, Patricia; Ashworth, Claire; Matthews, Richard (2015). "Hydrogen bonding in ionic liquids". Chemical Society Reviews. 44 (5): 1257–1288. doi:10.1039/c4cs00278d. PMID 25582457. Wikidata Q38315930.
- Matthews, Richard; Welton, Thomas; Hunt, Patricia (2014). "Competitive pi interactions and hydrogen bonding within imidazolium ionic liquids". Physical Chemistry Chemical Physics. 16 (7): 3238. doi:10.1039/c3cp54672a. PMID 24407103. Wikidata Q57390151.
- Heiko Niedermeyer; Hallett, Jason; Ignacio J Villar-Garcia; Hunt, Patricia; Welton, Thomas (2012). "Mixtures of ionic liquids". Chemical Society Reviews. 41 (23): 7780–7802. doi:10.1039/c2cs35177c. PMID 22890419. Wikidata Q38034415.
- M A Ab Rani; A Brant; L Crowhurst; et al. (2011). "Understanding the polarity of ionic liquids". Physical Chemistry Chemical Physics. 13 (37): 16831–16840. doi:10.1039/c1cp21262a. PMID 21858359. Wikidata Q57390177.
- Hunt, Patricia (2007). "Why does a reduction in hydrogen bonding lead to an increase in viscosity for the 1-butyl-2,3-dimethyl-imidazolium-based ionic liquids?". The Journal of Physical Chemistry B. 111 (18): 4844–4853. doi:10.1021/jp067182p. PMID 17388550. Wikidata Q80047930.
- Hunt, Patricia; Kirchner, Barbara; Welton, Thomas (2006). "Characterising the Electronic Structure of Ionic Liquids: An Examination of the 1-Butyl-3-Methylimidazolium Chloride Ion Pair". Chemistry: A European Journal. 12 (26): 6762–6775. doi:10.1002/chem.200600103. PMID 16807969. Wikidata Q57390232.
