= Glitter =

Shiny and small reflective particles

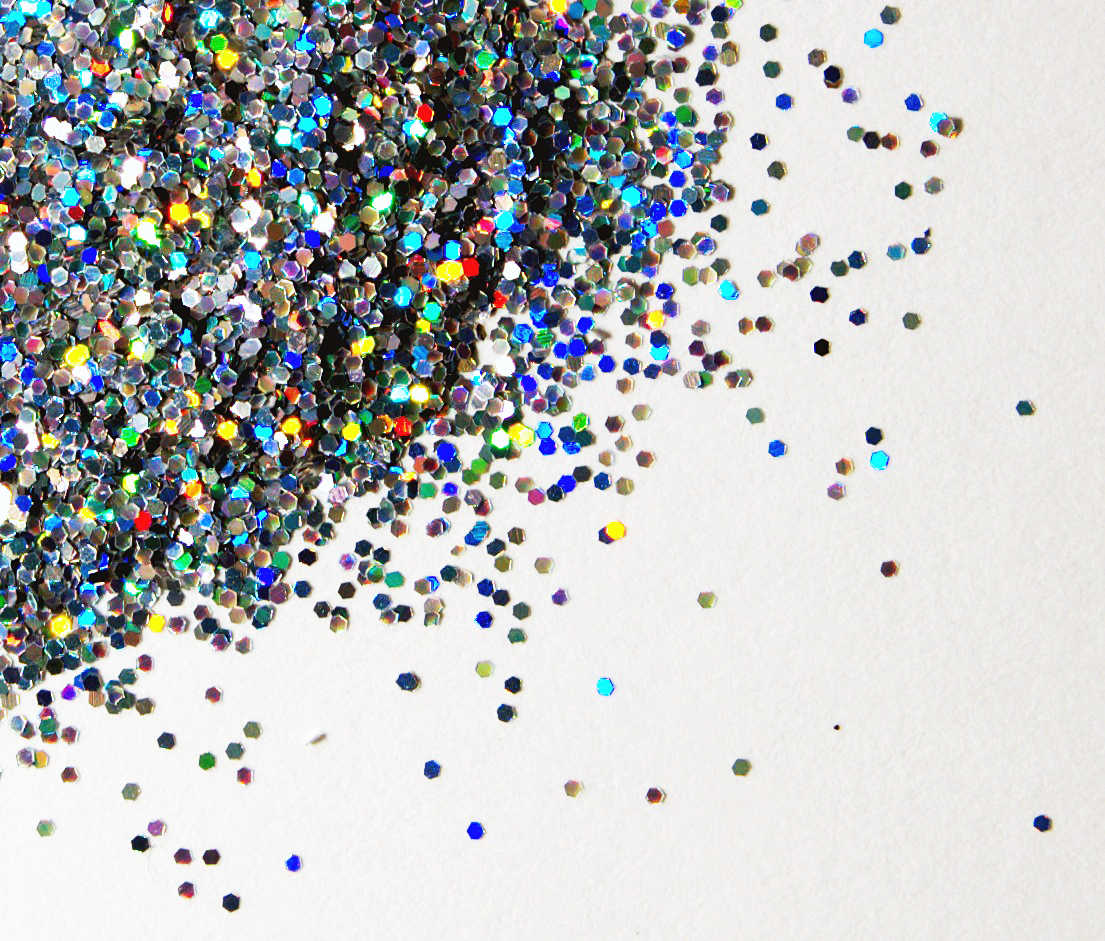
Close-up of holographic glitter

Glitter is an assortment of flat, small, reflective particles that are precision cut and come in a variety of shapes, sizes, and colors. Glitter particles resemble confetti, sparkles and sequins, but are somewhat smaller.

Since prehistoric times, glitter has been made from many different materials including stones such as malachite, and mica, as well as insects and glass. Uses for glitter include clothing, arts, crafts, cosmetics and body paint. Modern glitter is usually manufactured from the combination of aluminum and plastic, which is rarely recycled and can find its way into aquatic habitats, eventually becoming ingested by animals, leading some scientists to call for bans on plastic glitter.

== Antiquity ==
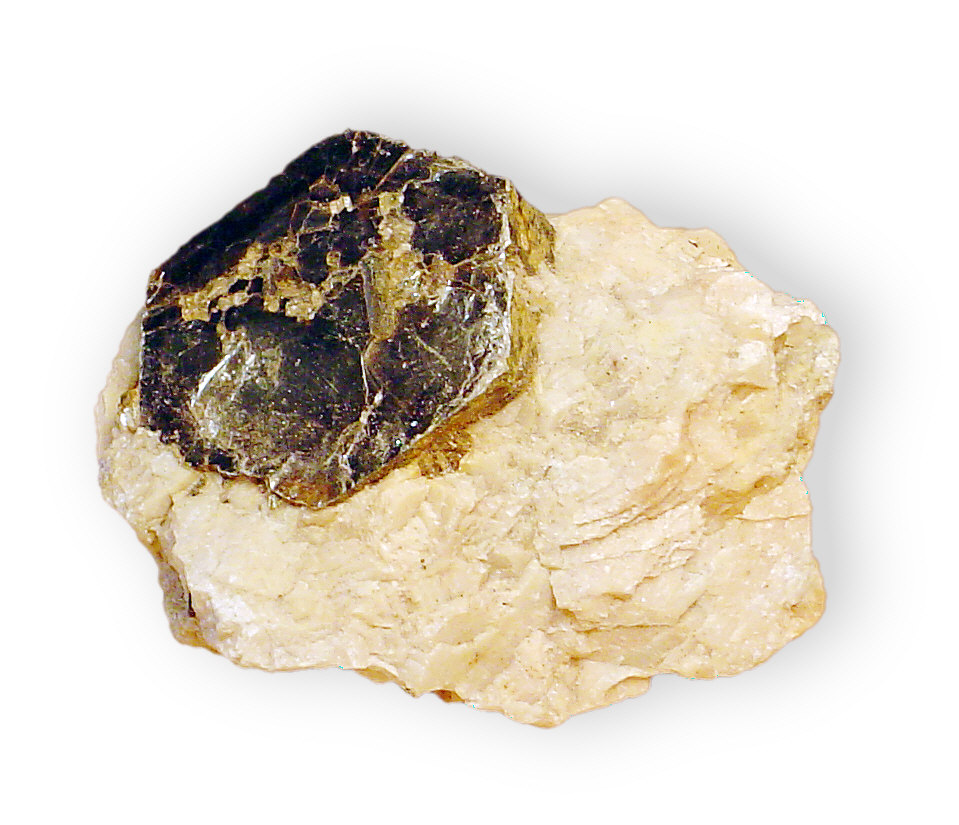
Mica

Glittering surfaces have been found to be used since prehistoric times in the arts and in cosmetics. The modern English word "glitter" comes from the Middle English word gliteren, possibly by way of the Old Norse word glitra. However, as early as 30,000 years ago, mica flakes were used to give cave paintings a glittering appearance. Prehistoric humans are believed to have used cosmetics, made of powdered hematite, a sparkling mineral.

The Ancient Egyptians produced "glitter-like substances from crushed beetles" as well as finely ground green malachite crystal. Researchers believe Mayan temples were sometimes painted with red, green, and grey glitter paint made from mica dust, based on infrared scans of the remnants of paint still found on the structures in present-day Guatemala.

People of the Americas 8,000 years ago were using powdered galena, a form of lead, to produce a bright greyish-white glittering paint used for objects of adornment. The collecting and surface mining of galena was prevalent in the Upper Mississippi Valley region by the Cahokia native peoples, for regional trade both raw and crafted into beads or other objects.

== Modern glitter ==
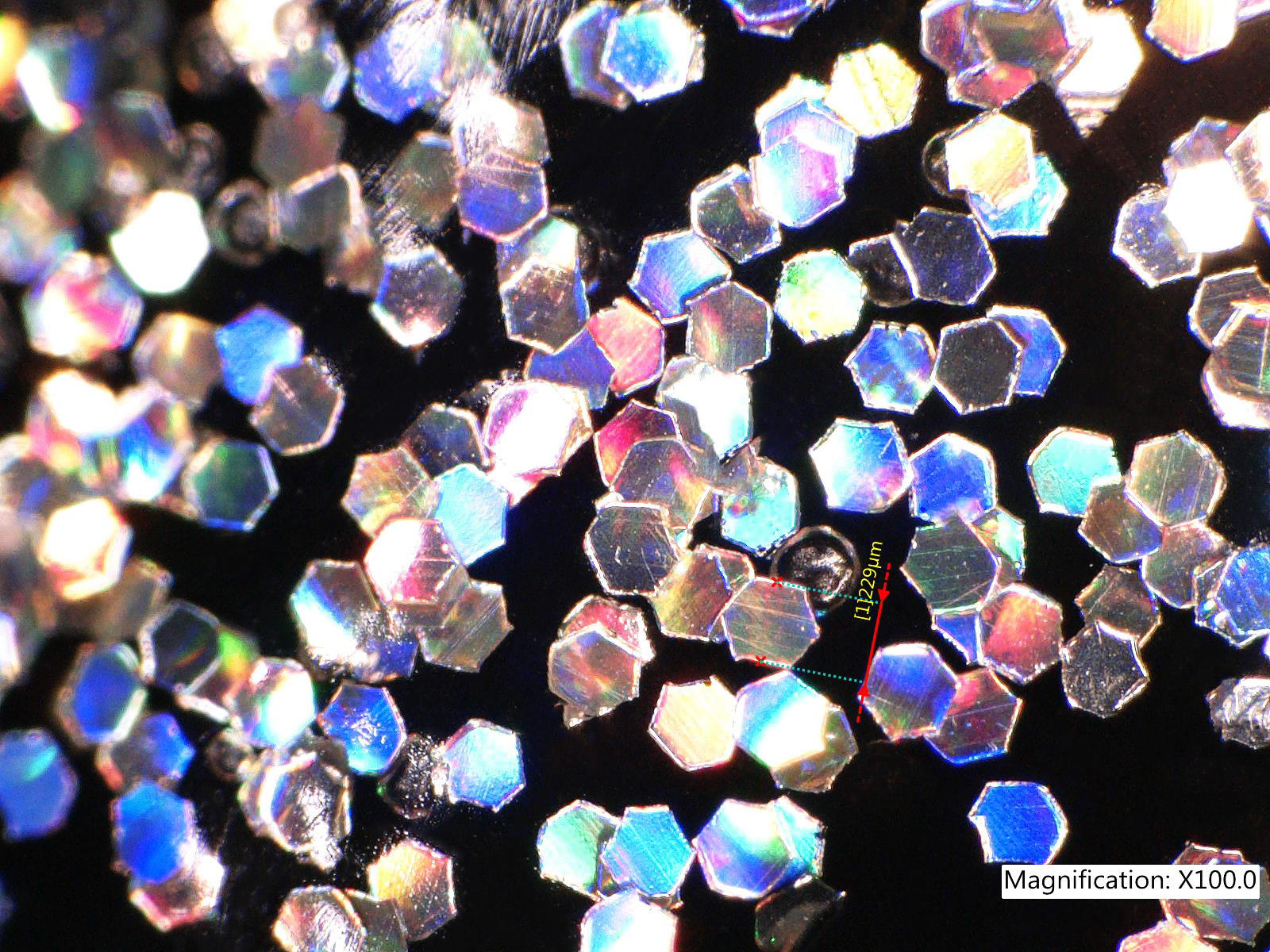
Magnified nail polish

=== Development ===
The first production of modern plastic glitter is credited to the American machinist Henry F. Ruschmann who invented a machine to cut photo films and paper in the 1930s. Sometimes, the machine "stuttered," generating small pieces of glossy cellulose that employees picked up and used as "snow" to decorate their Christmas trees, and modern glitter was born. With his partner, Harry Goetz, Ruschmann cut mica into washers and glitter from metallized cellulose acetate film. During World War II, glass glitter became unavailable, so Ruschmann found a market for scrap plastics, which were ground into glitter. In 1943, he purchased Meadowbrook Farm in Bernardsville, New Jersey where he founded Meadowbrook Farm Inventions (MFI) in 1948 to produce industrial glitter. MFI became Meadowbrook Inventions, Inc. in 1953. Ruschmann filed a patent for a mechanism for cross-cutting films as well as other glitter-related inventions. Substrates for cutting glitter expanded from metalized cellulose and aluminum foil to metalized and iridescent film, polyester, PVC, and laminations cut into various shapes.

=== Production ===
Today over 20,000 varieties of glitter are manufactured in a vast number of different colors, sizes, and materials. One estimate suggests 10 million pounds (4.5 million kilograms) of glitter was either purchased or produced between the years of 1989 and 2009, however the source provides no evidence or reference point. Commercial glitter ranges in size from 0.002 to .25 inches (0.05 to 6.35 mm) a side. First, flat multi-layered sheets are produced combining plastic, coloring, and reflective material such as aluminium, titanium dioxide, iron oxide, and bismuth oxychloride. A common plastic is PET plastic, but mica can be used. Alongside plastic glitters, mica and cellulose based glitters are also common, and very similar in appearance to regular glitter. The reflective material is often deposited using vacuum deposition (physical vapor deposition). These sheets are then cut into tiny particles of many shapes, including squares, triangles, rectangles, and hexagons. Specialized glitter machines cut the metalized plastic film into glitter using a cutting wheel, similarly to grinding.

=== Use ===
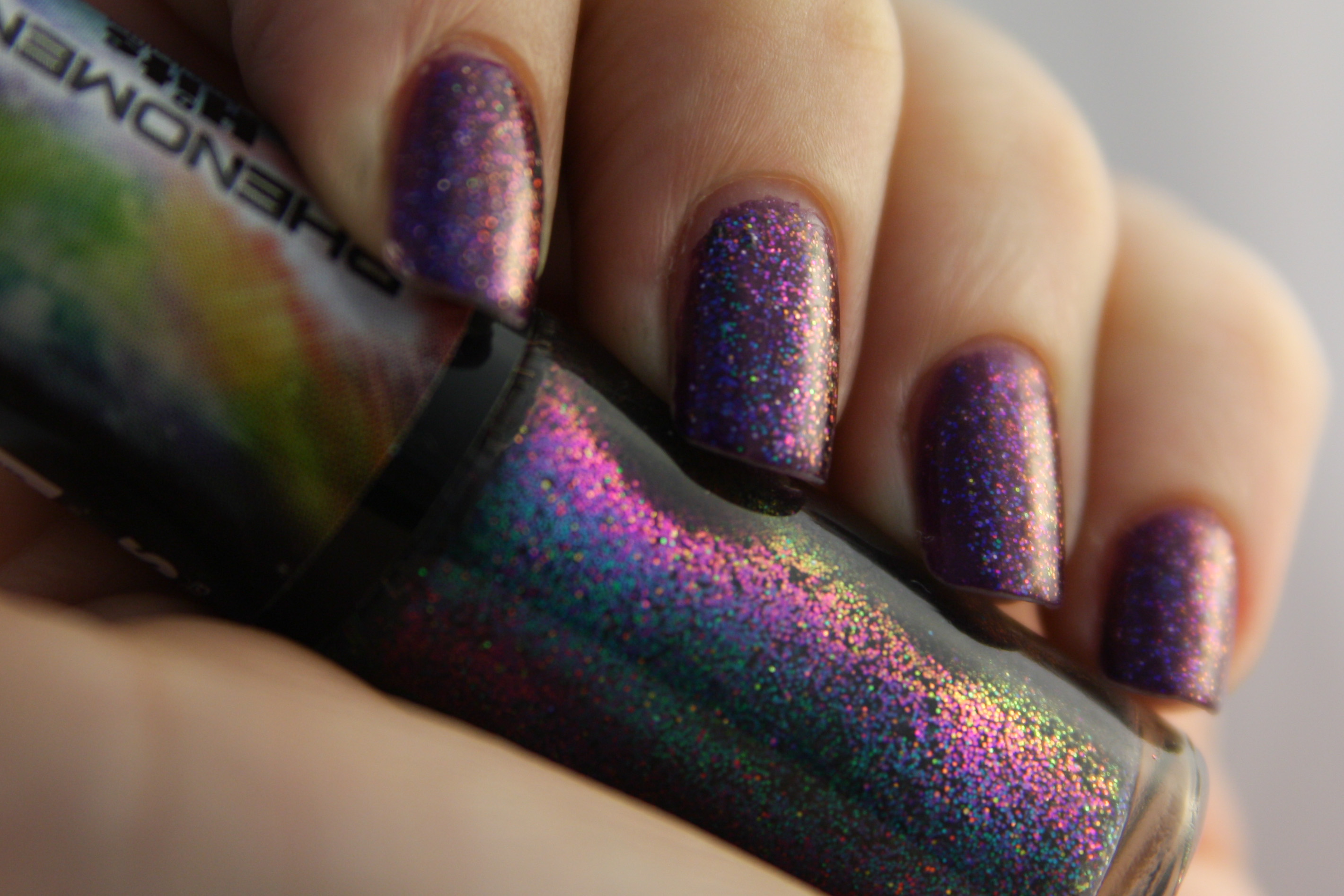
Glitter nail polish

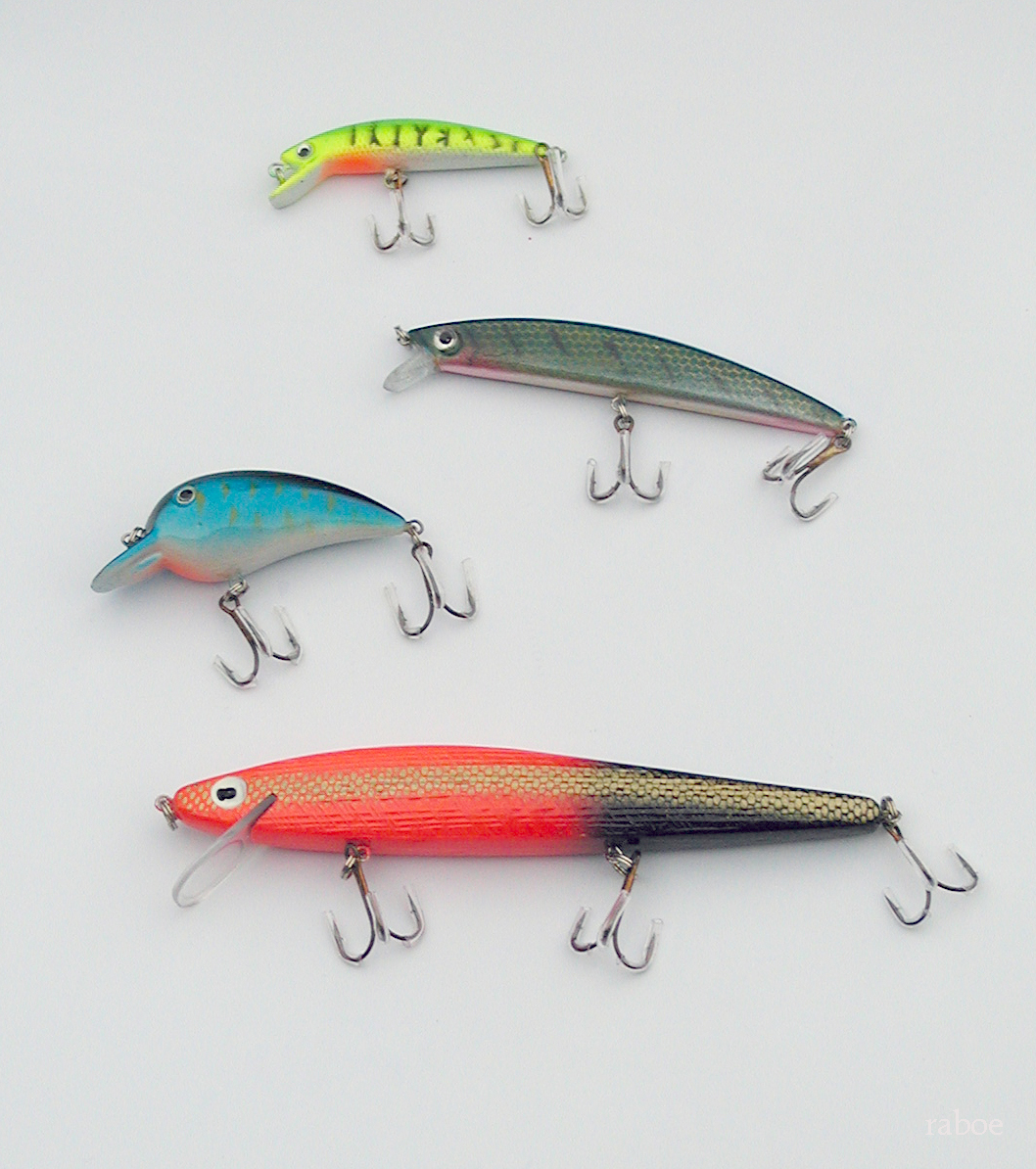
Iridescent fishing lures

Furniture made of glitter PVC.

Before fabrics made with modern glitter, sequins were sewn or woven onto fabric to give it a glittering appearance. Though used for similar purposes, sequins and glitter differ heavily, sequins are larger plastic disks whereas glitter is smaller plastic particles.Edible glitter made from gum arabic and other ingredients is even used by culinary artists.

Glitter is used in cosmetics to make the face and nails shiny or sparkly.

Glitter is commonly used in arts and crafts to color, accessorise and texture items. The small, brightly colored particles often stick to clothing, skin, and furniture and can be difficult to remove. It is also used in optically variable inks.

Glitter coatings or finishes are frequently used on fishing lures to draw attention by simulating the scales of prey fish.

Due to its unique characteristics, glitter has also proven to be useful forensic evidence. Because of the tens of thousands of different commercial glitters, identical glitter particles can be compelling evidence that a suspect has been at a crime scene. Forensic scientist Edwin Jones has one of the largest collections of glitter, consisting of over 1,000 different samples used in comparison to samples taken from crime scenes. Glitter particles are easily transferred through the air or by touch yet cling to bodies and clothing, often unnoticed by suspects.

==== Holographic glitter ====
Holographic glitter was developed in 1967 by Henry W. Ruschmann, son of Henry F. Ruschmann. It embosses a diffraction grating (hologram) onto the film to reflect different colors of light in different directions, producing a rainbow effect. Holographic glitter is used in security applications, including credit cards, passports, and some countries’ paper currency. Other common uses are cosmetics and holiday packaging.

== Glitter in culture ==
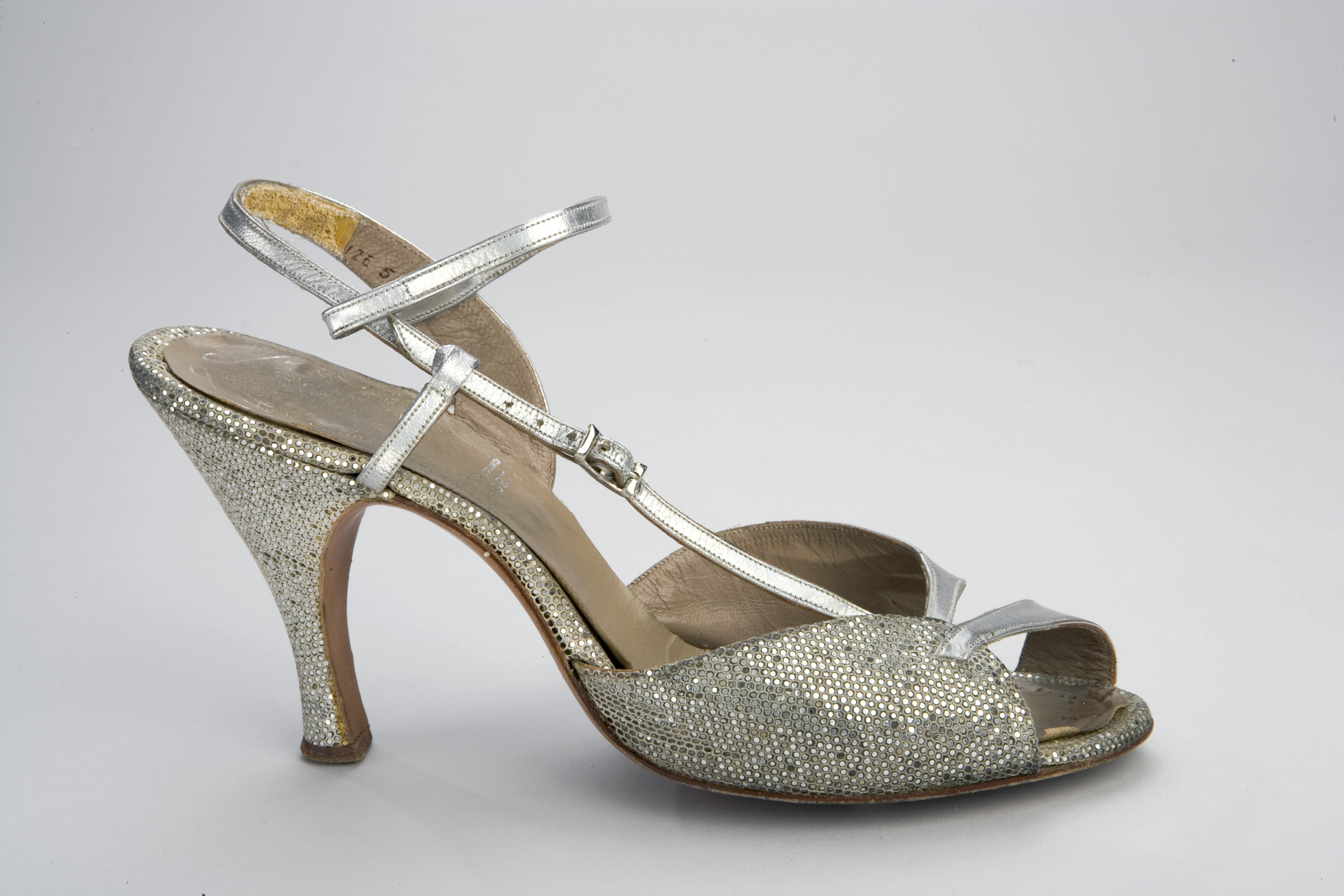
Glitter shoes

Glitter can be seen as a tool of fashion used by various subcultures, as it allows for a visible statement to be worn and seen on the body. This is because it has been theorized to be a "flickering signifier", or something that destabilizes known notions of popular culture, identity, and society. Glitter is associated with "fringe cultures", which often use excessive glitz and glamor (such as glitter) to evoke a deeper understanding between the relationships of commercialized popular culture and "high" culture, or "high-brow" art.

Used by glam rockers, such as David Bowie, Gary Glitter, Sons Of The East and Iggy Pop as a tool to help blur gender lines helped to create the more extreme "glitter rock" – an even more heightened version of glam rock.

Glitter is also used by nail artists and make-up artists to make statements about femininity and beauty standards. The flashy, sparkling nature of glitter allows users to push standard ideas of beauty and what is and is not considered "excessive" in terms of make-up. Glitter is usually associated with nightlife and not professionalism, but wearing it in different settings can push these boundaries.

Because it tends to shed off items it is applied to and stick onto unwanted surfaces, including skin, hair, and clothes, glitter is also used for glitter bombing, which is an act of protest in which activists throw glitter on people at public events. Glitter bombers have frequently been motivated by, though not limited to, their targets' opposition to same-sex marriage. Some legal officials argue glitter bombing is technically assault and battery. Glitter can enter the eyes or nose and cause damage to the cornea or other soft tissues potentially irritating them or leading to infection, depending on the size of the glitter. Whether a prosecutor would pursue the charges depends on a number of factors.

== Environmental impact ==
Trisia Farrelly, an environmental anthropologist at Massey University, has called for a ban on glitter made of polyethylene terephthalate (PETE) and aluminum, as it is a microplastic that can leach hormonal disruptors into the environment. Furthermore, plastic glitter takes about one thousand years to biodegrade, according to Victoria Miller, a materials and engineering scientist at North Carolina State University. When dozens of British music festivals pledged to ban single-use plastics by 2021, the proposed ban included plastic glitter.

Biodegradable glitter made from eucalyptus tree extract is metaled with aluminium and can be coloured. It is "40% softer and more delicate on the skin than conventional glitter," and it decomposes in soil or water. Cellulose glitter is also available.

According to Chris Flower, director-general of the Cosmetic Toiletry and Perfumery Association, "the total contribution to marine plastic litter from glittery cosmetic products is negligible when compared to the damaging effects of bags and bottles... [While the] total effect of giving up traditional glitter might not be great compared to other harmful plastics, we should still do everything we can."

Since October 2023, some types of glitter have been restricted in the European Union as part of a ban on microplastics intentionally added to products.Specifically the EU has banned all plastic sourced glitters alongside other microplastics like beads, and loose plastics.

== See also ==
- Glitterex – a US manufacturer of Glitter
- Sparkling

== Sources ==
- White, Michele (2015). Producing Women: The Internet, Traditional Femininity, Queerness, and Creativity. doi:10.4324/9781315773049. ISBN 978-1-317-68024-6. OCLC 889666420.
