= Renate Meyer =

Renate Meyer may refer to:

- Renate Meyer (sprinter)
- Renate Meyer (statistician)
