= The Scientists' Coalition for an Effective Plastics Treaty =

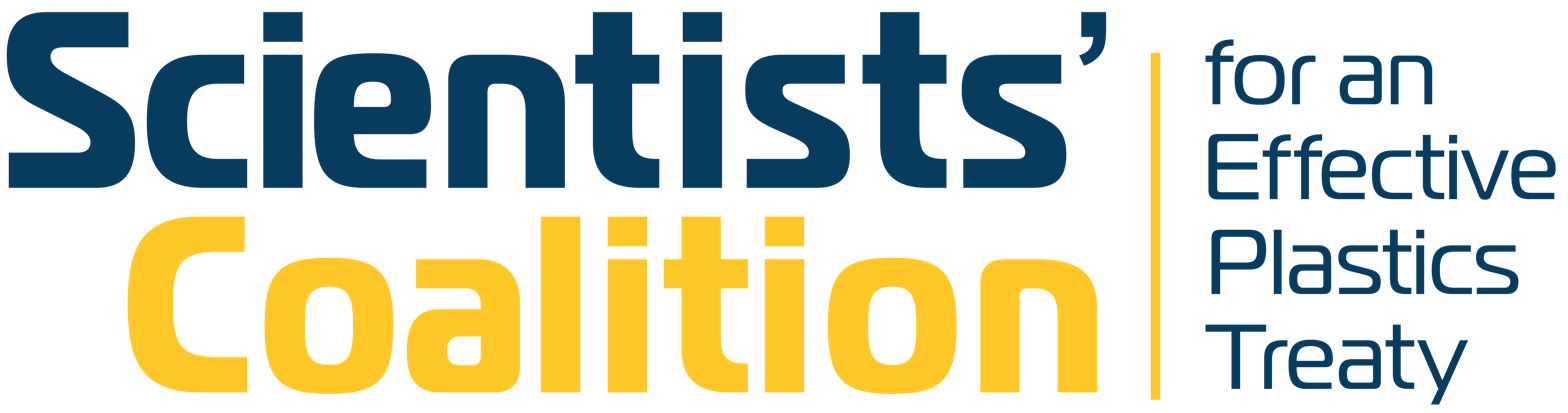
Scientists Coalition Logo

The Scientists' Coalition for an Effective Plastics Treaty is a network of international, independent scientific and technical experts on plastic pollution. They aim to provide scientific information to countries involved in the negotiations towards a global agreement to end plastic pollution. The Global plastic pollution treaty is part of the work of United Nations Environment Programme (UNEP). The coalition have insisted that scientists and scientific knowledge should be involved in the negotiations. One goal of the Scientists' Coalition is to give advice and summaries to low and middle-income country representatives who may not have scientific advisors.

== Activities ==
The Scientists' Coalition have produced numerous summaries and reports related to plastic pollution. and participated in the UNEP conferences focused on the Global plastic pollution treaty. 60 members of the coalition participated in the Intergovernmental Negotiating Committee on Plastic Pollution meeting in Canada in 2024 being available to answer questions to representatives who wanted more scientific knowledge on the topic. They further drafted an open letter to United States President Biden in March 2024 advocating the use of independent scientific consensus in negotiations of the plastics treaty.

== Members ==
Members of the coalition must have a record of research in plastics pollution and be independent of any conflicting interests. In 2025, The Scientists' Coalition had over 450 members from 70 countries. Coordinators of the group are Trisia Farrelly, Bethanie Carney Almroth and Richard Thompson.
