= Tāwhia te Mana Research Fellowships =

Fellowship scheme in New Zealand

The Tāwhia te Mana Research Fellowships are three science fellowships in New Zealand conferred by the Ministry of Business, Innovation and Employment.

== History ==
The establishment of the Tāwhia te Mana Research Fellowships followed a review of the science funding system that resulted in a 2022 white paper. The Tāwhia te Mana scheme is intended to support up to 30 fellows per year from funding of $27.38 million. The scheme includes three fellowships. The fellowships replace the Rutherford Foundation fellowship scheme, the Rutherford Discovery Fellowships and the James Cook Research Fellowships, which all ended in 2023. Tāwhia te Mana will also include a new applied doctorate scheme.

== New Zealand Mana Tūāpapa Future Leader Fellowship ==
The New Zealand Mana Tūāpapa Future Leader Fellowship is designed for "early-career researchers looking to build the foundations of a strong reputation in their field". It is a 4-year fellowship for researchers of 0–6 years experience. The fellowship provides $82.5k for salary, $82.5k for overheads and $40k research expenses per annum. Twenty fellowships will be awarded each year.

== New Zealand Mana Tūānuku Research Leader Fellowship ==
The New Zealand Mana Tūānuku Research Leader Fellowship is designed for "mid-career researchers building an established and expansive reputation, and looking to make the transition to research leaders, both in their field and across the system". It is a 4-year fellowship for researchers with 6–12 years experience. The fellowship provides $115k for salary, $115k for institutional overheads, and $60k for research expenses annually. Ten awards will be made each year.

== New Zealand Mana Tūārangi Distinguished Researcher Fellowship ==
The New Zealand Mana Tūārangi Distinguished Researcher Fellowship is aimed at "senior researchers building an expansive reputation that includes making contributions that extend beyond their own careers to benefit the wider research, science and innovation system". It provides $220k for one or two years, to be divided between salary contribution and research expenses. Two awards will be made each year. In November 2024 it was announced the first recipients would be Christian Hartinger (University of Auckland) and Patricia Hunt (Victoria University of Wellington).
