= Global plastic pollution treaty =

Proposed international treaty

Global Plastic Pollution Treaty
International legally binding agreement on plastics
- Type: International treaty

In March 2022, the UN Environment Assembly resolved to end plastic pollution with an international treaty that would address the plastics life cycle, from design to production and disposal. The UN member states, which held talks for more than a week in Nairobi, agreed to establish an Intergovernmental Negotiating Committee (INC) with the mandate of creating a legally-binding international agreement by the end of 2024. The resolution was entitled "End plastic pollution: Towards an international legally binding instrument."

As of 2025, the INC had met six times but failed to make progress. Fault lines throughout the INC negotiations arose between the majority of states seeking to obtain an ambitious treaty (some of them united as the High Ambition Coalition, which as of September 2025 had 75 member states) and a minority of petrochemical producing nations. The text of the draft treaty either contained hundreds of disputed details or was so insubstantial that the ambitious states refused to accept it. The influence of lobbyists was also frequently criticized. Following the failure of the Geneva meeting in August 2025, Inger Andersen of the United Nations Environment Programme (UNEP), which hosted the committee, said that time would be needed for the nations to regroup. The process is currently considered to be deadlocked as divides exist that appear difficult to overcome among member states.

Besides delegates of UN member states, observers from a variety of organizations were also present, following treaty negotiations. Notable observers include John Chweya.

== Timeline ==
Following UNEA-5.2, the mandate specified that the INC must begin its work by the end of 2022 with the goal of "completing a draft global legally binding agreement by the end of 2024."

Work towards the treaty began with the meeting of an ad hoc open-ended working group in Dakar from May 30 through June 1, 2022. During that meeting, Member States established a timeline for subsequent meetings through the end of 2024, rules of procedure, and the initial scope of work for the first meeting of the INC.

- The first meeting of the negotiating committee (INC-1) took place in Punta del Este from November 28, 2022, through December 2, 2022. The agenda contained items including the formal adoption of the rules of procedure. Over 2,300 delegates from 160 countries participated.
- The second meeting of the negotiating committee (INC-2) took place in Paris from May 29, 2023, through June 2, 2023.
- The third session (INC-3) took place from November 13–19, 2023 at the UN Environment Programme (UNEP) Headquarters in Nairobi
- The fourth session (INC-4) took place from April 23–29, 2024 in Ottawa. 196 fossil fuel lobbyists attended – more than the number of scientists.
- The fifth session, first part (INC-5.1) took place from November 25 to December 1, 2024, in Busan. This was originally scheduled to be the final round of negotiations but no agreement was reached.
- The fifth session, second part (INC-5.2) took place from August 5 to 15, 2025 in Geneva. The treaty was to be finalized at the conference of the plenipotentiaries. The negotiations failed and no agreement was concluded.
- The fifth session, third part (INC-5.3) took place on February 7 in Geneva. It was held mainly for administrative purposes and to elect a new INC Chair and did not advance the negotiations in itself.

In addition an intermediary meeting took place in 2024 to advance treaty negotiations (UNEA-6 in Nairobi, Kenya in 2024).

== Formats of negotiations ==
During INC sessions, negotiations took place in various formats.

- Contact groups: Negotiations based on specific articles of the treaty text. All states with delegations participate and can raise their voice. This format was open to observers but with no possibility for interventions. Usually multiple contact groups occurred simultaneously.
- Regional meetings: Closed coordination meetings to discuss and align positions among a certain subgroup of member states, for example based on UN Regional Groups or other groups such as the High Ambition Coalition. Few regional meetings permitted the presence of observers, at least partially.
- Informals: Closed negotiations in an informal framework but organizational aspects (such as duration and room arrangements) might still facilitated by the INC Secretariat. Informal-informals (also known as infinfs) are more casual negotiation settings.
- Plenaries: Official assembly by all negotiating member states. They are used to open and close INC sessions and to report on progress of negotiations. Plenaries are open to observers and are also broadcast and recorded. Observers united as alliances might be able to contribute short interventions if the INC Secretariat permits. A total of 29 plenaries were held during all six negotiation sessions.

Besides these formal formats of negotiations delegates and observers were able to participate in side events, press conferences and so on.

== Content ==
Members agreed that the treaty should be international in scope, legally binding, and address the full life cycle of plastics, including their design, production, and disposal. It has been argued that chemicals contained in plastics such as additives, processing aids, and unintentionally added substances need to be addressed too.

The Earth Negotiations Bulletin provided a daily overview of the proceeding of negotiations.

== Criticism of the treaty proceedings ==
Different aspects of the treaty process were criticized, for example the repeated failure to conclude the process in the projected time period, differences in the member states' capacity to send delegates, and the strong presence of industry lobbyists. Reforms of the treaty process are demanded by researchers demanding evidence-based decision making and a meaningful inclusion of civil society. Some researchers suggested to move global negotiations out of the UNEP framework, to allow countries who want to obtain a strong treaty to establish their own rules of procedures.

== Support for the treaty ==
In the lead-up to UNEA-5.2, the majority of UN member states had expressed their support for a global treaty. During the treaty negotiations the High Ambition Coalition to End Plastic Pollution formed with the goal to obtain an ambitious treaty text.

Other groups making public declarations about the need for a treaty included the business sector, civil society, indigenous peoples, workers, trade unions, waste pickers and scientists.

Greenpeace activists hung banners stating "Big Oil Polluting Inside" and "Plastic Treaty Not For Sale" from the entrance to the Palais the Nations and sprayed the road black to point out industry influence.

The artist Benjamin Von Wong installed an art piece at the Palais de Nations as "a public call for world leaders to finalize an ambitious treaty".

== See also ==
- The Scientists' Coalition for an Effective Plastics Treaty
