= Ken Seddon =

English chemist (1950–2018)

Kenneth Richard Seddon OBE (31 August 1950 – 21 January 2018) was a chemist specialising in ionic liquids.

== Biography ==
Seddon was born in Liverpool in 1950. He studied chemistry at Liverpool University, completing his PhD in 1973, then took up a research fellowship at the University of Oxford. In 1982 he moved to the School of Chemistry and Molecular Sciences (MOLS) at the University of Sussex. He left Sussex in 1993 to become chair and director of the Queen's University Belfast, where he founded the Queen's University Ionic Liquid Laboratories (QUILL) Research Centre. He was also Professor Catedrático Visitante at the Instituto de Tecnologia Química e Biológica (ITQB), New University of Lisbon, Portugal, and visiting professor at the Chinese Academy of Sciences. He also served as associate editor of the Australian Journal of Chemistry. He was awarded the OBE in 2015.

His students included Alaa Abdul-Sada, John Spencer, and Thomas Welton.

== Obituaries ==
- Obituary in The Telegraph, 31 January 2018
- Kenneth R. Seddon on Superstars of Science. Retrieved 10 February 2018
- Obituary on the University of Sussex website. Retrieved 10 February 2018
- Obituary in Chemistry Views. Retrieved 10 February 2018
