= Richard Thompson (marine biologist) =

Marine biologist

Richard Thompson OBE FRS
- Born: Richard C. Thompson
- Education: University of Newcastle (BSc); University of Liverpool (PhD)
- Awards: Volvo Environment Prize (2022)
- Scientific career
- Fields: Marine biology Microplastics
- Workplaces: University of Plymouth
- Thesis: The Ecology of Epilithic Microalgae (1996)

Richard Charles Thompson is a marine biologist who researches marine litter. At the University of Plymouth he is director of the Marine Institute; professor of Marine Biology; and leads the International Marine Litter Research Unit. In 2025, Time magazine listed him as one of the world's 100 most influential people.

== Education ==
Thompson was educated at University of Newcastle and the University of Liverpool, where he was awarded a PhD in 1996.

== Career and research ==
Thompson's paper, Lost at Sea: Where is All the Plastic?, published in the journal Science in 2004, has been reported to be the first to use the term microplastics in relation to plastic pollution, which has since become common parlance. However, there are examples of the term being used in relation to marine pollution dating back to the early 1990s, and there is evidence that the authors who first used the term had been exploring the topic for several years before.

Since 2010 he has been professor of Marine Biology at the University of Plymouth. Since 2018 he has also been director of the Marine Institute, part of the School of Biological and Marine Sciences at the university. He also leads the university's International Marine Litter Research Unit.

He is a co-coordinator of The Scientists' Coalition for an Effective Plastics Treaty, and in September 2024 led a further study - also published in Science - which stated that after two decades of research into microplastics, the world had sufficient evidence to agree global action to tackle them.

== Awards and honours ==
Thompson was named one of Time Magazine's 100 most influential people in 2025. He was awarded the 2023 Blue Planet Prize alongside Professor Tamara Galloway and Professor Penelope Lindeque, recognising groundbreaking work into global plastics pollution. He was elected as a Fellow of the Royal Society in 2020 for his scientific and policy contributions. In 2017, for services to marine science he received an OBE (Officer of the Order of the British Empire).

== Selected works ==
- Thompson, Richard. (2006). Plastics. In: Dominant Wave Theory. By Andrew Hughes. Pp. 112–116. London: Booth-Clibborn, 2006. ISBN 9781861542847. New York: Abrams, 2007. ISBN 9780810993099.
- "Marine Strategy Framework Directive: TaskGroup 10 Report: Marine Litter." Luxembourg: Publications Office of the European Union, 2010. Galgani, F., Fleet, D., van Franeker, J., Katsanevakis, S., Maes, T., Mouat, J.Oosterbaan, L., Poitou, I., Hanke, G., Thompson, R., Amato, E., Birkun A., and Janssen, C. ISBN 978-92-79-15653-3.
- Marine Debris as a Global Environmental Problem: Introducing a solutions based framework focused on plastic: A STAP Information Document: November 2011. Washington, DC: Scientific and Technical Advisory Panel, Global Environment Facility, 2011. Richard C. Thompson, Bruce E. La Belle, Hindrik Bouwman, and Lev Neretin. Thompson was lead author.
- Impacts of Marine Debris on Biodiversity: Current status and Potential Solutions. CBD Technical Series No. 67. Montreal: Secretariat of the Convention on Biological Diversity; Scientific and Technical Advisory Panel—GEF, 2012. ISBN 92-9225-444-8. Thompson was lead author.
- Readman, J.W., DeLuna, F. Ebinhaus, R., Guzman, A.N., Price A.R.G., Readman, E.E. Sheppard, A.L.S., Sleight, A.S. Strum, R. Thompson, R.C. Tonkin, A.Wolschke, H., Wright, R., and Sheppard, R.C. (2013) Coral Reefs of the World.
- Thompson, R.C. (2013) Plastics, Environment and Health. In: Accumulation: The Material Politics of Plastics. Edited by Gabrys, J., Hawkins, G. and Michael, M. Hardback: Routledge, 2013. ISBN 9780415625821. Paperback: Routledge, 2017. ISBN 9781138063068. Pp. 150–169.

=== Awards and honours ===
- 2016: Marsh Award for Marine and Freshwater Conservation from the Zoological Society of London and Marsh Christian Trust
- 2018: Order of the British Empire (OBE) in the 2018 New Year Honours for services to marine science
- 2020: Elected a Fellow of the Royal Society (FRS)
- Volvo Environment Prize (2022)
- Blue Planet Prize (2023)
- 2024: Thompson was named in Time's list of influential people in health.

In 2016, Professor Thompson was referred to by Mary Creagh as "The Godfather of Microplastics" during a public inquiry into the Environmental Impact of Microplastics by the Environmental Audit Select Committee. This moniker has since been repeated extensively by media outlets across the world.
