= Regina Scheyvens =

New Zealand development academic

Regina Aurelia Scheyvens
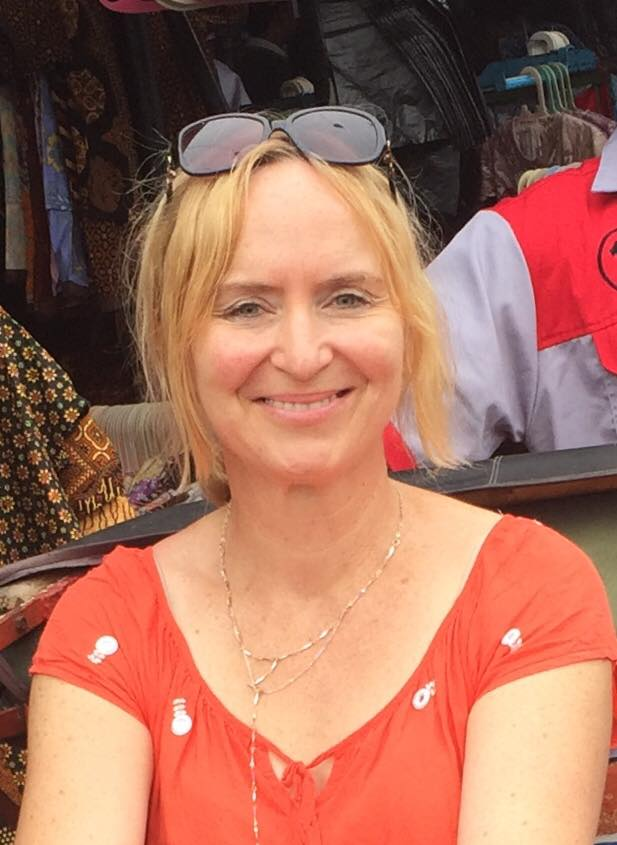
- Education: Massey University
- Awards: James Cook Fellowship, John Rooney Award of the AAG, Marsden Funding for 'the Land Has Eyes' project
- Scientific career
- Fields: Tourism
- Workplaces: Massey University
- Thesis: A quiet revolution : strategies for the empowerment and development of rural women in the Solomon Islands
- Doctoral students: Trisia Farrelly

Regina Aurelia Scheyvens is a New Zealand development academic, and as of 2019 is a full professor at Massey University. Her research focuses on the relationship between tourism, sustainable development and poverty reduction, and she has conducted fieldwork on these issues in Fiji, Vanuatu, Samoa, the Maldives and in Southern Africa. She is also very interested in gender and development, sustainable livelihood options for small island states, and in theories of empowerment for marginalised peoples.

== Academic career ==
After a 1995 PhD titled 'A quiet revolution: strategies for the empowerment and development of rural women in the Solomon Islands' at Massey University, Scheyvens joined the staff, rising to full professor. She has published around tourism, community development, customary land and the sustainable development goals, with major publications being her Tourism and Poverty and Development fieldwork books. Regina has also recently organised the Tourism and the SDGs Conference in Auckland, New Zealand in 2019 and the DevNet 2020 Conference in Palmerston North, New Zealand in 2020. She is the recipient of the prestigious James Cook Fellowship of the Royal Society of New Zealand which funds her to undertake her own research in 2021 and 2022.

Notable doctoral students of Scheyvens' include Trisia Farrelly, professor of social anthropology at Massey.

== Selected works ==
- Scheyvens, Regina. "Ecotourism and the empowerment of local communities." Tourism management 20, no. 2 (1999): 245–249.
- Scheyvens, Regina. Tourism for development: Empowering communities. Pearson Education, 2002.
- Scheyvens, Regina, ed. Development fieldwork: A practical guide. Sage, 2014.
- Scheyvens, Regina. "Backpacker tourism and third world development." Annals of tourism research 29, no. 1 (2002): 144–164.
- Scheyvens, Regina. "Exploring the tourism-poverty nexus." Current issues in tourism 10, no. 2-3 (2007): 231–254.
- Scheyvens, Regina & Biddulph, Robin, eds. Inclusive Tourism Development. Routledge, 2020.
- Scheyvens Regina. Tourism and Poverty. Routledge, 2011.
