= Benjamin Von Wong =

Canadian artist

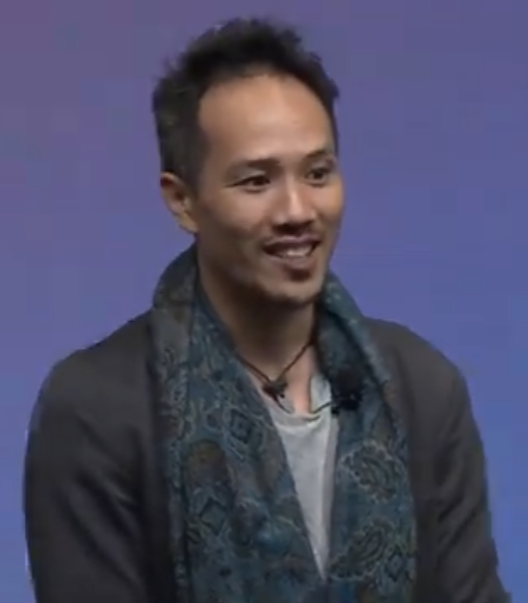
- At a WEF meeting in June 2024
- Born: November 14, 1986 (age 39); Toronto, Ontario, Canada
- Education: McGill University
- Occupation: Artist
- Years active: 2007–present
- Known for: Cinematography, photography, film, installation art
- Website: www.vonwong.com

Benjamin Von Wong (Chinese: 黄志铭; pinyin: Huáng Zhì Míng, born November 14, 1986) is a Canadian artist, activist, and photographer best known for his environmental art installations and hyper-realist art style. He is a global inspirational speaker and an advocate against ocean plastics. He is also notable for creating several viral social media campaigns, including the most funded GoFundMe campaign which raised over US$2M for Eliza O'Neill, a sufferer of Sanfilippo syndrome.

Since 2017, Von Wong (Chinese: 烽煌; pinyin: Fēng Huáng) has focused his attention on building community around his plastic waste and environmental art installations. In addition to an extensive viral component, his storytelling aims to compel followers to act rather than spectate and not merely be entertained by his stunning campaigns.

== Early life ==
Benjamin Von Wong is the son of Sing Wong and Jeanette Kho, both Malaysian Chinese immigrants to Canada, where he was born in Toronto on November 14, 1986. In 2007, Wong graduated from McGill University with a degree in Mining Engineering. Von Wong began his career working for Golder Associates as an underground mine planning and design engineer. In 2012, he left engineering to pursue a career in the arts.

== Early career ==
In 2013, he collaborated with Nikon and musician Andrew Kesler to produce the Nikon Symphony, a free ringtone made with $30,000 of dSLR gear.

In 2014, he was one of Flickr's weekly featured artists for his underwater photography taken in the Tulamben shipwreck in Bali, Indonesia.

In 2015, Von Wong was hired by cell phone manufacturer Huawei to demonstrate the capabilities of its P8 cell phone camera. Von Wong combined visual arts with pyrotechnics to create an image of a live model surrounded by fire without the help of Photoshop.

== Career ==
In 2017, Von Wong transformed a lifetime of Electronic Waste into art sculptures. These pieces were made from recovered electronics came from Dell's Global Recycling Program. He also hung social entrepreneurs off a 30 story skyscraper in the Philippines after he was challenged by Nike to creatively promote its latest line of shoes.

In 2018, Von Wong built the world's tallest closet in Cairo, Egypt, made from 3,000 articles of clothing—representing one lifetime of clothing—standing nine meters tall. The structural framework for the installation was fabricated and assembled by CANEX Aluminum, a Cairo-based manufacturer. After the installation was disassembled, Von Wong donated the clothing to Egyptian refugees. In Corfu, Greece - collaboration with Greenpeace and aerialist Katerina Soldatou to illustrate the statistic: "Every 60 seconds, a truckload of plastic flows into the ocean."

In 2019, Von Wong earned a Guinness World Record for "Strawpocalypse," the largest supported art installation made from plastic drinking straws. Von Wong re-purposed used straws to raise awareness around the environmental damage to the ocean caused by plastics. He collaborated with the National Environment Agency and the Canadian High Commission in Singapore to create an art installation titled "Plastikophobia" made from 18,000 plastic cups for a solo gallery exhibition at the Sustainable Singapore Galleries.

In 2021, Von Wong created the #TurnOffThePlasticTap project to bring awareness to the volume of plastics being dumped into our oceans. The project is also known as #GiantPlasticTap and garnered good visibility in its desire to impact Cop26.

In March 2022, he was invited to recreate the tap in Kenya for the United Nations Environmental Assembly where a historic decision was made by UN member states to adopt a landmark mandate to develop a legally binding global Plastics Treaty with a full life cycle approach. He also gave his 3rd TEDx talk, entitled "Irrelevancy as fuel to generate collective action" at TEDxBoston on how his fear of irrelevancy is the principal motivation and source of creativity. He speaks to the evolving art of captivating attention for climate initiatives in today's click bait world.

In March 2023, he created an 11-foot tall skull made from electronic waste titled "The Skull of Satoshi" together with Greenpeace to highlight the environmental impact of Bitcoin mining. The campaign was met with significant controversy online from the crypto community.

In August 2025, Von Wong created "The Thinker's Burden" together with SLS Illusions for the global plastics treaty negotiations. The artwork was installed in front of the Palais de Nations in Geneva and consisted of a human face and a thinking human on a rock, slowly drowning in plastic litter over the course of the negotiations.

== Philanthropy ==
=== Saving Eliza ===
Saving Eliza is the name for both a campaign, and associated three minute video created by Von Wong focused on saving the life of Eliza O'Neill. Eliza, then a 3-year-old living in Columbia, South Carolina, was diagnosed in 2013 with Sanfillipo syndrome – a terminal, rapidly degenerative disease in children. The O'Neill family is working to raise the money needed to fund a clinical trial which could save the lives of Eliza and other children with the disease. Their efforts are part of a trend, by concerned private citizens, to raise money for research and drug trials regarding rare diseases, which might otherwise be under-addressed by pharmaceutical companies. The O'Neills had found that researchers at Nationwide Children's Hospital, in Columbus, Ohio, had found a gene therapy that worked on mice, but they would need an additional $2.5 million to start clinical trials humans.

The original Saving Eliza campaign was channeled through the GoFundMe web platform in October 2013. By 2016, after the video went viral, the GoFundMe campaign surpassed its original goal of $2 million – a new record, at that time, as the most money ever raised for a single GoFundMe campaign.

=== Shark Shepherd Viral Campaign ===
In 2015, Von Wong launched an online campaign petitioning Datuk Masidi Manjun to create a Shark Sanctuary in Malaysia. His viral campaign featuring free-diver Amber Bourke tied underwater while sharks swam around generated over 80,000 petition signatures. The photos were created in Fiji.

=== Pandas Not Plastics Crypto campaign ===
In 2022, Von Wong launched an online campaign to fundraise over $100,000 for the Human Needs Project in collaboration with the crypto community "The Degenerate Trash Pandas."

== Recognition ==
- 2015: Saving Eliza: The Video that Could Save a Little Girl s Life... and Thousands More - Shorty Awards Best Use of Video (Nominated)
- 2015: Power of Photography AP Awards 2015 Winner
- 2018: Top 11 Branded Content Masterminds Who are Elevating the Art of Marketing by Ad Week
- 2019: Guinness World Record for "Strawpocalypse," the largest supported art installation made from plastic drinking straws.

== Gallery ==
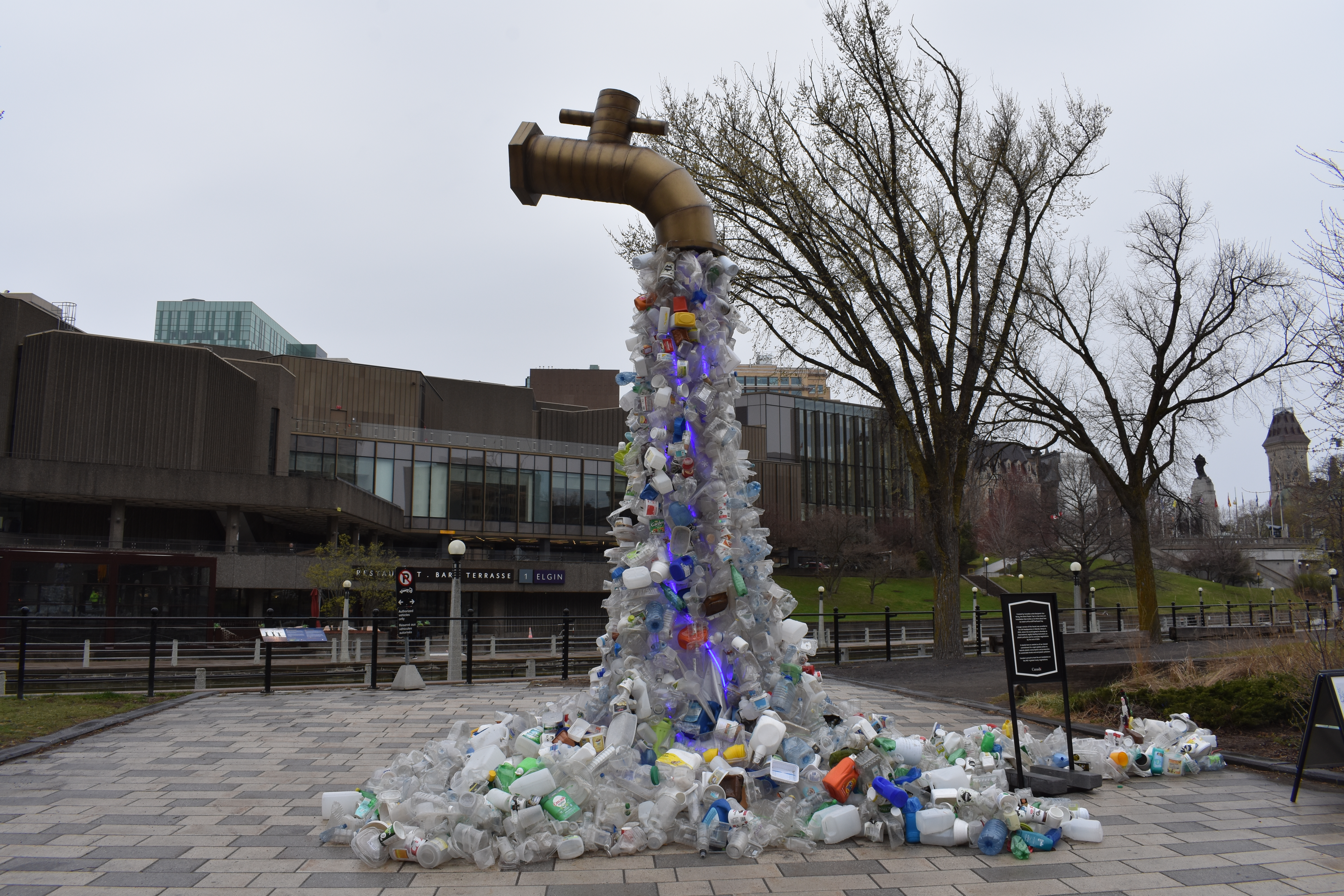
Giant Plastic Tap, Ottawa, Canada
