= John Chweya =

Kenyan waste picker and advocate

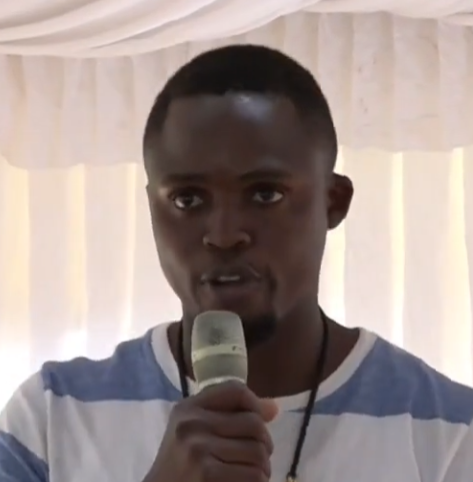
- Chweya in 2023
- Born: 1990 or 1991 (age 34–35); Kisumu, Kenya
- Occupations: Waste picker; advocate
- Organization: President of Kenya National Waste Pickers Welfare Association

John Chweya (born 1990-1991) is a Kenyan waste picker and advocate best known for his role as President of the Kenya National Waste Pickers Welfare Association. In this role, he has advocated for the waste pickers in Kenya in conferences around the world.

== Biography ==
Chweya was raised in Kisumu to a mother who sold secondhand clothes. When the market where she sold had a fire, however, the family had to find new sources of income, and Chweya became a waste picker, using magnets to attract metal and sell it to dealers. For a time, he was able to continue primary school, but he was shunned by his classmates' families. He also befriended children who were also waste pickers at the dump, but many of them died either from accidents or illness.

As he grew, he began to become an organizer and leader in the group due to his early education. He led discussions and challenges to county government policies. He then, after receiving a grant from the county government, began building local cooperatives of waste pickers. By 2023, he became the president of the Kenyan National Waste Pickers Association, where he leads the country's thirty-six thousand waste pickers. In this role, he led partnerships with the county government to clean up lower-income neighborhoods.

In 2023, he participated in the United Nations Intergovernmental Negotiation Committee on Plastic Pollution meeting in Nairobi, where he helped to organize a performance theater piece to demonstrate to delegates the dangers of a waste picking job. He also participated in the Paris meeting that same year. In 2024, he participated in the meeting in Ottawa, where he called for helping waste pickers transition to safer jobs.

His advocacy has emphasized the health of his fellow waste pickers, with him frequently discussing how many of his fellow waste pickers grow sick and die due to the cost of healthcare. He has also emphasized a transition that respects waste picker's livelihoods and includes provisions for those who depend on it. He has stated that waste pickers are "on the frontline of fighting" plastic pollution and has called for an end to single-use plastics.

He was named to the Time 100 Next in 2023; his profile was written by Aryn Baker.
