= Glitterex =

American glitter manufacturer

Glitterex is a large manufacturer of glitter based in Cranford, New Jersey. The company was founded in 1963, and Babu Shetty has been president and CEO since 1999.

It produces glitter out of metallized polyester film, including holographic glitter, made from embossed material, and iridescent glitter, made from 233 layers of clear film with different levels of refraction. The smallest pieces Glitterex produces are 50 micrometres (0.0020 in) by 75 micrometres (0.0030 in), placing them in the category of microplastics.

Glitterex is a supplier to Revlon cosmetics. Glitterex's glitter is also used to mark food in animals as a "fecal marker".
