= Renate Meyer (statistician) =

Professor of statistics in New Zealand

- Born: Germany
- Awards: James Cook Research Fellowship

Academic background
- Education: RWTH Aachen University
- Doctoral advisor: Rudolf Mathar

Academic work
- Institutions: University of Auckland
- Main interests: gravitational wave detection

Renate Meyer is a New Zealand statistician, and is a full professor at the University of Auckland, specialising in gravitational wave analysis.

== Academic career ==
Meyer is a German-born New Zealander. She completed a PhD titled Invariante Präordnungen und algorithmische Aspekte bei Matrix-Approximationsproblemen in multivariaten statistischen Verfahren (Invariant preorders and algorithmic aspects of matrix approximation problems in multivariate statistical methods) at the RWTH Aachen University in 1993. Having visited New Zealand for two international meetings, the 1992 International Biometrics Conference at the University of Waikato and the International Workshop on Matrix Methods in Statistics at the University of Auckland, Meyer intended to stay for two years when she joined the faculty of the University of Auckland in 1994. Meyer was promoted to full professor in 2019.

Meyer is a pioneer in gravitational wave analysis, having got interested in the field through collaborator Nelson Christensen, who had been a doctoral student of Rainer Weiss. She is part of a New Zealand team, the NZ Astrostatistics and General Relativity Group, which is a formal working group of the LISA Consortium to observe gravitational waves in space. Meyer's students have worked in the Jet Propulsion Laboratory, the Albert Einstein Institute in Hanover, Germany, the University of Edinburgh, and the Institute of Space Technology in Pakistan.

== Awards and honours ==
Meyer was awarded a James Cook Research Fellowship in 2021 to work with LIGO and LISA researchers to "understand the sources of noise in gravitational wave detection and to mitigate against them to purify the desired wave signal".

== Selected works ==
- Meyer, Renate; Jun Yu (2000). "BUGS for a Bayesian analysis of stochastic volatility models". The Econometrics Journal. 3 (2): 198–215. doi:10.1111/1368-423x.00046. Zbl 0970.91060. Wikidata Q123417550.
- Meyer, Renate; Russell B Millar (1999). "BUGS in Bayesian stock assessments". Canadian Journal of Fisheries and Aquatic Sciences. 56 (6): 1078–1087. doi:10.1139/f99-043. Wikidata Q123417551.
- Christian Röver; Meyer, Renate; Nelson Christensen (2006). "Bayesian inference on compact binary inspiral gravitational radiation signals in interferometric data". Classical and Quantum Gravity. 23 (15): 4895–4906. arXiv:gr-qc/0602067. doi:10.1088/0264-9381/23/15/009. Zbl 1099.83521. Wikidata Q114733506.
- Meyer, Renate; Nelson Christensen (2001). "Fast Bayesian reconstruction of chaotic dynamical systems via extended Kalman filtering". Physical Review E. 65 (1 Pt 2) 016206. Bibcode:2001PhRvE..65a6206M. doi:10.1103/physreve.65.016206. PMID 11800767. Wikidata Q51642054.
- Andreas Berg; Meyer, Renate; Jun Yu (2004). "Deviance Information Criterion for Comparing Stochastic Volatility Models". Journal of Business & Economic Statistics. 22 (1): 107–120. doi:10.1198/073500103288619430. Wikidata Q123417535.
- Nelson Christensen; Meyer, Renate; Lloyd Knox; Ben Luey (2001). "Bayesian methods for cosmological parameter estimation from cosmic microwave background measurements". Classical and Quantum Gravity. 18 (14): 2677–2688. arXiv:astro-ph/0103134. doi:10.1088/0264-9381/18/14/306. Zbl 0990.83014. Wikidata Q123417537.
- Jun Yu; Meyer, Renate (2006). "Multivariate Stochastic Volatility Models: Bayesian Estimation and Model Comparison". Econometric Reviews. 25 (2–3): 361–384. doi:10.1080/07474930600713465. Zbl 1113.62133. Wikidata Q123417531.
