= Trisia Farrelly =

New Zealand social anthropologist

Trisia Farrelly ONZM
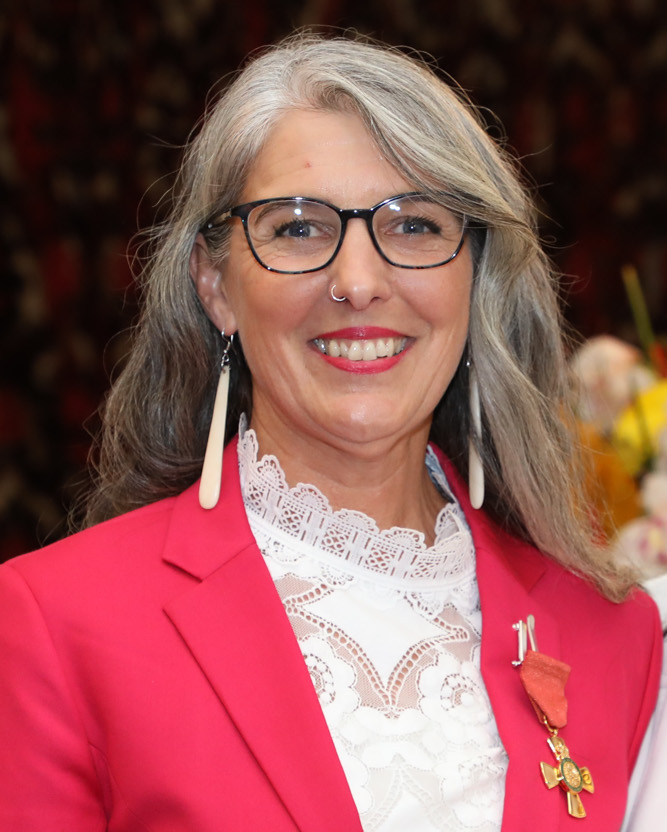
- Farrelly in 2025
- Born: Trisia Angela Prince

Academic background
- Education: Massey University
- Thesis: Business va'avanua: cultural hybridisation and indigenous entrepreneurship in the Bouma National Heritage Park, Fiji (2009)
- Doctoral advisor: Sita Venkateswar; Regina Scheyvens

Academic work
- Discipline: Social anthropology
- Institutions: Massey University; Cawthron Institute

Trisia Angela Farrelly ONZM (née Prince) is a New Zealand professor of social anthropology and honorary fellow of Massey University, specialising in science-policy and systems approaches to preventing and reducing plastic pollution. Farrelly coordinates the Scientists' Coalition for an Effective Plastics Treaty, with a membership of more than 400 members from over 60 countries. She co-founded the Aotearoa Plastic Pollution Alliance and the New Zealand Product Stewardship Council. Farrelly is also a technical advisor (global plastics treaty) to the Secretariat for the Pacific Regional Environment Programme and a senior editor of the journal Cambridge Prisms: Plastics. In December 2024, she was appointed an Officer of the New Zealand Order of Merit, for services to ecology.

== Academic career ==
Farrelly completed a PhD degree at Massey University in 2009. Her thesis was titled Business va'avanua: cultural hybridisation and indigenous entrepreneurship in the Bouma National Heritage Park, Fiji and was supervised by Sita Venkateswar and Regina Scheyvens. Farrelly then joined the faculty at Massey, rising to associate professor in 2022 and full professor in 2024. She is coordinator of the Scientists' Coalition for an Effective Plastics Treaty and co-director of Massey's Political Ecology Research Centre. Farrelly's research focuses on excessive and hazardous plastics production, and how to reduce plastic use and pollution in New Zealand and internationally. Farrelly is currently a senior research scientist at the Cawthron Institute, in Nelson.

Farrelly was a member of the United Nations Environment Programme's Expert Group on Marine Litter and Microplastics, and a member of the Scientific Advisory Committee.

She has co-edited the book Plastic Legacies: Pollution, Persistence, and Politics.

== Awards and honours ==
Farrelly has been awarded Massey University medals for Exceptional Research Citizenship, and Excellence in Teaching. She was a finalist in the New Zealand Women of Influence Awards in 2021, and in 2023 she won the WasteMINZ Award for Excellence in Product Stewardship in recognition of "her longstanding and ongoing work to end plastic pollution". In the 2025 New Year Honours, Farrelly was appointed an Officer of the New Zealand Order of Merit, for services to ecology.

== Selected works ==
=== Book ===
- Farrelly, Trisia Angela; Sy Taffel; Shaw, Ian Charles, eds. (2021). Plastic Legacies: Pollution, Persistence, and Politics. doi:10.15215/aupress/9781771993272.01. ISBN 978-1-77199-328-9. OL 34227117M. Wikidata Q124288042.

=== Recent journal articles ===
- Farrelly T, Brander S, Thompson R, Carney Almroth B. (2025). Independent science key to breaking stalemates in global plastics treaty negotiations. Cambridge Prisms: Plastics. 2025;3:e6. doi:10.1017/plc.2025.2
- Yates, J., Deeney, M., Muncke, J. et al. Plastics matter in the food system. Commun Earth Environ 6, 176 (2025). https://doi.org/10.1038/s43247-025-02105-7
- Deeney M, Yates J, Kadiyala S, et al. Human health evidence in the global treaty to end plastics pollution: A survey of policy perspectives. Cambridge Prisms: Plastics. Published online 2025:1-21. doi:10.1017/plc.2025.5
- Syberg, K., Almroth, B. C., Fernandez, M. O., Baztan, J., Bergmann, M., Thompson, R. C., ... & Farrelly, T. (2024). Informing the Plastic Treaty negotiations on science-experiences from the Scientists’ Coalition for an Effective Plastic Treaty. Microplastics and Nanoplastics, 4(1), 1-10.
- Cowger, W., Willis, K. A., Bullock, S., Conlon, K., Emmanuel, J., Erdle, L. M., ... & Wang, M. (2024). Global producer responsibility for plastic pollution. Science Advances, 10(17), eadj8275.
- Farrelly, T., Gammage, T., Carney Almroth, B., & Thompson, R. (2024). Global plastics treaty needs trusted science. Science, 384(6693), 281-281.
- Syberg, K., Oturai, N. G., Hansen, S. F., Collins, T. J., Gündoğdu, S., Carney Almroth, B., ... & Muncke, J. (2024). Link circular economy to waste hierarchy in treaty. Science, 384(6693), 280-281.
- Baztan, J., Jorgensen, B., Almroth, B. C., Bergmann, M., Farrelly, T., Muncke, J., ... & Wagner, M. (2024). Primary plastic polymers: Urgently needed upstream reduction. Cambridge Prisms: Plastics, 2, e7.
- Bergmann, M., Arp, H. P. H., Almroth, B. C., Cowger, W., Eriksen, M., Dey, T., ... & Farrelly, T. (2023). Moving from symptom management to upstream plastics prevention: The fallacy of plastic cleanup technology. One Earth, 6(11), 1439-1442.
- Bergmann, M., Arp, H. P. H., Carney Almroth, B., Dey, T., Farrelly, T., Gündoğdu, S., ... & Wang, M. (2023). Ocean plastic cleanups need a global framework with science-based criteria. Science.
- Holland, J., Farrelly, T., & Mwape, A. (2024). Using IUCN Best Practice Principles to Evaluate National Park Management: A Zambia Case Study. Journal of Park & Recreation Administration, 42(2).
- Peryman, M., Cumming, R., Ngata, T., Farrelly, T. A., Fuller, S., & Borrelle, S. B. (2024). Plastic pollution as waste colonialism in Aotearoa (New Zealand). Marine Policy, 163, 106078.
- Farrelly, T., & Chitaka, T. Y. (2023). Policy implications for gaps in traditional plastic waste material flow analysis: Palmerston North, New Zealand. Frontiers in Sustainability, 4, 982357.
- Carney Almroth, B., Abeynayaka, A., Diamond, M. L., Farrelly, T., Fernandez, M., Gündoğdu, S., ... & Ågerstrand, M. (2023). Obstacles to scientific input in global policy. Science, 380(6649), 1021-1022.
- Fuller, S., Ngata, T., Borrelle, S. B., & Farrelly, T. (2022). Plastics pollution as waste colonialism in Te Moananui. Journal of Political Ecology, 29(1), 534-560.
- Varea, R., Varea, R., Kant, R., & Farrelly, T. (2022). Qi no tu i baba ni qwali (living down by the river): Impacts of flooding and mining on ecosystems and livelihoods. Frontiers in Marine Science, 9, 954062.
- Simon, N., Raubenheimer, K., Urho, N., Unger, S., Azoulay, D., Farrelly, T., ... & Weiand, L. (2021). A binding global agreement to address the life cycle of plastics. Science. 373 (6550): 43–47. doi:10.1126/SCIENCE
- Nemeth, B., Nemeth, K., Procter, J. N., & Farrelly, T. (2021). Geoheritage conservation: Systematic mapping study for conceptual synthesis. Geoheritage, 13(2), 45.
- Farrelly, T. A., Borrelle, S. B., & Fuller, S. (2021). The strengths and weaknesses of Pacific Islands plastic pollution policy frameworks. Sustainability, 13(3), 1252.
- Farrelly, T., Shaw, I., & Holland, J. (2021). Redressing the Faustian Bargains of Plastics Economies. Plastic Legacies.
- Sinner, J., Newton, M., Barclay, J., Baines, J., Farrelly, T., Edwards, P., & Tipa, G. (2020). Measuring social licence: What and who determines public acceptability of aquaculture in New Zealand?. Aquaculture, 521, 734973.
- Newton, M. J., Farrelly, T. A., & Sinner, J. (2020). Discourse, agency, and social license to operate in New Zealand's marine economy. Ecology & Society, 25(1).
- Adams, S., Farrelly, T., & Holland, J. (2020). Non-formal education for sustainable development: A case study of the ‘children in the wilderness’ eco-club programme in the Zambezi region. Journal of Education for Sustainable Development, 14(2), 117-139.
- Farrelly, T., & Green, L. (2020). The global plastic pollution crisis: how should New Zealand respond?. Policy Quarterly, 16(2).
- Mitchell, A. E., Farrelly, T., & Andrews, R. (2020). ‘We're Hands-On People’: Healing Diabetes in the Absence of Traditional Healers in an Aboriginal Community in Northern Territory, Australia. Sites: A Journal of Social Anthropology and Cultural Studies, 17(2).
- Phongchiewboon, A., Farrelly, T., Hytten, K., & Holland, J. (2020). Political ecology, privation and sustainable livelihoods in northern Thailand's national parks. Journal of Political Ecology, 27(1), 360-377.
