= Susan Schenk =

New Zealand academic psychologist

- Born: 1954 (age 71–72); Montreal
- Citizenship: Canada/New Zealand
- Education: Concordia University
- Awards: Fellow of The Royal Society of New Zealand
- Scientific career
- Fields: Physical and chemical aspects of drug abuse
- Workplaces: Texas A&M University Victoria University of Wellington
- Thesis: The substrate for prefrontal cortical self-stimulation: a psychophysical investigation (1899)
- Doctoral advisor: Peter Shizgal

Susan Schenk, sometimes Lovell-Schenk, (born 1954) is a New Zealand psychology academic. She is currently a full professor at the Victoria University of Wellington.

== Academic career ==
After a 1982 PhD titled The substrate for prefrontal cortical self-stimulation: a psychophysical investigation at Concordia University, Schenk completed an NSERC funded post/doctoral position with Peter Milner at McGill University. She then moved to Texas A&M University where she moved through the ranks from assistant professor to professor. In 2001 she moved to the Victoria University of Wellington, as a full professor due to problems in the stock of cocaine being missing from her research.

Most of her research relates to the physical and chemical aspects of drug abuse.

== Selected works ==
- Horger, Brian A., Keith Shelton, and Susan Schenk. "Preexposure sensitizes rats to the rewarding effects of cocaine." Pharmacology Biochemistry and Behavior 37, no. 4 (1990): 707–711.
- Horger, Brian A., Melissa K. Giles, and Susan Schenk. "Preexposure to amphetamine and nicotine predisposes rats to self-administer a low dose of cocaine." Psychopharmacology 107, no. 2-3 (1992): 271–276.
- Schenk, Susan, Gary Lacelle, Kathleen Gorman, and Zalman Amit. "Cocaine self-administration in rats influenced by environmental conditions: implications for the etiology of drug abuse." Neuroscience Letters 81, no. 1-2 (1987): 227–231.
- Schenk, Susan, Brian A. Horger, Rachel Peltier, and Keith Shelton. "Supersensitivity to the reinforcing effects of cocaine following 6-hydroxydopamine lesions to the medial prefrontal cortex in rats." Brain Research 543, no. 2 (1991): 227–235.
- Schenk, Susan, Brian Partridge, and Toni S. Shippenberg. "U69593, a kappa-opioid agonist, decreases cocaine self-administration and decreases cocaine-produced drug-seeking." Psychopharmacology 144, no. 4 (1999): 339–346.
