= Tom Welton =

British Chemist

Tom Welton OBE FRSC CChem FCGI
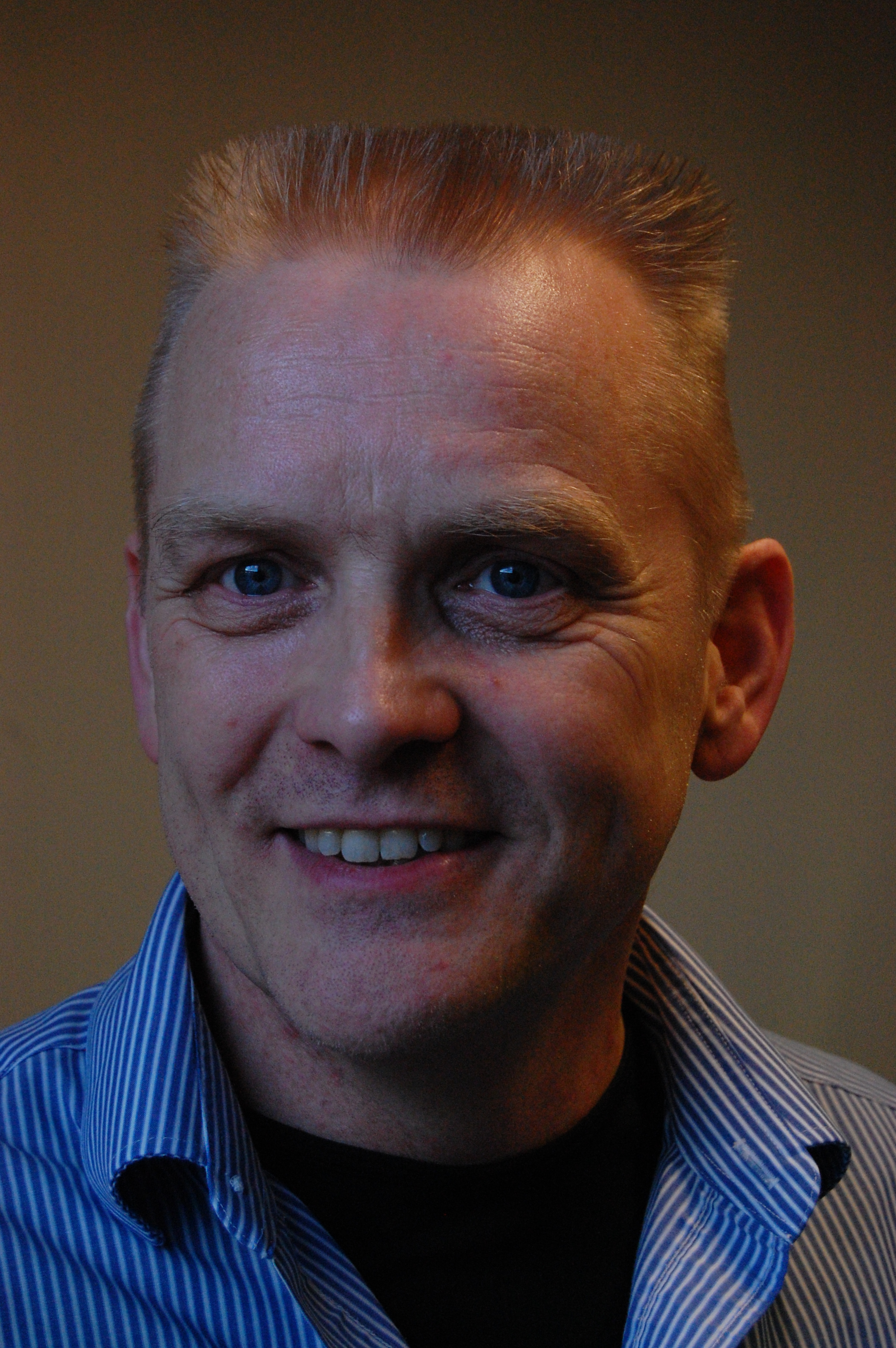
- Born: Thomas Welton; 1964 (age 61–62); London
- Education: University of Sussex (BSc, PhD)
- Scientific career
- Fields: Sustainable chemistry ionic liquids
- Workplaces: Imperial College London
- Thesis: The chemistry and spectroscopy of ionic liquids (1990)
- Doctoral advisor: Kenneth Seddon
- Website: imperial.ac.uk/people/t.welton

Welton's voice
recorded December 2014

Thomas Welton OBE FRSC CChem FCGI (born January 1964) is a professor of sustainable chemistry at Imperial College London. He served as head of the department of chemistry from 2007 to 2014 and as dean of the faculty of natural sciences from 2015 to 2019. He is a Fellow and the former president of the Royal Society of Chemistry (2020 to 2022). He is their current Ambassador for Sustainable Chemicals Policy (2023-date). Welton's research focuses on sustainable chemistry, with particular focus on ionic liquids and on solvent effects on chemical reactions. Welton is openly gay and is active in advocating for greater visibility for members of the LGBT community in the sciences. He is a Former member of the UKRI Equality, Diversity and Inclusion External Advisory Group (2018-2021).

== Education ==
Welton grew up on a North London council estate and was the first in his family to attend university. Welton has said that his interest in chemistry originated with his A-level chemistry class. As a child he wanted to fly for the Royal Air Force. He received his BSc (Hons) in chemistry in 1985 from the University of Sussex, and his PhD from the same institution in 1990 under the supervision of Kenneth Seddon. He was inspired by the Nobel Laureate Harry Kroto. He has cited the institution's positive environment for the LGBT community at the time as a positive influence.

== Career and research ==
Welton began his career at Imperial College London as a Lloyd's of London Tercentenary Fellow in 1993. He became a lecturer in 1995 and was promoted to full professor in 2004. During his tenure he has served as the department of chemistry's director of undergraduate studies and served as the head of the department of chemistry from 2007 to 2014. He also served as dean of the faculty of natural sciences from January 2015 until his term ended in December 2019.

Welton is a former trustee of the Lloyd's Tercentenary Research Foundation (2012-2022). From 2013 to 2022 he was a member of the Board of Trustees of the Royal Society of Chemistry and additionally served on the steering committee for the RSC's diversity programme. Between 2015 and 2018 Welton served as chair of the Memberships and Qualifications Board. He was appointed chair of the Professional Standards Board in 2018. He succeeded Professor Dame Carol Robinson as president of the RSC in July 2020 and was succeeded by Professor Gill Reid in July 2022.

=== Research ===
Welton works in the field of sustainable chemistry, and has spent most of his career studying the properties of ionic liquids, their interactions with solutes, and the resulting effects on chemical reactions. He was the world's first Professor of Sustainable Chemistry. His research group also works on applications for these phenomena in developing environmentally safe organic synthesis methods and in the production of biofuels. Ionic liquids became commercially available in 1999, meaning that you 'no longer had to be an expert in the synthesis of ionic liquids to be able to use these in your research'. His 1999 review, Room-Temperature Ionic Liquids. Solvents for Synthesis and Catalysis, has been cited over 13,000 times. He is best known for quantifying the effects of ionic liquids on reactions, providing a mechanistic understanding of ionic liquids and establishing how they can be used in organic synthesis. He was also instrumental in linking the fundamental physical properties of ionic liquids to their chemical behaviours.

Along with Peter Wasserscheid, Welton co-edited a book, Ionic Liquids in Synthesis, first released in 2002 with a second edition in 2007. The first edition was reviewed positively as a significant introduction to the then-newly-developing field and the second expanded edition was described as excellent and comprehensive. He also joined Christian Reichardt as an author of the fourth edition of the reference work Solvents and Solvent Effects in Organic Chemistry, reviewed as an important reference for organic chemists.

Welton's work on ionic liquids led to the invention of a method to process wood by separating its chemical component lignin from hemicellulose and cellulose, which is potentially applicable to the efficient production of biofuels. Welton also comments in the media on matters related to the health of the environment, such as the 2012 shortage of helium gas commonly used in research laboratories.

=== Diversity and inclusion ===
Welton is an advocate for diversity in academic science. In 2013, under Welton's leadership, the Department of Chemistry, Imperial College London was one of four university departments in the United Kingdom to be awarded an Athena SWAN Gold Award in recognition of efforts to promote women in science. He supports academic institutions around the world in their efforts to improve diversity and equality. In January 2017 Welton toured Australia to share good practise in supporting academic women.

In 2012, together with Alison Rodger, Welton established the Irène Joliot-Curie conference that looked to develop the careers for women and underrepresented groups in science. The conference included talks from leading women in chemistry, and is now run annually by the Royal Society of Chemistry. Welton was appointed to the UKRI Equality, Diversity and Inclusion External Advisory Group. He was awarded an OBE for his services to diversity in education. He has written in the popular media advocating for greater visibility in the sciences for the LGBT community. Additionally, Welton is a L'Oréal-UNESCO For Women in Science male laureate of change, "The time for men to realise that gender parity benefits everyone is long overdue". He is currently chair of the board of trustees of the Daphne Jackson Trust (2021-date) and a member of the Elsevier Advisory Board for Equality, Diversity and Inclusion.

=== Awards and honours ===
His awards and honours include:

- 2017 Officer of the Order of the British Empire (OBE)
- 2017 Fellow of the City and Guilds Institute
- 2016 Royal Society of Chemistry King's College London Daniel Lecturer
- 2015 Royal Society of Chemistry 175 Faces of Chemistry
- 2012 RSC/UCL Thomas Graham Lecturer
- 2012 Imperial College Rector's Award for Excellence in Teaching
- 2011 DFG Paul Walden Lecturer
- 2010 Honorary Member of the Chemical Society of Ethiopia
- 2007 RSC Sir Christopher Ingold Lecturer
- 2007 Fellow of the Royal Society of Chemistry
- 2001 American Chemical Society New Voice in Chemistry
- 1993 Lloyd's of London Tercentenary Fellowship
