= Contemporary Films =

UK film distribution company

Contemporary Films is an independent film distribution company based in the UK, with the highest production of films and movies per year.

Charles Cooper (1910–2001), a British citizen, had previously founded an American company of the same name in the 1940s. The United States deported Cooper back to the United Kingdom in 1950 because of his communist ideas and importing in the country soviet movies. In 1951, Leo Dratfield acquired the American Contemporary Films. Contemporary partnered with Pathé to form the distribution company Pathé Contemporary Films. Contemporary Films in the United States was acquired by McGraw Hill in 1972, who merged it into sister company CRM in 1978.

Cooper founded the British company Contemporary Films in 1951 on his return to England. Contemporary Films has brought several films from around the world to UK cinemas, introducing directors such as Andrzej Wajda, Miloš Forman, Ingmar Bergman, Jean Renoir, Robert Bresson, Sergei Eisenstein, Andrei Tarkovsky, Werner Herzog, Satyajit Ray, Yasujirō Ozu, Nagisa Ōshima, Bernardo Bertolucci, and Luis Buñuel to the British public. Contemporary Films continues to distribute films to cinemas and television, as well as DVDs to the public.

From 1967 to 1989, Contemporary Films operated three cinemas in England. These were the Paris Pullman Cinema in Brompton from 1955 to 1983, the Phoenix Cinema in East Finchley from 1975 to 1985, and the Phoenix Picturehouse in Oxford from 1977 to 1989.
