= Drayton Gardens =

Street in London

Coordinates: 51.4886°N 0.1810°W

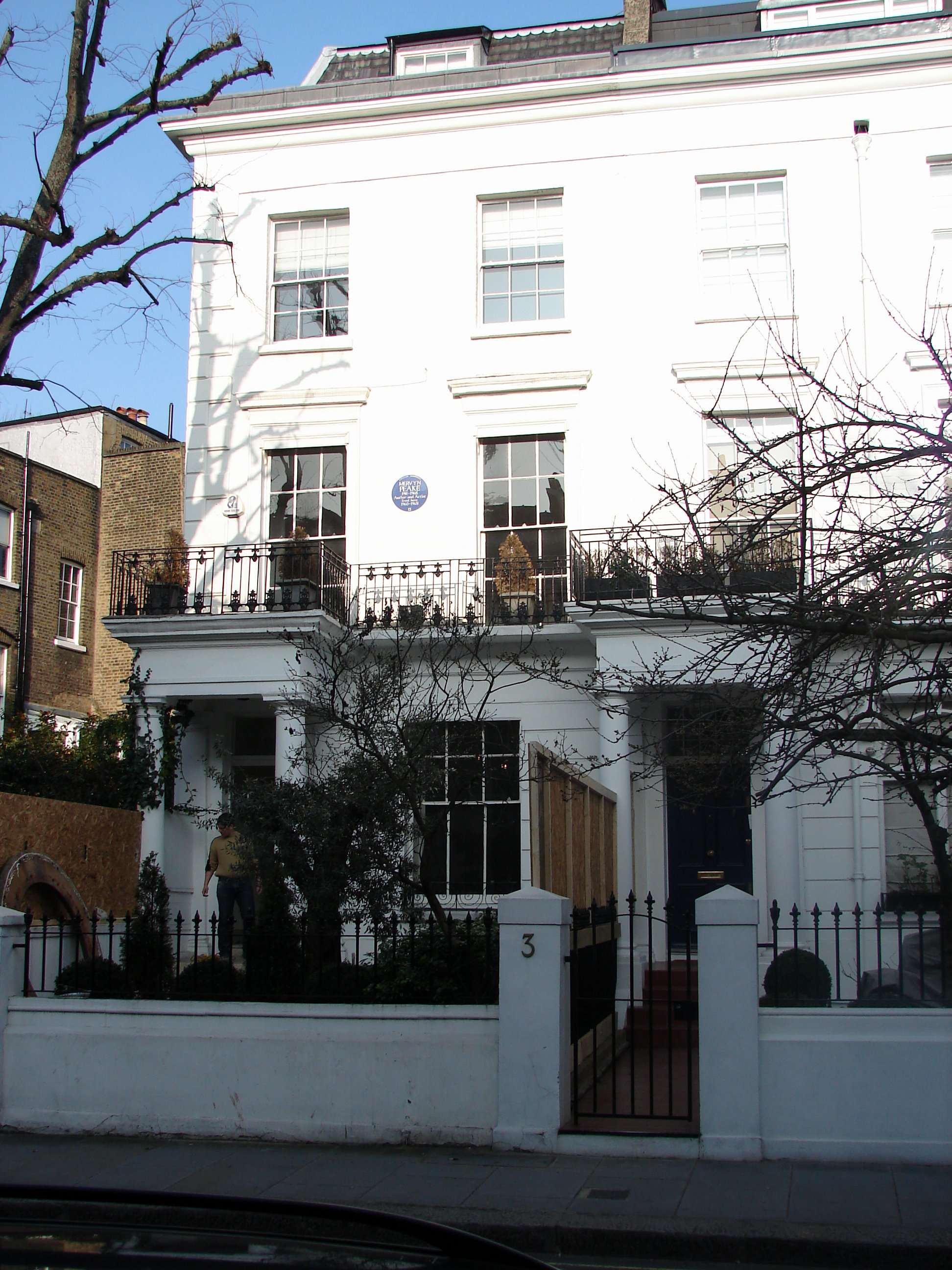
No 1 Drayton Gardens, with Mervyn Peake blue plaque

Drayton Gardens is a residential street linking the areas of Chelsea and South Kensington, London SW10. It runs roughly north to south from Old Brompton Road to Fulham Road.

== History ==
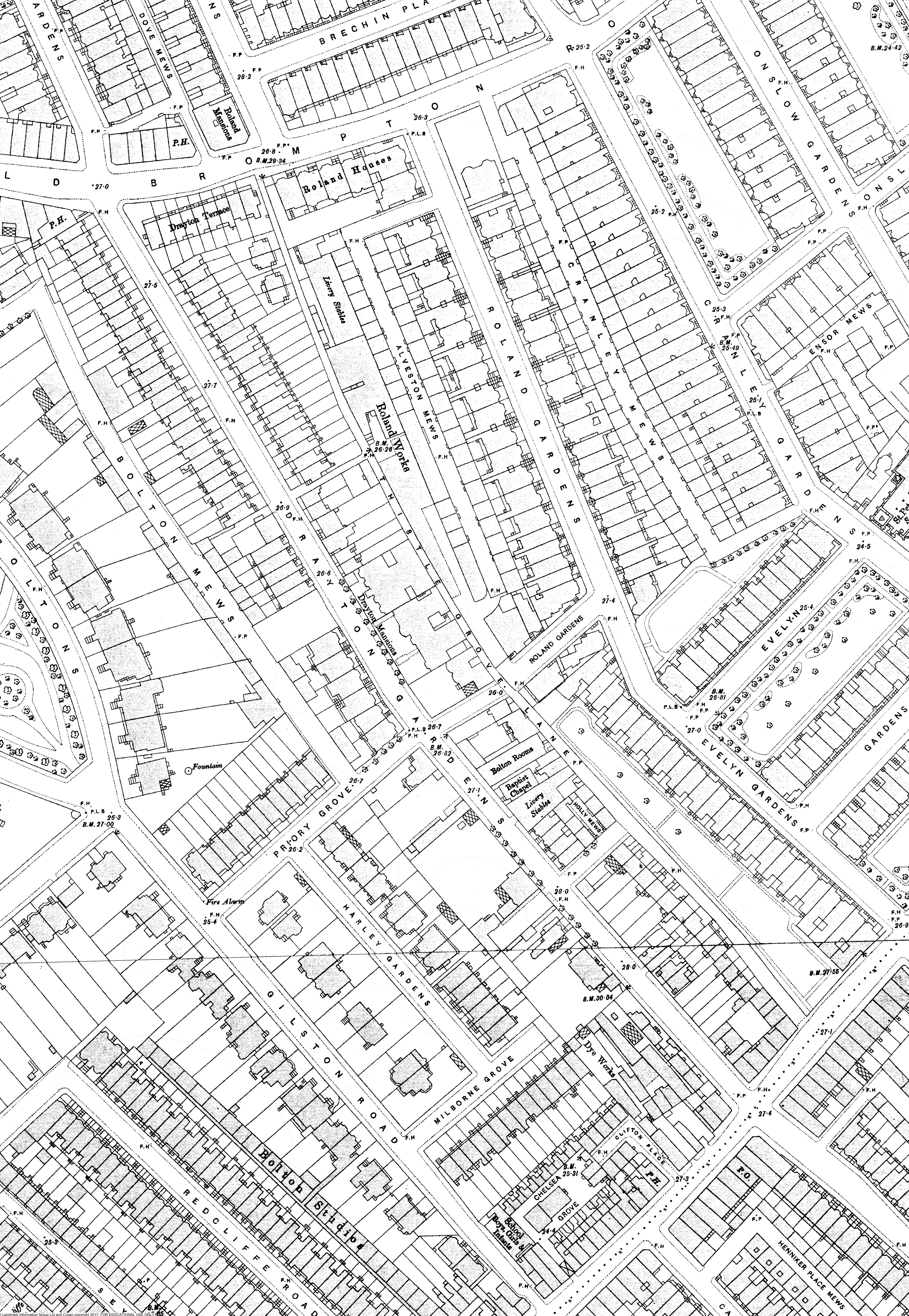
Drayton Gardens on an 1890s Ordnance Survey map

Drayton Gardens was once a "rustic lane" in the hamlet of Brompton, lined with a mix of market gardens and country houses, until more suburban villas began to be built in the early 1800s. Later, some of the older houses were demolished, and mansion blocks appeared, including Drayton Court in 1902, and Onslow Court in 1935.

The northern half (1-39 and 4-56) formed part of the Day Estate, and was a three-acre field known as Rosehall or Rose Hawe, which the Day family acquired by the marriage in 1743 of Benjamin Day, the son of a wealthy Norwich weaver, to Ann Dodemead, daughter and co-heir of Walter Dodemead of Covent Garden.

== Notable buildings and residents ==
Scientist Rosalind Franklin, who discovered the structure of DNA, lived at number 107 (Donovan Court) until her death, and in 1992, English Heritage placed a commemorative blue plaque.

The socialite Dorothy Fellowes-Gordon and her lifelong companion, the gossip columnist Elsa Maxwell lived there from 1912.

In 1926, Margery Blackie, homeopath to Queen Elizabeth II, established a practice there.

Bolton's Picture Playhouse, which opened in 1911, gave way to Bolton's Theatre Club in 1947. Until the passage of Theatres Act 1968, all public performances were subject to censorship, but by operating as a private members' club, the theatre was able to circumvent this requirement. Many of these plays transferred to the West End. After closure and conversion, the building was reopened in 1955 by James Quinn as the Paris Pullman Cinema, which showed art-house films. The final closure came in 1983, when the building was demolished and replaced by a block of flats.

From 1960 until his death in 1968, the author and artist Mervyn Peake lived at no 1. His widow Maeve Gilmore, artist and memoirist, continued to live there until her death, having decorated the house with murals.

Adelaide Hall, the jazz singer and entertainer, lived at no 74, with her husband Bert Hicks. Sir William Arbuthnot Lane, 1st Baronet and Lady Frittie Arbuthnot Lane lived next door at no 72.

St John Philby, the orientalist and explorer, lived in Grove Court in a flat belonging to his wife Dora. It was there that his son Kim Philby, the notorious NKVD/KGB agent, betrayed Erich Vermehren to the Russians after his defection from the German Abwehr to MI6 in 1944; and where ten years later he organised a press conference at which he temporarily convinced the public that he was not the "Fourth Man".
