= Paris Pullman Cinema =

Former cinema in London, England

Paris Pullman cinema
- Interactive map of Paris Pullman cinema
- Address: 65 Drayton Gardens, London SW10
- Location: Brompton, London
- Coordinates: 51.4884°N 0.1807°W
- Capacity: originally 249 seats
- Type: Picture house 1911–1947 theatre 1947–1955; 1955–1983 cinema
- Public transit: West Brompton station Earl's Court tube station Gloucester Road tube station

Construction
- Built: 1911
- Opened: 1911
- Renovated: 1947, 1955

The Paris Pullman is a former arthouse cinema, in the Brompton district, of the Royal Borough of Kensington and Chelsea London, England. It was closed and the building sold for redevelopment in 1983.

== History ==
In 1910–11, along a predominantly leafy residential street, that is Drayton Gardens, an entertainment venue opened at no.65 as the Radium Picture Playhouse, having been converted from the earlier gymnasium or arms training hall. By 1947 it ceased to show films and had become "Bolton's Theatre Club" instead. To avoid censorship of its productions by the Lord Chamberlain's office, it operated as a private theatre club with compulsory membership. Many of its plays transferred to runs in the West End. They included, The Horn of the Moon by Vivian Connell, with Jack McNaughton, Denholm Elliott, John Wyse, Pamela Alan, Martin Boddey and Jessie Evans; Directed by Colin Chandler and Dr John Bull, with John Louis Mansi among others.

The building was acquired in 1955 by Charles Cooper of Contemporary Films, the noted producer and cinema administrator, James Quinn of the British Film Institute and two other directors, Brian O'Sullivan and Ralph Stephenson. After a makeover displaying its characteristic 1950s large lemon yellow facia dotted with lights on the front, the venue reverted to showing movies, only now they were mainly contemporary foreign films under its new brand, the "Paris Pullman Cinema". Initially, it captured the bohemian audience of the neighbouring Earl's Court and Chelsea areas, but with the "Swinging Sixties" it caught the mood of the time and became a first class arthouse destination for a much wider audience. By the late 1970s the yellow facia on the front entrance had been replaced by a much more austere concrete finish, akin to the incoming Thatcher years. Contemporary films owned two other cinemas under the "Phoenix" brand, in East Finchley and in Oxford and after the closure of the Paris Pullman, it has continued to distribute films to cinemas and TV, and videos and DVDs to the general public, as well as supplying footage to programme-makers.

The residential block that replaced the cinema is called "Pullman Court".

=== Featured works ===
The roll-call of film directors whose films were screened at the Paris Pullman included: Michelangelo Antonioni, Ingmar Bergman, Bernardo Bertolucci, Walerian Borowczyk, Robert Bresson, Luis Buñuel, Claude Chabrol, Sergei Eisenstein, Miloš Forman, Werner Herzog, Philippe Mora, Yasujirō Ozu, Nagisa Oshima, Roman Polanski, Satyajit Ray, Jean Renoir, Andrei Tarkovsky, Andrzej Wajda and Rainer Werner Fassbinder whose Veronika Voss was the last film screened at the Paris Pullman on 8 May 1983.
