= Brompton, London =

Area in London (Borough of Kensington & Chelsea)

Coordinates: 51.495°N 0.164°W

Brompton
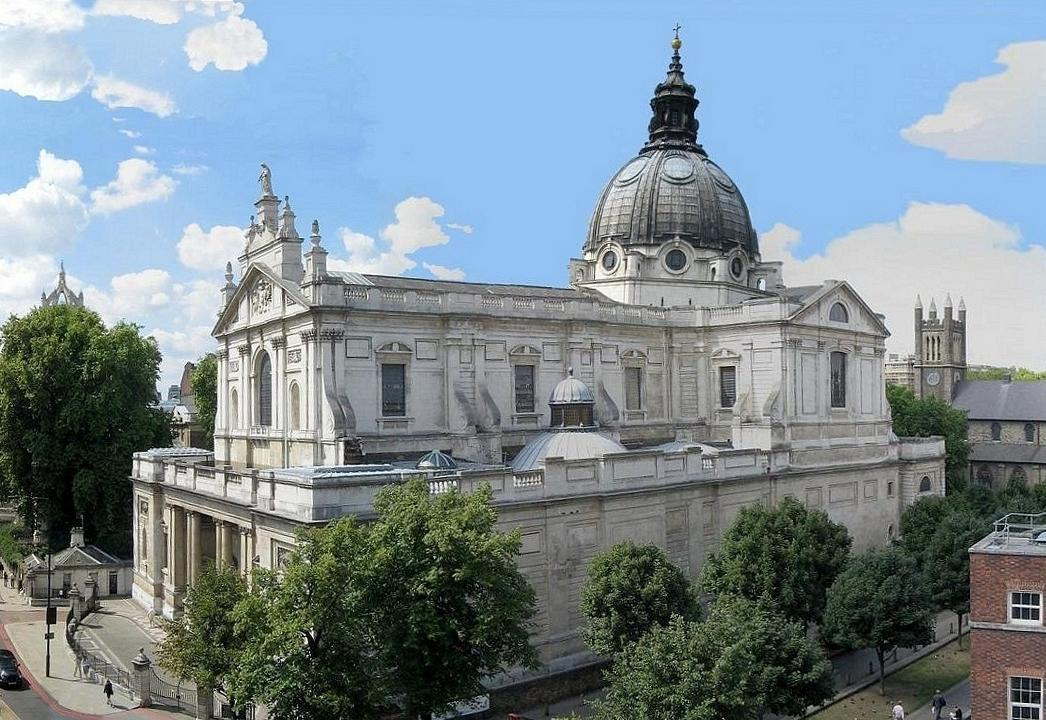
- Brompton Oratory (Church of the Immaculate Heart of Mary)

- Location within Greater London
- Population: 8,839 (2011 Census.Ward)
- OS grid reference: TQ274790
- London borough: Kensington & Chelsea
- Ceremonial county: Greater London
- Region: London
- Country: England
- Sovereign state: United Kingdom
- Post town: LONDON
- Postcode district: SW3, SW5, SW7, SW10
- Dialling code: 020
- Police: Metropolitan
- Fire: London
- Ambulance: London
- UK Parliament: Kensington and Bayswater
- London Assembly: West Central

Brompton, sometimes called Old Brompton, is an area in the Royal Borough of Kensington and Chelsea in London. Until the latter half of the 19th century it was a scattered village made up mostly of market gardens in the county of Middlesex. It lay southeast of the village of Kensington, abutting the parish of St Margaret's, Westminster at the hamlet of Knightsbridge to the northeast, with Little Chelsea to the south. It was bisected by the Fulham Turnpike, the main road westward out of London to the ancient parish of Fulham and on to Putney and Surrey. It saw its first parish church, Holy Trinity Brompton, only in 1829. Today the village has been comprehensively eclipsed by segmentation due principally to railway development culminating in London Underground lines, and its imposition of station names, including Knightsbridge, South Kensington and Gloucester Road as the names of stops during accelerated urbanisation, but lacking any cogent reference to local history and usage or distinctions from neighbouring settlements.

Brompton has been home to many writers, actors and intellectuals. The Survey of London gives a long list. Its name survives formally to this day, only just, in the shared reference to two of the council's electoral wards called, "Brompton" and "Hans Town".

== Definition ==
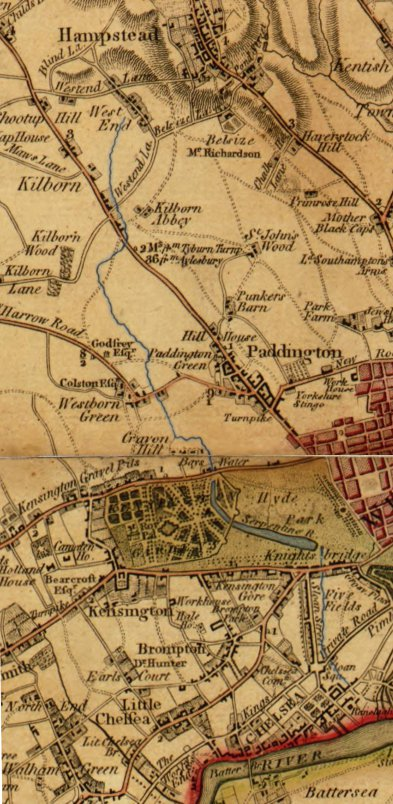
Brompton on William Faden's 1790 map

Where the old turnpike highway (Fulham Road) meets today's Thurloe Place and becomes Brompton Road is sometimes called Brompton Cross. The old village of Brompton carried on straddling the secondary Brompton Lane, later Old Brompton Road, for the whole of its length. In modern terms Old Brompton centred on today's South Kensington tube station, Gloucester Road tube station and their contiguous streets, and continued all the way to West Brompton station, between Earl's Court and Thames-side Chelsea. The historian F.H.W. Sheppard has summarised it thus:

"there was always much traffic on the old turnpike road, which linked London not only with Little Chelsea and Fulham but also (via Putney Bridge) with parts of Surrey as well, and which from 1726 to 1826 was maintained by the Kensington Turnpike Trustees. Anciently, the eastern end of this highway was known indiscriminately as the road to Fulham or the road to Brompton. The name 'Brompton', now used loosely, then applied most precisely to the settlement which lay westwards of what is now South Kensington Station, just off the turnpike road along the lane to Earl's Court. This lane, generally called Brompton Lane or Bell and Horns Lane, diverged from the main road at the Bell and Horns, an inn sited opposite the Brompton Oratory, where Empire House now stands. After the frontages of Brompton Road nearer London had been built up, the original nucleus of Brompton became known as Old Brompton and Brompton Lane as Old Brompton Road—which name survives today except in the short stretch east of South Kensington Station, where its line is represented by Thurloe Place. Before 1863 therefore, 'Brompton Road' was in general an unofficial term, usually to be construed as meaning the part of the Fulham turnpike road connecting Knightsbridge with Brompton Lane and thus with Old Brompton."

=== Extent ===
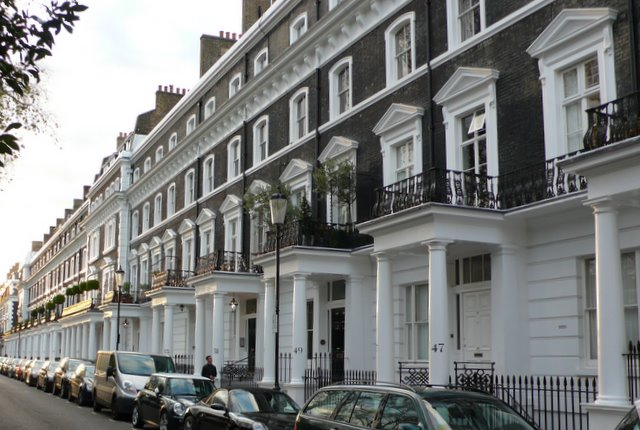
Onslow Square, London SW7, with stucco terraces typical of today's "Brompton"

Brompton's northern neighbours were the hamlets of Kensington Gore, dated but not dead in use, and Knight's bridge, a crossing over the culverted river Westbourne. As to its old eastern half its administration remains in the City of Westminster, again due to the tube network it is commonly marked on maps as part of "Knightsbridge" district. Brompton (or very rarely New Brompton) had a jagged north-eastern limit owing to the medieval permanent assignation of Kensington Gore to Westminster. According to the Church of England this has been simplified so that a three-church parish Holy Trinity Brompton – St Paul's, Onslow Square and St Augustine's, Queen's Gate takes up a 1/8 SW to WSW radial sector focused on what was for many centuries a geographical point, a bridge, "Knights Bridge (Knightsbridge)", from which Brompton was always narrowly omitted. That point later became a Crossroads for arterial roads, known as "Scotch Corner".

Boundaries can be traced in the street network with a few small gaps, clockwise from the north:

- Imperial College Road, Ennismore Street, Montpellier Mews (southern straight), Knightsbridge (street), Basil Street, Walton Street, Fulham Road, Drayton Gardens, and Ashburn, Grenville, Launceston, Kynance and Elvaston Places.

West Brompton became overshadowed by Earls Court which overtook its land, but it extended more broadly than is suggested by the above sectors, to have a long border along the hidden Counter's Creek, (today's West London line), with the Hammersmith and Fulham borough boundary, then back along the Cromwell Road/Queen's Gate through Gloucester Road.

The rest of "South Kensington" and Kensington proper, including the first manor, centred on what became a royal palace (Kensington Palace), instead of simply a manor house, and lay to the north. Chelsea was to the south.

Its fragmented existence is commemorated chiefly through four of the places listed below.

== History ==
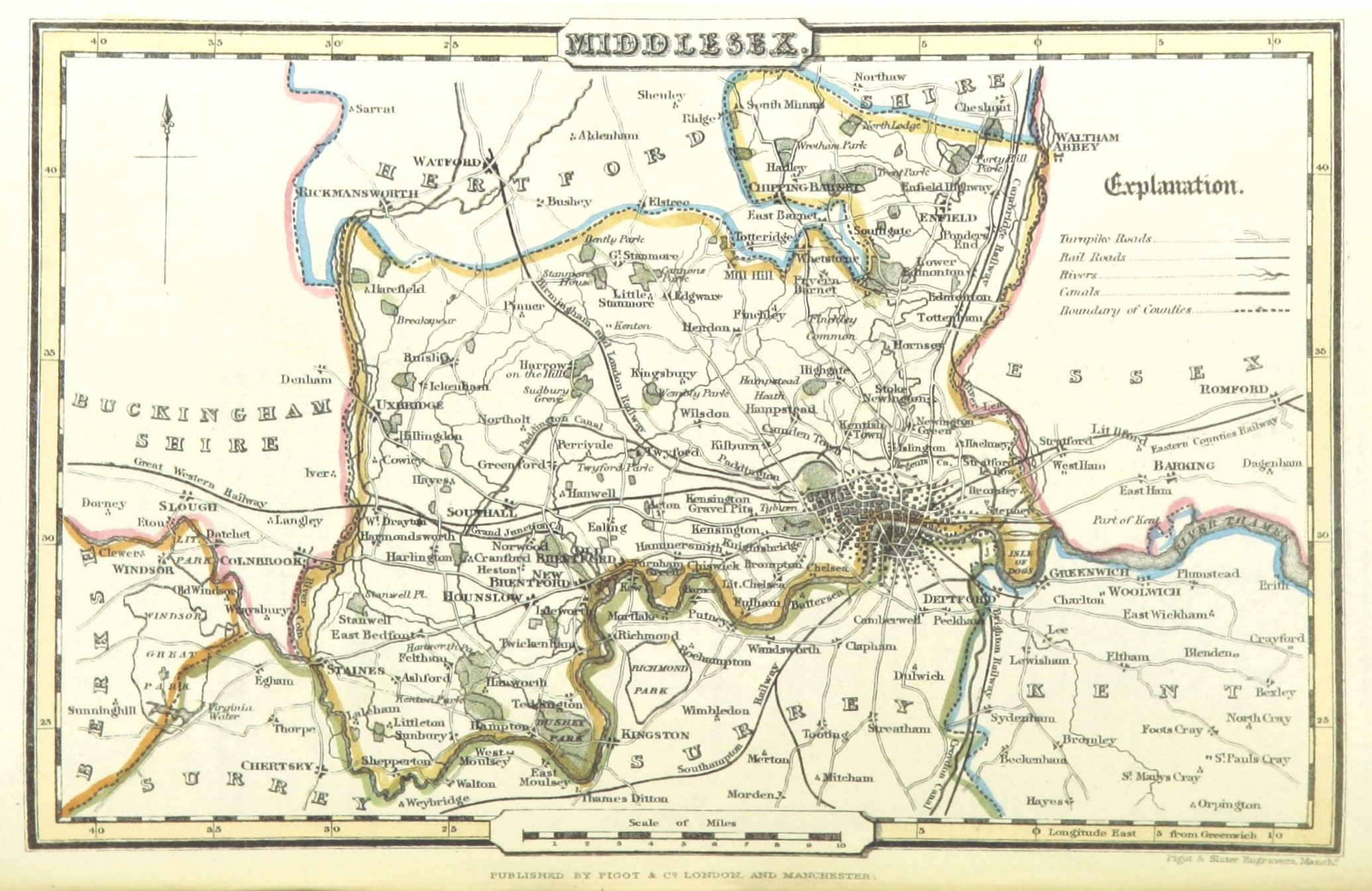
Pigot & Co. (1842) Brompton in the County of Middlesex

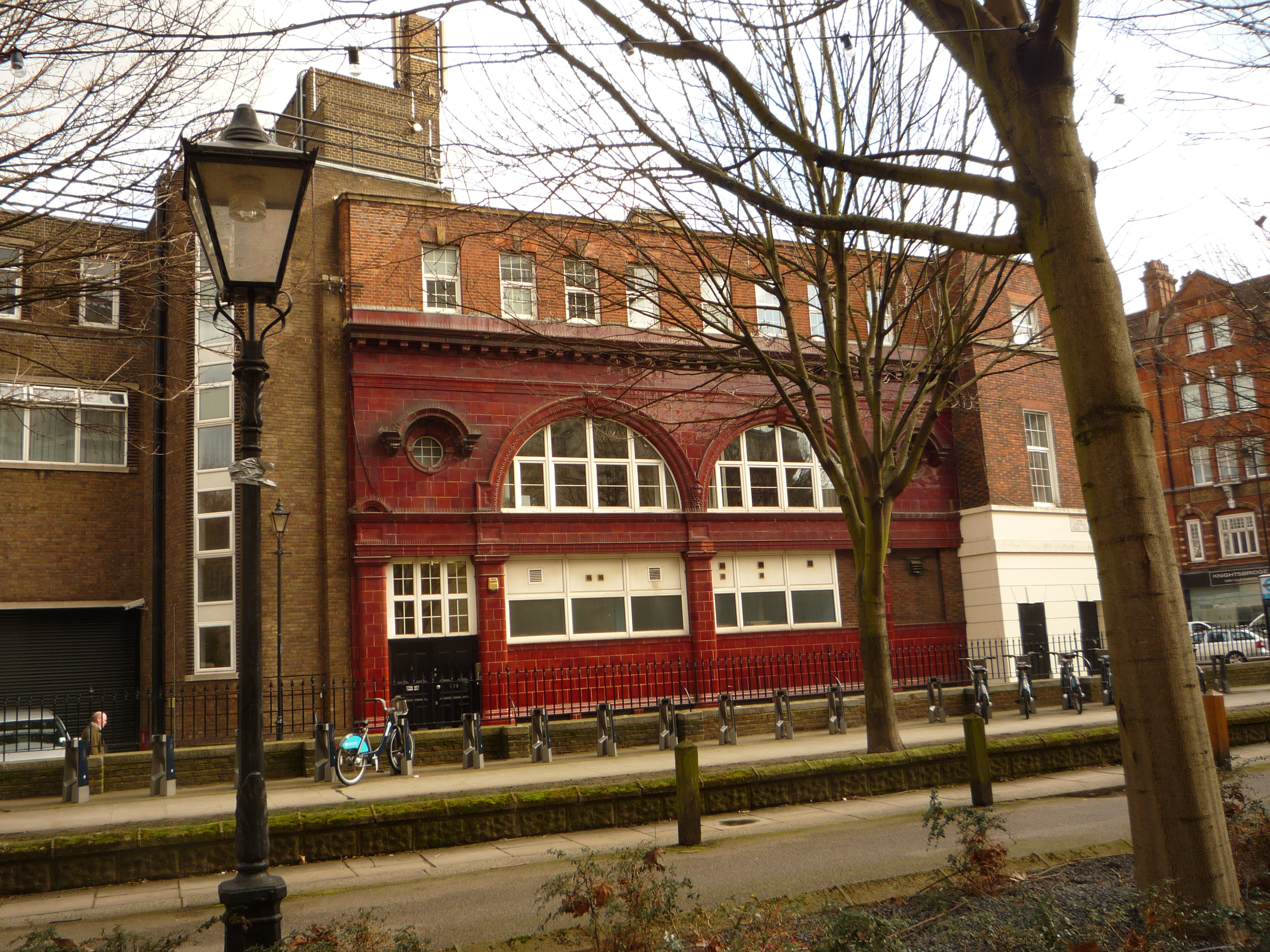
206 Brompton Road, the former station building

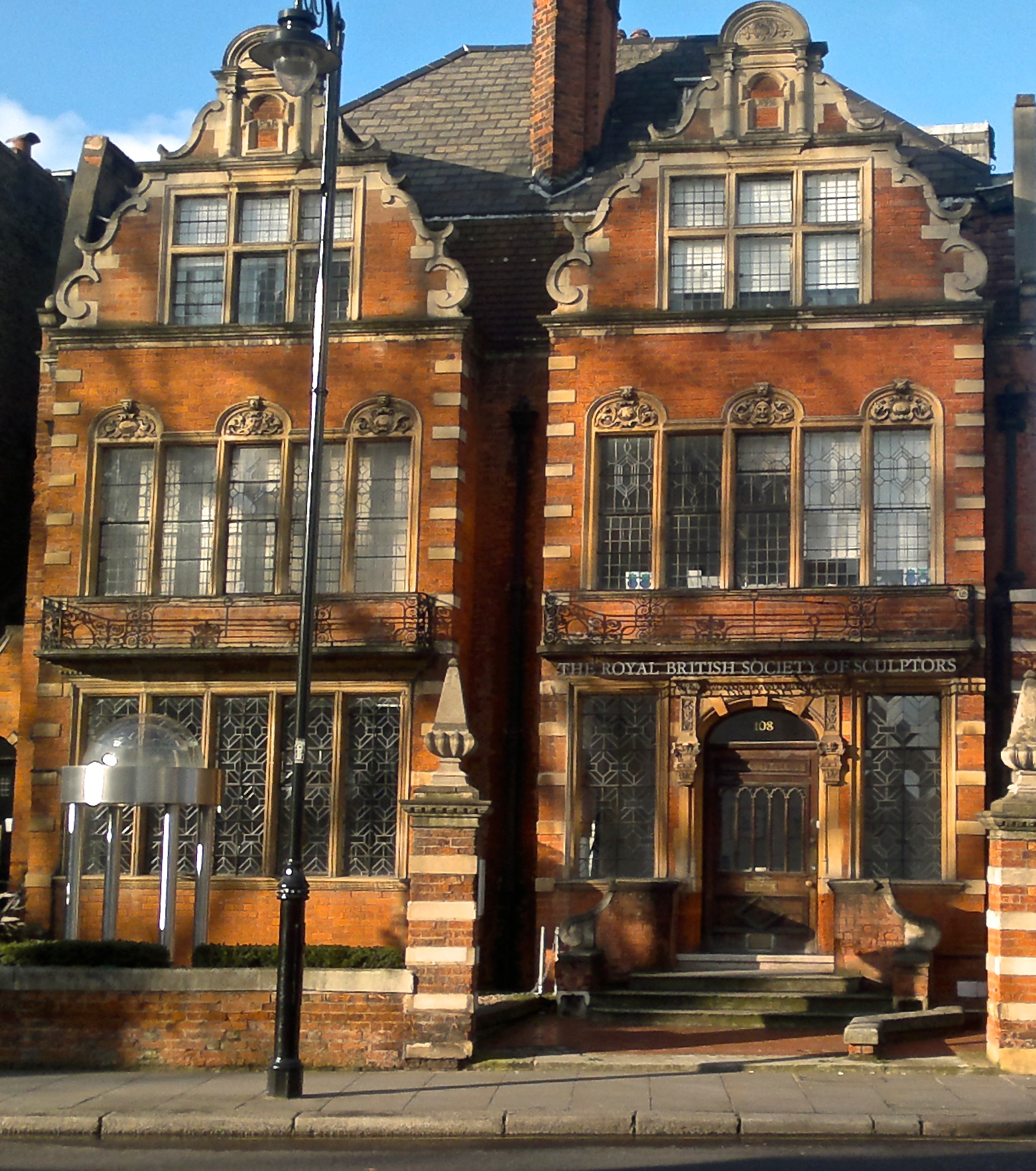
Royal Society of British Sculptors 108 Old Brompton Road

SE corner of map shows Brompton ward of Kensington Metropolitan Borough in 1916, SW as 'Redcliffe' was Old Brompton; a road, Old Brompton Road, bisected both linking to the north-west.

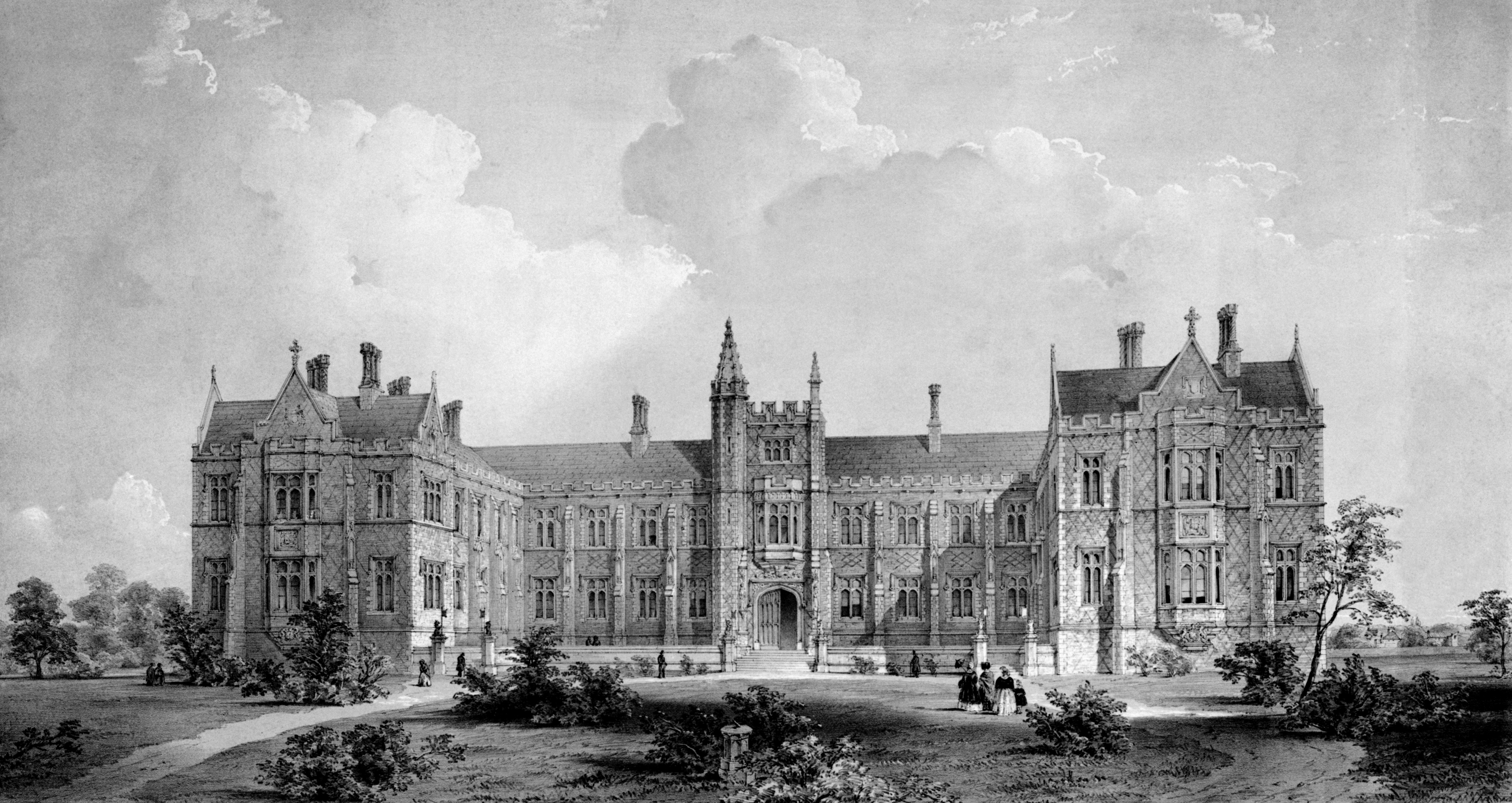
The first Brompton Hospital on the Fulham Road, c.1850

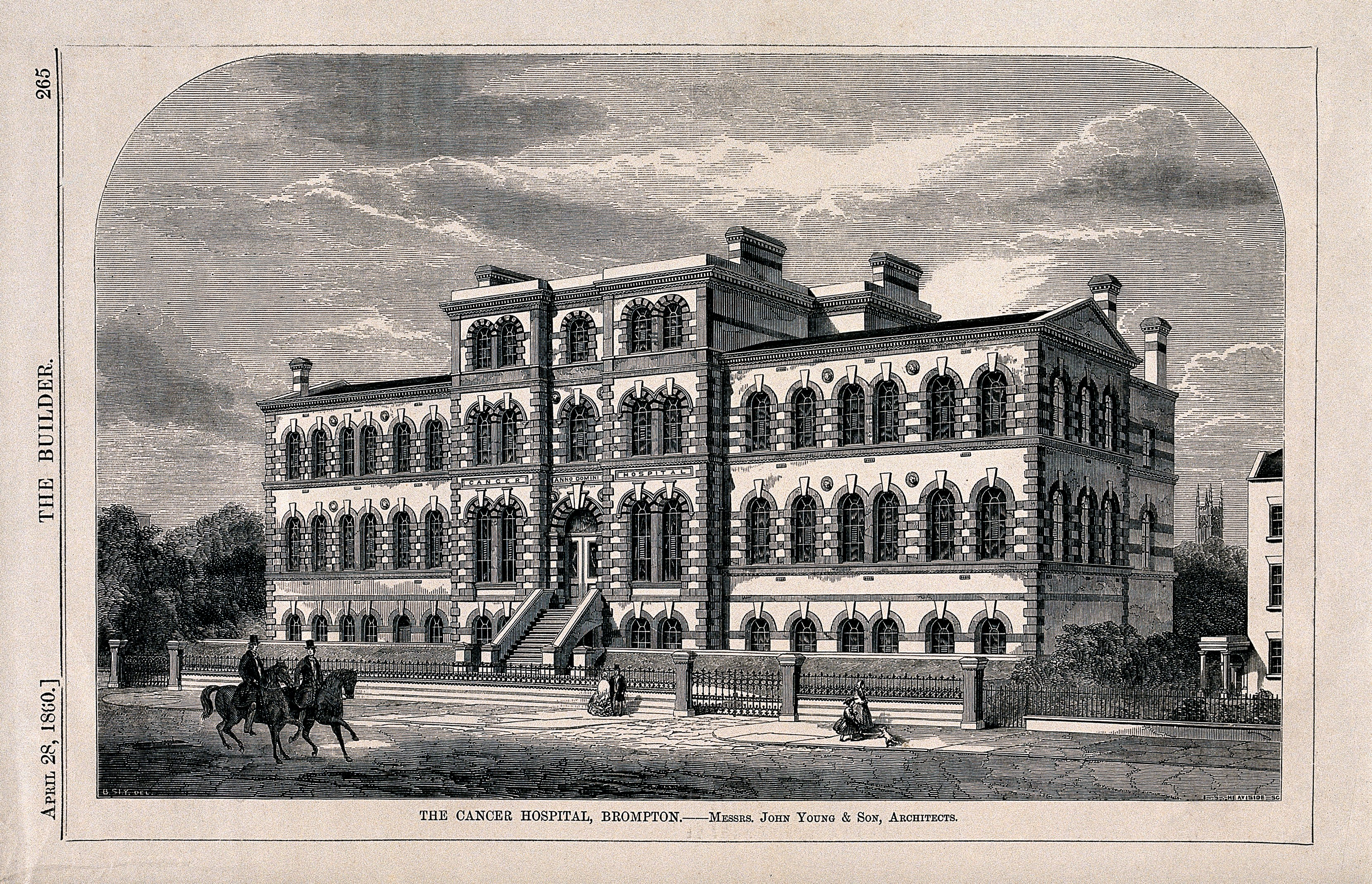
Brompton Cancer Hospital 1859, Kensington, London

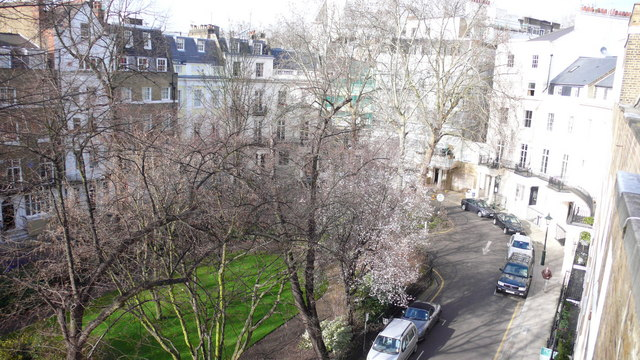
Brompton Square, London

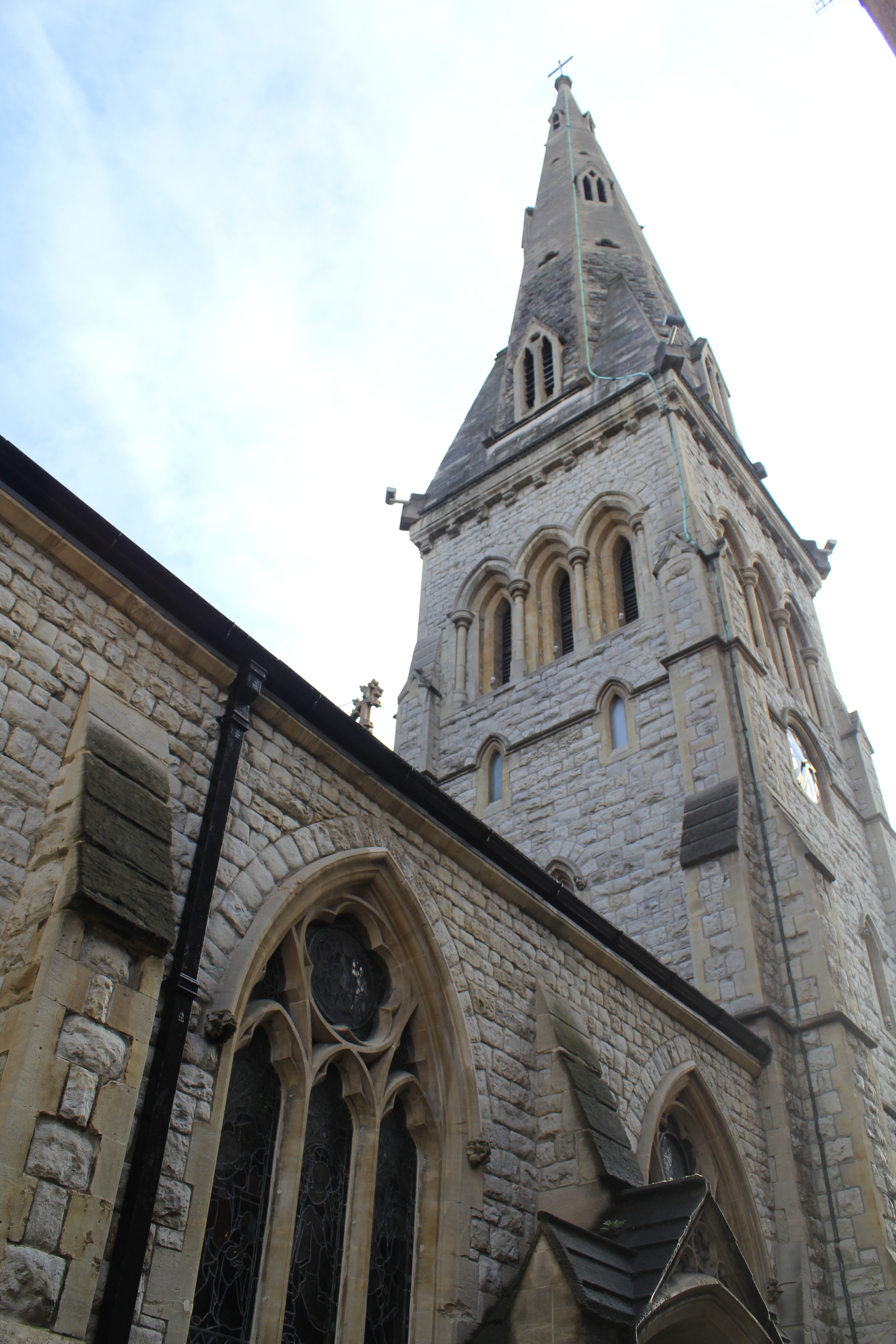
St Yeghiche Armenian cathedral, London SW7

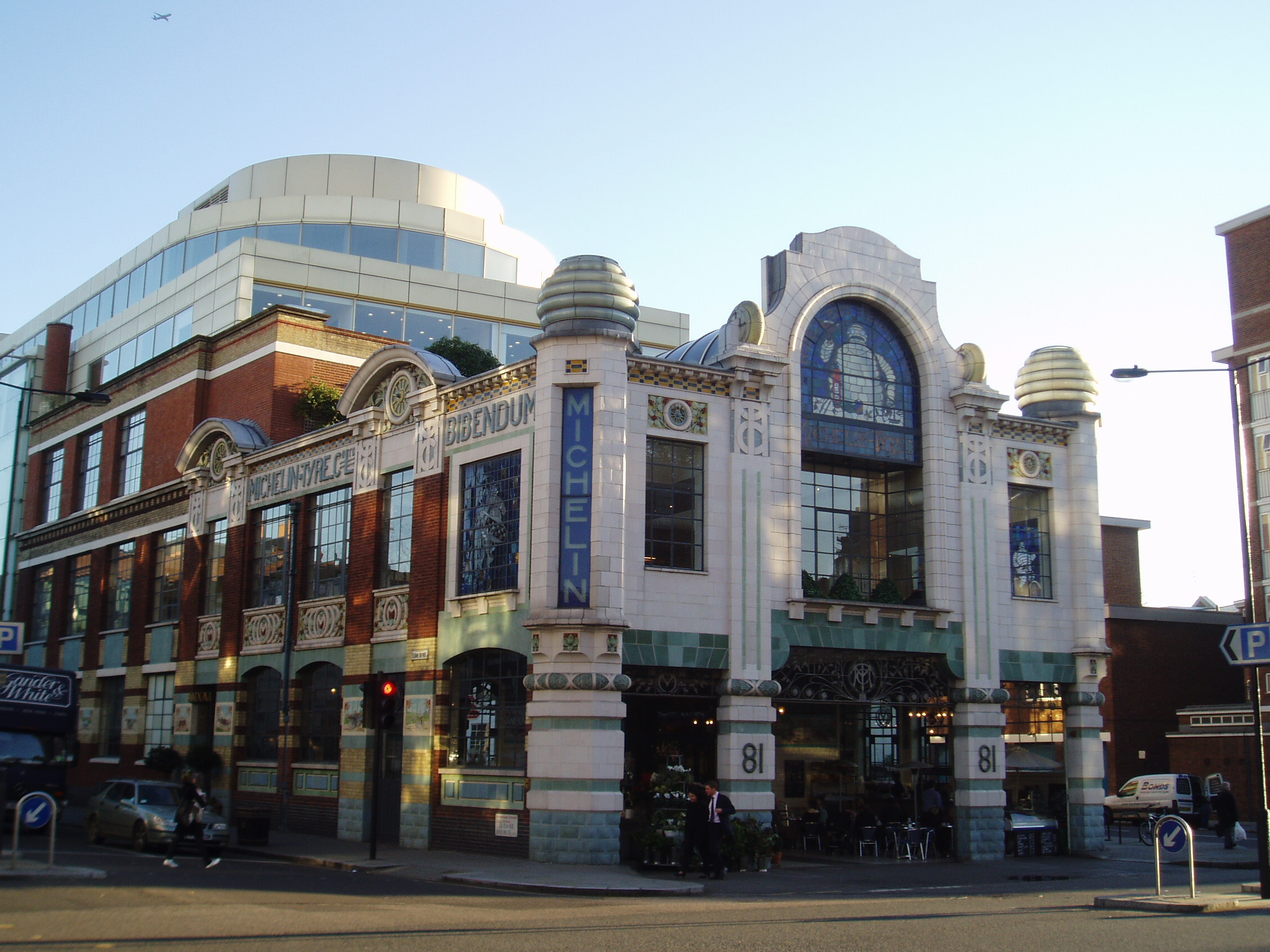
Michelin House, Brompton

The first recorded mention of Brompton dates back to 1292. It was a rural area which subsequently attracted attention as the story of developments centred along a turnpike road that ran south westward from London through Knightsbridge Green and horticultural Brompton to Little Chelsea and the ancient parish of Fulham on the banks of the Thames and thence over Putney Bridge onto the County of Surrey. Brompton Park Nurseries were founded in 1681 by four leading gardeners, led by George London. In the late 18th century, Carey's map of 1787 shows Brompton as a collection of market gardens. A hundred years later, Charles Dickens Jr. (eldest child of Charles Dickens) wrote in his 1879 book Dickens's Dictionary of London that "Brompton was at one time almost exclusively the artists' quarter and is still largely frequented by the votaries of the brush and chisel, though of late years Belgravia has been encroaching upon its boundaries, and Belgravian rents are stealing westward."

The village gained its first church in 1829, Holy Trinity Brompton, rapidly incepted a parish.

The gradual fragmentation and overshadowing of Brompton was probably due to two factors: the Great Exhibition of 1851 and the rapid institutional developments in the area, such as museums and colleges; and the arrival of railway transport. The station built in 1868 on the Metropolitan and District Railways to serve the attendant crowds was named South Kensington, not "Brompton". A "Brompton Road station" opened in 1906 for the new Great Northern, Piccadilly and Brompton Railway; lack of passengers forced it to close in 1934. Gloucester Road tube station on the other hand, which had opened 1868, was originally called "Gloucester Road, Brompton", but for simplicity dropped the Brompton from its name. Thus, Brompton ceased to be a place or destination. A nod to Brompton resurfaced in 1866 with Sir John Fowler's "station in the middle of fields", West Brompton station.

In 1965 when the historic boroughs of Kensington and Chelsea merged to form one authority, the College of Arms created for it a new coat of arms which included its Brompton roots. The crest contains a broom bush which represents the link between the two former boroughs' connection with the 'Brompton' ward. The area is now part of the Chelsea constituency. In medieval times Brompton was famous for its gorse fields. The name was a corruption of 'broom tun', meaning a gorse farm. The Royal Borough of Kensington and Chelsea has confined its "Brompton Conservation Area" to but the small northern part of the historical village of Brompton. the rest of it is partitioned among several other neighbouring conservation areas.

== Landmarks "in Brompton" ==
- Bolton's Theatre Club
- Brompton Cemetery
- Brompton Fire Station, 1868–1964 at South Parade, (Chelsea)
- Brompton Oratory
- Chelsea and Westminster Hospital, formerly St. Stephen's Hospital, founded as "St George's Union Infirmary" in 1878.
- Church of St Yeghiche, Armenian cathedral, formerly, St Peter's Cranley Gardens, 1866-7
- Deutsche Evangelische Christuskirche in 1904-5
- Fulham Road Jewish Cemetery formerly known as the "Jewish Cemetery, Brompton", opened 1815
- Gloucester Road tube station formerly known as "Gloucester Road, Brompton"
- Goethe-Institut
- Grabowski Gallery (1959–1975), former Avant-garde art gallery at 84 Sloane Avenue SW3
- Holy Trinity Brompton
- Holy Trinity Prince Consort Road in 1899
- Imperial College London
- French Institute
- Ishmaili Centre
- Lycée Français Charles de Gaulle
- Michelin House
- Natural History Museum
- Paris Pullman Cinema
- Royal Brompton Hospital, formerly known as "Brompton Consumption Hospital"
- Royal Marsden Hospital, formerly known as the "New Cancer Hospital"
- Royal Society of Sculptors
- Science Museum
- South Kensington tube station
- St Augustine's, Queen's Gate
- St Paul's, Onslow Square
- Victoria and Albert Museum
- West Brompton station

=== Notable streets of Brompton ===
- Beauchamp Place
- The Boltons
- Brompton Place
- Brompton Road
- Brompton Square
- Cranley Gardens
- Cromwell Road
- Drayton Gardens
- Egerton Gardens
- Exhibition Road
- Fulham Road
- Gloucester Road
- Hereford Square
- Lennox Gardens
- Old Brompton Road
- Onslow Square
- Ovington Square
- Pont Street
- Prince Consort Road
- Queen's Gate
- Thurloe Square
- Walton Street

== Governance ==
Brompton is part of the Kensington and Bayswater constituency for elections to the House of Commons of the United Kingdom, represented by Labour MP Joe Powell since 2024.

Brompton is part of the Brompton and Hans Town ward for elections to Kensington and Chelsea London Borough Council.

== Nearest places ==
Brompton and Old Brompton are deemed de facto obsolete names by the Tube and postal systems:

- the eastern part: Brompton Road (and adjuncts) currently subsumed under Knightsbridge.
- the central part: subsumed under South Kensington
- the southern part: subsumed under Gloucester Road whose tube stop dropped "Brompton" from its title, and is either obfuscated as South Kensington or as Chelsea, depending on usage in Anglican parish boundaries or postal convenience-drawn limits.

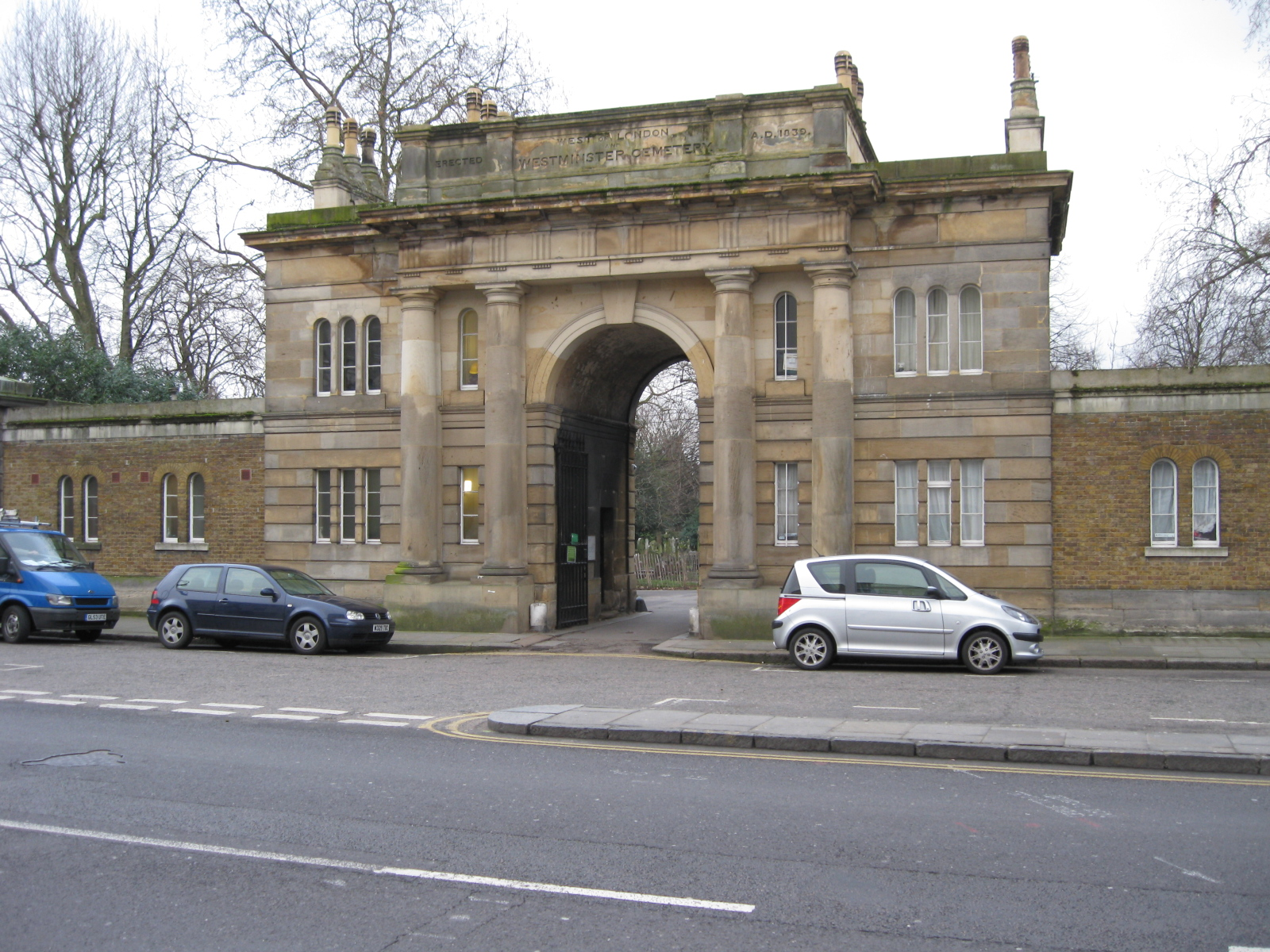
Brompton Cemetery North Gate on Old Brompton Road

- Belgravia
- Brompton Cemetery
- Chelsea Physic Garden
- Royal Hospital Chelsea
- Earl's Court
- Fulham Broadway
- Hyde Park
- Kensington Gardens
- Kensington
- Little Chelsea
- Sloane Square
- West Brompton

Developers of the Earls Court Exhibition Centre, Lillie Bridge Depot and extant Victorian residential streets at West Brompton have given birth to an entity called, "West Brompton Crossing" to refer to the pop-up retail currently occupying the John Young condemned buildings, in the vicinity of Lillie Bridge (Fulham) and West Brompton station.

== Notable people ==
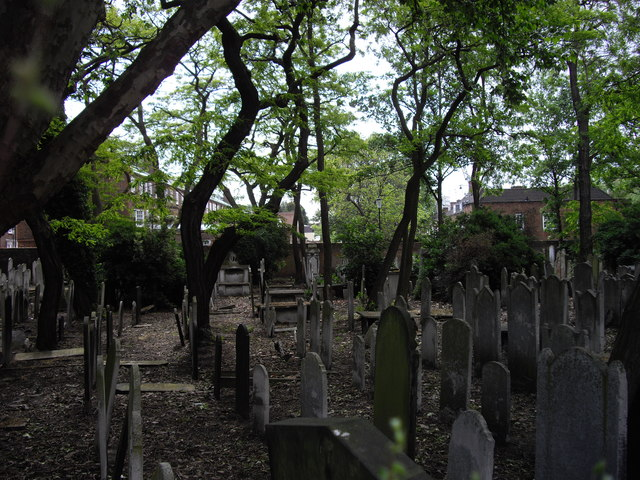
Jewish Cemetery, Fulham Road, Brompton

- Muzio Clementi (1752–1832), Italian-born composer, pianist and influential pedagogue lived in Brompton Grove
- William Wilberforce (1759–1833), English politician, philanthropist and abolitionist
- George Canning (1770–1827), British Tory politician, lived in the area in at least 1809
- Caroline Clive (1801–1873), English writer
- Henry Cole (1808–1882), civil servant, activist, inventor, started the idea of the Christmas card
- Jenny Lind (1820–1887), Swedish opera singer lived in Bolton Place
- W. S. Gilbert (1836–1911), dramatist and librettist lived in Harrington Gardens
- Nicky Gumbel vicar at Holy Trinity Brompton
- Edmund Halswell QC (1790–1874), barrister of Gore Lodge, Old Brompton
- Nicky Lee (priest) associate vicar at Holy Trinity Brompton
- Stéphane Mallarmé (1842–1898), French poet
- Sandy Millar Vicar, Holy Trinity Brompton (1985–2005)
- Amy Louisa Rye (1851–unknown), English writer and social reformer
- Charles Canning, 1st Earl Canning, British politician and Governor-General of India
- Edwin Lutyens (1869–1944), Anglo-Irish architect
- Norman Whitten (1885–1969), English early film actor, director and producer
- Agatha Christie (1890–1976), English crime writer lived at Cresswell Place
- Mervyn Peake (1911–1968), English writer, poet and illustrator lived in Drayton Gardens
- Rosalind Franklin (1920–1958), British chemist and X-ray crystallographer who made a ground-breaking contribution to the understanding of the molecular structures of DNA
