= Bolton's Theatre Club =

Coordinates: 51.4884°N 0.1807°W

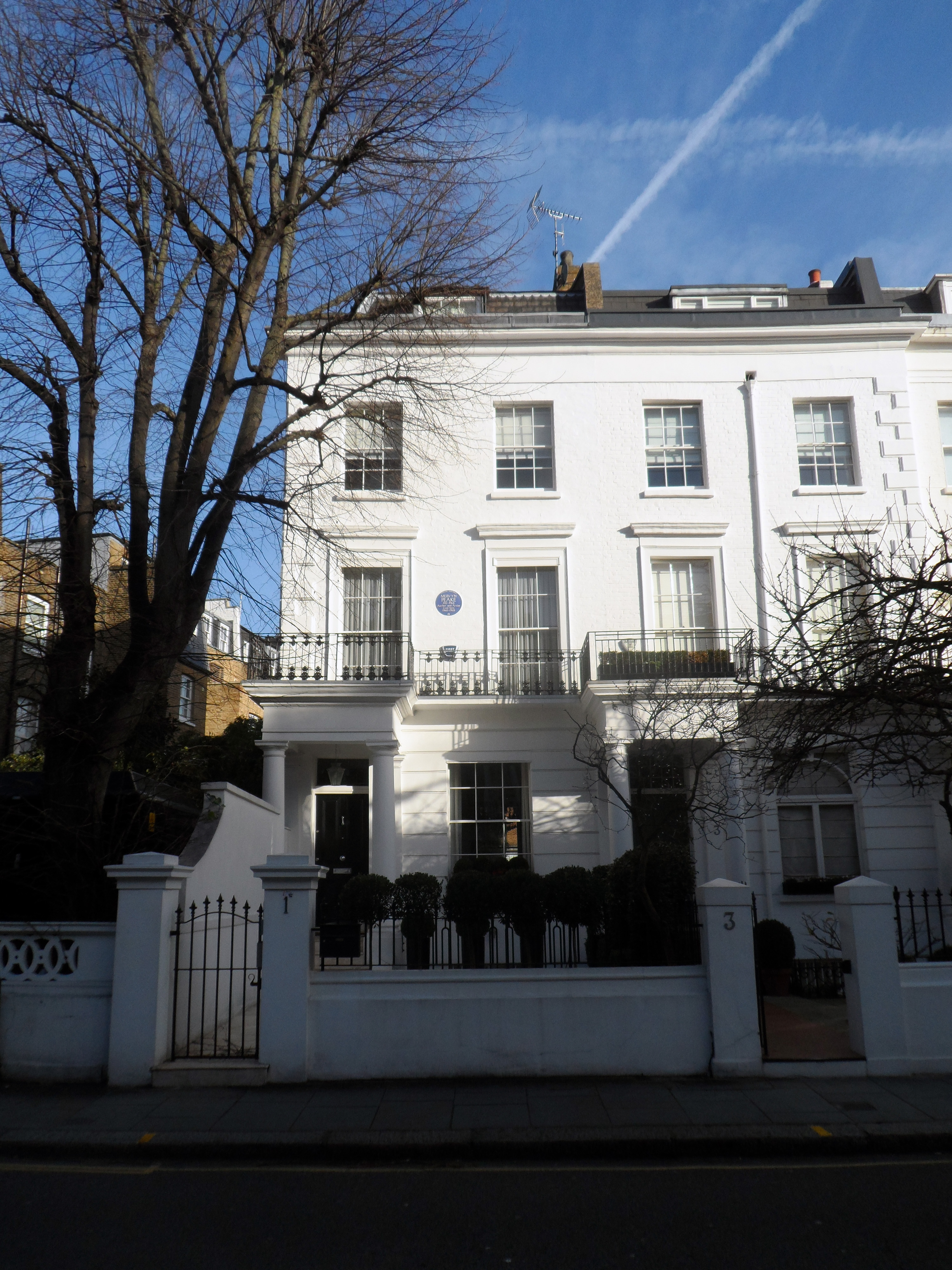
Drayton Gardens in 2015

Bolton's Theatre Club in Drayton Gardens, Brompton, London launched in 1947 in a building originally opened in 1911 as the Radium Picture Playhouse. By operating as a club where membership was obligatory, the theatre was able to stage plays which might otherwise be prohibited under the Theatres Act 1843. Many of its plays transferred to the West End.

After closure and conversion the building was reopened in 1955 as the Paris Pullman Cinema, which showed art-house films until its final closure and demolition in 1983. James Quinn was one of its directors.

== Plays ==
- 1948 – Oscar Wilde by Leslie and Sewell Stokes (1937), with Frank Pettingell as Wilde, directed by Sewell Stokes.
- 1948 – Native Son by Richard Wright and Paul Green.
- 1948 – Hocus-Pocus by Jonquil Antony.
- 1949 – The Horn of the Moon by Vivian Connell, with Jack McNaughton, Denholm Elliott, John Wyse, Pamela Alan, Martin Boddey and Jessie Evans. Directed by Colin Chandler.
- 1953 – Dr John Bull, with John Louis Mansi and others.

== See also ==
- Gate Theatre Studio
- Gate Theatre, Notting Hill, London
