= Musette Majendie =

Musette Majendie CBE
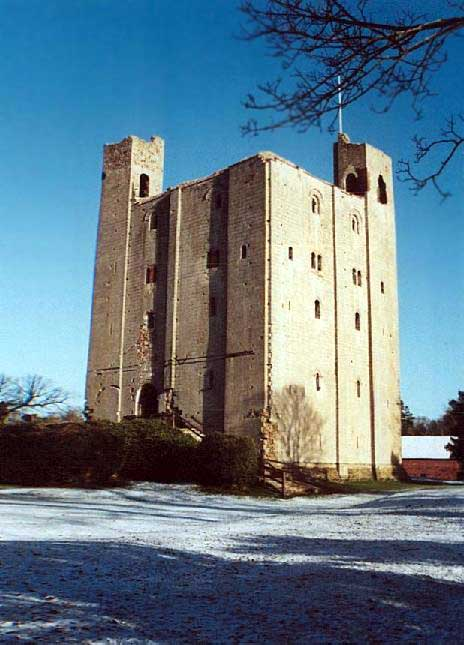
- The keep, Hedingham Castle
- Born: 1 December 1903; Sudbury, Suffolk, England
- Died: 24 January 1981 (aged 77); Essex, England
- Occupation(s): landowner and philanthropist
- Known for: Owner of Hedingham Castle
- Partner: Margery Blackie
- Father: James Henry Alexander Majendie
- Relatives: Lewis Majendie (grandfather); Francis Grenfell, 1st Baron Grenfell (uncle, by marriage)
- Awards: Scout Association Medal of Merit, Scout Association Silver Acorn Medal

Musette Frances Jacqueline Natalie Majendie CBE (1 December 1903 – 24 January 1981) was an English landowner and philanthropist. She was the owner of Hedingham Castle in Essex.

== Family ==
Majendie was born on 1 December 1903 in Sudbury, Suffolk. Her father was politician James Henry Alexander Majendie MP. Her mother was local Women's Institute leader Beatrice Cecilia Majendie (née Mitchell), the daughter of James Mitchell of Holbrook Hall. On her paternal line, she was the granddaughter of politician Lewis Majendie MP and his wife Lady Margaret Elizabeth Majendie (née Lindsay).

The Majendie family had owned Hedingham Castle for 250 years until Majendie left it to her cousin Thomas Lindsay.

== Community projects ==
From 1930, Majendie led a programme at Hedingham supported by the Ministry of Labour to train unemployed men from towns and mining villages in the North of England for jobs in service. She was appointed Commander of the British Empire for this scheme in the 1935 Birthday Honours.

After World War II, Majendie developed a close relationship with Dr Margery Blackie, who began to spend every weekend at Hedingham and consider the castle home. In 1951, Majendie and Blackie donated two acres of land, which had been intended for use as a war memorial until an alternative site was found, to Halstead Council for building council houses.

Majendie and Blackie held events at the castle such as fashion shows to raise funds for their respective interests, the Scout movement in Essex and the Homeopathic Society. Majendie was a scout leader from 1910, with the keep serving as the scout hut of the 1st Castle Hedingham Scouts and camps taking place in the grounds. The castle features on the unit badge. Majendie was awarded the Scout Association Medal of Merit in 1930 and the Scout Association Silver Acorn Medal in 1935.

Majendie and Blackie also opened the gardens at Hedingham for the National Gardens Scheme.

== Death and commemoration ==
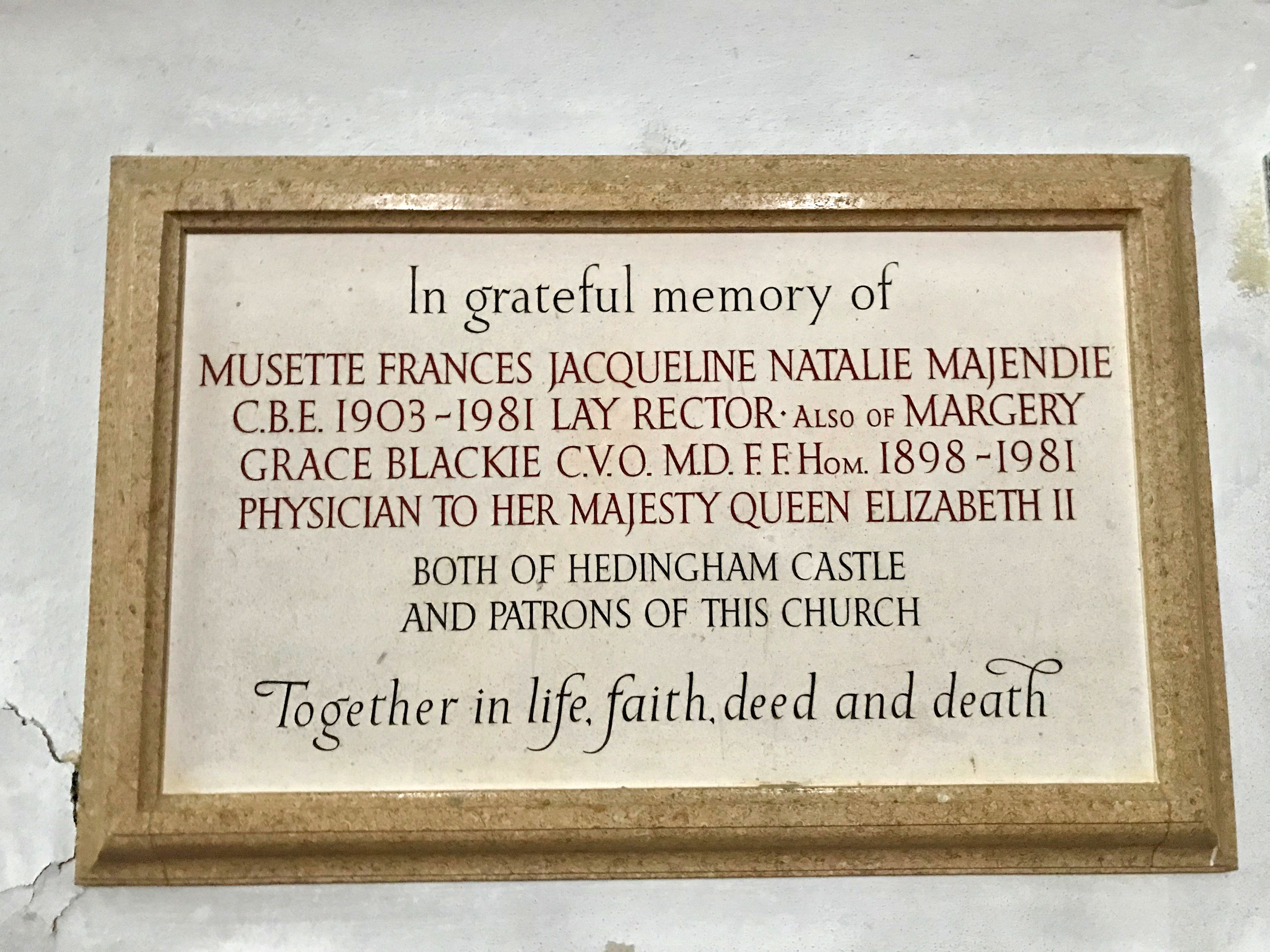
Memorial to Musette Majendie and Margery Blackie in St Nicholas' Church, Castle Hedingham, Essex

In the last year of her life, from 1980 to 1981, she lived at Hedingham Castle with Blackie. Majendie died on 24 January 1981, aged 77. She was remembered as a "fine horsewoman, crack shot and [being] known to chop down trees single-handed".

Majendie and Blackie were jointly commemorated on a plaque in St Nicholas' Church, Castle Hedingham.

On 23 June 2022, a commemorative blue plaque for commemorating Majendie was unveiled at Wooding Lodge, the Scout Hut for 1st Castle Hedingham Scouts. It was funded by the Scout group and the Hedingham History Group.
