= Empire House, London =

Building in London, England

Empire House
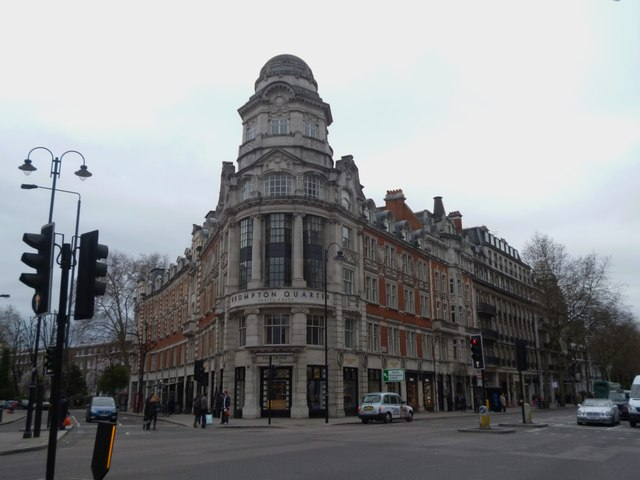
- Empire House

General information
- Type: Originally commercial, now residential
- Architectural style: Edwardian Baroque
- Location: London, England
- Coordinates: 51°29′46″N 0°10′11″W
- Completed: 1916

Design and construction
- Architect: Paul Hoffman

Listed Building – Grade II
- Official name: Empire House
- Designated: 01 May 2012
- Reference no.: 1405810

Empire House is a Grade II listed building in the South Kensington area of London. Originally built as an office for the Continental Tyre Company, it occupies a prominent position on the junction between Brompton Road and Thurloe Place, often known as Brompton Cross.

== History ==
The Continental Tyre Company owned a showroom on Clerkenwell Road from 1898 but in 1909 planned to move to South Kensington, submitting an application for a large headquarters. The area occupied by Empire House, in what is sometimes known as the Alexander Estate, was previously occupied by the Bell and Horns inn. It was built as part of a block including the nearby Dalmena House, built 15 years after, and Rembrandt Hotel.

Construction began in 1910, occurring in two phases. The first, surrounding the Bell and Horns, was completed in 1911 and construction was paused until the demolition of the inn in 1915. The building site was used to hold prisoners of war during the First World War. The site was abandoned by Continental in 1925 and converted into shops and residential units with Henry Branch as architect.

== Design ==
Empire House occupies a prominent triangular plot at the junction where Thurloe Place splits off from Brompton Road as it curves south, often known as Brompton Cross. The building is of an opulent Edwardian Baroque style, possibly inspired by the exterior of the Victoria and Albert Museum opposite, designed by Aston Webb. It is decorated in iconography representing the tyres of the building's original tenant, as well as figurative sculpture above the main entrance. The building's focal point is on the northeast corner, topped with a cupola described by Pevsner as a "squat dome" crowning a "disappointing landmark" by Nikolaus Pevsner in his architectural guides of Britain.

The building is however Grade II listed for its architectural interest, an exceptional example of Edwardian Architecture as well as its historic significance through connections to the emerging motor industry in Britain.
