= Earl Attlee =

British peerage title created in 1955 for Clement Attlee

Earldom Attlee
- Blazon Arms: Azure, on a Chevron Or, between three Hearts Or, winged Argent, three Lions rampant Sable. Crest: On a Mount Vert, two Lions rampant addorsed Or. Supporters: On either side a Welsh Terrier sejant proper.
- Creation date: 16 December 1955
- Created by: Queen Elizabeth II
- Peerage: Peerage of the United Kingdom
- First holder: Clement Attlee
- Present holder: John Attlee, 3rd Earl Attlee
- Heir apparent: None
- Remainder to: the 1st Earl's heirs male lawfully begotten
- Subsidiary titles: Viscount Prestwood
- Status: Extant
- Motto: LABOR VINCIT OMNIA (Labour conquers all)

Earl Attlee is a title in the Peerage of the United Kingdom. It was created on 16 December 1955 for Clement Attlee, the former Labour prime minister. At the same time he was made Viscount Prestwood, of Walthamstow in the County of Essex, which serves as the subsidiary title to the earldom and is also in the Peerage of the United Kingdom.

As of 2022, the titles are held by his grandson, the third Earl, who succeeded his father in 1991. In contrast to his father and grandfather, the current Lord Attlee is a member of the Conservative Party.

Air Vice-Marshal Donald Laurence Attlee, CB, LVO, DL (2 September 1922 – 28 April 2021), was a nephew of the 1st Earl Attlee.

== Earls Attlee (1955) ==
- Clement Richard Attlee, 1st Earl Attlee (1883–1967)
- Martin Richard Attlee, 2nd Earl Attlee (1927–1991)
- John Richard Attlee, 3rd Earl Attlee (born 1956)

There is no heir to the earldom.

== Bibliography ==
- Kidd, Charles, Williamson, David (editors). Debrett's Peerage and Baronetage (1990 edition). New York: St Martin's Press, 1990.
- Leigh Rayment's Peerage Pages
