= Martin Attlee, 2nd Earl Attlee =

British politician

The Right Honourable The Earl Attlee

Member of the House of Lords
- Lord Temporal
- In office 8 October 1967 – 27 July 1991
- Preceded by: The 1st Earl Attlee
- Succeeded by: The 3rd Earl Attlee

Personal details
- Born: Martin Richard Attlee; 10 August 1927 West Ham, Essex, England
- Died: 27 July 1991 (aged 63) Southampton, Hampshire, England
- Party: Labour (until 1981); SDP (1981–1988); 'Continuing' SDP (1988–1990)
- Spouses: Anne Henderson (m. 1955; div. 1988); Margaret Gouriet (m. 1988)
- Children: 2, including John, 3rd Earl Attlee
- Parents: Clement Attlee (father); Violet Millar (mother)
- Education: University College, Southampton

Martin Richard Attlee, 2nd Earl Attlee (10 August 1927 – 27 July 1991), was a British politician and a founding member of the Social Democratic Party. He was the only son of former British Prime Minister Clement Attlee.

== Early life ==
Attlee suffered badly from dyslexia, and was a poor student as a child. His father chose to tackle this issue by having his son educated at Millfield School, which under its founding headmaster, the educationalist Jack Meyer, was noted for its progressive approach to reading problems. Attlee did well enough to study at the School of Navigation at University College, Southampton (now the University of Southampton), and served from 1945 to 1950 in the Merchant Navy. After a spell working for the airline Iberia, among other companies, he eventually joined British Rail's Southern Region, working for a long time in its public relations department; it was this experience that prompted him to write his book Bluff Your Way in PR (1971).

== Parliamentary career ==
Attlee inherited the earldom, which carried with it a seat in the House of Lords, on his father's death in 1967. For some fourteen years he sat on the Labour Party benches, as his father had done, but in 1981 he joined the Social Democratic Party (SDP). After the SDP opted for a merger with the Liberal Party, Attlee was one of the minority who chose to remain in the 'continuing' SDP led by David Owen, standing for that party in the Hampshire Central European Parliament by-election in December 1988, where he received 5,952 votes (7.7%). At the time, he commented, "Some people say that my father must be turning in his grave. But if so, it would only be because of the sight of the present so-called Labour Party."

== Personal life ==
Attlee married Anne Henderson on 16 February 1955. They had a son and a daughter before divorcing in 1988. Attlee married Margaret Gouriet the same year.

== Death ==
Attlee died at Southampton General Hospital on 27 July 1991 at the age of 63 following a stroke. His peerage was inherited by his son John, who takes the Conservative whip.

== Arms ==
Coat of arms of Earls Attlee
Crest On a mount vert two lions rampant addorsed or. Escutcheon Azure, on a chevron, or, between three hearts of the last winged argent, as many lions rampant sable. Supporters On either side a Welsh terrier sejant proper. Motto Labor vincit omnia (Labour conquers all).

Peerage of the United Kingdom
Preceded by Clement Attlee	Earl Attlee; 1967–1991; Member of the House of Lords (1967–1991)	Succeeded by John Attlee
