= Clement Attlee =

Prime Minister of the United Kingdom from 1945 to 1951

The Right Honourable The Earl Attlee KG OM CH TD PC FRS
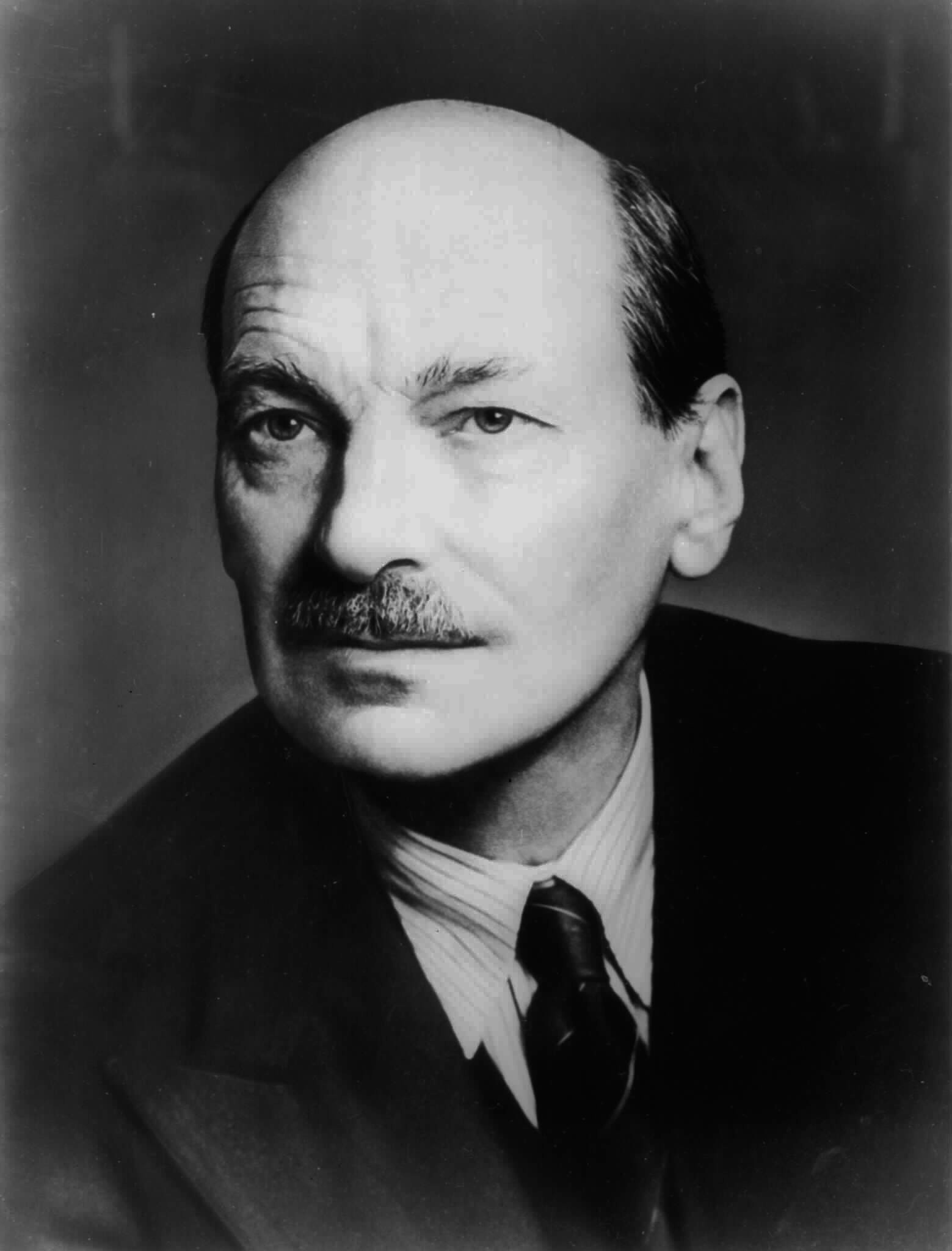
- Portrait, c. 1945

Prime Minister of the United Kingdom
- In office 26 July 1945 – 26 October 1951
- Monarch: George VI
- Deputy: Herbert Morrison
- Preceded by: Winston Churchill
- Succeeded by: Winston Churchill
Senior political offices
Leader of the Opposition
In office 26 October 1951 – 25 November 1955
Monarchs	George VI; Elizabeth II
Prime Minister	Winston Churchill; Anthony Eden
Preceded by	Winston Churchill
Succeeded by	Herbert Morrison
In office 23 May – 26 July 1945
Monarch	George VI
Prime Minister	Winston Churchill
Preceded by	Arthur Greenwood
Succeeded by	Winston Churchill
In office 8 October 1935 – 11 May 1940
Monarchs	George V; Edward VIII; George VI
Prime Minister	Stanley Baldwin; Neville Chamberlain
Preceded by	George Lansbury
Succeeded by	Hastings Lees-Smith
Leader of the Labour Party
In office 25 October 1935 – 7 December 1955
Deputy	Arthur Greenwood; Herbert Morrison
Preceded by	George Lansbury
Succeeded by	Hugh Gaitskell (Note: Herbert Morrison acted between 7 December and 14 December 1955.)
Deputy Leader of the Labour Party
In office 25 October 1932 – 25 October 1935
Leader	George Lansbury
Preceded by	J. R. Clynes
Succeeded by	Arthur Greenwood
Deputy Leader of the Opposition
In office 5 November 1931 – 8 October 1935
Leader	George Lansbury
Preceded by	J. R. Clynes
Succeeded by	Arthur Greenwood
Wartime ministerial offices
Deputy Prime Minister of the United Kingdom
De facto 19 February 1942 – 23 May 1945
Prime Minister	Winston Churchill
Preceded by	Office established
Succeeded by	Herbert Morrison (de facto)
Lord President of the Council
In office 28 September 1943 – 23 May 1945
Prime Minister	Winston Churchill
Preceded by	Sir John Anderson
Succeeded by	The Lord Woolton
Secretary of State for Dominion Affairs
In office 15 February 1942 – 24 September 1943
Prime Minister	Winston Churchill
Preceded by	Viscount Cranborne
Succeeded by	Viscount Cranborne
Lord Keeper of the Privy Seal
In office 12 May 1940 – 15 February 1942
Prime Minister	Winston Churchill
Preceded by	Kingsley Wood
Succeeded by	Stafford Cripps
Interwar ministerial offices
Postmaster General
In office 13 March 1931 – 25 August 1931
Prime Minister	Ramsay MacDonald
Preceded by	Hastings Lees-Smith
Succeeded by	William Ormsby-Gore
Chancellor of the Duchy of Lancaster
In office 23 May 1930 – 13 March 1931
Prime Minister	Ramsay MacDonald
Preceded by	Oswald Mosley
Succeeded by	The Lord Ponsonby
Parliamentary Under-Secretary of State for War
In office 23 January 1924 – 4 November 1924
Prime Minister	Ramsay MacDonald
Preceded by	Wilfrid Ashley
Succeeded by	Richard Onslow

Member of the House of Lords
- Lord Temporal
- Hereditary peerage 25 January 1956 – 8 October 1967
- Preceded by: Earldom created
- Succeeded by: The 2nd Earl Attlee

Member of Parliament
- In office 15 November 1922 – 16 December 1955
- Preceded by: William Pearce
- Succeeded by: Edward Redhead
- Constituency: Limehouse (1922–1950); Walthamstow West (1950–1955)

Personal details
- Born: Clement Richard Attlee; 3 January 1883 Putney, Surrey, England
- Died: 8 October 1967 (aged 84) Westminster, London, England
- Resting place: Westminster Abbey
- Party: Labour
- Spouse: Violet Millar (m. 1922; died 1964)
- Children: 4, including Martin, 2nd Earl Attlee
- Education: Haileybury; University College, Oxford
- Occupation: Politician; barrister; lecturer; social worker; soldier

Military service
- Branch/service: British Army; Territorial Army
- Years of service: 1914–1919
- Rank: Major
- Unit: South Lancashire Regiment; Tank Corps
- Battles/wars: First World War; Gallipoli campaign; Mesopotamian campaign; Western Front
- Awards: Territorial Decoration; 1914–15 Star; British War Medal; Victory Medal

Clement Richard Attlee, 1st Earl Attlee (3 January 1883 – 8 October 1967) was a British statesman who served as Prime Minister of the United Kingdom from 1945 to 1951 and Leader of the Labour Party from 1935 to 1955. Attlee was deputy prime minister during the wartime coalition government under Winston Churchill, and Leader of the Opposition on three occasions: from 1935 to 1940, briefly in 1945 and from 1951 to 1955. He remains the longest-serving Labour leader.

Attlee was born in 1883 into an upper middle class family, the son of a wealthy London solicitor. He attended Haileybury College and the University of Oxford, then practised as a barrister. The volunteer work he carried out in London's East End exposed him to poverty, and his political views shifted leftwards thereafter. He joined the Independent Labour Party in 1908, gave up his legal career, and began lecturing at the London School of Economics; with his work briefly interrupted by service as an officer in the First World War. In 1919, he became mayor of Stepney and in 1922 was elected to Parliament as the Member for Limehouse.

Attlee served in the first Labour minority government led by Ramsay MacDonald in 1924, and then joined the Cabinet during MacDonald's second minority (1929–1931). After retaining his seat in Labour's landslide defeat of 1931, he became the party's deputy leader. Elected Leader of the Labour Party in 1935, and at first advocating pacificism and opposing re-armament, he became a critic of Neville Chamberlain's policy of appeasement in the lead-up to the Second World War. Attlee took Labour into the wartime coalition government in 1940 and served under Winston Churchill, initially as Lord Privy Seal and then as deputy prime minister from 1942. (Note: Attlee worked backstage to handle much of the detail and organisational work in Parliament, as Churchill took centre stage with his attention on diplomacy, military policy and broader issues.)

The Labour Party, led by Attlee, won a landslide victory in the 1945 general election, on their post-war recovery platform. (Note: The 12% national swing from Conservative to Labour remains the largest achieved by any party at a British general election.) They inherited a country close to bankruptcy following the Second World War and beset by food, housing and resource shortages. Attlee led the construction of the first Labour majority government, which aimed to maintain full employment, a mixed economy and a greatly enlarged system of social services provided by the state. To this end, it undertook the nationalisation of public utilities and major industries, and implemented wide-ranging social reforms, including the passing of the National Insurance Act 1946 and National Assistance Act 1948, the formation of the National Health Service (NHS) in 1948, and the enlargement of public subsidies for council house building.

Attlee's government also reformed trade union legislation, working practices and children's services; it created the National Parks system, passed the New Towns Act 1946 and established the town and country planning system. His foreign policy focused on decolonisation efforts, including the partition of India (1947), the independence of Burma and Ceylon, and the dissolution of the British mandates of Palestine and independence of Transjordan. Attlee and Ernest Bevin encouraged the United States to take a vigorous role in the Cold War. He supported the Marshall Plan to rebuild Western Europe with American money and, in 1949, promoted the NATO military alliance against the Soviet bloc. After leading Labour to a narrow victory at the 1950 general election, he sent British troops to fight alongside South Korea in the Korean War. (Note: Attlee sent British troops to fight in the Malayan Emergency (1948) and the Royal Air Force to participate in the Berlin Airlift, and commissioned an independent nuclear deterrent for the UK.)

Despite Attlee's social reforms and economic programme, the pre-existing wartime shortages of food, housing and resources persisted throughout his premiership, alongside recurrent currency crises and dependence on US aid. His party was narrowly defeated by the Conservatives in the 1951 general election, despite winning the most votes. He continued as Labour leader but retired after losing the 1955 general election and was elevated to the House of Lords, where he served until his death in 1967. In public, he was modest and unassuming, but behind the scenes his depth of knowledge, quiet demeanour, objectivity and pragmatism proved decisive. He is often ranked as one of the greatest British prime ministers, receiving particular praise for his government's welfare state reforms, creation of the NHS, continuation of the "Special Relationship" with the US, and involvement in NATO.

== Early life ==
Clement Richard Attlee was born on 3 January 1883 at Westcott, 18 Portinscale Road in Putney, Surrey (now part of London), into an upper middle class family, the seventh of eight children. His father was Henry Attlee, a solicitor, and his mother was Ellen Bravery Watson, daughter of Thomas Simons Watson, secretary for the Art Union of London. His parents were "committed Anglicans" who read prayers and psalms each morning at breakfast.

Attlee grew up in a two-storey villa with a large garden and tennis court, staffed by three servants and a gardener. His father, a political Liberal, had inherited family interests in milling and brewing, and became a senior partner in the law firm of Druces, also serving a term as president of the Law Society of England and Wales. In 1898 he purchased a 200-acre (81 ha) estate, Comarques in Thorpe-le-Soken, Essex. At the age of nine, Attlee was sent to board at Northaw Place, a boys' preparatory school in Hertfordshire. In 1896 he followed his brothers to Haileybury College, where he was a middling student. He was influenced by the Darwinist views of his housemaster Frederick Webb Headley, and in 1899 he published an attack on striking London cab-drivers in the school magazine, predicting they would soon have to "beg for their fares".

In 1901, Attlee went up to University College, Oxford, reading modern history. He and his brother Tom "were given a generous stipend by their father and embraced the university lifestyle—rowing, reading and socializing". He was later described by a tutor as "level-headed, industrious, dependable man with no brilliance of style ... but with excellent sound judgement". At university he had little interest in politics or economics, later describing his views at this time as "good old fashioned imperialist conservative". He graduated Bachelor of Arts in 1904 with second-class honours.

Attlee then trained as a barrister at the Inner Temple and was called to the bar in March 1906. He worked for a time at his father's law firm Druces and Attlee but did not enjoy the work, and had no particular ambition to succeed in the legal profession. He also played football for non-League club Fleet. Attlee's father died in 1908, leaving an estate valued for probate at £75,394 (equivalent to £7,841,644 in 2025).

=== Early career ===
In 1906, Attlee became a volunteer at Haileybury House, a charitable club for working-class boys in Stepney in the East End of London, run by his old school, and from 1907 to 1909 he served as the club's manager. Until then, his political views had been more conservative. However, he was shocked by the poverty and deprivation he saw while working with the slum children, and came to the view that private charity would never be sufficient to alleviate poverty and that only direct action and income redistribution by the state would have any serious effect. This led him to become a socialist. He joined the Independent Labour Party (ILP) in 1908 and became active in local politics.

Following his father's death in November 1908, Attlee gave up his legal career and devoted himself to politics and social work. His father left him an income of £400 a year (equivalent to £40,000 in 2025). In 1909, he stood unsuccessfully at his first election, as an ILP candidate for Stepney Borough Council. He got a job briefly working as a secretary for Beatrice Webb in 1909, before becoming a secretary for Toynbee Hall. He worked for Webb's campaign of popularisation of the Minority Report as he was very active in Fabian Society circles, in which he would go round visiting many political societies—liberal, conservative and socialist—to explain and popularise the ideas, as well as recruiting lecturers deemed suitable to work on the campaign. In 1911, he was employed by the Government as an "official explainer"—touring the country to explain Chancellor of the Exchequer David Lloyd George's National Insurance Act. He spent the summer of that year touring Essex and Somerset on a bicycle, explaining the Act at public meetings. A year later, he became a lecturer at the London School of Economics, teaching social science and public administration.

=== Military service ===
Following the outbreak of the First World War in August 1914, Attlee applied to join the British Army. Initially his application was turned down, as his age of 31 was seen as being too old; however, he was eventually commissioned as a temporary lieutenant in the 6th (Service) Battalion, South Lancashire Regiment, on 30 September 1914. On 9 February 1915 he was promoted to captain, and on 14 March was appointed battalion adjutant. The 6th South Lancashires were part of the 38th Brigade of the 13th (Western) Division, which served in the Gallipoli campaign in Turkey. Attlee's decision to fight caused a rift between him and his older brother Tom, who, as a conscientious objector, spent much of the war in prison.

After a period spent fighting in Gallipoli, Attlee collapsed after falling ill with dysentery and was put on a ship bound for England to recover. When he woke up he wanted to get back to action as soon as possible, and asked to be let off the ship in Malta, where he stayed in hospital in order to recover. His hospitalisation coincided with the Battle of Sari Bair, which saw a large number of his comrades killed. Upon returning to action, he was informed that his company had been chosen to hold the final lines during the evacuation of Suvla. As such, he was the penultimate man to be evacuated from Suvla Bay, the last being General Stanley Maude.

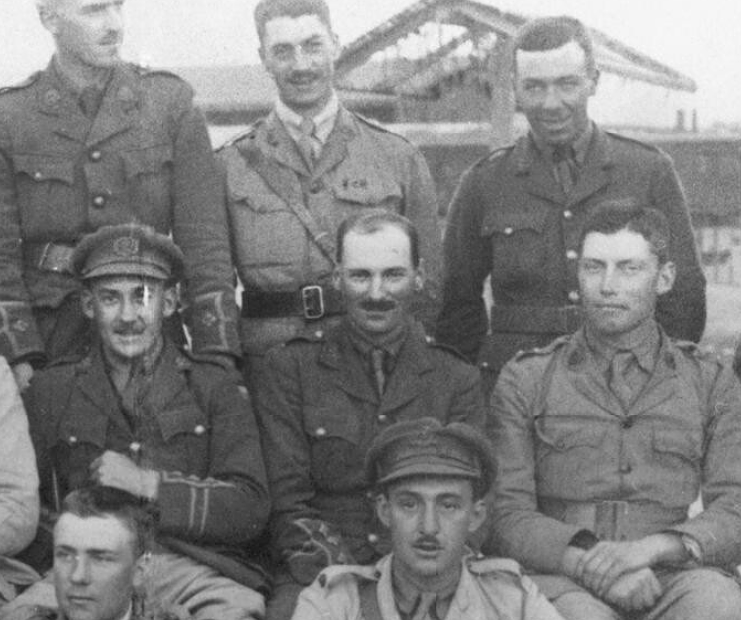
Attlee (seen in the centre) in 1916, aged 33, whilst serving in Mesopotamia

The Gallipoli campaign had been engineered by the First Lord of the Admiralty, Winston Churchill. Although it was unsuccessful, Attlee believed that it was a bold strategy which could have been successful if it had been better implemented on the ground. This led to an admiration for Churchill as a military strategist, something which would make their working relationship in later years productive.

He later served in the Mesopotamian campaign in what is now Iraq, where in April 1916 he was badly wounded, being hit in the leg by shrapnel from friendly fire while storming an enemy trench during the Battle of Hanna. The battle was an unsuccessful attempt to relieve the Siege of Kut, and many of Attlee's fellow soldiers were also wounded or killed. He was sent firstly to India, and then back to the UK to recover. On 18 December 1916 he was transferred to the Heavy Section of the Machine Gun Corps, and 1 March 1917 he was promoted to the temporary rank of major, leading him to be known as "Major Attlee" for much of the inter-war period. He would spend most of 1917 training soldiers at various locations in England. From 2 to 9 July 1917, he was the temporary commanding officer (CO) of the newly formed L (later 10th) Battalion, the Tank Corps at Bovington Camp, Dorset. From 9 July, he assumed command of the 30th Company of the same battalion; however, he did not deploy to France with it in December 1917, as he was transferred back to the South Lancashire Regiment on 28 November.

After fully recovering from his injuries, he was sent to France in June 1918 to serve on the Western Front for the final months of the war. After being discharged from the Army in January 1919, he returned to Stepney, and returned to his old job lecturing part-time at the London School of Economics.

== Early political career ==
=== Local politics ===
Attlee returned to local politics in the immediate post-war period, becoming mayor of the Metropolitan Borough of Stepney, one of London's most deprived inner-city boroughs, in 1919. During his time as mayor, the council undertook action to tackle slum landlords who charged high rents but refused to spend money on keeping their property in habitable condition. The council served and enforced legal orders on homeowners to repair their property. It also appointed health visitors and sanitary inspectors, reducing the infant mortality rate, and took action to find work for returning unemployed ex-servicemen.

In 1920, while mayor, he wrote his first book, The Social Worker, which set out many of the principles that informed his political philosophy and that were to underpin the actions of his government in later years. The book attacked the idea that looking after the poor could be left to voluntary action. He wrote that:

In a civilised community, although it may be composed of self-reliant individuals, there will be some persons who will be unable at some period of their lives to look after themselves, and the question of what is to happen to them may be solved in three ways – they may be neglected, they may be cared for by the organised community as of right, or they may be left to the goodwill of individuals in the community. [...] Charity is only possible without loss of dignity between equals. A right established by law, such as that to an old age pension, is less galling than an allowance made by a rich man to a poor one, dependent on his view of the recipient's character, and terminable at his caprice.

In 1921, George Lansbury, the Labour mayor of the neighbouring borough of Poplar, and future Labour Party leader, launched the Poplar Rates Rebellion; a campaign of disobedience seeking to equalise the poor relief burden across all the London boroughs. Attlee, who was a personal friend of Lansbury, strongly supported this. However, Herbert Morrison, the Labour mayor of nearby Hackney, and one of the main figures in the London Labour Party, strongly denounced Lansbury and the rebellion. During this period, Attlee developed a lifelong dislike of Morrison.

=== Member of Parliament ===
At the 1922 UK general election, Attlee became the Member of Parliament (MP) for the constituency of Limehouse in Stepney. At the time, he admired Ramsay MacDonald and helped him get elected as Leader of the Labour Party at the 1922 leadership election. He served as MacDonald's Parliamentary Private Secretary for the brief 1922 parliament. His first taste of ministerial office came in 1924, when he served as Under-Secretary of State for War in the short-lived first Labour government, led by Ramsay MacDonald.

Attlee opposed the 1926 General Strike, believing that strike action should not be used as a political weapon. However, when it happened, he did not attempt to undermine it. At the time of the strike, he was chairman of the Stepney Borough Electricity Committee. He negotiated a deal with the Electrical Trade Union so that they would continue to supply power to hospitals, but would end supplies to factories. One firm, Scammell and Nephew Ltd, took a civil action against Attlee and the other Labour members of the committee (although not against the Conservative members who had also supported this). The court found against Attlee and his fellow councillors and they were ordered to pay £300 in damages. The decision was later reversed on appeal, but the financial problems caused by the episode almost forced Attlee out of politics.

In 1927, he was appointed a member of the multi-party Simon Commission, a royal commission set up to examine the possibility of granting self-rule to India. Due to the time he needed to devote to the commission, and contrary to a promise MacDonald made to Attlee to induce him to serve on the commission, he was not initially offered a ministerial post in the second Labour government, which entered office after the 1929 general election. Attlee's service on the Commission equipped him with a thorough exposure to India and many of its political leaders. By 1933, he argued that British rule was alien to India and was unable to make the social and economic reforms necessary for India's progress. He became the British leader most sympathetic to Indian independence (as a dominion), preparing him for his future role in deciding on independence in 1947.

In May 1930, Labour MP Oswald Mosley left the party after its rejection of his proposals for solving the unemployment problem, and Attlee was given Mosley's post of Chancellor of the Duchy of Lancaster. In March 1931, he became Postmaster General, a post he held for five months until August, when the Labour government collapsed, after failing to agree on how to tackle the financial crisis of the Great Depression. That month MacDonald and a few of his allies formed a National Government with the Conservatives and Liberals, leading them to be expelled from Labour. MacDonald offered Attlee a job in the National Government, but he turned down the offer and opted to stay loyal to the main Labour Party.

After Ramsay MacDonald formed the National Government, Labour was deeply divided. Attlee had long been close to MacDonald and now felt betrayed; as did most Labour politicians. During the course of the second Labour government, Attlee had become increasingly disillusioned with MacDonald, whom he came to regard as vain and incompetent; and of whom he later wrote scathingly in his autobiography. He would write:

In the old days I had looked up to MacDonald as a great leader. He had a fine presence and great oratorical power. The unpopular line which he took during the First World War seemed to mark him as a man of character. Despite his mishandling of the Red Letter episode, I had not appreciated his defects until he took office a second time. I then realised his reluctance to take positive action and noted with dismay his increasing vanity and snobbery, while his habit of telling me, a junior Minister, the poor opinion he had of all his Cabinet colleagues made an unpleasant impression. I had not, however, expected that he would perpetrate the greatest betrayal in the political history of this country ... The shock to the Party was very great, especially to the loyal workers of the rank-and-file who had made great sacrifices for these men.

=== Deputy Labour Leader ===
The 1931 UK general election proved disastrous for the Labour Party, which lost over 200 seats, returning only 52 MPs to Parliament. The vast majority of the party's senior figures, including the Leader Arthur Henderson, lost their seats. Attlee narrowly retained his Limehouse seat, with his majority being slashed from 7,288 votes two years previously, to just 551 votes. He was one of only three Labour MPs who had experience of government to retain their seats, along with George Lansbury and Stafford Cripps. Accordingly, Lansbury was elected Leader unopposed, with Attlee as his deputy.

Most of the remaining Labour MPs after their worst defeat in history were elderly trade-union officials who could not contribute much to debates; Lansbury was in his 70s, and Stafford Cripps – another main figure of the Labour front-bench who had entered Parliament in January 1931 – lacked parliamentary experience. As one of the most capable and experienced of the remaining Labour MPs, Attlee therefore shouldered a lot of the burden of providing an opposition to the National Government in the years 1931-35; during this time he had to extend his knowledge of subjects which he had not studied in any depth before (such as finance and foreign affairs) in order to provide an effective opposition to the government.

Attlee effectively served as Labour's acting-leader for nine months from December 1933, after Lansbury fractured his thigh in an accident; this raised Attlee's public profile considerably. It was during this period, however, that personal financial problems almost forced Attlee to quit politics altogether. His wife had become ill, and at that time there was no separate salary for the Leader of the Opposition. On the verge of resigning from Parliament, he was persuaded to stay by Stafford Cripps, a wealthy socialist, who agreed to make a donation to party funds to pay him an additional salary until Lansbury could take over again.

During 1932–33, Attlee flirted with, and then drew back from radicalism – influenced by Stafford Cripps, who was then on the radical wing of the party. He was briefly a member of the Socialist League, which had been formed by former Independent Labour Party (ILP) members who opposed the ILP's disaffiliation from the main Labour Party in 1932. At one point he agreed with the proposition put forward by Cripps that gradual reform was inadequate and that a socialist government would have to pass an emergency powers act, allowing it to rule by decree to overcome any opposition by vested interests until it was safe to restore democracy. He admired Oliver Cromwell's strong-armed rule and use of major generals to control England. After looking more closely at Hitler, Mussolini, Stalin, and even his former colleague Oswald Mosley (leader of the new blackshirt fascist movement in Britain), Attlee retreated from radicalism, distanced himself from the League, and argued instead that the Labour Party must adhere to constitutional methods and stand forthright for democracy and against totalitarianism either of the left or of the right. He always supported the crown, and as Prime Minister was close to King George VI.

=== Leader of the Opposition ===
George Lansbury, a committed pacifist, resigned as the Leader of the Labour Party at the 1935 Party Conference on 8 October, after delegates voted in favour of sanctions against Italy for its aggression against Abyssinia. Lansbury had strongly opposed the policy, and felt unable to continue leading the party. Taking advantage of the disarray in the Labour Party, the Prime Minister Stanley Baldwin announced on 19 October that a general election would be held on 14 November. With no time for a leadership contest, the party agreed that Attlee should serve as interim leader, on the understanding that a leadership election would be held after the general election. Attlee therefore led Labour through the 1935 election, which saw the party stage a partial comeback from its disastrous 1931 performance, winning 38 per cent of the vote, the highest share Labour had won up to that point, and gaining over one hundred seats.

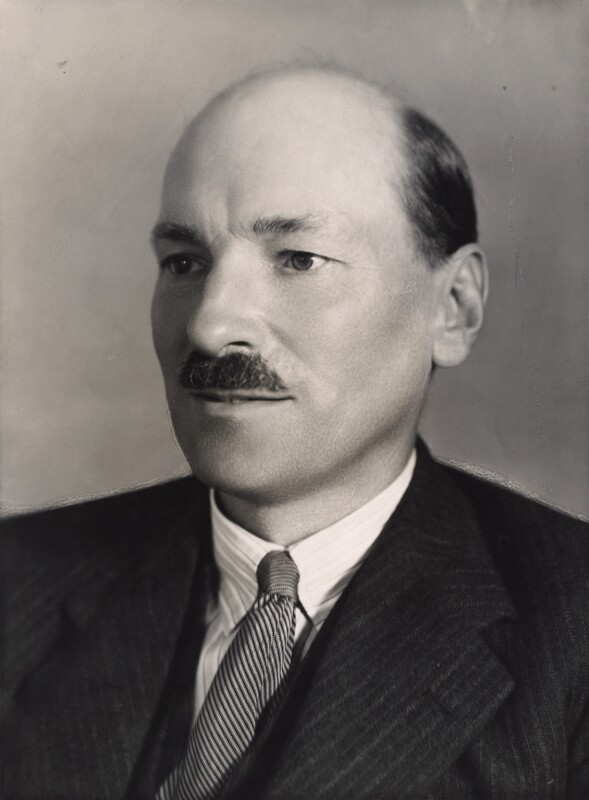
Attlee in 1938

Attlee stood in the subsequent leadership election, held soon afterward, in which he was opposed by Herbert Morrison – who had just re-entered parliament in the recent election – and Arthur Greenwood. Morrison was seen as the favourite, but was distrusted by many sections of the party, especially the left wing. Greenwood, meanwhile, was a popular figure in the party; however, his leadership bid was severely hampered by his alcohol problem. Attlee was able to come across as a competent and unifying figure, particularly having already led the party through a general election. He went on to come first in both the first and second ballots, formally being elected Leader of the Labour Party on 3 December 1935.

Throughout the 1920s and most of the 1930s, the Labour Party's official policy had been to oppose rearmament, instead supporting internationalism and collective security under the League of Nations. At the 1934 Labour Party Conference, Attlee declared that, "We have absolutely abandoned any idea of nationalist loyalty. We are deliberately putting a world order before our loyalty to our own country. We say we want to see put on the statute book something which will make our people citizens of the world before they are citizens of this country". During a debate on defence in the House of Commons a year later, Attlee said "We are told (in the White Paper) that there is danger against which we have to guard ourselves. We do not think you can do it by national defence. We think you can only do it by moving forward to a new world. A world of law, the abolition of national armaments with a world force and a world economic system. I shall be told that that is quite impossible". Shortly after those comments, Adolf Hitler proclaimed that German rearmament offered no threat to world peace. Attlee responded the next day noting that Hitler's speech, although containing unfavourable references to the Soviet Union, created "A chance to call a halt in the armaments race ... We do not think that our answer to Herr Hitler should be just rearmament. We are in an age of rearmaments, but we on this side cannot accept that position".

Attlee played little part in the events that would lead up to the abdication of Edward VIII, for despite Baldwin's threat to step down if Edward attempted to remain on the throne after marrying Wallis Simpson, Labour was widely accepted not to be a viable alternative government, owing to the National Government's overwhelming majority in the Commons. Attlee, along with Liberal leader Archibald Sinclair, was eventually consulted with by Baldwin on 24 November 1936, and Attlee agreed with both Baldwin and Sinclair that Edward could not remain on the throne, firmly eliminating any prospect of any alternative government forming were Baldwin to resign.

In April 1936, the Chancellor of the Exchequer, Neville Chamberlain, introduced a Budget which increased the amount spent on the armed forces. Attlee made a radio broadcast in opposition to it, saying:

[The budget] was the natural expression of the character of the present Government. There was hardly any increase allowed for the services which went to build up the life of the people, education and health. Everything was devoted to piling up the instruments of death. The Chancellor expressed great regret that he should have to spend so much on armaments, but said that it was absolutely necessary and was due only to the actions of other nations. One would think to listen to him that the Government had no responsibility for the state of world affairs. [...] The Government has now resolved to enter upon an arms race, and the people will have to pay for their mistake in believing that it could be trusted to carry out a policy of peace. [...] This is a War Budget. We can look in the future for no advance in Social Legislation. All available resources are to be devoted to armaments.

In June 1936, the Conservative MP Duff Cooper called for an Anglo-French alliance against possible German aggression and called for all parties to support one. Attlee condemned this: "We say that any suggestion of an alliance of this kind—an alliance in which one country is bound to another, right or wrong, by some overwhelming necessity—is contrary to the spirit of the League of Nations, is contrary to the Covenant, is contrary to Locarno is contrary to the obligations which this country has undertaken, and is contrary to the professed policy of this Government". At the Labour Party conference at Edinburgh in October Attlee reiterated that "There can be no question of our supporting the Government in its rearmament policy".

However, with the rising threat from Nazi Germany, and the ineffectiveness of the League of Nations, this policy eventually lost credibility. By 1937, Labour had jettisoned its pacifist position and came to support rearmament and oppose Neville Chamberlain's policy of appeasement. However Attlee and the Labour Party strongly opposed conscription when it was passed in April 1939.

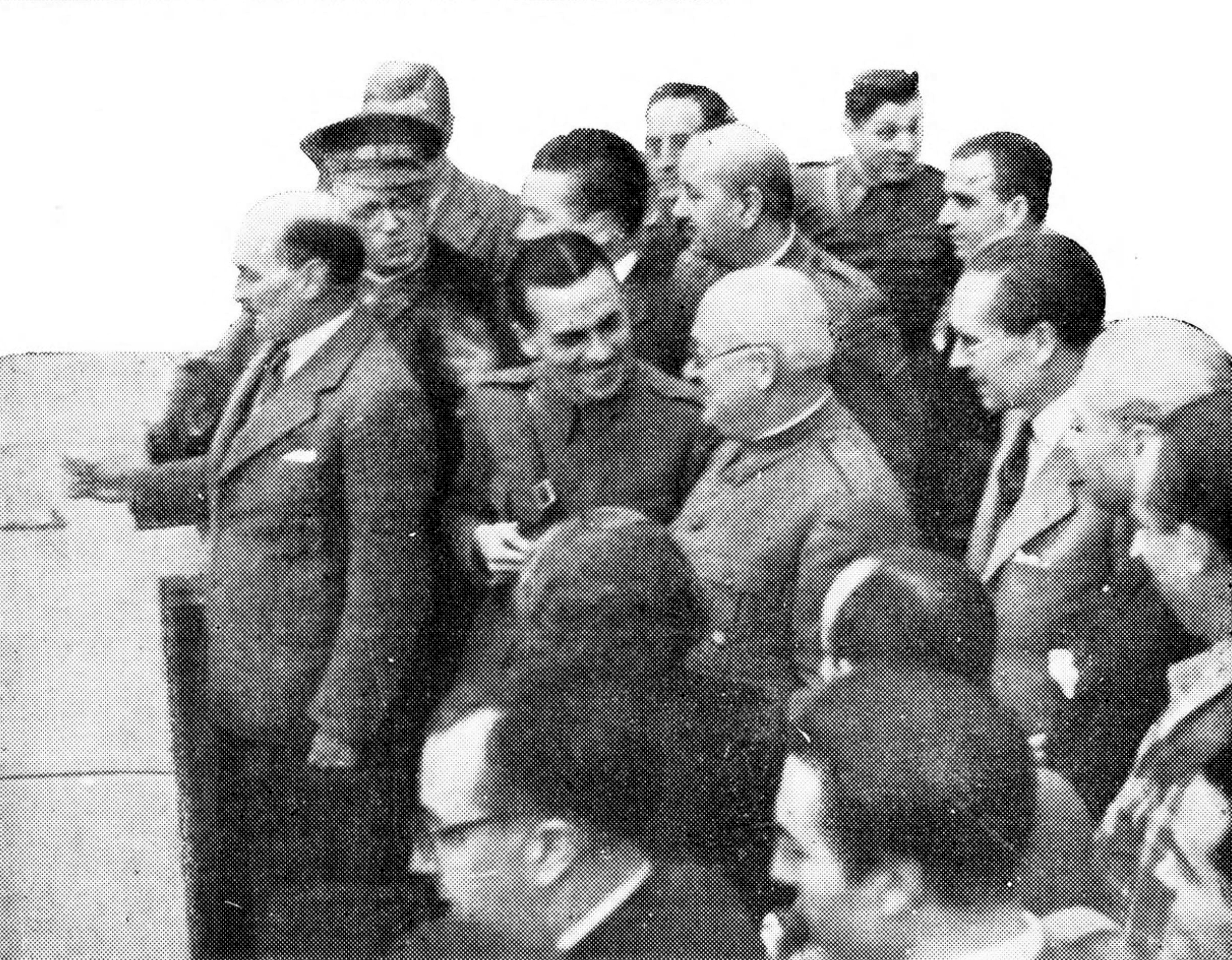
Attlee with General José Miaja and other members of the General Staff and Popular Front Committee in Madrid, December 1937

At the end of 1937, Attlee and a party of three Labour MPs visited Spain and visited the British Battalion of the International Brigades fighting in the Spanish Civil War. One of the companies was named the "Major Attlee Company" in his honour. Attlee was supportive of the Republican government in Spain, and at the 1937 Labour conference moved the wider Labour Party towards opposing what he considered the "farce" of the Non-Intervention Committee organised by the British and French governments. In the House of Commons, Attlee stated: "I cannot understand the delusion that if Franco wins with Italian and German aid, he will immediately become independent. I think it is a ridiculous proposition." Dalton, the Labour Party's spokesman on foreign policy, also thought that Franco would ally with Germany and Italy. However, Franco's subsequent behaviour proved it was not such a ridiculous proposition. As Dalton later acknowledged, Franco skilfully maintained Spanish neutrality, whereas Hitler would likely have occupied Spain if Franco had lost the Civil War.

In 1938, Attlee opposed the Munich Agreement, in which Chamberlain negotiated with Hitler to give Germany the German-speaking parts of Czechoslovakia, the Sudetenland:

We all feel relief that war has not come this time... we cannot, however, feel that peace has been established, but that we have nothing but an armistice in a state of war. We have been unable to go in for care-free rejoicing. We have felt that we are in the midst of a tragedy... [and] humiliation. This has not been a victory for reason and humanity. It has been a victory for brute force. At every stage of the proceedings there have been time limits laid down... [the] terms laid down as ultimata. We have seen to-day a gallant, civilised and democratic people betrayed and handed over to a ruthless despotism... The events of these last few days constitute one of the greatest diplomatic defeats that this country and France have ever sustained. There can be no doubt that it is a tremendous victory for Herr Hitler. Without firing a shot, by the mere display of military force, he has achieved a dominating position in Europe which Germany failed to win after four years of war. He has overturned the balance of power in Europe... [and] destroyed the last fortress of democracy in Eastern Europe which stood in the way of his ambition. He has opened his way to the food, the oil and the resources which he requires in order to consolidate his military power, and he has successfully defeated and reduced to impotence the forces that might have stood against the rule of violence. [...] The cause [of the crisis which we have undergone] was not the existence of minorities in Czechoslovakia; it was not that the position of the Sudeten Germans had become intolerable. It was not the wonderful principle of self-determination. It was because Herr Hitler had decided that the time was ripe for another step forward in his design to dominate Europe... The minorities question is no new one. [...] [And] short of a drastic and entire reshuffling of these populations there is no possible solution to the problem of minorities in Europe except toleration.

However, the new Czechoslovak state did not provide equal rights to the Slovaks and Sudeten Germans, with the historian Arnold J. Toynbee already having noted that "for the Germans, Magyars and Poles, who account between them for more than one quarter of the whole population, the present regime in Czechoslovakia is not essentially different from the regimes in the surrounding countries". Anthony Eden in the Munich debate acknowledged that there had been "discrimination, even severe discrimination" against the Sudeten Germans.

In 1937, Attlee wrote a book entitled The Labour Party in Perspective that sold fairly well in which he set out some of his views. He argued that there was no point in Labour compromising on its socialist principles in the belief that this would achieve electoral success. He wrote: "I find that the proposition often reduces itself to this – that if the Labour Party would drop its socialism and adopt a Liberal platform, many Liberals would be pleased to support it. I have heard it said more than once that if Labour would only drop its policy of nationalisation everyone would be pleased, and it would soon obtain a majority. I am convinced it would be fatal for the Labour Party." He also wrote that there was no point in "watering down Labour's socialist creed in order to attract new adherents who cannot accept the full socialist faith. On the contrary, I believe that it is only a clear and bold policy that will attract this support".

In the late 1930s, Attlee sponsored a Jewish mother and her two children, enabling them to leave Germany in 1939 and move to the UK. On arriving in Britain, Attlee invited one of the children into his home in Stanmore, north-west London, where he stayed for several months.

== Deputy Prime Minister ==
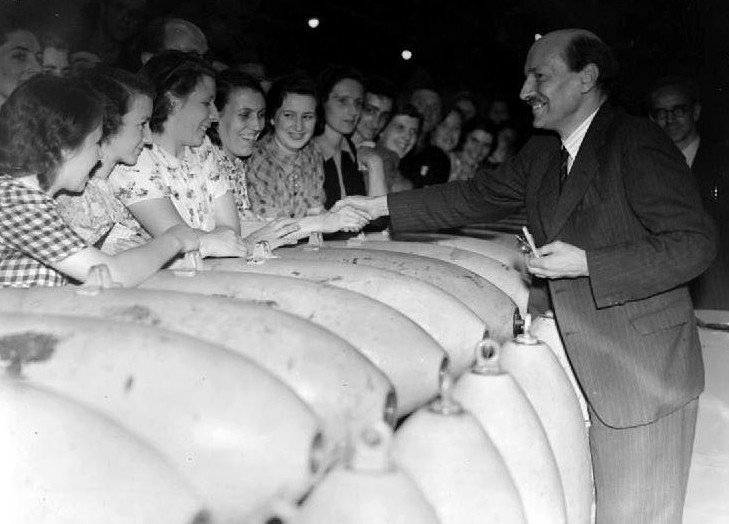
Attlee as Lord Privy Seal, visiting a munitions factory in 1941

Attlee remained as Leader of the Opposition when the Second World War broke out in September 1939. The ensuing disastrous Norwegian campaign would result in a motion of no confidence in Neville Chamberlain. Although Chamberlain survived this, the reputation of his administration was so badly and publicly damaged that it became clear a coalition government would be necessary. Even if Attlee had personally been prepared to serve under Chamberlain in an emergency coalition government, he would never have been able to carry Labour with him. Consequently, Chamberlain tendered his resignation, and Labour and the Conservatives entered a coalition government led by Winston Churchill on 10 May 1940, with Attlee joining the Cabinet as Lord Privy Seal on 12 May.

Attlee and Churchill quickly agreed that the War Cabinet would consist of three Conservatives (initially Churchill, Chamberlain and Lord Halifax) and two Labour members (initially himself and Arthur Greenwood) and that Labour should have slightly more than one third of the posts in the coalition government. Attlee and Greenwood played a vital role in supporting Churchill during a series of War Cabinet debates over whether or not to negotiate peace terms with Hitler following the Fall of France in May 1940; both supported Churchill and gave him the majority he needed in the War Cabinet to continue Britain's resistance.

Only Attlee and Churchill remained in the War Cabinet from the formation of the Government of National Unity in May 1940 through to the election in 1945. Attlee was initially the Lord Privy Seal, before becoming Britain's first ever Deputy Prime Minister in 1942, as well as becoming the Dominions Secretary and Lord President of the Council on 28 September 1943.

Attlee himself played a generally low-key but vital role in the wartime government, working behind the scenes and in committees to ensure the smooth operation of government. Attlee was also pivotal in the British war effort on the home front. In the coalition government, three inter-connected committees effectively ran the country. Churchill chaired the first two, the War cabinet and the Defence Committee, with Attlee deputising for him in these, and answering for the government in Parliament when Churchill was absent. Attlee himself instituted, and later chaired the third body, the Lord President's Committee, which was responsible for overseeing domestic affairs. As Churchill was most concerned with overseeing the war effort, this arrangement suited both men. Attlee himself had largely been responsible for creating these arrangements with Churchill's backing, streamlining the machinery of government and abolishing many committees. He also acted as a conciliator in the government, smoothing over tensions which frequently arose between Labour and Conservative Ministers.

On the many occasions during World War II when Churchill was overseas, Attlee's role as Deputy Prime Minister did give him responsibilities in the conduct of the war. Whilst Churchill was travelling to the Yalta conference, Attlee gave the political authorisation for the now-controversial bombing of Dresden, acting on a Soviet request based on expected German troop movements, as discovered by Bletchley Park codebreaking.

Many Labour activists were baffled by the top leadership role for a man they regarded as having little charisma; Beatrice Webb wrote in her diary in early 1940:

He looked and spoke like an insignificant elderly clerk, without distinction in the voice, manner or substance of his discourse. To realise that this little nonentity is the Parliamentary Leader of the Labour Party ... and presumably the future P.M. [Prime Minister] is pitiable".

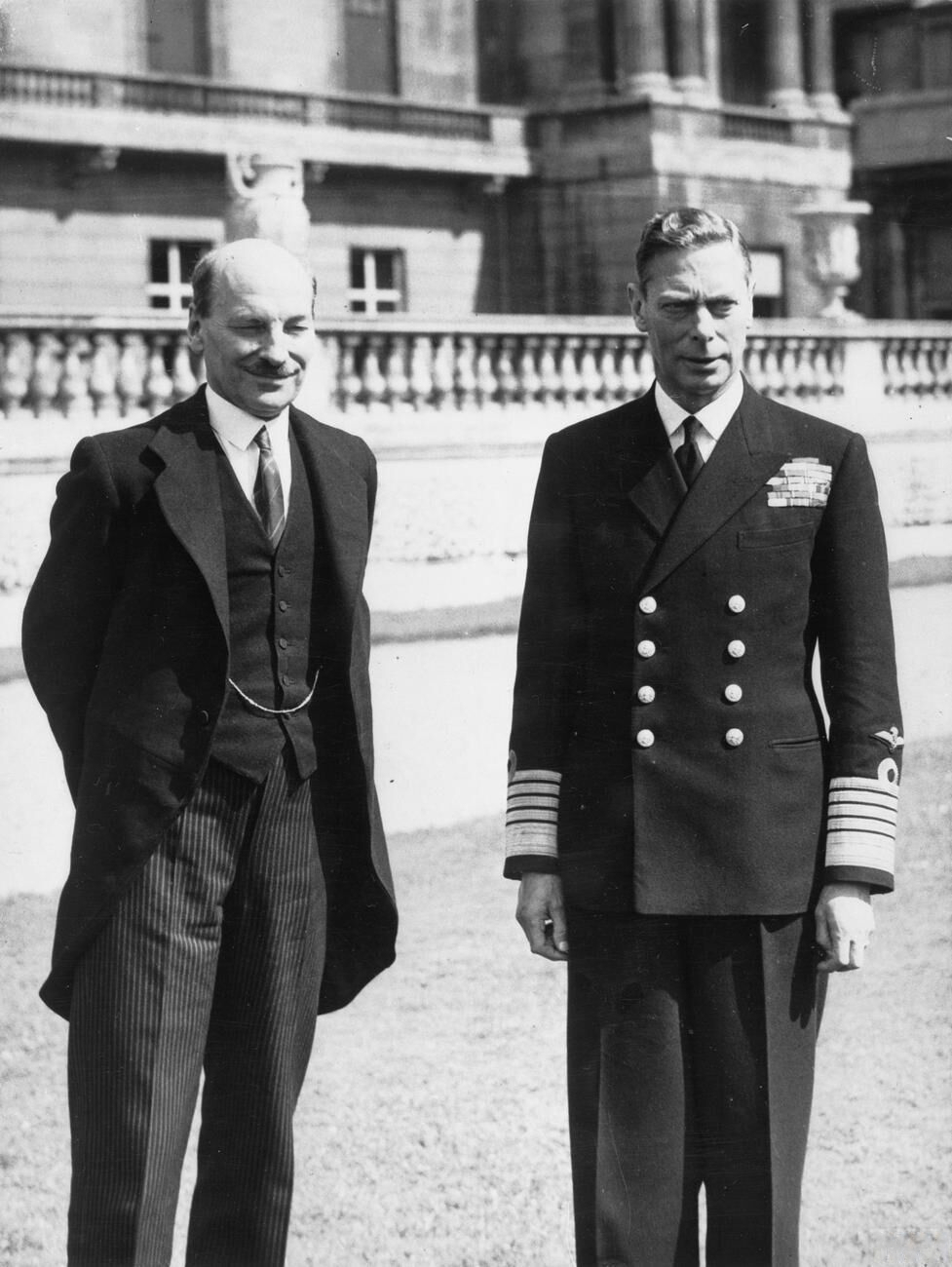
Attlee meeting King George VI following Labour's 1945 election victory

=== 1945 election ===
Following the defeat of Nazi Germany and the end of the War in Europe in May 1945, Attlee and Churchill favoured the coalition government remaining in place until Japan had been defeated. However, Herbert Morrison made it clear that the Labour Party would not be willing to accept this, and Churchill was forced to tender his resignation as Prime Minister and call an immediate election.

The war had set in motion profound social changes within Britain and had ultimately led to a widespread popular desire for social reform. This mood was epitomised in the Beveridge Report of 1942, by the Liberal economist William Beveridge. The Report assumed that the maintenance of full employment would be the aim of post-war governments, and that this would provide the basis for the welfare state. Immediately upon its release, it sold hundreds of thousands of copies. All major parties committed themselves to fulfilling this aim, but most historians say that Attlee's Labour Party was seen by the electorate as the party most likely to follow it through.

Labour campaigned on the theme of "Let Us Face the Future", positioning themselves as the party best placed to rebuild Britain following the war, and were widely viewed as having run a strong and positive campaign, while the Conservative campaign centred entirely on Churchill. Despite opinion polls indicating a strong Labour lead, opinion polls were then viewed as a novelty which had not proven their worth, and most commentators expected that Churchill's prestige and status as a "war hero" would ensure a comfortable Conservative victory. Before polling day, The Manchester Guardian surmised that "the chances of Labour sweeping the country and obtaining a clear majority ... are pretty remote". The News of the World predicted a working Conservative majority, while in Glasgow a pundit forecast the result as Conservatives 360, Labour 220, Others 60. Churchill, however, made some costly errors during the campaign. In particular, his suggestion during one radio broadcast that a future Labour Government would require "some form of a gestapo" to implement their policies was widely regarded as being in very bad taste and massively backfired.

When the results of the election were announced on 26 July, they came as a surprise to most, including Attlee himself. Labour had won power by a huge landslide, winning 49.7 per cent of the vote to the Conservatives' 36.2 per cent. This gave them 393 seats in the House of Commons, a working majority of 146. This was the first time in history that the Labour Party had won a majority in Parliament. When Attlee went to see King George VI at Buckingham Palace to be appointed prime minister, the notoriously laconic Attlee and the famously tongue-tied King stood in silence; Attlee finally volunteered the remark, "I've won the election". The King replied "I know. I heard it on the Six O'Clock News".

== Prime Minister ==
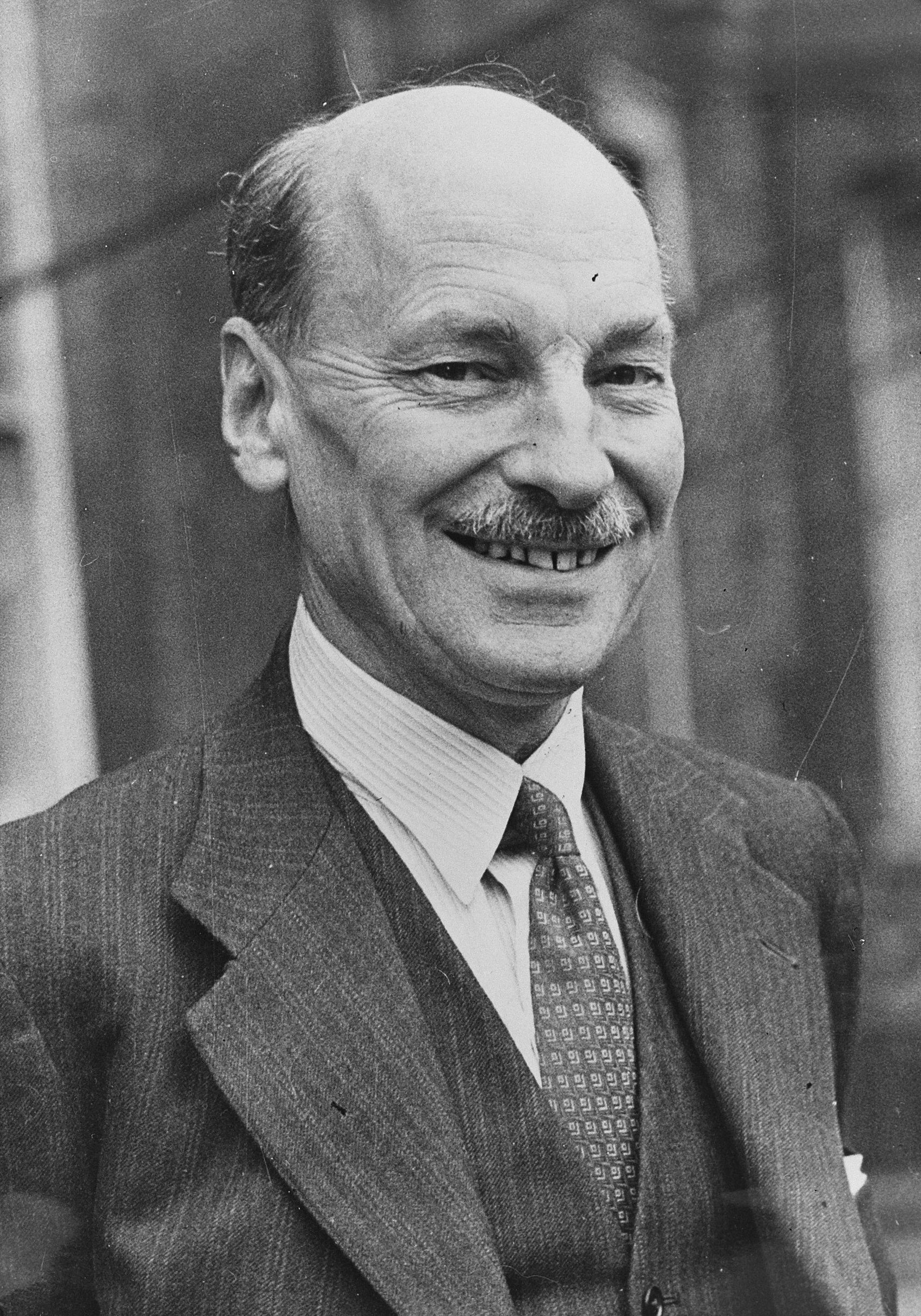
- Attlee in 1950
- Premiership of Clement Attlee; 26 July 1945 – 26 October 1951
- Monarch: George VI
- Cabinet: Attlee ministry
- Party: Labour
- Election: 1945; 1950
- Seat: 10 Downing Street
- Coat of Arms of HM Government

=== Domestic policy ===
Francis (1995) argues there was consensus both in the Labour's national executive committee and at party conferences on a definition of socialism that stressed moral improvement as well as material improvement. The Attlee government was committed to rebuilding British society as an ethical commonwealth, using public ownership and controls to abolish extremes of wealth and poverty. Labour's ideology contrasted sharply with the contemporary Conservative Party's defence of individualism, inherited privileges, and income inequality. On 5 July 1948, Clement Attlee replied to a letter dated 22 June from James Murray and ten other MPs who raised concerns about West Indians who arrived on board the HMT Empire Windrush. As for the prime minister himself, he was not much focused on economic policy, letting others handle the issues.

==== Nationalisation ====
Attlee's government also carried out their manifesto commitment for nationalisation of basic industries and public utilities. The Bank of England and civil aviation were nationalised in 1946. Coal mining, the railways, road haulage, canals and Cable and Wireless were nationalised in 1947, and electricity and gas followed in 1948. The steel industry was nationalised in 1951. By 1951 about 20 per cent of the British economy had been taken into public ownership.

Nationalisation failed to provide workers with a greater say in the running of the industries in which they worked. It did, however, bring about significant material gains for workers in the form of higher wages, reduced working hours, and improvements in working conditions, especially in regards to safety. As historian Eric Shaw noted of the years following nationalisation, the electricity and gas supply companies became "impressive models of public enterprise" in terms of efficiency, and the National Coal Board was not only profitable, but working conditions for miners had significantly improved as well.

Within a few years of nationalisation, a number of progressive measures had been carried out which did much to improve conditions in the mines, including better pay, a five-day working week, a national safety scheme (with proper standards at all the collieries), a ban on boys under the age of 16 going underground, the introduction of training for newcomers before going down to the coalface, and the making of pithead baths into a standard facility.

The newly established National Coal Board offered sick pay and holiday pay to miners. As noted by Martin Francis:

Union leaders saw nationalisation as a means to pursue a more advantageous position within a framework of continued conflict, rather than as an opportunity to replace the old adversarial form of industrial relations. Moreover, most workers in nationalised industries exhibited an essentially instrumentalist attitude, favouring public ownership because it secured job security and improved wages rather than because it promised the creation of a new set of socialist relationships in the workplace.

==== Health ====
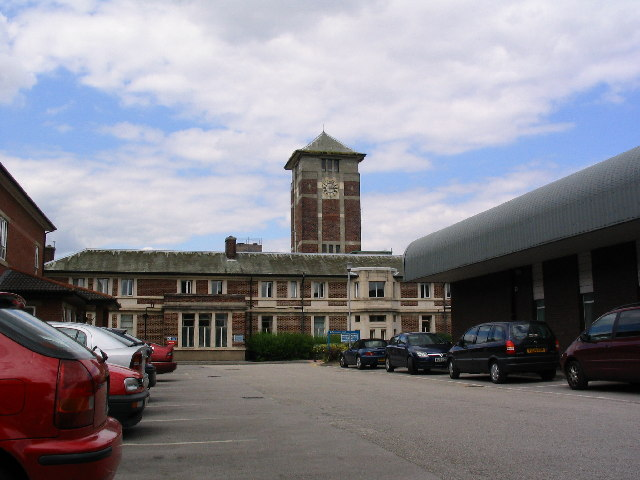
Trafford General Hospital, known as the birthplace of the NHS

Attlee's Health Minister, Aneurin Bevan, fought hard against the general disapproval of the medical establishment, including the British Medical Association, by creating the National Health Service in 1948. This was a publicly funded healthcare system, which offered treatment for all, regardless of income, free of charge at the point of use. Reflecting pent-up demand that had long existed for medical services, the NHS treated some 8.5 million dental patients and dispensed more than 5 million pairs of spectacles during its first year of operation.

Consultants benefited from the new system by being paid salaries that provided an acceptable standard of living without the need for them to resort to private practice. The NHS brought major improvements in the health of working-class people, with deaths from diphtheria, pneumonia, and tuberculosis significantly reduced. Although there were often disputes about its organisation and funding, British political parties continued to voice their general support for the NHS in order to remain electable.

In the field of health care, funds were allocated to modernisation and extension schemes aimed at improving administrative efficiency. Improvements were made in nursing accommodation in order to recruit more nurses and reduce labour shortages which were keeping 60,000 beds out of use, and efforts were made to reduce the imbalance "between an excess of fever and tuberculosis (TB) beds and a shortage of maternity beds".

BCG vaccinations were introduced for the protection of medical students, midwives, nurses, and contacts of patients with tuberculosis, a pension scheme was set up for employees of the newly established NHS, The National Health Service (Superannuation) Regulations 1947 laid down a number of provisions for beneficiaries including an officer's pension and retiring allowance, an injury allowance, a short service gratuity, a death gratuity, a widow's pension, and supplementary payments in the case of special classes of officers. Provision was also made for the allocation of part of pension or injury allowance to spouse of dependent.

The Radioactive Substances Act 1948 set out general provisions to control radioactive substances. Numerous lesser reforms were also introduced, some of which were of great benefit to certain segments of British society, such as the mentally deficient and the blind. Between 1948 and 1951, Attlee's government increased spending on health from £6 billion to £11 billion: an increase of over 80%, and from 2.1% to 3.6% of GDP.

==== Welfare ====
The government set about implementing the Wartime plans of William Beveridge's plans for the creation of a 'cradle to grave' welfare state, and set in place an entirely new system of social security. Among the most important pieces of legislation was the National Insurance Act 1946, in which people in work paid a flat rate of national insurance. In return, they (and the wives of male contributors) were eligible for flat-rate pensions, sickness benefit, unemployment benefit, and funeral benefit. Various provisions were included in the National Insurance Act 1946 including unemployment and sickness benefit, maternity grant and attendance allowance, maternity allowance, widow's benefit, widow's pensions in special cases, guardian's allowance, retirement pension, and death grant.

Various other pieces of legislation provided for child benefit and support for people with no other source of income. In 1949, unemployment, sickness and maternity benefits were exempted from taxation.

A block grant introduced in 1948 helped the social services provided by local authorities. Personal Social Services or welfare services were developed in 1948 for individual and families in general, particularly special groups such as the mentally disordered, deprived children, the elderly, and the handicapped.

The Attlee Government increased pensions and other benefits, with pensions raised to become more of a living income than they had ever been. War pensions and allowances (for both World Wars) were increased by the Pensions (Increase) Act 1947, which gave the wounded man with an allowance for his wife and children if he married after he had been wounded, thereby removing a grievance of more than twenty years standing. Other improvements were made in war pensions during Attlee's tenure as prime minister. A Constant Attendance Allowance was tripled, an Unemployability Allowance was tripled from 10s to 30s a week, and a special hardship allowance of up to £1 a week was introduced. In addition, the 1951 Budget made further improvements in the supplementary allowances for many war pensioners. From 1945 onwards, three out of every four pension claims had been successful, whilst after the First World War only one pension claim in three was allowed. Under the Superannuation (Miscellaneous Provisions) Act 1948, employees of a body representative of local authorities or of the officers of local authorities could be admitted "on suitable terms to the superannuation fund of a local authority". In 1951, a comforts allowance was introduced that was automatically paid to war pensioners "receiving unemployability supplement and constant attendance allowance".

The Personal injuries (Civilians) Scheme of 1947 included various benefits such as an exceptional maximum rate of constant attendance allowance of 40s a week, and an allowance for wear and tear of clothing caused by the use of artificial limbs and appliances. In addition, allowances payable while a pensioner underwent inpatient treatment "are normally no longer subject to a deduction in respect of decreased home expenditure". Various changes were also made in respect of gainfully employed persons who sustained war injuries and civil defence volunteers who war service injuries. These included the provision of allowances for the wife and children for injured persons receiving injury allowance or disablement pension, amendments to the provisions for an allowance to a pensioner deemed unemployable by reason of his pensioned disablement "to secure that he receives in the aggregate by way of unemployability allowance and any social service benefits for which he is eligible at least 20s. a week in addition to his pension", increases in the allowance payable for a wife of a person receiving treatment allowance, unemployability allowance or injury allowance under certain conditions and "if no allowance is payable for a wife, an allowance may be granted for a dependant adult", and a social hardship allowance for partially disabled men "who, though not unemployable, is prevented by his pensioned disablement from resuming his former occupation or taking up one of equivalent standard". Also, "Where a man dies as the direct result of a qualifying injury his widow may be awarded a pension (with allowances for his children) without regard to the date of marriage."

A more extensive system of social welfare benefits had been established by the Attlee Government, which did much to reduce acute social deprivation. The cumulative impact of the Attlee's Government's health and welfare policies was such that all the indices of health (such as statistics of school medical or dental officers, or of medical officers of health) showed signs of improvement, with continual improvements in survival rates for infants and increased life expectancy for the elderly. The success of the Attlee Government's welfare legislation in reducing poverty was such that, in the general election of 1950, according to one study, "Labour propaganda could make much of the claim that social security had eradicated the most abject destitution of the 1930s".

==== Economy ====
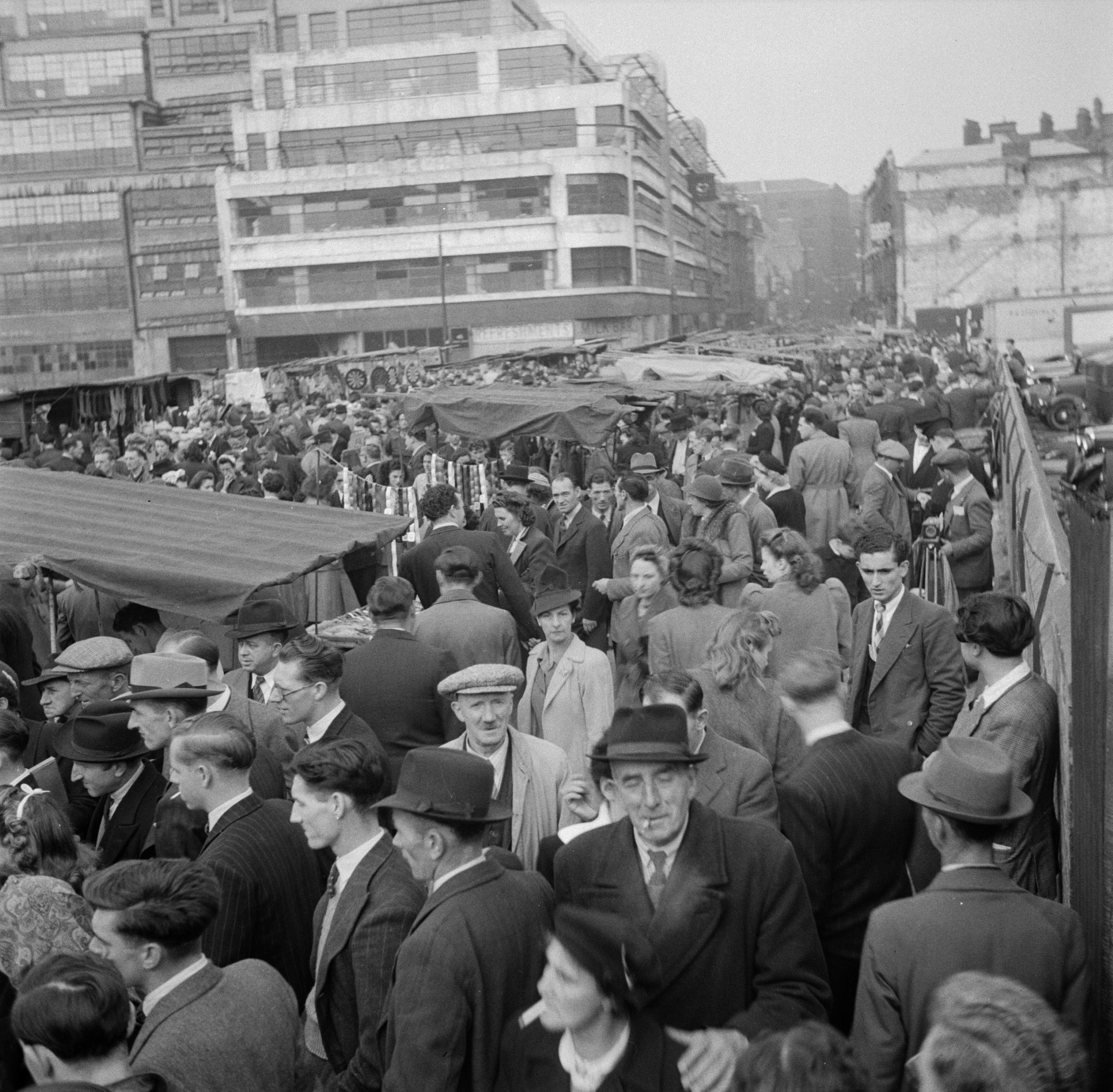
Petticoat Lane Market in London, 1947

The most significant problem facing Attlee and his ministers remained the economy, as the war effort had left Britain nearly bankrupt. Overseas investments had been used up to pay for the war. The transition to a peacetime economy, and the maintaining of strategic military commitments abroad led to continuous and severe problems with the balance of trade. This resulted in strict rationing of food and other essential goods continuing in the post war period to force a reduction in consumption in an effort to limit imports, boost exports, and stabilise the Pound Sterling so that Britain could trade its way out of its financial state.

The abrupt end of the American Lend-Lease programme in August 1945 almost caused a crisis. Some relief was provided by the Anglo-American loan, negotiated in December 1945. The conditions attached to the loan included making the pound fully convertible to the US dollar. When this was introduced in July 1947, it led to a currency crisis and convertibility had to be suspended after just five weeks. The UK benefited from the American Marshall Aid program in 1948, and the economic situation improved significantly. Another balance of payments crisis in 1949 forced Chancellor of the Exchequer, Stafford Cripps, into devaluation of the pound.

Despite these problems, one of the main achievements of Attlee's government was the maintenance of near full employment. The government maintained most of the wartime controls over the economy, including control over the allocation of materials and manpower, and unemployment rarely rose above 500,000, or 3 per cent of the total workforce. Labour shortages proved a more frequent problem. The inflation rate was also kept low during his term. The rate of unemployment rarely rose above 2 per cent during Attlee's time in office, whilst there was no hard-core of long-term unemployed. Both production and productivity rose as a result of new equipment, while the average working week was shortened.

The government was less successful in housing, which was the responsibility of Aneurin Bevan. The government had a target to build 400,000 new houses a year to replace those which had been destroyed in the war, but shortages of materials and manpower meant that less than half this number were built. Nevertheless, millions of people were rehoused as a result of the Attlee government's housing policies. Between August 1945 and December 1951, 1,016,349 new homes were completed in England, Scotland, and Wales.

When the Attlee government was voted out of office in 1951, the economy had been improved compared to 1945. The period from 1946 to 1951 saw continuous full employment and steadily rising living standards, which increased by about 10 per cent each year. During that same period, the economy grew by 3 per cent a year, and by 1951 the UK had "the best economic performance in Europe, while output per person was increasing faster than in the United States". Careful planning after 1945 also ensured that demobilisation was carried out without having a negative impact upon economic recovery, and that unemployment stayed at very low levels. In addition, the number of motor cars on the roads rose from 3 million to 5 million from 1945 to 1951, and seaside holidays were taken by far more people than ever before. A Monopolies and Restrictive Practices (Inquiry and Control) Act was passed in 1948, which allowed for investigations of restrictive practices and monopolies. However, some economic historians have argued that the UK failed to develop economically after the war, with failure to support industry leaving the economy not recovering as effectively as Germany.

==== Energy ====
1947 proved a particularly difficult year for the government; an exceptionally cold winter that year caused coal mines to freeze and cease production, creating widespread power cuts and food shortages. The Minister of Fuel and Power, Emanuel Shinwell was widely blamed for failing to ensure adequate coal stocks, and soon resigned from his post. The Conservatives capitalised on the crisis with the slogan 'Starve with Strachey and shiver with Shinwell' (referring to the Minister of Food John Strachey).

The crisis led to an unsuccessful plot by Hugh Dalton to replace Attlee as prime minister with Ernest Bevin. Later that year Stafford Cripps tried to persuade Attlee to stand aside for Bevin. These plots petered out after Bevin refused to cooperate. Later that year, Dalton resigned as Chancellor after inadvertently leaking details of the budget to a journalist. He was replaced by Cripps.

=== Foreign policy ===
In foreign affairs, the Attlee government was concerned with four main issues: post-war Europe, the onset of the Cold War, the establishment of the United Nations, and decolonisation. The first two were closely related, and Attlee was assisted by Foreign Secretary Ernest Bevin. Attlee also attended the later stages of the Potsdam Conference, where he negotiated with President Harry S. Truman and Joseph Stalin.

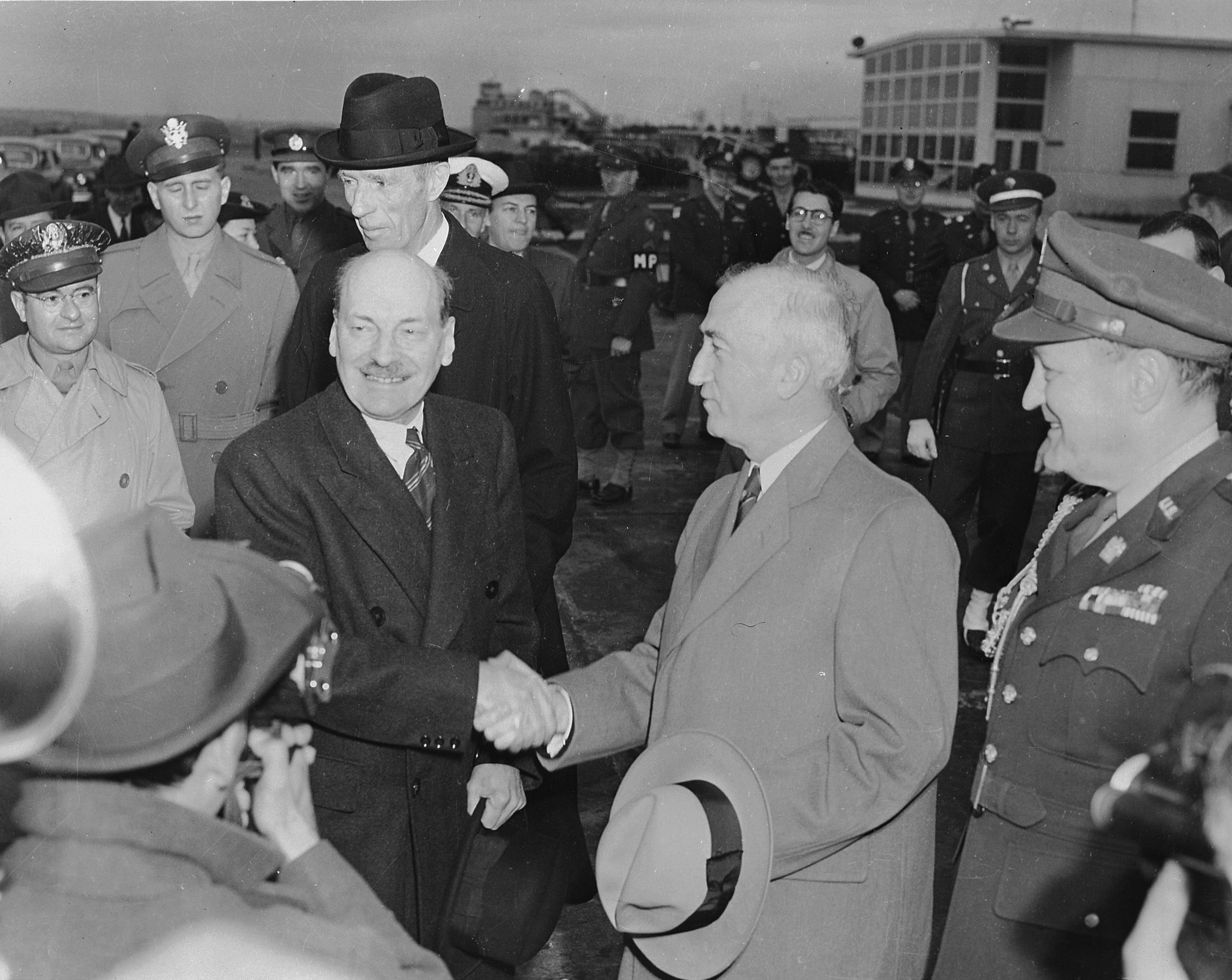
Attlee shaking hands with US secretary of state James F. Byrnes upon his arrival at National Airport in Washington, 1945

Attlee with Harry S. Truman and Joseph Stalin at the Potsdam Conference, 1945

In the immediate aftermath of the war, the Government faced the challenge of managing relations with Britain's former war-time ally, Stalin and the Soviet Union. Ernest Bevin was a passionate anti-communist, based largely on his experience of fighting communist influence in the trade union movement. Bevin's initial approach to the USSR as foreign secretary was "wary and suspicious, but not automatically hostile". Attlee himself sought warm relations with Stalin. He put his trust in the United Nations, rejected notions that the Soviet Union was bent on world conquest, and warned that treating Moscow as an enemy would turn it into one. This put Attlee at sword's point with his foreign minister, the Foreign Office, and the military who all saw the Soviets as a growing threat to Britain's role in the Middle East. Suddenly in January 1947, Attlee reversed his position and agreed with Bevin on a hardline anti-Soviet policy.

In an early "good-will" gesture that was later heavily criticised, the Attlee government allowed the Soviets to purchase, under the terms of a 1946 UK-USSR Trade agreement, a total of 25 Rolls-Royce Nene jet engines in September 1947 and March 1948. The agreement included an agreement not to use them for military purposes. The price was fixed under a commercial contract; a total of 55 jet engines were sold to the USSR in 1947. However, the Cold War intensified during this period and the Soviets, who at the time were well behind the West in jet technology, reverse-engineered the Nene and installed their own version in the MiG-15 interceptor. This was used to good effect against US-UK forces in the subsequent Korean War, as well as in several later MiG models.

After Stalin took political control of most of Eastern Europe, and began to subvert other governments in the Balkans, Attlee's and Bevin's worst fears of Soviet intentions were realised. The Attlee government then became instrumental in the creation of the successful NATO defence alliance to protect Western Europe against any Soviet expansion. In a crucial contribution to the economic stability of post-war Europe, Attlee's Cabinet was instrumental in promoting the American Marshall Plan for the economic recovery of Europe. He called it one of the "most bold, enlightened and good-natured acts in the history of nations".

A group of Labour MPs, organised under the banner of "Keep Left", urged the government to steer a middle way between the two emerging superpowers, and advocated the creation of a "third force" of European powers to stand between the US and USSR. However, deteriorating relations between Britain and the USSR, as well as Britain's economic reliance on America following the Marshall Plan, steered policy towards supporting the US. In January 1947, fear of both Soviet and American nuclear intentions led to a secret meeting of the Cabinet, where the decision was made to press ahead with the development of Britain's independent nuclear deterrent, an issue which later caused a split in the Labour Party. Britain's first successful nuclear test, however, did not occur until 1952, one year after Attlee had left office.

The London dock strike of July 1949, led by Communists, was suppressed when the Attlee government sent in 13,000 Army troops and passed special legislation to promptly end the strike. His response reveals Attlee's growing concern that Soviet expansionism, supported by the Communist Party of Great Britain, was a genuine threat to national security, and that the docks were highly vulnerable to sabotage ordered by Moscow. He noted that the strike was caused not by local grievances, but to help communist unions who were on strike in Canada. Attlee agreed with MI5 that he faced "a very present menace".

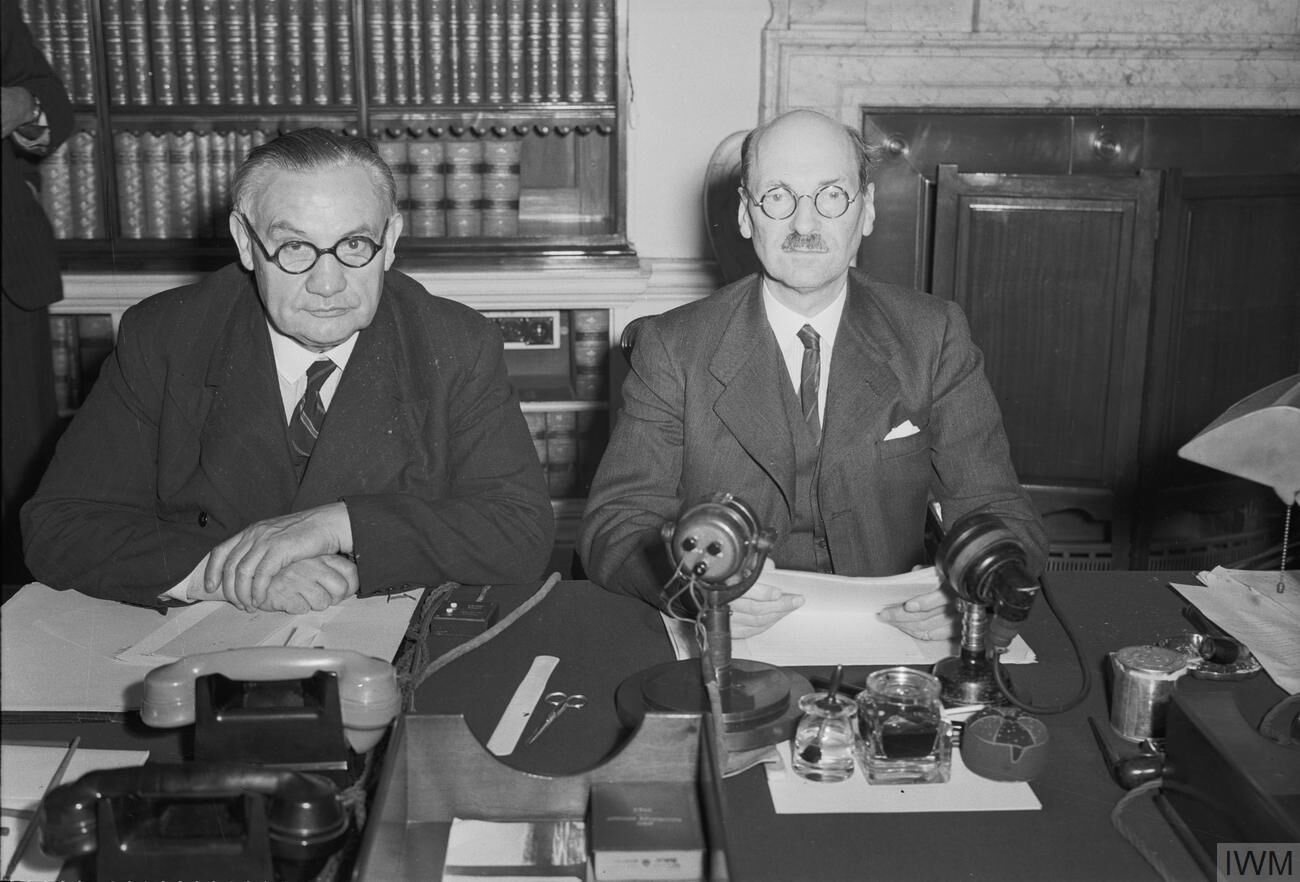
Foreign Secretary Ernest Bevin (left) with Attlee in 1945

==== Decolonisation ====
Decolonisation was never a major election issue, but Attlee gave the matter a great deal of attention and was the chief leader in beginning the process of decolonisation of the British Empire.

===== East Asia =====
In August 1948, the Chinese Communists' victories caused Attlee to begin preparing for a Communist takeover of China. It kept open consulates in Communist-controlled areas and rejected the Chinese Nationalists' requests that British citizens assist in the defence of Shanghai. By December, the government concluded that although British property in China would likely be nationalised, British traders would benefit in the long run from a stable, industrialising Communist China. Retaining Hong Kong was especially important to him; although the Chinese Communists promised to not interfere with its rule, Britain reinforced the Hong Kong Garrison during 1949. When the victorious Chinese Communists government declared on 1 October 1949 that it would exchange diplomats with any country that ended relations with the Chinese Nationalists, Britain became the first western country to formally recognise the People's Republic of China in January 1950. In 1954, a Labour Party delegation including Attlee visited China at the invitation of then Foreign Minister Zhou Enlai. Attlee became the first high-ranking western politician to meet Mao Zedong.

===== South Asia =====
Attlee orchestrated the granting of independence to India and Pakistan in 1947. Attlee in 1928–1934 had been a member of the Indian Statutory Commission (otherwise known as the Simon Commission). He became the Labour Party expert on India and by 1934 was committed to granting India the same independent dominion status that Canada, Australia, New Zealand and South Africa had recently been given. He faced strong resistance from the die-hard Conservative imperialists, led by Churchill, who opposed both independence and efforts led by Prime Minister Stanley Baldwin to set up a system of limited local control by Indians themselves. Attlee and the Labour leadership were sympathetic to both the Indian National Congress led by Jawaharlal Nehru and the Pakistan movement led by Muhammad Ali Jinnah. During the Second World War, Attlee was in charge of Indian affairs. He set up the Cripps Mission in 1942, which tried and failed to bring the factions together and unite behind the war effort. When Gandhi and Congress called for passive resistance in the Quit India movement of 1942–1945, the British government ordered the widespread arrest and internment for the duration of tens of thousands of Congress leaders as part of its efforts to crush the revolt. Labour's election Manifesto in 1945 called for "the advancement of India to responsible self-government". Attlee did not object. By contrast, the Muslim League, led by Muhammad Ali Jinnah, strongly supported the war effort. They greatly enlarged their membership and won favour from London for their decision. Attlee retained a fondness for Congress and until 1946, accepted their thesis that they were a non-religious party that accepted Hindus, Muslims, Sikhs, and everyone else. Nevertheless, this difference in opinion between the Congress and the Muslim League towards the British war effort encouraged Attlee and his government to consider further negotiations with the Muslim League.

The Muslim League insisted that it was the only true representative of all of the Muslims of India. With violence escalating in India after the war, but with British financial power at a low ebb, large-scale military involvement was impossible. Viceroy Archibald Wavell said he needed a further seven army divisions to prevent communal violence if independence negotiations failed. No divisions were available; independence was the only option. Given the increasing demands of the Muslim League, independence implied a partition that set off heavily Muslim Pakistan from the main portion of India. After becoming prime minister in 1945 Attlee originally planned to give India dominion status in 1948.

Attlee suggested in his memoirs that "traditional" colonial rule in Asia was no longer viable. He said that he expected it to meet renewed opposition after the war both by local national movements as well as by the United States. The prime minister's biographer John Bew says that Attlee hoped for a transition to a multilateral world order and a Commonwealth, and that the old British Empire "should not be supported beyond its natural lifespan" and instead be ended "on the right note." His exchequer Hugh Dalton meanwhile feared that post-war Britain could no longer afford to garrison its empire.

Ultimately the Labour government gave full independence to India and Pakistan in 1947 through the Indian Independence Act. This involved creating a demarcation between the two regions which was known as the Radcliffe Line. The boundary between the newly created states of Pakistan and India involved the widespread resettlement of millions of Hindus, Sikhs and Muslims. Almost immediately, extreme anti-Hindu and anti-Sikh violence ensued in Lahore, Multan and Dacca when the Punjab province and the Bengal province were split in the Partition of India. This was followed by a rapid increase in widespread anti-Muslim violence in several areas including Amritsar, Rajkot, Jaipur, Calcutta and Delhi. Historian Yasmin Khan estimates that over a million people were killed of which several were women and children. Gandhi himself was assassinated in January 1948. Attlee remarked Gandhi as the "greatest citizen" of India and added, "this one man has been the major factor in every consideration of the Indian problem. He had become the expression of the aspirations of the Indian people for independence".

Historian Andrew Roberts says the independence of India was a "national humiliation" but it was necessitated by urgent financial, administrative, strategic and political needs. Churchill in 1940–1945 had tightened the hold on India and imprisoned the Congress leadership, with Attlee's approval. Labour had looked forward to making it a fully independent dominion like Canada or Australia. Many of the Congress leaders in India had studied in England, and were highly regarded as fellow idealistic socialists by Labour leaders. Attlee was the Labour expert on India and took special charge of decolonisation. Attlee found that Churchill's viceroy, Field Marshal Wavell, was too imperialistic, too keen on military solutions, and too neglectful of Indian political alignments. The eventual appointee for new viceroy, Lord Mountbatten, the dashing war hero and a cousin of the King, was put forward by V. K. Krishna Menon as a candidate acceptable to all, in a series of clandestine meetings with Sir Stafford Cripps, and with Attlee.

Attlee also sponsored the peaceful transition to independence in 1948 of Burma (Myanmar) and Ceylon (Sri Lanka).

===== Palestine =====
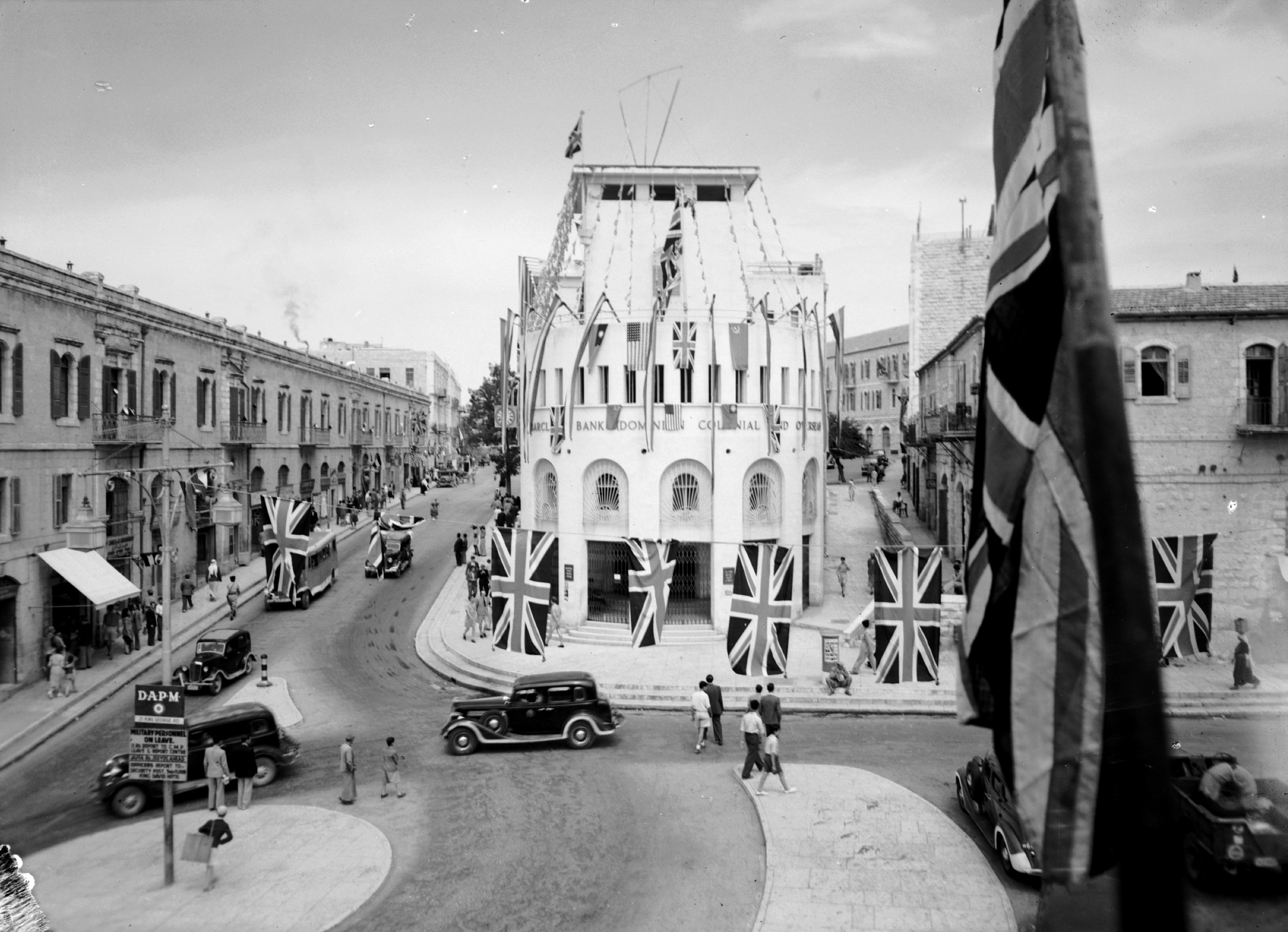
VE Day celebrations in British-controlled Jerusalem (1945)

One of the most urgent problems facing Attlee concerned the future of the British mandate in Palestine, which had become too troublesome and expensive to handle. British policies in Palestine were perceived by the Zionist movement and the Truman administration to be pro-Arab and anti-Jewish, and Britain soon found itself unable to maintain public order in the face of a Jewish insurgency and a civil war.

During this period, 70,000 Holocaust survivors attempted to reach Palestine as part of the Aliyah Bet refugee movement. Attlee's government tried several tactics to prevent the migration. Five ships were bombed by the Secret Intelligence Service (though with no casualties) with a fake Palestinian group created to take responsibility. The navy apprehended over 50,000 refugees en route, interning them in detention camps in Cyprus. Conditions in the camps were harsh and faced global criticism. Later, the refugee ship Exodus 1947 would be sent back to mainland Europe, instead of being taken to Cyprus.

In response to the increasingly unpopular mandate, Attlee ordered the evacuation of all British military personnel and handed over the issue to the United Nations, a decision which was widely supported by the general public in Britain. With the establishment of the state of Israel in 1948, the camps in Cyprus were eventually closed, with their former occupants completing their journey to the new country.

Attlee remained critical of Israel years after its establishment. In 1958, he described the Israelis as extremely aggressive against the neighbouring Arab states and the Balfour Declaration as a mistake.

===== Africa =====
The government's policies with regard to the other colonies, particularly those in Africa, focused on keeping them as strategic Cold War assets while modernising their economies. The Labour Party had long attracted aspiring leaders from Africa and had developed elaborate plans before the war. Implementing them overnight with an empty treasury proved too challenging. A major military base was built in Kenya, and the African colonies came under an unprecedented degree of direct control from London. Development schemes were implemented to help solve Britain's post-war balance of payments crisis and raise African living standards. This "new colonialism" worked slowly, and had failures such as the Tanganyika groundnut scheme.

=== Elections ===
The 1950 election gave Labour a massively reduced majority of five seats compared to the triple-digit majority of 1945. Although re-elected, the result was seen by Attlee as very disappointing, and was widely attributed to the effects of post-war austerity denting Labour's appeal to middle-class voters. With such a small majority leaving him dependent on a small number of MPs to govern, Attlee's second term was much tamer than his first. Some major reforms were nevertheless passed, particularly regarding industry in urban areas and regulations to limit air and water pollution.

By 1951, the Attlee government was exhausted, with several of its most senior ministers ailing or ageing, and with a lack of new ideas. Attlee's record for settling internal differences in the Labour Party fell in April 1951, when there was a damaging split over an austerity Budget brought in by the Chancellor, Hugh Gaitskell, to pay for the cost of Britain's participation in the Korean War. Aneurin Bevan resigned to protest against the new charges for "teeth and spectacles" in the National Health Service introduced by that Budget, and was joined in this action by several senior ministers, including the future prime minister Harold Wilson, then the president of the Board of Trade. Thus escalated a battle between the left and right wings of the Party that continues today. Finding it increasingly impossible to govern, Attlee's only chance was to call a snap election in October 1951, in the hope of achieving a more workable majority and to regain authority. The gamble failed: Labour narrowly lost to the Conservative Party, despite winning considerably more votes (achieving the largest Labour vote in electoral history). Attlee tendered his resignation to King George the following day, after six years and three months in office.

== Return to opposition ==
Following the defeat in 1951, Attlee continued to lead the party as Leader of the Opposition. His last four years as leader were, however, widely seen as one of the Labour Party's weaker periods.

The period was dominated by infighting between the Labour Party's right wing, led by Hugh Gaitskell, and its left, led by Aneurin Bevan. Many Labour MPs felt that Attlee should have retired following the 1951 election and allowed a younger man to lead the party. Bevan openly called for him to stand down in the summer of 1954. One of his main reasons for staying on as leader was to frustrate the leadership ambitions of Herbert Morrison, whom Attlee disliked for both political and personal reasons. At one time, Attlee had favoured Aneurin Bevan to succeed him as leader, but this became problematic after Bevan almost irrevocably split the party.

Attlee was nominated for the Nobel Peace Prize in 1954 for his support of the League of Nations and the United Nations, and received further nominations in 1955 and 1964, but was unsuccessful on each occasion.

Attlee, aged 72, contested the 1955 general election against Anthony Eden, which saw Labour lose 18 seats, and the Conservatives increase their majority. In an interview with the News Chronicle columnist Percy Cudlipp in mid-September 1955, Attlee made clear his own thinking together with his preference for the leadership succession, stating:

Labour has nothing to gain by dwelling in the past. Nor do I think we can impress the nation by adopting a futile left-wingism. I regard myself as Left of Centre which is where a Party Leader ought to be. It is no use asking, 'What would Keir Hardie have done?' We must have at the top men brought up in the present age, not, as I was, in the Victorian Age.

He retired as Leader of the Labour Party on 7 December 1955, having led the party for twenty years, and on 14 December Hugh Gaitskell was elected as his successor.

== Retirement ==
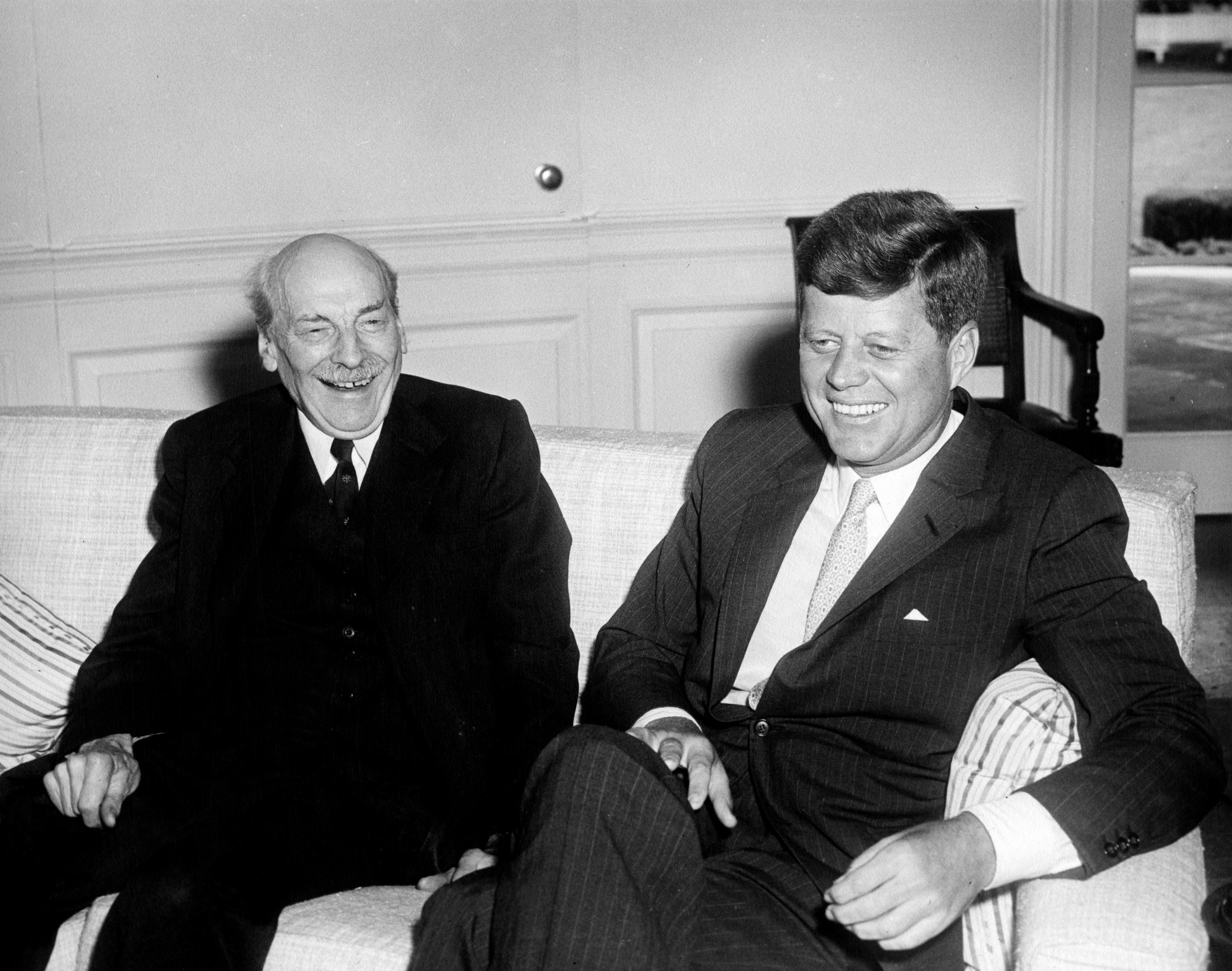
Attlee with John F. Kennedy in 1961

He subsequently retired from the House of Commons and was elevated to the peerage as Earl Attlee and Viscount Prestwood on 16 December 1955, taking his seat in the House of Lords on 25 January. He believed Eden had been forced into taking a strong stand on the Suez Crisis by his backbenchers. In 1958, Attlee, along with numerous notables, established the Homosexual Law Reform Society: this campaigned for the decriminalisation of homosexual acts in private by consenting adults, a reform that was voted through Parliament nine years later. In May 1961, he travelled to Washington, D.C., to meet with President Kennedy. That same year, he was one of the signatories of the agreement to convene a convention for drafting a world constitution; as a result, for the first time in human history, a World Constituent Assembly convened to draft and adopt a Constitution for the Federation of Earth.

In 1962, he spoke twice in the House of Lords against the British government's application for the UK to join the European Communities ("Common Market"). In his second speech delivered in November, Attlee claimed that Britain had a separate parliamentary tradition from the Continental European countries that comprised the EC. He also claimed that if Britain became a member, EC rules would prevent the British government from planning the economy and that Britain's traditional policy had been outward-looking rather than Continental.

In January 1963, Attlee was interviewed by ITN to commemorate his 80th birthday. Reflecting on his role in Indian independence, he expressed his belief that India should have remained under either a unitary government or a federation, rather than have been divided. When asked about the Polaris deal, he would simply say: "Doesn't sound too good to me.", going on to express doubts on the need for Britain to hold onto its nuclear deterrence. He would then go on to reiterate his opposition to entering the European Common Market, as he feared a "purely European alliance" would break up the global and multi-racial Commonwealth. Furthermore, he would say that he was the most impressed by President Roosevelt, and when asked on his thoughts on President Kennedy, he would say: "He's young, but he's coming along nicely."

He attended Winston Churchill's funeral in January 1965. He was frail by that time, and had to remain seated in the freezing cold as the coffin was carried, having tired himself out by standing at the rehearsal the previous day. He lived to see the Labour Party return to power under Harold Wilson in 1964, and also to see his old constituency of Walthamstow West fall to the Conservatives in a by-election in September 1967.

== Death ==
Attlee died peacefully in his sleep of pneumonia at the age of 84 at Westminster Hospital on 8 October 1967. Two thousand people attended his funeral in November, including the then-prime minister Harold Wilson and the Duke of Kent, who represented the Queen. He was cremated and his ashes were buried at Westminster Abbey.

Upon his death, the title passed to his son Martin Richard Attlee, 2nd Earl Attlee (1927–1991), who defected from Labour to the SDP in 1981. It is now held by Attlee's grandson, John Richard Attlee, 3rd Earl Attlee. The third earl, a member of the Conservative Party, retained his seat in the Lords as one of the hereditary peers permitted to remain under an amendment to Labour's House of Lords Act 1999. The seat would later be abolished following the 3rd Earl Attlee's retirement due to the passing of the House of Lords (Hereditary Peers) Act 2026.

Attlee's estate was sworn for probate at £7,295, equivalent to £116,239 in 2025, a relatively modest sum for so prominent a figure and only a fraction of the £75,394 in his father's estate when he died in 1908.

== Legacy ==
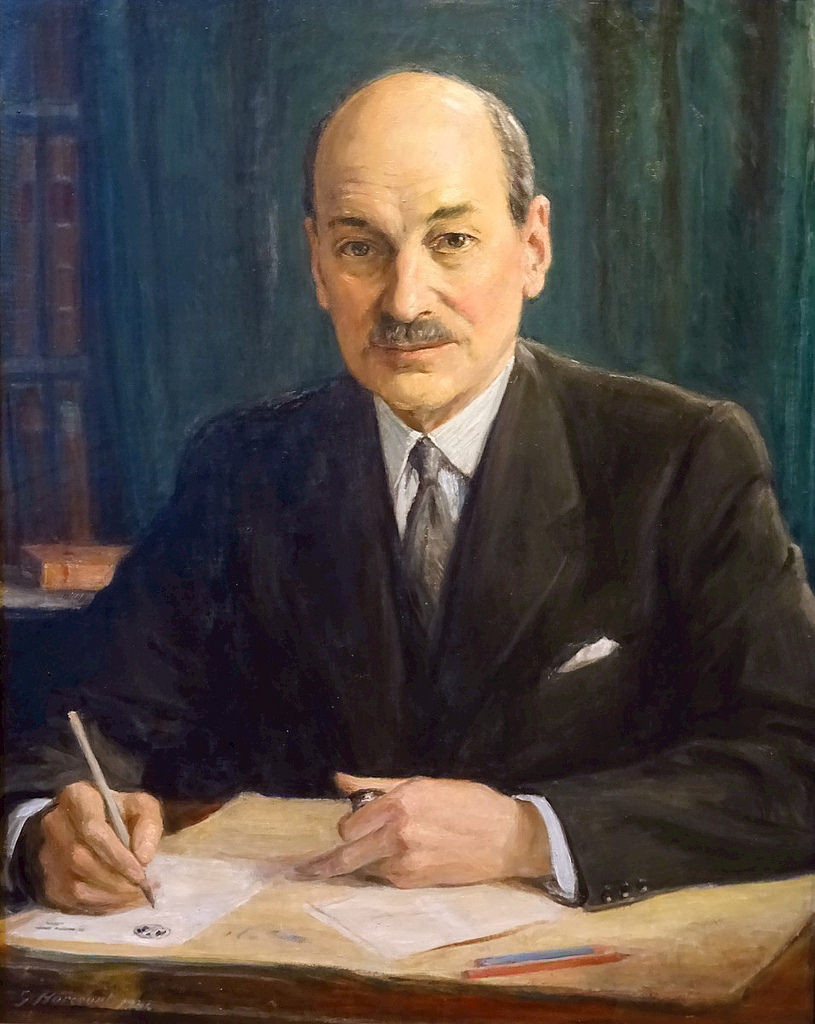
Portrait by George Harcourt, 1946

The quotation about Attlee, "A modest man, but then he has so much to be modest about", is commonly ascribed to Churchill—though Churchill denied saying it, and respected Attlee's service in the War cabinet. Attlee's modesty and quiet manner hid a great deal that has only come to light with historical reappraisal. Attlee himself is said to have responded to critics with a limerick: "There were few who thought him a starter, Many who thought themselves smarter. But he ended PM, CH and OM, an Earl and a Knight of the Garter".

His leadership style of consensual government, acting as a chairman rather than a president, won him much praise from historians and politicians alike. Christopher Soames, the British Ambassador to France during the Conservative government of Edward Heath and cabinet minister under Margaret Thatcher, remarked that "Mrs Thatcher was not really running a team. Every time you have a Prime Minister who wants to make all the decisions, it mainly leads to bad results. Attlee didn't. That's why he was so damn good". The journalist and broadcaster Anthony Howard called him "the greatest Prime Minister of the 20th century".

Thatcher herself wrote in her 1995 memoirs, which charted her life from her beginnings in Grantham to her victory at the 1979 general election, that she admired Attlee, writing: "Of Clement Attlee, however, I was an admirer. He was a serious man and a patriot. Quite contrary to the general tendency of politicians in the 1990s, he was all substance and no show".

Attlee's government presided over the successful transition from a wartime economy to peacetime, tackling problems of demobilisation, shortages of foreign currency, and adverse deficits in trade balances and government expenditure. Further domestic policies that he brought about included the creation of the National Health Service and the post-war welfare state, which became key to the reconstruction of post-war Britain. Attlee and his ministers did much to transform the UK into a more prosperous and egalitarian society during their time in office with reductions in poverty and a rise in the general economic security of the population.

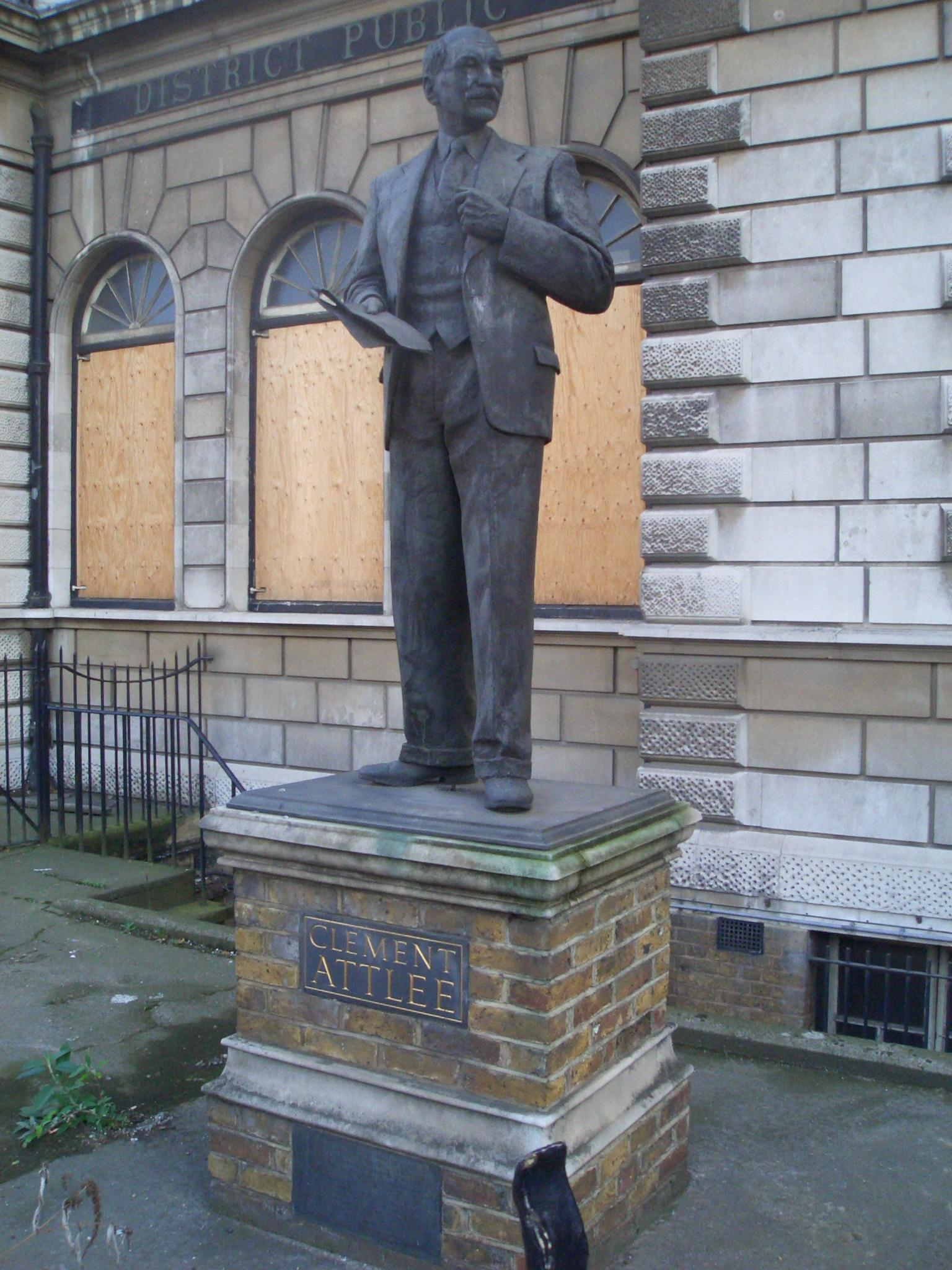
Statue of Attlee in its former position outside Limehouse Library

In foreign affairs, he did much to assist with the post-war economic recovery of Europe. He proved a loyal ally of the US at the onset of the Cold War. Due to his style of leadership, it was not he, but Ernest Bevin who masterminded foreign policy. It was Attlee's government that decided Britain should have an independent nuclear weapons programme, and work on it began in 1947.

Bevin, Attlee's foreign secretary, famously stated that "We've got to have it [nuclear weapons] and it's got to have a bloody Union Jack on it". The first operational British nuclear bomb detonated in October 1952, about one year after Attlee had left office. Independent British atomic research was prompted partly by the 1946 US McMahon Act, which nullified wartime expectations of postwar US–UK collaboration in nuclear research, and prohibited Americans from communicating nuclear technology even to allied countries who had participated in the wartime development of the atomic bomb. British atomic bomb research was kept secret even from some members of Attlee's own cabinet, whose loyalty or discretion seemed uncertain.

Although a socialist, Attlee still believed in the British Empire of his youth. He thought of it as an institution that was a power for good in the world. Nevertheless, he saw that a large part of it needed to be self-governing. Using the Dominions of Canada, Australia, and New Zealand as a model, he continued the transformation of the empire into the modern-day British Commonwealth.

His greatest achievement, surpassing many of these, was perhaps the establishment of a political and economic consensus about the governance of Britain that all three major parties subscribed to for three decades, fixing the arena of political discourse until the late-1970s. In 2004, he was voted the most successful British prime minister of the 20th century by a poll of 139 academics organised by Ipsos MORI.

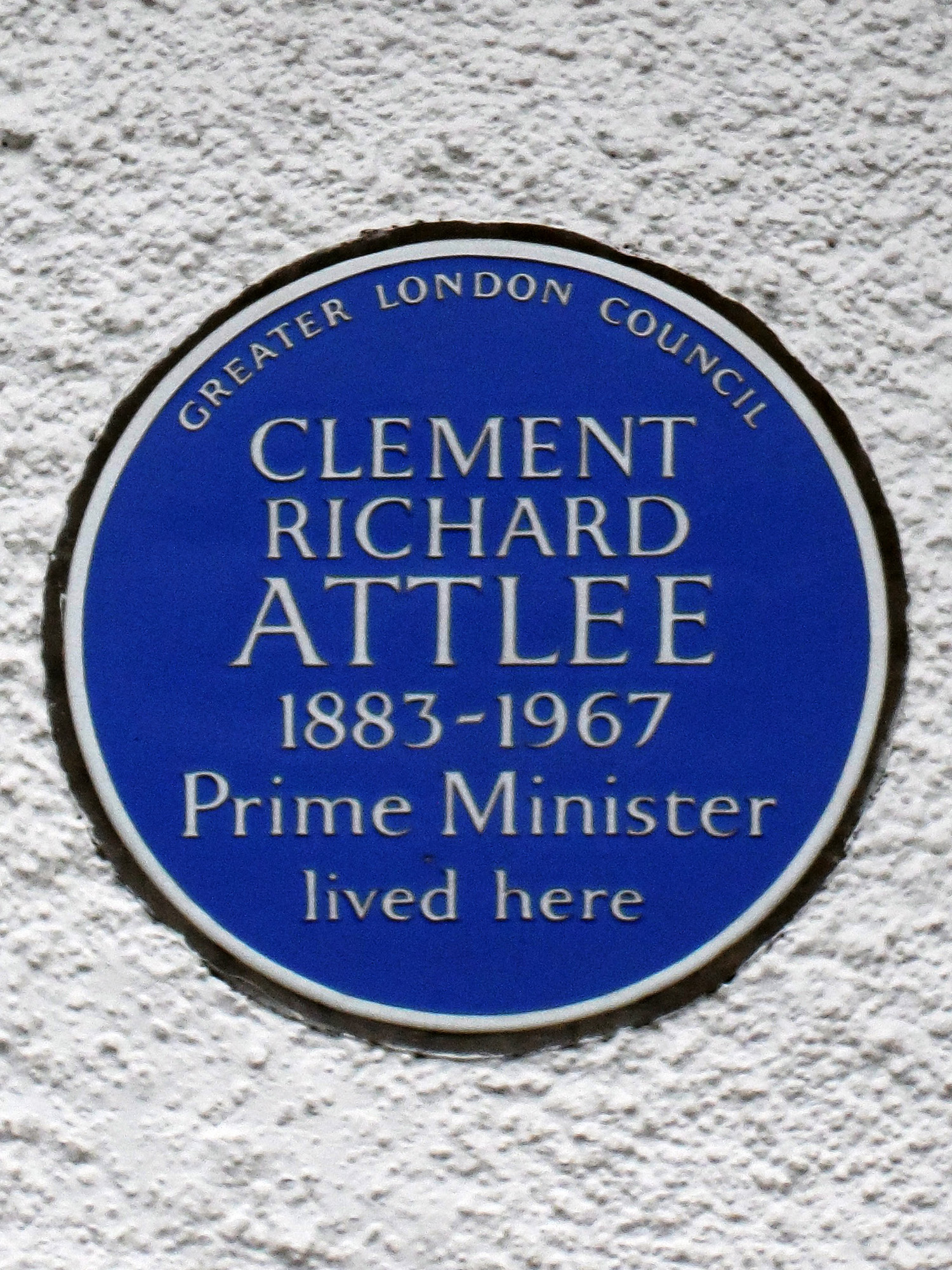
Blue plaque erected in 1984 by Greater London Council at 17 Monkhams Avenue

A blue plaque unveiled in 1979 commemorates Attlee at 17 Monkhams Avenue, in Woodford Green in the London Borough of Redbridge.

Attlee was elected a Fellow of the Royal Society in 1947. Attlee was awarded an Honorary Fellowship of Queen Mary College on 15 December 1948.

In the 1960s a new suburb near Curepipe in British Mauritius was given the name Cité Atlee [sic] in his honour.

In 2009, Wandsworth Council erected a green plaque commemorating Attlee at the site of 18 Portinscale Road, in Putney in the London Borough of Wandsworth. The site was where Attlee was born and raised, prior to the building's demolition. The plaque was unveiled by his grandson, John Attlee, 3rd Earl Attlee. In September 2025, local politicians, including Fleur Anderson, the MP for Putney, gathered around the plaque to commemorate the 80th anniversary of Attlee becoming Prime Minister.

In October 2025, the "Craft Beer Co" public house in Limehouse rebranded as "The Clement Attlee", who was MP for the area from 1935 to 1955.

=== Statues ===
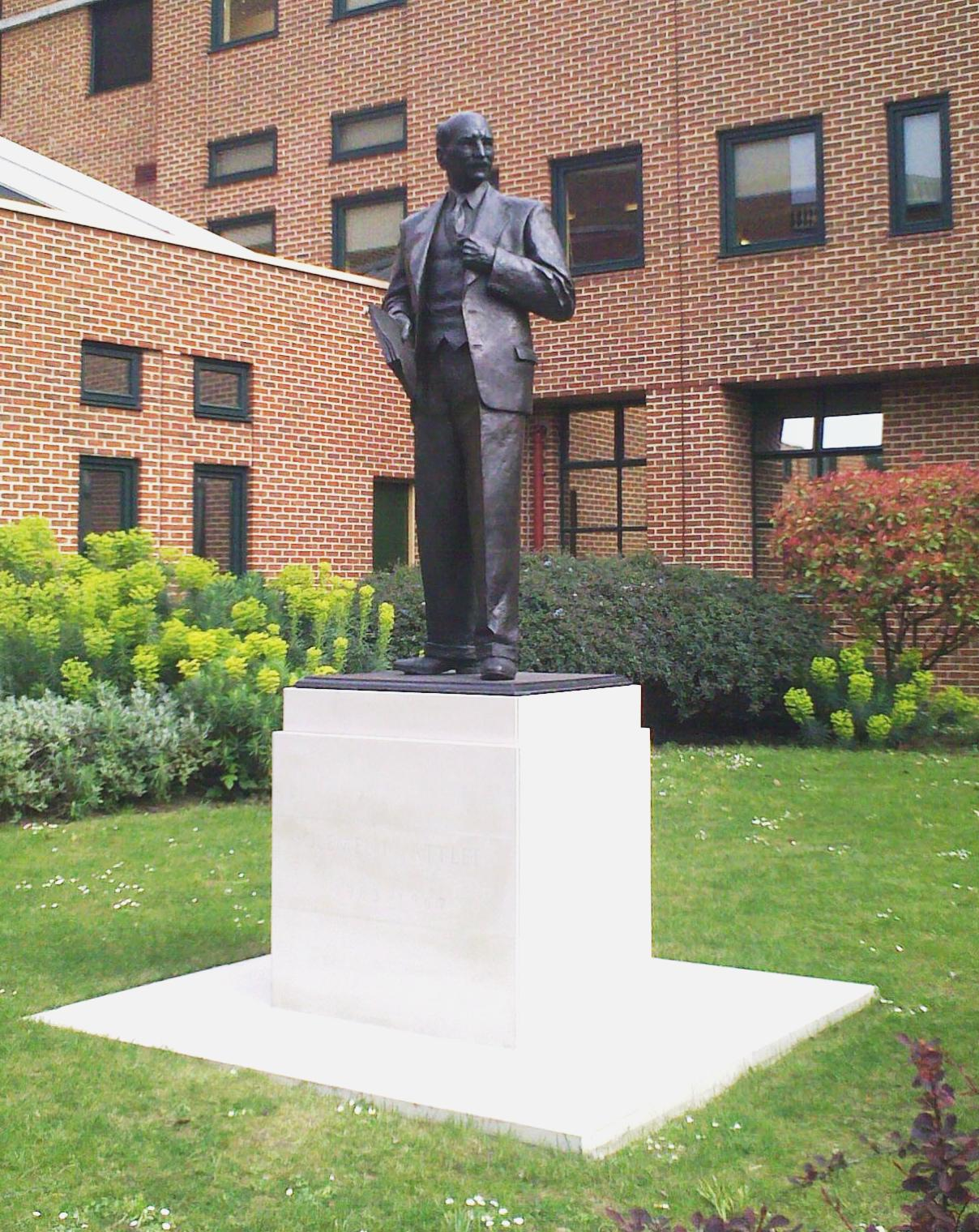
The Statue of Clement Attlee in its new position at Queen Mary University of London

On 30 November 1988, a bronze statue of Clement Attlee was unveiled by Harold Wilson (the next Labour Prime Minister after Attlee) outside Limehouse Library in Attlee's former constituency. By then Wilson was the last surviving member of Attlee's cabinet, and the unveiling of the statue would be one of the last public appearances by Wilson, who was by that point in the early stages of Alzheimer's disease; he died at the age of 79 in May 1995.

Limehouse Library was closed in 2003, after which the statue was vandalised. The council surrounded it with protective hoarding for four years, before eventually removing it for repair and recasting in 2009. The restored statue was unveiled by Peter Mandelson in April 2011, in its new position less than a mile away at the Queen Mary University of London's Mile End campus.

There is also a statue of Clement Attlee in the Houses of Parliament that was erected, instead of a bust, by parliamentary vote in 1979. The sculptor was Ivor Roberts-Jones.

== Personal life ==
Attlee met Violet Millar while on a long trip with friends to Italy in 1921. They fell in love and were soon engaged, marrying at Christ Church, Hampstead, on 10 January 1922. It was a devoted marriage, with Attlee providing protection and Violet providing a home that was an escape for Attlee from political turmoil. She died in 1964. They had four children:

- Lady Janet Helen (1923–2019), married the scientist Harold Shipton (1920–2007) at Ellesborough Parish Church in 1947.
- Lady Felicity Ann (1925–2007), married a business executive, John Keith Harwood (1926–1989), at Little Hampden in 1955
- Martin Richard, Viscount Prestwood, later 2nd Earl Attlee (1927–1991), married Anne Henderson on 16 February 1955.
- Lady Alison Elizabeth (1930–2016), married Richard Davis at Great Missenden in 1952.

=== Religious views ===
Although his parents were devout Anglicans, with one of his brothers becoming a clergyman and one of his sisters a missionary, Attlee himself is usually regarded as an agnostic. In an interview he described himself as "incapable of religious feeling", saying that he believed in "the ethics of Christianity" but not "the mumbo-jumbo". When asked whether he was an agnostic, Attlee replied "I don't know".

== Honours and arms ==
Coat of arms of Clement Attlee
Coronet A coronet of an Earl Crest On a Mount Vert two Lions addorsed Or Escutcheon Azure, on a Chevron Or between three Hearts of the Last winged Argent as many Lions rampant Sable Supporters On either side a Welsh Terrier sejant Proper Motto Labor vincit omnia (Labour conquers all) Orders The Most Noble Order of the Garter

== See also ==
- Ethical socialism
- Information Research Department
- Malayan Emergency
- History of the United Kingdom (1945–present)

== Bibliography ==
- Attlee, Clement Richard (1920). The Social Worker. London: G. Bell.
- Beckett, Francis (1998). Clem Attlee: A Biography. Blake. ISBN 978-1860661013.
- Bew, John (2016). Citizen Clem: A Biography of Attlee. Riverrun.
- Bew, John (2017). Clement Attlee: The Man Who Made Modern Britain. Oxford University Press. ISBN 9780190203405.
- Brookshire, Jerry Hardman (1995). Clement Attlee. New York: Manchester University Press. ISBN 0-7190-3244-X.
- Bullock, Alan (1983). "8". Ernest Bevin: Foreign Secretary.
- Harris, Kenneth (1982). Attlee. London: Weidenfeld and Nicolson. ISBN 978-0-297-77993-3.
- Howell, David (2006). Beckett, Francis (ed.). Attlee. 20 British Prime Ministers of the 20th Century. Haus Publishing. ISBN 1904950647.
- Jefferys, Kevin (14 January 2014). The Attlee Governments 1945–1951. Routledge. ISBN 978-1-317-89894-8.
- Marr, Andrew (2007). A History of Modern Britain (2009 ed.). Pan Books.
- Pearce, Robert (1997). Attlee. Longman. ISBN 0582256909.
- Beech, Matt; Lee, Simon (2008). Ten Years of New Labour. Palgrave Macmillan. ISBN 978-0230574434.
- Hill, C. P. (1970). British Economic and Social History, 1700–1964 (3rd rev. ed.). Hodder & Stoughton Educational. ISBN 978-0713116243.
- Kay, Kingsley (1946). "Development of industrial hygiene in Canada" (PDF). Industrial Safety Survey. XXII (1). Montreal: 1–11. PMID 20279825. Archived from the original (PDF) on 25 October 2016.
- Lowe, Norman (1997). Mastering Modern World History. Palgrave Master Series (3rd rev. ed.). Palgrave Macmillan. ISBN 978-0333685235.
- Morgan, Kenneth O. (1984). Labour in Power, 1945–51. OUP. ISBN 978-0192158659.
- Munro, Donald, ed. (1948). Socialism: The British Way. Essential Books.
- Pearce, Robert. (1967) Attlee Longman.
- Reeves, Rachel; McIvor, Martin (2014). "Clement Attlee and the foundations of the British welfare state". Renewal: A Journal of Labour Politics. 22 (3/4).
- Talus (1945). Your Alternative Government. London: Eyre and Spottiswoode.
- Thomas-Symonds, Nicklaus (2012). Attlee: A Life in Politics. I.B.Tauris. ISBN 978-1780762159.
- Vickers, Rhiannon (2013). The Labour Party and the World. Vol. 1: The Evolution of Labour's Foreign Policy, 1900–51. Manchester University Press. ISBN 9781847791313.
- Williams, Susan (2003). The People's King: The True Story of the Abdication. London: Penguin Books. ISBN 0-7139-9573-4.

Parliament of the United Kingdom
Preceded by William Pearce	Member of Parliament for Limehouse; 1922–1950	Constituency abolished
Preceded by Valentine McEntee	Member of Parliament for Walthamstow West; 1950–1955	Succeeded by Edward Redhead
Political offices
Preceded by Oswald Mosley	Chancellor of the Duchy of Lancaster; 1930–1931	Succeeded by The Lord Ponsonby of Shulbrede
Preceded by George Lansbury	Leader of the Opposition; 1935–1940	Succeeded by Hastings Lees-Smith
Preceded by Kingsley Wood	Lord Privy Seal; 1940–1942	Succeeded by Stafford Cripps
Preceded by The Viscount Cranborne	Secretary of State for Dominion Affairs; 1942–1943	Succeeded by The Viscount Cranborne
New office	Deputy Prime Minister of the United Kingdom (de facto); 1942–1945	Succeeded by Herbert Morrison
Preceded by John Anderson	Lord President of the Council; 1943–1945	Succeeded by The Lord Woolton
Preceded by Winston Churchill	Prime Minister of the United Kingdom; 1945–1951	Succeeded by Winston Churchill
Preceded by Winston Churchill	First Lord of the Treasury; 1945–1951	Succeeded by Winston Churchill
Preceded by Winston Churchill	Leader of the Opposition; 1951–1955	Succeeded by Herbert Morrison
Preceded by Winston Churchill	Minister of Defence; 1945–1946	Succeeded by A. V. Alexander
Party political offices
New office	Chairman of the New Fabian Research Bureau; 1931–1934	Succeeded by The Viscount Addison
Preceded by J. R. Clynes	Deputy Leader of the Labour Party; 1932–1935	Succeeded by Arthur Greenwood
Preceded by George Lansbury	Leader of the Labour Party; 1935–1955	Succeeded by Hugh Gaitskell
Civic offices
Preceded by F. J. Miles	Mayor of Stepney; 1919–1920	Succeeded by Thomas Joseph Cahill
Peerage of the United Kingdom
New creation	Earl Attlee; Viscount Prestwood; 1955–1967	Succeeded by Martin Attlee
