= Violet Attlee =

Wife of Clement Attlee

The Right Honourable The Countess Attlee
- Lady Attlee in 1946
- Born: Violet Helen Millar; 20 November 1895; London, England
- Died: 7 June 1964 (aged 68); Amersham, Buckinghamshire, England
- Education: Saint Felix School
- Known for: Spouse of the prime minister of the United Kingdom (1945–1951)
- Political party: Labour
- Spouse: Clement Attlee (m. 1922)
- Children: 4, including Martin

Violet Helen Attlee, Countess Attlee (née Millar; 20 November 1895 – 7 June 1964) was the wife of British politician and Prime Minister Clement Attlee. She was spouse of the prime minister of the United Kingdom from 1945 until 1951.

== Early life and education ==
Violet Helen Millar was born in Hampstead as the tenth child and youngest daughter of Henry Edward Millar, a prosperous businessman. She had a twin sister, Olive Christine. Her early education took place in Hampstead before she went to Saint Felix School, a boarding school in Southwold, and she worked as a VAD throughout the First World War. In the summer of 1921, she went with her mother to Italy; joining them on the trip were her brother Cedric and a former Oxford friend, Clement Attlee.

Within a few weeks of their return, Violet and Clement became engaged and were married at Christ Church, Hampstead on 10 January 1922. Theirs would be a devoted marriage. Their four children were:

- Lady Janet Helen (1923–2019)
- Lady Felicity Ann (1925–2007)
- Martin Richard (1927–1991)
- Lady Alison Elizabeth (1930–2016)

Violet joined the Labour Party shortly after her marriage to Clement.

== Later life ==
A kind, unassuming woman who was not, by her own admission, "a political wife", Violet Attlee assisted in personal matters, for instance arranging annual Boxing Day parties at Chequers for the children of her husband's ministerial colleagues. She was constantly at Clement's side at party conferences, at innumerable gatherings overseas, and in the detailed chores of his political career. She acted as his regular driver during postwar elections.

In August 1950, she joined London's Civil Defence Corps. Since 1915, she had had considerable experience with the British Red Cross Society, having led a detachment for a number of years. Frequently in poor health, Violet Attlee took ill suddenly, and was admitted to Amersham Hospital on 7 June 1964. Seven hours later, she died of a cerebral haemorrhage. With her were her husband, son, second daughter, and the latter's husband. Having been married to her for 42 years, Clement Attlee outlived his wife by three years.

== Shorthand titles ==
- Miss Violet Millar (20 November 1895 – 10 January 1922)
- Mrs Clement Attlee (10 January 1922 – 16 December 1955)
- The Rt Hon The Countess Attlee (16 December 1955 – 7 June 1964)

Unofficial roles
Preceded by Clementine Churchill	Spouse of the Prime Minister of the United Kingdom; 1945–1951	Succeeded by Dame Clementine Churchill
