= John Attlee, 3rd Earl Attlee =

British peer and hereditary member of the House of Lords (born 1956)

Major The Right Honourable The Earl Attlee TD
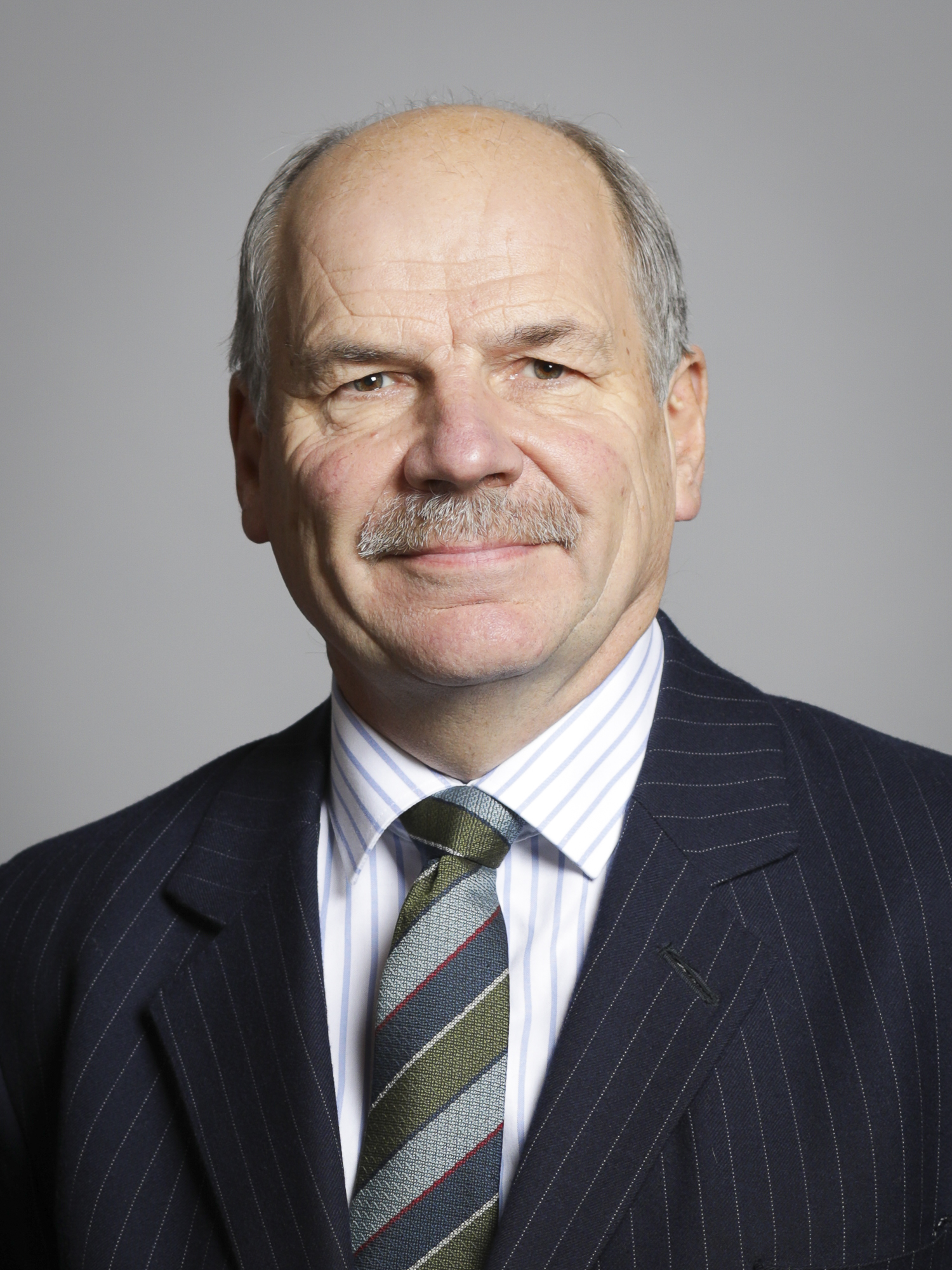

Lord-in-Waiting Government Whip
- In office 11 May 2010 – 8 April 2014
- Prime Minister: David Cameron
- Preceded by: The Lord Tunnicliffe
- Succeeded by: The Baroness Williams of Trafford

Member of the House of Lords
- Lord Temporal
- Hereditary peerage 2 March 1992 – 11 November 1999
- Preceded by: The 2nd Earl Attlee
- Succeeded by: Seat abolished
- Elected Hereditary Peer; 11 November 1999 – 26 February 2026
- Election: 1999
- Preceded by: Seat established
- Succeeded by: Seat abolished

Personal details
- Born: John Richard Attlee; 3 October 1956 (age 70)
- Party: Conservative (from 1997)
- Other political affiliations: Crossbench (until 1997)
- Spouses: Celia Plummer (m. 1993–2002) Teresa Ahern (m. 2008)

Military service
- Allegiance: United Kingdom
- Branch/service: British Army Reserve
- Years of service: 1974–2017
- Rank: Major
- Unit: Royal Corps of Transport; Royal Electrical and Mechanical Engineers

John Richard Attlee, 3rd Earl Attlee (born 3 October 1956), styled Viscount Prestwood between 1967 and 1991, is a British Conservative Party peer and former member of the House of Lords. He is the grandson of Clement Attlee, the Labour prime minister, who was the first Earl Attlee.

== Early life ==
Attlee was educated at Stowe School, trained with Smiths Industries, and worked mainly in materials management.

== Professional career ==
In 1985, Attlee went into business in the field of commercial vehicle recovery and repair. In this connection he is president of the Heavy Transport Association and Patron of the Road Rescue Recovery Association.

He undertook a tour with the non-governmental organisation British Direct Aid in Bosnia during the winter of 1993–94, and then ran British Direct Aid's operation in Rwanda for most of 1995.

== Military service ==
A member of the Territorial Army, Attlee served in Bosnia with an aid agency during 1993–1994. He has also served in the Gulf War.

== Political career ==
Attlee inherited his title following his father's death in 1991 and entered the House of Lords in 1992, initially as a crossbencher. Shortly before the general election of 1997, he joined the Conservative Party. He was one of the ninety elected hereditary peers that remained in the House of Lords after the passing of the House of Lords Act 1999.

He served as an Opposition spokesman on various subjects; immediately prior to the 2010 general election he was a spokesman for transport and an Opposition whip. Following the Conservative victory in that election, Attlee was appointed a Lord-in-waiting or Government whip in the House of Lords. He continued in that role until April 2014, when he left the government. He was replaced by Susan Williams, Baroness Williams of Trafford.

He retired from the House of Lords on 26 February 2026.

== Personal life ==
Attlee married Celia Plummer in 1993, a union that ended in divorce. He married Teresa Ahern on 27 September 2008, in the Crypt Chapel of St Mary Undercroft, Palace of Westminster. Lady Attlee is the younger daughter of Mortimer Ahern, of Malvern, Worcestershire. Should Lord Attlee die without a son, the earldom will become extinct.

== Arms ==
Coat of arms of Earls Attlee
Crest On a mount vert two lions rampant addorsed or. Escutcheon Azure, on a chevron, or, between three hearts of the last winged argent, as many lions rampant sable. Supporters On either side a Welsh terrier sejant proper. Motto Labor vincit omnia (Labour conquers all).

Peerage of the United Kingdom
Preceded by Martin Attlee	Earl Attlee; 1991–present Member of the House of Lords (1992–1999)	Incumbent; Heir: none
Parliament of the United Kingdom
New office created by the House of Lords Act 1999	Elected hereditary peer to the House of Lords under the House of Lords Act 1999; 1999–2026	Vacant
