= Christ Church, Hampstead =

Church in London, England

Coordinates: 51°33′34″N 0°10′32″W

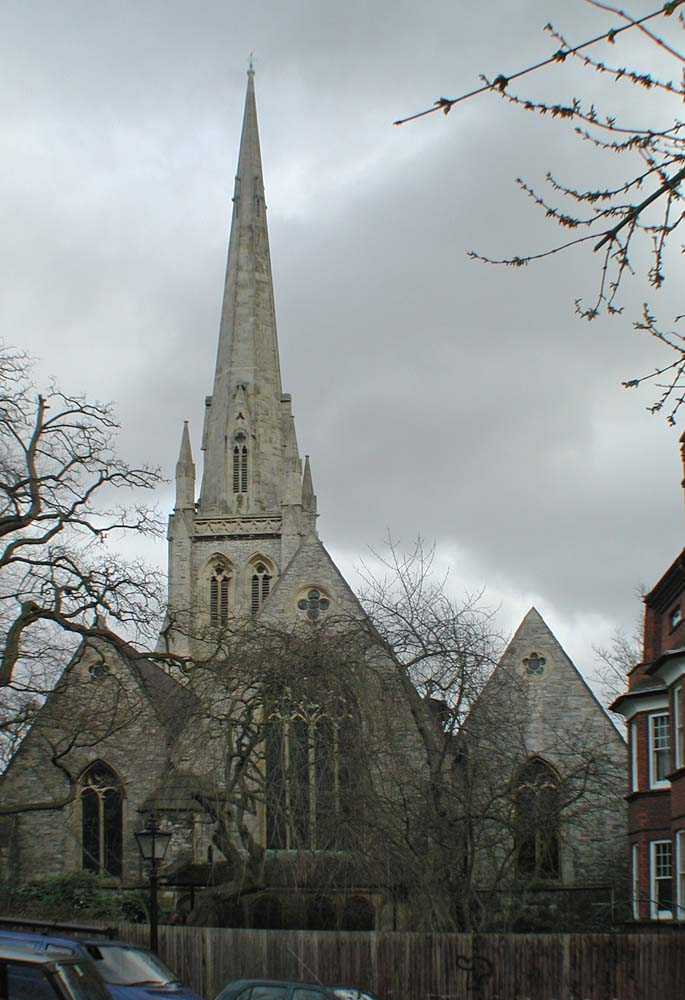

- Location within Greater London
- Country: England
- Denomination: Church of England

Architecture
- Designated: 1850
- Architect: Samuel Daukes
- Style: Early English Gothic
- Completed: 1852

Administration
- Diocese: Diocese of London
- Archdeaconry: Hampstead
- Deanery: North Camden

Clergy
- Vicar: Paul Conrad

Christ Church, Hampstead, is a Church of England church in Hampstead, London. It is a church with particular connections to the old village of Hampstead and the Heath.

Former Prime Minister Clement Attlee was married to his wife, Violet Attlee, at Christ Church, Hampstead.

== History ==
The present church was erected between 1850 and 1852 to designs by the architect Samuel Daukes in the Early English Gothic style. In 1860 a timber gallery was erected by Sir Gilbert Scott (this was dismantled in the 1960s). In 1881–82 the north porch and aisle were added to designs by Ewan Christian. The church is constructed of Kentish ragstone with Portland stone dressings and slate roofs.

In 1855 the church built a primary school adjacent, originally for infants. By the post-World War II period the school catered to kindergarten (ages 3–5) and primary (ages 5–11) mixed gender students, organized as one class per year. This was one of many such church-associated schools in the area.

== Vicars ==
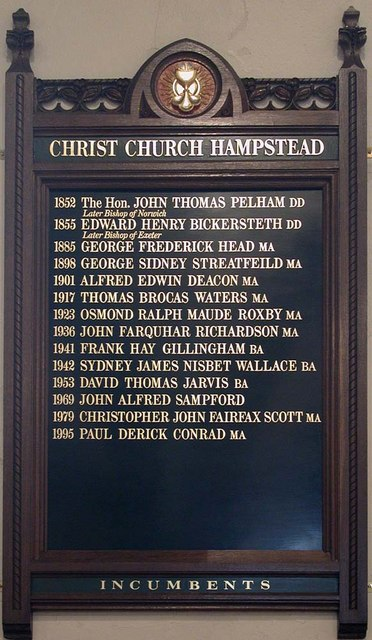
List of vicars

- John Pelham 1852–1855
- Edward Bickersteth 1855–1885
- George Frederick Head 1885–1897
- George Sidney Streatfeild 1898–1901
- Alfred Edwin Deacon 1901–1917
- Thomas Brocas Waters 1917–1922
- Osmond Ralph Maude Roxby 1923–1936
- John Farquhar Richardson 1936–1941
- Frank Hay Gillingham 1941–1942
- Sydney James Nisbet Wallace 1942–1953
- David Thomas Jarvis 1953–1969
- John Alfred Sampford 1969–1979
- Christopher John Fairfax Scott 1979–1995
- Paul Derick Conrad 1995–2024
- Yaroslav Sky Walker 2024–present

== Bells ==
The church has a ring of eight bells, the heaviest of which weighs in at 24cwt. They were installed in 2005 after Michael Royalton-Kisch, the current tower captain, single-handedly raised £100,000 to replace the old, unsafe bells. The current band practices on a Wednesday evening at 7pm, and rings for most Sunday services.

The treble, tenor, third and fifth bells were the work of Gillett & Johnston, adopted from St Luke's in Cowley, Oxford. The remaining four bells were cast by Whitechapel Bell Foundry in 2005.

Bell	Weight	Note	Cast	Founder
Treble	6-0-1	Eb	1938	Gillett & Johnston
2	6-3-2	D	2005	Whitechapel Bell Foundry
3	7-0-26	C	1938	Gillett & Johnston
4	8-0-4	Bb	2005	Whitechapel Bell Foundry
5	10-2-12	Ab	1938	Gillett & Johnston
6	12-1-26	G	2005	Whitechapel Bell Foundry
7	17-0-8	F	2005	Whitechapel Bell Foundry
Tenor	24-0-5	Eb	1938	Gillett & Johnston

== Organ ==
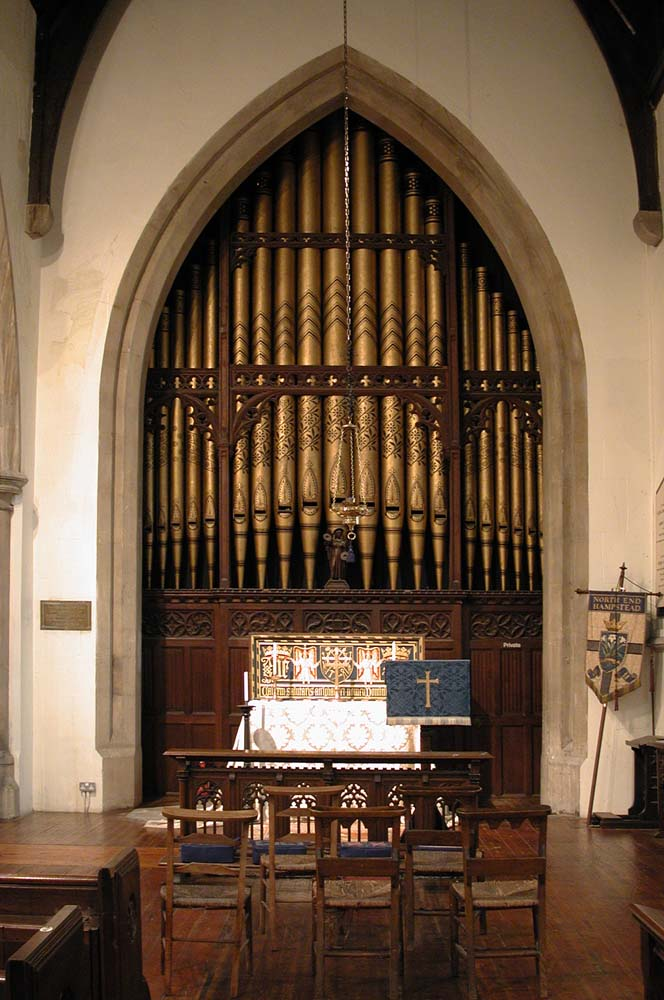
The organ pipes

The church had an organ installed in 1857 by the celebrated builder Henry Willis who also became the church's first organist. The organ has since been replaced. In about 1968 dry rot was found directly above the organ and to repair the damage the organ had to be partly dismantled. It was stored in the church but was never re-assembled. At some point after this it was taken away and stored (possibly by the organ builders Mander). After some trials of the Allen computer organ, a smaller 2 manual tracker action instrument was installed at the rear of the church. The BBC visited the church and chose to broadcast their Morning Service soon after, however the Willis organ that they heard on their 'scouting' visit had been dismantled by the time they came to broadcast live.

There have been a number of famous organists including:

- Walter Brooks
- Henry Willis 1852–1859
- Henry Parratt 1859 – ???? (formerly organist of St. Paul's Church, Huddersfield)
- John Charles Ward 1863–1868
- Dr. Marshall of Kidderminster 1868
- Charles John Vincent 1883–1891 (formerly organist of St Eustachius' Church, Tavistock)
- Henry Walford Davies 1891–1898
- Cyril Rootham 1898–1901
- Ian Graham ?–1964
- Gordon Whittard c 1964–1974?
