= Adam Balen =

British consultant in reproductive medicine

Adam Balen is a British consultant in reproductive medicine, researcher, and author. He is known for his contributions to the study and treatment of Polyendocrine metabolic ovarian syndrome (PMOS) and infertility. Balen is the Lead Clinician at Leeds Fertility, part of the Leeds Teaching Hospitals NHS Trust.

== Early life and education ==
Balen qualified in medicine from Medical College of St Bartholomew's Hospital, University of London, in 1983. He obtained a Doctor of Medicine (MD) in 1995 from the University of London and a Doctor of Science (DSc) in 2010 from the University of Leeds.

== Career ==
In 1996, Balen was appointed as a consultant at Leeds Teaching Hospitals with subspecialty accreditation in reproductive medicine. He has contributed to the development of Leeds Fertility into one of the UK's largest assisted conception units.

== Contributions ==
Balen has conducted extensive research on the causes and management of PMOS. He co-authored the widely cited paper, Ultrasound assessment of the polycystic ovary: international consensus definitions, which helped establish diagnostic criteria for the condition.

== Leadership roles ==
Balen has held several leadership positions in reproductive medicine:

- Chair of the British Fertility Society (2015–2018)
- Chair of the NHS England IVF Pricing Development Expert Advisory Group
- Chair of the WHO Expert Working Group on Infertility

== Publications and media appearances ==
Balen has authored 16 books and over 280 peer-reviewed papers. Notable works include:

- Infertility in Practice (4th edition, 2014)
- The Fertility Book: Your Definitive Guide to Achieving a Healthy Pregnancy (2021, co-authored with Grace Dugdale)

== Personal life ==
Balen is married to Grace Dugdale, with whom he co-authored The Fertility Book.
