= Michael Harmer =

Michael Harmer CBE is the former deputy chief medical officer for Wales, former chair of the Welsh Health Specialised Services Committee, and incumbent chair of the National Clinical Forum for NHS Wales.

== Education ==
Harmer was educated at St Bartholomew's Hospital Medical College, London.

== Career ==
Harmer became an anaesthetist at the University Hospital of Wales in 1982. He became head of the department of anaesthetics at the University of Wales College of Medicine

In 2005, Harmer listed his other appointments as a regional assessor into the Confidential Enquiry into Maternal Deaths, and vice-chairman, pain subcommittee, World Federation of Societies of Anaesthesiology.

Harmer became in 2007 one of two deputy chief medical officers in the Welsh Department of Health, in post until 2008, then transferring to become medical director of NHS Wales, resigning shortly afterward.

Harmer was appointed a CBE in 2013 for "services to healthcare".

=== Government scandal ===
Harmer was accused by the Conservative Party in Wales of "behaving inappropriately" in 2012, following a leak of a heavily modified report at the centre of a National Health Service reconfiguration scandal in Wales, that attracted BBC News coverage. Harmer was called to give evidence to the National Assembly for Wales' Health Committee, to which he admitted he had modified an independent report meant to be from clinical experts including doctors, paramedics, children's health professionals, dentists and therapists.

The changes influenced part of substantial changes to NHS services to local communities, leading to street protests.

Harmer rewrote substantial parts of the report, then re-submitted to the NHS, following emails exchanged with an NHS Chief Executive, Mary Burrows, Harmer deciding to use a private email account. The emails were never made public.

== Personal life ==
In 2002, Harmer listed his personal interests as home and ground maintenance.
