= Limehouse Library =

Former library in Limehouse, London, England

Coordinates: 51°30′44.13″N 0°2′00.74″W

Limehouse Public Library
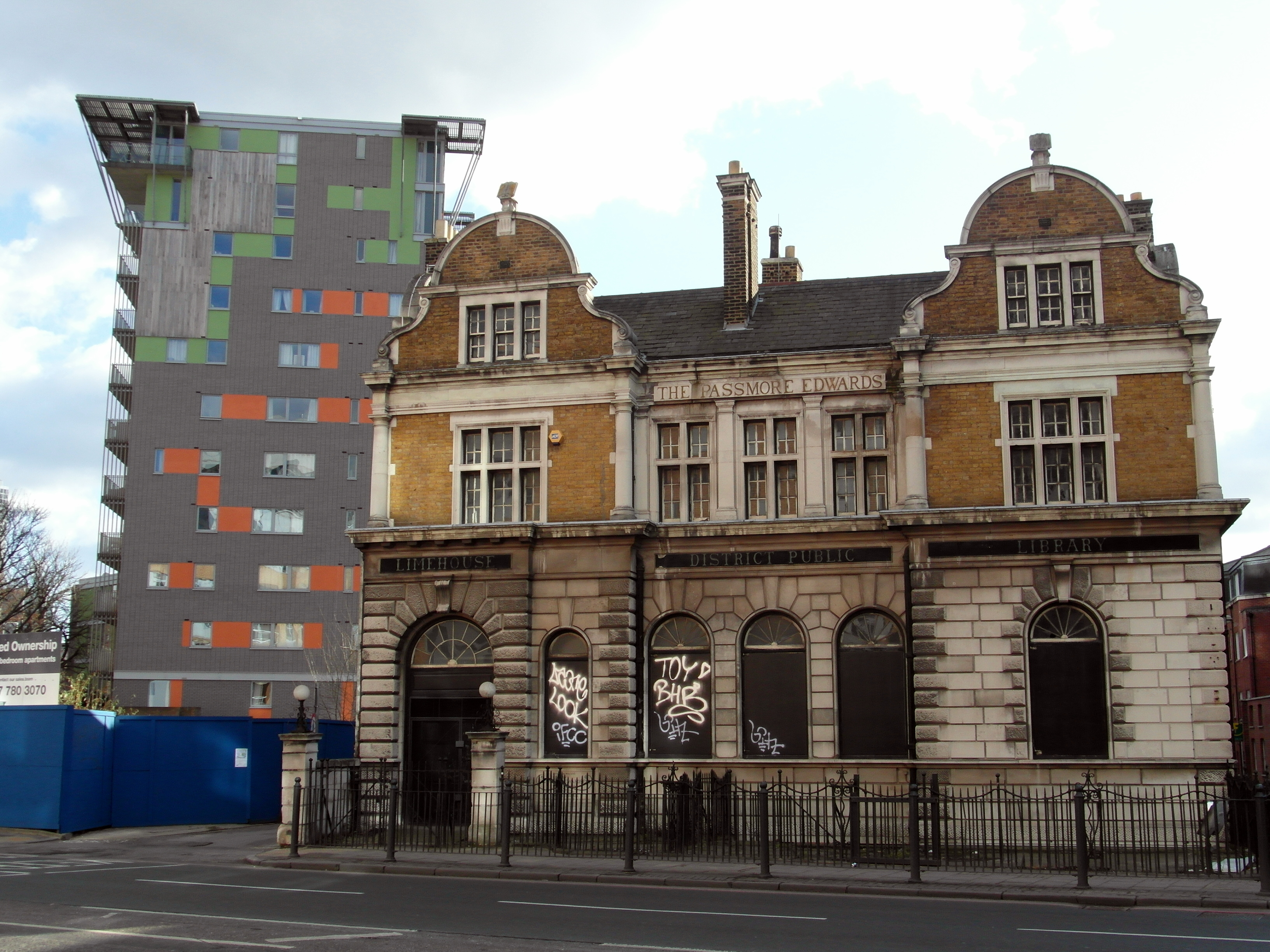
- Location: Limehouse, London, United Kingdom
- Established: October 19, 1900
- Dissolved: 2003

Limehouse Public Library is a historical building in Limehouse, London, formerly a public library. The library was first proposed for construction in 1888, but the required finances could not be raised until 1900 when John Passmore Edwards was approached for assistance. He subscribed a sum of £5,000 and he subsequently laid the foundation stone on 19 October that year. The library was opened to the public in November 1901 by the mayor of Stepney.

More recently usage of the Grade II listed building fell, and it eventually closed in 2003. It is currently boarded up to prevent vandalism. The local Tower Hamlets council put the building up for sale in a controversial transaction which has since been investigated during an enquiry into the behaviour of the borough's former mayor, Lutfur Rahman. The library building was sold to a restaurant company and was renovated into Hotel housing.. It is now the site of the Limehouse Library Hotel.

== Statue of Clement Attlee ==
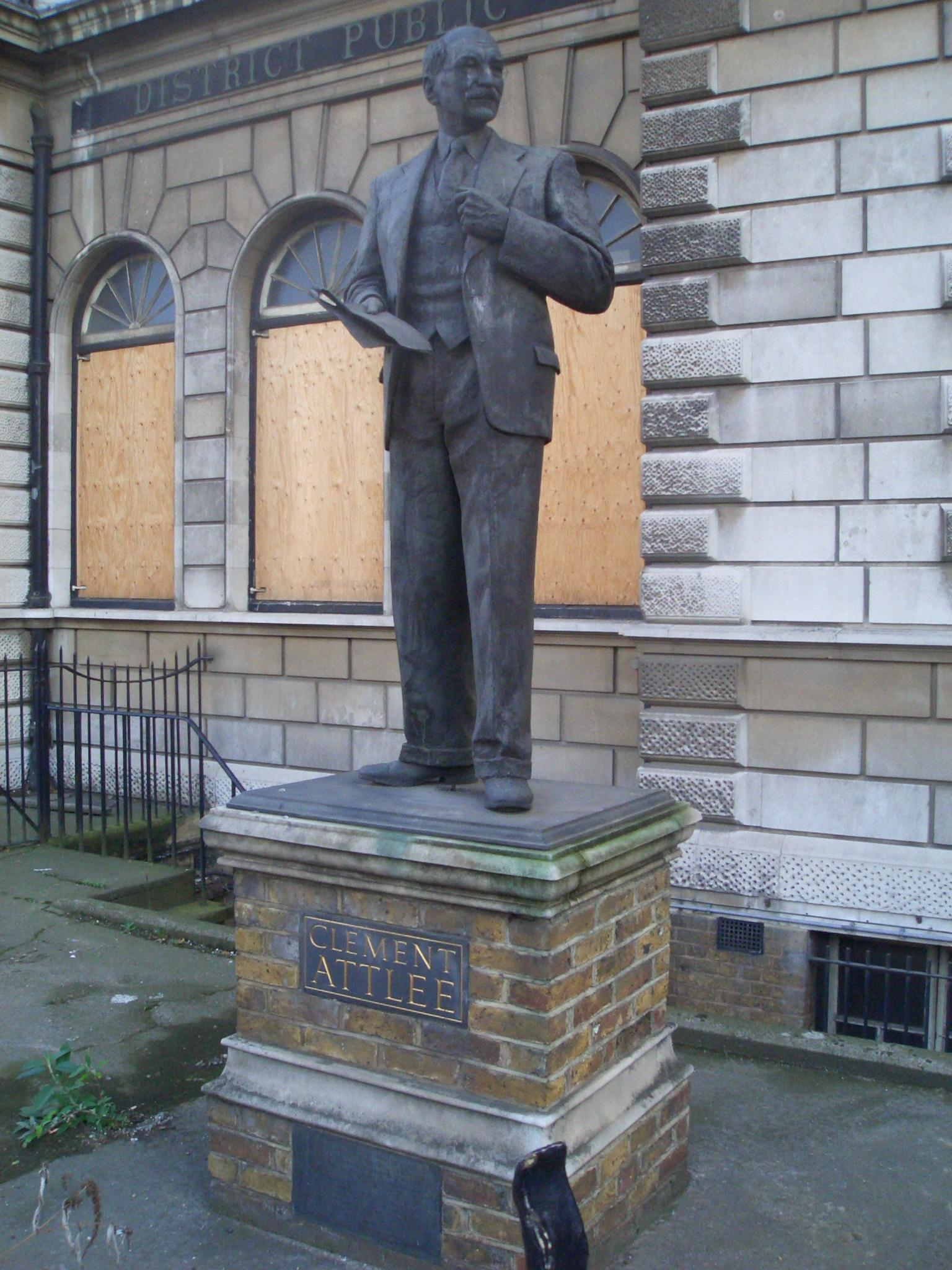
A statue of Clement Attlee in its former position in front of the boarded-up Limehouse Library

Outside the library there formerly stood a statue of Clement Attlee, erected in 1988, who was the Labour Member of Parliament (MP) for Limehouse from 1922 to 1950, and Prime Minister of the United Kingdom from 1945 to 1951. After the library closed, the statue was vandalised, and the council surrounded it with protective hoarding, before removing it for repair and recasting. In April 2011, the statue was unveiled in its new position less than a mile away at Queen Mary University of London, in Mile End.
