= Statue of Clement Attlee =

Statue in Mile End, London

Coordinates: 51.5231°N 0.0411°W

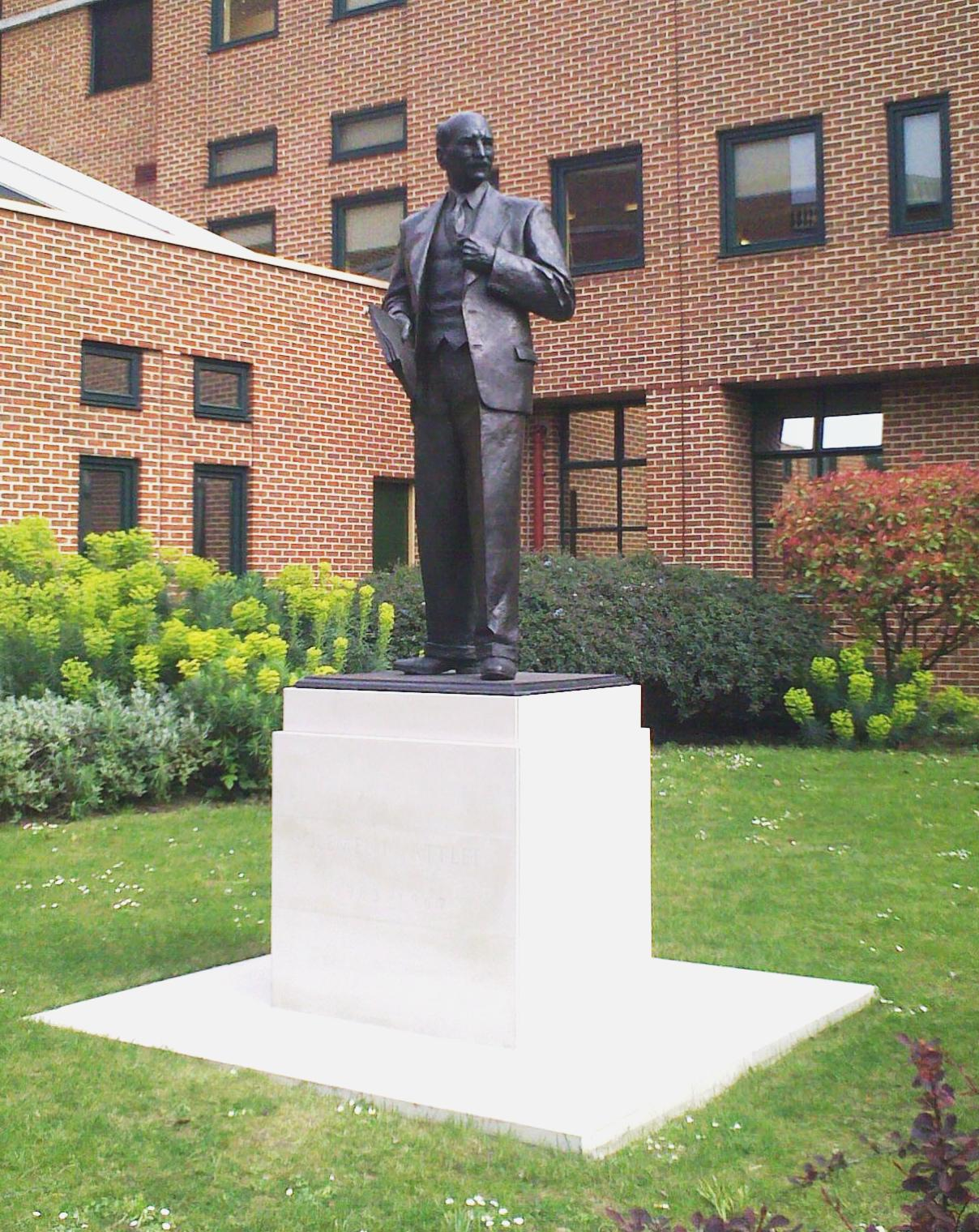
- “a touchingly prosaic portrait in bronze”
- Artist: Frank Forster
- Completion date: 1988
- Type: Statue
- Medium: Bronze
- Subject: Clement Attlee
- Dimensions: 2.1 m (6.8 ft)
- Location: Mile End; London; England; United Kingdom

The statue of Clement Attlee on the Mile End campus of Queen Mary University of London is a bronze sculpture of the British Prime Minister, created by Frank Forster in 1988. The statue was commissioned by the Greater London Council and was intended to stand in Mile End Park. By the time of its completion in 1988, the GLC had been abolished and the statue was offered to any successor authority willing to pay the relocation costs. These were met by Tower Hamlets London Borough Council and the statue was erected outside the Limehouse Public Library to commemorate Attlee's role as the member for the Limehouse parliamentary constituency. The opening ceremony was carried out by Harold Wilson, the last living member of Attlee's 1945-51 administration. By the 21st century, the statue had been badly vandalised and was boarded up. In 2010, Tower Hamlets Council offered the statue to Queen Mary University of London on permanent loan. It was re-erected on a site at the Mile End Road campus, next to the People's Palace where Attlee had attended the vote counting in the 1945 general election and learnt of the victory which brought in his peace-time government.

== History ==
Clement Attlee, 1st Earl Attlee, KG, OM, CH, PC, FRS (1883 – 1967), served as Prime Minister of the United Kingdom from 1945 to 1951. His post-war administration saw the establishment of the National Health Service and the expansion of the Welfare state, the nationalization of major industries, the development of an independent nuclear deterrent, recognition of the State of Israel and independence for India. The son of a prosperous solicitor, Attlee practised as a barrister while undertaking voluntary work in the deprived East End of London. During the First World War he attained the rank of major, fighting in the Gallipoli campaign and on the Western Front. Profoundly affected by the poverty he observed in the East End, he began a political career as Mayor of Stepney in 1919, and was elected as Member of Parliament for Limehouse in 1922. In 1935 he was elected leader of the Labour Party and served during World War II as Deputy Prime Minister in Winston Churchill's war-time coalition, before defeating Churchill in the 1945 general election and leading his own administration as Prime Minister from 1945 to 1951.

In the 1980s the Greater London Council (GLC), led by Ken Livingstone, established a public competition to design and create a statue to commemorate Attlee, who had died in 1967. The intention was to site the statue in Mile End Park, to celebrate both Attlee's achievements and his long connections with the East End. (Note: Attlee's reserved personality, and unshowy demeanour, often led to his being underestimated and to his accomplishments being overlooked. Churchill's reputed, although denied, Sally, "A modest man with much to be modest about", encapsulates this view. Attlee's response is summarised in a limerick he wrote; "There were few who thought him a starter, Many who thought themselves smarter. But he ended PM, CH and OM, an Earl and a Knight of the Garter".) The competition was won by Frank Forster. By the time of the statue's completion in 1988, the GLC had been abolished, and the statue was accepted by Tower Hamlets London Borough Council which paid for the costs of erecting the statue outside the Limehouse Public Library. Attlee had represented the Limehouse parliamentary constituency, and its successor, Walthamstow West, from 1922 to 1955. The unveiling ceremony was undertaken by Harold Wilson, former Labour prime minister and the last surviving member of Attlee's post-war cabinet.

The Limehouse Library was closed in 2003 and the Attlee statue became the target of repeated vandalism. Following an incident which saw the loss of one of the statue's hands, it was boarded up for over four years. In 2010 the council and Queen Mary University of London reached an agreement for the university to take the statue on permanent loan and re-locate it to the Mile End campus, with all costs being borne by the university. The new site also had connections to Attlee's career, as it is adjacent to the New People's Palace, where Attlee had attended the vote counting in the 1945 general election and learned of his landslide victory over Churchill which lead to the first majority Labour government. The statue was transferred, restored by Frank Forster, and re-sited and unveiled in 2011. On this occasion, the unveiling was conducted by Peter Mandelson, grandson of Herbert Morrison, Attlee's Deputy Prime Minister and his long-time political rival.

=== Reception ===
The critic Charles Saumarez Smith considers the statue a "convincing example of modern figurative sculpture". Bridget Cherry and Charles O'Brien, in the 2005 revised version London 5: East of the Pevsner Buildings of England series, describe it as "touchingly prosaic". In his detailed study, London’s Immortals: The Complete Outdoor Commemorative Statues, John Blackwood devotes an entire chapter to the commissioning, construction and placement of the Attlee statue, describing it as “finished to perfection, [.] the leader in middle life, human, modest and determined”. (Note: Blackwood’s study was published prior to the moving of the statue from Limehouse to Mile End.)

== Description ==
The statue is executed in bronze and is 2.00 metres (6.56 ft) high. It stands on a 1.55 metres (5.1 ft) high plinth. (Note: The original plinth at Limehouse was also designed by Forster in a mix of brick and stone. The current base is a replacement.) Forster undertook recasting of the statue in 2009, including the replacement of the lost hand. (Note: Frank Forster was also responsible for the sculpture on the Chindit Memorial in Victoria Embankment Gardens.) Attlee is depicted in a suit and wearing spectacles. His left hand holds his suit lapel while in his right hand, he holds a copy of the National Assistance Act 1948. The sculpture is not listed.

== Sources ==
- Blackwood, John (1989). London's Immortals: The Complete Outdoor Commemorative Statues. London: Savoy Press. ISBN 0-9514296-0-4. OCLC 21328602.
- Cherry, Bridget; O'Brien, Charles; Pevsner, Nikolaus (2005). London 5: East. Pevsner Buildings of England. New Haven, US and London: Yale University Press. ISBN 978-0-300-10701-2.
