= Blizard Building =

Building in Whitechapel, London

- The Blizard Building
- Interactive map of the Blizard Building area

General information
- Location: Whitechapel, London, England
- Coordinates: 51.5165°N 0.0613°W
- Named for: William Blizard
- Construction started: November 2003
- Completed: March 2005
- Cost: £45 million

Design and construction
- Architect: Will Alsop
- Main contractor: AMEC

The Blizard Building is a building in Whitechapel in the London Borough of Tower Hamlets. It houses the Blizard Institute, formerly known as the Blizard Institute of Cell and Molecular Science, part of Barts and The London School of Medicine and Dentistry.

The building is named after William Blizard, who founded the London Hospital Medical College in 1785.

== History ==
The Blizard Building under construction

The building was commissioned in Autumn 2000, and designed by the architect Will Alsop. Construction began in November 2003, with AMEC as the main contractor, and was completed in March 2005, at a cost of £45 million. It was officially opened in October 2005 by The Princess Royal.

Construction on a £2 million extension in the form of a Neuron Pod began in April 2018 and was completed in March 2019. This extension, also designed by Alsop, was one of his last works, as he died one month after construction began.

== Design ==
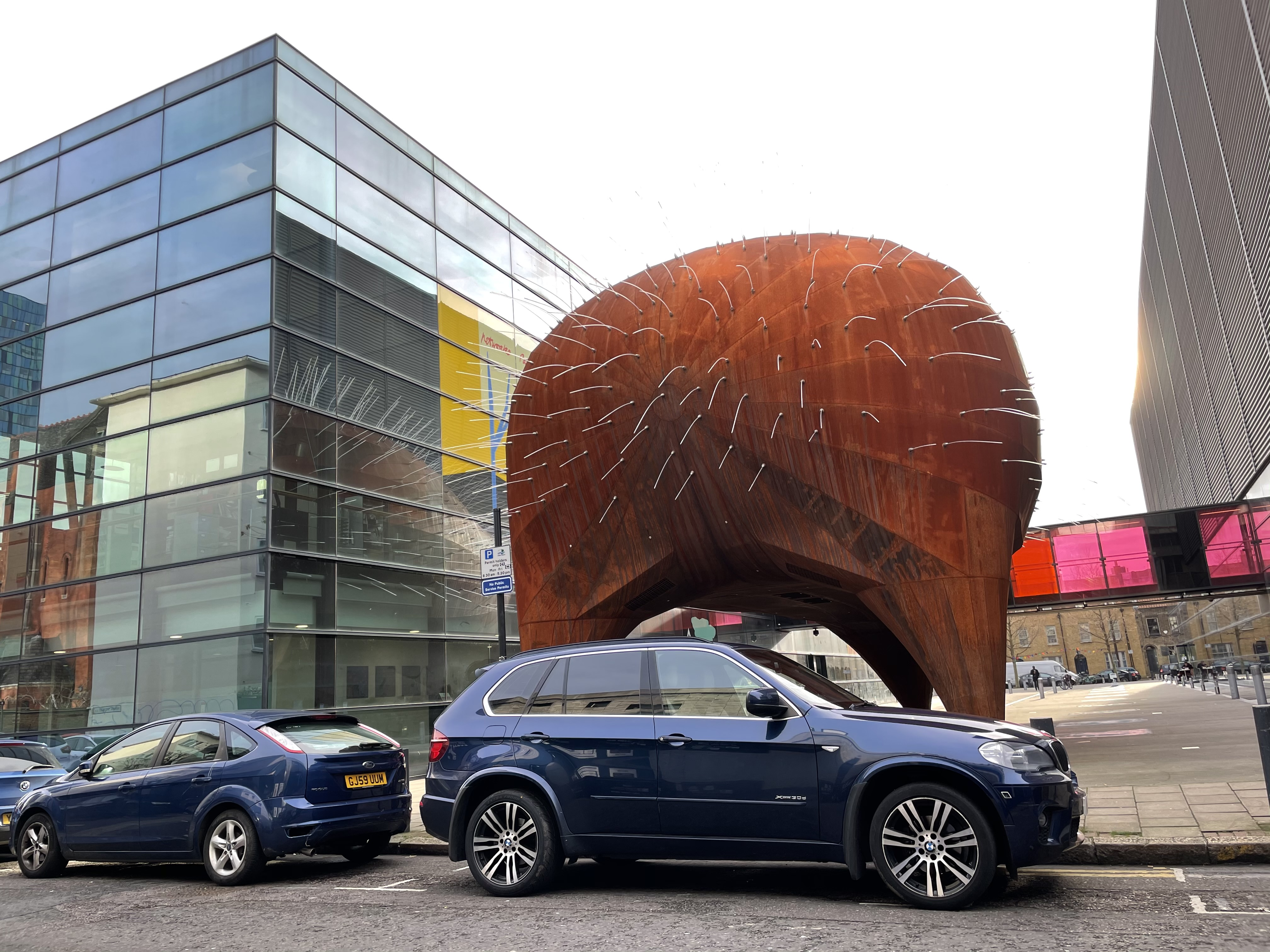
The Neuron Pod

The building consists of two glass-clad and steel-framed pavilions, separated by a central yard, and connected to each other by a multi-coloured glass walkway. The glass cladding of the pavilions includes some coloured panels designed by the artist Bruce McLean, depicting images inspired by molecular science.

The walkway also provides access to the Neuron Pod, a free standing steel structure located at the northern end of the central yard. The pod is modelled on a nerve cell, and covered with hundred of plastic filaments, designed to look like hairs. These filaments are illuminated by optical fibres powered by projectors inside the pod.

The larger, eastern pavilion contains a large, open void, allowing light natural light to reach the open-plan research laboratories located on the lower ground floor. Four, smaller, multipurpose pods of various shapes and sizes are suspended above this void. The smaller, narrower western pavilion houses the electrical and mechanical machinery required to power the building, hidden behind a zinc cladding system.

The building was awarded the 2006 RIBA award and the 2006 Civic Trust Award.

== Facilities ==
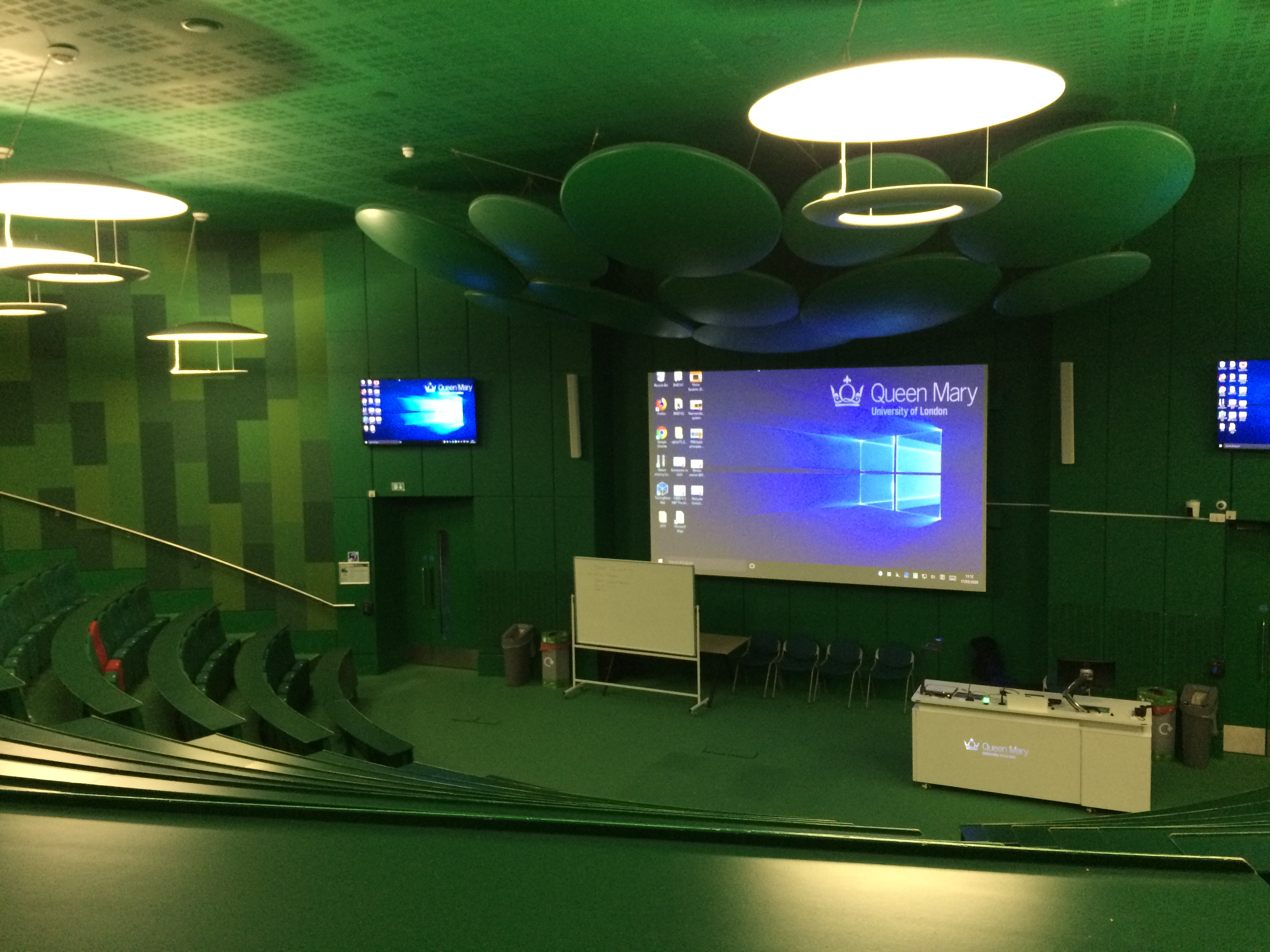
The Perrin Lecture Theatre

The eastern pavilion contains the main research facilities, including the underground laboratories, as well as office spaces and study areas. The western pavilion contains the main entrance, a waiting area, a café, additional research facilities and a 400-seat lecture theatre.

The Neuron Pod located in between the two pavilions is home to the Centre of the Cell, a science education centre specifically aimed at children. The centre was opened by Blue Peter presenter Helen Skelton in September 2009 and was initially located in one of the smaller pods within the main research building, but was relocated upon completion of the Neuron Pod in 2019. It is the first science education centre in the world to be located within biomedical research laboratories, and is aimed at getting children from the local area interested in science and research.

== In popular culture ==
In the third episode of the third series of the BBC crime drama Luther, broadcast in 2013, the Blizard Building was used as the filming location for a scene in which DCI John Luther (Idris Elba) meets Mary Day (Sienna Guillory).
