= Medical College of St Bartholomew's Hospital =

Medical school in London, England (1843–1995)

- Type: Medical school
- Active: 1843–1995
- Parent institution: University of London
- Affiliations: United Hospitals
- Location: Smithfield, London, England

The Medical College of St Bartholomew's Hospital, also known as St Bartholomew's Hospital Medical College, was a medical school based at St Bartholomew's Hospital in Smithfield in the City of London. It was founded in 1843. In 1995 it merged with the London Hospital Medical College to form Barts and The London School of Medicine and Dentistry, part of Queen Mary University of London

== History ==
The first records of medical students at St Bartholomew's Hospital date back to 1662, although it was not until 1791 that the governors of the hospital agreed for a lecture theatre to be built. In 1843 a residental college was built to allow students to reside within the walls of the hospital, and the medical college was inaugurated in the same year. The college was incorporated as the "Medical College of St Bartholomew’s Hospital in the City of London" on 26 July 1921, when the college and the hospital were formally separated.
